= List of law enforcement agencies in Missouri =

This is a list of law enforcement agencies in the state of Missouri.

According to the US Bureau of Justice Statistics' 2008 Census of State and Local Law Enforcement Agencies, the state had 576 law enforcement agencies employing 14,554 sworn police officers, about 244 for each 100,000 residents.

== State agencies ==
- Missouri Department of Conservation
  - Protection Division
- Missouri Department of Corrections
- Missouri Department of Revenue, Criminal Investigation Bureau
- Missouri Department of Natural Resources
  - Missouri State Park Rangers
- Missouri Department of Public Safety
  - Missouri Gaming Commission
  - Missouri Homeland Security
  - Missouri State Capitol Police
  - Missouri State Emergency Management Agency
  - Missouri State Fire Marshal Investigation Unit
  - Missouri State Highway Patrol
    - Missouri State Water Patrol
  - Missouri State Marshal

== County agencies ==
- Adair County Sheriff's Office
- Andrew County Sheriff's Office
- Atchison County Sheriff's Office
- Audrain County Sheriff's Office
- Barry County Sheriff's Office
- Barton County Sheriff's Office
- Bates County Sheriff's Office
- Benton County Sheriff's Office
- Bollinger County Sheriff's Office
- Boone County Sheriff's Office
- Buchanan County Sheriff's Office
- Butler County Sheriff's Office
- Caldwell County Sheriff's Office
- Callaway County Sheriff's Office
- Camden County Sheriff's Office
- Cape Girardeau County Sheriff's Office
- Carroll County Sheriff's Office
- Carter County Sheriff's Office
- Cass County Sheriff's Office
- Cedar County Sheriff's Office
- Chariton County Sheriff's Office
- Christian County Sheriff's Office
- Clark County Sheriff's Office
- Clay County Sheriff's Office
- Clinton County Sheriff's Office
- Cole County Sheriff's Office
- Cooper County Sheriff's Department
- Crawford County Sheriff's Office
- Dade County Sheriff's Office
- Dallas County Sheriff's Office
- Daviess County Sheriff's Office
- Dekalb County Sheriff's Office
- Douglas County Sheriff's Office
- Dunklin County Sheriff's Office
- Franklin County Sheriff's Office
- Gasconade County Sheriff's Office
- Gentry County Sheriff's Office
- Greene County Sheriff's Office
- Grundy County Sheriff's Office
- Harrison County Sheriff's Office
- Henry County Sheriff's Office
- Hickory County Sheriff's Office
- Holt County Sheriff's Office
- Howard County Sheriff's Office
- Howell County Sheriff's Office
- Iron County Sheriff's Office
- Jackson County Department of Corrections
- Jackson County Park Rangers (Missouri)
- Jackson County Sheriff's Office
- Jasper County Sheriff's Office
- Jefferson County Sheriff's Office
- Johnson County Sheriff's Office
- Knox County Sheriff's Office
- Laclede County Sheriff's Office
- Lafayette County Sheriff's Office
- Lawrence County Sheriff's Office
- Lewis County Sheriff's Office
- Lincoln County Sheriff's Office
- Linn County Sheriff's Office
- Livingston County Sheriff's Office
- Macon County Sheriff's Office
- Madison County Sheriff's Office
- Maries County Sheriff's Office
- Marion County Sheriff's Office
- McDonald County Sheriff's Office
- Mercer County Sheriff's Office
- Miller County Sheriff's Office
- Mississippi County Sheriff's Office
- Moniteau County Sheriff's Office
- Monroe County Sheriff's Office
- Montgomery County Sheriff's Office
- Morgan County Sheriff's Office
- New Madrid County Sheriff's Office
- Newton County Sheriff's Office
- Nodaway County Sheriff's Office
- Oregon County Sheriff's Office
- Osage County Sheriff's Office
- Ozark County Sheriff's Office
- Pemiscot County Sheriff's Office
- Perry County Sheriff's Office
- Pettis County Sheriff's Office
- Phelps County Sheriff's Office
- Pike County Sheriff's Office
- Platte County Sheriff's Office
- Polk County Sheriff's Office
- Pulaski County Sheriff's Department
- Putnam County Sheriff's Office
- Ralls County Sheriff's Office
- Randolph County Sheriff's Office
- Ray County Sheriff's Office
- Reynolds County Sheriff's Office
- Ripley County Sheriff's Office
- Saline County Sheriff's Office
- Schuyler County Sheriff's Office
- Scotland County Sheriff's Office
- Scott County Sheriff's Office
- Shannon County Sheriff's Office
- Shelby County Sheriff's Office
- St. Charles County Police Department
- St. Charles County Sheriff's Office
- St. Clair County Sheriff's Office
- St. Francois County Sheriff's Office
- St. Genevieve County Sheriff's Office
- St. Louis County
  - North County Police Cooperative
  - St. Louis County Police Department
- Stoddard County Sheriff's Office
- Stone County Sheriff's Office
- Sullivan County Sheriff's Office
- Taney County Sheriff's Office
- Texas County Sheriff's Office
- Vernon County Sheriff's Office
- Warren County Sheriff's Office
- Washington County Sheriff's Office
- Wayne County Sheriff's Office
- Webster County Sheriff's Office
- Worth County Sheriff's Office
- Wright County Sheriff's Office

== City agencies ==
- Adrian Police Department
- Advance Police Department
- Alba Police Department
- Albany Police Department
- Allendale Police Department
- Anderson Police Department
- Appleton City Police Department
- Arnold Police Department
- Ash Grove Police Department
- Ashland Police Department
- Aurora Police Department
- Ava Police Department
- Ballwin Police Department
- Bates City Police Department
- Bel-Nor Police Department
- Bel-Ridge Police Department
- Bell City Police Department
- Bella Vista Police Department
- Bellefontaine Neighbors Police Department
- Bellflower Police Department
- Belton Police Department
- Berkeley Hills Police Department
- Berkeley Police Department
- Bernie Police Department
- Bethany Police Department
- Beverly Hills Police Department
- Billings Police Department
- Birmingham Police Department
- Bismarck Police Department
- Bland Police Department
- Bloomfield Police Department
- Blue Springs Police Department
- Bolivar Police Department
- Bonne Terre Police Department
- Booneville Police Department
- Bourbon Police Department
- Bowling Green Police Department
- Branson Police Department
- Braymer Police Department
- Breckenridge Hills Police Department
- Brentwood Police Department
- Bridgeton Police Department
- Brookfield Police Department
- Browning Police Department
- Brunswick Police Department
- Buckner Police Department
- Buffalo Police Department
- Butler Police Department
- Byrnes Mill Police Department
- Cabool Police Department
- California Police Department
- Calverton Park Police Department
- Camdenton Police Department
- Cameron Police Department
- Carthage Police Department
- Cassville Police Department
- Charleston Police Department
- Chesterfield Police Department
- Chillicothe Police Department
- Claycomo Police Department
- Clayton Police Department
- Columbia Police Department
- Country Club Hills Police Department
- Crocker Police Department
- De Soto Police Department
- Doniphan Police Department
- Eastborough Police Department
- East Prairie Police Department
- Edmundson Police Department
- Edwardsville Police Department
- Eldon Police Department
- El Dorado Springs Police Department
- Eureka Police Department
- Excelsior Springs Police Department
- Fair Grove Police Department
- Ferguson Police Department
- Flordell Hills Police Department
- Florissant Police Department
- Frontenac Police Department
- Garden City Police Department
- Gladstone Police Department
- Grain Valley Police Department
- Grandview Police Department
- Hannibal Police Department
- Hanley Hills Police Department
- Hawk Point Police Department
- Hazelwood Police Department
- Hillsdale Police Department
- Iberia Police Department
- Independence Police Department
- Jefferson City Police Department
- Jonesburg Police Department
- Joplin Police Department
- Kahoka Police Department
- Kansas City Police Department
- Kirksville Police Department
- Kirkwood Police Department
- Ladue Police Department
- Lakeshire Police Department
- Lake Lotawana Police Department
- Lake Ozark Police Department
- Lake Winnebago Police Department
- Lee's Summit Police Department
- Liberty Police Department
- Licking Police Department
- Linn Creek Police Department
- Lone Jack Police Department
- Manchester Police Department
- Maplewood Police Department
- Marceline Police Department
- Moline Acres Police Department
- Montgomery City Police Department
- Mount Vernon Police Department
- Nevada Police Department
- Nixa Police Department
- Normandy Police Department
- North Kansas City Police Department
- North Woods Police Department
- O'Fallon Police Department
- Oakview Police Department
- Old Monroe Police Department
- Osage Beach Police Department
- Overland Police Department
- Pacific Police Department
- Pagedale Police Department
- Parkville Police Department
- Parma Police Department
- Peculiar Police Department
- Pine Lawn Police Department
- Platte City Police Department
- Platte Woods Police Department
- Pleasant Hill Police Department
- Pleasant Valley Police Department
- Poplar Bluff Police Department
- Raymore Police Department
- Raytown Police Department
- Richland Police Department
- Riverside Police Department
- Rock Hill Police Department
- Rolla Police Department
- Saint Ann Police Department
- Saint Joseph Police Department
- Smithville Police Department
- St. Charles City Police Department
- St. Louis City Sheriff's Office
- St. Louis Metropolitan Police Department
- St. Louis Airport Police Department
- St. Robert Police Department
- Sedalia Police Department
- Sikeston Police Department
- Sparta Police Department
- Springfield Police Department
- Sunrise Beach Police Department
- Sunset Hills Police Department
- Town and Country Police Department
- Troy Police Department
- Truesdale Police Department
- Velda City Police Department
- Warrensburg Police Department
- Warrenton Police Department
- Warson Woods Police Department
- Washington Police Department
- Waynesville Police Department
- Webb City Police Department
- Webster Groves Police Department
- Wentzville Police Department
- Weston Police Department
- Wright City Police Department

== Disbanded agencies ==
- Charlack Police Department
- City of Dellwood Police Department
- Holt Police Department
- Jennings Police Department
- Mosby Police Department
- Odessa Police Department
- Randolph Police Department
- Uplands Park Police Department
- Vinita Park Police Department
- Wellston Police Department
- New Haven Police Department (temporarily)
