= Thiruvananthapuram International Airport =

Airport in Kerala, India

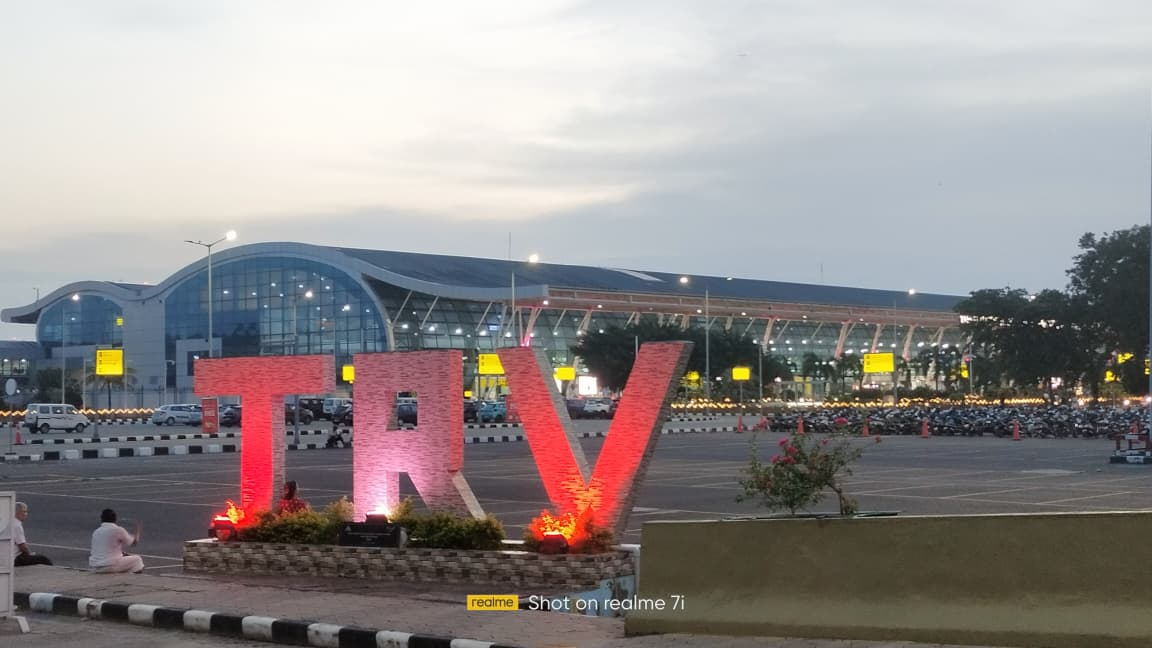
- IATA: TRV; ICAO: VOTV

Summary
- Airport type: Public
- Owner: Airports Authority of India
- Operator: TRV (Kerala) International Airport Limited
- Serves: Thiruvananthapuram
- Location: Thiruvananthapuram,Kerala, India
- Opened: 1932; 94 years ago
- Operating base for: Air India Express; Air India
- Elevation AMSL: 17 ft (5.2 m)
- Coordinates: 8.48°N 76.92°E
- Website: www.adani.com/thiruvananthapuram-airport

Map
- Location of airport in Kerala TRV (India)

Runways
| Direction | Length | | Surface |
| Direction | m | ft | Surface |
|---|---|---|---|
| 14/32 | 3,374 | 11,070 | Asphalt |

Statistics (April 2025 - March 2026)
- Passengers: 4,694,206 (▼4.0%)
- Aircraft movements: 30,018 (▼5.6%)
- Cargo tonnage: 20,774 (▼9.8%)
- Source: AAI

Thiruvananthapuram International Airport (IATA: TRV, ICAO: VOTV) is an international airport that serves Thiruvananthapuram, the capital city of Kerala, India. Established in 1932, it is the first airport in the state of Kerala and the fifth international airport of India, officially declared in 1991. The airport, spread over an area of 800 acres (320 ha), the airport is approximately 3.7 km (2.3 mi) due west from the city centre and the Padmanabhaswamy Temple, 16 km (9.9 mi) from Kovalam beach, 13 km (8.1 mi) from Technopark and 21 km (13 mi) from Vizhinjam International Seaport. It shares a visible proximity to Shankumugham Beach making it the nearest airport to a water body in India as it is just about 0.6 miles (approx. 1 km) away from the Arabian Sea.

The airport is the second-busiest airport in the state of Kerala and the 16th overall in India, as of 2026. In the financial year 2024-25, the airport handled over 4.8 million passengers, with a total of around 31,800 aircraft movements. In addition to civil operations, the airport headquarters the Southern Air Command (India) of the Indian Air Force (IAF) and the Indian Coast Guard for their operations. IAF has an exclusive apron to handle all their operations. Thiruvananthapuram Airport also caters to the Rajiv Gandhi Academy for Aviation Technology, which carries out pilot training activities. The airport hosts Air India's narrow body maintenance, repair and overhaul (MRO) unit consisting of twin hangars for servicing Boeing 737-type aircraft, servicing mostly Air India Express aircraft.

== History ==
The airport was established in 1932 as part of the Royal Flying Club under the initiative of Lt. Col. Raja Goda Varma, husband of Karthika Thirunal Lakshmi Bayi, the Rani of Attingal and Travancore Kingdom. Raja Goda Varman, a trained pilot, felt the need for an airport to accommodate Travancore in the aviation map of India and requested the Travancore Durbar to initiate the process of establishing an aerodrome. A detailed report was made and presented to the King by Consort Prince in this regard. It may be mentioned that the King was the brother of Lt. Col. Raja's wife, and the colonel's children were the heirs to the throne.

Commercial aviation arrived shortly thereafter. In 1935, on the royal patronage of Maharaja Chithira Thirunal, Tata Airlines made its maiden flight to the airport using an DH.83 Fox Moth aircraft under command of pilot Nevill Vintcent carrying Jamshed Navoroji, a Tata company official, and Kanchi Dwarakadas, commercial agent of Travancore in Karachi, with a special mail from the Viceroy of British India, Lord Willingdon, wishing birthday greetings to the Maharaja.

The first flight took off on 1 November 1935, carrying mails of Royal Anchal (Travancore Post) to Bombay. In 1938, the Royal Government of Travancore acquired a Dakota as the Maharaja's private aircraft and placed the first squadron of the Royal Indian Air Force (Travancore) for protection of the state from aerial attacks. After Independence, the airstrip was used for domestic flights with the construction of a new domestic terminal, Terminal 1.

During the 1970s and 1980s, traffic grew significantly due to increasing migration from Kerala to the Gulf countries. International operations were initiated by Air India to cities in the Arabian Peninsula in the late 1970s using Boeing 707. By the early 80s, the then-Indian Airlines started service to Colombo, followed by service to Male. Later, Gulf Air, SriLankan Airlines (then Air Lanka) and Air Maldives (now Maldivian) started operations. These were followed by Indian Airlines, which started a service to Sharjah. On 1 January 1991, TIA was upgraded to an international airport, making it the fifth international airport of India after Delhi, Bombay, Madras and Calcutta.

On 1 March 2011, the first flight operated from the new international terminal, Terminal 2. IX 536 (Air India Express) from Sharjah marked the first arrival. Air India Express operated the first departure to Dubai from this new terminal. IndianOil Skytanking is the company that introduced single-man refuelling in India and started refuelling operations at Trivandrum in March 2016.

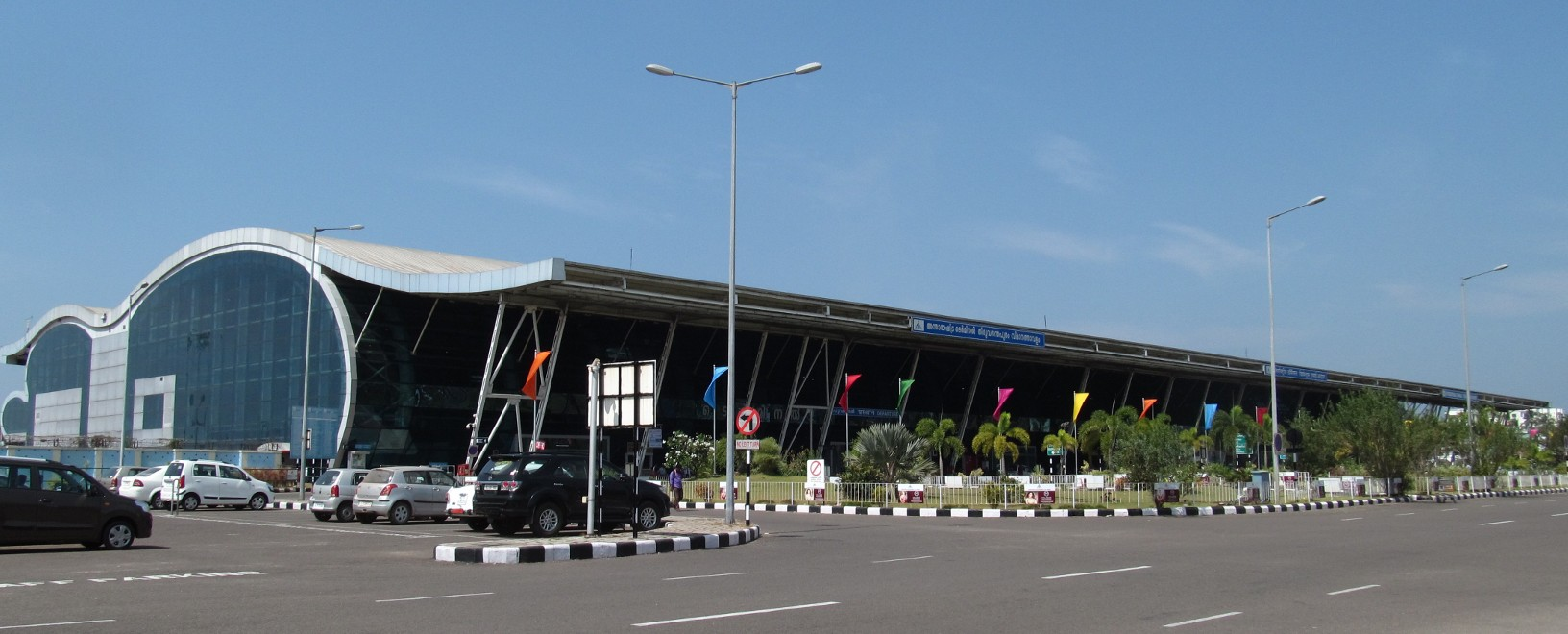
Thiruvananthapuram International Terminal.

In November 2018, the Central Government cleared a proposal by the Airports Authority of India (AAI) for leasing out six of its airports, including Thiruvananthapuram. The following month, AAI commenced an international competitive bidding process to award Operations, Management and Development (OMD) contracts for the six airports. The Adani Group, GMR Group and Kerala State Industrial Development Corporation (KSIDC) participated in the bidding process that was won by the Adani Group.

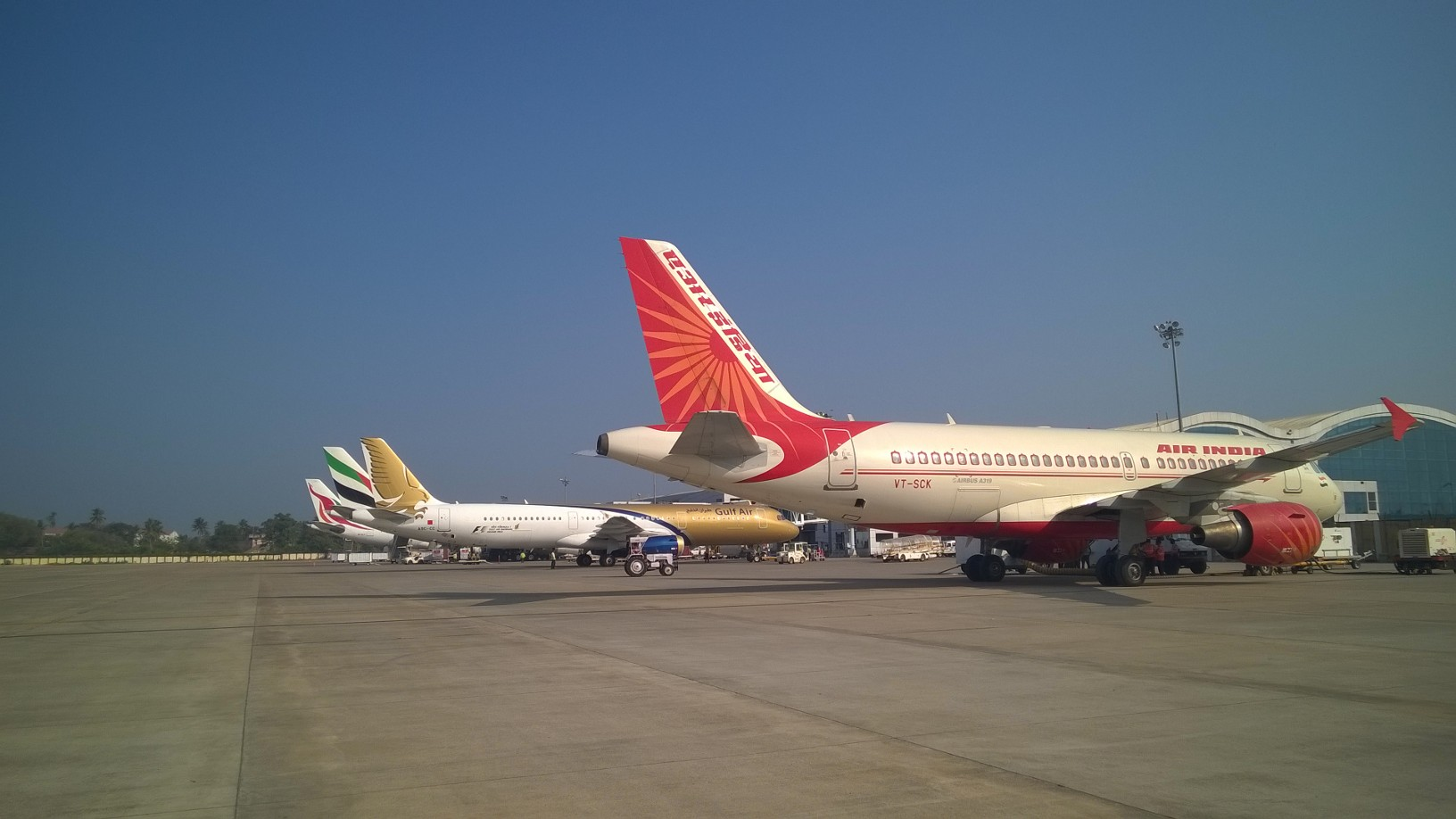
Image of Air India , Emirates , Gulf Air , Sri Lankan & Air India Express In Thiruvananthapuram International Airport

Since some public interest litigations were filed concerning the bidding process for the airport, the Union Cabinet gave its approval for awarding the airport to Adani subject to the outcome of Writ Petition. Accordingly, AAI signed a letter of agreement with Adani in September 2020. Adani Thiruvananthapuram International Airport Limited (ATIAL), floated by the Adani Group to run the airport, would operate, manage and develop the airport for fifty years. As per the agreement, ATIAL would get control of the airport only after a concession agreement was executed and the performance bank guarantee was paid and subject to clearance of legal hurdles.

== Aippasi and Panguni festival processions ==
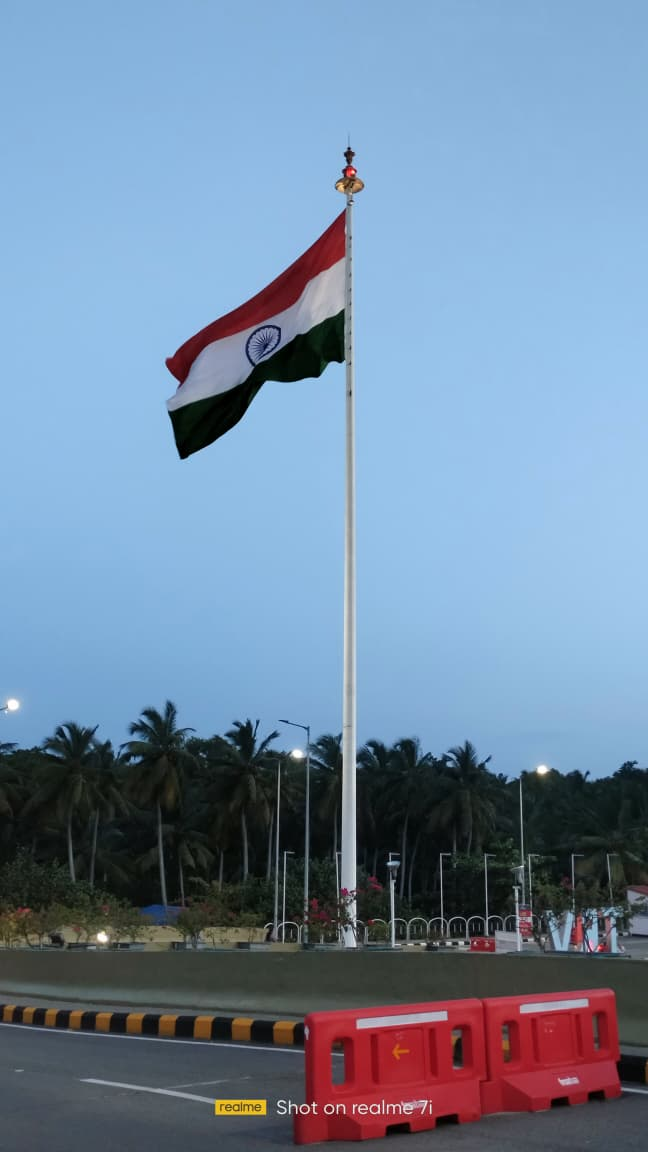
Thiruvananthapuram International Airport Flagpole

For decades, the airport has been traditionally pausing operations and reschedules flights twice a year to enable religious processions to pass through the airfield. The airport issues a NOTAM (Notice to Airmen) twice yearly before the runway is closed for the bi-annual Aippasi festival, which falls in Thulam, October–November, and for the Panguni festival in Meenam, which is held during March–April. The processions used to pass through the same route even before the airport was established in 1932. The temple issues special passes to participants in the 'aarattu' to pass through the airfield's operational areas. The procession is escorted by priests, members of the erstwhile Travancore Royal family, caparisoned elephants, police band and armed and mounted police personnel besides large number of devotees and is a grand spectacle for onlookers.

== Facilities ==
=== Runway ===
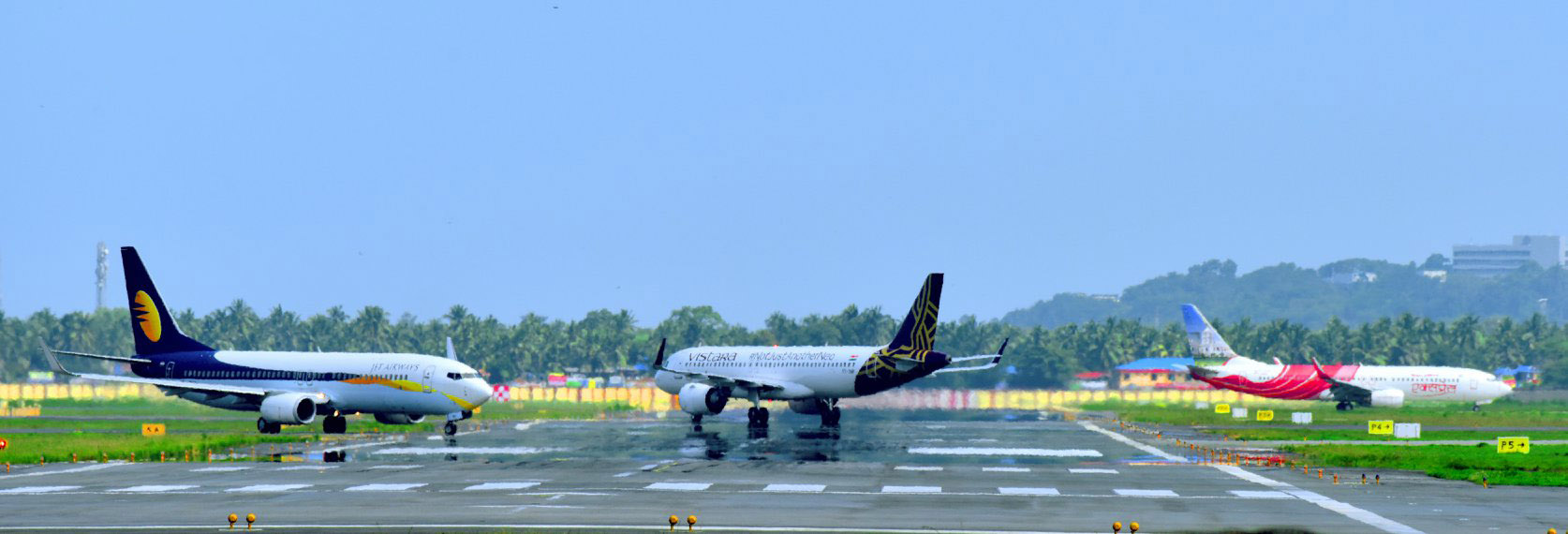
(From Left) Jet Airways, Vistara and Air India Express flights near the runway getting ready for Takeoff

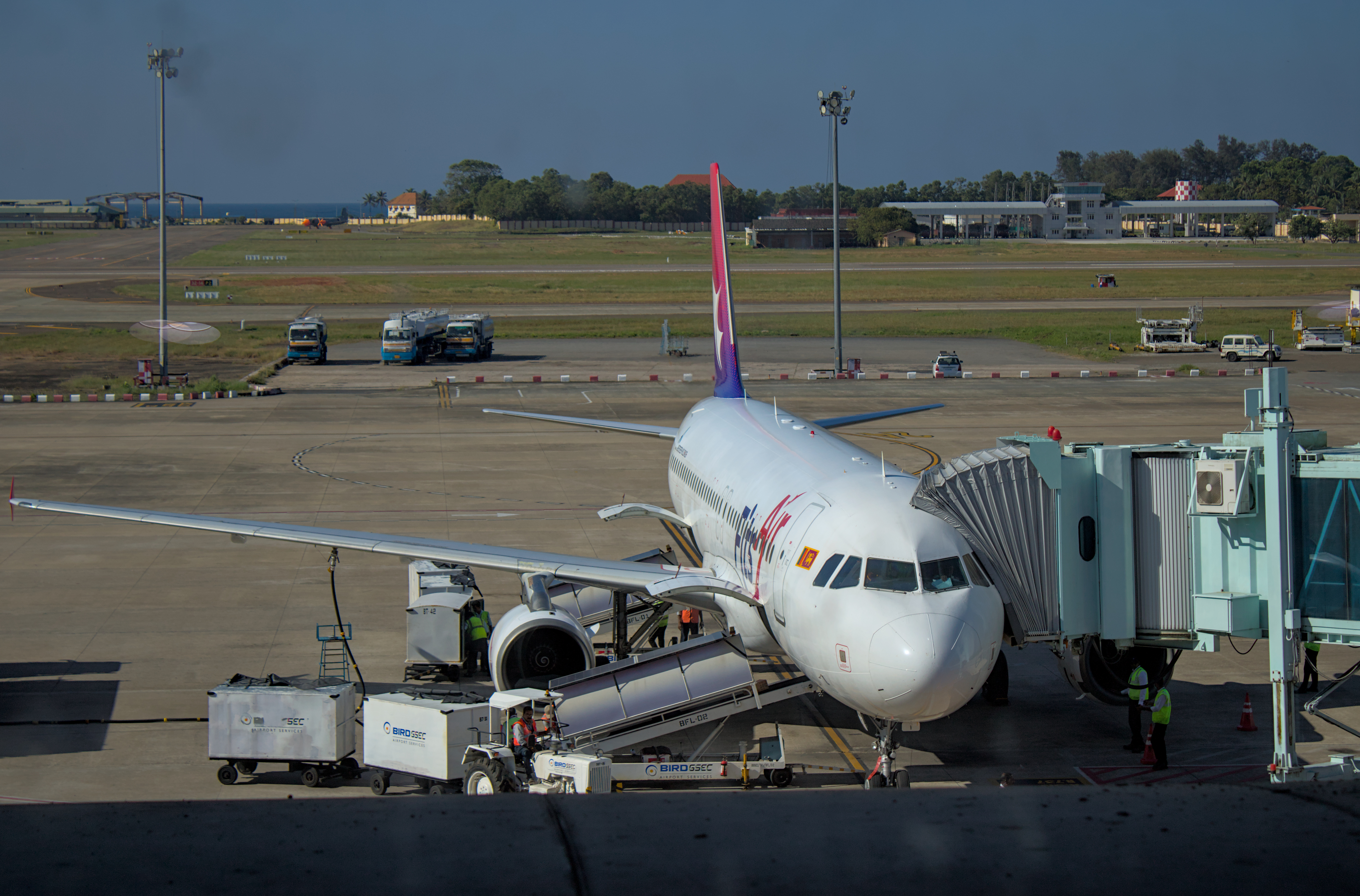
A FitsAir Airbus A320-232 registered 4R-EXR, at VOTV airport's international terminal

Thiruvananthapuram International Airport has a single 3,373 m (11,066 ft)-long runway, equipped to operate any type of aircraft. It has a 1,880 m (6,170 ft)-long parallel taxiway.

=== Terminal ===
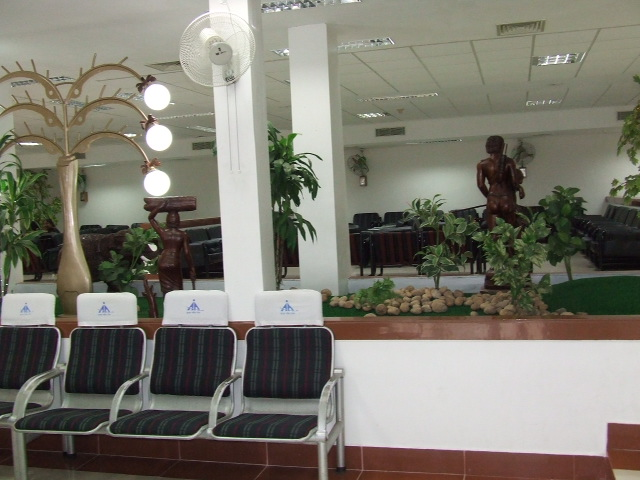
The domestic terminal (Terminal 1)

There are two terminals. Terminal 1 is for domestic flights, and Terminal 2 is for all international flights.

The international terminal ground operations are handled by Air India SATS Airport Services Pvt. Ltd and BIRD GSEC Pvt. Ltd. It has three baggage carousels and elaborate immigration/customs facilities. Flemingo, India's first privately owned duty-free operator, is managing the duty-free shop at the international terminal.

The domestic terminal has basic amenities including cafés, a beer and wine bar, a book-seller, free local calls, a specialised baby care room and phone-recharging points. Into Plane Services fuelling operations handled by IndianOil Skytanking.

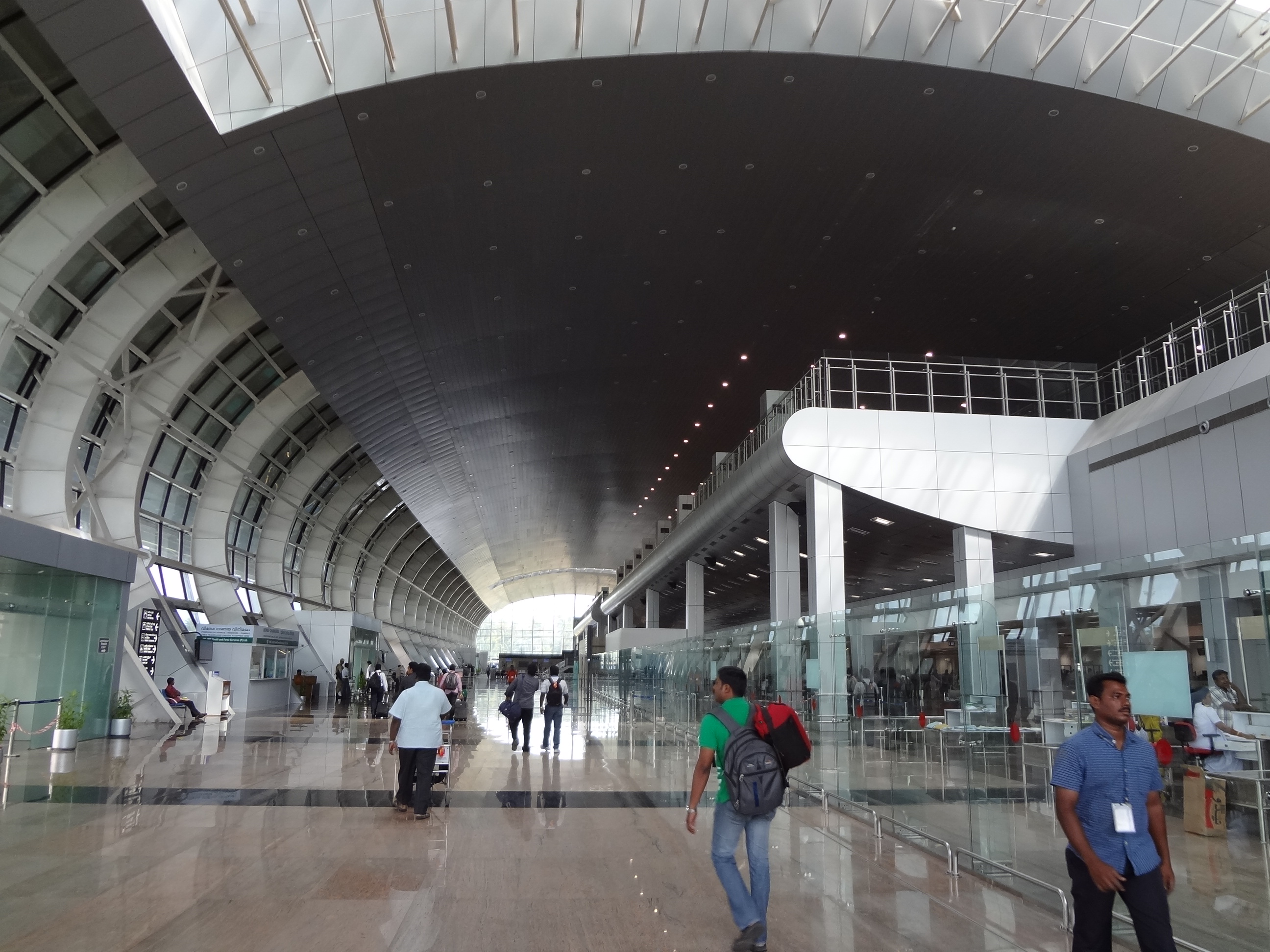
The international terminal (Terminal 2)

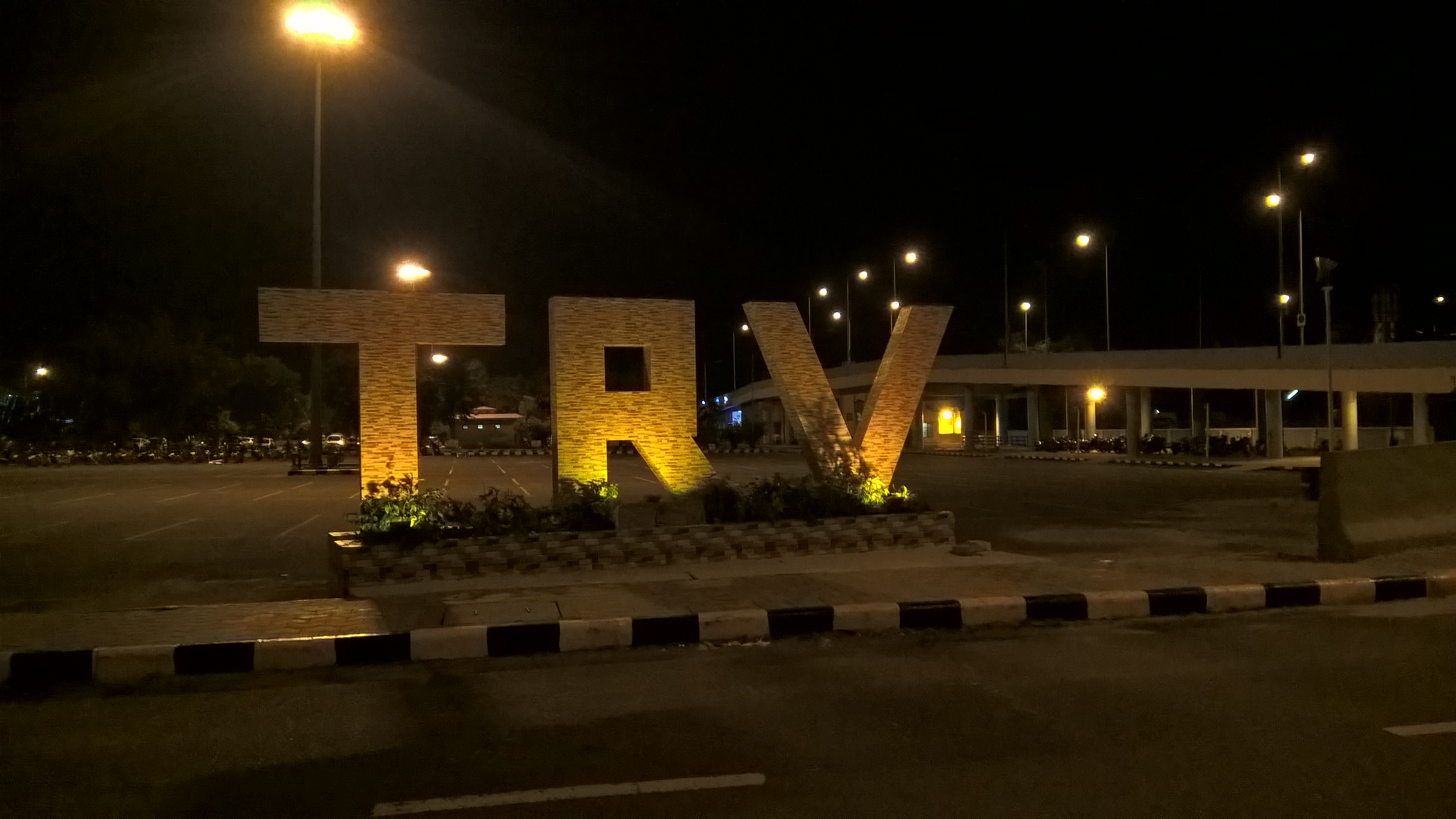
IATA code sign outside Terminal 2

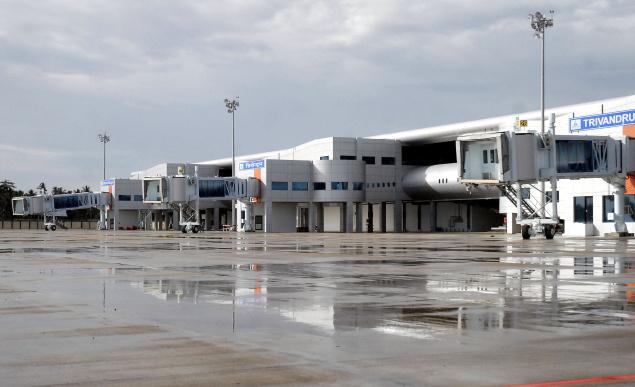
Terminal 2 Operational Area

=== Terminal 1 (Domestic) ===
The domestic terminal was the first terminal of the airport inaugurated by Chief minister of Kerala EK Nayanar in 1992. It has an area of 9,200 m^{2} (99,000 sq ft) and can handle 400 passengers at a time. The terminal has two Aerobridges and two remote gates. All domestic flights are operated from here. This terminal is also called as DTB (Domestic Terminal Building).

=== Terminal 2 (International) ===
This terminal is called as NITB (New International Terminal Building). Terminal 2 has four aerobridges and three additional jetways and parking bays to accommodate 8 aircraft. The terminal is built opposite to the domestic terminal across the runway and is closer to the city side. The terminal was constructed by the AAI and designed by the UK firm, Pascall+Watson Architects.

The international terminal covers an area of 35,000 m^{2} (380,000 sq ft). It can handle the passengers of three Airbus A340s and one Boeing 747 aircraft simultaneously (roughly 1500 passengers). The annual handling capacity of the terminal is 1.8 million.

The check-in area has a floor area of 950 m^{2} (10,200 sq ft) and an arrival area of 600 m^{2} (6,500 sq ft). To enable the passengers to check in at any counter, a Common Users Terminal Equipment (CUTE) is installed. X-ray machines are attached to the side of the conveyor belts for faster clearance of baggage.

The entrance to the terminal is from Chacka-Eenchakkal Road. A bridge was built across the Parvathy Puthanar canal to link the international terminal to the Thiruvananthapuram bypass on National Highway 66. The international terminal has a car park area that can accommodate about 600 cars.

Thiruvananthapuram Airport was included in the Ministry of civil aviation strategic plan for 2010–2015 to upgrade as a Category-A airport by developing to aerodrome CODE 4E/4F, constructing a parallel runway with taxiways alongside both runways and so forth.

As of September 2025, FTI-TTP has commenced at Thiruvananthapuram International Airport.

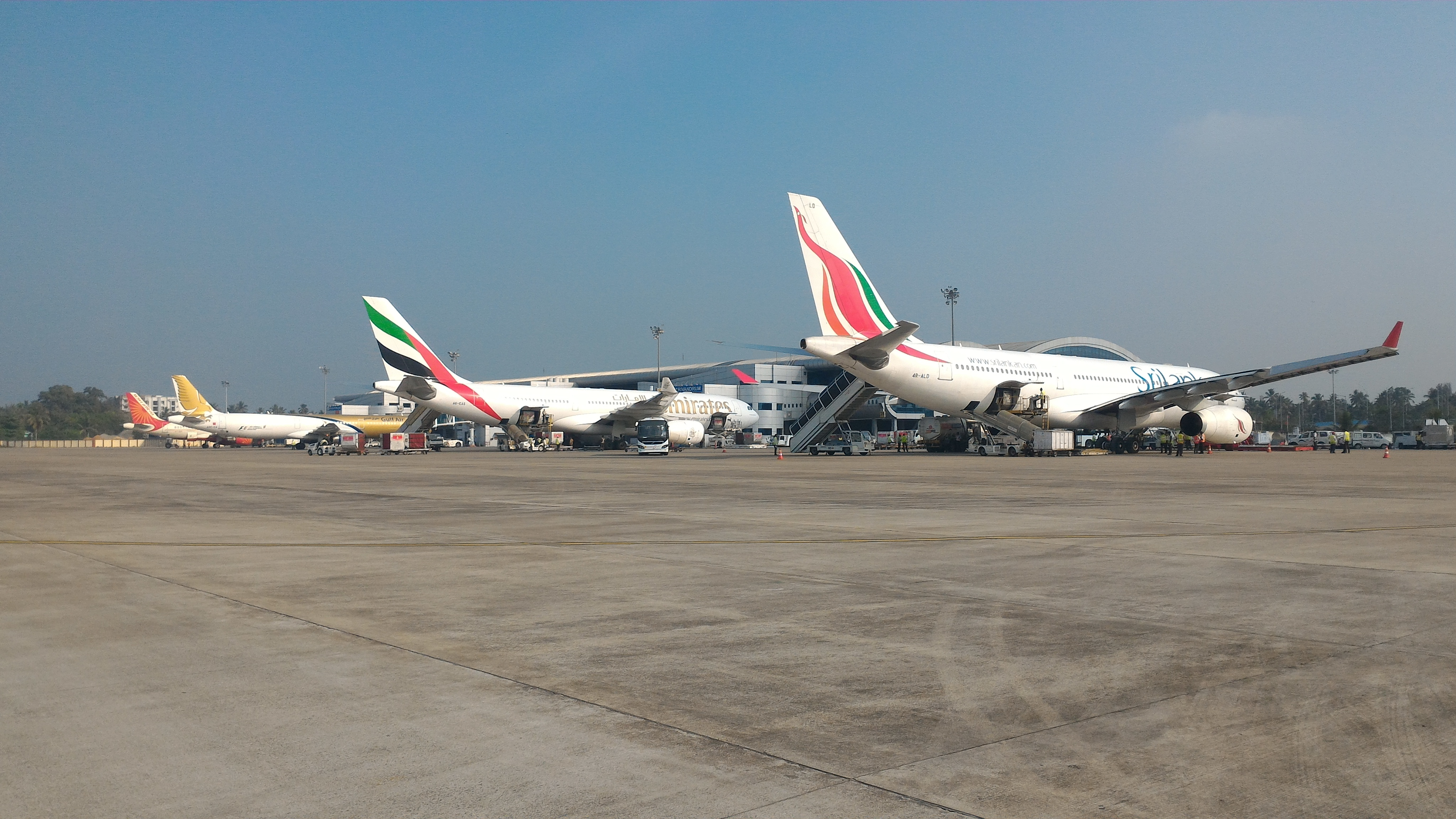
(From Right) SriLankan Airlines, Emirates, Gulf Air and Air India flights parked at the Thiruvananthapuram International Airport

=== Air traffic control ===
The air traffic control (ATC) tower is 18 m (59 ft) tall. There are plans to build a new 50 m (160 ft) tall ATC tower for Thiruvananthapuram Airport near the new international terminal. The airport has a CAT-1 instrument landing system (ILS), DVOR and distance measuring equipment (DME). The airport is also equipped with a Mono-pulse Secondary Surveillance Radar, Air Route Surveillance Radar and an Airport Surveillance Radar that allows approach and area control of the airspace around the airport and nearby air routes.

=== MRO facility ===
Thiruvananthapuram International Airport hosts Air India's narrow-body maintenance, repair and overhaul (MRO) unit consisting of twin hangars for servicing Boeing 737 type aircraft, servicing mostly Air India Express aircraft. The Maintenance Repair Overhaul is set up on 6.07 hectares (15.0 acres) of land at a cost of ₹110 crore (US$23.57 million). It was commissioned on 16 December 2011. The maintenance of two aircraft can be simultaneously done at the two hangars present at the MRO. The facility is state-of-the-art with 5,000 ft^{2} (460 m^{2}) of workshop, 10,000 ft^{2} (930 m^{2}) apron, electrically operated and vertically moving hangar door system, warehouse and office space. The Maintenance, Repair, and Overhaul (MRO) facility of Air India Charters Limited (AICL) at Thiruvananthapuram International Airport was given permission to carry out the crucial 'C' checks of their Boeing 737-800 fleet.

As of 2025, the MRO underwent upgrades to allow base and line maintenance, structural repairs, component overhauls among other capabilities. In addition to the two hangars, the facility also hosts component bays, workshops, a dedicated apron and warehouse facilities. In addition to B737, its certification from DGCA (India), FAA, EASA and AS9110C also authorises maintenance of various variants of Airbus A320 family.

On 4 July 2025, it was reported that the airport's existing MRO facility received the European Union Aviation Safety Agency's (EASA) Part-145 certification, which is the highest recognitions in global aviation safety and compliance. This was following the Royal Air Force's F-35B repair in the facility from 6 to 22 July 2025. Additionally, Air India plans to establish a new MRO facility beside the existing hangars. This facility will be a dual-unit hangar with a capacity of either a wide-body aircraft or two narrow-body aircraft. While the land for the MRO complex has been earmarked, the internal and board approval for the project is pending following which operations are expected to begin within 24 months.

=== Other operations ===
In addition to civil operations, Thiruvananthapuram Airport also caters to IAF and Coast Guard for their strategical operations and Airforce NCC Cadets' training. IAF has an exclusive apron to handle all their operations. Thiruvananthapuram Airport also caters for Rajiv Gandhi Academy for Aviation Technology. The academy has its own hangar facility at the airport. The hangar facility can accommodate 10 trainer aircraft.

== Expansion ==
In November 2023, the AAI announced that the new terminal building will be built at an area covering 44,000 sq.m., an increase from the original plan of 2018, and that out of 18 acres, 16 acres will be acquired for extending the runway to accommodate larger aircraft and handle more flights by September 2024.

The expansion process will also involve the relocation of BrahMos Aerospace Trivandrum Limited (BATL) — a wholly owned subsidiary of BrahMos Aerospace — to a 186 acres (0.75 km^{2}) land in Nettukaltheri, near Neyyar Dam. The facility is currently engaged in producing the BrahMos supersonic cruise missiles for the Indian Armed Forces.

== Airlines and destinations ==
| Airlines | Destinations |
|---|---|
| Air Arabia | Abu Dhabi, Sharjah |
| Air India | Delhi, Mumbai |
| Air India Express | Abu Dhabi, Bahrain, Bengaluru, Chennai, Dammam, Doha, Dubai–International, Hyderabad, Kannur, Kochi, Mangaluru, Muscat, Riyadh, Sharjah, Tiruchirapalli |
| AirAsia | Kuala Lumpur–International |
| Emirates | Dubai–International |
| Etihad Airways | Abu Dhabi |
| Gulf Air | Bahrain |
| IndiGo | Bengaluru, Chennai, Delhi, Hyderabad, Kochi, Kannur, Malé, Mumbai, Mumbai-Navi, Pune, Sharjah |
| Jazeera Airways | Kuwait City |
| Kuwait Airways | Kuwait City |
| Malaysia Airlines | Kuala Lumpur–International |
| Maldivian | Hanimaadhoo, Malé |
| Oman Air | Muscat |
| Qatar Airways | Doha |
| Scoot | Singapore |
| SriLankan Airlines | Colombo–Bandaranaike |

== Statistics ==
From FY 2020 to FY 2025, Trivandrum International Airport (TRV) saw major fluctuations in traffic due to the COVID-19 pandemic in India, with passenger numbers dropping from 3.92 million in 2019–20 to just 0.94 million in 2020–21. Recovery began steadily, reaching 1.66 million in 2021–22, 3.46 million in 2022–23, and 4.44 million in 2023–24. By 2024–25, the airport hit a record 4.89 million passengers and 36,504 aircraft movements, surpassing pre-pandemic levels. Domestic and international travel were nearly balanced, with 2.25 million and 2.88 million passengers respectively. A new high of 16,578 passengers and 101 movements was recorded on 22 December 2024. The airport averaged 14,614 passengers/day and 86 flights/day in FY 2024–25

== Security ==
Thiruvananthapuram International Airport is listed among the major airports of India. Its safety and security are handled by the Bureau of Civil Aviation Security through the Central Industrial Security Force (CISF). In the past, airport security was under the control of airport police (under the state government). However, following the hijacking of Indian Airlines Flight 814 in 1999, airport security was handed over to CISF. Thiruvananthapuram Airport also has advanced security equipment including X-RAY Baggage inspection (X-BIS), Explosive Trace Detection System (ETDS) and provision of an In-Line Baggage Screening system; at the NITB, state-of-the-art Closed Circuit Television (CCTV), Flight Information Display System (fids) and Public Address (PA) systems, as well as an Interactive Voice Response System (IVRS) for flight information, are there for passengers' convenience.

The In-Line Baggage Screening system (ILBS) was installed at Terminal 2 on 21 July 2020.

== Accidents and incidents ==
- On 15 July 1990, an Indian Air Force An-32 crashed in the Ponmudi Mountain Range while en route from Tambaram Air Force Station to Thiruvananthapuram in India.
- On 14 June 2025, a Royal Air Force F-35B (tail number ZM168, aircraft number BK-034) operating from Royal Navy's HMS Prince of Wales (R09) during Operation Highmast made an emergency landing at the Thiruvananthapuram Airport at 9:28 pm IST. After several unsuccessful attempts to land on the carrier the aircraft was running low on fuel, prompting the pilot to request permission to divert to the designated emergency recovery airfield. In response, a full-scale emergency was declared at the airport. The jet made a safe landing and was subsequently taxied to and parked in an isolated bay. The Indian Air Force confirmed the incident, stating that the aircraft was operating outside India's Air Defence Identification Zone (ADIZ) and was detected and identified by the Integrated Air Command and Control System (IACCS) before being granted clearance to land. Within 48 hours of landing, the aircraft was refuelled, though it failed to return to the carrier due to a hydraulic system and Auxiliary Power Unit (APU) failure. On 18 June, a "technical team" of three technicians from the UK CSG arrived in the airport to examine the aircraft before its flight back to the carrier. Meanwhile, armed guards from the CISF were deployed for the aircraft's security. By 20 June, the team had failed to rectify the problem and had returned. On 6 July, at 12:46 pm IST, a larger maintenance team with their equipment arrived onboard an Airbus A400M Atlas. Subsequently, the jet was transferred to a hangar. On 22 July, the F-35B departed from the airport towards Darwin, Australia following necessary repairs. On 23 July, following an approximate 6,400 km (4,000 mi) flight from India, the repaired F-35B rejoined HMS Prince of Wales as she arrived in Australian waters after 37 days. The aircraft was also supported by an RAF Voyager (ZZ335), which provided in-flight refuelling and accompanied the jet for most of the flight, until the jet landed on the carrier just before docking it in Darwin.

== See also ==
- Airports in India
- List of busiest airports in India by passenger traffic
- Cochin International Airport
- Kozhikode International Airport
- Kannur International Airport
- Sabarimala Greenfield Airport
