= Stottlemyre =

- Language: German

Origin
- Meaning: "manager of a wholesale warehouse"
- Region of origin: Germany

Stottlemyre is an Americanized form of the German name Stadelmayer (also Stadelmaier, Stadelmeyer, and Stadelmeier), a name that originated as an occupational title. In medieval Germany, a Stadelmayer or Stadelmeyer was a man who managed the warehouse of a wholesale merchant.

== Description ==
Stottlemyre has several variant spellings, including (most commonly) "Stottlemyer" and "Stottlemeyer." Another recent variant, which stems from the American pronunciation is "Stoudemire."

== Notable Stottlemyres ==
=== Business ===
- L. Brent Stottlemyre, Vice President, Peabody Energy.

=== Politics ===
- Richard Stottlemyer, former mayor (1992–2010) of Penbrook, Pennsylvania
- Roger Stottlemyre, Executive Director of Enforcement, Missouri Gaming Commission
- Todd A. Stottlemyre, fifth president of the National Federation of Independent Business

=== Sports ===
- Mel Stottlemyre, American baseball player
- Mel Stottlemyre Jr., American baseball player
- Todd Stottlemyre, American baseball player
- Rande Stottlemyer, University of Pittsburgh Panthers wrestling head coach

=== Fictional Characters ===
- Captain Leland Stottlemeyer, fictional police officer played by Ted Levine from the USA Network television series Monk
- Karen Stottlemeyer, fictional environmentalist ex-wife of Leland Stottlemeyer
