= Blue Springs Police Department =

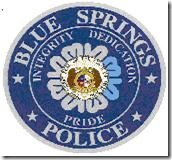
- Patch of the BSPD
- Common name: Blue Springs Police Department
- Abbreviation: BSPD

Agency overview
- Formed: December 1966
- Employees: 142
- Volunteers: 38
- Annual budget: 9,269,185

Jurisdictional structure
- Operations jurisdiction: Blue Springs, Missouri, USA
- Area: 22.35 square miles (57.9 km^{2})
- Population: 58,604 (2020)
- General nature: Local civilian police

Operational structure
- Headquarters: 1100 SW Smith St. Blue Springs, MO 64015
- Sworn officers: 102
- Civilian employees: 40
- Agency executive: Robert Muenz, Chief of Police
- Units: Crime Prevention, Bike Patrol Unit, D.A.R.E., K-9, School Resource Officers, Special Tactical Assistance Team (STAT), Crimes Against Person's Investigations, Traffic Safety, Uniformed Patrol, Drone, Property Crime Investigations, Hostage Negotiation Team, and Fire Investigations.

Facilities
- Buildings: 3
- Police Dogs: 2

Website
- BSPD Official Site

The Blue Springs Police Department (BSPD) is the principal law enforcement agency in Blue Springs, Missouri, and serves a city with a population of 58,604 according to the 2020 United States Census. The department's jurisdiction is the incorporated city limits of the City of Blue Springs, Missouri, and it is located in Jackson County east of Kansas City. The Blue Springs Police Department has 102 sworn law enforcement officers.

== History ==
The Blue Springs Missouri Police Department was formed by the City of Blue Springs, Missouri in December 1966 and started with just three full time employee's serving under 5,000 residents. Prior to the formation of the police department the City of Blue Springs had an elected City Marshall. The elected City Marshall had deputy city Marshall's who worked for him. Until 1966 the City Marshall worked out of a small block building that was under the old water tower at 11th and Smith Street's. The small white block building held all city functions at this time, from City Clerk, to the water department etc. There was also a one-room, small building, known as the "city jail", which was built in 1923 or 1924. The old "city jail" was located near today's 12th and Smith Streets, between 12th Street and the railroad tracks behind the old lumber yard. It is unclear if the "city jail" was ever really used as a jail, but was for sure never used as a jail past the 1950s and was razed in the mid-1980s.

Howard L. Brown - deceased was elected as City Marshall of Blue Springs in 1965 and was appointed as the first Chief of Police in December 1966. Brown started his law enforcement career in 1955 as a member of the Missouri State Highway Patrol, and served as the Chief of Police from December 1966 to November 2001 when he retired after serving the community for 35 years.

From the formation of the BSPD in 1966 to 1968, the police department was located in the Old Blue Springs City Hall, which was a metal building located in the 200 block of NW 11th Street. From 1968 to 1988 BSPD was located on the lower level of the Blue Springs Municipal Building, known today as the Blue Springs City Hall, located at 903 W. Main Street. BSPD out grew its space on the lower level of City Hall by the 1980s and in 1988 BSPD moved to a brand new facility, the Howard L. Brown Public Safety Building, located at 1100 SW Smith Street.

BSPD was the first agency in the State of Missouri to have a 911 emergency communications center serving as a pilot program in 1975. BSPD formed the Community Youth Outreach Unit, "CYOU" in the mid-1990s. The unit, in which officers were in regular, friendly contact with teenagers, was regarded as successful at keeping youth crime in check.

BSPD once required all police officers to be licensed EMTs. Police officers would often drive the ambulance as an EMT to or from an EMS call. The City of Blue Springs had Paramedics on duty but they were assisted by the on duty Police Officer's/EMT's. This practice stopped in 1992 when the City of Blue Springs turned over the operation of the ambulance service to the Central Jackson County Fire Protection District.

In April 2011, voters passed the 1/2 cent dedicated Public Safety Sales Tax to address needs found in the Public Safety Citizen's Advisory Board analysis. Revenues produced from the public safety sales tax will only be used for public safety purposes. The tax cannot be used for other General Fund programs or services. As part of the P.S.S.T. tax a renovation and massive expansion of Blue Springs Police Department building was completed in late 2015. The renovation and expansion doubled the size of the old building. Today BSPD has 102 sworn officers and 40 civilian support staff, totalling 142 employees.

=== Past city marshals ===
- (City platted at present site 1879)
- 1880 - John K Parr / Dep Marshal TJ Walker
- September 1, 1923 until November 5, 1923 - Alonzo Hertig, City Marshal Appointed, who was killed in the line of duty.
- Early 1950s – Earl Nance, City Marshal Elected
- Early to mid-1950s – Eddie Trundle, City Marshal Elected
- Mid 1950s to 1965 – Pete Hearn, City Marshal Elected
- 1965 to December 1966 – Howard L. Brown, City Marshal Elected, was the last City Marshal and first Chief of Police.

=== Past and present chiefs of police ===
- December 1966 to November 2001 – Howard L. Brown, 1st Chief of Police, Deceased
- November 2001 to May 2002, Robert Ahring, Acting Chief of Police, Retired
- May 2002 to October 2017, Wayne I. McCoy, 2nd Chief of Police, Retired
- October 2017 to Present, Robert Muenz, 3rd Chief of Police

== Structure ==
Chief of Police

Deputy Chief of Police

Operations Bureau, 1-Captain

- 3-Lieutenants
- 6-Uniformed Sergeants
- 1-Administrative Sergeant
- Uniformed Patrol
- Bike Patrol Unit
- K-9 Unit
- Traffic Unit
- Detention
- Animal Control
- Hostage Negotiation Team
- Drone Unit

Staff Services Bureau, 1-Captain

- 2-Sergeants
- Special Victims Investigations Unit
- General Investigations Unit
- Special Tactical Assistance Team, "STAT"
- Records Unit
- Property Unit

Community Services Bureau, 1-Captain

- 2-Sergeants
- Dispatch
- Professional Standards,
- Crime Prevention Unit,
- School Resource Officers "SROs",
- DARE Officers,
- Chaplains,
- Volunteers in Police Services "VIPS"

=== Ranks ===
Title	Insignia
Chief of Police	
Deputy Chief of Police	
Captain	
Lieutenant	
Sergeant	
Police Officer / Detective	
Probationary Police Officer	
Civilian Recruit in Training	

== Vehicles and patrol districts ==
The BSPD utilizes a variety of vehicles, the following are used for uniform patrol division: the Ford Utility, "Explorer", and Ford F-150 trucks. Animal Control uses Ford F-250 trucks. Command staff, non uniform supervisors and detectives drive a vast array of unmarked vehicles.

The Blue Springs Missouri Police Department is divided into four patrol districts. Two officers are attempted to be assigned to each district.

== Fallen officers ==
Blue Springs has lost two officers in the line of duty. A city marshal by gunfire in 1923 and a Municipal Court Bailiff who suffered a fatal heart attack in court in 1972.

On November 5, 1923, 63 year old Blue Springs City Marshal Alonzo Hertig responded to the Blue Springs Telephone Office early in the morning hours in response from a telephone operator requesting assistance after a man created a disturbance in the office and made advances toward the female operator. After Marshal Hertig's arrival a struggle ensured and Marshal Hertig sustained a gunshot wound to the stomach. Marshal Hertig, although mortally wounded was able to return fire on the twenty-six year-old suspect. Marshal Hertig and the suspect died at the scene.

Marshal Hertig was born in Pennsylvania in 1860. His father was a French immigrant. He was educated in the law and served in the profession in Chicago before moving to Blue Springs where he farmed for 23 years. Following his retirement from farming he was appointed as Blue Springs City Marshal on September 1, 1923, serving for just two months prior to his death. He was survived by a niece of the home a brother. Service were held in the Blue Springs Methodist Church.

On April 6, 1972 Blue Springs Municipal Court Baliff Elmer "Claude" Mowry was working a municipal court session at the Blue Springs Municipal Building located at 903 West Main Street. While performing his duties during court he suffered a fatal heart attack. He was transported to a near by hospital but was pronounced dead from a heart attack. He had recently retired from the Blue Springs Police Department as a police officer.

== See also ==
- List of law enforcement agencies in Missouri
- List of law enforcement agencies in Kansas
