= Jan Zimmermann =

Jan Zimmermann may refer to:

- Jan Zimmermann (footballer, born 1985), German football coach and former player
- Jan Zimmermann (footballer, born 1979), German football manager and former player
- Jan Zimmermann (volleyball), German volleyball player

== See also ==
- Jan Zimmerman, American government official
