= Missouri State Marshal =

State Marshal of Missouri
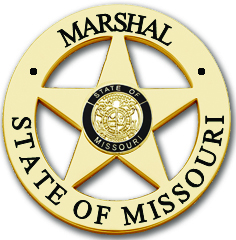
- Missouri State Marshal Badge
- Type: State Marshal

As provided by Missouri State Statute 476.062, the Missouri State Marshals and Deputy Marshals are charged with the safety and security of State Courts, Judges, and staff and function as the law enforcement arm of the Missouri Judiciary. In addition to Supreme Court Marshals, Marshals are assigned to districts divided into Eastern, Western, Southern Missouri based out of St. Louis, Kansas City, and Springfield respectively. Marshals and Deputy Marshals are fully sworn and commissioned peace officers with statewide jurisdiction and are tasked with not only providing Courthouse security at the Supreme and Appellate Courts, but also for serving court orders and arrest warrants; as well as investigating crimes, including threats against Judges and Court employees. The Marshal of the Supreme Court of Missouri was the first state law enforcement official with statewide enforcement authority. Additionally, they can work with Judges and staff to do residential inspections, provide security to Judges away from the courthouse, protect visiting dignitaries, assist with information and cyber-security, as well as many other duties as assigned.

Missouri State Marshals are also charged with the task of protecting Communities and its peoples from fraud and wrongdoings by, of, and thru the Court systems and its personnel thereof. By and thru Marshals Constitutional Oath they are also tasked with ensuring people's Constitutional, Human, Natural, and Civil Rights are never violated.

== Issued Equipment and District Map ==
Marshals are armed with either the Glock 19 in 9mm Parabellum or Glock 23 in .40 S&W and must qualify several times per year. In addition, Marshals may carry pepper spray, tasers, and batons as needed.

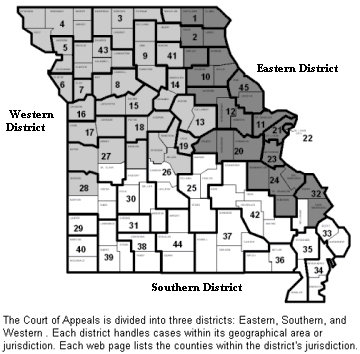
Map showing Eastern, Western, & Southern Districts

== See also ==
- List of law enforcement agencies in Missouri
- State police
- State patrol
- Highway patrol
