= Independence Police Department (Missouri) =

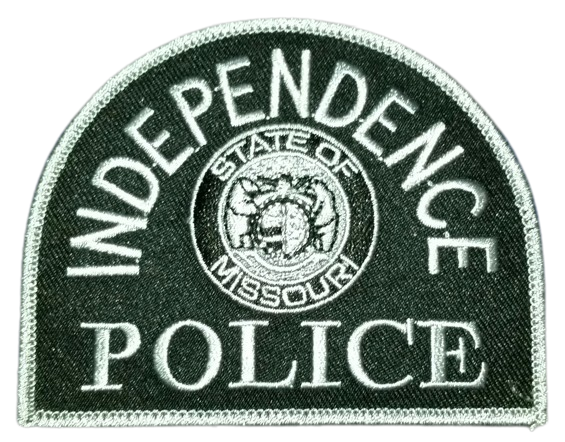
- Independence, MO Police Patch

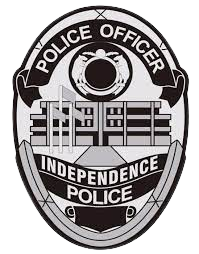
- Independence, MO Police Badge

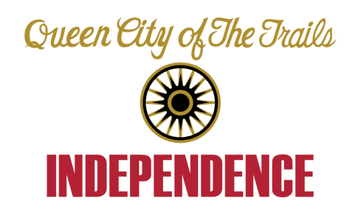
- Flag of the City of Independence, Missouri
- Common name: Independence Police Department
- Abbreviation: IPD

Agency overview
- Formed: August 8, 1882
- Preceding agency: Night Watch
- Employees: Over 300
- Annual budget: $25,081,229 (2008-2009)

Jurisdictional structure
- Operations jurisdiction: Independence, Missouri, United States
- Area: 78 square miles (200 km^{2})
- Population: 117,213
- Legal jurisdiction: Independence, Missouri
- General nature: Local civilian police

Operational structure
- Headquarters: 223 N Memorial Dr. Independence, MO 64050
- Police Officers: 194 (2023)
- Agency executive: Douglas Brinkley, Interim Chief of Police
- Units: Patrol; Accident Investigation; Selective Enforcement (Motorcycle); Special Weapons And Tactics (SWAT); K9 Unit; Community Services; Criminal Investigations Unit; Drug Enforcement Unit (DEU); School Resource Officers (SRO); D.A.R.E Unit; EOD Unit (Bomb Squad)

Facilities
- Buildings: 1 Central Police Building; 2 Police Sub-Stations; 1 Special Operations Building; 1 K9 Facility
- Police Dogs: 5

Website
- Official Site

The Independence Police Department serves the citizens of Independence, Missouri, a city of approximately 117,213 inhabitants (as of July 1, 2011) located in Jackson County, Missouri, just east of Kansas City. According to the department, its mission is "to protect life, individual liberty and the property of all people within the City of Independence; to develop and maintain a positive relationship with members of the community; and to foster a positive work environment for police employees." The department is also under the jurisdiction of the Jackson County Sheriff's Office.

== History ==
The Independence Police Department was created on August 8, 1882, when the "Night Watch" ordinance was repealed and a new ordinance entitled "Police" was approved. The "Police" ordinance allowed for a maximum of five men to be assigned to two watches, with a pay of $1.30/shift. The Independence Police Department has since grown to over 230 sworn police officers and 96 support staff.

== Resources ==
The Independence Police Department has a broad array of specialized services, including tactical operations (SWAT), K-9, bomb disposal, narcotics, accident investigation, motorcycles, crime scene investigations, community services, and school resource officers. The Ford Crown Victoria was the standard patrol car, the color scheme is black hood and trunk with white doors and grey decals that say Independence Police. The previous color scheme was all white cars with 2 red stripes going diagonal on the door and says Independence Police. With the discontinuation of the Crown Victoria, IPD has transitioned to the Ford Police Interceptor Sedan and Utility, now painted in all black. In 2017, IPD Officers began carrying the Glock 17 (9mm) as their issued sidearm. Prior to that, they carried the SIG Sauer P226R .357 sig. In 2023, the department began looking to replace the Glock Model 17 Gen 4 with a Glock Model 17 Gen 5 handgun.

== Fraternal Order of Police ==
Independence commissioned police officers and civilian employees can become members of the Missouri Fraternal Order of Police.

== See also ==
- List of law enforcement agencies in Missouri
- Independence, Missouri
