= Missouri Gaming Commission =

Gaming Commission overview
- Formed: 1993
- Jurisdiction: Missouri
- Headquarters: Jefferson City
- Gaming Commission executives: Peggy Richardson, Executive Director; Jan Zimmerman, Chair
- Parent department: Missouri Department of Public Safety
- Website: Missouri Gaming Commission website

The Missouri Gaming Commission regulates riverboat casinos, charitable bingo, and fantasy sports contests in Missouri. It is headquartered in Jefferson City.

== History ==
The Missouri Gaming Commission was established in 1993 to regulate excursion gambling boats. The Commission's role is to ensure the legality of licensed gaming operations, and to also ensure games are conducted fairly, according to their rules and with full disclosure. The Gaming Commission is overseen by five commissioners appointed by the governor and confirmed by the senate. The Missouri Gaming Commission is operated daily by an appointed executive director. There have been seven executive directors in the history of the MGC.

There are 13 riverboat gaming casinos in Missouri. The industry employs nearly 10,000 people with an annual payroll of $320 million.

On December 1 2025, sports betting became officially legal in Missouri and it recorded one of the most successful launch days in the U.S sports betting industry with 250,000 active sportsbook accounts created within the first 24 hours of legalization.

The Missouri Gaming Commission is a division of the Missouri Department of Public Safety.

On July 17, 2023, Jan Zimmerman became its first female to chair the commission.

== Disputes with Highway Patrol ==
On April 3, 2020, David Grothaus, the then-Executive Director, announced he would resign over a dispute with the state's highway patrol concerning the use of patrol officers at casinos. Grothaus sought to replace the officers with lower-paid MGC employees, which was resisted by both the patrol and the commission. A few weeks later, commissioner Dan Finney asked state auditor Nicole Galloway to conduct an audit of the agency. Finney cited his agreement with Grothaus's proposal as a motivating factor, arguing the commission was spending far more than it needed to.

Further controversy around the highway patrol's work with the commission arose when the commission authorized an investigation into its licensing practices in April 2020. An unknown whistleblower alleged that commission employees had altered or omitted material found in highway patrol reports on each of the state's 13 casinos. The commission paid the law firm of Graves Garrett $400,000 to conduct the investigation, which concluded in early 2021. The commission refused to make the report public, citing attorney-client privilege, which the Columbia Daily Tribune called a violation of the state's Sunshine Law. (The commission asserted the report fell under an exemption to the law). Commission member Dan Finney later claimed that the cost of the report was unnecessary and accused the commission's chairman, Mike Leara, of creating false charges.
