= Airport police =

Law enforcement agencies dedicated to policing airports

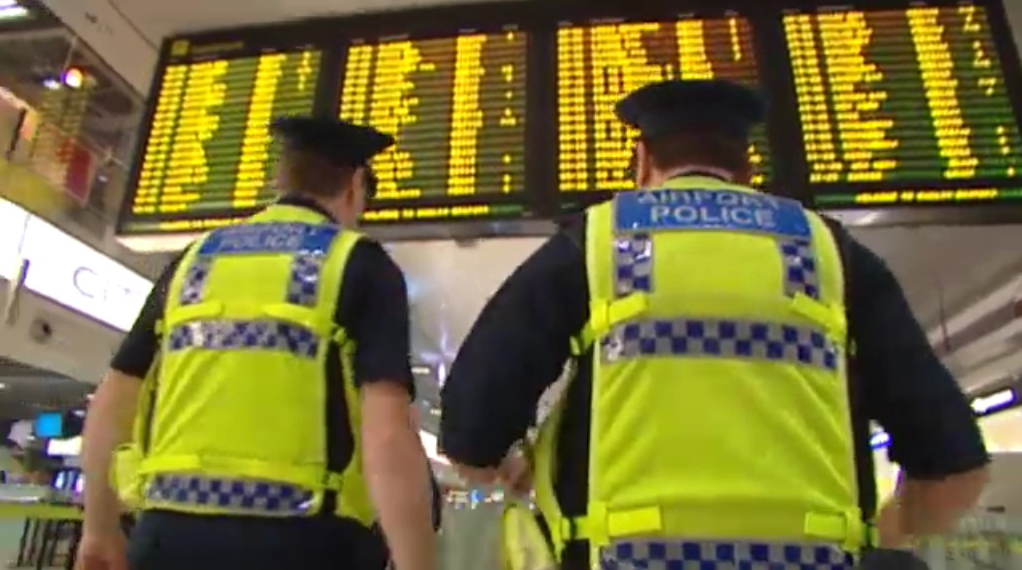
Airport policemen at Dublin Airport

Airport police units are a security police agency assigned to perform law enforcement functions at airports. They provide a wide range of law enforcement duties and responsibilities including patrol, investigation, traffic flow management, and control and response to airport emergencies. Airport police provide enhanced safety to airport employees, and to passengers. Officers can be found at security gates, throughout the terminal area, and around the airport’s perimeter.

In some cases, airport police are branches of larger general purposes agencies. "Airport Safety Officers," are cross-trained in Fire, Emergency Medical Services, law enforcement, and even military units. They support federal security directives and initiatives, airline security programs and passenger screening, enforce airport rules and regulations on the airfield and within secured areas, and assist with traffic and crowd control. Airport police agencies are vital components of the international aviation security system but do not, in themselves, perform all aspects of airport security force.

== In Asia and Oceania ==
- In India, security of airports is handled by the Central Industrial Security Force (CISF). CISF is focused on airport security and aviation threat management. The other agencies includes State Industrial Security Forces (SISFs).
  - Local police (State police) have jurisdiction over the entire airport, including terminals, for law and order and criminal investigations. They handle crime investigation, enforce local laws, and maintain public order in and around airport premises.
- In Indonesia, security in airports are handled by different agencies. The Indonesian National Police officers basically enforce law and order in the airport facility. Screening officers in the other hand are conducted by "Aviation Security" (abbreviated "AVSEC") personnel which wear blue uniforms and blue side caps. For parking, traffic control and external security of the airport are handled by Security guards which are administered under the Airport's management. As per 2015, the minister of transportation of Indonesia signed an MoU agreement with the Marine Corps to work together in improving the security of the ministry's public facilities including Railway stations and Airports throughout the country by posting several military members from the Marine corps to assist the Airport police in implementing security and order.
- In Singapore, The Singapore Police Force (SPF) operates The Airport Police Division (APD). The APD functions as the law enforcement agency, responsible for the maintenance of law and order within its jurisdiction of, Singapore Changi Airport and Seletar Airport. SPF is also the Appropriate Authority for security at the airport. Hence, APD, as the executive arm of the Police within the airport, is responsible for the development, implementation and maintenance of the National Civil Aviation Security Programme. It is to protect the security, regularity and efficiency of international civil aviation in the airport and safeguard against acts of unlawful interference aimed at passengers, personnel, aircraft, airport terminals or aircraft navigation installations and equipment.
- Hong Kong International Airport security is provided by Hong Kong Police Force's Airport Security Unit as well by civilian contractor Aviation Security Company Limited Hong Kong (AVSECO) personnel. HKPF officers are armed while AVSECO personnel are unarmed.
- In Pakistan, Airports Security Force (ASF) Provides law enforcement and Security for Airports.
- In the Philippines, airport police function in the country are jointly operated by the Philippine National Police - Aviation Security Group of DILG and Office for Transportation Security - Civil Aviation Security Bureau of DOTr. Both organizations facilitate security functions under the mandate of the Civil Aviation Authority of the Philippines.
  - Ninoy Aquino International Airport was staffed by the Manila International Airport Authority - Airport Police Department under DOTr which aimed to strengthen the security layer within the airport vicinity including terminals, gates and hangars.
  - Clark International Airport operate a separate airport security function under the jurisdiction of Bases Conversion and Development Authority - Clark Development Corporation and Clark International Airport Corporation - Airport Security Department.
- In Vietnam, each airport has its own Aviation Security Center. Each Aviation Security Center is under command of Civil Aviation Authority of Vietnam, which is a part of the Ministry of Transport.
  - Tan Son Nhat Airport, Ho Chi Minh City: Aviation Security Center of Tan Son Nhat Airport
  - Noi Bai Airport, Ha Noi: Aviation Security Center of Noi Bai Airport
  - Da Nang Airport, Dan Nang: Aviation Security Center of Da Nang Airport
- In Australia, the Australian Federal Police and Border Force officers look after security of the major airports.
- In South Korea, All Airport Policing are conducted by National Police Agency
- In Myanmar, airport policing is conducted by the Myanmar Police Force (MPF) through its Aviation Police Force.

== In North America ==
=== Bermuda ===
- In the British Overseas Territory of Bermuda, policing of the Bermuda International Airport passed from the Bermuda Police Service to the Ministry of Transport's own Airport Security Police in 1995.

=== Canada ===
- RCMP Sidney/North Saanich Detachment provides policing at Victoria International Airport
- RCMP Richmond Detachment provides policing at Vancouver International Airport
- Calgary Police Service is responsible for providing policing services at Calgary International Airport
- RCMP Edmonton International Airport Detachment is responsible for Edmonton International Airport
- RCMP Winnipeg International Airport Detachment is responsible for Winnipeg James Armstrong Richardson International Airport
- Toronto Pearson International Airport is patrolled mainly by Peel Regional Police Airport Division officers, but are assisted by the RCMP's Toronto Pearson International Airport Detachment. Before 1997 the RCMP was responsible for all policing at Pearson Airport.
- Ottawa Police Service Airport Policing Section provide airport police services at Macdonald-Cartier International Airport
- RCMP Airport Federal Investigation Section and Service de police de la Ville de Montréal Airport Unit provides policing and Aéroports de Montréal’s Airport provides Security at Montréal–Pierre Elliott Trudeau International Airport
- Halifax Regional Police provides policing at Halifax Stanfield International Airport

=== Mexico ===
- In Mexico, many divisions of police provide airport security and customs duties. The Directorate General of Civil Aviation (DGAC) (Spanish: Dirección General de Aeronáutica Civil) is the airport police division. It performs daily inspections and supervises airport facilities, aircraft, and aviation staff. The DGAC monitors compliance with rules and regulations, identification and elimination of acts, attitudes and conditions that are hazardous. They investigate airport accidents and incidents, and coordinate and implement the systems and safety procedures. The DGAC also coordinates its efforts with other federal authorities to ensure safety of the airport and flights. The Federal Police (PF) (Spanish: Policía Federal) act in the customs sections, as well as providing security throughout the terminal.

=== United States ===
- The DFW Airport Police Department is a force of roughly 200 officers that patrols an area of more than 17,000 acres and protects more than 60 million passengers annually. They are known for top-tier SWAT, K-9/EOD, and Motorcycle units

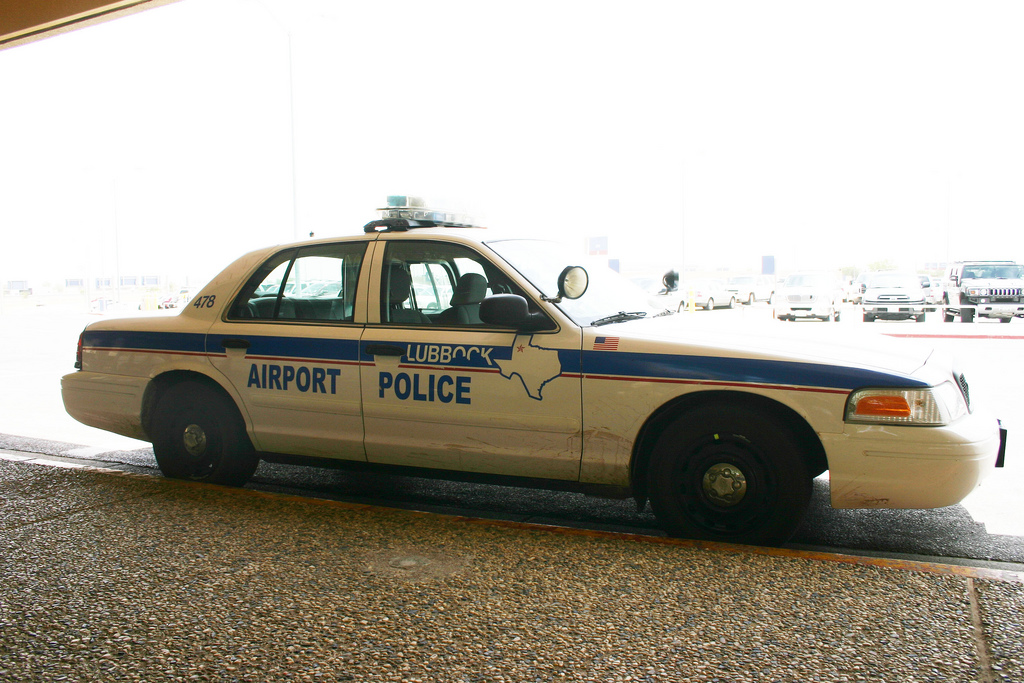
A Lubbock Airport Police Patrol Car

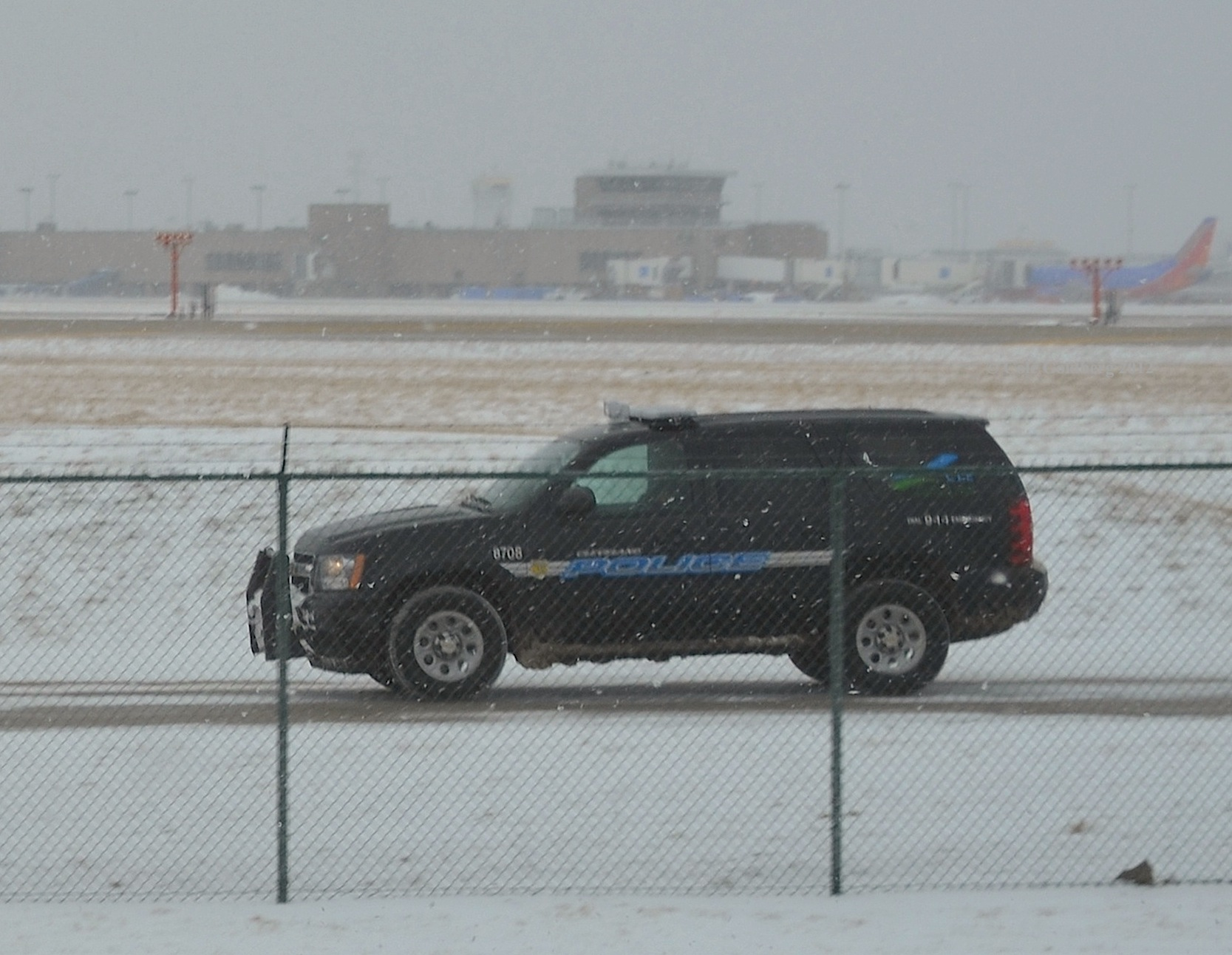
A Cleveland Hopkins International Airport Police officer patrols the airport perimeter in a Chevy Tahoe Police Cruiser.

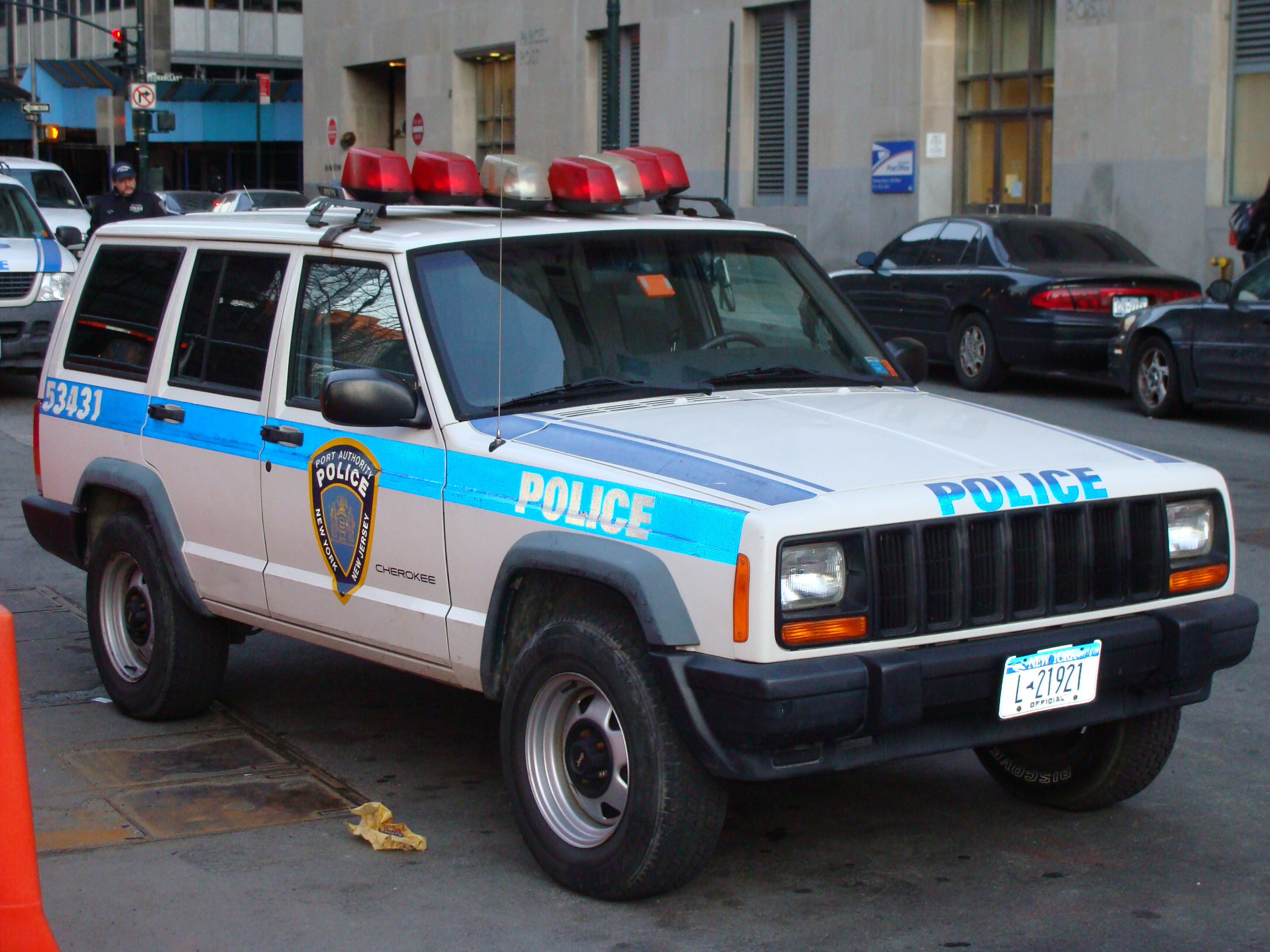
A PAPD vehicle

- The Cleveland Hopkins International Airport is patrolled by the Airport Unit of the Cleveland Police Department. The officers are permanently assigned to the airport, and provide a wide range of law enforcement duties and responsibilities including patrol, investigation, traffic flow management, and control and response to airport emergencies.
- The Columbus Regional Airport Authority Police patrol the three airports in the city of Columbus, Ohio that are owned by the airport authority. These airports are John Glenn Columbus International Airport, Rickenbacker International Airport and Bolton Field. The fourth airport in Columbus, OSU Don Scott Airport, is owned by The Ohio State University and is patrolled by The Ohio State University Police Department.
- The City of Chicago Department of Aviation Police perform safety, security and law enforcement functions at O'Hare International Airport & Midway Airport. The department was formerly called the Department of Aviation Special Police. The Chicago Police Department Airport Unit also performs many of the law enforcement duties in and around Chicago area airports. Chicago Department of Aviation is no longer certified in law enforcement and now provides security.
- The Wayne County Airport Authority Police provides law enforcement and security for Detroit Metropolitan Wayne County Airport and Willow Run Airport.
- The Los Angeles Airport Police of Los Angeles, California, is the second largest airport police agency in the United States, with over 1100 personnel, including over 450 sworn officers. In addition to LAX, Airport Police members are assigned to the other airports in the Los Angeles World Airports system – Los Angeles/Ontario, Van Nuys and Los Angeles/Palmdale.
- The Denver International Airport is patrolled by the Denver International Airport (DIA) police bureau. The officers are permanently assigned to the airport, and provide a wide range of law enforcement duties and responsibilities including patrol, investigation, traffic flow management, and control and response to airport emergencies.
- The Massachusetts State Police Troop F provide law enforcement, policing, and specialized aviation and seaport security services for all Massport properties including Boston Logan International Airport, Hanscom Field, Worcester Regional Airport, and the Massport waterfront in South Boston. Troop F is a unique entity within the Massachusetts State Police. Specialized assets provided by the members of the Massachusetts State Police Troop F include a dedicated Detective Unit, Bomb Squad, Community Services Unit, and Marine Unit. In addition, highly trained, federally certified State Police K-9 Teams are maintained on site. The smaller Massport Police Department provides physical security.
- The Milwaukee County Sheriff's Office provides law enforcement and security for Milwaukee Milwaukee Mitchell International Airport.
- The Minneapolis–Saint Paul International Airport is Patrolled by the Minneapolis-Saint Paul International Airport Police Department.
- The Omaha Airport Police protect Omaha Eppley Airfield and Millard Airport. They are separate, but co-jurisdictional with the Omaha Police Department, and are instead under the control of the Omaha Airport Authority.
- The Port Authority Police Department (PAPD), of The Port Authority of New York and New Jersey (PANYNJ) protects Newark Liberty International Airport, John F. Kennedy International Airport, and LaGuardia Airport, which handle over 80 million air passengers, over 1.1 million aircraft movements, and over 2.5 million tons of air cargo annually. Police personnel cover screening points, respond to all aircraft incidents, and aid travelers from all parts of the world. Escorting and protecting visiting dignitaries is provided for on a daily basis. The PAPD also patrols the Port Authority-owned Teterboro Airport in New Jersey. Stewart International Airport, is patrolled by the New York State Police. The PAPD is also responsible for fire fighting and crash emergency rescue at the four airports and for all other aircraft emergency incidents.
- At Salt Lake City International Airport, the airport police are responsible for law enforcement, which includes close cooperation with various federal, state and local agencies. The department is a separate organization, exclusively serving the airport, and is not a part of The Salt Lake City Police Department, though they share some functions, such as evidence and record-keeping.
- McCarran International Airport is patrolled by the Las Vegas Metropolitan Police Department, which has a dedicated Area Command (Sector Q) for the airport. The officers under the Airport Area Command patrol the airport itself along with the roadways surrounding it, including the airport connector.
- St. Louis Lambert International Airport is patrolled by the St. Louis Lambert Airport Police Department are responsible for law enforcement, which includes close cooperation with various federal, state and local agencies. The department is a separate organization, exclusively serving the airport.
- Miami International Airport is patrolled by the Miami-Dade Sheriff's Office
- Honolulu International Airport is under jurisdiction of the Hawaii State Sheriff.
- The Alaska International Airport System is under the jurisdiction of the Fairbanks International Airport Police and Fire Department and Ted Stevens Anchorage International Airport Police and Fire Department. Both have dual-role officers who are responsible for law enforcement, emergency medical, and aircraft rescue firefighting responses. They are sworn law enforcement charged with enforcement of state laws, airport regulations, and investigation of aviation-related incidents in partnership with the FBI, TSA, and FAA.

== In South America ==
- In Argentina, The Airport Security Police (PSA) (Spanish: Policía de Seguridad Aeroportuaria) provides public safety on airport grounds. It is a law enforcement agency created to protect and guard national public airports. The PSA protects and ensures the internal security within the airport's jurisdiction, through prevention and investigation. Preventative airport security includes planning, implementation, evaluation and or coordination of activities and operations, at the tactical and strategical level. The PSA attempts to avert the conspiracy of complex criminal acts, including drug trafficking, terrorism, smuggling and other related crimes.

== In Europe ==
- In the Czech Republic, The Police CR Provides law enforcement and Czech Airport Security Service provides Security for Airports.
- In Denmark, the Police of Denmark provides law enforcement and security for airports.
- In Finland, the Finnish Police Service provides law enforcement and security for airports.
- In France, the Air Transport Gendarmerie Branch of the National Gendarmerie provides law enforcement and security for airports and aircraft. The National Police provide law enforcement and security inside airport terminals by the Police aux frontières (border police) force.
- In Germany, the Federal Police provides law enforcement and security for international airports and major railway stations.
- In Ireland, the Airport Police Service (Irish: Póilíní an t-Aerfoirt) is a small private police force responsible for providing local policing and aviation security duties at the three state airports in Ireland: Dublin Airport, Cork Airport and Shannon Airport. Founded in 1936, they first became "Authorised Officers" in 1950. The national police, An Garda Siochana are the primary security and law enforcement agency and have a fulltime contingent stationed in the airport
- In Italy, The State Police Provides law enforcement and Security for Airports.
- In the Netherlands the Royal Marechaussee Provides law enforcement and Security for Airports, most notably at Amsterdam Schiphol Airport.
- In Norway the Norwegian Police Service Provides law enforcement and Security for Airports.
- In Poland, The Policja Provides law enforcement and Polish Airport Security Service provides Security for Airports.
- In Russia, The Politsiya Provides law enforcement and Security for Airports.
- In Spain, The National Police Corps and the Civil Guard Provides law enforcement and Security for Airports.
- In Switzerland, The International Security Police: Airport Unit (PSI) (French: Police de la Sécurité Internationale: Unité Aéroport) performs various tasks to provide security to the airport site and safety to airport buildings. This includes, traffic management for vehicles travelling and parking on airport territory, patrol of the airport’s runways, tarmacs, and parked aircraft. Foot patrols are used to ensure the safety of airport buildings in public transit areas, and airline offices to maintain order and public safety. PSI patrols ensure the closure of areas at risk in case of parcel bombs or suspect. The unit also controls migration, through the verification of travel documents and identity documents and can issue temporary emergency passports.
- In the United Kingdom it is generally the responsibility of local territorial police forces to provide armed patrols to each airport, for example the Metropolitan Police Service's Aviation Security Operational Command Unit, with responsibility for London Heathrow Airport and London City Airport. Northern Ireland has a different arrangement with a dedicated police force for Belfast International Airport.

Common battenburg markings used by European airport emergency services
Airport Police	Yellow / Blue
Airport Fire and Rescue service	Yellow / Red

== Representation ==
Airport Police Departments are represented in the United States by a membership organization called ALEAN or the Airport Law Enforcement Agencies Network.

== See also ==
- Airport security force
- Transit police
