= St. Louis Lambert Airport Police Department =

St. Louis Airport Police Department
- Common name: Lambert St.Louis Airport Police
- Abbreviation: SLAPD
- Motto: Honesty, Fairness, Professionalism

Agency overview
- Formed: 1972

Jurisdictional structure
- Operations jurisdiction: St. Louis, Missouri, United States
- Area: 2,800 sq mi (7,300 km^{2})
- Legal jurisdiction: St. Louis Lambert International Airport
- Governing body: Board of Aldermen of the City of St. Louis
- General nature: Local civilian police

Operational structure
- Headquarters: 10701 Lambert International Blvd, St. Louis County, Missouri 63145
- Police Officers: 72
- Agency executives: Brian E. Richenberger, Chief of Police
- Parent agency: City of St. Louis Airport Commission
- Child agency: St. Louis Lambert International Airport

Facilities
- Stations: 2
- Marked and Unmarkeds: Chevrolet Tahoe's, Chevrolet Impalas, Ford Explorers
- K-9s: 10 mixture of Labrador Retrievers, German Shepherds, and Belgian Malinois

Website
- St. Louis Lambert Airport Police Department official website

The St. Louis Lambert Airport Police is the airport police division of City of St. Louis Airport Commission (STLAC), the department that operates the airport in St. Louis, Missouri: St. Louis Lambert International Airport. It has more than 75 officers, security, and staff. Though it works very closely with the Metropolitan Police Department (SLMPD), SLAPD is a separate entity, primarily due to the airport police having specialized training and funding resources.

The Airport Police Department is a division of the City of St. Louis Airport Commission.

Merging the Airport Police Department with the police department of the city of St. Louis has been discussed.

== Canine Unit ==
The Canine Unit is staffed by police officers who handle 10 canines. The canines are available on a 24-hour basis to assist with seeking hidden explosives and narcotics.
