= Jan Zimmerman =

American government official

Chair of the Missouri Gaming Commission
- Incumbent
- Assumed office July 17, 2023
- Governor: Mike Kehoe
- Preceded by: Mike Leara

Personal details
- Education: Park University

Jan Zimmerman is an American government official serving as the chair of the Missouri Gaming Commission since July 2023. She is the first female to serve in the role. Zimmerman was previously the police chief of Raymore, Missouri from 2012 to 2022.

== Life ==
Zimmerman earned a bachelor's degree in criminal justice and master's degree in public administration from Park University. She is a graduate of the FBI National Academy and the University of Louisville Southern Police Institute.

In 1979, Zimmerman became a dispatcher for the Kansas City Police Department. She was sworn in as an officer in 1982. At the time of her retirement, she was a major. From 2012 to August 2022, Zimmerman served as police chief of Raymore, Missouri. During this time, she led the initiative to equip officers with body cameras and established the crisis intervention team program. Deputy Chief Jim Wilson succeeded her as police chief.

Zimmerman is the program director of the Surviving Spouse and Family Endowment Fund with the Kansas City Crime Commission. In 2021, Zimmerman joined the Missouri Gaming Commission. In July 2023, she was appointed by governor Mike Parson as the chair of the Missouri Gaming Commission, the first female in the role. She assumed the position on July 17, succeeding Mike Leara.
