= Missouri Department of Public Safety =

- Missouri Department of Public Safety

- Flag
- Abbreviation: DPS
- Motto: Service, Safety, Protection

Agency overview
- Formed: 1935
- Employees: 15,000
- Annual budget: $765,690,292

Jurisdictional structure
- Operations jurisdiction: Missouri, U.S.
- Jurisdiction of the Missouri Department of Public Safety
- Area: 69,715 square miles (180,560 km^{2})
- Population: 6,137,428 (2019)
- Legal jurisdiction: (Missouri) Statewide
- Governing body: Governor of Missouri
- General nature: Civilian police

Operational structure
- Headquarters: 1101 Riverside Dr Jefferson City, Missouri
- Director of MO DPS responsible: Mark S. James
- Agency executives: Troy Murdock, Deputy Commissioner of MO DPS; Courtney Kawelaske, Director of Strategic Services; Kylie Dickneite, Director of Homeland Security; Nathan Weinert, General Counsel; Mike O'Connell, Director of Communications; Tyler Hobbs, Director of Legislative

Website
- Missouri DPS website

The Department of Public Safety of the State of Missouri, commonly known as the Missouri Department of Public Safety (DPS), is a department of the state government of Missouri.

The agency is headquartered at 1101 Riverside Drive in Jefferson City.

== Divisions ==
DPS is divided into ten divisions & (including two commissions) :

- Office of the Director
- Alcohol and Tobacco Control
- Missouri Capitol Police
- Missouri Division of Fire Safety
- Missouri State Highway Patrol
- State Emergency Management Agency
- Missouri Veterans Commission
- Missouri Gaming Commission

=== Office of the Director ===
The Office of the Director provides administrative support for the Department of Public Safety, provides support services and resources to assist local law enforcement agencies, and provides training criteria and licensing for law enforcement officers. The office also administers the Homeland Security Program and state and federal funds in grants for juvenile justice, victims' assistance, law enforcement, and narcotics control.

=== Division of Alcohol and Tobacco Control ===
The Division of Alcohol and Tobacco Control is responsible for alcoholic beverage excise tax collection, liquor licensing along with liquor and tobacco enforcement, and providing training to licensees in these areas.

=== Missouri State Highway Patrol ===
The Missouri State Highway Patrol Division is responsible for law enforcement on state highways and waterways, criminal investigations, criminal laboratory analysis, motor vehicle and commercial vehicle inspections, boat inspections, and public education about safety issues.

=== Missouri Capitol Police ===
The Capitol Police serve as the primary law enforcement agency for the capitol complex, as well as other state buildings in Jefferson City, patrolling the buildings and grounds 24 hours a day, seven days a week.

=== Missouri Division of Fire Safety ===
The Division of Fire Safety provides training and certification to firefighters and emergency response personnel, investigates fires across the state, and has responsibilities related to the safety of fireworks, elevators, explosives, amusements rides, day care centers, and boilers.

=== Missouri Veterans Commission ===
The Veterans Commission employs over 1,500 employees and provides veteran services to over 500,000 Missouri veterans. Its function is to provide nursing care at seven state veterans' homes; provide burial at five state veteran cemeteries; and provide veteran benefits assistance through veteran service officers and grant partners.

=== Missouri Gaming Commission ===
The Missouri Gaming Commissionregulates charitable gaming (BINGO), riverboat casino gaming, and fantasy sports contests.

=== State Emergency Management Agency ===
The State Emergency Management Agency helps Missourians prepare for, respond to, and recover from disasters, including coordinating state disaster response and working with local, federal, and nongovernmental partners to develop state emergency plans.

== Organization ==
The Director of the Missouri Department of Public Safety is appointed by the Governor of Missouri. must be confirmed by the Missouri Senate The director is assisted in managing the Department by one deputy Director and several division directors.

- Director
  - Deputy Director
    - Administrative, Fiscal and Legal Services Division
    - Homeland Security Division
    - Missouri Capitol Police
    - Office of the Adjutant General
    - Fire Safety Division
    - Alcohol and Tobacco Control Division
    - Missouri State Highway Patrol
    - Veterans Commission
    - State Emergency Management Division
    - Missouri Gaming Commission
    - Inspector General
