= Skytanking =

Coordinates: 53°32′38″N 10°0′9″E

Skytanking Holding GmbH
- Type: Private
- Industry: Aviation fuelling
- Founded: 1998; 28 years ago in Hamburg, Germany
- Founder: Marquard & Bahls AG
- Headquarters: Hamburg, Germany
- Key people: Clinton Roeder, Amir Ibrahim, Christoph Lindke
- Owner: Prime Flight Aviation Services (2021- ) Marquard & Bahls (1998-2021)
- Number of employees: 1890 (2018.)
- Website: www.skytanking.com

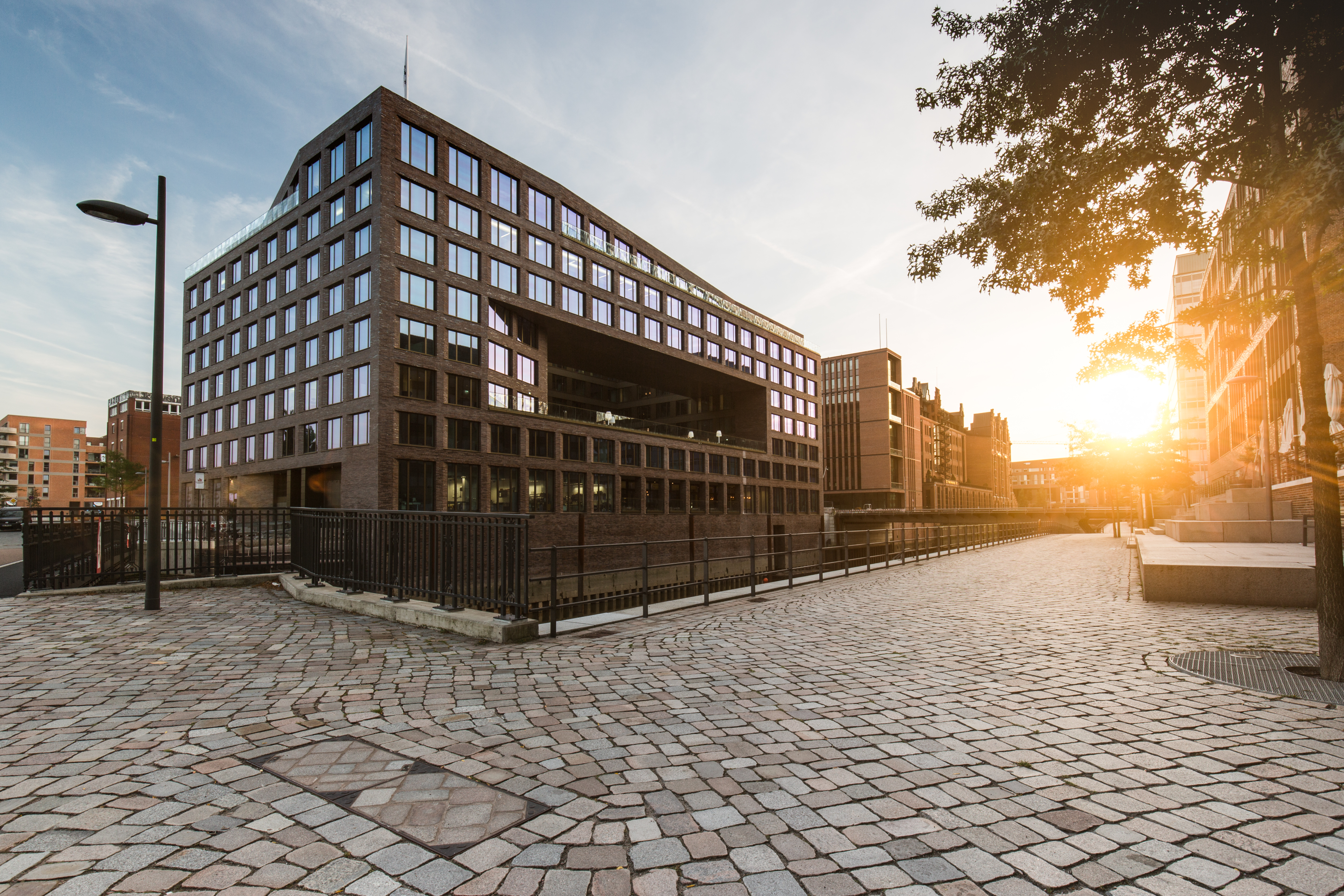
Headquarters of Skytanking Holding, Koreastraße 7, Hafencity, Hamburg (2016)

Skytanking provides aviation fuelling services including into-plane fuelling, aviation fuel storage and hydrant management, investment in aviation fuel facilities at airports and engineering. Founded in 1998, the company is a subsidiary of Prime Flight Aviation Services and is headquartered in Hamburg, Germany. It handles 23.2 million cbm of aviation fuel per year, refuels 2 million aircraft, and has operations at 83 airports in 14 countries in Europe, Asia, Africa and North America (as of: November 2019). Skytanking employed around 1,890 people in 2018.

== Customers and services ==
Skytanking's customers include airlines, airports, and oil companies. The company provides into-plane fuelling services, and specializes in funding, building and operating all parts of the on-airport jet fuel supply chain. The company finances, builds and operates airport storage and hydrants on a build, own, operate (BOO) or a build, own, operate, transfer (BOOT) basis. Examples include Bangalore, India, and Stuttgart, Germany.

== Company structure ==
=== Integration into the parent group and subsidiaries ===
Skytanking is one of Marquard & Bahls' mainstays of business, and is structured into more than 10 companies in four regions (Europe, Africa, Asia and North America). The majority of these companies are included in the Marquard & Bahls consolidated financial statement, the rest are associate companies. North Air, UK; IndianOil Skytanking, India; Luxfuel, Luxembourg; Skytanking Calulo, South Africa; Hydrant Refuelling System (HRS), Belgium; and Skytanking Ovenon, Turkey, include associate companies.

=== Management and personnel ===
Clinton Roeder, Amir Ibrahim and Christoph Lindke are managing directors of the Skytanking group of companies. In 2018, Skytanking employed 1,890 people at year-end.

=== Locations ===
German airport operations

The company is active in Germany, The Netherlands, Austria, Switzerland, Belgium, Luxembourg, UK, Italy, Malta, France, Spain, Turkey, United States, South Africa and India. Its German airport operations include Hamburg, Frankfurt/Main, Stuttgart, Cologne, Düsseldorf and Munich.

== History ==
=== From the beginning to 2010 ===
In 1998, the entry into aviation fuelling business led to the idea of purchasing Omnitank's 50-percent interest in Omni Aircraft Service at Munich Airport. At that time, the company was offered for sale to Marquard & Bahls AG, Skytanking's parent company. Skytanking was established as a separate division of Marquard & Bahls, Hamburg, in 2001. One year later, in 2002, Skytanking bought Merlin Fuels NV at the cargo airport in Ostend, Belgium, and positioned itself strategically in that region. In 2003, Skytanking started operations in Miami, United States, and was responsible for fuelling the two Star Alliance airlines United and Air Canada at Miami International Airport. Two years later, in 2005, the company acquired the Belgian Fuelling & Services Company, which handled half of the into-plane fuelling operations at Brussels International Airport. It also had an extensive portfolio of contracts to provide services for fuel companies at other European airports, including Athens International Airport, Luxembourg Airport and Liège Airport. Skytanking Zurich also launched into-plane operations in October 2005. In 2006, Skytanking Vienna started business activities in Austria. At the beginning of 2006, Skytanking and its partners Indian Oil and IndianOiltanking were granted a 20-year fuel facility concession for new Bangalore International Airport, India; the joint venture IndianOil Skytanking Limited launched its fuelling operations at Bangalore International Airport in 2008.

By mid-2006, aviation fuelling had become Marquard & Bahls’ third-largest business area, with Skytanking operating at 14 European and American airports and employing about 320 people around the world.

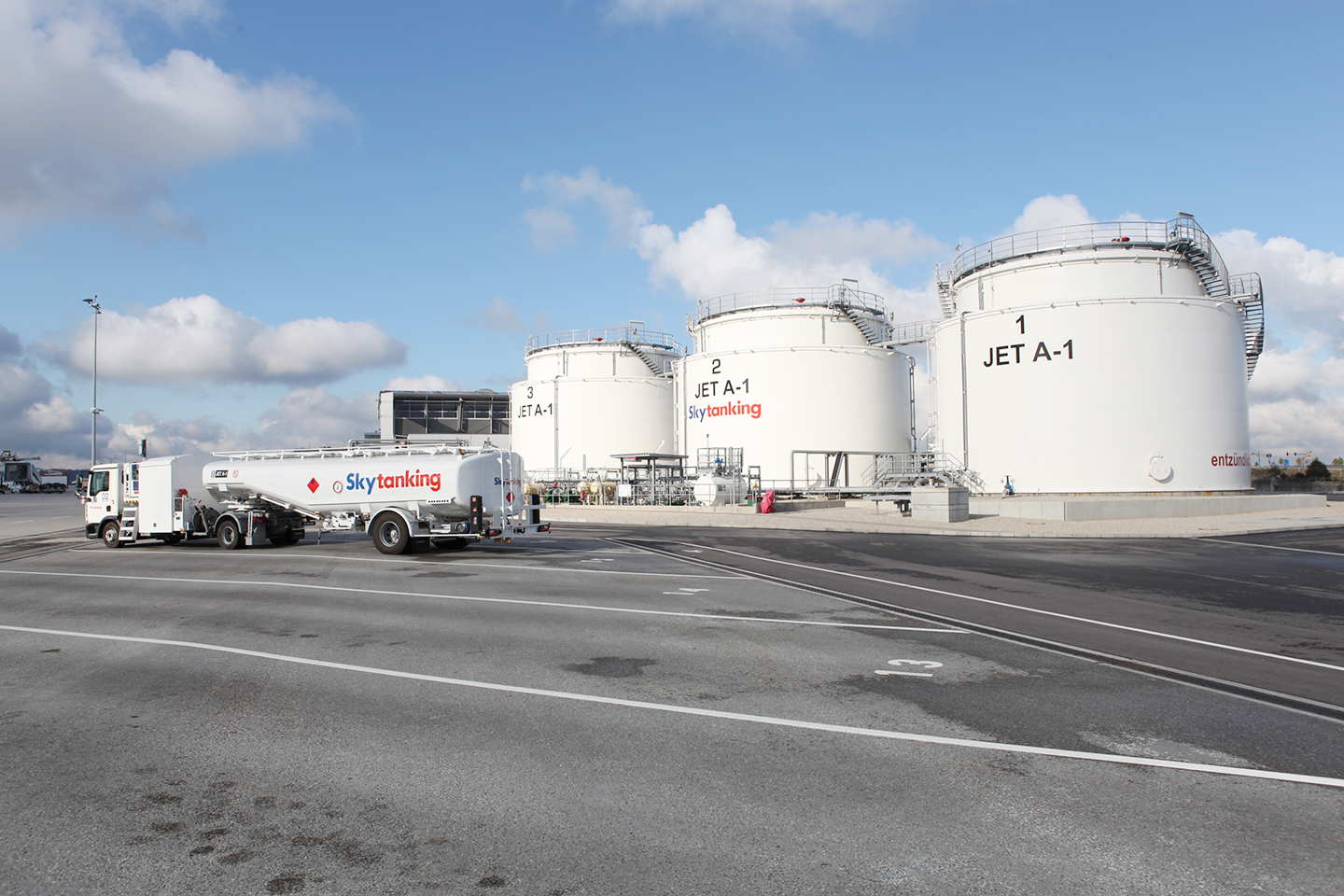
Tank-Fuel-Farm-and-Bowser-Truck

In 2007, Skytanking and Stuttgart Airport signed a 30-year BOOT contract for the construction and operation of the new aviation fuel storage facility, which opened in 2009. The new Indianapolis International Airport, USA, opened in November 2008; Skytanking was awarded a contract for management and operation of the fuel storage and hydrant system. In 2009, besides starting its facility operations at Stuttgart Airport, Germany, Skytanking took over AirFuel, a joint venture between Air France and Kuwait Petroleum Aviation France that worked in into-plane fuelling at Paris Charles de Gaulle Airport, handling more than 1 million tons of jet fuel per year. The acquisition marked Skytanking's market entry in France. In the same year, Skytanking purchased two aircraft-fuelling service companies in Italy, HUB Srl and PAR Srl, and provided aviation fuelling at five airports in this country: Milan Malpensa Airport, Milan Linate, Rome Fiumicino, Naples and Palermo airports, servicing over 200,000 aircraft per year. At that time, Skytanking's overall network comprised 26 airports in Europe, the US and Asia, employing 508 people.

=== Since 2010 ===
In 2010, Skytanking Calulo started aviation fuelling operations in Durban, South Africa, at the new King Shaka International Airport, including into-plane fuelling and the operation of the tank storage and hydrant system. Furthermore, Skytanking entered the into-plane fuelling market in the UK by acquiring 51% of shares in North Air Limited, a company that provided into-plane fuelling and jet fuel storage management services at 17 airports across the country. In 2012, Skytanking added jet-fuel storage and into-plane services at two more airports in France: Nice Côte d'Azur and Bordeaux Mèrignac. Later that same year, in November 2012, Skytanking began providing into-plane fuelling services at Frankfurt Airport – the 50th airport in Skytanking's portfolio. Frankfurt, alongside the existing sites in Munich and Stuttgart, gave Skytanking a presence at three of Germany's ten busiest airports by passenger volume; Frankfurt Airport was the third-largest airport in Europe, and the ninth-largest worldwide. In 2013, Skytanking USA added Austin-Bergstrom International Airport, Texas, to its network. Skytanking sold its subsidiary Skytanking USA with its 14 US sites to Aircraft Service International Group (ASIG) in 2014, and in return, took over ASIG's business at Munich, Vienna, Linz and Klagenfurt airports to strengthen its network in Germany and Austria. Following this transaction, the company was operating at 40 airports in 11 countries in Europe, Asia, and Africa. In addition, Skytanking started into-plane fuelling operations at Hamburg Airport, Germany, where its corporate HQ is located.

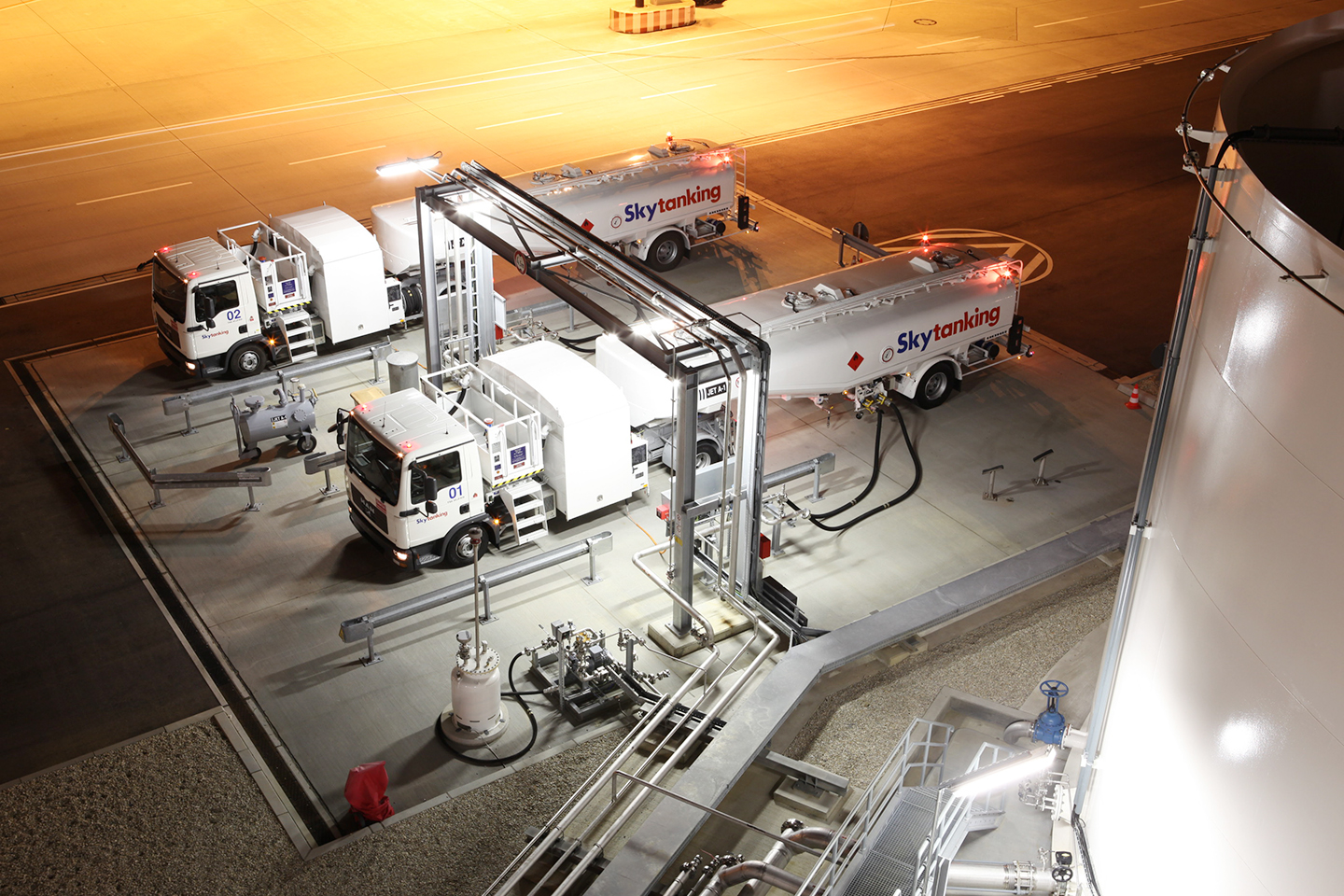
Skytanking Tank Fuel Farm and Bowser Trucks

In December, 2014, Skytanking completed the purchase of an 84-percent shareholding in Hydrant Refuelling System NV (HRS), which owned and operated the jet fuel storage and hydrant system at Brussels National Airport, Belgium. At the end of 2016, Skytanking and the Turkish company Ovenon founded the joint venture Skytanking Ovenon; it provided aircraft fuelling personnel to oil companies at 18 airports in Turkey including Istanbul, Ankara Esenboğa Airport and Antalya Airport.

In March 2017, Skytanking was re-awarded the contract for aviation fuel storage and hydrant system management at Munich Airport, where it has operated the fuel facilities since 1999. One month later, in April 2017, Skytanking Limited, a joint venture between Skytanking and the Maltese company Attard Services Limited, started into-plane fuelling operations at Malta International Airport. In October 2017, Skytanking completed the acquisition of the employees and assets of Sun Jet Services at Germany's Frankfurt, Düsseldorf and Cologne airports. As Turkey is an emerging aviation hub, Skytanking Ovenon AS has taken over the aviation fuelling operations of Petrol Ofisi Vitol in Turkey in May 2018, offering into-plane fuelling and tank farm management services at 21 Turkish airports today. In April 2019, Skytanking added another country to its network with Barcelona El Prat Airport in Spain; Spain is the third largest aviation market in Europe. Barcelona is the first location where Skytanking operates, followed by Valencia in May 2019.

In April 2021 Skytanking was sold to PrimeFlight Aviation Services, Inc. The former parent company Marquard & Bahls holds a minority stake in PrimeFlight and indirectly participates in Skytanking after the closing of the transaction in April 2021.
