= Missouri State Highway Patrol =

- Patch of Missouri State Highway Patrol
- Abbreviation: MSHP
- Motto: Together Protecting Missouri's Citizens; Simul protegens Missouri scriptor Cives (Latin)

Agency overview
- Formed: April 24, 1931; 95 years ago
- Employees: 2,336.00 (as of 2021)
- Annual budget: $366,805,718 (2021)

Jurisdictional structure
- Operations jurisdiction: Missouri, U.S.
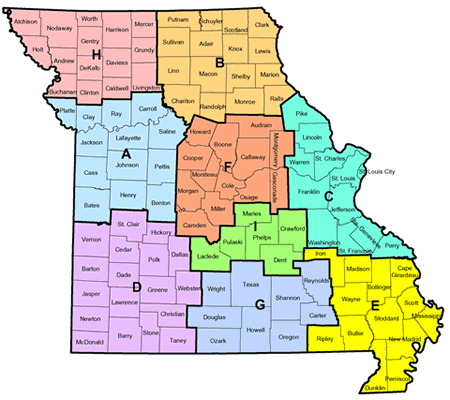
- Missouri State Highway Patrol Troops
- Area: 69,704 square miles (180,530 km^{2})
- Population: 6,083,672 (2016)
- Legal jurisdiction: (Missouri) Statewide
- Governing body: Missouri Department of Public Safety
- General nature: Civilian police

Operational structure
- Headquarters: 1510 East Elm Street Jefferson City, Missouri 65102
- Troopers: 952 (authorized minimum, as of 2024)
- Civilian employees: 1,289 (as of 2020)
- Director of MO DPS responsible: Mark James
- Agency executives: Colonel Michael A. Turner, Superintendent; Lieutenant Colonel Wallace V. Ahrens, Assistant Superintendent
- Parent agency: Missouri Department of Public Safety

Facilities
- Troops: 9
- Dogs: 11 German Shepherds

Notables
- Anniversary: April 24, 1931

Website
- MSHP Website

The Missouri State Highway Patrol (MSHP) is the highway patrol agency for Missouri and has jurisdiction all across the state. It is a division of the Missouri Department of Public Safety. Colonel Michael A. Turner has been serving as the 25th superintendent since January 30, 2025.

In 1992, MSHP became the 10th state law enforcement agency to receive accreditation from the Commission on Accreditation for Law Enforcement Agencies (CALEA).

== Purpose ==
State laws pertaining to the Highway Patrol including its creation, powers, structure, mission and duties are specified in Chapter 43 of Missouri Revised Statutes (RSMo). According to Chapter 43.025 RSMo: "The primary purpose of the highway patrol is to enforce the traffic laws and promote safety upon the highways. In addition the Missouri State Highway Patrol has responsibility in criminal interdiction which involves the suppression of marijuana, cocaine, and narcotics on the state's roads and highways including the Missouri Interstate System. As near as practicable all personnel of the patrol shall be used for carrying out these purposes." The MSHP has a criminal investigation division that investigates crimes statewide such as murder, robbery, burglary, rape and financial crimes.

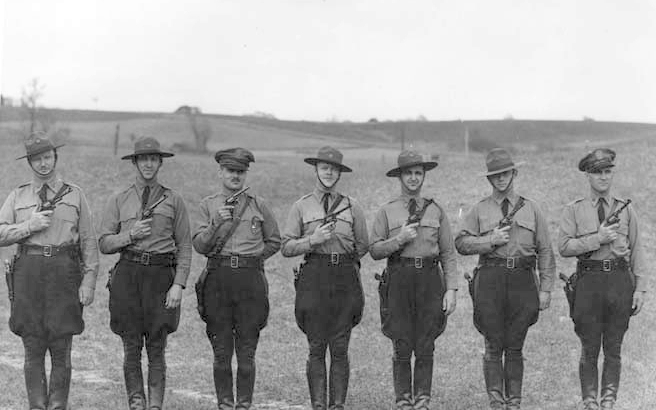
Missouri State Highway Patrol officers (circa 1910)

== Organization & Troops ==
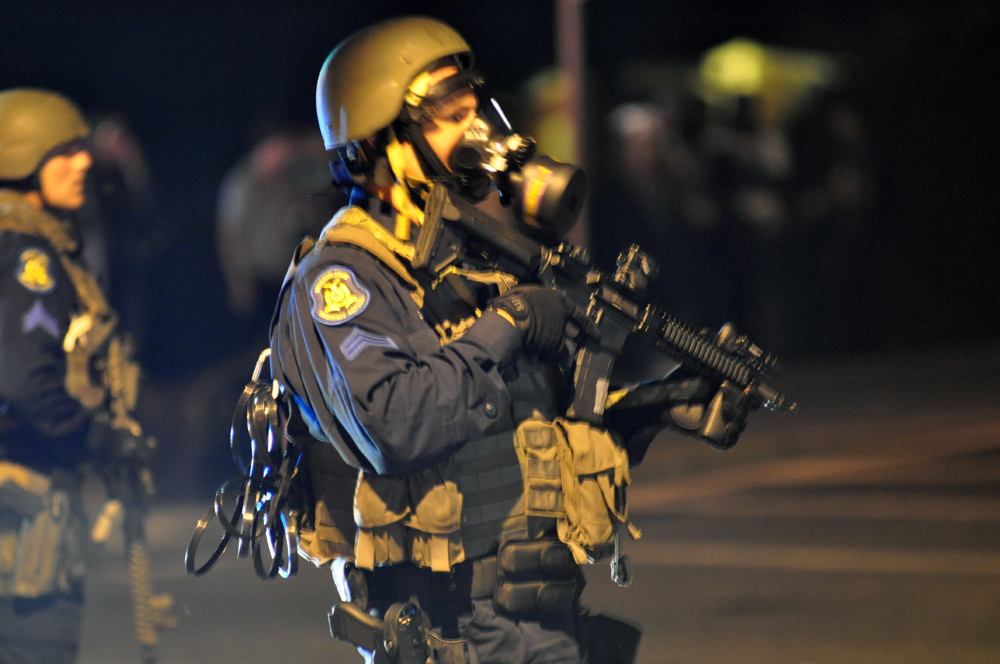
A state trooper during the Ferguson unrest, September 2014

General Headquarters (GHQ) and the Law Enforcement Academy are located in Jefferson City, Missouri, the state capital.

The state is divided into nine Troops, with Troop headquarters and communications centers located in the following cities:

- Troop A: Lee's Summit (Kansas City)
- Troop B: Macon
- Troop C: Weldon Spring (St. Louis)
- Troop D: Springfield
- Troop E: Poplar Bluff
- Troop F: Jefferson City
- Troop G: Willow Springs
- Troop H: St. Joseph
- Troop I: Rolla

In addition, three of the Troops maintain service centers:

- Troop C: Park Hills
- Troop D: Carthage
- Troop E: Sikeston
- Recruiting & Community Outreach Division is housed in the MSHP General Headquarters in Jefferson City, Missouri.

MSHP districts with their constituent troops and scale complexes
Troop A (Lee's Summit (Kansas City)	Troop B: (Macon)	Troop C:(Weldon Spring (St. Louis)	Troop D: (Springfield)	Troop E: (Poplar Bluff)	Troop F: (Jefferson City)	Troop G: (Willow Springs)	Troop H: (St. Joseph)	Troop I: (Rolla)
Troop A serves 13 counties: Bates, Benton, Carroll, Cass, Clay, Henry, Jackson, Johnson, Lafayette, Pettis, Platte, Ray and Saline.	Troop B serves 16 counties: Adair, Chariton, Clark, Knox, Lewis, Linn, Macon, Marion, Monroe, Putnam, Ralls and Randolph, Schuyler, Scotland, Shelby, Sullivan.	Troop C serves 11 counties: Franklin, Jefferson, Lincoln, Perry, Pike, Saint Charles, St. Francois, Saint Louis, Ste. Genevieve, Warren and Washington.	Troop D serves 18 counties: Barry, Barton, Cedar, Christian, Dade, Dallas, Greene, Hickory, Jasper, Lawrence, McDonald and Newton, Polk, Stone, Taney, Vernon, Webster.	Troop E serves 13 counties: Bollinger, Bulter, Dunklin, Iron, Madison, Mississippi, Cape Girardeau, New Madrid, Pemiscot, Ripley, Scott and Stoddard, Wayne.	Troop F serves 13 counties: Audrain, Boone, Callaway, Camden, Cole, Cooper, Gasconade, Howard, Miller, Moniteau, Montgomery and Morgan, Osage.	Troop G serves 9 counties: Carter, Boone, Callaway, Camden, Cole, Cooper, Gasconade, Howard, Miller, Moniteau, Montgomery and Texas, Wright.		

== Badge and rank structure ==
The Missouri State Highway Patrol is one of only five State Patrol forces that do not wear a badge on their uniform shirts. The Missouri State Highway Patrol uses a paramilitary rank structure and has the following ranks:

Title	Insignia	Notes
Superintendent (rank of Colonel)		The superintendent holds the rank of colonel and is appointed by the governor of Missouri. The superintendent must be confirmed by the Missouri Senate
Assistant Superintendent (rank of lieutenant colonel)		The assistant superintendent holds the rank of lieutenant colonel and reports directly to the superintendent (colonel). The lieutenant colonel has authority over the bureau commanders and is appointed by the colonel.
Major		Each of the six Majors is responsible for command of a bureau within the Highway Patrol and they are appointed by the Colonel.
Captain		A captain is generally a commander of one of the nine troops or many divisions within the agency.
Lieutenant		A lieutenant is the assistant commander of a troop or division.
Master Sergeant		A Master Sergeant is the supervisor of a group of troopers, corporals, and/or sergeants.
Sergeant		A Sergeant serves as a specialist or other non-supervisory capacity.
Corporal		Corporals are the first-line supervisors and are usually assigned as road supervisors within troops. In the absence of a Master Sergeant, they may act as the supervisor.
Trooper	No Insignia	Candidates successfully completing the academy and field training are appointed as troopers.
Trooper Cadet	No Insignia	The American Legion Trooper Cadet program provides an experience for young individuals who are interested in a career in law enforcement.

State Trooper (Recruit) is the initial rank of oncoming Missouri State Highway Patrol, held while undergoing training at the Missouri State Highway Patrol Law Enforcement Academy.

== Vehicles ==
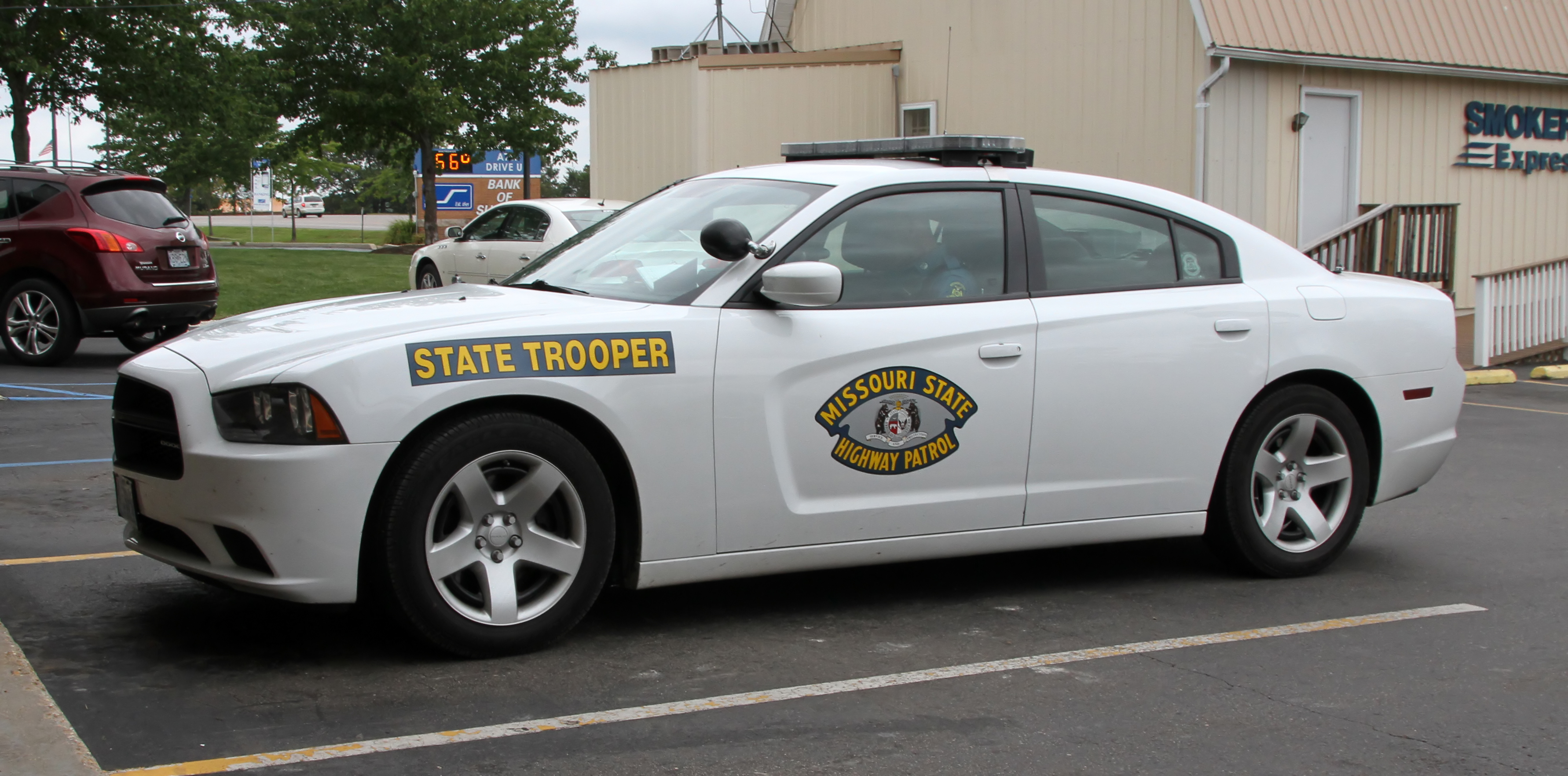
A Dodge Charger police car in MSHP service.

The MSHP utilizes a variety of vehicles, including but not limited to, the Dodge Durango, Dodge Charger, Ford Police Interceptor Utility (Explorer), Ford F-150 and 250 series, Ford Mustang GT (S650), Chevrolet Tahoe PPV, Ford Transit 250, and the Ram 2500 series. Both fully marked and semi-marked vehicles are used frequently. Colors include but not limited to: white, tan, blue, silver, black, gray, and maroon.

== Aircraft ==
The MSHP uses Bell 206B helicopters. In October 15, 2010 a Bell 206B helicopter of the MSHP crashed when it ran out of fuel, resulting in 1 death.

== Weapons ==
Lethal Options:

- Glock 45 Gen5 9mm (as of mid 2026) (Note: Equipped with Aimpoint COA)
- Glock 17 Gen5 9mm (phased out as of mid 2026)
- Glock 22 .40 S&W (phased out as of late 2018)
- Colt AR-15 (Rock River LAR-15) 5.56x45mm
- Remington Model 870 12 Gauge

Less Lethal Options:

- Pepper Spray (OC Spray)
- ASP Baton
- Taser

== Fallen Officers ==
32 Troopers have been killed while on duty since 1931 with one Highway Patrol member dying in World War II.

The members are as follows:

Rank	Name	Date of death	Cause of death	Age	Tenure	Location	Notes
Sergeant	Benjamin Oliver Booth	06-14-1933	Shot and killed along with Boone County Sheriff Roger Wilson while manning a roadblock in an attempt to catch 2 bank robbers	35	N/A	Intersection of U.S. Highway 40 and U.S. Highway 63; just north of his residence in Columbia, Missouri	
Trooper	Fred L. Walker	12-03-1941	Shot and killed while transporting 2 car thieves to jail; he failed to find a pistol on them and was shot going down the road	33	N/A	Near Ste. Genevieve and Bloomdale in Ste. Genevieve County	
Trooper	Victor O. Dosing	12-07-1941	Shot and killed in a cafe/apartment while helping Trooper Sam Graham, local officer John Love, and Justice of the Peace A.F. Stubbs arrest an Army Private wanted for murder	34	N/A	In the Coffee Pot Cafe one mile south of Galloway, Missouri and near Springfield, Missouri	
Trooper	James D. Ellis	10-16-1942	Killed in a Japanese prisoner-of-war camp; the only Missouri State Highway Patrol Trooper to die in the military	29	N/A	Manila, Philippines	
Trooper	Charles P. Corbin	09-15-1943	Killed while on patrol with Public Service Commission Inspector Ed Bilyeau; a tractor trailer came into his lane and hit him head-on while on a narrow bridge	27	2 years	On U.S. Highway 71 north of Carthage, Missouri	
Trooper	Ross S. Creach	12-12-1943	Struck and killed by a speeding car while helping a tow truck get a tractor trailer out of a ditch	24	1 year	U.S. Highway 36, 5.5 miles west of Shelbina, Missouri in Shelby County	
Trooper	John N. Greim	07-13-1945	Killed in a plane crash during a pursuit along with the plane's owner	32	N/A	Just over the Missouri-Arkansas line near Corning, Arkansas	
Trooper	Wayne W. Allman	10-27-1955	Killed in a car crash while en route to another crash	34	N/A	Intersection of Missouri State Route 35 and Missouri State Route B	
Trooper	Jesse R. Jenkins	10-14-1969	Shot and killed during a court sentencing hearing	29	N/A	In the Montgomery County Sheriff's Office in Montgomery City, Missouri	
Trooper	Gary W. Snodgrass	02-21-1970	Killed in a single car crash after losing control in a curve	24	6 years	On Missouri Highway 32; 7 miles east of Salem, Missouri in Dent County	
Trooper	William R. Brandt	06-12-1970	Killed when tornado-like winds put his car into a bridge abutment	23	2 years	U.S. Highway 36 near Macon, Missouri	
Trooper	Dennis H. Marriott	06-13-1981	Died from injuries sustained after being hit by a car during a traffic stop on 06-01-1981	36	N/A	U.S. Highway 54 in Jefferson City, Missouri in Cole County	
Trooper	James M. Froemsdorf	03-02-1985	Shot and killed while taking a wanted man to jail; the suspect got his hand free and stole Froemsdorf's gun	35	9 years	On I-55 near Brewer, Missouri	
Trooper	Jimmie E. Linegar	04-15-1985	Shot and killed while on a traffic stop with Trooper Allen D. Hines	31	9 years	At the intersection of U.S. Highway 65 and Missouri Highway 86 south of Branson, Missouri	A section of route 86 was named for Trooper Linegar in 2003.
Trooper	Russell W. Harper	02-08-1987	Shot and killed while on a traffic stop	45	18 years	East of U.S. Highway 65 and U.S. Highway 60 near Farm Route 189 in Greene County, Missouri	
Corporal	Henry C. Bruns	02-16-1987	Killed after the vehicle in which he was a passenger, lost control on the icy roadway and hit a bridge abutment	41	19 years	Missouri Highway 6 in Buchanan County	
Trooper	Robert J. Kolilis	11-21-1988	Struck and killed by a truck while investigating 2 stopped cars on the side of the road	24	1 year, 2 months	On Missouri Route M in Washington County near Irondale, Missouri	
Corporal	Michael E. Webster	10-02-1993	Struck and killed by a drunk driver while on a traffic stop	33	9 years	On U.S. Highway 40 in Blue Springs, Missouri in Jackson County	
Sergeant	Randy V. Sullivan	02-17-1996	Killed in a single car wreck after losing control and hitting trees while trying to pull over a speeding car	40	17 years	On Missouri Highway 72 in Madison County, 8 miles west of Fredericktown, Missouri	
Sergeant	David C. May	05-17-1999	Killed in a helicopter crash while having a photographer take pictures of the ongoing local Special Olympics	41	18 years	Behind the Union Planter's Bank in Poplar Bluff, Missouri in Butler County	
Sergeant	Robert G. Kimberling	10-06-1999	Shot and killed after pulling a suspect over who didn't pay for gas	43	14 years	On I-29 in St. Joseph, Missouri in Buchanan County	
Sergeant	Robert A. Guilliams	02-16-2001	Killed after losing control in the rain while responding to a car crash	41	17 years	On I-55 in Pemiscot County approx. 16 miles north of the Missouri-Arkansas state line	
Trooper	Kelly N. Poynter	01-18-2002	Struck and killed by a drunk driver while helping out at a car wreck	27	6 years	U.S. Highway 63 in Texas County; 2 miles south of Houston, Missouri	
Trooper	Michael L. Newton	05-22-2003	Struck by a truck and killed while sitting in his car with a driver he had pulled over	25	2 years	On I-70 near the 47 mile marker in Lafayette County	
Sergeant	Carl DeWayne Graham, Jr.	03-20-2005	Shot and killed after an ambush at his residence as he just got home	37	12 years	Van Buren in Carter County, Missouri	
Trooper	Ralph C. Tatoian	04-20-2005	Killed in a single car crash while responding to a manhunt for an armed bank robber in the Franklin County who shot at deputies in Gasconade County	32	9 years, 6 months	On I-44 in Franklin County	
Corporal	John A. "Jay" Sampietro, Jr.	08-17-2005	Struck and killed by a vehicle while directing traffic at a car crash scene	36	13 years	On I-44 near Stafford in Webster County, Missouri	
Trooper	Donald K. "Kevin" Floyd	11-22-2005	Struck and killed by a truck while on a traffic stop	45	21 years	U.S Highway 60 approx. one mile east of Missouri Route MM in Texas County, Missouri	
Corporal	Dennis E. Engelhard	12-25-2009	Struck and killed by a truck on the icy roadway while investigating an earlier crash	49	10 years	On I-44 east of Eureka, Missouri	
Sergeant	Joseph G. Schuengel	10-15-2010	Killed in a helicopter crash when his Bell 206B ran out of fuel	47	17 years	Near the intersection of Clarkson Road and Kehr Mills Road in St. Louis County	
Trooper	Frederick F. Guthrie, Jr.	08-01-2011	Drowned along with his K9, Reed, when they were swept away by high water while working Missouri River flood duty	46	17 years, 7 months	In the area of Big Lake near Missouri Highway 118 and Missouri Highway 111 in Holt County, Missouri	
K9	Reed	08-01-2011	Drowned along with his handler, Trooper Frederick F. Guthrie, Jr., when they were swept away by high water while working Missouri River flood duty	N/A	5 years	In the area of Big Lake near Missouri Highway 118 and Missouri Highway 111 in Holt County, Missouri	
Trooper	James M. Bava	08-28-2015	Killed in a single-car crash while trying to pursue a motorcycle	25	2 years, 2 months	On Missouri Route FF, just east of Audrain County Road 977 in Audrain County, Missouri	
Corporal	Lonnie Raymond Lejeune	12-10-2021	Contracted COVID-19 in the line of duty	58	26 years	N/A	

== Superintendents ==
The Missouri State Highway Patrol is headed by the superintendent of the Highway Patrol, who is nominated by the governor of Missouri and confirmed by the Missouri State Senate. The superintendent of the Highway Patrol commands more than 1,356 troopers and 1,87 civilian support staff who help provide a full range of policing and public safety services to Missourian on behalf of the Missouri State Highway Patrol.

Superintendent	Term began & term ended
Lewis Ellis	1931–1933
B. Marvin Casteel	1933–1939
Albert D. Sheppard (acting)	1939–1940
William J. Ramsey (acting)	1940–1941
M. Stanley Ginn	1941–1944
Otis L. Wallis (acting)	1944–1945
Hugh H. Waggoner	1945–1949
David E. Harrison	1949–1953
Hugh H. Waggoner	1953–1957
Hugh H. Waggoner	1957–1965
E.I. (Mike) Hockaday	1965–1973
Sam S. Smith	1973-1977
William A. Dolan (acting)	1977-1977
Alvin (Al) R. Lubker	1976–1981
Allen S. Whitmer	1981–1982
Howard J. Hoffman	1982–1988
John H. Ford	1988–1989
Clarence E. (Mel) Fisher	1989–1993
Fred M. Mills	1993–1997
Weldon L. Wilhoit	1997–2001
Roger D. Stottlemyre	2001–2006
James F. Keathley	2006–2010
Ronald K. Replogle	2010–2015
J. Bret Johnson	2015–2017
Sandra K. Karsten	2017–2018
Eric T. Olson (acting)	2018–2019
Eric T. Olson	2019–2025
Michael A. Turner	2025–present

== See also ==
- List of law enforcement agencies in Missouri
- State police
- State patrol
- Highway patrol

== Notes ==
Police appointments
Preceded by Sandy K. Karsten	Superintendent of the Highway Patrol; 2025–Present	Succeeded by Michael A. Turner
