= List of people executed in Missouri =

This is a list of people executed in Missouri following the 1976 Supreme Court decision in Gregg v. Georgia that allowed for the reinstitution of the death penalty in the United States.

== List of people executed in Missouri since 1989 ==
Since 1989, a total of 102 people were executed by the State of Missouri. All were convicted of first-degree murder and all were executed by lethal injection, although lethal gas remains a legal method of execution. Before April 1989, all executions were carried out at the Missouri State Penitentiary in Jefferson City. Between April 1989 and March 2005, executions were carried out at the Potosi Correctional Center in Mineral Point. Since April 2005, all subsequent executions have been carried out at the Eastern Reception, Diagnostic and Correctional Center in Bonne Terre. A condemned inmate and convicted double killer from Missouri, Lewis Eugene Gilbert, was executed in Oklahoma.

No.	Name	Race	Age	Sex	Date of execution	County or Independent City	Method	Victim(s)	Governor
1	George C. Mercer	White	44	M	January 6, 1989 (Note: This was the last execution held at the Missouri State Penitentiary in Jefferson City.)	Cass (Note: Was tried and convicted in Greene County.)	Lethal injection	Karen Keeton	John Ashcroft
2	Gerald Smith	White	32	M	January 18, 1990 (Note: This was the first execution held at the Potosi Correctional Center in Mineral Point.)	St. Louis City	Lethal injection	Karen Roberts (Note: Smith was also sentenced to death for the murder of fellow death row inmate Robert Baker.)	John Ashcroft
3	Winford LaVern Stokes Jr.	Black	39	M	May 11, 1990	St. Louis	Lethal injection	Pamela Benda	John Ashcroft
4	Leonard Marvin Laws	White	41	M	May 17, 1990	St. Louis	Lethal injection	Clarence Williams and Lottie Williams	John Ashcroft
5	George Clifton Gilmore	White	44	M	August 31, 1990	St. Louis	Lethal injection	Mary Luella Watters, Clarence Williams, Lottie Williams	John Ashcroft
6	Maurice Oscar Byrd	Black	37	M	August 23, 1991	St. Louis	Lethal injection	4 murder victims (Note: The 4 victims were: Judy Cazaco, James Wood, Edna Ince, and Carolyn Turner.)	John Ashcroft
7	Ricky Lee Grubbs	White	34	M	October 21, 1992	St. Francois	Lethal injection	Jerry Thornton	John Ashcroft
8	Martsay Bolder	Black	36	M	January 27, 1993	Randolph	Lethal injection	Theron King (Note: Bolder also received a life sentence for the murder of Louis Donovan.)	Mel Carnahan
9	Walter Junior Blair	Black	32	M	July 21, 1993	Jackson	Lethal injection	Katherine Jo Allen	Mel Carnahan
10	Frederick Lashley	Black	29	M	July 28, 1993	St. Louis City	Lethal injection	Janie Tracy	Mel Carnahan
11	Frank Joseph Guinan	White	48	M	October 6, 1993	Franklin	Lethal injection	John McBroom (Note: Guinan was also sentenced to death for the murder of fellow death row inmate Robert Baker.)	Mel Carnahan
12	Emmitt Foster	Black	44	M	May 3, 1995	St. Louis	Lethal injection	Travis Walker	Mel Carnahan
13	Larry Griffin	Black	41	M	June 21, 1995	St. Louis City	Lethal injection	Quintin Moss (Note: Griffin also received a 10-year sentence for the murder of Sylvester Crawford.)	Mel Carnahan
14	Robert Anthony Murray	Black	32	M	July 26, 1995	St. Louis City	Lethal injection	Jeffrey Jackson and Craig Stewart	Mel Carnahan
15	Robert T. Sidebottom	White	33	M	November 15, 1995	Jackson	Lethal injection	May Sidebottom	Mel Carnahan
16	Anthony Joe Larette Jr.	White	44	M	November 29, 1995	St. Charles (Note: Was tried and convicted in Warren County.)	Lethal injection	Mary Fleming	Mel Carnahan
17	Robert Earl O'Neal Jr.	White	34	M	December 6, 1995	Butler	Lethal injection	Arthur Dade (Note: O'Neal also received a life sentence for the murder of Ralph Roscoe Sharick.)	Mel Carnahan
18	Jeffrey Paul Sloan	White	29	M	February 21, 1996	Clay	Lethal injection	4 murder victims (Note: The 4 victims were: Paul Sloan, Judith Sloan, Timothy Sloan, and Jason Sloan, Sloan was only convicted of killing Jason Sloan)	Mel Carnahan
19	Doyle James Williams	White	49	M	April 10, 1996	Clay	Lethal injection	A. H. Domann and Kerry Bummett	Mel Carnahan
20	Emmett Clifton Nave	Native American	56	M	July 31, 1996	St. Charles	Lethal injection	Geneva Roling	Mel Carnahan
21	Thomas Henry Battle	Black	34	M	August 7, 1996	St. Louis City	Lethal injection	Birdie Johnson	Mel Carnahan
22	Richard Oxford	White	40	M	August 21, 1996	Platte	Lethal injection	Harold Wampler and Melba Wampler	Mel Carnahan
23	Richard Steven Zeitvogel	White	40	M	December 11, 1996	Cole	Lethal injection	Gary Wayne Dew (Note: Zeitvogel also received a life sentence for the murder of John McBroom.)	Mel Carnahan
24	Eric Adam Schneider	White	36	M	January 29, 1997	Jefferson	Lethal injection	Richard Schwendeman and Ronald Thompson	Mel Carnahan
25	Ralph Cecil Feltrop	White	42	M	August 6, 1997	Jefferson	Lethal injection	Barbara Ann Roam	Mel Carnahan
26	Donald Edward Reese	White	54	M	August 13, 1997	Jefferson	Lethal injection	4 murder victims (Note: The 4 victims were: James Watson, Christopher Griffith, John Buford, and Don Vanderlinden.)	Mel Carnahan
27	Andrew Wessel Six	White	32	M	August 20, 1997	Schuyler	Lethal injection	Kathy Allen	Mel Carnahan
28	Samuel Lee McDonald Jr.	Black	49	M	September 24, 1997	St. Louis City	Lethal injection	St. Louis County Police Officer Robert Jordan	Mel Carnahan
29	Alan Jeffrey Bannister	White	39	M	October 24, 1997	McDonald	Lethal injection	Darrell Ruestman	Mel Carnahan
30	Reginald Love Powell	Black	29	M	February 25, 1998	St. Louis City	Lethal injection	Freddie Miller and Arthur Miller	Mel Carnahan
31	Milton Vincent Griffin-El	Black	37	M	March 25, 1998	St. Louis City	Lethal injection	Jerome Redden	Mel Carnahan
32	Glennon Paul Sweet	White	43	M	April 22, 1998	Clay	Lethal injection	Missouri State Trooper Russell Harper	Mel Carnahan
33	Kelvin Shelby Malone	Black	38	M	January 13, 1999	St. Louis	Lethal injection	William Parr (Note: He was also sentenced to death by the state of California for the murder of Myrtle Benham.)	Mel Carnahan
34	James Edward Rodden Jr.	White	39	M	February 24, 1999	Clay	Lethal injection	Terry Trunnel and Joseph Arnold	Mel Carnahan
35	Roy Michael Roberts	White	45	M	March 10, 1999	Marion	Lethal injection	Correctional officer Tom Jackson	Mel Carnahan
36	Roy Ramsey Jr.	Black	46	M	April 14, 1999	Jackson	Lethal injection	Garnett Ledford and Betty Ledford	Mel Carnahan
37	Ralph E. Davis	Black	61	M	April 28, 1999	Boone	Lethal injection	Susan Davis	Mel Carnahan
38	Jessie Lee Wise	Black	46	M	May 26, 1999	St. Louis	Lethal injection	Geraldine McDonald (Note: Wise was previously convicted of murdering Ralph Gianino.)	Mel Carnahan
39	Bruce Kilgore	Black	39	M	June 16, 1999	St. Louis City	Lethal injection	Marilyn Wilkins	Mel Carnahan
40	Robert Allen Walls	White	34	M	June 30, 1999	St. Louis	Lethal injection	Fred Harmon	Mel Carnahan
41	David R. Leisure	White	49	M	September 1, 1999	St. Louis City	Lethal injection	James A. Michaels Sr.	Mel Carnahan
42	James Henry Hampton	White	62	M	March 22, 2000	Callaway	Lethal injection	Frances Keaton	Mel Carnahan
43	Bert Leroy Hunter	White	53	M	June 28, 2000	Cole	Lethal injection	Mildred Hodges and Richard Hodges	Mel Carnahan
44	Gary Lee Roll	White	48	M	August 30, 2000	Boone	Lethal injection	Sherry Scheper, Randy Scheper and Curtis Scheper	Mel Carnahan
45	George Bernard Harris	Black	41	M	September 13, 2000	Jackson	Lethal injection	Stanley Willoughby	Mel Carnahan
46	James Wilson Chambers	White	48	M	November 15, 2000	Jefferson	Lethal injection	Jerry Lee Oestricker	Roger B. Wilson
47	Stanley Dewaine Lingar	White	37	M	February 7, 2001	Ripley (Note: Was tried and convicted in St. Francois County.)	Lethal injection	Thomas Scott Allen	Bob Holden
48	Tomas Grant Ervin	White	50	M	March 28, 2001	Cole	Lethal injection	Mildred Hodges and Richard Hodges	Bob Holden
49	Mose Young Jr.	Black	45	M	April 25, 2001	St. Louis City	Lethal injection	Kent Bicknese, James Schneider and Sol Marks	Bob Holden
50	Samuel D. Smith	Black	40	M	May 23, 2001	Callaway	Lethal injection	Marlin May (Note: Smith also received a 14-year sentence for the murder of Zita Casey.)	Bob Holden
51	Jerome Mallett	Black	42	M	July 11, 2001	Perry	Lethal injection	Missouri State Trooper James F. Froemsdorf	Bob Holden
52	Michael S. Roberts	White	27	M	October 3, 2001	St. Louis	Lethal injection	Mary L. Taylor	Bob Holden
53	Stephen K. Johns	White	55	M	October 24, 2001	St. Louis City	Lethal injection	Donald Voepel	Bob Holden
54	James R. Johnson	White	52	M	January 9, 2002	Moniteau	Lethal injection	4 murder victims (Note: The 4 victims were: Deputy Sheriff Leslie B. Roark, Pam Jones, Sheriff Charles Smith, and Deputy Sheriff Sandra Wilson.)	Bob Holden
55	Michael I. Owsley	Black	40	M	February 6, 2002	Jackson	Lethal injection	Elvin Iverson	Bob Holden
56	Jeffrey Lane Tokar	White	37	M	March 6, 2002	Warren	Lethal injection	Johnny Douglass	Bob Holden
57	Paul W. Kreutzer	White	30	M	April 10, 2002	Callaway	Lethal injection	Louise Hemphill	Bob Holden
58	Daniel Anthony Basile	White	35	M	August 14, 2002	St. Charles	Lethal injection	Elizabeth DeCaro	Bob Holden
59	William Robert Jones Jr.	White	38	M	November 20, 2002	Jackson	Lethal injection	Stanley Albert	Bob Holden
60	Kenneth Kenley	White	42	M	February 5, 2003	Butler	Lethal injection	Ronald Felts	Bob Holden
61	John Clayton Smith	White	41	M	October 29, 2003	Audrain	Lethal injection	Brandie Kearnes and Wayne Hoewing	Bob Holden
62	Stanley L. Hall	Black	37	M	March 16, 2005 (Note: This was the last execution held at the Potosi Correctional Center in Mineral Point.)	St. Louis	Lethal injection	Barbara Jo Wood	Matt Blunt
63	Donald Jones	Black	38	M	April 27, 2005 (Note: This was the first execution held at the Eastern Reception, Diagnostic and Correctional Center in Bonne Terre.)	St. Louis City	Lethal injection	Dorothy Knuckles	Matt Blunt
64	Vernon Brown	Black	51	M	May 18, 2005	St. Louis City	Lethal injection	Janet Perkins and Synetta Ford	Matt Blunt
65	Timothy L. Johnston	White	44	M	August 31, 2005	St. Louis City	Lethal injection	Nancy Johnston	Matt Blunt
66	Marlin Andrew Gray	Black	38	M	October 26, 2005	St. Louis City	Lethal injection	Julie Kerry and Robin Kerry	Matt Blunt
67	Dennis James Skillicorn	White	49	M	May 20, 2009	Lafayette	Lethal injection	Richard Drummond	Jay Nixon
68	Martin C. Link	White	47	M	February 9, 2011	St. Louis City	Lethal injection	Elissa Self	Jay Nixon
69	Joseph Paul Franklin	White	63	M	November 20, 2013	St. Louis	Lethal injection	Gerald Gordon	Jay Nixon
70	Allen L. Nicklasson	White	41	M	December 11, 2013	Lafayette	Lethal injection	Richard Drummond	Jay Nixon
71	Herbert L. Smulls	Black	56	M	January 29, 2014	St. Louis	Lethal injection	Stephen Honickman	Jay Nixon
72	Michael Anthony Taylor	Black	47	M	February 26, 2014	Jackson	Lethal injection	Ann Marie Harrison	Jay Nixon
73	Jeffrey R. Ferguson	White	59	M	March 26, 2014	St. Louis	Lethal injection	Kelli Hall	Jay Nixon
74	William Lewis Rousan	White	57	M	April 23, 2014	St. Francois	Lethal injection	Charles Lewis and Grace Lewis	Jay Nixon
75	John E. Winfield	Black	43	M	June 18, 2014	St. Louis	Lethal injection	Arthea Sanders and Shawnee Murphy	Jay Nixon
76	John C. Middleton	White	54	M	July 16, 2014	Harrison	Lethal injection	Alfred Pinegar, Stacy Hodge and Randy Hamilton	Jay Nixon
77	Michael Shane Worthington	White	43	M	August 6, 2014	St. Charles	Lethal injection	Melinda Griffin	Jay Nixon
78	Earl Ringo Jr.	Black	40	M	September 10, 2014	Boone	Lethal injection	Dennis Poyser and Joanna Baysinger	Jay Nixon
79	Leon Vincent Taylor	Black	56	M	November 19, 2014	Jackson	Lethal injection	Robert Newton	Jay Nixon
80	Paul Terrence Goodwin	White	48	M	December 10, 2014	St. Louis	Lethal injection	Joan Crotts	Jay Nixon
81	Walter Timothy Storey	White	47	M	February 11, 2015	St. Charles	Lethal injection	Jill Frey	Jay Nixon
82	Cecil Lee Clayton	White	74	M	March 17, 2015	Barry	Lethal injection	Barry County Deputy Christopher Castetter	Jay Nixon
83	Andre Vincent Cole	Black	52	M	April 14, 2015	St. Louis	Lethal injection	Anthony Curtis	Jay Nixon
84	Richard Lamont Strong	Black	48	M	June 9, 2015	St. Louis	Lethal injection	Eva Washington and Zandrea Thomas	Jay Nixon
85	David Stanley Zink	White	55	M	July 14, 2015	St. Clair	Lethal injection	Amanda Morton	Jay Nixon
86	Roderick Nunley	Black	50	M	September 1, 2015	Jackson	Lethal injection	Ann Marie Harrison	Jay Nixon
87	Earl Mitchell Forrest II	White	66	M	May 11, 2016	Dent (Note: Was tried and convicted in Platte County.)	Lethal injection	Sharon Joann Barnes, Harriet Smith, and Michael Wells (Note: Barnes was a Dent County Sheriff's Deputy.)	Jay Nixon
88	Mark Anthony Christeson	White	37	M	January 31, 2017	Maries	Lethal injection	Susan Brouk, Adrian Brouk, and Kyle Brouk	Eric Greitens
89	Russell Earl Bucklew	White	51	M	October 1, 2019	Cape Girardeau (Note: Was tried and convicted in Boone County.)	Lethal injection	Michael Sanders	Mike Parson
90	Walter E. Barton	White	64	M	May 19, 2020	Christian	Lethal injection	Gladys Kuehler	Mike Parson
91	Ernest Lee Johnson	Black	61	M	October 5, 2021	Boone	Lethal injection	Mary Bratcher, Mabel Scruggs, and Fred Jones	Mike Parson
92	Carman Lee Deck Jr.	White	56	M	May 3, 2022	Jefferson	Lethal injection	James Long and Zelma Long	Mike Parson
93	Kevin Johnson Jr.	Black	37	M	November 29, 2022	St. Louis	Lethal injection	Kirkwood police Sergeant William Leo McEntee	Mike Parson
94	Amber McLaughlin	White	49	M (Note: Though identified as Scott A. McLaughlin in the death warrant and prison records, McLaughlin transitioned while incarcerated and identified as Amber McLaughlin at the time of execution, becoming the first transgender woman executed in the United States.)	January 3, 2023	St. Louis	Lethal injection	Beverly Guenther	Mike Parson
95	Leonard Sheldon Taylor	Black	58	M	February 7, 2023	St. Louis	Lethal injection	4 murder victims (Note: The 4 murder victims were: Angela Rowe, Alexus Conley, AcQreya Conley, and Tyrese Conley.)	Mike Parson
96	Michael Andrew Tisius	White	42	M	June 6, 2023	Randolph (Note: Was tried in Boone County. The jury that convicted him and issued their sentencing recommendation were from St. Charles County at his initial trial and from Greene County at his second retrial.)	Lethal injection	Jason Lee Acton and Leon Earl Egley (Note: Acton and Egley were Randolph County Jail Guards.)	Mike Parson
97	Johnny Allen Johnson	White	45	M	August 1, 2023	St. Louis	Lethal injection	Cassandra Lynn Williamson	Mike Parson
98	Brian Joseph Dorsey	White	52	M	April 9, 2024	Callaway (Note: Was tried and convicted in Boone County.)	Lethal injection	Benjamin Wade Bonnie and Sarah Ann Bonnie	Mike Parson
99	David Russell Hosier	White	69	M	June 11, 2024	Cole	Lethal injection	Angela Yvonne Gilpin and Rodney Dean Gilpin	Mike Parson
100	Marcellus Scott Williams	Black	55	M	September 24, 2024	St. Louis	Lethal injection	Felicia Anne Gayle	Mike Parson
101	Christopher Leroy Collings	White	49	M	December 3, 2024	Barry (Note: Was tried and convicted in Phelps County.)	Lethal injection	Rowan Damia Ford	Mike Parson
102	Lance Collin Shockley	White	48	M	October 14, 2025	Carter (Note: Was tried and convicted in Howell County.)	Lethal injection	MSHP trooper Sgt. Carl Dewayne Graham Jr.	Mike Kehoe

== Demographics ==
Race
White	63	61%
Black	38	38%
Native American	1	1%
Age
20–29	4	4%
30–39	28	28%
40–49	42	40%
50–59	20	20%
60–69	7	7%
70–79	1	1%
Sex
Male	102	100%
Date of execution
1976–1979	0	0%
1980–1989	1	1%
1990–1999	40	40%
2000–2009	26	26%
2010–2019	22	22%
2020–2029	13	11%
Method
Lethal injection	102	100%
Governor (Party)
Kit Bond (R)	0	0%
Joseph P. Teasdale (D)	0	0%
John Ashcroft (R)	7	7%
Mel Carnahan (D)	38	38%
Roger B. Wilson (D)	1	1%
Bob Holden (D)	15	15%
Matt Blunt (R)	5	5%
Jay Nixon (D)	21	21%
Eric Greitens (R)	1	1%
Mike Parson (R)	13	12%
Mike Kehoe (R)	1	1%
Total	102	100%

== See also ==
- Capital punishment in Missouri
- Capital punishment in the United States
- List of people executed in Missouri (pre-1972) – executions before Furman
