= Joseph Paul Franklin =

American serial killer (1950–2013)

- Missouri Department of Corrections mugshot c. 1980s
- Born: James Clayton Vaughn Jr. April 13, 1950; Mobile, Alabama, U.S.
- Died: November 20, 2013 (aged 63); Bonne Terre, Missouri, U.S.
- Status: Executed by lethal injection
- Motive: Desire to incite a race war
- Convictions: Utah; First degree murder (2 counts); Wisconsin; First degree murder (2 counts); Missouri; First degree murder Tennessee; First degree murder Ohio; Aggravated murder (2 counts)
- Penalty: Utah; Life imprisonment (March 23, 1981); Wisconsin; Life imprisonment (September 1986); Missouri; Death (February 27, 1997); Tennessee; Life imprisonment (March 4, 1998); Ohio; Life imprisonment (1998)

Details
- Victims: 8 convicted 22 total suspected 6+ wounded
- Span of crimes: August 7, 1977 – August 20, 1980
- Country: United States
- States: Missouri, Wisconsin, Tennessee, Georgia, Virginia, Indiana, Ohio, Oklahoma, Pennsylvania, West Virginia, Utah
- Date apprehended: October 28, 1980

Joseph Paul Franklin (born James Clayton Vaughn Jr.; April 13, 1950 – November 20, 2013) was an American serial killer and white supremacist who murdered sixteen people between 1978 and 1980. He either admitted to, or was convicted of, shooting 22 people across ten U.S. states, which he drifted between while likely supporting himself with money from bank robberies.

Franklin's victims were generally black male–white female interracial couples and Jews. He took interest in white supremacism in his youth, which he later claimed was due to suffering child abuse. He then joined the National Socialist White People's Party (NSWPP) and the Ku Klux Klan, and became acquainted with white supremacist David Duke.

In 1977, Franklin firebombed a synagogue in Tennessee, which caused no injuries. In 1978, he shot Larry Flynt, a white man who headed pornographic magazine Hustler, in response to Hustler recently depicting interracial sex. Flynt survived, while his lower body became permanently paralyzed. In May 1980, Franklin shot black civil rights activist Vernon Jordan, who also survived. Franklin was arrested that October.

He was convicted of several murders, receiving seven life sentences and one death sentence. He admitted to many other murders while in prison, but was not convicted for all of them. In 1997, he admitted to two murders that a man named Jacob Beard had been imprisoned for since 1993; Beard was later released. Franklin was on death row in Missouri for 15 years over the 1977 murder of Gerald Gordon. In November 2013, Franklin renounced his former racism. He was executed by lethal injection later that month.

== Early life ==
Joseph Paul Franklin was born as James Clayton Vaughn Jr. in Mobile, Alabama, on April 13, 1950, the elder son of James Clayton Vaughn Sr. and Helen Rau Vaughn. Franklin had two sisters and a brother. His father was a World War II veteran and butcher who left the family when Franklin was 8 years old. Helen had Vaughn Sr. jailed twice for public drunkenness. Franklin later stated that as a child, he was rarely given enough to eat, suffered severe physical abuse, and that his mother "didn't care about [him and his siblings]". He claimed that these factors stunted his emotional development, and that he had "always been [at] least ten years or more behind other people in their maturity." His sister Carolyn recalled, "Whenever [Vaughn Sr.] came to visit, he'd beat us". A family friend said Helen was a "a real strict, perfectionist lady", whose children said she had beaten them.

As early as high school, Franklin developed an interest in evangelical Christianity, then in Nazism. He later held memberships in two white supremacist groups, the National Socialist White People's Party—also known by its earlier name, the American Nazi Party—and the Ku Klux Klan. He eventually changed his name to "Joseph Paul Franklin", in honor of two white men: Benjamin Franklin and Nazi Party official Paul Joseph Goebbels.

Franklin was inspired to start a race war after reading Adolf Hitler's 1925 autobiography Mein Kampf. Franklin later recalled: "I've never felt that way about any other book that I read [...] it was something weird about that book." In the early 1970s, he took a road trip with white supremacists David Duke and Don Black to an NSWPP conference in Virginia. A photograph from September 1970 shows Franklin wearing a Nazi uniform in front of the White House in Washington, D.C., to protest a diplomatic visit by Israel's prime minister, Golda Meir.

== Crimes ==
For much of his life, Franklin was a vagrant, roaming the East Coast seeking chances to "cleanse the world" of people he considered inferior, especially black and Jewish people. His primary source of financial support was likely bank robberies. Franklin supplemented his income from criminal acts with paid blood bank donations, which eventually led to his capture by the FBI.

=== 1977 ===
On July 29, 1977, Franklin firebombed Beth Shalom Synagogue in Chattanooga, Tennessee, destroying it. No one was injured, as some of the worshippers left early that evening.

On August 7, he shot and killed an interracial couple, Alphonse Manning and Toni Schwenn, both aged 23, at the parking lot of East Towne Mall in Madison, Wisconsin. He was later convicted of both murders and was sentenced to life in prison.

On October 8, in suburban St. Louis, Missouri, Franklin hid in the bushes near Shaare Zedek Synagogue and fired on a group attending services. He killed Gerald Gordon (age 42), and wounded Steven Goldman and William Ash.

=== 1978 ===
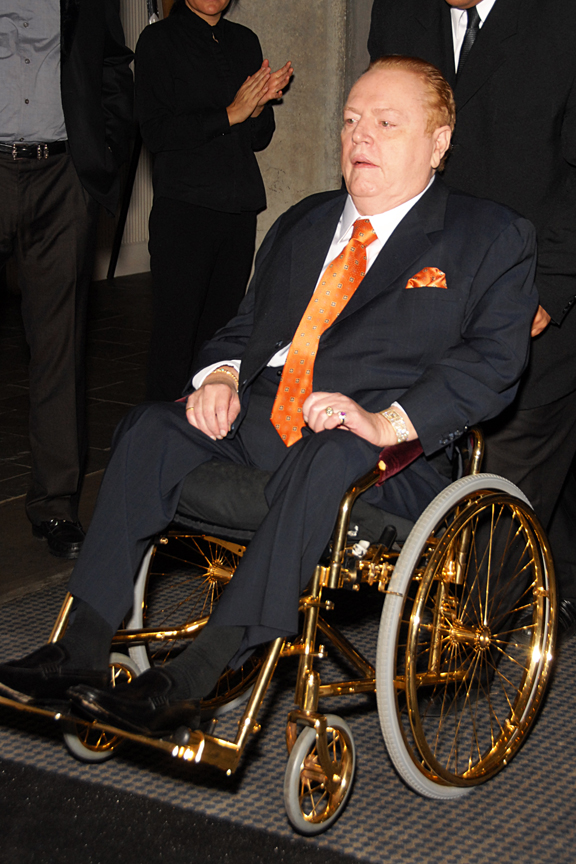
Larry Flynt, after he was shot by Franklin in Lawrenceville, Georgia

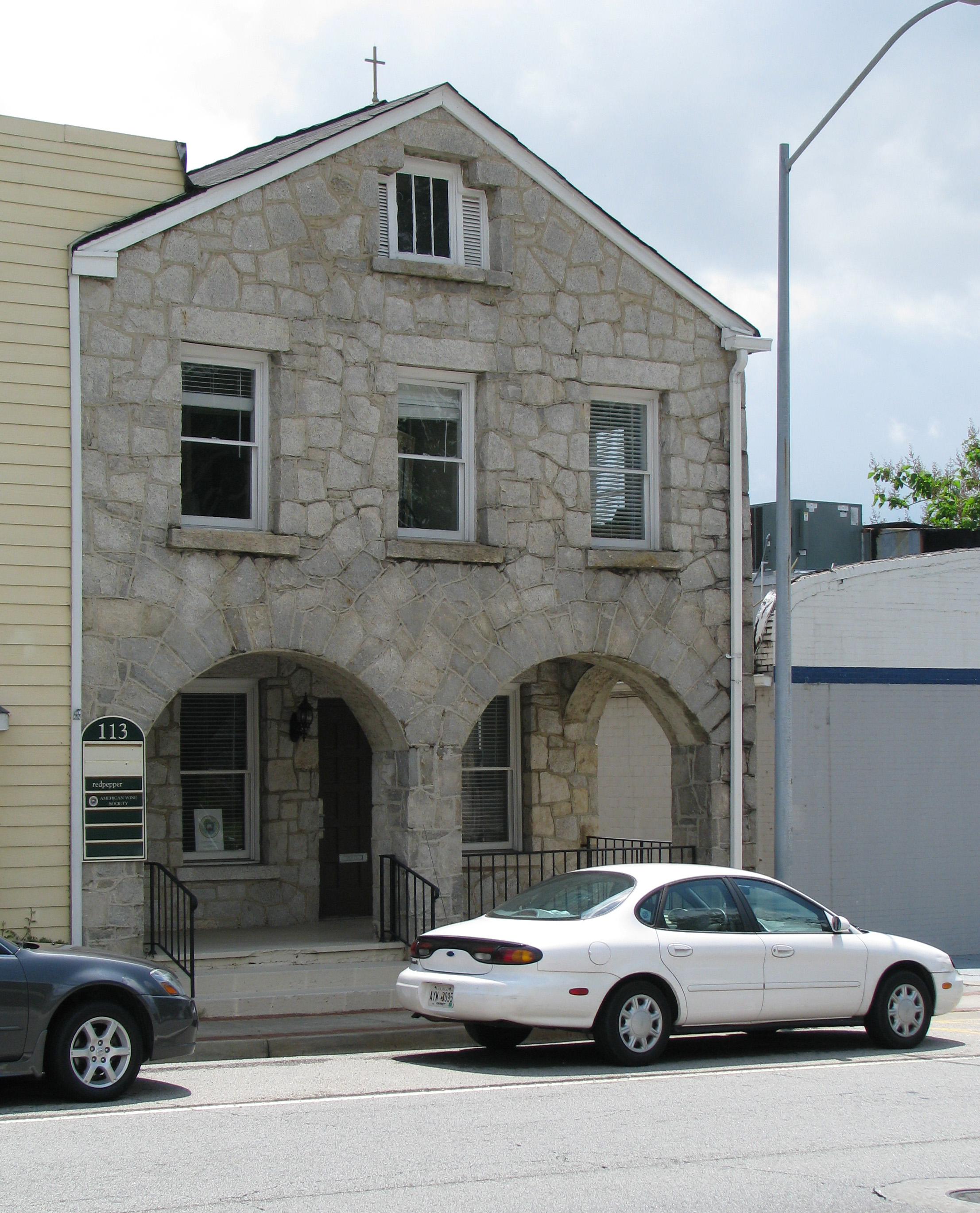
Franklin shot from 113 Perry Street, at the door behind the central pillar

On March 6, 1978, Franklin used a Ruger Model 44 semi-automatic rifle to shoot Hustler publisher Larry Flynt and his lawyer Gene Reeves in Lawrenceville, Georgia. Franklin said this was in retaliation for Hustler publishing a picture of interracial sex. Flynt's spinal cord was damaged, causing his lower body to be permanently paralyzed. Neither Franklin nor anyone else was ever charged for the shooting.

On July 29, Franklin hid near a Pizza Hut in Chattanooga, and fatally shot William Tatum (20), a black man, with a 12-gauge shotgun. He also shot Tatum's white girlfriend, Nancy Hilton, and she survived. Franklin later confessed and pleaded guilty. He was given a life sentence, as well as a sentence for an unrelated armed robbery in 1977.

=== 1979 ===
On July 12, 1979, Harold McIver (29), a black man and a manager of a Taco Bell location, was fatally shot through a window from 150 yards (140 m) away in Doraville, Georgia. Franklin confessed to the crime, but was not tried or sentenced for it. He said that he murdered McIver for being in close contact to white women.

On August 18, Raymond Turner, often erroneously referred to as Raymond Taylor a black man in Falls Church, Virginia was fatally shot through the window of a Burger King he managed there. Franklin later confessed to killing him. Turner's father, Jack, had been a civil rights activist, and one of the first black men elected to office in Loudoun County, Virginia, although Franklin is not understood to have been aware of this.

On October 21, Franklin killed Jesse Taylor (42), a black man, and his white girlfriend, Marion Bresette (31), in Oklahoma City, Oklahoma.

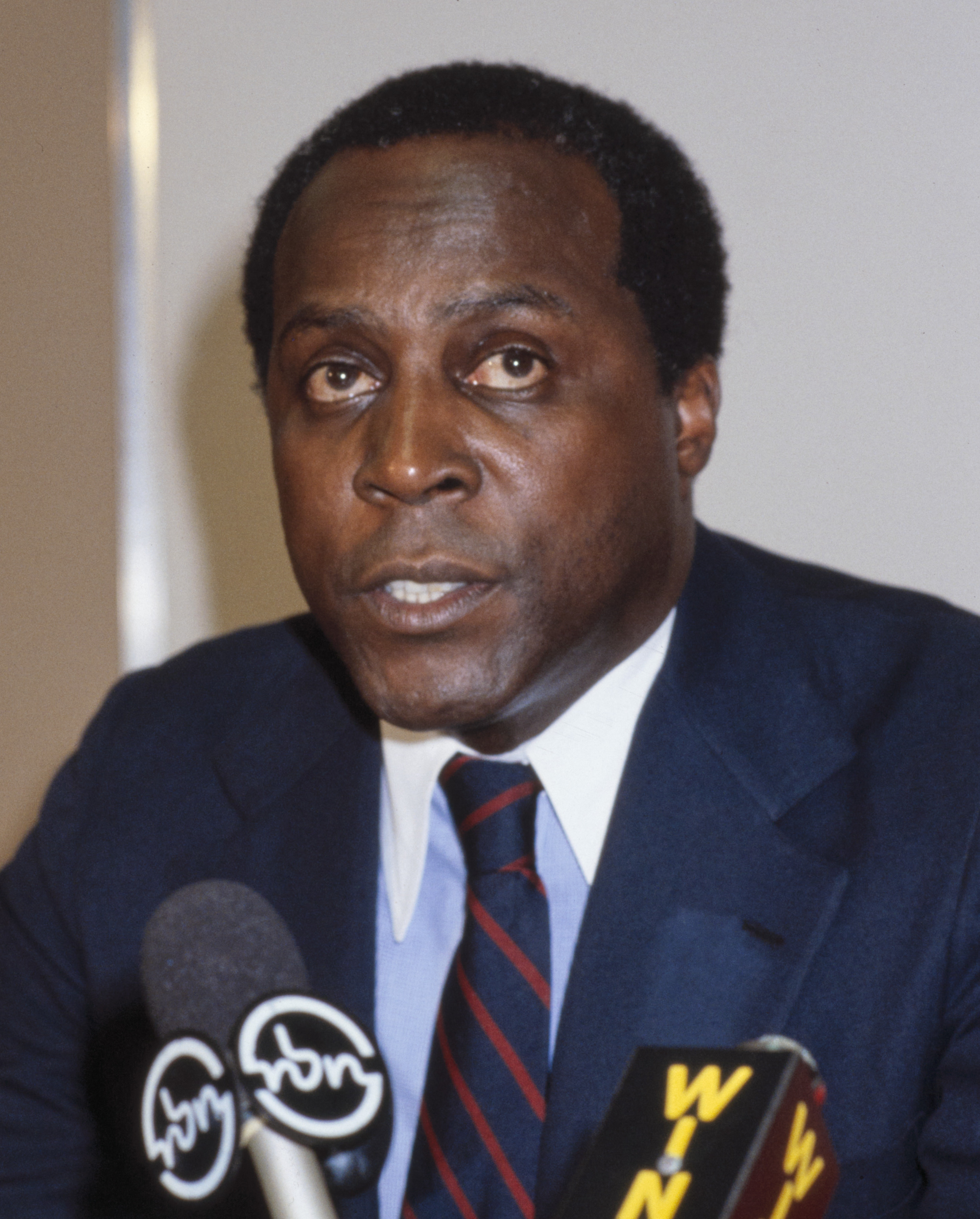
Vernon Jordan in 1973

=== 1980 ===
On May 29, 1980, Franklin shot civil rights activist and Urban League president Vernon Jordan after seeing him with a white woman in Fort Wayne, Indiana. Jordan was seriously wounded, but ultimately survived. Franklin initially denied any part in the shooting, and was acquitted of it, but later confessed to it. (Note: Then-U.S. president Jimmy Carter's visit to Jordan in the hospital was the first story ever covered by CNN.)

On June 8, Franklin killed cousins Darrell Lane (14) and Dante Brown (13) in Cincinnati, Ohio. Waiting on an overpass to shoot a racially mixed couple, he shot the boys instead, a crime to which he later confessed. He was convicted in 1998 and received two life sentences for these murders.

On June 15, Franklin shot and killed Arthur Smothers (22), a black man, and Kathleen Mikula (16), a white girl, with a high-powered rifle as they walked across the Washington Street Bridge in Johnstown, Pennsylvania. Franklin had taken a concealed position on a wooded hillside overlooking downtown Johnstown, and waited for potential targets to enter his line of sight. He was never arrested for these murders, but confessed to them in jail.

On June 25, Franklin used a .44 Ruger pistol to kill two white women and hitchhikers, Nancy Santomero (19) and Victoria Durian (26), in Pocahontas County, West Virginia. He confessed to the crime in 1997 to an Ohio assistant prosecutor investigating another case. Franklin said he picked up the women and decided to kill them after one said she had a black boyfriend. A Florida man named Jacob Beard had been convicted and imprisoned in 1993 for the murders; he was freed in 1999, and a new trial was ordered based on Franklin's confession. On May 31, 2000, a jury found Beard not guilty, and he later filed a lawsuit, wanting compensation for wrongful conviction, which led to a $2 million settlement.

On August 20, Franklin killed two black men, Theodore Fields (20) and David Martin III (18) near Liberty Park located in Salt Lake City, Utah. He was tried on federal civil rights charges as well as state first-degree murder charges. He was convicted of both murders and was sentenced to life in prison.

== Apprehension, conviction, and imprisonment ==
Following the two murders in Utah, Franklin returned to the Midwest. Traveling through Kentucky, he was detained and questioned regarding a firearm that was in his car. Franklin fled from the interrogators. Authorities then recovered sufficient evidence from his vehicle to potentially link him to the sniper killings. His conspicuous racist tattoos, coupled with his habit of visiting blood banks, led investigators to issue a nationwide alert to blood banks. In October 1980, the tattoos drew the attention of a Florida blood bank worker, who contacted the FBI. Franklin was arrested in Lakeland, Florida, on October 28.

Franklin faced legal action across the U.S. for the next two decades, eventually being convicted of multiple murders, attacks, and other crimes at both the state and federal levels. He was sentenced to life in prison and received the death penalty in Missouri for murdering Gerald Gordon.

Franklin tried unsuccessfully to escape during the judgment phase of his 1997 Missouri trial on charges of murdering Gordon but was ultimately convicted. Psychiatrist Dorothy Otnow Lewis, who had interviewed him at length, testified for the defense that she believed that Franklin was a paranoid schizophrenic and unfit to stand trial, noting Franklin's delusional thinking and a childhood history of severe abuse.

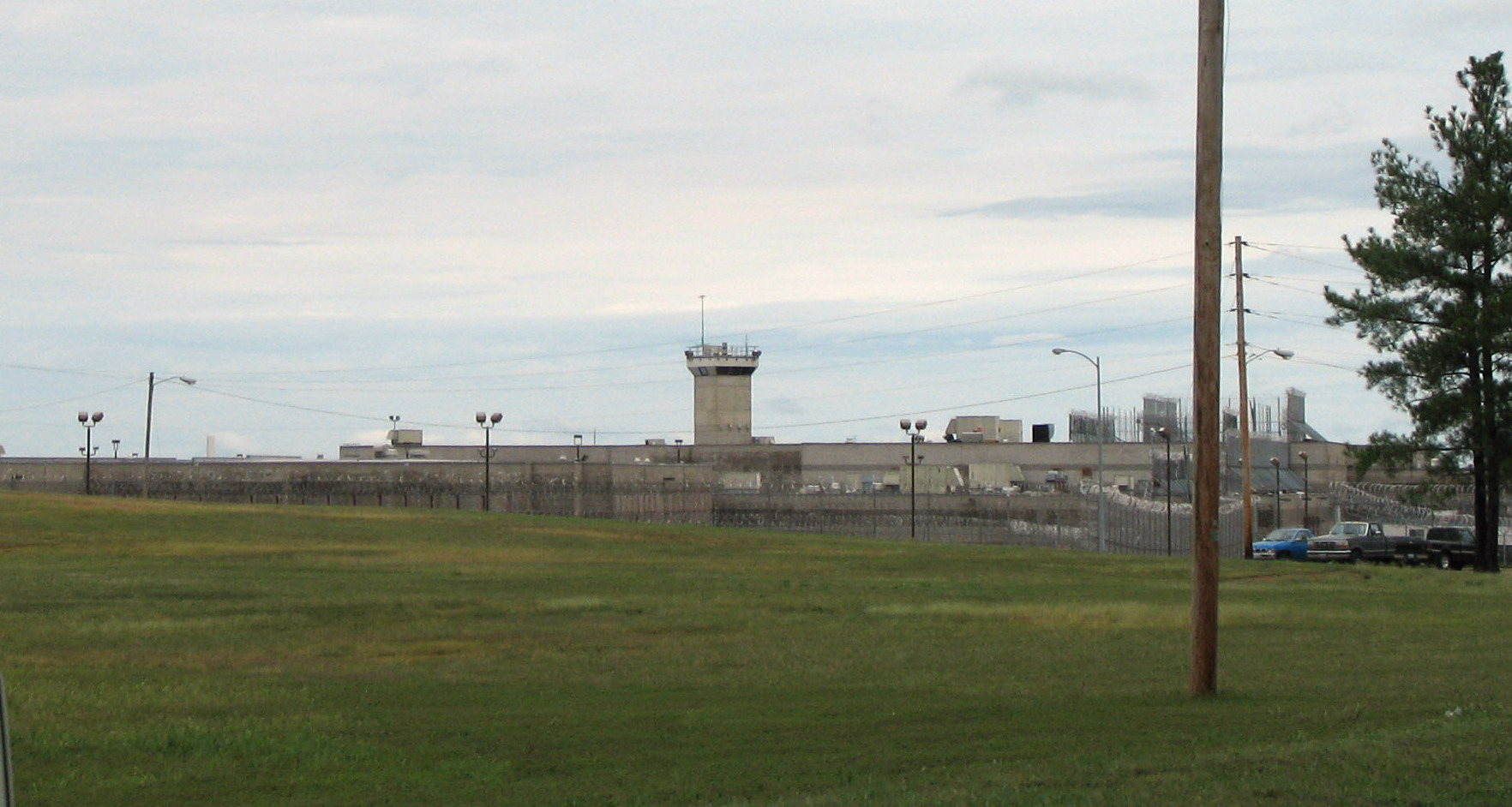
Potosi Correctional Center in Missouri

Franklin was held on death row at the Potosi Correctional Center near Mineral Point, Missouri. In August 2013, the Missouri Supreme Court announced that Franklin would be executed on November 20. Missouri Attorney General Chris Koster said in a statement that by setting execution dates, the state high court "has taken an important step to see that justice is finally done for the victims and their families." In October, Larry Flynt called for clemency for Franklin, asserting "that a government that forbids killing among its citizens should not be in the business of killing people itself."

== Execution ==
Franklin's execution was affected by the European Union export ban when the German drug manufacturer Fresenius Kabi was obliged to refuse having their drugs used for lethal injections. In response, Missouri announced that it would use for Franklin's execution a new method of lethal injection, which used a single drug provided by an unnamed compounding pharmacy.

In an interview with the St. Louis Post-Dispatch newspaper published on November 17, 2013, Franklin said he had renounced his racist views. He said his motivation had been "illogical" and was partly a consequence of an abusive upbringing. He said he had interacted with black people in prison, adding: "I saw they were people just like us."

On November 19, a U.S. District Judge in Jefferson City, Missouri, Nanette Laughrey, granted a stay of execution over concerns raised about the new method of execution. A second stay was granted that evening by a U.S. District Judge in St. Louis, Carol E. Jackson, based on Franklin's claim that he was too mentally incompetent to be executed. An appeals court quickly overturned both stays, and the U.S. Supreme Court subsequently rejected his final appeals.

Franklin was executed at the Eastern Reception, Diagnostic and Correctional Center in Bonne Terre, Missouri, on November 20. The execution began at 6:07 a.m. CST and he was pronounced dead at 6:17. His execution was the first lethal injection in Missouri to use pentobarbital alone instead of the conventional use of three drugs. 5 grams (0.18 oz) of pentobarbital was administered. He did not make any final written statement and did not speak a word in the death chamber. Three witnesses said Franklin did not seem to show pain; after the injection, he had blinked a few times, breathed and swallowed hard, then stopped moving.

== Media depictions ==
William Luther Pierce, founder of the white supremacist group National Alliance, dedicated his 1989 novel Hunter to Franklin. It revolves around a serial killer who murders interracial couples. He once said that Franklin "saw his duty as a white man and did what a responsible son of his race must do."

In the 1996 film The People vs. Larry Flynt, Franklin was portrayed by actor Jan Tříska.

== See also ==
- Neal Long, another serial killer motivated by racism
- Joseph Christopher, American serial killer who targeted African American men and boys
- List of people executed in Missouri
- List of people executed in the United States in 2013
- List of serial killers by number of victims
- List of serial killers in the United States

== Notes ==
Executions carried out in Missouri
Preceded by Martin C. Link February 9, 2011	Joseph Paul Franklin; November 20, 2013	Succeeded by Allen L. Niklasson December 11, 2013
Executions carried out in the United States
Preceded by Jamie Bruce McCoskey – Texas November 12, 2013	Joseph Paul Franklin – Missouri; November 20, 2013	Succeeded by Jerry Duane Martin – Texas December 3, 2013
