= Dennis Skillicorn =

Executed American serial killer

- Born: Dennis James Skillicorn; November 21, 1959; Kansas City, Missouri, U.S.
- Died: May 20, 2009 (aged 49); Eastern Reception, Diagnostic and Correctional Center, Bonne Terre, Missouri, U.S.
- Cause of death: Execution by lethal injection
- Convictions: Missouri; First degree murder Second degree murder Arizona; First degree murder (2 counts)
- Penalty: Missouri; 35 years imprisonment (1979); Death (1994); Arizona; Life imprisonment

Details
- Victims: 5–6
- Span of crimes: 1979–1994
- Country: United States, possibly Mexico
- States: Missouri, Arizona, Nevada (possibly Baja California)
- Date apprehended: For the final time on October 6, 1994

Dennis James Skillicorn (November 21, 1959 – May 20, 2009) was an American criminal and serial killer. Originally sentenced to 35 years imprisonment for a 1979 second degree murder charge, he was later paroled and, with the help of two accomplices, embarked on a crime spree that resulted in the deaths of at least four more people. Convicted and sentenced to death for one of these murders, he and one of his accomplices were executed in 2009 and 2013, respectively.

== Murders ==
=== First murder ===
On December 2, 1979, the 20-year-old Skillicorn accompanied two other men – 28-year-old James K. Betts and 21-year-old Elias Frank Brooks Jr. – on an out-of-town trip to buy drugs. In desperate need of cash, they decided to rob somebody, setting their sights on a rural farmhouse in Levasy. The trio broke in and forced the occupant, 81-year-old Wendell Howell, to stay on the couch while Brooks and Skillicorn stole his TV set. When they did so, Betts proceeded to shoot him in the back of the head with a sawed-off shotgun.

Shortly after fleeing the crime scene, the criminals were stopped by a policeman in Buckner for a routine vehicle inspection, and despite the fact that he found it odd that they had a TV in the back seat, he let them go. Later on, when the officer learned that a homicide had recently been committed in the area, he contacted law enforcement about the traffic stop and identified the trio when he was presented with their photographs. As a result, Betts, Brooks, and Skillicorn were all arrested and charged with the robbery-murder of Wendell Howell. For his part in the crime, Skillicorn testified against Betts and was eventually convicted of second-degree murder, for which he was given 35 years imprisonment with a chance of parole.

=== Crime spree and manhunt ===
After serving 13.5 years of his sentence, Skillicorn was paroled in November 1992 and returned to live in Kansas City, but was required to enroll himself into a drug rehabilitation center run by The Salvation Army. During his time there, he befriended a man named Allen L. Nicklasson, a 22-year-old violent felon and fellow drug addict. In late August 1994, the pair, accompanied by 17-year-old Tim DeGraffenreid, decided to go buy drugs together after leaving the rehabilitation center and got in DeGraffenreid's 1983 Chevrolet Caprice, whereupon they headed towards St. Louis.

Along the way, their car broke down near Kingdom City, and after having trouble starting it for a day, they broke into a nearby house to steal money and guns. They then paid to have the car fixed, but it had too many issues and eventually broke down again near Kingdom City on August 24. While they were attempting to fix it, the trio were approached by 47-year-old Richard Drummond, a supervisor for AT&T from Excelsior Springs, who offered to help them out. Nicklasson held him at gunpoint and ordered him to get back into his car, after which all four men drove away in his 1994 Dodge Intrepid. Along the way, Skillicorn and Nicklasson decided to get rid of Drummond, driving to a field near Higginsville, where Nicklasson shot Drummond in the back of the head. The trio then attended a party in Blue Springs. DeGraffenreid left them at that point and went into hiding while Skillicorn and Nicklasson pressed on.

From there, the pair drove southwest, finding themselves in Kingman, Arizona two days later. After getting their car stuck, Skillicorn and Nicklasson knocked on the door of the nearest house, occupied by Joseph and Charlene Babcock. Explaining their situation, Joseph agreed to help them and drove the two men back to their car in his own 1989 Dodge Ramcharger. Once they arrived, he was shot dead, but as they were unwilling to leave any potential witnesses, Skillicorn and Nicklasson got into Joseph's car and drove back to his house, burst inside, and knocked Charlene to the ground. They then shot her in the head, ransacked a nearby house for ammunition, and fled in the Babcocks' car. Later in the evening, a man resembling Skillicorn attempted to snatch a woman's purse in Huntington Beach, California, and when confronted by her and another passer-by, he opened fire on them. The victims were unharmed, but the assailant jumped into his car – a Ramcharger with Arizona license plates – and sped away from the scene.

They were then traced to Battle Mountain, Nevada, where a man resembling Skillicorn was seen on August 31. The day after, a Ramcharger was seen speeding away from the area of which was later discovered to be a murder scene – the victim was a trucker from Missouri named Paul James Hines, who had been transporting candy bars across the I-80. Like the pair's previous victims, he had been shot to death. By this time, Skillicorn and Nicklasson were sought after by several states and the FBI, as DeGraffenreid (who had been arrested by then) had revealed the location of Drummond's body and implicated them as the main killers. As authorities no clue as to their whereabouts after this, people across the southwestern United States were warned to be wary of helping anybody asking for help on highways.

== Capture, trial, and imprisonment ==
After spending the remainder of September in hiding, including at least ten days in Mexico, Skillicorn and Nicklasson eventually ran out of money. They then drove to San Diego, where they turned to hitchhiking along interstate ramps. On October 5, while hitchhiking with another man, Nicklasson was arrested by a police officer and transported to the county jail – however, Skillicorn was not recognized at the time and was let go along with the man accompanying them. His freedom did not last long, as he was re-arrested by California Highway Patrol officers on the following day. Following brief interrogations, both men reportedly confessed to killing Drummond and the Babcocks. As it was expected that both of them were likely to face the death penalty, a federal carjacking charge was dropped, allowing extradition proceedings back to Kansas City to continue. In response to the initial failure to arrest Skillicorn, a hearing was held at the United States Senate Committee on Governmental Affairs to discuss what measures should be taken to expand criminal background checks.

Due to the publicity around the murders, especially surrounding the Drummond case, it was decided that the three defendants would be tried in three separate trials with jurors selected from three counties. For unclear reasons, Nicklasson's initial trial was delayed for five months. At his own trial, prosecutors contended that Skillicorn was an active participant in Drummond's murder and was as guilty as Nicklasson, while his attorney claimed that his client had attempted to convince Nicklasson to just abandon him in the forest. During the proceedings, multiple witnesses were called, including Drummond's wife Kathy and Nicklasson's girlfriend, all of whom testified against Skillicorn.

Near the end of the trial, prosecutors presented an audiotape containing oral confessions from Skillicorn detailing all of their crimes, including a supposed additional murder of a restaurant employee in Tecate, Mexico that was never verified. In the end, he was found guilty on all counts, with the jury recommending a death sentence. In March 1996, Skillicorn was officially sentenced to death. He was later convicted of the Babcocks' murders and sentenced to life imprisonment.

== Execution ==
Over the years, despite protests from anti-death penalty activists due to his good conduct and attempts on Nicklasson's part to have his sentence overturned, all of Skillicorn's appeals were denied. On May 20, 2009, he was executed via lethal injection at the Eastern Reception, Diagnostic and Correctional Center in Bonne Terre. He was the first person to be executed in the state following a three-year moratorium on executions.

Nicklasson was executed for his role in the crime on December 11, 2013. He made no final statement, and spent the last twenty minutes of his life praying with the prison chaplain. Neither his family members nor those of the victim attended the execution. DeGraffenreid, who pleaded guilty to the murder charges, was given a life term which he is serving in another state.

== See also ==
- Capital punishment in Missouri
- List of people executed by lethal injection
- List of people executed in Missouri
- List of people executed in the United States in 2009
- List of people executed in the United States in 2013

Executions carried out in Missouri
Preceded by Marlin Andrew Gray October 26, 2005	Dennis Skillicorn; May 20, 2009	Succeeded by Martin C. Link February 9, 2011
Executions carried out in the United States
Preceded by Michael Lynn Riley – Texas May 19, 2009	Dennis Skillicorn – Missouri; May 20, 2009	Succeeded by Terry Lee Hankins – Texas June 2, 2009
Executions carried out in Missouri
Preceded by Joseph Paul Franklin November 20, 2013	Allen L. Nicklasson; December 11, 2013	Succeeded by Herbert L. Smulls January 29, 2014
Executions carried out in the United States
Preceded by Ronald Clinton Lott – Oklahoma December 10, 2013	Allen L. Nicklasson – Missouri; December 11, 2013	Succeeded by Johnny Dale Black – Oklahoma December 17, 2013
