= Samuel Lee Smithers =

Executed American convicted murderer (1953–2025)

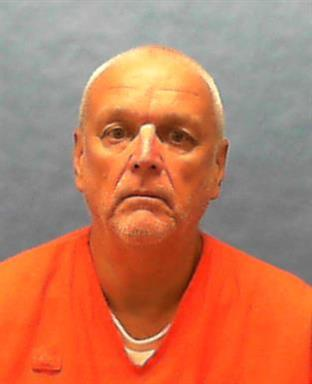
- Mugshot of Smithers
- Born: January 30, 1953; Tennessee, U.S.
- Died: October 14, 2025 (aged 72); Florida State Prison, Florida, U.S.
- Status: Executed by lethal injection
- Conviction: First degree murder (2 counts)
- Penalty: Death

Details
- Victims: 2–3
- Date: 1989 (suspected) – 1996
- Country: United States
- State: Florida
- Location: Hillsborough County, Florida
- Imprisoned at: Florida State Prison

Samuel Lee Smithers (January 30, 1953 – October 14, 2025), dubbed the Deacon of Death, was an American convicted murderer and suspected serial killer who was sentenced to death in Florida for the 1996 murders of two women. Smithers murdered prostitute Denise Roach on May 12, 1996, after he engaged her services at a local Tampa motel and later disposed of her body in a pond. Sixteen days later on May 28, 1996, he killed sex worker Christy Cowan, and later dumped her body in the same pond where Roach's corpse was found after his arrest. Smithers, who was named a suspect in a 1989 unsolved killing, was found guilty of first-degree murder on both counts and sentenced to death, and he was executed by lethal injection on October 14, 2025.

== Early and adult life ==
Samuel Lee Smithers was born on January 30, 1953, and grew up in Tennessee. Family members described a rough childhood for him, claiming that he was dropped on his head as a baby and hit over the head with a shotgun by a robber. According to court testimony by one of his brothers, Smithers' father was physically abusive to his mother. He also claimed that his mother was a religious woman who whipped her children in exorcism-type rituals.

Smithers completed high school in June 1971, and he went to Chattanooga Technical School for his junior college education up until 1973. Between 1973 and 1979, Smithers' married his wife Sharon, had a son with her, and became Deacon and custodian at the First Baptist Church in Plant City. A year before the murders, however, Smithers resigned after being accused of plotting to lie about a woman's community service in exchange for sexual favors.

At age 27, Smithers committed arson on a church in two separate incidents. In the first, he lit a church on fire with kerosene and was arrested with two other suspects. In the second incident, he started another fire in the classroom area of the same church. He later claimed to authorities that the excitement from committing the arson had given him an erection. In another incident, Smithers set a woman's car on fire before knocking on her door and informing her that her car was ablaze. He had a fire extinguisher with him. After being arrested, he confessed to all three fires, stating that he was unsure of his motive but he felt like a hero.

== Murders ==
In separate cases in May 1996, Smithers killed two women in Hillsborough County, Florida.

=== Denise Roach ===
The first was Denise Elaine Roach, a 24-year-old Jamaican-born prostitute. On May 12, 1996, Smithers encountered Roach at a motel in Tampa and hired her for sexual services. After, Smithers brought Roach to a rural property in Plant City owned by an acquaintance. There, he assaulted Roach, strangled her to death, and disposed of her body in a nearby pond. Roach left behind two children, and had past criminal records for drug abuse.

In his statement to police, Smithers claimed he killed Roach accidentally. According to Smithers, a fight had broken out between them after he found her trespassing on the property where the murder occurred. During the fight, Smithers claimed to have shoved Roach against a wall, causing a loose piece of wood to fall from a shelf and fatally strike her on the head.

=== Christy Cowan ===
Smithers' second victim was 31-year-old prostitute and aspiring nurse Christy Elizabeth Cowan. On May 28, 1996, Smithers met Cowan at a motel and paid her for sex. As with Roach, Smithers then took her to the property in Plant City, assaulted her there, including with an axe, lethally strangled her and disposed of her body in the same pond. Like Roach, Cowan left behind two children and had past criminal records for drug consumption.

Smithers claimed to police that he encountered Cowan by the side of the road where her car had broken down, and drove her to a nearby convenience store. There, Smithers claimed that Cowan attempted to rob him by threatening to falsely accuse him of rape. According to Smithers' account, an altercation subsequently ensued, during which he non-fatally struck her with the axe and left her—unconscious but alive—by the side of the pond.

== Arrest and charges ==
On May 28, 1996, the day he murdered Christy Cowan, Marian Whitehurst, the owner of the property where Smithers killed the women, happened to drop by unexpectedly and saw Smithers cleaning an axe and a pool of blood in the carport. When Whitehurst probed Smithers about the blood, Smithers claimed the blood was from an animal. Whitehurst remained unsettled and later in the evening called the police to report what she saw. Although the pool of blood was cleaned up, the police found drag marks in the grass leading to a pond in which they found Cowan's body. A further search in the pond led to the discovery of a second woman's corpse, later identified as that of Denise Roach.

Autopsy found that Cowan sustained multiple head wounds and skull fractures, and other injuries consistent with manual strangulation and drowning. Roach died as a result of more than ten stab wounds to her head, along with strangulation.

Samuel Smithers was arrested and charged with the murders of Cowan and Denise Roach the next day, on May 29. This was not Smithers's first brush with the law, as he was previously convicted of starting church fires thrice in Tennessee in 1980 during his former occupation as a volunteer firefighter.

On June 15, Smithers officially pleaded not guilty to the murders. The prosecution announced on July 4 that it would seek the death penalty against Smithers.

== Trial ==
On December 14, 1998, Smithers officially went to trial for the murders of Denise Roach and Christy Cowan.

During the trial, Smithers changed his statement and denied that he killed the two women. He claimed that someone else killed the women as part of an elaborate drug and blackmail scheme. Smithers testified that an unnamed man threatened to show his wife a photo of Smithers with another woman unless he agreed to use the property for illegal drug deals, and paid Smithers to help with the drug transactions. Smithers claimed he witnessed the same man fatally strike Roach with a hatchet, and he was forced to dispose of the body. Likewise, Smithers said that Cowan was killed by another person who ordered him to dispose of the body. However, Smithers's defense was not supported by objective evidence.

On December 19, 1998, Smithers was found guilty of two counts of first-degree murder by a Hillsborough County jury. The sentencing trial of Smithers was scheduled to begin in January 1999.

During the sentencing phase of Smithers's trial, the defense attempted to show that Smithers had a troubled childhood caused by alleged physical abuse inflicted by his parents, and that he was a victim of childhood abuse, religious repression, mental illness, and brain damage. Smithers's ex-wife, with whom he had a son, stated that throughout her 23-year marriage with Smithers, he was a good father and spouse and she could not believe that he would commit such brutal murders.

On January 25, 1999, the jury unanimously voted for Smithers to receive the death penalty for both killings. Before sentencing, Cowan's father stated that he did not wish to see Smithers get the death penalty and hoped that he would spend the rest of his life in prison, and used his imprisonment to repent and help other inmates reform.

On June 25, 1999, Smithers was sentenced to death by Circuit Judge William Fuente for the murders of Cowan and Roach, whose deaths were cited to be "extremely torturous" by the judge during sentencing.

As of May 2019, Smithers was one of Florida's 19 prisoners held on death row for murders that took place within Hillsborough County.

== Death row and execution ==
=== Link to 1989 unsolved murder ===
In 2014, 18 years after Samuel Smithers killed Denise Roach and Christy Cowan, police investigators uncovered that Smithers was likely the culprit behind the 1989 unsolved murder of Marcelle Delano. Delano, who was also working as a prostitute, was found murdered on November 27, 1989, and her body was located not far from where Smithers disposed of the corpses of Cowan and Roach. Due to the case's similar characteristics as that of Cowan and Roach's murder, Smithers was ultimately named the prime suspect in the case, even though he denied any involvement in Delano's death.

=== Appeals ===
Smithers appealed his death sentence to the Florida Supreme Court twice. His first attempt was on May 16, 2002 and was rejected. The second, on July 9, 2009, was dismissed. His appeal for post-conviction relief on March 29, 2018 was similarly denied.

=== Lethal injection execution ===
On September 13, 2025, Florida Governor Ron DeSantis signed a death warrant for Smithers, whose death sentence was scheduled to be carried out on October 14, 2025.

In a final bid to commute Smithers's death sentence, Smithers's lawyers filed an appeal to the courts of Florida, submitting that their client was too old to be executed at the age of 72, and this would amount to "cruel and unusual punishment". However, Hillsborough County Circuit Judge Michelle Sisco rejected the appeal on September 26, 2025. Subsequently, on October 8, 2025, the Florida Supreme Court rejected the appeal on the grounds that no precedent cases had specifically held that the elderly are categorically exempt from execution. A final appeal was later lodged to the U.S. Supreme Court and was denied hours before the execution was carried out.

Smithers was put to death by lethal injection at the Florida State Prison on October 14, 2025, at 6:15 pm. Prior to his execution, Smithers ate a last meal of fried chicken, fried fish, a baked potato, apple pie with vanilla ice cream and a sweet tea.

Smithers was one of seven inmates scheduled to be executed in October 2025 across the United States. Smithers was also one of four inmates slated to be executed within the same week; one of them, Missouri prisoner and convicted cop killer Lance Shockley, received the same execution date as Smithers. Both Smithers and Shockley were executed an hour apart from each other.

Floridians for Alternatives to the Death Penalty (FADP), an anti-death penalty group, condemned the execution, stating that Smithers was an elderly man with continued cognitive decline during his incarceration on death row and the death penalty would not provide closure to the victims' families; however, Governor Ron DeSantis supported the execution, emphasising that Smithers was an "axe murderer" who murdered two innocent women in cold blood and his conduct deserved the death penalty.

Smithers was also the first white person to be executed for killing a black person in the United States since the 2019 execution of John William King, and only the second in the state of Florida, after Mark Asay, since capital punishment first began in the state in 1769. One of Smithers's victims (Roach) was black, while the other (Cowan) was white.

At the time of his execution, Smithers became one of the two oldest prisoners to be executed in the history of Florida since 1924, at the age of 72; the other was R. Charlie Gifford, who was found guilty of the 1950 assassination of state lawmaker Charles Schuh Jr. and executed at age 72 on February 21, 1951. This record was surpassed when 74-year-old Dusty Ray Spencer was executed on June 25, 2026, for the 1992 murder of his wife Karen Spencer.

== Aftermath ==
In 2016, true crime writer Fred Rosen penned a book titled Deacon of Death: Sam Smithers, the Serial Killer Next Door, which was based on the life and crimes of Smithers.

== See also ==
- Capital punishment in Florida
- List of people executed in Florida
- List of people executed in the United States in 2025
- List of white defendants executed for killing a black victim

Executions carried out in Florida
Preceded by Victor Tony Jones September 30, 2025	Samuel Lee Smithers; October 14, 2025	Succeeded by Norman Mearle Grim Jr. October 28, 2025
Executions carried out in the United States
Preceded by Roy Lee Ward – Indiana October 10, 2025	Samuel Lee Smithers – Florida; October 14, 2025	Succeeded by Lance Collin Shockley – Missouri October 14, 2025
White defendants executed for killing a black victim in the United States
Preceded by John William King – Texas April 24, 2019	Samuel Lee Smithers – Florida; October 14, 2025	Succeeded by most recent
