= Ernest Lee Johnson =

American criminal (1960–2021)

- Johnson, undated (c. 2014–2021)
- Born: August 20, 1960; Steele, Missouri, U.S.
- Died: October 5, 2021 (aged 61); Eastern Reception, Diagnostic and Correctional Center, Bonne Terre, Missouri, U.S.
- Cause of death: Execution by lethal injection
- Motive: To obtain money for drugs
- Convictions: First degree murder (3 counts); Second degree robbery Burglary; Second degree burglary Attempted second degree burglary Auto theft
- Penalty: Death

Details
- Victims: Mary Bratcher, 46; Mable Scruggs, 57; Fred Jones, 58
- Date: February 12, 1994
- Country: United States
- Location: Boone County, Missouri
- Weapons: Gun; Hammer; Screwdriver

Ernest Lee Johnson (August 20, 1960 – October 5, 2021) was an American criminal convicted and executed for the murder of three convenience store employees in Boone County, Missouri in 1994. Johnson's execution by lethal injection proved controversial, as a botched surgery in 2008 had removed up to 20 percent of his brain tissue, resulting in permanent mental impairment.

== Early life ==
Johnson was born on August 20, 1960, in Steele, Missouri, and was raised by his grandmother in Charleston. His mother had substance abuse problems, including alcohol addiction, and Johnson had fetal alcohol spectrum disorder as a result. As an adult, Johnson was arrested and imprisoned for robbery and burglary, but he was released on parole in May 1993. Johnson also suffered from substance abuse in his adult life, and in January 1994, he asked his parole officer for assistance with alcohol addiction.

== Murders and trial ==
On February 12, 1994, Johnson killed three convenience store employees during an attempted robbery of a local Casey's in Columbia, Missouri: Mary Bratcher (46), Mable Scruggs (57), and Fred Jones (58). Johnson, who had been under the influence of cocaine at the time, had borrowed a .25-caliber pistol with the intention of robbing the store. When Bratcher attempted to destroy a key to the Casey's safe during the attempted robbery, Johnson became angry with his victims. He shot them with the borrowed gun before beating them to death with a claw hammer. Bratcher was also stabbed in the head with a screwdriver. Johnson then stored the bodies in the store's bathroom and cooler before fleeing the scene, disposing of most of his belongings in a nearby field. Bratcher and Scruggs were both mothers.

Johnson went to trial on May 11, 1995, in the Boone County Circuit Court. Prosecutor Kevin Crane told reporters that he would seek the death penalty for Johnson in connection to the murders. After a week of trial, the jury deliberated for two hours before reaching a verdict. On May 19, Johnson was convicted on three counts of first degree murder, with a recommendation that he be sentenced to death.

== Brain surgery ==
In 2008, Johnson underwent brain surgery to remove a tumor. The surgery was an incomplete success, with some tumor mass remaining, as well as scar tissue from the procedure, which led to Johnson developing epileptic seizures. Johnson feared that execution by lethal injection would result in painful seizures, and he requested that he be executed by firing squad instead. The request was denied, as the state of Missouri does not authorize use of a firing squad. It is estimated that the 2008 surgical procedure caused Johnson to lose up to 20 percent of his brain tissue; even before the surgery, however, his IQ scores ranged from 67 to 77, falling within the threshold of intellectual disability.

== Execution ==
With Johnson's execution approaching, his attorney, public defender Jeremy Weis, attempted to argue before the Missouri Supreme Court that Johnson's intellectual disability meant that execution would serve as a violation of the Eighth Amendment. On August 31, 2021, the Supreme Court rejected both Weis's claim of intellectual disability as well as his additional claim that execution by lethal injection would cause a painful seizure. As Johnson's case received more widespread media attention, a number of political and religious leaders petitioned Governor Mike Parson, in the days leading up to Johnson's death, to grant clemency. Among these petitioners were Rep. Cori Bush, Rep. Emanuel Cleaver, and Pope Francis. A number of anti-capital punishment activists also protested the execution outside of the Boone County Courthouse, petitioning Parson to halt the execution. Activists clarified that they were not asking the governor to release Johnson from prison, but that they were rather asking for a change in sentencing to life in prison.

On October 4, Parson released a statement saying that he would not grant clemency to Johnson, and that the execution would proceed as planned. Johnson died by lethal injection at 6:11 p.m. on Tuesday, October 5, 2021, at the Eastern Reception, Diagnostic and Correctional Center prison in Bonne Terre, Missouri. He read a written last statement aloud, apologizing for his actions, reiterating his love for his friends and family, and thanking those who had prayed on his behalf. As the injection began, he mouthed unknown words to his relatives. Johnson was formally pronounced dead nine minutes after receiving an injection of pentobarbital.

Johnson's last meal consisted of two double bacon cheeseburgers, onion rings, two large strawberry milkshakes and a large pizza.

== See also ==
- Capital punishment in Missouri
- List of people executed in Missouri
- List of people executed in the United States in 2021

Executions carried out in Missouri
Preceded by Walter Barton May 19, 2020	Ernest Lee Johnson; October 5, 2021	Succeeded by Carman Deck May 3, 2022
Executions carried out in the United States
Preceded by Rick Rhoades – Texas September 28, 2021	Ernest Lee Johnson – Missouri; October 5, 2021	Succeeded by Willie Smith III – Alabama October 21, 2021
