= David Hosier =

American convicted murderer and former soldier (1955–2024)

David Russell Hosier
- 2024 mugshot of David Hosier
- Born: February 10, 1955; Indiana, U.S.
- Died: June 11, 2024 (aged 69); Eastern Reception, Diagnostic and Correctional Center, Missouri, U.S.
- Cause of death: Execution by lethal injection
- Motive: Relationship issues
- Convictions: First-degree murder (Note: Hosier was convicted of solely the charge of murdering Angela Gilpin but did not face trial for the second charge of killing Angela's husband Rodney Gilpin); Assault
- Penalty: Death

Details
- Victims: Angela Gilpin, 45; Rodney Gilpin, 61
- Date: September 28, 2009
- Location: Jefferson City, Missouri
- Imprisoned at: Eastern Reception, Diagnostic and Correctional Center

David Russell Hosier (February 10, 1955 – June 11, 2024) was an American ex-sailor who was convicted of the murder of his ex-lover Angela Gilpin in 2009. Hosier had killed both Angela and her husband Rodney Gilpin out of anger due to his then girlfriend having reconciled with her husband despite their romantic relationship that lasted for years, although Hosier protested his innocence. Hosier was put on trial and found guilty, and sentenced to death on November 27, 2013. Hosier spent 10 years and 6 months on death row before he was executed by lethal injection on June 11, 2024. The murders took place in Jefferson City, Missouri.

== Background ==
David Russell Hosier was born in the American state of Indiana on February 10, 1955. Hosier's father, Glen, was a World War II navy veteran and Logansport City policeman of five years who later joined the Indiana state police in 1955. Glen was killed by a murder suspect while in the line of duty in April 1971; the suspect, Linzie Mallard, who was wanted for the murder of Judy Rucker Wells, was eventually killed by police. Hosier was said to have been deeply affected by his father's death, since they both shared a close relationship and spent time hunting, camping and taking rides together, and Hosier's mother Martha, due to the grief of losing her husband, did not pay much attention to her three children as a result.

After his father's death, Hosier enrolled into military school, where he was socially isolated. At the age of 19, Hosier joined the U.S. Navy, where he served for six years, including a member of the naval communications unit with Top Secret clearance. Hosier eventually left the navy after being granted an honorable discharge, and went on to become a firefighter in Jefferson City. Hosier married twice in his life; he married his first wife before joining the navy but divorced before the discharge, and he remarried in 1980, fathering a son and daughter with his second wife before it ended with a divorce in 1987.

Sometime in 1986, Hosier's mental health began to decline, and he was diagnosed with depression with psychotic features and bipolar disorder after being involuntarily admitted to a state hospital in 1987. Sometime in the late 2000s, Hosier suffered a stroke that reportedly caused brain damage to him.

In 1992, Hosier was arrested for assaulting his then-girlfriend. He was convicted and sentenced to eight years in prison, and subsequently released on parole in 1997.

== Murders of Angela and Rodney Gilpin ==
On September 28, 2009, in Jefferson City, Missouri, 54-year-old David Hosier went on a shooting spree that resulted in the deaths of his girlfriend and her husband, identified as 45-year-old Angela Yvonne Gilpin (December 20, 1963 – September 28, 2009) and 61-year-old Rodney Dean Gilpin (August 4, 1948 – September 28, 2009).

Prior to the double murder, Hosier had a long-term affair with Angela, who was estranged from her husband (with whom she had two sons). A short time before the murders, Angela and Rodney decided to reconcile with each other after their relationship began to improve in August 2009. Based on court sources and prosecution's case, Hosier was angered over the reconciliation between Angela and Rodney, as well as the end of his relationship with Angela. As a result, it drove Hosier into committing the murders of both Rodney and Angela on September 28, 2009, when he broke into the couple's apartment, and fatally shot the couple.

After the double murder occurred, a neighbour discovered the bodies of the couple and called the police. After first-hand investigations, the police immediately suspected Hosier as the killer. They obtained evidence that Hosier had sent threatening messages and voicemails to Angela before her death, and the police records showed that Angela had filed a report against Hosier for having allegedly stalked her before she and Rodney were killed.

At this point however, Hosier fled to Oklahoma soon after the shooting. Eventually, Hosier was arrested by the Oklahoma state authorities for the case, and subsequently sent back to Missouri to face trial for the double killings. The investigators recovered about 15 different guns from Hosier's car when they arrested him, and one of them, a STEN submachine gun, was assumed to be the murder weapon. A written note detailing how Hosier would get back at Angela over the end of the affair was also discovered inside the car as well, further indicating that he was involved.

== Murder trial, sentencing and appeals ==
=== Court proceedings ===
David Hosier was charged with two counts of first-degree murder after his arrest, and he pleaded not guilty on January 20, 2010. The prosecution in charge of Hosier's upcoming trial announced in August 2010 that they intend to seek the death penalty, which was the maximum punishment for first-degree murder under Missouri state law.

Hosier eventually stood trial before a jury at the Cole County Circuit Court on October 21, 2013. However, apart from the lesser criminal charges Hosier faced, the prosecution proceeded with solely the murder charge pertaining to the death of Angela Gilpin, but the other charge of murder pertaining to the death of Rodney Gilpin was dismissed for unspecified reasons.

It was the prosecution's case that Hosier was angered over Angela reconciling with her husband in spite of his romantic relationship with Angela, although Hosier stated that he was innocent and never killed the couple.

On October 23, 2013, after less than two hours of deliberation, the jury found Hosier guilty of first-degree murder, armed criminal action, first-degree burglary and unlawful possession of a firearm by a felon. Two days later, on October 25, 2013, the sentencing phase of the trial commenced, and the jury returned with their verdict a day after, unanimously recommending a death sentence for Hosier on the charge of murdering Angela.

On November 27, 2013, Hosier was officially sentenced to death during a formal sentencing hearing. He was also given consecutive jail terms of 15 years, 15 years and seven years for the armed criminal action, burglary, and unlawful possession charges.

=== Appeal process ===
On March 31, 2015, the Missouri Supreme Court dismissed Hosier's first appeal against his death sentence.

On December 10, 2019, the Missouri Supreme Court rejected Hosier's second appeal to review his case.

After exhausting his state appeals, Hosier brought his case further to the federal courts. On April 14, 2022, U.S. District Judge Roseann A. Ketchmark of the U.S. District Court for the Western District of Missouri turned down Hosier's first federal appeal.

The 8th Circuit Court of Appeals rejected Hosier's follow-up appeal against his conviction and sentence on January 6, 2023. The U.S. Supreme Court subsequently finalized Hosier's death sentence after rejecting his appeal in August 2023, paving way for his execution on a date to be decided.

== Execution ==
On February 14, 2024, the Missouri Supreme Court approved a death warrant for David Hosier, scheduling him to be executed on June 11, 2024, for the murder of Angela Gilpin.

A month before his scheduled execution, Hosier was hospitalized for heart failure in May 2024, and according to Hosier's sister, her brother's health became worse for the past week and on top of his heart condition, Hosier also suffered from leg swelling and severe pain.

In late May 2024, Hosier petitioned for clemency from the Missouri governor, citing his past trauma of losing his father many years ago to a criminal and its impact on his life, as well as his past service for the government and nation as a former sailor.

On June 10, 2024, the eve of Hosier's execution, Governor Mike Parson denied the clemency petition of Hosier, citing that Hosier had cruelly taken the lives of Angela and Rodney Gilpin and he never showed any remorse for his callous conduct, and hence, he should be executed for his crimes.

Reverend Jeff Hood, Hosier's spiritual adviser, told the press that Hosier was resigned to his imminent fate and accepted what was coming to him, and he spoke about his experiences of guiding Hosier throughout the final moments of his life. There were no further appeals filed at the 11th hour to delay Hosier's execution. Even up until his execution, Hosier continued to maintain his innocence over the murders.

On June 11, 2024, 69-year-old David Russell Hosier was put to death via lethal injection at Eastern Reception, Diagnostic and Correctional Center. In his final statement, Hosier continued to protest his innocence but expressed his love for his family and all the people he cared about. The execution procedure in Hosier's case proceeded with several amendments, like the use of a local anesthetic before execution so as to accommodate Hosier's health and physical conditions.

According to the Missouri Department of Corrections, Hosier's last meal consisted of a New York strip steak, a baked potato with butter and sour cream, Texas toast, Dutch apple pie and orange juice and milk.

== See also ==
- Capital punishment in Missouri
- List of people executed in Missouri
- List of people executed in the United States in 2024

Executions carried out in Missouri
Preceded by Brian Joseph Dorsey April 9, 2024	David Russell Hosier; June 11, 2024	Succeeded by Marcellus Scott Williams September 24, 2024
Executions carried out in the United States
Preceded by Jamie Ray Mills – Alabama May 30, 2024	David Russell Hosier – Missouri; June 11, 2024	Succeeded by Ramiro Felix Gonzales – Texas June 26, 2024
