= Vernon Brown (murderer) =

Executed American murderer and suspected serial killer

- Born: October 1, 1953; Indianapolis, Indiana, U.S.
- Died: May 18, 2005 (aged 51); Eastern Reception, Diagnostic and Correctional Center, Missouri, U.S.
- Other name: Thomas 'Tommy' Turner
- Status: Executed by lethal injection
- Convictions: Indiana; Assault and battery with intent to gratify sexual desire Missouri; First degree murder (2 counts)
- Penalty: Indiana; Five years imprisonment Missouri; Death

Details
- Victims: 2–4+
- Span of crimes: 1985 – 1986 (confirmed)
- Country: United States
- States: Missouri and possibly Indiana
- Date apprehended: October 26, 1986

Vernon Brown (October 1, 1953 – May 18, 2005) was an American murderer, child molester, and suspected serial killer who was convicted for the murders of a young woman and a young girl in St. Louis, Missouri in 1985 and 1986 but is suspected of committing at least two other murders, including being a prime suspect for the murder of the St. Louis Jane Doe. Brown was sentenced to death and executed in 2005 for the two murders he was convicted of, having never confessed responsibility for any other murders.

== Early life and crimes ==
Vernon Brown was born on October 1, 1953, in Indianapolis, Indiana, the oldest of five children born to different fathers. His mother was 15 at the time of his birth and the identity of Brown's father has never been established, with some speculating that he might have been the product of an incestuous relationship between his mother and his grandfather. Brown was reportedly physically and sexually abused in his youth, and supposedly suffered a head injury that caused him to have memory lapses. As a child, he was considered aloof, but was protective of his younger siblings and friends whenever they got into trouble.

Brown dropped out of high school at age 16 and attempted to enlist in the Army two years later, but was rejected for unclear reasons. In 1973, he was convicted of sexually assaulting a 12-year-old girl in Indianapolis and served 4 years of a 5-year prison sentence. After his release, he drifted around the country and worked odd jobs until he eventually settled in St. Louis, Missouri, where he married a homeless woman. A few years later, while still married to his first wife, Brown married yet again to another woman under the alias Thomas "Tommy" Turner. To support himself, he worked as a maintenance man at 4000 Enright Avenue, an area that was marred with crime and frequented by prostitutes and drug users. At around this time, Brown himself started using a variety of drugs, most notably PCP.

== Murders ==
On March 7, 1985, the body of 19-year-old Synetta Ford was found in her apartment on 3500 Washington Boulevard, having been stabbed in the throat with a butcher knife and thereafter strangled. Upon interviewing her roommate, police learned that Ford had been frightened by the maintenance man working on the building, whom she knew as Tommy Turner, but in actuality was Brown. When questioned, Brown claimed that on the night of the murder he had seen a Cuban man quickly leaving the area, but as this statement sounded dubious, he was ordered to undergo a polygraph test which he subsequently failed. Now considered a suspect, the police questioned his wife, who revealed that Brown had confessed the killing to her, providing intricate details that only the real killer would know—for example, he said that she had been strangled with an electrical cord, which was not mentioned in the media. Because of this, an arrest warrant was issued for him, but the charges had to be dropped due to a statute in Missouri law that prevented a spouse's testimony in court, even if the testimony was given willingly.

After his release, Brown moved in with 31-year-old Kathy Moore, a single mother who lived on Enright Avenue together with her three sons: 11-year-old Tommy Johnson, 9-year-old Christopher, and 7-year-old Jason Moore. After he moved in with them, he continued using drugs and would frequently rape each of his stepsons by making them perform anal and oral sex. On the afternoon of October 24, 1986, Brown was sitting on the front porch when he spotted 9-year-old Janet Perkins, who was on her way home from school, and called her to come visit him. When she entered, he ordered his stepsons to go to their rooms and lock the doors while he lured the girl to the basement, where he subsequently strangled her with a rope. Brown then wrapped Perkins' body in trash bags and dumped them inside a container in an alley behind his house, where they were subsequently found by a passerby.

== Arrest and trials ==
Soon after Perkins' body was found, police started combing the area and questioning everybody living in the neighborhood, until a witness came forward and claimed that they had last seen the girl entering Brown's house. They then went and questioned Brown, who surprisingly admitted to the crime, claiming that he had smoked cigarettes laced with PCP and then blacked out during the killing. Furthermore, police discovered that he was actually on the run from police in Indiana, where he had been charged with robbery and six counts of child molestation relating to attacks on a 7-year-old girl and an 11-year-old boy.

After the arrest of a suspect was announced in the media, an outcry of support poured out from across the city, with the leader of a student support group even organizing a march to protest the violence that had been going on in the area. In due time, it was also revealed that Brown had previously been arrested for a similar violent murder just the year prior, leading to the FBI submitting a special report into ViCAP in an attempt to possibly link him to any further crimes. This further investigation led to Brown being charged with the rape-murder of 9-year-old Kimberly K. Campbell, whose nude and battered body was found in a vacant house in Indianapolis on August 27, 1980. In addition, he was considered a possible suspect in further murders in both states, but the most well-known of these was the murder of the St. Louis Jane Doe, a yet-unidentified young girl who had been found raped, strangled and decapitated in St. Louis on February 28, 1983.

Brown was initially also suspected of the rape-slaying of 15-year-old Tracey Poindexter in 1985. However, in 2001, DNA evidence linked another man named Sterling Riggs to the crime. Riggs was convicted of murder and sentenced to 115 years in prison. On appeal, he won a new trial and eventually had his sentence reduced to 50 years. Riggs was released from prison in 2021.

=== Perkins trial ===
Brown was first put on trial for the murder of Perkins, which began in October 1988. At said trial, his three stepsons were called in and retold what their stepfather had told them to do on the night of the murder, and not long after, they heard Janet's screams through a bedroom vent. Brown himself admitted to the crime in a videotaped statement, which was played to the jurors at his trial—however, he notably omitted the fact that he had told his stepsons to lock themselves up and continued to claim that he had blacked out during the crime. After only two hours of deliberation, the jurors returned a guilty verdict on first degree murder, in spite of Brown's lawyer attempting to convince them to hand down a lesser charge of second degree murder. Upon hearing the verdict, Brown simply stood with his hands behind his back and looked with a blank expression on his face. A few days later, after taking into account various aggravating factors in the case, the jury recommended the death sentence, which was subsequently handed down to Brown.

=== Ford trial ===
Following the conclusion of his first trial, Brown was charged with the murder of Synetta Ford. While he admitted to killing her, this time he claimed that Ford had supposedly attacked him with a knife in an unprovoked attack, forcing him to grab a nearby cord and wrap it around her neck. In the ensuing struggle, he claimed that she was trying to stab him so frantically that she accidentally stabbed herself in the chest, before inflicting another fatal stab to the throat. His explanations were not believed, and he was thereafter found guilty of her killing as well.

During the penalty phase, prosecutors brought one of Brown's stepsons to testify against him, all while Brown sat silently and listened. In the closing arguments, Assistant Attorney Robert L. Garrison urged the jurors to give the death penalty, calling Brown a "destroyer of children" who posed a danger to society. In the end, jurors concurred that the case warranted capital punishment and recommended a second death sentence, which was subsequently handed down. This decision was criticized by Brown's public defender, Karen Kraft, who claimed that she had been prevented from presenting a letter from Brown's brother, a platoon sergeant stationed in Saudi Arabia, which she believed could have convinced the jury to be more lenient with the sentencing.

== Imprisonment and execution ==
On September 19, 2003, Brown's second death sentence was overturned by a federal appeals court in a 2–1 decision, with the justices ruling that the judge at the original trial had acted improperly by blocking Kraft's decision to present the letter from Brown's brother. This did not affect his death sentence in the Perkins case, which remained in place. He continued to appeal his death sentence, but his final appeals were denied by both the Supreme Court and Governor Matt Blunt, with the latter saying in a written statement that the death penalty was justified in this case.

On May 18, 2005, the day of his execution, Tom Carroll, a detective from St. Louis, attempted to talk Brown into confessing to killing the St. Louis Jane Doe after the latter was finished with watching the entirety of Platoon. To Carroll's disappointment, Brown claimed that he had nothing to say to him, and when Carroll attempted to plead with him to bring closure to the girl's family, Brown said he did not care about them. He was then transported to the execution chamber at Eastern Reception, Diagnostic and Correctional Center in Bonne Terre, where he was subsequently put to death via lethal injection. Brown's last meal consisted of shrimp, salad, and cake, and his final words were "You'll see me again. To all my friends, don't think of me as being gone, but there with you. And to Jazz, who has my heart and love. Peace, love. Vernon Brown."

As of January 2025, no further murders have been linked to Brown. He was never prosecuted for the Campbell murder and remains a suspect in the St. Louis Jane Doe case, with both of them officially remaining unsolved.

== See also ==
- Capital punishment in Missouri
- List of people executed in Missouri
- List of people executed by lethal injection
- List of people executed in the United States in 2005
