= Terry Hankins =

American serial killer (1974–2009)

- Inmate photo
- Born: Terry Lee Hankins; October 10, 1974; Tarrant County, Texas, U.S.
- Died: June 2, 2009 (aged 34); Huntsville Unit, Texas, U.S.
- Status: Execution by lethal injection
- Conviction: Capital murder (2 counts)
- Penalty: Death (May 14, 2002)

Details
- Victims: 5
- Span of crimes: October 1, 2000 – August 27, 2001
- Country: United States
- State: Texas
- Date apprehended: August 28, 2001

Terry Lee Hankins (October 10, 1974 – June 2, 2009) was an American serial killer who killed five family members in Mansfield, Texas, between October 2000 and August 2001. After fully admitting responsibility, he was convicted of two of the murders and was sentenced to death. Hankins was executed by lethal injection on June 2, 2009, becoming the 200th inmate executed in Texas under the governorship of Rick Perry.

== Early life ==
Terry Lee Hankins was born on October 10, 1974. When he was young, his parents divorced and he was sent to live with his father Ernie. Hankins was introduced to two stepmothers, both of whom he later claimed sexually abused him. At age 18, he married Tammy Bryce, and he moved in with her three children.

== Murders ==
On October 1, 2000, Hankins struck his 20-year-old half-sister Pearl Sevenstar over the head multiple times with a car jack, killing her. Afterwards he wrapped her body in a plastic sheet, and stuffed it into the front seat of a car at his father's automotive shop.

A week later, on October 8, Hankins got into an argument with his father Ernie, during which Ernie brandished a .45-caliber pistol. Terry confronted his father and grabbed hold of the gun and shot his father in the head. He later hid the body in an Arlington mobile home, and subsequently took over his father's company and changed its name; he was able to convince neighbors and workers that his father was caring for sick relatives.

To cover up his father's disappearance, he began to regularly pay his father's house bills, and would regularly check in and out of his property. In July 2001, Terry was arrested and charged with aggravated assault for beating his roommate Ruthie Bradley. After a short time in jail, he was released the following month.

On August 26, Hankins entered his wife's trailer with a gun. Upon locating his sleeping wife, he shot her once in the head. The next day, he fatally shot his sleeping stepchildren Kevin Galley, 12; and Ashley Mason, 11.

== Arrest and trial ==
Hankins was considered the prime suspect in the murders of Tammy and her children, and a warrant was put out for his arrest. Now wanted, Hankins fled to his girlfriend's apartment in Arlington. However, police eventually tracked him down, and after a five-hour standoff he surrendered without incident. Soon after his arrest, he confessed to the murders as well as to killing his father and stepsister. He told investigators where to look and their bodies were soon recovered. The confession came as a surprise to detectives since neither Hankins' father nor stepsister had ever been reported missing. Initially, he was charged with killing his step children, but not the other three. Despite his confession, he pleaded not guilty, claiming the warrant that lead to his arrest was obtained through illegal means since the evidence that was presented was largely just speculation. Hankins was found guilty of two counts of capital murder, and in May 2002 he was sentenced to death.

== Execution ==
In January 2009, with his execution date fast approaching, his lawyers attempted to get the Supreme Court to review the case, but the request was denied. On June 2, 2009, Hankins was executed via lethal injection at the Huntsville Unit. His last words were "I am sorry for what I've done and for all the pain and suffering my actions have caused. Jesus is Lord. All Glory to God." He was the 200th executed inmate in Texas under Texas governor Rick Perry, and the 439th execution since capital punishment was reinstated in the United States in 1977.

Hankins was buried at Captain Joe Byrd Cemetery.

== See also ==
- List of people executed in Texas, 2000–2009
- List of people executed in the United States in 2009
- List of serial killers in the United States

Executions carried out in Missouri
Preceded by Michael Lynn Riley May 19, 2009	Terry Lee Hankins; June 2, 2009	Succeeded by Reginald Winthrop Blanton October 27, 2009
Executions carried out in the United States
Preceded by Dennis James Skillicorn – Missouri May 20, 2009	Terry Lee Hankins – Texas; June 2, 2009	Succeeded by Daniel E. Wilson – Ohio June 3, 2009
