= Murder of Rowan Ford =

2007 rape and murder of a young girl in Missouri, U.S.

Rowan Ford
- Rowan Damia Ford, pictured before her death
- Born: Rowan Damia Ford; April 11, 1998; San Diego, California, U.S.
- Died: November 3, 2007 (aged 9); Wheaton, Missouri, U.S.
- Cause of death: Strangulation
- Known for: Victim of a rape-murder case

On November 3, 2007, in Stella, Missouri, United States, nine-year-old Rowan Damia Ford (April 11, 1998 – November 3, 2007) went missing from her house while she was sleeping in her bedroom. Six days after her disappearance, Ford's body was found in a sinkhole in McDonald County, Missouri, and forensic reports showed that Ford was raped and strangled to death.

Two suspects, Christopher Leroy Collings—a family friend of Ford—and David Wesley Spears, Ford's stepfather, were arrested and charged with raping and murdering Ford. Collings was found guilty of murder and sentenced to death in 2012 while Spears was sentenced to 11 years in prison for endangering the welfare of a child and covering up the crime. Collings was executed by lethal injection on December 3, 2024, at the Eastern Reception, Diagnostic and Correctional Center.

== Disappearance and death ==
On November 3, 2007, in Stella, Missouri, nine-year-old Rowan Ford, then a fourth-grade student, was last seen at her home before she disappeared. Her mother Colleen Munson was unable to find her and hence, Ford was reported missing. The police, as well as the FBI, conducted a large-scale search for the girl, but Ford remained unfound. It was suspected by police investigators that foul play was involved in the girl's disappearance as the search dragged on.

Six days after her disappearance, in a rural part of McDonald County, Missouri, Ford's body was found in a sinkhole. At the time of the discovery, Ford, who was covered with leaves and debris and in an advanced stage of decomposition, was nude from the waist down, wearing only one sock. Ford had a ligature mark around her neck and there were injuries on her vaginal area. An autopsy report found that Ford died due to strangulation, and the girl was raped prior to her death.

Following police investigations, the police arrested two suspects. One of them was 25-year-old David Wesley Spears, who was Ford's stepfather, while the other was Spears's friend, 32-year-old Christopher Leroy Collings. Prior to the murder, Collings had previously lived with Ford's family for several months during the summer and fall of 2007. Collings slept in the basement, and Ford affectionately looked up to him as "Uncle Chris" and Collings grew fond of the girl. Collings eventually moved to his family's farm at Wheaton, Missouri in late October 2007, and dwelt in a travel trailer on the farm. According to Collings's brother at the time of his arrest, Collings was separated from his wife, with whom he had three children, all of whom resided in Arkansas with their mother.

According to the police, both men had confessed to their role behind the murder of Ford. Based on the confessions of Collings and Spears, it was the former who had abducted Ford on the day of her disappearance and confined her inside his trailer after some heavy drinking. After he took her back to his trailer, Collings raped Ford and according to Collings, the girl had seen his face just as he was about to take her back home, and Collings, who "freaked out" from this moment, resorted to using a coil of "chicken house rope" from an old pickup truck and looped it around Ford's neck, strangling her to death. Spears was implicated since he also admitted to the rape and murder of Ford and even admitted to helping Collings to dispose of his stepdaughter's body.

After the gruesome acts, Spears would later report his stepdaughter missing and claimed that Ford might be at a friend's house, but the suspicious behaviour of Spears and demeanor during the search for Ford eventually led to police naming him as a suspect, so Collings himself was also caught and taken into custody for the rape-murder. Spears had also reportedly led the authorities to where Ford's body was found. After the arrests of both men, Ford's mother filed for divorce, and a funeral service was held for Ford in Neosho, Missouri. Many remembered Ford as a star student who was well-loved by her friends and teachers in school.

== Criminal charges and trial ==
After their arrests, both Christopher Collings and David Spears were charged with one count of first degree murder, one count of forcible rape, and one count of statutory rape. In May 2008, the prosecution officially announced their intention to seek the death penalty for both Collings and Spears, both of whom pleaded not guilty. Before the case went to trial, Collings waived his right to a preliminary hearing, and he was therefore arraigned for trial on a later date. Due to the publicity around the case, both Spears and Collings were granted a change of venue and stood trial separately in Barry County and Phelps County respectively.

On March 12, 2012, Collings first stood trial solely for the charge of first-degree murder before a jury at a Phelps County circuit court. Forensic evidence and the videotape confession of Collings were presented in court, and Spears himself appeared as a witness while awaiting trial for the murder of his stepdaughter. On March 20, 2012, Collings was found guilty of the first-degree murder of Rowan Ford. The prosecution sought the death penalty after highlighting the aggravating factors of the case, while the defence opposed the death sentence and asked for life imprisonment by highlighting that Collings was diagnosed with both severe disorganized dissociative attachment disorder and intermittent explosive disorder, and had a dysfunctional family background and tragic upbringing. The family, teachers and friends of Ford turned up in court to testify about the devastation and impact of Ford's death on their lives, while Collings's father also turned up as a witness for his son, and he expressed that he loved his son no matter what happened. On March 23, 2012, the jury returned with their verdict after 48 minutes of deliberation, sentencing Collings to death for the charge of murdering Ford. In delivering the decision, the jury found that the murder of Rowan Ford was "outrageously and wantonly vile, horrible, and inhumane" and Collings had killed Ford to avoid leaving her alive as a potential witness.

On September 26, 2012, the prosecution decided to withdraw the murder charge against Spears and instead a plea deal agreement was reached between both the prosecution and defence, with Spears pleading guilty to endangerment of a child's welfare and cover-up of the crime. The prosecution stated that further investigation had not conclusively proven that Spears participated in the murder and rape of Ford, and his role itself was minor compared to Collings, who was deemed to be the principal offender in the case. For the charges he admitted in court, Spears was sentenced to 11 years in prison. With his sentence backdated to the date of his arrest, Spears served more than seven years in prison before he was released in 2015.

== Appeals of Christopher Collings ==
In January 2014, Christopher Collings filed an appeal to the Missouri Supreme Court against his death sentence. The appeal itself was rejected on August 19, 2014. On March 6, 2018, the Missouri Supreme Court rejected a second appeal from Collings. After exhausting all his state appeals, Collings appealed his case further to the federal courts. The U.S. District Court for the Eastern District of Missouri first dismissed Collings's appeal on September 30, 2022. Later, the 8th Circuit Court of Appeals rejected a follow-up appeal from Collings on January 12, 2023. The U.S. Supreme Court rejected Collings's final appeal on April 1, 2024.

== Death warrant and clemency plea ==
On April 5, 2024, Missouri Attorney General Andrew Bailey applied to the Missouri Supreme Court for an approval to schedule an execution date for Christopher Collings, who had exhausted all his avenues of appeal at this point. Under Missouri state law, should the Missouri Supreme Court issue a death warrant, an execution date would be set between 90 and 120 days from the date of the court order. On August 13, 2024, the Missouri Supreme Court approved the death warrant of Collings, scheduling his death sentence to be carried out on December 3, 2024. Collings was the fourth condemned criminal from Missouri to be scheduled for execution in 2024. On November 12, 2024, the U.S. Supreme Court rejected Collings's appeal to postpone his execution.

During the final weeks before Collings was set to be executed, his lawyers and civil groups asked for clemency on his behalf. The Missouri Catholic Conference urged the state Governor Mike Parson to grant Collings clemency and commute his death sentence to life imprisonment on the grounds that capital punishment violated the sanctity and dignity of human life. On December 2, 2024, the eve of Collings's execution, the U.S. Supreme Court rejected Collings's final appeal to stave off his execution. Additionally, Parson confirmed that he would not grant clemency to Collings and allowed the execution to move forward.

In response to Collings's scheduled execution, Rowan Ford's 35-year-old sister Ariane Macks, who was 18 at the time of Ford's death, stated that Ford, the youngest of five siblings in the family, was like a "ray of sunshine" and hence losing her was a painful experience. Macks, who resided in Alabama when she accepted a media interview, told USA Today that Collings deserved to be sentenced to death for raping and murdering her sister, and added that lethal injection was not the method of death she preferred when it came to Collings's execution.

== Execution of Collings ==
On December 3, 2024, 49-year-old Christopher Leroy Collings was put to death via lethal injection at the Eastern Reception, Diagnostic and Correctional Center. In his last words, Collings expressed remorse and accepted responsibility for the crime, and apologized for the pain he caused. He was pronounced dead at 6:10 p.m. after receiving a single dose of pentobarbital. For his final meal, Collings ate a bacon cheeseburger, breaded mushrooms, tater tots and a chef salad. Collings became the 23rd condemned person in the U.S. to be executed during the year 2024, as well as the fourth death row inmate scheduled for execution in Missouri that same year. The execution of Collings left eight inmates to remain on death row in Missouri as of December 2024.

== Aftermath ==
In the aftermath, a book entitled Lost Angels: The murders of Rowan Ford and Doug Ringler was published in 2019, covering the murder of Ford, which shocked the whole community of Stella when it was first reported.

In response to Collings's death warrant, former Barry County Sheriff Mick Epperly, who had originally investigated the murder of Rowan Ford in 2007, stated that the murder case was the most unforgettable case he had come across in his whole law enforcement career before he retired. Epperly stated that Collings deserved to be sentenced to death for the rape and murder of the girl. Newton County Sheriff Chris Jennings similarly stated that he had waited for the day to attend the execution, as the case was personally the most horrendous he ever came across in his career as a police officer.

Spears, Ford's former stepfather, was released in March 2015 and he went on to work for one year and eight months at the state's public defender office from June 27, 2016, to November 2017, while on probation. Spears continues to work for the state's public defender office as of February 2025. Spears declined to speak about the upcoming execution of Collings when it was scheduled in 2024.

== See also ==
- Capital punishment in Missouri
- List of people executed in Missouri
- List of people executed in the United States in 2024
- List of solved missing person cases (post-2000)

Executions carried out in Missouri
Preceded by Marcellus Williams September 24, 2024	Christopher Collings; December 3, 2024	Succeeded by Lance Shockley October 14, 2025
Executions carried out in the United States
Preceded by Carey Grayson – Alabama November 21, 2024	Christopher Collings – Missouri; December 3, 2024	Succeeded by Joseph Corcoran – Indiana December 18, 2024
