= Bert Leroy Hunter =

Executed American serial killer

- Born: March 7, 1947; Rushville, Missouri, U.S.
- Died: June 28, 2000 (aged 53); Potosi Correctional Center, Mineral Point, Missouri, U.S.
- Cause of death: Execution by lethal injection
- Conviction: First degree murder (3 counts)
- Penalty: Life imprisonment (1969); Death (1989)

Details
- Victims: 3
- Span of crimes: 1968–1988
- Country: United States
- State: Missouri
- Date apprehended: January 1989

Bert Leroy Hunter (March 7, 1947 – June 28, 2000) was an American serial killer. He committed the double murder of an elderly woman and her son in Jefferson City, Missouri, in 1988, together with accomplice Tomas Grant Ervin.

Both Hunter and Ervin were sentenced to death for their respective roles in the murders, despite Ervin maintaining his innocence. Hunter was executed in 2000, while Ervin was executed in 2001.

== First crimes and murder ==
Hunter's first known crime dates back to 1963, when the then-16-year-old and 19-year-old Oscar Hoskins were arrested on a burglary charge in relation to a break-in into a gas station in Winthrop. As he was considered a juvenile at the time, Hunter was given a lenient sentence and was released a few years later.

Following his release, Hunter developed a relationship with a young woman who lived in Atchison, Kansas, and would periodically visit her along with a friend named Carl W. Paxton. On June 15, 1968, Hunter and Paxton went to a tavern in Amazonia, Missouri, intent on robbing the place. During said robbery, they shot the owner John Montford Lyle in the head, killing him instantly. After stealing some money, the pair returned to Atchison, where they hid it in a box under some baby clothing. Not long after, Hunter's girlfriend and her roommate were questioned by police, and they soon implicated Hunter and Paxton in the murder.

Hunter and Paxton were ordered to stand trial in Savannah for killing Lyle, with the former attempting to have the trial judge dismissed by alleging bias against him. Both men were found guilty of the murder, and shortly after his sentence, Hunter attempted to file an appeal for a new trial. Under Missouri's second offender law, he was eligible for the death penalty, but the jury instead sentenced him to life imprisonment.

A couple of months later, Hunter filed an appeal to the Supreme Court of Missouri, claiming that his rights had been violated because his confession to the Lyle murder had allegedly been obtained under duress. In the brief, he claimed that the arresting Missouri State Highway Patrol officer had told him that he would only be prosecuted for stealing $50 if he confessed. His appeal was dismissed by the presiding judge, who stated that his claim was unreasonable and stretched credulity.

=== Meeting Tomas Ervin ===
While serving his life term at the Missouri State Penitentiary, Hunter befriended Tomas Grant Ervin, a fellow murderer who was serving a life term for stabbing 36-year-old taxi cab driver Robert Berry to death in 1967. Both men were eventually granted parole in their respective cases, with Hunter moving to Largo, Florida, while Ervin settled in Jefferson City, Missouri.

== Double murder ==
In November 1988, Hunter visited Ervin at his home in Jefferson City, where the pair discussed ways to make money quickly. They initially considered robbing a bank, but Ervin suggested that they should kidnap someone and force them to withdraw money from a bank account.

This idea was put on hold for about a month as Hunter briefly returned to Largo. He returned to Jefferson City, and, on December 15, the pair decided to carry out their plan and drove around town. Ervin noticed a luxurious Lincoln Continental parked in front of a house, and since he assumed that the owner was wealthy, he convinced Hunter to rob whoever was inside. The latter posed as a delivery man and knocked on the door, which 75-year-old Mildred Lorene Hodges opened. The pair then forced their way in, alerting the woman's son, 49-year-old Richard Earl Hodges, who came running to help. Instead, the intruders forced him to bind and tie up his mother.

While the Hodgeses pleaded for their lives and promised not to call the police, Hunter and Ervin did not want to leave witnesses, so they suffocated the two victims with plastic trash bags they had brought. They then left the home and returned in the evening, ransacking the place and wrapping up the bodies in trash bags and duct tape. They dumped Richard's body in a marsh near Marion, leaving Mildred's body at the house. Afterwards, Hunter and Ervin drove with the stolen Lincoln Continental to Paducah, Kentucky, where they planned to rob a bank, but instead they abandoned the car at a parking lot in front of an inn and set it on fire.

== Arrest, trial, and sentence ==
When Mildred's body was eventually found and police were called, officers at the scene noticed a notepad that contained one part of a license plate number, presumably written down by Mildred. An examination of that number led them to Ervin, who provided the authorities of receipts from job offers in an attempt to produce an alibi - instead, he accidentally placed himself in Paducah on the date that the burned Lincoln Continental was found. Not long after, they traced another license plate to Hunter, who had been imprisoned in Florida on a parole violation.

Both men were put on trial for the murders, were found guilty, and each was sentenced to death. At his own trial, Hunter pleaded guilty and requested that he be sentenced to death, as he was reportedly clinically depressed and suicidal at the time. When an initial execution date was set for 1994, an appeal on Hunter's behalf was filed by an anti-death penalty group. The United States District Court for the Western District of Missouri issued a stay of execution just hours prior to Hunter's scheduled execution, much to the annoyance of the contemporary Attorney General Jay Nixon.

== Executions ==
=== Hunter ===
Hunter received a new execution date scheduled for June 28, 2000. Whilst he initially had pleaded guilty and requested the death sentence, he later changed his mind and unsuccessfully attempted to withdraw the plea, arguing that he was mentally ill at the time.

Governor Mel Carnahan declined all appeals, and Hunter was subsequently executed via lethal injection at the Potosi Correctional Center on the aforementioned date. His final words were reportedly “There is no justice. It’s time for this nightmare to be over, as far as I’m concerned.” His lawyer, Cheryl Rafert, would later claim that he had violently convulsed during the procedure, a claim circulated by groups opposing the death penalty. Three reporters present at the execution, however, claimed that no such thing had happened and they had only seen Hunter cough a few times before succumbing to the effects of the drug.

=== Ervin ===
Ervin maintained his innocence in the double murder throughout the proceedings until his death, claiming that he had been at home at the time of the crime. When questioned, he claimed that Hunter had left with a third man he did not recognize, alleging that this unnamed individual was the one who had killed the Hodgeses.

Like Hunter before him, all of Ervin's appeals were denied. He was executed via lethal injection at the Potosi Correctional Center on March 28, 2001, still professing his innocence.

== In the media and culture ==
The murders of the Hodgeses were covered on an episode of Swamp Murders, titled "Wrong Side of the Tracks".

== See also ==
- List of people executed by lethal injection
- List of people executed in Missouri
- List of people executed in the United States in 2000
- List of people executed in the United States in 2001
- List of serial killers in the United States
