= Murder of Carl Graham Jr. =

2005 murder of a state trooper in Missouri, U.S.

Carl Graham Jr.
- Born: Carl Dewayne Graham Jr. March 3, 1968; St. Charles County, Missouri, U.S.
- Died: March 20, 2005 (aged 37); Carter County, Missouri, U.S.
- Cause of death: Murder by shooting
- Resting place: Stanfield Cemetery
- Occupation: Missouri State Highway Patrol (Sergeant)

On March 20, 2005, Sergeant Carl Dewayne Graham Jr. (March 3, 1968 – March 20, 2005), a state patrol trooper in the US state of Missouri, was fatally shot by Lance Collin Shockley (January 19, 1977 – October 14, 2025), a suspect in Sergeant Graham's investigation into a deadly car accident. Shockley was arrested three days later for the fatal hit-and-run, and was subsequently charged with the murder of Sergeant Graham, who officials believe Shockley murdered in a failed attempt to stop the investigation of the accident.

Shockley was found guilty of first-degree murder, and sentenced to death by Carter County Circuit Court Judge David Evans in accordance with Missouri law after jurors deadlocked on a sentence during the penalty phase of the trial. Shockley was executed on October 14, 2025.

== Background and murder ==
On the evening of November 26, 2004, Lance Collin Shockley and his sister-in-law's fiancé, Jeffrey Bayless, went for a drive in Bayless's truck, and both men got into an accident near Van Buren, Missouri. Shockley only sustained minor injuries and left the scene of the crash, enlisting the help of a local couple to render aid to Bayless who remained trapped in the truck. However, upon further inspection, Bayless turned out to have been fatally injured in the crash.

Missouri State Highway Patrol Sergeant Carl Dewayne Graham Jr. ran the investigation of the car accident and recovered crushed beer cans and a tequila bottle inside the truck and a blood smear above the passenger-side wheel well on the outside of the truck. Shockley was named a prime suspect in the suspected DUI and in Bayless's death, which had been classified as involuntary manslaughter.

A few months later, on March 20, 2005, on returning home from his patrol shift, Sergeant Graham, then a 12-year veteran of the Missouri State Highway Patrol, was shot and killed with a rifle. Autopsy results showed that one of the bullets was fired from behind Graham and severed his spinal cord at the neck. Another two gunshot wounds were found in the face and shoulder. In addition, Graham had sustained further trauma (including multiple skull and rib fractures) upon impact with the pavement.

On March 23, 2005, Shockley was arrested in connection with the hit-and-run, and subsequently linked to the murder of Graham, adding to his charges. His suspected motive was to stop the crash investigation, having been identified as the prime suspect behind the DUI and Bayless's involuntary manslaughter.

== Trial of Lance Shockley ==
Lance Collin Shockley
- Born: January 19, 1977; Chaffee, Missouri, Missouri, U.S.
- Died: October 14, 2025 (aged 48); Bonne Terre, Missouri, Missouri, U.S.
- Cause of death: Executed by lethal injection
- Conviction: Capital murder
- Penalty: Death

Details
- Victims: 1
- Date: March 20, 2005
- Country: United States
- Location: Carter County, Missouri

On March 29, 2005, 28-year-old Lance Shockley was charged with both first-degree murder and armed criminal action. A day later, on March 30, 2005, the prosecution filed an official notice to seek the death penalty against Shockley. Under Missouri state law, first-degree murder carries either a sentence of life in prison without parole or the death penalty if convicted.

In May 2008, it was reported that Shockley would stand trial in Carter County on August 11, 2008, but the trial was delayed. Eventually, on March 22, 2009, four years after the murder of Sergeant Graham, Shockley's murder trial began at the Howell County Circuit Court, after the trial venue was moved from Carter County. Jury selection was completed three days before the first day of trial.

During the trial itself, the prosecution charged that Shockley had the motive of killing Sergeant Graham, with the intention to stop further investigations into the car accident, although the defense argued that Shockley was innocent and he did not commit the murder. The prosecution and defense rested their cases on March 26, 2009.

On March 27, 2009, Shockley was found guilty of first-degree murder, after the jury deliberated for three hours and returned with their verdict. Reportedly, the Graham family were grateful towards the jury over the guilty verdict, which they described as an answer to their prayers.

On March 28, 2009, the jury deadlocked on whether to impose the death penalty or life without parole for Shockley, and as a result, the sentence was left up to the trial judge to decide, as per Missouri law.

On May 22, 2009, Carter County Circuit Judge David Evans sentenced 32-year-old Lance Shockley to death during a formal sentencing trial. According to Shockley's lawyer, his client stoically took the decision. Attorney general Chris Koster and Captain Billy E. Chadwick both responded that the sentence was appropriate and fair.

== Appeals ==
On April 30, 2013, four years after Lance Shockley was condemned to death row, his first appeal was filed to the Missouri Supreme Court. On August 14, 2013, the Missouri Supreme Court rejected his appeal against his death sentence.

On July 10, 2017, Circuit Judge Kelly Parker turned down Shockley's post-conviction appeal against his death sentence.

Subsequently, the U.S. Supreme Court rejected two appeals from Shockley in 2014 and 2016 respectively.

The Missouri Supreme Court heard another appeal from Shockley in 2018, before the court dismissed it on April 16, 2019, upholding both his death sentence and murder conviction.

On March 31, 2025, Shockley's final appeal was denied by the U.S. Supreme Court. On the same date Shockley's final appeal was dismissed, a motion was filed to the Missouri Supreme Court to schedule an execution date for Shockley.

== Execution ==
=== Death warrant ===
On June 25, 2025, the Missouri Supreme Court issued a death warrant for Lance Shockley, scheduling his death sentence to be carried out on October 14, 2025.

=== Clemency ===
On October 10, 2025, anti-death penalty advocates appealed to the Missouri Governor Mike Kehoe to grant clemency to Shockley. On October 13, 2025, the eve of the execution, Shockley was denied clemency by Governor Kehoe.

=== Lethal injection ===
On October 14, 2025, 48-year-old Lance Shockley was put to death via lethal injection at the Eastern Reception, Diagnostic and Correctional Center at 6:13pm. His final meal consisted of peanut butter, three packs of oatmeal, water, and two sports drinks from the prison canteen. In his final statement, he said, "So also you have sorrow now, but I will see you again, and your hearts will rejoice, and no one will take your joy from you."

Shockley was one of seven inmates executed in October 2025 across the United States. Shockley was also one of four inmates slated to be executed within the same week; one of them, Samuel Lee Smithers, who was found guilty of murdering two sex workers in Florida, received the same execution date as Shockley. Smithers and Shockley were executed an hour apart from each other. Shockley was also the only person from Missouri to be executed during the year of 2025.

== See also ==
- Capital punishment in Missouri
- List of most recent executions by jurisdiction
- List of people executed in Missouri
- List of people executed in the United States in 2025

Executions carried out in Missouri
Preceded by Christopher Collings December 3, 2024	Lance Shockley; October 14, 2025	Succeeded by most recent
Executions carried out in the United States
Preceded by Samuel Lee Smithers – Florida October 14, 2025	Lance Shockley – Missouri; October 14, 2025	Succeeded by Charles Ray Crawford – Mississippi October 15, 2025
