= Murders of Julie and Robin Kerry =

1991 murders in Missouri, United States

Marlin Gray
- Born: September 29, 1967; United States
- Died: October 26, 2005 (aged 38); Eastern Reception, Diagnostic and Correctional Center, Missouri, U.S.
- Status: Executed by lethal injection
- Conviction: First degree murder (2 counts)
- Penalty: Death

The murders of Julie and Robin Kerry occurred on April 5, 1991, on the Chain of Rocks Bridge over the Mississippi River in St. Louis, Missouri. The two sisters were raped and then murdered by a group of four males, who also attempted to murder the sisters' cousin.

On December 9, 1992, Marlin A. Gray (September 29, 1967 – October 26, 2005) was convicted of aiding and abetting for being a part of the group of four men involved in the murders. He was executed on October 26, 2005, by the U.S. state of Missouri by lethal injection. He maintained his innocence to the end, saying that although he was at the bridge at the time, he was smoking cannabis in a nearby car. In his final statement, Gray decried his execution as a "lynching". In 2017, DNA evidence proved that Gray was an active participant in the crimes.

== Events of April 4–5, 1991 ==
On the night of April 4/morning of April 5, 20-year-old Julie Kerry, 19-year-old Robin Kerry, and their 19-year-old cousin, Thomas Cummins, were on the Chain of Rocks Bridge over the Mississippi River. Gray, Antonio Richardson, Reginald Clemons, and Daniel Winfrey went to the bridge that night together. The two groups, who did not know each other, had a brief conversation. Gray showed the other group how to climb down a manhole on the bridge down to the pier. Then the two groups separated.

=== Prosecution's version of the events ===
According to testimony offered on behalf of the prosecution, several minutes later the group of four men decided to rob the three, with Winfrey testifying that Gray said he "felt like hurting somebody." They returned and Gray told Cummins, "This is a robbery. Get down on the ground." The two girls were grabbed and held on the ground. Richardson held Julie down while Clemons raped her and then the two swapped positions. Gray, Richardson, and Clemons then alternately raped Robin and Julie. Cummins was then robbed of his wallet, wristwatch, cash, and keys, and the three victims were forced down the manhole to the concrete pier. The two Kerry sisters then were pushed, and Cummins jumped as instructed. Medical witnesses testified that Cummins and Julie Kerry survived the 48-foot (15 m) fall to the water below. Cummins testified that after he surfaced, the current pulled him over to Julie, but then she drifted off after he began to drown. Cummins swam to shore and survived. The body of Julie Kerry was found three weeks later near Caruthersville, Missouri; the body of Robin Kerry was never found.

=== Gray's denial ===
Gray claimed to have not been at the scene during the crimes, but that had gone to a nearby car to smoke marijuana. These claims were disproven in 2017, when DNA evidence proved Gray was an active participant in the crimes.

== Trial and appeals ==
Police initially refused to believe Thomas Cummins' version of the events. They theorized that the other men never existed and he had made up the story to cover up his attempted rape of his cousins. They believed Julie had fallen off the bridge while resisting his sexual advances, Robin had jumped in to save her, and both had drowned. Cummins was initially charged with murder but released due to lack of evidence. He later won a settlement from the St. Louis Police Department for wrongful interrogation techniques.

Daniel Winfrey, who was 15 years old at the time, confessed to the murder in the presence of police and his parents. He pleaded guilty to second-degree murder and forcible rape and testified against the other three in their trials. He received a 30-year sentence. He testified that Clemons and Richardson were the ones who had pushed the two girls. Winfrey was the only white member of the convicted group, which has been raised as a criticism since he was the main prosecution witness. However, since Winfrey was only 15, he would've been ineligible for the death penalty, even under state law at the time.

Winfrey was granted parole in the summer of 2007; when released, he had served 15 years.

Clemons was sentenced to death but his conviction was overturned in 2015. On December 18, 2017, Clemons pleaded guilty to five counts: two counts of second degree murder, two counts of rape and one count of first degree robbery. He was sentenced to five consecutive life sentences without the possibility of parole.

Richardson was also given a death sentence; however, it was commuted to life in prison by the Supreme Court of Missouri on October 28, 2003, since he was a juvenile at the time of the murder. The court cited his sentencing by a judge rather than a jury to be in violation of Apprendi v. New Jersey (a case that was decided long after the imposition of sentence). Richardson had been the focus of strenuous efforts by death penalty opponents due to his alleged mental deficiencies and because of his age at the time of the murders, even though his own psychologist and his mother testified that he "know[s] the difference between right and wrong." In 2005, the Supreme Court of the United States ruled that executions of persons who committed their crimes as juveniles were unconstitutional.

== Execution ==
Gray's execution date was set by the Missouri Supreme Court for October 26, 2005. Governor Matt Blunt denied Gray clemency on October 25, based on a recommendation by the Missouri Board of Probation and Parole. That same day, the Supreme Court of the United States denied his motions to stay his execution.

Gray asked that no member of his family witness the execution, which he described as "murder," although a female cousin and a minister were present. The only witness for the victims present at the execution was Kevin Cummins, the uncle of the Kerry sisters and Thomas Cummins. Gray also made no last meal request and gave no instructions for the disposal of his body. His final statement: "I go forward now on wings built by the love and support of my family and friends. I go with a peace of mind that comes from never having taken a human life. I forgive those who have hardened their hearts to the truth and I pray they ask forgiveness, for they know not what they do. This is not a death, it is a lynching."

== New evidence ==
Reginald Clemons was awarded a new trial in 2015. Prosecutors presented new evidence that proved Gray was on the bridge during the crimes. Clemons' guilty plea states "DNA from Clemons and a co-defendant, Marlin [Gray], indicative of sexual activity was found on pants Gray wore during the crime". For his plea, Clemons was given five consecutive life sentences, without the possibility of parole, instead of the death penalty.

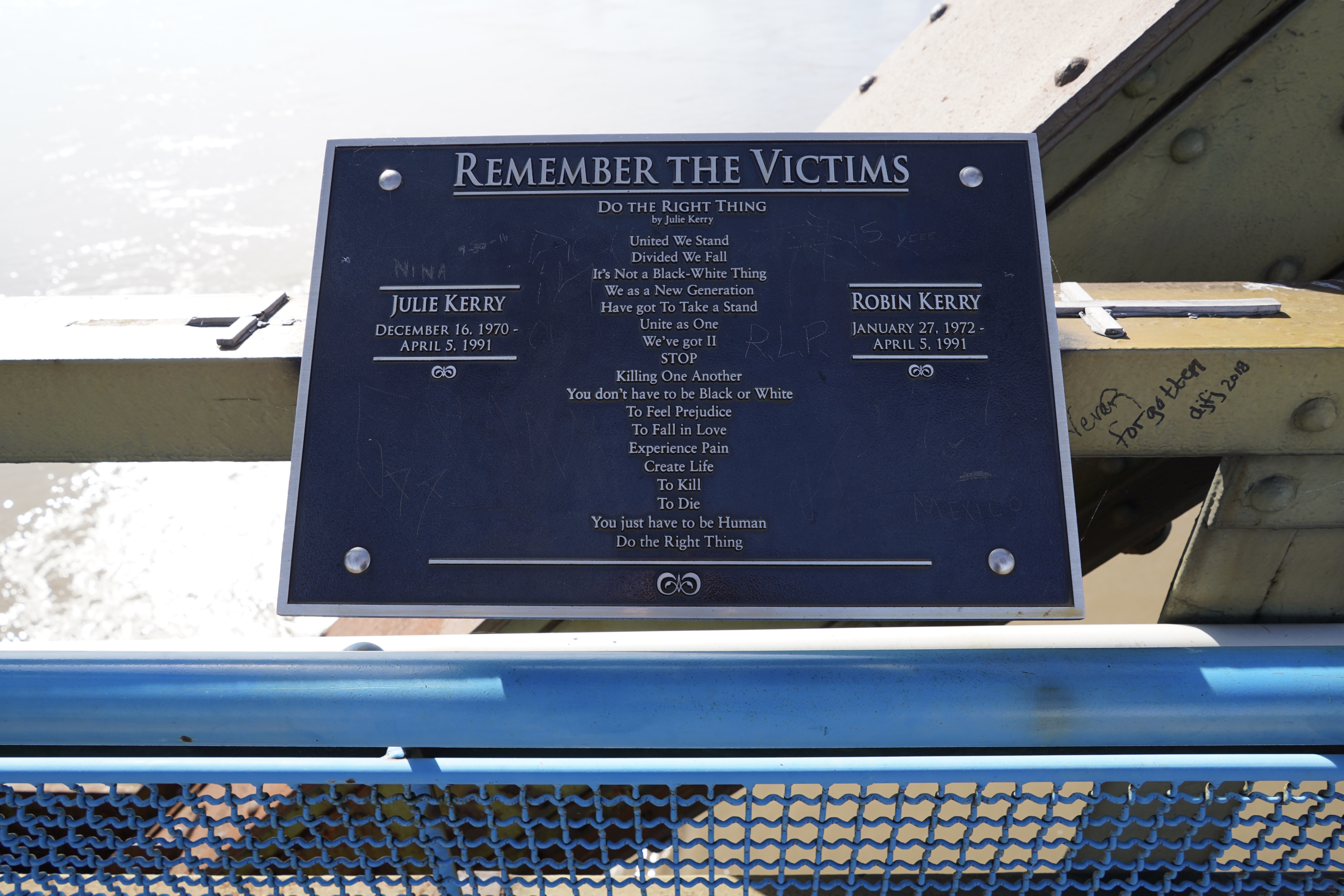
Chain of Rocks Bridge Memorial

== Media ==
The murder of Julie and Robin Kerry was the subject of a 2005 episode of American Justice entitled "The Bridge Murders".

Thomas Cummins' sister Jeanine Cummins wrote a memoir about the murders entitled A Rip in Heaven.

== See also ==
- Capital punishment in Missouri
- Capital punishment in the United States
- List of people executed in Missouri
- List of people executed in the United States in 2005
