= Jailhouse confession =

Confession to a crime while in custody

A jailhouse confession is a confession to a crime given by a prisoner to another inmate while in custody. Legal regimes have developed with respect to the use of jailhouse confessions in the prosecution of crimes.

== United States ==
Writing in the California Law Review in 1990, Jana Winograde commented that, in California, "Jailhouse informants who recount their fellow prisoners' "confessions" are often used by the state as witnesses in criminal prosecutions. It has recently become public knowledge that such confessions are easily fabricated." Such fabricated testimony may constitute a false confession and the accused person is often powerless to challenge or refute its veracity. Jailhouse informants, who report hearsay (admissions against penal interest) which they claim to have heard while the accused is in pretrial detention, usually in exchange for sentence reductions or other inducements, have been the focus of particular controversy. Some examples of their use are in connection with Stanley Williams, Cameron Todd Willingham, Thomas Silverstein, Marshall "Eddie" Conway, and a suspect in the disappearance of Etan Patz. The Innocence Project has stated that 15% of all wrongful convictions later exonerated because of DNA results were accompanied by false testimony by jailhouse informants. In 2011, the Orlando Sentinel reported that 50% of murder convictions exonerated by DNA were accompanied by false testimony by jailhouse informants.

Jailhouse confessions may be discovered through means other than informants, such as placing a covert listening device in a subject's jail cell and monitoring their communications to see whether they make a self-incriminating statement. In the 1977 case of United States v. Hearst, the United States Court of Appeals for the Ninth Circuit held that the government's secret use of an electronic recording device to record a prisoner's conversations did not violate the Sixth Amendment to the United States Constitution.

== Notable cases ==
- In the 1966 case of Jacob Rubenstein v. State of Texas, the Texas Court of Criminal Appeals ruled that Jack Ruby (real name Jacob Rubenstein; "Jack Ruby" was his nickname), the killer of Lee Harvey Oswald, had been denied a fair trial, holding in part that Ruby's jailhouse confession was improperly admitted into evidence at trial.
- During the McMartin preschool trial in the 1980s, jailhouse informant George Freeman was called as a witness to testified that defendant Ray Buckey had confessed to him while sharing a cell. Freeman later attempted to flee the country and confessed to perjury in a series of other criminal cases in which he manufactured testimony in exchange for favorable treatment by the prosecution in other cases, in several instances fabricating jailhouse confessions of other inmates.
- In the 1991 case of Arizona v. Fulminante, the United States Supreme Court held that a jailhouse confession had been coerced where an inmate who was a confidential informant for the Federal Bureau of Investigation told another inmate who was suspected of murder that he could protect the suspect inmate from "tough treatment" in prison in exchange for a confession to the murder.
- During the investigation of the murder of Felicia Gayle in the late 1990s, police arrested Marcellus Williams for the crime based in part on an alleged jailhouse confession to fellow inmate Henry Cole. The conviction has been called into question due to this aspect.
