= Eastern Reception, Diagnostic and Correctional Center =

Prison in Bonne Terre, Missouri

Coordinates: 37°55′28″N 90°30′52″W

- Interactive map of Eastern Reception, Diagnostic and Correctional Center
- Location: 2727 Hwy K Bonne Terre, Missouri
- Status: Open
- Security class: Minimum, Medium, Maximum, Diagnostic, Executions
- Capacity: 2684
- Opened: 2003
- Managed by: Missouri Department of Corrections
- Warden: Richard Adams

The Eastern Reception, Diagnostic and Correctional Center (ERDCC) is a 2,684-bed prison located in a detached eastern section of Bonne Terre, Missouri. It is home to adult males who are awaiting beds at other facilities, is a medical flat camp, houses inmates serving life sentences and where death row inmates receive lethal injection.

The ERDCC serves as the point of admission for male offenders committed by the courts in eastern Missouri to the Missouri Department of Corrections (MODOC), responsible for their classification through medical and mental tests. ERDCC houses the State of Missouri execution chamber. Programs at this facility include restorative justice, Narcotics Anonymous and Alcoholics Anonymous, Impact on Crime, Seven points of highly successful people, and Storylink.

It operates a cooked and chilled food facility, a unit that prepares and transports all regular and special diet meals to the Potosi Correctional Center, Farmington Correctional Center and Missouri Eastern Correctional Centers and the St. Louis Community Release Center.

NPR reported an outbreak of COVID-19 cases at the facility in August 2021. Universal testing for COVID-19 had not occurred since August 2020 even though ERDCC is an intake facility for prisoners brought in from county jails which do not have the same testing, quarantine and isolation protocols as the DOC. Severe staffing shortage caused inmates to be held on extended and frequent lockdowns, unable to leave their cells, not even for medical appointments.

== Notable inmates ==
- Levi King – Spree killer. Murdered a family in Gray County, Texas. Featured on Investigation Discovery's Most Evil.
- Stephan Cannon – Murderer of retired police chief David Dorn.

=== Executed ===
- Vernon Brown – Executed on May 18, 2005.
- Marlin Gray – Executed on October 26, 2005.
- Dennis Skillicorn – Executed on May 20, 2009.
- Joseph Paul Franklin – Serial killer. Executed on November 20, 2013.
- Allen L. Nicklasson – Executed on December 11, 2013.
- Michael Anthony Taylor – Executed on February 26, 2014.
- Roderick Nunley – Executed on September 1, 2015.
- Russell Earl Bucklew – Executed on October 1, 2019.
- Ernest Lee Johnson – Triple murderer. Murdered three convenience store workers in Columbia, Missouri. Executed on October 5, 2021.
- Carman Deck – Executed on May 3, 2022.
- Kevin Johnson Jr. – Executed on November 29, 2022.
- Amber McLaughlin – Executed on January 3, 2023.
- Leonard S. Taylor – Executed on February 7, 2023.
- Michael Andrew Tisius – Executed on June 6, 2023.
- Johnny Allen Johnson – Executed on August 1, 2023.
- Brian Joseph Dorsey – Executed on April 9, 2024.
- David Hosier – Executed on June 11, 2024.
- Marcellus Williams – Executed on September 24, 2024.
- Christopher Leroy Collings – Executed on December 3, 2024.
- Lance Collin Shockley – Executed on October 14, 2025.

== See also ==
- Capital punishment in Missouri
