= Mineral Point, Missouri =

- Village
- Location of Mineral Point, Missouri
- Coordinates: 37°56′44″N 90°43′29″W
- Country: United States
- State: Missouri
- County: Washington
- Incorporated: 1905

Area
  - Total: 0.24 sq mi (0.62 km^{2})
  - Land: 0.24 sq mi (0.62 km^{2})
  - Water: 0 sq mi (0.00 km^{2})
- Elevation: 886 ft (270 m)

Population (2020)
  - Total: 231
  - Density: 963.9/sq mi (372.17/km^{2})
- Time zone: UTC-6 (Central (CST))
  - Summer (DST): UTC-5 (CDT)
- ZIP code: 63660
- Area code: 573
- FIPS code: 29-48710
- GNIS feature ID: 2396768

Mineral Point is a village in Washington County, Missouri, United States. The population was 351 at the 2010 census.

== History ==
Mineral Point had its start in the 1850s as a lead-mining settlement. The community owes its name to the wealth of minerals found in the vicinity. Mineral Point was situated along the St. Louis, Iron Mountain and Southern Railway. A post office has been in operation at Mineral Point since 1858.

== Geography ==
Mineral Point is located at 37°56′43″N 90°43′28″W (37.945181, -90.724493).

According to the United States Census Bureau, the village has a total area of 0.24 square miles (0.62 km^{2}), all land.

== Demographics ==
Historical population
Census	Pop.	Note	%±
1910	290		—
1920	258		−11.0%
1930	347		34.5%
1940	350		0.9%
1950	304		−13.1%
1960	332		9.2%
1970	369		11.1%
1980	358		−3.0%
1990	384		7.3%
2000	363		−5.5%
2010	351		−3.3%
2020	231		−34.2%
U.S. Decennial Census

=== 2010 census ===
As of the census of 2010, there were 351 people, 124 households, and 85 families living in the village. The population density was 1,462.5 inhabitants per square mile (564.7/km^{2}). There were 131 housing units at an average density of 545.8 per square mile (210.7/km^{2}). The racial makeup of the village was 92.0% White, 4.6% African American, 0.3% Native American, 0.3% Asian, 0.6% from other races, and 2.3% from two or more races. Hispanic or Latino of any race were 0.9% of the population.

There were 124 households, of which 42.7% had children under the age of 18 living with them, 38.7% were married couples living together, 21.0% had a female householder with no husband present, 8.9% had a male householder with no wife present, and 31.5% were non-families. 26.6% of all households were made up of individuals, and 8.9% had someone living alone who was 65 years of age or older. The average household size was 2.83 and the average family size was 3.45.

The median age in the village was 33.2 years. 31.3% of residents were under the age of 18; 9.1% were between the ages of 18 and 24; 23.7% were from 25 to 44; 26.5% were from 45 to 64; and 9.4% were 65 years of age or older. The gender makeup of the village was 47.0% male and 53.0% female.

=== 2000 census ===
As of the census of 2000, there were 363 people, 130 households, and 89 families living in the town. The population density was 1,425.5 inhabitants per square mile (550.4/km^{2}). There were 136 housing units at an average density of 534.1 per square mile (206.2/km^{2}). The racial makeup of the town was 92.29% White, 3.03% African American, 0.83% Native American, 1.38% from other races, and 2.48% from two or more races. Hispanic or Latino of any race were 1.65% of the population.

There were 130 households, out of which 40.0% had children under the age of 18 living with them, 44.6% were married couples living together, 19.2% had a female householder with no husband present, and 30.8% were non-families. 25.4% of all households were made up of individuals, and 12.3% had someone living alone who was 65 years of age or older. The average household size was 2.79 and the average family size was 3.33.

In the town the population was spread out, with 32.2% under the age of 18, 9.6% from 18 to 24, 26.7% from 25 to 44, 21.8% from 45 to 64, and 9.6% who were 65 years of age or older. The median age was 31 years. For every 100 females, there were 95.2 males. For every 100 females age 18 and over, there were 85.0 males.

The median income for a household in the town was $15,455, and the median income for a family was $16,591. Males had a median income of $24,583 versus $18,750 for females. The per capita income for the town was $8,365. About 36.5% of families and 40.4% of the population were below the poverty line, including 52.3% of those under age 18 and 12.0% of those age 65 or over.

== Government and infrastructure ==
The United States Postal Service operates the Mineral Point Post Office.

The Potosi Correctional Center of the Missouri Department of Corrections is located in an unincorporated area in Washington County, near Mineral Point. The prison houses male death row inmates.

The old Missouri Pacific line between St. Louis and Texarkana serves Mineral Point.
