= Capital punishment in Missouri =

Capital punishment is a legal penalty in the U.S. state of Missouri. On a per capita basis, it ranks third in executions, behind Oklahoma and Texas.

== History ==
Capital punishment in Missouri was first used in 1810 in the form of hanging. From 1810 to 1965, 285 people were executed. From 1966-1988 none were executed, and from 1989-2025, 102 persons were executed. From 1937 until 1987 lethal gas inhalation was used. By 1987, inmates could choose lethal injection as opposed to lethal gas. Lloyd Leo Anderson, a convicted murderer, was the last person executed in the gas chamber in Missouri on February 26, 1965.

Missouri abolished the death penalty in 1917. However, it was reinstated in 1919. This was mainly a response to the recent lynching of Jay Lynch, a career criminal who had just received a life sentence after pleading to the murder of a police officer and his son.

After the execution of Lance Collin Shockley for the 2005 murder of an MSHP trooper, eight inmates remain on death row in Missouri as of August 2026.

== Legal process ==
When the prosecution seeks the death penalty, the sentence is decided by the jury and must be unanimous. In case of a hung jury during the penalty phase of the trial, the judge decides the sentence. The power of clemency belongs to the governor of Missouri after receiving a non-binding advice from the Board of Probation and Parole.

Executions are carried out by lethal injection or lethal gas, as determined by the department of corrections.

=== Capital crimes ===
First-degree murder is punishable by death when it involves one of the 17 following aggravating factors:

1. The offense was committed by a person with a prior record of conviction for murder in the first degree, or the offense was committed by a person who has one or more serious assaultive criminal convictions;
2. The murder was committed while the offender was engaged in the commission or attempted commission of another unlawful homicide;
3. The offender by his act of murder in the first degree knowingly created a great risk of death to more than one person by means of a weapon or device which would normally be hazardous to the lives of more than one person;
4. The offender committed the offense of murder in the first degree for himself or another, for the purpose of receiving money or any other thing of monetary value from the victim of the murder or another;
5. The murder was committed against a judicial officer, former judicial officer, prosecuting attorney or former prosecuting attorney, circuit attorney or former circuit attorney, assistant prosecuting attorney or former assistant prosecuting attorney, assistant circuit attorney or former assistant circuit attorney, peace officer or former peace officer, elected official or former elected official during or because of the exercise of his official duty;
6. The offender caused or directed another to commit murder in the first degree or committed murder in the first degree as an agent or employee of another person;
7. The murder was outrageously or wantonly vile, horrible or inhuman in that it involved torture, or depravity of mind;
8. The murder was committed against any peace officer, or fireman while engaged in the performance of his official duty;
9. The murder was committed by a person in, or who has escaped from, the lawful custody of a peace officer or place of lawful confinement;
10. The murder was committed for the purpose of avoiding, interfering with, or preventing a lawful arrest or custody in a place of lawful confinement, of himself or another;
11. The murder was committed while the defendant was engaged in the perpetration or was aiding or encouraging another person to perpetrate or attempt to perpetrate a felony of any degree of rape, sodomy, burglary, robbery, kidnapping, or any drug felony;
12. The murdered individual was a witness or potential witness in any past or pending investigation or past or pending prosecution, and was killed as a result of his status as a witness or potential witness;
13. The murdered individual was an employee of an institution or facility of the department of corrections of this state or local correction agency and was killed in the course of performing his official duties, or the murdered individual was an inmate of such institution or facility;
14. The murdered individual was killed as a result of the hijacking of an airplane, train, ship, bus or other public conveyance;
15. The murder was committed for the purpose of concealing or attempting to conceal any drug felony;
16. The murder was committed for the purpose of causing or attempting to cause a person to refrain from initiating or aiding in the prosecution of a drug felony;
17. The murder was committed during the commission of a crime which is part of a pattern of criminal street gang activity.

== Death row ==
Male death row offenders are housed at the Potosi Correctional Center (PCC), while female death row offenders are housed at the Women's Eastern Reception, Diagnostic and Correctional Center (WERDCC). Eastern Reception, Diagnostic and Correctional Center (ERDCC) houses the State of Missouri execution chamber.

The first person executed in the modern era was George Mercer who was executed at the Missouri State Penitentiary in Jefferson City, Missouri on January 6, 1989. The next 61 executions starting with Gerald Smith were done at the Potosi Correctional Center in Mineral Point, Missouri. Since April 2005, executions have been 25 miles east of Potosi at the Eastern Reception, Diagnostic and Correctional Center in Bonne Terre, Missouri. The first execution at Bonne Terre was #63 Donald Jones.

Until his death by natural causes on July 30, 2026, the longest-serving death row inmate was William Theodore Boliek Jr., who was convicted of the 1983 murder of Jody Harless. Boliek was originally scheduled to be executed in August 1997, but two days before his scheduled execution, Boliek was granted a stay of execution by Governor Mel Carnahan. However, Carnahan died in a plane crash in 2000 while the stay order remained effective. A court later ruled that only Carnahan could overturn the stay, effectively allowing Boliek to spend the remainder of his life in prison.

== See also ==
- List of people executed in Missouri (pre-1972)
- List of death row inmates in the United States § Missouri
- Crime in Missouri
- Law of Missouri
