= Cornealious Michael Anderson III =

American freed after rebuilding his life during sentencing error (born 1977)

Cornealious Michael "Mike" Anderson III (born c. 1977) is an American who was convicted of armed robbery in 2000 and sentenced to thirteen years in the Missouri state prison system. Due to a clerical error, his bond was not revoked when a warrant was issued for his arrest, and Anderson was not arrested because the Missouri Department of Corrections thought he was already in prison. The error was only discovered when he was scheduled to be released from prison in 2013 and he was arrested and required to serve his sentence. His arrest stirred national controversy, especially since he was a changed man by that time, and on appeal Anderson was set free in 2014.

== Robbery and conviction ==
On August 15, 1999 in St. Charles, Missouri, Anderson and a companion robbed a Burger King manager at gunpoint of approximately $2,000 while he was attempting to deposit the money in a night deposit box at a bank. A witness observed Anderson and his companion leaving in a car and reported the license plate number to the police. When the police ran the number, they found that it was registered to 22-year-old Cornealious Michael Anderson. The next day, St. Charles police found Anderson's car in a parking lot about a mile from the bank, but they did not catch him until two months later, when he was found hiding in his girlfriend's apartment.

In March 2000, Anderson's jury trial for armed robbery began. Although police never recovered a weapon, they searched Anderson's apartment and found an advertisement brochure for Beretta semiautomatic pistols. The St. Charles prosecutor in the case used the brochure to argue that although no weapon was found, Anderson owned a gun. The jury returned a verdict of guilty and Anderson was sentenced to a total of 13 years in prison.

== Conviction appeal and subsequent years ==
Ten months after the robbery, Anderson left Fulton Diagnostic Center on a $25,000 bond. His attorney appealed the conviction based on the inclusion of the Beretta brochure as evidence in the trial because it introduced unfair prejudice. The appeals judge, however, reaffirmed his conviction. His attorney then appealed to the Supreme Court of Missouri, which heard the case in 2002. Four of the seven justices voted to uphold the conviction.

After the Supreme Court of Missouri's ruling, his bond was to have been revoked and Anderson arrested to serve his 13-year sentence, but unknown errors in communication occurred and Missouri Department of Corrections believed he was already in prison. In 2004, Anderson filed another appeal based on inadequate legal representation at his trial. The appeal stated that Anderson was not in prison and it gave his current address at the time, but the Missouri Department of Corrections apparently did not notice this. Nothing happened with the appeal and for the next seven years Anderson went on with his life. During this time, he met his wife, LaQonna. They married in 2007. Anderson founded a company (Anderson Construction and Investment) and led a normal life. He registered his business, he voted, he renewed his driver's licence all using his full name and address. His lawyer at the time told him that the state of Missouri would discover their mistake and that it was their job to find him. He told Today that he began to think "Maybe they just wiped the slate clean".

== 2013 rearrest and appeal ==
On July 25, 2013, marshals arrested Anderson at his home. An arrest warrant had been issued for Anderson after it was discovered that he was not in prison when he was scheduled to be released. Up until that time, his wife had no knowledge of his prior robbery conviction. He was held in Southeast Correctional Center in Missouri.

On December 30, 2013, Anderson filed a writ of habeas corpus arguing that the 13-year delay in serving his sentence violated due process and that separating him from his family and the constructive life he had made for himself since he was convicted would amount to cruel and unusual punishment.

On April 15, 2014, Missouri Attorney General Chris Koster, his response to show cause order for Cornealious Anderson v. Ian Wallace, stated that the 13-year delay in serving his sentence was not cruel and unusual punishment. Koster wrote in the legal filing that "The United States Supreme Court has upheld much more severe sentences for much less serious crimes" and suggested that Anderson should instead file a petition with the Missouri Department of Corrections for 11.5 years credit for the time he was not in prison:

Anderson is in the wrong form of action and the wrong venue for the relief granted in Anderson v. Crawford. Rule 91 habeas corpus actions are generally limited to suits seeking immediate discharge from confinement, and the director of a department may only be sued in Cole County. But if Anderson re-files this matter as a declaratory judgment action and names the Director as the defendant, the Director consents to venue in this Court. If this Court accepts the facts as set out in this pleading, the Director takes no position on whether this Court should declare Anderson entitled to credit on his sentence from the time the opinion issued in his direct appeal. If the Court grants time served from the issuance of the opinion in 2002, Anderson would have served his 11.5-year mandatory-minimum prison term under Mo. Rev. Stat. 558.019 and 571.015 and be immediately eligible for parole consideration. pp. 5–6

Patrick Megaro, Anderson's attorney, replied that what is cruel and unusual is not the length of the sentence but delay in implementing the sentence due to errors by the Missouri Department of Corrections. Megaro also didn't "think that's a legally viable option [i.e., Koster's suggest legal course of action] ...The law is very clear, you don't get credit for time served in jail when you're out on bail."

== 2014 release ==
On April 17, 2014 Anderson's attorney filed a petition asking Missouri Governor Jay Nixon for clemency or to commute his sentence. Nixon had only granted clemency once while governor of Missouri.

On April 22, 2014 Anderson's attorney, after reconsidering and opting for the legal strategy suggested by Missouri Attorney General Chris Koster in his response to show cause order for Cornealious Anderson v. Ian Wallace, filed a petition for a declaratory judgment against the director of the Missouri Department of Corrections, George Lombardi. The petition argued that Anderson should receive credit for time served from May 25, 2000 to the present and that Anderson should be released from custody immediately. The petition for release was addition to the writ of habeas corpus filed in December 2013 and a request for executive clemency. A hearing date was set for May 5, 2014.

On May 5, 2014, Anderson was released from prison with credit for time served, making him a free man with no need for parole. The hearing was held in Charleston, Missouri, with Judge Terry Lynn Brown as the presiding judge. The hearing began with Anderson's attorney pleading his case by pointing out that Anderson had been his own parole officer since his conviction and that he had rehabilitated himself. When the attorney for the Department of Corrections spoke he raised little objection to what Anderson's attorney had said and asked the judge to consider Anderson's good behavior since 2000. Judge Brown then made his ruling first telling Anderson that:

You've been a good father. You've been a good husband. You've been a good taxpaying citizen of the state of Missouri. That leads me to believe that you are a good man and a changed man.

Judge Brown then told Anderson that he would receive credit for time served from 2000 when he was released on bond to 2013. This 13-year period satisfied his entire sentence and the judge announced to the courtroom that:

As such your sentence will be fully served and satisfied today.... Go home to your family, Mr. Anderson, and continue to be a good father, a good husband, a good taxpayer.... Good luck to you.

Attorney General Chris Koster, who had suggested this appeal to Anderson's attorney, released a statement after Judge Browns's ruling:

From the outset, I have proposed a solution that balances the seriousness of Mr. Anderson's crime with the mistake made by the criminal justice system and Mr. Anderson's lack of a criminal record over the past 13 years. Today's outcome appears to appropriately balance the facts as we understand them.

== Controversy ==
After the original article appeared in 2013, the victim of the robbery, Dennis (first name only), contacted the Riverfront Times and asked them to talk to him about how much the robbery damaged his life. He told the Riverfront Times that the robbery made him paranoid that the robbers would come after him. He quit his job, isolated himself, and his marriage eventually broke up. At about the same time, his daughter had also read the story in a high school class without knowing Dennis was the victim. She came home and told Dennis about the case and then asked him for his opinion about it. The Riverfront Times reported that he told his daughter that Anderson should be let go. Cornealious Michael Anderson's story was then broadcast on a February 14, 2014 episode of This American Life. During that episode, Jessica Lussenhop raised the question:

13 years without going to prison did exactly what you'd hope 13 years in prison will do for a person. Mike reformed, became a model citizen-- which raises the question, do we want to send him to prison? It will cost the state of Missouri about $20,000 a year to house and feed him.

After the episode aired on This American Life, the Riverfront Times and Anderson's attorney received emails requesting information on how they could advocate for his release. The Riverfront Times reported that a petition for his release was set up on Change.org. By May 5, 2014, the date of his release from prison, over 35,000 signatures were received by Change.org urging Attorney General Chris Koster of Missouri to release Anderson.

== Analysis ==
The dean of the University of Arizona College of Law, Marc Miller, told The Christian Science Monitor that "The judge's handling of the Anderson case is 'quirky' and a one-off given the unique circumstances." How American judges deal with cases where leniency or mercy seem appropriate are subject to regional, political, and gender differences in sentencing; judges in the South mete out the harshest sentences and those in the West, the most lenient. However, according to a 2014 Pew poll, Americans now prefer rehabilitation to prison time. According to Miller

We have a system sanction and punishment that has become excessive by historical and global standards...And when you see the potential of people [like Anderson] who have made terrible errors and caused harm and nonetheless succeed as a member of society, it makes you wonder how many other people can do that, and whether harsh sanctions remove opportunities for mercy and redemption.

Greg Zeman, in a commentary for Politix, argues that in American prison systems, rehabilitation is rare and that Anderson likely would not have been rehabilitated if he had gone to prison. According to James Gilligan, professor of psychiatry and law at New York University, the American prison system is a complete failure at rehabilitation. Two thirds of people released from prison reoffend and often by committing a more serious crime. Instead of rehabilitating, prisons train people to be more violent. According to Zeman, the failure to rehabilitate is a threat to society, but that it is a hard sell to convince those who focus on incarceration as punishment that incarceration should focus on rehabilitation. According to Gilligan, allowing prisoners access to education and obtaining a college degree is the only program that has ever been shown effective in reducing recidivism. However, such education programs are either viewed as too lenient or they are ineffectual in most prisons in the United States.

After the release of Anderson from prison, Jennifer Baker, writing in the Springfield News-Leader, also raised the issue of whether rehabilitation of criminals can be adequately accomplished in correction facilities. She notes several disadvantages a person faces after leaving prison that makes it more likely to return to prison. After spending time in prison, it is more difficult to find a job, estrangement of family is more likely, and child support continues to accrue while in prison. Moreover, people in prison often learn more about how to be a criminal than how to live successfully in the outside world. Anderson managed to rehabilitate himself without going through the prison system. According to Baker, Anderson's case suggests that there must be alternatives that can more successfully rehabilitate criminals and save public money.

Raj Jayadev, in a commentary for New America Media, considers Anderson's case to be an anomaly in the American criminal justice system that points to a fundamental problem. Locking people up is very expensive, crime rates are down, and mass incarceration disrupts families and communities. Jayadev asks "what is the societal value of locking up people for such significant amounts of time?" He argues that Mike Anderson is a case study, which illustrates that rehabilitation is possible and that it can be accomplished with limited incarceration. In Anderson's case, nothing would have been gained by incarcerating him for 13 years, but incarceration would have cost the state of Missouri 13 years of financial burden (i.e., Jayadev estimates the cost at $300,000) and Anderson may not have been rehabilitated when released. Jayadev notes that the approximately $300,000 it would have cost the state of Missouri to keep Anderson is not the only major cost that was avoided. Anderson's family and community would have lost his 13 years of contributions (Jayadev estimates Anderson's minimum monetary contributions to society at $108,161.30) and he would have emerged from prison with no job, no family, and no community for support. In all likelihood, according to Jayadev, he would have re-offended and ended back up in prison as almost 70% of people who are released from prison do.

Mandatory sentencing is at the heart of the problem on Jayadev's view. By removing judicial discretion with mandatory sentences, judges are not allowed to look at each case individually and make judgements about sentences that take into consideration the circumstances of the offense and future prospects for the person convicted. In Anderson's May 5, 2014 hearing, the judge was able to and did consider questions of circumstance, behavior, and future prospects. However, because of mandatory sentencing, these questions could not be considered when Anderson was originally sentenced to prison.

== Related cases ==
In 2000, Rene Lima-Marin was convicted of multiple counts of robbing a man at gunpoint in Colorado. He was not eligible for parole until 2098, but due to a clerical error, he was released in 2008, 90 years early. He became active in his church, married his former girlfriend, helped raise her son, and had another son with her. In January 2014, the state of Colorado realized their mistake and Lima-Marin, now 35, was taken back into custody. He was represented by the same attorney, Patrick Megaro, who represented Michael Anderson. Unlike Anderson, Lima-Marin's robbery victim has not forgiven him, and it is unclear whether Lima-Marin was aware of the clerical error when he was paroled. Lima-Marin was freed in 2017.

== 2014 wrongful arrest, dismissal of charges, and apology ==
On November 16, 2014, Anderson was stopped by St. Louis police officers as he was walking from a bar to get his vehicle. A few minutes earlier, a woman had her purse snatched and Anderson somewhat matched the description of the robber. When Anderson was taken to the scene by police officers, both the victim and a witness identified him as the robber. He was subsequently identified by them in a police lineup and charged with second degree robbery.

When Anderson was picked up by police, he had none of the woman's property on him and he told police that he had just come from a birthday party with his wife and 40 other people at a bar. Anderson's wife began investigating the incident and located surveillance video that showed that Anderson was at the party at the estimated time of the robbery. The Riverfront Times also investigated Anderson's alibi on November 18, 2014 by obtaining security footage from the bar showing that Anderson was at the bar at about the time he claimed.

On February 6, 2015 after reviewing surveillance video, Circuit Attorney Jennifer M. Joyce dropped all charges against Anderson. She issued an apology and stated that she had discussed the case with St. Louis Police Chief Sam Dotson and how police procedures could be improved to avoid such mistakes. Joyce stated "He [Dotson] told me he takes full accountability and he's going to go over it and make sure the proper training takes place".
