= Kansas City Reentry Center =

Prison in Missouri, United States

Coordinates: 39°06′24″N 94°35′51″W

- Interactive map of Kansas City Reentry Center
- Location: 651 Mulberry Street Kansas City, Missouri
- Status: open
- Security class: minimum
- Capacity: 430
- Opened: 2015
- Managed by: Missouri Department of Corrections

The Kansas City Reentry Center is a minimum security state prison located in downtown Kansas City, Missouri. In 2015, the state converted and renamed the facility from the prior Kansas City Community Release Center, which had released large numbers of parolees into the community.
