= Jessica Lussenhop =

American investigative journalist

- Born: 1980s
- Education: University of Pennsylvania; Columbia University
- Occupation: Journalist
- Known for: criminal justice articles
- Website: www.jessicalussenhop.com

Jessica Lussenhop is an American investigative journalist whose work has focused on corruption in politics alongside local issues and events. She has also covered major events, such as the Ferguson unrest and controversial murder cases like that of Cornealious Michael Anderson III for the podcast This American Life.

== Education and career ==
Lussenhop earned an M.S. in journalism at Columbia University before beginning writing stints in various alt-weekly publications, including the Santa Cruz Weekly. In 2010, she joined the Minneapolis City Pages as a staff writer, where she focused on investigating stories of political scandals, such as the corruption inside the standardized testing industry. Thanks to these works, Lussenhop was one of several journalists listed by Business Insider in 2011 for the category of "Best Young Writers on the Internet". She was also a runner up for a "Story of the Year" award in 2012 from the Minnesota Society of Professional Journalists.

Later in 2012, Lussenhop left to join the Riverfront Times as a staff writer, before advancing to managing editor in 2013. She still conducted on site investigative journalism, however, such as her interviews and features in Ferguson, Missouri during the major protests that began on August 10, 2014. In September 2014, she received an award from the Missouri Press Association for a sports feature she wrote regarding former inmates and the competitive handball games they played, along with a separate third place award on news features for her story on an armed robbery convict who was not arrested for thirteen years.

Besides writing, she was a fellow for the This American Life podcast. She became known in 2014 for her work on the Cornealious Michael Anderson III case. Lussenhop left the Riverfront Times in May 2015 to become a senior staff writer for BBC News in Washington. At her position there she has written about cases leading to Savanna's Act, such as the work of Lissa Yellowbird-Chase, one of many activists working to find missing and murdered Indigenous women. She has also covered women's rights and sexual harassment and violence cases, such as with a local housing program in Laurinburg, North Carolina.
