= Kelvin Malone =

American spree killer executed in Missouri (1961–1999)

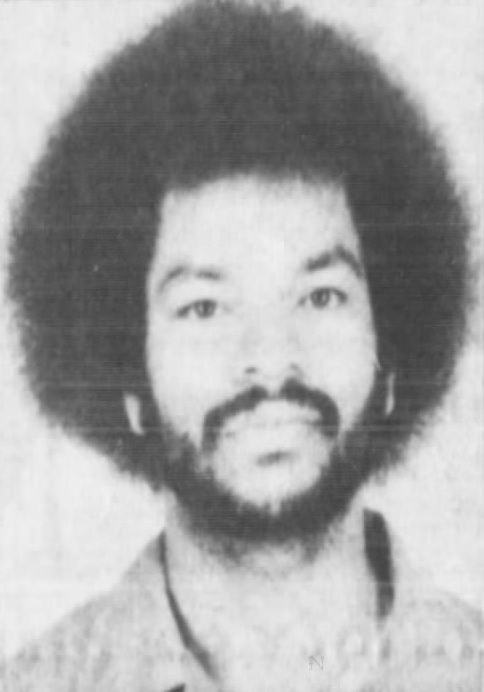
- Born: January 10, 1961; Seaside, California, U.S.
- Died: January 13, 1999 (aged 38); Potosi Correctional Center, Missouri, U.S.
- Status: Executed by lethal injection
- Convictions: California; First degree murder with special circumstances First degree murder Aggravated kidnapping Robbery; Missouri; First degree murder Robbery
- Penalty: California; Death (June 14, 1983) + Life imprisonment Missouri; Death (April 26, 1984)
- Accomplice: Michael Terry Crenshaw

Details
- Victims: 4+ (three convictions)
- Span of crimes: March 10 – 24, 1981
- Country: United States
- States: California and Missouri
- Weapons: Pipe; Two .25-caliber semi-automatic pistols: Galesi; Raven MP-25
- Imprisoned at: San Quentin State Prison

Kelvin Shelby Malone (January 10, 1961 – January 13, 1999) was an American spree killer who murdered at least four people in March 1981. Convicted of three murders but suspected in five; he was sentenced to death in both California and Missouri in 1983 and 1984 respectively. He remained on death row at San Quentin State Prison until he was extradited to Missouri in December 1998 to face execution. He was executed in January 1999 at the Potosi Correctional Center via lethal injection.

== Early life ==
Malone was born on January 10, 1961, in Seaside, California. He grew up near Monterey but had relatives in Missouri in the St. Louis area so lived there as well for some time during his youth. He attended Brentwood High School in St. Louis County, where he met Michael Terry Crenshaw. According to Crenshaw, when he first met Malone he was calm; however, when Malone returned from a trip to California in 1978, he was a different person and wanted to get involved in gang activity.

On February 15, 1979, Malone and another man, Andrew R. Armstong, robbed Missouri Court of Appeals judge George F. Gunn Jr. near his home in Brentwood. Armstrong pointed a loaded pistol at Gunn, but the pair stole only $4 in the robbery. Armstrong was sentenced to twenty years after fleeing the state in a stolen car. Malone was sentenced to seven years as he was considered the accomplice in the crime. Malone began his sentence on January 24, 1980, at the Missouri Intermediate Reformatory at the Algoa Correctional Center in Jefferson City.

Despite being sentenced to seven years, he served just under ten months and was paroled in November 1980. After being released on parole, Malone headed to California. In January 1981, he was convicted of burglary and grand theft in Monterey County. While he was waiting for sentencing for the crimes, he escaped.

== Murders ==
Malone's crime spree began on March 10, 1981, when he kidnapped 37-year-old Leroy Cambs in Santa Maria, California. Malone asked Cambs for a ride and then took out a gun and held him hostage. After forcing Cambs to drive him around for two hours, Malone ordered him into the trunk of his car in an underground parking lot in Los Angeles. Malone then drove Cambs around in the car for an hour before finally letting him go near a freeway in Long Beach.

On March 11, Malone robbed a gas station in Arroyo Grande and is suspected to have murdered a man on the same day in Merced County; however, he was never prosecuted for the killing, and authorities never released details of the murder. One week later, Malone took a bus trip back to St. Louis, where he reunited with Crenshaw.

On March 18, Malone shot and killed 62-year-old cab driver William Parr in St. Louis. Parr was found with a bullet in his head in a park near Crenshaw's home. According to Crenshaw, the pair then headed to Kansas City, Missouri, where they encountered 39-year-old James T. Rankin. On March 19, Rankin was kidnapped in the parking lot of a Denny's restaurant in downtown Kansas City. Malone and Crenshaw stole Rankin's car and took him in the trunk to a remote spot in the Mojave Desert just in or near California. According to Crenshaw, Malone took Rankin out of the trunk in the early hours of March 20 and shot him to death.

Hours later, the pair arrived at a gas station in Baker, California. The cashier, 55-year-old Myrtle Dee Benham, was kidnapped, robbed, sexually assaulted, and battered to death with a pipe by Malone. Her body was found eight days later in an abandoned shack just outside Daggett. At dawn on March 21, just north of Blythe, Malone shot 51-year-old Minnie Ola White to death after robbing her.

On March 24, Malone and Crenshaw were arrested in a stolen car in San Jose, California. The pair were carrying guns as well as credit cards belonging to White and Rankin. They were taken into custody and placed in separate jails in Southern California.

== Trials ==
On June 14, 1983, Malone was sentenced to death in California for the murder of Benham. He also received a life sentence for White's murder. His death sentence was upheld in 1988. On April 26, 1984, he was sentenced to death in Missouri for the murder of Parr. He was prosecuted by St. Louis County prosecutor Bob McCulloch. Malone chose to be imprisoned in California over Missouri, with a circuit judge agreeing to his request. He was returned to California and placed on death row at San Quentin State Prison.

Malone was never charged in the 1981 murder of Rankin, whose body was never found. Details of the murder of a man in Merced County were never released, and Malone was not charged in that killing either.

Crenshaw was convicted of first degree murder and sentenced to 25 years to life in prison for his role in the crime spree.

== Execution ==
On December 30, 1998, Malone was extradited from California to Missouri to face execution for the murder of William Parr. He was executed on January 13, 1999, at the Potosi Correctional Center via lethal injection. He was pronounced dead at 1:20 a.m. and did not offer any last words.

== See also ==
- Capital punishment in Missouri
- Capital punishment in the United States
- List of people executed in Missouri
- List of people executed in the United States in 1999
- Alfredo Prieto, sentenced to death in California but executed in a different state
- Glen Edward Rogers, sentenced to death in California but executed in a different state
