= Pope's Cafeteria =

Former cafeteria-restaurant chain

- Industry: Cafeteria-style restaurants
- Founded: 1933
- Founder: Harry Allen Pope
- Defunct: 1989
- Fate: Defunct
- Area served: Missouri

Pope's Cafeteria was an American cafeteria-style restaurant chain and institutional food-service company based in the St. Louis metropolitan area. The first public Pope's Cafeteria opened on Washington Avenue in St. Louis in 1933, although founder Harry Allen Pope had developed the company's food-production system while managing employee dining services for the International Shoe Company beginning in the 1910s. Pope's eventually operated cafeterias in downtown St. Louis and several suburban shopping centers, together with restaurants, factory dining rooms and food services for office buildings and retirement residences.

The company was known for inexpensive home-style meals prepared according to standardized commercial recipes. At its height during the late 1960s and early 1970s, Pope's employed hundreds of workers and reportedly prepared tens of thousands of meals each day. Changing dining habits, the decline of downtown St. Louis and increased competition from fast-food and takeout restaurants contributed to the contraction of the chain. The final Pope's Cafeteria, in Florissant, Missouri, closed in 1989.

== History ==
=== Origins ===
Harry Allen Pope (November 17, 1887 – December 9, 1984) was born in Weymouth, Massachusetts, in 1887. In 1911, he moved to St. Louis to work for the International Shoe Company. Pope became concerned about the quality and availability of meals for factory workers and developed a program through which employees could order hot lunches. The meals were initially delivered to workers and were later prepared in company dining rooms.

To ensure that large quantities of food could be prepared consistently, Pope converted household recipes into standardized commercial formulas. The recipes specified the amount of each ingredient, the number of expected portions and the required preparation procedure. The system was designed so that employees without extensive restaurant experience could reproduce the same dishes in multiple kitchens.

Within approximately ten years, kitchens operated for the International Shoe Company were serving an estimated 15,000 meals per day. Pope became the company's personnel manager and was elected president of the International Food Service Executives Association in 1929.

In 1933, Pope was offered control of the YWCA cafeteria at 3538 Washington Avenue. He financially backed his sons, Edwin Kempton Pope and Harry Howland Pope, who opened the first restaurant bearing the Pope's Cafeteria name at the site. A second location opened in 1936 at 804 Washington Avenue in a building formerly occupied by a Childs restaurant. Harry Pope then resigned from the International Shoe Company and entered the family restaurant business full time.

=== Wartime food service ===
During World War II, Pope's expanded into industrial food service. In 1942, the company obtained a contract to feed employees at the Amertorp torpedo plant at 3200 South Kingshighway. A contemporary advertisement promoted Pope's cafeterias and its industrial food-service operations during this period. The company eventually provided contract food service to more than 15 factories and other institutions in the St. Louis area.

=== Suburban expansion ===
Pope's began expanding into suburban shopping centers during the 1950s. In 1957, it opened a cafeteria at Northland Shopping Center, described by a retrospective history of the company as its first location in a suburban St. Louis shopping center.

In November 1958, the company opened Pope's Self Service Restaurant in the Siteman Office Building in Clayton, Missouri. Harry Pope based the restaurant's compact service arrangement on a system he had observed during a trip to Denmark. Customers ordering hot food received it directly from the kitchen, while the cashier was positioned in the center of the short serving line.

Additional Pope's Cafeterias opened at Westroads and South County shopping centers. A contemporary shopping-center advertisement listed Pope's Cafeteria alongside other South County tenants, including Seven Kitchens and the Round Table Restaurant.

By 1964, the company operated six Pope's Cafeterias and was preparing another downtown location at Seventh and Pine streets. That year, Pope's assumed operation of the Golden Falcon Cafeteria and the medieval-themed Round Table Restaurant at the Town and Country shopping complex at Page Avenue and Woodson Road.

By 1967, the company's operations employed more than 700 people and reportedly produced more than 30,000 meals per day. Its South County location was described as one of the company's most successful cafeterias.

=== Restaurant concepts and diversification ===
In 1969, Pope's opened a restaurant aboard the Becky Thatcher, a stern-wheel riverboat moored on the St. Louis riverfront. The restaurant's menu included channel catfish, steak and southern fried chicken. Pope's sold the riverboat restaurant to the Great River Steamboat Company in 1970.

Pope's continued opening cafeterias at suburban malls, including West County Center and Northwest Plaza. It also acquired three Holloway House cafeterias and operated several other restaurant concepts. These included the Round Table restaurants, Seven Kitchens, Briefeater sandwich and pastry shops and El Rancho, a self-service Mexican restaurant.

By the end of 1972, Pope's holdings reportedly included eleven public cafeterias, four Round Table restaurants, two Seven Kitchens restaurants, three Briefeaters, three retirement-residence food services and ten food-service operations in factories or office buildings. An employment advertisement for the company's West County Center operations sought workers for Pope's Cafeteria, Seven Kitchens and the Round Table Restaurant and emphasized that applicants did not need previous experience because the company provided training.

== Food and operating system ==
Pope's emphasized uniformity among its kitchens. Recipes prescribed specific ingredients, quantities, preparation methods, cooking instructions and numbers of servings. Harry Pope considered formulated recipes, employee training and adherence to company procedures the three essential parts of the system.

Mildred Hoppe, the company's director of food production, helped develop many of Pope's recipes. She was credited with creating Pope's nut torte, which used graham-cracker crumbs and nuts folded into a meringue-style base.

Other dishes associated with the cafeterias included chicken tetrazzini, baked haddock with dressing and mushroom sauce, cottage-cheese pie and banana ribbon cake.

In 1979, H. A. Pope & Sons published “No Experience Necessary”: Original Recipes from Pope's Cafeterias in St. Louis, written by Mildred Hoppe and Nancy M. Davis. An expanded fiftieth-anniversary edition was published in 1983.

== Desegregation ==
Pope's Cafeteria was among the St. Louis restaurant businesses approached by civil-rights activists seeking the desegregation of public dining facilities during the 1940s and 1950s. Members of the St. Louis chapter of the Congress of Racial Equality conducted interracial visits and demonstrations at restaurants that refused to serve Black customers.

Civil-rights organizer Margaret “Maggie” Dagen later recalled negotiating with Harry Pope about admitting Black customers to the cafeterias. According to Dagen's account, Pope initially suggested gradually admitting customers according to skin tone, a proposal that she rejected. By January 1961, a local CORE guide entitled Places to Eat—Open to All listed Pope's locations among St. Louis restaurants serving customers without regard to race.

== 1980 shooting ==
On October 23, 1980, police responded to the Pope's Cafeteria at West County Center in Des Peres, Missouri. Employees James E. Wood, Edna R. Ince, Carolyn R. Turner and Judy M. Cazaco were found shot inside the cafeteria's office. Wood, Ince and Turner died at the scene. Cazaco was taken to a hospital and died ten days later.

The cafeteria had been robbed, and money was missing from its safe. Initial newspaper coverage reported that three employees had been killed and a fourth critically wounded.

Police initially sought several men reportedly observed near the cafeteria and investigated witness descriptions of a vehicle leaving the shopping center. Des Peres had not recorded a homicide since the community's incorporation in 1934.

Maurice Oscar Byrd, a former pest-control employee who had serviced the cafeteria, was later charged with four counts of capital murder. Prosecutors presented evidence that Byrd knew the cafeteria's layout, left Missouri soon after the killings and spent a large amount of money after the robbery.

A St. Louis County jury convicted Byrd of all four murders on August 14, 1982. The jury recommended the death penalty, and Byrd was subsequently sentenced to death.

The Supreme Court of Missouri affirmed Byrd's convictions and death sentences in 1984. Byrd was executed by lethal injection at the Potosi Correctional Center on August 23, 1991.

== Decline and closure ==
Traditional cafeteria dining declined during the 1970s and 1980s as customers increasingly chose fast-food restaurants and takeout meals. Pope's was also affected by the decline of large industrial workplaces and by the movement of shopping and office employment away from downtown St. Louis.

On September 1, 1971, Food Management Systems acquired the original Pope's Cafeteria at 3538 Washington Avenue and renamed it Hasty House Cafeteria. The Pope's location at 804 Washington Avenue closed on June 27, 1980, after 44 years in business. During its peak decades, the restaurant had reportedly served as many as 8,000 meals per day, but customer traffic had declined by the 1970s.

Harry A. Pope died at his home in Clayton on December 9, 1984, at the age of 97. The final Pope's Cafeteria, located in Florissant, closed in 1989.

== Legacy ==
Pope's has been remembered as one of the principal locally owned cafeteria chains in twentieth-century St. Louis. Its history reflected the development of industrial food service, the expansion of suburban shopping centers and the eventual decline of cafeteria-style dining.

The company's cookbook and several surviving recipes continue to circulate through restaurant-history collections. Photographs of Pope's locations, including a 1953 image of the original Washington Avenue cafeteria, are held by the Missouri Historical Society.

== See also ==
- 1980 Pope's Cafeteria shooting
- Cuisine of St. Louis
- List of defunct restaurants of the United States
- Cafeteria
