= Lussenhop =

Lussenhop or Lüssenhop is a German surname. Notable people with the surname include:

- Doug Lussenhop (born 1973), American musician, video editor, and comedian
- Jessica Lussenhop, American investigative journalist
- Wyn Hoop (Winfried Lüssenhop, born 1936), German singer
