= Algoa Correctional Center =

Minimum security prison in Missouri

Coordinates: 38°33′09″N 92°03′09″W

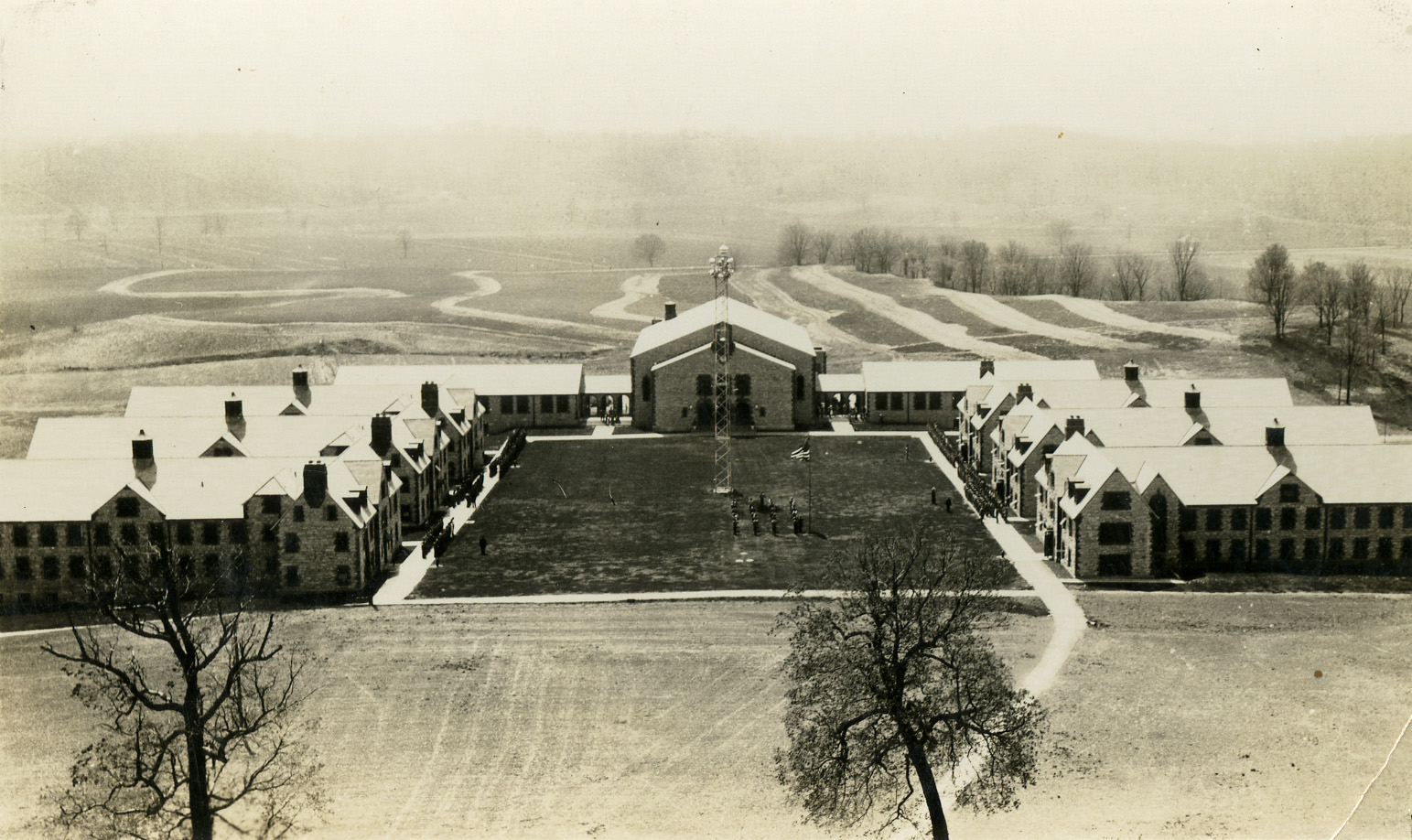
- The prison in 1934
- Interactive map of Algoa Correctional Center
- Location: 8501 No More Victims Road Jefferson City, Missouri
- Status: open
- Security class: Minimum
- Capacity: 1635
- Opened: 1932
- Managed by: Missouri Department of Corrections

Algoa Correctional Center (ACC) is a minimum security prison in Jefferson City, Missouri operated by the Missouri Department of Corrections. It houses approximately 1600 inmates, with a staff of approximately 470. It is located at 8501 No More Victims Road, Jefferson City, MO 65101.

Algoa Correctional Center is the only male institution in the state of Missouri that offers the IFI Program. The IFI program is also in the Women's Eastern Reception, Diagnostic and Correctional Center.

On May 12, 2025, a class action lawsuit was filed on the basis of cruel and unusual punishment due to the dangerously high temperatures in Algoa's housing units, especially for solitary confinement chambers. Air conditioning at the facility is limited to staff-only areas.

== Notable inmates ==
- Bobby Bostic, transferred from Jefferson City Correctional Center in 2021 to serve the final year of his sentence.
- Chuck Berry served time in Algoa from 1944 to 1947.
