= Gary Muehlberg =

American serial killer (born 1949)

- Born: Gary Randall Muehlberg; February 27, 1949 (age 77); St. Louis, Missouri, U.S.
- Other name: "The Package Killer"
- Conviction: Murder (x5)
- Penalty: Life imprisonment without parole (x5)

Details
- Victims: 5–6+
- Span of crimes: 1990–1993
- Country: United States
- State: Missouri
- Date apprehended: March 27, 1993
- Imprisoned at: Potosi Correctional Center, Potosi, Missouri

Gary Randall Muehlberg (born February 27, 1949), known as The Package Killer, is an American serial killer who killed at least four women and one man in and around St. Louis, Missouri, from 1990 to 1993. Originally convicted and sentenced to life imprisonment for the murder of a man in 1993, he was linked to the murders of four prostitutes via DNA in 2022, to which he pleaded guilty and received additional life terms.

== Early life ==
Gary Randall Muehlberg was born on February 27, 1949, in St. Louis, Missouri, one of three children born to William and Christina Muehlberg. He grew up in a prosperous environment, as both parents took good care of their children and his father, a WWII veteran, served on the Board of Governors in several districts from 1955 to 1957. In 1966, William Muehlberg accepted a high-paid position at Gulf Oil, after which the family moved to Salina, Kansas.

After graduating from school in 1968, Gary and his older brother Ronald were drafted into the Army to fight in Vietnam. Gary did not see combat and was stationed around various military bases on American soil, while his brother was killed in action on August 21, 1968, during one of the battles in the Mekong Delta. Upon completing his service, Muehlberg returned to his parents' home, and in June 1970, he married his highschool sweetheart, with whom he had one son shortly after their wedding.

=== First crimes ===
In February 1972, Muehlberg was arrested for allegedly robbing and raping an 18-year-old girl in Salina. The victim told police that he had broken into her home while she was alone and then raped her at knifepoint, and after he had finished, the rapist stole some money and valuables before fleeing. Shortly after his arrest, Muehlberg was ordered to undergo a forensic psychiatric examination, where he was found to be insane.

At trial, he was convicted of the robbery charge, but was found not guilty by reason of insanity. After spending a month in the county jail, Muehlberg was transferred to a veterans' hospital in Topeka, where he underwent treatment for several months. When he was considered to no longer be a threat to society, Muehlberg was released in December of that year, whereupon he left Kansas and returned to St. Louis. On January 5, 1973, his father died from a heart attack.

Later that month, Muehlberg was arrested again, this time for assaulting a 14-year-old girl. The victim told police that he had knocked on the door of her house, ostensibly asking to use the telephone. After he got inside, he threatened her with a knife, bound and gagged her, and then locked her in the bathroom. He then attempted to search the house for valuables, but was forced to flee after a car pulled up to the house. After the 14-year-old was rescued, she reported the incident to the police and later identified him as her assailant from a series of photographs, resulting in his arrest.

At his trial, his attorneys requested that he be acquitted on the grounds of insanity, but this time the medical examiner found him sane. As a result, he was convicted of assault and sentenced to five years imprisonment. Shortly after his conviction, his wife divorced him, and Muehlberg permanently lost contact with her and his son. In 1977, he was paroled.

=== Downward spiral ===
After his release, Muehlberg enrolled at the Central Methodist College, where he studied psychology. After graduating, he attended graduate school at the University of Central Missouri, and in 1980, he married for the second time and had two additional children. During this period, he worked as a teacher for the Hubert Wheeler School, but soon lost interest and quit.

In the following years, Muehlberg experienced employment problems and financial hardship, resorting to doing low-skilled labor and repairing houses across St. Louis. He also worked as a repairman for the Moolah Shrine Center, maintaining various structures on the grounds. His relationship with his second wife deteriorated rapidly, and they divorced in 1986 - similarly to his first wife, Muehlberg lost contact with her and took no part in raising his children.

In the late 1980s, Muehlberg gave up on legal ways of making money and started dealing drugs. He built a fake wall in the basement of his house with bricks, behind which he set up a cache where he stored dozens of kilos of marijuana. He spent most of his free time at one of the fast-food restaurants near his home, where he soon made many acquaintances. During this period of time, Muehlberg started frequently using the services of prostitutes, which he invited to his home. He was known as a manipulator and a liar, and was generally disliked by the local community.

In the early 1990s, Muehlberg got into the business of buying and selling used cars. He attempted to get a number of his friends and acquaintances involved in this business, but was unsuccessful in this endeavor.

== Murders ==
=== "Package Killer" murders ===
On March 22, 1990, 18-year-old Robin J. Mihan went missing. A mother-of-two with a drug addiction, she worked as a prostitute alongside a friend named Faye Sparks. In order to avoid getting into trouble, the pair always had to know where the other one was, wrote down each other's car license plate numbers and never got into the same car. According to Mihan's brother, on the day of her disappearance she disregarded those rules due to her addiction and got into a car that was out of Sparks' view. Under questioning, Muehlberg stated that after kidnapping Mihan, he attacked, beat and stabbed her several times, including in the head. He then drove back to his house and locked her in his basement for the next several days, where he sexually assaulted and tortured her in various ways before strangling her. Four days later, Muehlberg dumped her corpse along a highway northwest of St. Louis, in Silex. The body was found tied between two mattresses.

On October 4, 1990, the body of a woman was found wrapped in a plastic trash can in Maryland Heights. An investigation revealed that the victim had been bound with Conex electrical cable, which was used by a number of construction companies in St. Louis to run electrical wiring during apartment and home renovations. Because a fragment of the same cable had been used to bundle the mattresses between which Mihan's body was found, police linked the two murders. After determining that the trash bags were manufactured by a company called Beiner Hardware, police started interviewing employees and obtained a list of regular customers - Muehlberg was never suspected. In March 1991, coroners used dental X-Rays to identify this victim as 27-year-old Brenda Pruitt, who went missing on May 5, 1990.

On June 11, the body of 40-year-old Donna Reitmeyer was found inside a dumpster, all wrapped up in plastic garbage bags. She was last seen on a street in St. Louis on her way to meet an acquaintance. Reitmeyer was a mother of three, but lived in poverty and developed a drug addiction, due to which she resorted to prostitution and was repeatedly arrested for it. An exact cause of death could not be determined, but it was concluded that it was the result of a homicide.

On September 4, 21-year-old Sandy Little was reported missing. Unlike previous victims, she was not a prostitute, but had spent most of her life in foster homes and orphanages, running away from school quite often. Shortly before her death, she had been living with her fiancé (who was jailed for a misdemeanor at the time of her disappearance), with whom she had one son. Her skeletal remains were found on February 17, 1991, on the side of the I-70, near O'Fallon. After committing the murder, Muehlberg placed the girl's body in a wooden box before disposing of it. Dog hair was found on the bodies of Mihan, Pruitt and Little, and when queried about this, Muehlberg admitted that he did indeed have a dog at his home during the 1990s.

During interrogations following his identification as "The Package Killer", Muehlberg claimed that he had picked up a young woman in his car in south St. Louis sometime in 1990 or 1991. He could not recall the order in which he had killed his victims, but remembered that he had kept this particular victim's remains in his basement for the longest period. He originally kept them in an oversized cardboard box, but after it started deteriorating due to decomposition, he bought a steel barrel and stuffed them inside. He then claimed that he dumped the barrel near a self-service car wash, "Ram Jet", just outside Berkeley. During an interview with the car wash owner's son, he stated that such a barrel had indeed been found, but in the nearby town of Pagedale, where his father had another car wash. An officer from the Pagedale Police Department confirmed that such a barrel had indeed been found, but it was unknown what happened to it. When confronted with this information, Muehlberg continued to insist that he had dumped the barrel in Berkeley, not Pagedale.

=== Murder of Kenneth Atchison ===
In early 1993, Muehlberg was advertising a 1989 Cadillac Fleetwood for sale when he was approached by an acquaintance, 57-year-old Kenneth "Doc" Atchison, who wanted to purchase it. On February 8, 1993, Atchison went to Muehlberg's home in Bel-Ridge with $6,000, after which he went missing. Since a number of relatives and friends were aware that he had wanted to buy a car from Muehlberg, Atchison's brother Vernon reported his disappearance to the police, telling them that he had seen him at a local fast-food restaurant with a gun and a large wad of cash. The police were also contacted by a friend of Muehlberg, who in turn stated that he had been offered money to make a large wooden box, about two meters in length, that could be used as a coffin.

About six weeks after Atchison disappeared, another acquaintance of Muehlberg named Ron Silancas contacted authorities. He claimed that Gary had tried to hire him for some unloading work to remove items from his basement, which he wanted to be moved to a nearby landfill. According to Silancas' claims, the basement contained a crudely made coffin made of plywood sheets, with male socks sticking out of it. He had supposedly been offered a 1984 Mercury Cougar in exchange for the job, but Silancas declined. After receiving this information, officers obtained a search warrant and went to arrest Muehlberg, but by that time he had already fled the state. A search of the home led to the location of Atchison's body, whose hands had been handcuffed. An autopsy determined that he had been asphyxiated to death, but was repeatedly tortured, stabbed and shot while still alive.

=== Arrest, trial, and imprisonment ===
After a brief manhunt, Muehlberg was located and detained in Wayne County, Illinois on March 27, 1993. When questioned, he admitted the fact that he knew the victim and that his body was in his basement, but refused to admit he had killed him. Muehlberg instead attempted to place the blame on Chuck Nichols, a former employer who supposedly also wanted to buy the car and then murdered Atchison during an argument. To support his claims, Muehlberg indicated that he later successfully sold the car to Nichols and that the murder weapon had been hidden at the home of Nichols' brother, Wilton. When Wilton Nichols' home was searched, officers located a .22 caliber handgun that was confirmed to be the murder weapon, additionally revealing that Muehlberg's car was being driven by Nichols' daughter.

Suspicion against the Nichols brothers increased after it was established that they were involved in drug trafficking, for which they were eventually tried and convicted. However, only Muehlberg was charged in Atchison's murder, and he was found guilty in September 1995. In November of that year, he was sentenced to life imprisonment without parole. Muehlberg's attorneys attempted to appeal his conviction, but it was rejected in 1999. During his subsequent years of detention, he was regarded as an exemplary prisoner who was never reprimanded for any violations.

== Link to previous murders ==
For almost three decades, the murders attributed to the so-called "Package Killer" went unsolved. In 2008, the cases were reopened due to the advancements of DNA, and in March 2022, authorities got a hit on Muehlberg for one of the murders. Shortly afterwards, he was interviewed and expressed willingness to cooperate with authorities, fully confessing culpability to most of the murders and confessing to the murder of a Jane Doe whose identity remains unknown.

In exchange for his cooperation and the fact that he's suffering from kidney failure, prosecutors agreed not to seek the death penalty. Over the next several months, Muehlberg pleaded guilty to each individual murder, receiving four additional life terms without parole.

As of March 2025, he remains incarcerated at the Potosi Correctional Center in Potosi.

== See also ==
- List of serial killers in the United States
