= Vandalia, Missouri =

City in Audrain and Ralls counties in Missouri, United States

- City
- City of Vandalia
- Downtown Vandalia Post Office Vandalia Historic Church Vandalia Hotel

- Logo

- Location of Vandalia, Missouri
- Coordinates: 39°18′29″N 91°29′21″W
- Country: United States
- State: Missouri
- Counties: Audrain, Ralls

Area
  - Total: 2.25 sq mi (5.82 km^{2})
  - Land: 2.24 sq mi (5.81 km^{2})
  - Water: 0.0039 sq mi (0.01 km^{2})
- Elevation: 764 ft (233 m)

Population (2020)
  - Total: 3,553
  - Estimate (2023): 3,464
  - Density: 1,583.6/sq mi (611.44/km^{2})
- Time zone: UTC-6 (Central (CST))
  - Summer (DST): UTC-5 (CDT)
- ZIP code: 63382
- Area code: 573
- FIPS code: 29-75688
- GNIS feature ID =: 2397120
- Website: www.vandaliamo.net

Vandalia is a city in northeastern Audrain County and extending into southeastern Ralls County in Missouri, United States. The population was 3,553 at the 2020 census, which includes about 1,000 prisoners incarcerated at the prison located within the city limits.

The Audrain County portion of Vandalia is part of the Mexico Micropolitan Statistical Area, while the Ralls County portion is part of the Hannibal Micropolitan Statistical Area.

== History ==
Vandalia was laid off by Aaron McPike and Judge Harmen Caldwell in 1870 and platted in 1871. The city was named after Vandalia, Illinois. Aaron McPike transferred the lumber used to build the first homes from Louisiana, Missouri. A post office called Vandalia has been in operation since 1871.

The Lincoln School was listed on the National Register of Historic Places in 1996.

== Demographics ==
Historical population
Census	Pop.	Note	%±
1880	501		—
1890	979		95.4%
1900	1,168		19.3%
1910	1,595		36.6%
1920	2,158		35.3%
1930	2,450		13.5%
1940	2,672		9.1%
1950	2,624		−1.8%
1960	3,055		16.4%
1970	3,160		3.4%
1980	3,170		0.3%
1990	2,683		−15.4%
2000	2,529		−5.7%
2010	3,899		54.2%
2020	3,553		−8.9%
U.S. Decennial Census

=== 2020 census ===
As of the 2020 census, Vandalia had a population of 3,553. The median age was 37.6 years. 16.4% of residents were under the age of 18 and 14.5% of residents were 65 years of age or older. For every 100 females there were 46.6 males, and for every 100 females age 18 and over there were 38.8 males age 18 and over.

0.0% of residents lived in urban areas, while 100.0% lived in rural areas.

There were 1,012 households in Vandalia, of which 29.9% had children under the age of 18 living in them. Of all households, 39.3% were married-couple households, 19.6% were households with a male householder and no spouse or partner present, and 31.2% were households with a female householder and no spouse or partner present. About 32.4% of all households were made up of individuals and 16.1% had someone living alone who was 65 years of age or older.

There were 1,203 housing units, of which 15.9% were vacant. The homeowner vacancy rate was 4.3% and the rental vacancy rate was 11.0%.

Racial composition as of the 2020 census
Race	Number	Percent
White	3,017	84.9%
Black or African American	299	8.4%
American Indian and Alaska Native	16	0.5%
Asian	12	0.3%
Native Hawaiian and Other Pacific Islander	0	0.0%
Some other race	39	1.1%
Two or more races	170	4.8%
Hispanic or Latino (of any race)	89	2.5%

=== 2010 census ===
As of the census of 2010, there were 3,899 people, 1,105 households, and 671 families living in the city. The population density was 1,740.6 inhabitants per square mile (672.0/km^{2}). There were 1,295 housing units at an average density of 578.1 per square mile (223.2/km^{2}). The racial makeup of the city was 81.4% White, 15.7% African American, 0.4% Native American, 0.4% Asian, 0.3% from other races, and 1.8% from two or more races. Hispanic or Latino of any race were 1.8% of the population.

There were 1,105 households, of which 29.0% had children under the age of 18 living with them, 40.9% were married couples living together, 15.1% had a female householder with no husband present, 4.7% had a male householder with no wife present, and 39.3% were non-families. 34.3% of all households were made up of individuals, and 16.1% had someone living alone who was 65 years of age or older. The average household size was 2.24 and the average family size was 2.82.

The median age in the city was 37 years. 15% of residents were under the age of 18; 10.3% were between the ages of 18 and 24; 38.4% were from 25 to 44; 24% were from 45 to 64; and 12.3% were 65 years of age or older. The gender makeup of the city was 29.5% male and 70.5% female.

=== 2000 census ===
As of the census of 2000, there were 2,529 people, 1,176 households, and 702 families living in the city. The population density was 1,117.8 inhabitants per square mile (431.6/km^{2}). There were 1,343 housing units at an average density of 593.6 per square mile (229.2/km^{2}). The racial makeup of the city was 86.91% White, 10.76% African American, 0.47% Asian, 0.20% from other races, and 1.66% from two or more races. Hispanic or Latino of any race were 0.79% of the population.

There were 1,176 households, out of which 25.6% had children under the age of 18 living with them, 44.3% were married couples living together, 12.0% had a female householder with no husband present, and 40.3% were non-families. 37.5% of all households were made up of individuals, and 20.2% had someone living alone who was 65 years of age or older. The average household size was 2.15 and the average family size was 2.81.

In the city, the population was spread out, with 23.7% under the age of 18, 7.0% from 18 to 24, 24.1% from 25 to 44, 23.2% from 45 to 64, and 22.0% who were 65 years of age or older. The median age was 42 years. For every 100 females, there were 86.1 males. For every 100 females age 18 and over, there were 84.6 males.

The median income for a household in the city was $25,213, and the median income for a family was $33,819. Males had a median income of $26,356 versus $16,114 for females. The per capita income for the city was $14,859. About 14.6% of families and 18.0% of the population were below the poverty line, including 33.7% of those under age 18 and 6.7% of those age 65 or over.

== Geography ==
Vandalia is located on US Route 54 in the northeastern corner of Audrain County about 15 miles west of Bowling Green.

Vandalia is about 27 miles from the Mississippi River, 30 miles southwest of Hannibal and 100 miles northwest of St. Louis. The Gateway Western Railroad line runs through the town. U.S. Route 54 connects Vandalia with Illinois to the east and Jefferson City and the Lake of the Ozarks to the south and west.

According to the United States Census Bureau, the city has a total area of 2.25 square miles (5.83 km^{2}), of which, 2.24 square miles (5.80 km^{2}) is land and 0.01 square miles (0.03 km^{2}) is water.

=== Climate ===
Climate data for Vandalia, Missouri (1991–2020 normals, extremes 1911–present)
Month	Jan	Feb	Mar	Apr	May	Jun	Jul	Aug	Sep	Oct	Nov	Dec	Year
Record high °F (°C)	77 (25)	81 (27)	88 (31)	92 (33)	96 (36)	105 (41)	108 (42)	106 (41)	108 (42)	93 (34)	88 (31)	74 (23)	108 (42)
Mean maximum °F (°C)	60.0 (15.6)	65.0 (18.3)	75.3 (24.1)	83.0 (28.3)	87.0 (30.6)	92.4 (33.6)	95.2 (35.1)	95.6 (35.3)	90.9 (32.7)	84.3 (29.1)	72.6 (22.6)	63.7 (17.6)	97.4 (36.3)
Mean daily maximum °F (°C)	35.7 (2.1)	40.8 (4.9)	52.2 (11.2)	64.2 (17.9)	73.6 (23.1)	82.5 (28.1)	86.4 (30.2)	85.1 (29.5)	78.6 (25.9)	66.6 (19.2)	52.5 (11.4)	40.5 (4.7)	63.2 (17.3)
Daily mean °F (°C)	27.1 (−2.7)	31.5 (−0.3)	41.8 (5.4)	53.1 (11.7)	63.4 (17.4)	72.5 (22.5)	76.4 (24.7)	74.7 (23.7)	67.2 (19.6)	55.2 (12.9)	42.6 (5.9)	32.1 (0.1)	53.1 (11.7)
Mean daily minimum °F (°C)	18.5 (−7.5)	22.1 (−5.5)	31.4 (−0.3)	42.0 (5.6)	53.2 (11.8)	62.6 (17.0)	66.4 (19.1)	64.3 (17.9)	55.8 (13.2)	43.9 (6.6)	32.6 (0.3)	23.7 (−4.6)	43.0 (6.1)
Mean minimum °F (°C)	−1.2 (−18.4)	3.7 (−15.7)	13.8 (−10.1)	28.1 (−2.2)	39.5 (4.2)	51.5 (10.8)	56.9 (13.8)	55.4 (13.0)	41.8 (5.4)	29.4 (−1.4)	17.3 (−8.2)	5.7 (−14.6)	−4.8 (−20.4)
Record low °F (°C)	−24 (−31)	−16 (−27)	−12 (−24)	18 (−8)	29 (−2)	35 (2)	45 (7)	40 (4)	32 (0)	20 (−7)	−5 (−21)	−24 (−31)	−24 (−31)
Average precipitation inches (mm)	2.20 (56)	2.27 (58)	3.35 (85)	4.23 (107)	4.97 (126)	5.07 (129)	4.59 (117)	3.37 (86)	3.69 (94)	2.76 (70)	2.73 (69)	2.04 (52)	41.27 (1,048)
Average precipitation days (≥ 0.01 in)	6.4	6.5	9.2	10.2	11.6	9.8	8.1	7.2	7.5	8.7	6.7	7.2	99.1
Source: NOAA

== Government and infrastructure ==
The Women's Eastern Reception, Diagnostic and Correctional Center, a women's prison of the Missouri Department of Corrections, is located in Vandalia.

The United States Postal Service operates the Vandalia Post Office.

== Education ==
Van-Far R-I School District operates one elementary school, one middle school and Van-Far Jr./Sr. High School.

Vandalia has a lending library, a branch of the Mexico-Audrain Library District.

== See also ==
- List of cities in Missouri
