= 1987 St. Louis National Supermarkets shooting =

1987 mass shooting in St. Louis, Missouri

1987 St Louis National Supermarket shooting
- Location: St. Louis, Missouri, U.S.
- Date: September 4, 1987
- Attack type: Mass shooting, mass murder, armed robbery
- Weapons: .38-caliber revolver; Shotgun
- Deaths: 5
- Injuries: 2
- Charges: Jennings: Life imprisonment without parole Blankenship: Life imprisonment with parole
- Convicted: Jennings: First-degree murder; Blankenship: Second-degree murder

On September 4, 1987, at a local National Supermarkets store in St. Louis, Missouri, two gunmen, Donnie Blankenship (born January 29, 1962) and Marvin Jennings (born December 3, 1960), entered the supermarket to commit robbery after the store closed. Both Blankenship and Jennings held seven supermarket employees at gunpoint before shooting all of them, resulting in the deaths of five employees and the remaining two injured. Subsequently, both Jennings and Blankenship were arrested and charged with multiple counts of first-degree murder. Out of the two, Jennings was found guilty of first-degree murder and sentenced to life without parole after the jury spared him the death penalty (which the prosecution sought). Blankenship was also sentenced to life in prison for second-degree murder.

== Murders ==
On September 4, 1987, a mass shooting broke out inside a local National Supermarkets store in St. Louis, Missouri, resulting in the deaths of five employees and another two injured.

On that day, shortly after the supermarket was closed, seven employees were present at the supermarket when the shooting occurred. Two gunmen, 25-year-old Donnie Blankenship and 27-year-old Marvin Jennings, entered the store under the disguise of cleaners and held all the seven employees at gunpoint. One of the gunmen entered the office of 30-year-old store manager Harold Meyer, pointed a revolver at Meyer and ordered Meyer to open the safe. Meyer attempted to do so but was unsuccessful, causing the gunman to strike him in the head, which split open his head. 34-year-old stock manager Michael Beam was similarly beaten after he failed another attempt to open the safe, and after 49-year-old head night checker Rose Brown successfully opened the safe on a third try, about $4,000 or $5,000 in cash (which were bound in stacks) were packed in a plastic bag and handed over to the gunmen.

Afterwards, the two gunmen rounded up the seven employees, and also took away the gun of 27-year-old security guard David Spahn. The seven employees were made to lie down on their stomachs, and the gunmen shot all seven of them in the head several times, before they left the store. Meyer was one of the only two employees to survive the shooting; the other survivor was 32-year-old service manager Richard Fortson. The remaining five employees – Beam, Brown, Spahn, 27-year-old service manager Kenneth Bass and 16-year-old bag boy Michael Marr – died at the scene.

Despite his two gunshot wounds, Meyer was able to reach a telephone after playing dead for 2-3 minutes and filed a police report. The police arrived to find the bodies thereafter, and Police Captain Jack Titone labelled it as "the most brutal killing" he came across as a police officer. The shootings brought shock to the community when it was first revealed, and hundreds showed up in a huge crowd to have a look at the crime scene. Most of the residents knew the victims, and they were described to be good people.

The funerals of the five victims were held throughout the week after the shootings. The store was also closed on September 11, 1987, to allow employees to attend the funerals of Marr and Bass, whose funerals were the last two to be held. Over 1,000 people turned up at the funeral wake of Marr.

== Arrests and investigations ==
After the police investigations began, both Marvin Jennings and Donnie Blankenship were not immediately arrested for the murders. Instead, the police first arrested four men. Two of the suspects were brothers: 19-year-old Ricky Williams and 23-year-old Reginald Williams, and the other two were 27-year-old Anthony Benn and 36-year-old Charles Wright, the latter who was out on parole after a 15-year sentence for a 1981 robbery conviction at the time of the shooting. Ricky was charged with five counts of second-degree murder while the rest were each charged with five counts of first-degree murder, seven of armed criminal action, two of first-degree assault, two of first-degree robbery and one of first-degree burglary.

About a week after their arrests, the Williams brothers were released after the police found lack of evidence against them and multiple testimonies from witnesses who supported an alibi of the brothers. Subsequently, Wright and Benn were also released. It was alleged by some of the four men that they were being abused during police investigations and forced to confess under duress.

The case remained unsolved for several months until November 1987, when a gun confiscated from two men during a routine traffic stop was found to belong to David Spahn, the security guard murdered in the shooting. One of the passengers was coincidentally Blankenship's uncle, Jimmy Kennedy. Kennedy initially claimed he had purchased the gun off the street, but later admitted that Blankenship had given it to him. Crucially, Spahn's revolver was identified as the same murder weapon used in the killings. Additionally, Blankenship's brother testified that he saw Blankenship bringing back a gun and $1,200 in one-dollar bills, which Blankenship claimed to have robbed from a "dope house", when they were in fact the loot taken from the shooting. Further investigation revealed evidence that Blankenship paid for car repairs with a large amount of one-dollar bills, some of which were wrapped in stacks, similar to the money taken during the robbery.

This breakthrough resulted in the arrests of both Jennings and Blankenship during the same month of Kennedy's arrest, and both men were charged with multiple counts of first-degree murder and robbery, assault and armed criminal action. Blankenship was released in early March 1988 on a $10,000 bond. The pair were formally indicted on March 25, 1988, for the mass shooting, and the police sought to arrest Blankenship, who remained free at this point.

== Trial proceedings ==
Marvin Jennings

Marvin Jennings was the first robber out of the pair to stand trial for the supermarket massacre, and his trial began on August 29, 1988.

On September 9, 1988, a St. Louis County jury found Jennings guilty of all five counts of first-degree murder and another 11 charges, pertaining to robbery, assault and armed criminal action. The prosecution sought the maximum sentence of death for all the first-degree murder charges against Jennings, citing that he was a "cold-blooded, murderous animal" who committed a heinous crime. Apart from the death penalty, the offence of first-degree murder also carried the minimum sentence of life imprisonment without the possibility of parole.

On September 14, 1988, the jury recommended that Jennings should be sentenced to life without parole, thus sparing Jennings the death sentence. Reportedly, Jennings's family were not satisfied with the verdict because they believed he did not commit the murders. In accordance to the jury's recommendation, Judge Thomas C. Mummert sentenced Jennings to five consecutive life terms without parole for all five counts of first-degree murder, in addition to sentences of 15 years for assault and life for robbery and criminal action, all of which would also run consecutively.

Donnie Blankenship

Donnie Blankenship was the second of the duo to be put on trial for his role behind the shooting on April 10, 1989. Similarly, the prosecution sought to have Blankenship convicted of first-degree murder and also requested the death penalty for Blankenship like they did at Jennings's trial.

On April 23, 1989, the jury found Blankenship guilty of five counts of second-degree murder, one count of robbery, one count of receiving stolen property and one count of receiving a stolen weapon. He was also acquitted of eight counts of armed criminal action and two counts of assault. The verdict allowed Blankenship to avoid the death penalty like Jennings, as the charge of second-degree murder did not carry the death penalty in contrast to first-degree murder. The highest penalty available for second-degree murder was life imprisonment.

On June 9, 1989, St. Louis Circuit Court Judge Thomas F. McGuire sentenced Blankenship to five consecutive life sentences, in addition to 55 years. Although Blankenship's case could still be periodically reviewed by the state parole board, his sentence effectively meant that he could only be eligible for parole after completing more than 100 years of his sentence.

== Appeals and imprisonment ==
On July 30, 1991, Marvin Jennings's appeal against his conviction and sentence was rejected by the Missouri Court of Appeals.

On April 21, 1992, the Missouri Supreme Court dismissed Donnie Blankenship's appeal.

On July 18, 2019, Jennings's petition for a writ of habeas corpus was denied by Washington County Judge Troy Hyde. The judge dismissed Jennings's claims of innocence and added that his allegations of prosecutorial misconduct and unlawful sentencing were "essentially attacks on evidentiary rulings by the trial court that have already been litigated in the ordinary course of review."

As of 2025, both Marvin Jennings and Donnie Blankenship are incarcerated at the Potosi Correctional Center.

== Aftermath ==
The 1987 St. Louis National Supermarkets shooting was known to be one of the worst, in addition to being the most heinous and deadliest case of mass murder to happen in the history of St. Louis since it first occurred, with its notoriety surpassing even that of the 1980 Pope's Cafeteria shooting, where Maurice Oscar Byrd shot and killed four people while robbing a local cafeteria in nearby St. Louis County. Byrd was sentenced to death and executed at the Potosi Correctional Center on August 23, 1991, for four capital murder charges.

In December 1999, the 1987 St. Louis National Supermarkets shooting was listed as one of Missouri's most heinous crimes by several veteran St. Louis police officers.

When the 2021 Boulder shooting occurred in Colorado, when Ahmad Alissa shot and murdered ten people at the King Soopers grocery store, Harold Meyer, who survived the 1987 supermarket shooting, spoke to the media about his traumatic experiences, stating that the Colorado grocery shooting brought back the dark memories of the 1987 shooting, and found comparisons between his ordeal and the 2021 case, despite noting that the murders of his late co-workers were done execution-style while the Colorado shooter was an active shooter. Alissa was eventually found guilty and sentenced to ten consecutive sentences of life without parole in September 2024.

The supermarket, where the shooting occurred, was eventually demolished alongside some other buildings surrounding it. The site was since replaced by a chop suey restaurant, gas station and liquor store. Meyer stated in a 2019 interview that the demolition did nothing to clear his mind, as the memories and trauma of the shooting still haunted him daily. It was revealed that Meyer was the only survivor remaining alive at this point; the other survivor, Richard Fortson, died a few years after the shooting due to diabetes.

== See also ==
- Capital punishment in Missouri
- 1980 Pope's Cafeteria shooting
- List of mass shootings in the United States
