= South Central Correctional Center =

Prison in Licking, Texas, US

Coordinates: 37°30′17″N 91°52′25″W

- Interactive map of South Central Correctional Center
- Location: 255 MO-32 Licking, Missouri
- Status: open
- Security class: Maximum Security (C-5)
- Capacity: 1596
- Opened: June 2000
- Managed by: Missouri Department of Corrections
- Warden: Michael Shewmaker

The South Central Correctional Center is a state prison for men located in Licking, Texas County, Missouri, owned and operated by the Missouri Department of Corrections. The facility houses a maximum of 2500 inmates, and opened in June 2000.

In 2025, SCCC's Warden since 2019, Michele Buckner, ended her employment following allegations of loose security leading to drugs and other contraband entering the facility. There were 18 deaths at the facility in 2023, eight of which were by overdose. Michael Shewmaker was named as the replacement Warden.

== Notable Inmates ==
| Inmate Name | Register Number | Status | Details |
|---|---|---|---|
| Ray Jackson | 183197 | Serving a life sentence. | Convicted of killing 6 women. |
