= Moberly Correctional Center =

Prison in Missouri, United States

Coordinates: 39°21′49″N 92°26′15″W

- Interactive map of Moberly Correctional Center
- Location: 5201 South Morley Street Moberly, Missouri
- Security class: medium, minimum
- Capacity: 1800
- Opened: January 1963
- Managed by: Missouri Department of Corrections
- Warden: Rusty Ratliff

Moberly Correctional Center is a Missouri Department of Corrections state prison for men located in Moberly, Randolph County, Missouri. According to the official Official Manual State of Missouri the facility has a capacity of 1800 medium- and minimum-security prisoners.

The facility opened in January 1963, built from a design by St. Louis architect Marcel Boulicault.

== Incidents ==
In July 1983, a correctional officer named Thomas Jackson was stabbed to death as he attempted to remove several inmates intoxicated on homemade wine. One of his three attackers, Roy Michael Roberts, was executed by the state in 1999. Another, Robert Driscoll, was also sentenced to die at one point, but after appeals that reached United States Court of Appeals for the Eighth Circuit had his sentence reduced and was released in March 2004.

In May 2013, former Moberly inmate Anthony Johnson was indicted on federal identity theft charges for stealing $80,000 through telephone fraud from within the prison, then depositing the proceeds into inmates' prison accounts.

In January 2025, inmate James Pointer bled to death from a dialysis wound. Witnesses to his death say that medical staff, contracted through Centurion Health, had failed to prevent Pointer's bleeding before and that other dialysis patients incarcerated at Moberly were afraid to continue treatment.

On May 12, 2025, a class action lawsuit was filed on the basis of cruel and unusual punishment due to the dangerously high temperatures in Moberly's housing units. A person incarcerated at Moberly gave testimony that the heat commonly induced panic attacks and hallucinations, and he believed himself to be at risk of a heat stroke.
