= Missouri Eastern Correctional Center =

Prison in Missouri, United States

- Interactive map of Missouri Eastern Correctional Center
- Location: 18701 Old Highway 66 Pacific, Missouri
- Status: Operational
- Security class: Medium, Minimum
- Capacity: 1130
- Opened: January 1981
- Managed by: Missouri Department of Corrections
- Warden: Gregory Hancock

The Missouri Eastern Correctional Center (MECC) is a state prison for men located in Pacific, Missouri. Since the facility was opened in 1981, it has been owned and operated by the Missouri Department of Corrections. MECC currently has a maximum capacity of 1130 inmates, ranging from low to medium security, as well as housing inmates awaiting transfer to higher level institutions.
