= Winford Stokes =

American serial killer

- Born: Winford LaVern Stokes Jr. March 21, 1951; St. Louis, Missouri, U.S.
- Died: May 11, 1990 (aged 39); Potosi Correctional Center, Missouri, U.S.
- Status: Executed by lethal injection
- Convictions: Capital murder; Second degree murder; Manslaughter; First degree robbery (2 counts); Robbery (2 counts); Armed criminal action; Escape from custody (3 counts)
- Penalty: Death

Details
- Victims: 3 (one as an accomplice)
- Span of crimes: 1969–1978
- Country: United States
- State: Missouri
- Date apprehended: For the final time on December 11, 1978

Winford LaVern Stokes Jr. (March 21, 1951 – May 11, 1990) was an American serial killer and serial rapist. He murdered three people, for which he was sentenced to death and subsequently executed in 1990. Stokes also admitted to raping six women.

== Early life ==
Stokes was one of 10 children. He dropped out of school in 8th grade.

== Crimes ==
=== Murder of Ignatius DiManuele ===
Stokes' first recorded crime occurred on April 30, 1969. Together with David H. Richards and Allen E. Smith (17 and 18, respectively), they entered a tavern on 3044 Easton Avenue in St. Louis, posing as customers before drawing their pistols and announcing it was a robbery. The customers and the owner, Ignatius DiManuele, were forced to lay down on the ground as the three men emptied the cash register. While doing this, one of the robbers pointed their gun at DiManuele and proceeded to shoot him. When questioned about his reasons, the killer simply replied that he "wanted to get a whitey." After that, Stokes and his two accomplices escaped in his vehicle. About two weeks later, Winford was stopped for questioning by Detectives Brian Graft and Edward DeVere, during which he threw a pistol out of his car. Both men noticed this and immediately arrested him. After some questioning, they learned about Richards and Smith, who were captured soon after as well. Witnesses to the robbery identified all three of them as the ones behind the DiManuele robbery.

Stokes was sent off to await his trial at Homer G. Phillips Hospital, but several months later, along with four other inmates, he managed to escape. On October 23, 1970, when Sheriff's Deputy John Curtis entered the ward to collect the supper dishes, Stokes grabbed his revolver and forced him to the center. He had Curtis strip off his clothing and take off his shoes, taking them, as well as the keys to his car. He then tied up the deputy with pieces of a bedsheet and fled with the other prisoners. Two other prisoners were left behind, who turned back and released Curtis from the restraints. Three of the convicts were later recaptured, with the exception of Stokes and 18-year-old Joseph Wallace. He was arrested not long after, and sentenced to 9 years imprisonment for manslaughter and three other felony charges.

=== Murder of Marie Montgomery ===
After some years, Stokes was released from prison. On December 7, 1977, he knocked on the door of 71-year-old Erssie Lucas, intent on robbing him. When Lucas opened, he began beating him with a claw hammer, leaving the old man on the ground and stealing an undetermined amount of cash. Erssie survived the assault.

Only a few days later, on December 12, Stokes broke into the apartment of 73-year-old widow Marie Montgomery while looking for a place to rob. He shot her in the neck and right arm, killing her, and thereafter ransacked the premises, stealing a wristwatch. Montgomery's body would later be found by her niece, who had come to check up on Marie because she had missed the Sunday church services. Stokes was later arrested on January 15, 1978, on charges of armed robbery and armed criminal action, and sent for pre-trial mental evaluation at the Malcolm Bliss Mental Health Center. That same afternoon, Stokes managed to escape from the facility, with authorities right on his tail.

=== Murder of Pamela Benda ===
On February 21, 1978, Stokes was at a bar in northern St. Louis County when he met a 33-year-old Washington University faculty waitress named Pamela Benda. They went back to her apartment in University City, whereupon Winford started beating and stabbing Benda with a kitchen knife, before eventually strangling her. He took off her clothes and left her body in the bedroom, before rummaging through her drawer and pocketing some jewelry. He then got into her 1974 Plymouth Scamp and drove to South Bend, Indiana, where he had then been living with his wife, Ramona. He later pawned the jewelry. Initial investigations focused on Benda's boyfriend, with whom she had had scuffles the previous months, but he was cleared later on. It was determined that Benda had likely been killed by somebody she knew, as there were no signs of forced entry into her home. The case would later be named the "Mr. Goodbar" case, after a copy of the 1975 novel Looking for Mr. Goodbar by Judith Rossner was found on a bedside table in Benda's apartment.

== First trial and escape ==
In June, Stokes was indicted for the murders of Montgomery and Benda. He was sent off to Homer G. Phillips Hospital yet again, where he was to await trial for the murder charges. On December 3, however, along with Samuel Smith and Earl Davis, Stokes overpowered the guards, stole their guns and clothes, and fled. On the following day, one of the guards, Richard Campbell, resigned from his position for breaking security regulations. On December 11, all three of the fugitives were arrested by FBI agents in Chicago's South Side.

== Second trial, appeals, and execution ==
On September 10, 1979, Stokes pleaded guilty to second-degree murder for killing Montgomery and was sentenced to 50 years in prison. He was then offered a concurrent 50-year sentence if he pleaded guilty to second-degree murder for killing Benda. On September 20, 1979, Stokes, despite facing possible execution, rejected the offer and took the case to trial. The reason was that an additional murder conviction would make it much harder for him to win parole.

During the trial, the prosecution sought a death sentence, with prosecutor John Walsh pointing out that the evidence included fingerprints from the victim's apartment and car, matching those of Winford Stokes, as well as the fact that Montgomery's wristwatch was found at the pawn shop in South Bend. On October 24, he was found guilty of capital murder for killing Benda.

During the assessment of the sentence, Stokes' defense attorney, John T. McCaffrey, pointed out that an all-white jury would be biased against his client, as it was a case of a black man killing a white woman. On the contrary, prosecutor Walsh cited the convict's previous record of violent crimes, including two previous murders. On recommendation from the jury, Justice John R. Rickhoff sentenced Winford Stokes to die in the gas chamber.

The execution, scheduled for October 28, 1982, was temporarily stayed by U.S. Supreme Court Justice Harry A. Blackmun on October 25, but Stokes' appeal was later turned down by the full (en banc) Supreme Court. Six years later, the federal appellate court rejected his appeal for a final time, a decision which later affected another death row inmate, George C. Gilmore. On May 11, 1990, Winford Stokes was executed by lethal injection in the Potosi Correctional Center. He offered no final statement.

== Aftermath ==
Winford Stokes had a son, Andrew Roberson, who was removed from his mother's care at the age of 7 months due to medical neglect. Shuffled through the foster system, Roberson became a sex record with a history of violence against teenage boys. He was sentenced to 15 years in prison for the assault of a 14-year-old boy in 1986 and a 15-year-old in 1987. In 2004, Roberson, now out of prison, was charged in the death of 16-year-old Dominic Williams, whose body was found in a trash bin a few blocks from his foster home in St. Louis. In 2006, Roberson was found guilty of first degree murder and sentenced to life in prison without parole.

== See also ==
- List of people executed in Missouri
- List of people executed in the United States in 1990
- List of serial killers in the United States
