= Northeast Correctional Center =

Prison in Missouri, United States

Coordinates: 39°22′11″N 91°13′31″W

- Interactive map of Northeast Correctional Center
- Location: 13698 Airport Road Bowling Green, Missouri
- Status: open
- Security class: minimum / medium
- Capacity: 2,098
- Opened: 1998
- Managed by: Missouri Department of Corrections

not to be confused with the Northeastern Correctional Center in Massachusetts

Northeast Correctional Center is a Missouri Department of Corrections state prison for men located in Bowling Green, Pike County, Missouri. The facility opened in 1998 and has a working capacity of 2,098.

== Incidents ==
A prisoner was found dead on the baseball field within the facility in 2005.

Correctional Officer Maggie Long was stabbed several times on July 26, 2017.
