= Richard Gary Beach =

American mass murderer

- Born: 1942; Topeka, Kansas, U.S.
- Status: Incarcerated at Potosi Correctional Center
- Motive: Mental illness and anger over drug use by his victims, more importantly his stepson
- Conviction: First-degree murder (5 counts)
- Penalty: Life in prison without parole

Details
- Victims: 5
- Country: United States
- State: Missouri

Richard Gary Beach is an American limousine driver and mass murderer who fatally shot and killed five men, including his 32-year-old stepson Michael Davis and 45-year-old step-nephew Kenneth Gulley Jr., within a span of four days between March 29 and April 1, 1999, in the Westport neighborhood of Kansas City, Missouri. Authorities discovered the men's bodies four days later in their residence. Beach believed that he killed all five men in his residence because of the victims' drug use in his residence.

== Early life ==
Beach was born in Topeka, Kansas in 1942, but grew up with severe financial distress, evidence of widespread family mental illness, and experienced both physical and sexual abuse throughout his childhood. During his later years in Kansas City, he joined the United States Air Force before working through various manual and service jobs after retirement. Beach later became a limousine driver where he operated as an airport shuttle service for the Kansas City International Airport before his health, mental state, and eyesight began to decline during the 1990s. Prior to the murders, Beach's professional life was defined by his role as a small business owner. Beach managed the administrative and logistical side of the shuttle service, while his stepson Michael Davis assisted with other operations.

== Murders ==
During his final months as a shuttle worker, Beach began to lose eyesight which triggered anxiety that he felt he could no longer drive safely or manage the administrative side of the shuttle service. He testified that he felt "trapped" because his stepson Davis was not skilled enough to run the business alone, and Beach feared that the business would collapse, leaving them in poverty. Beach was reportedly obsessed with keeping his home "clean" and protecting his stepson from harmful activity.

On March 29, 1999, Beach targeted his first three victims, as he first fatally shot 28-year-old Mark Nelson after Nelson reportedly confessed to using cocaine. Beach claimed that he killed Nelson just to "save" him from the drug and to prevent his stepson from being influenced. Later that same day, Beach killed his 32-year-old stepson Michael Davis stating that he'll spare him the "shame" of Beach's failure and potential drug temptation. Beach killed 27-year-old Christopher Conrad of Overland Park, Kansas after explaining that he allegedly smoked crack with Nelson prior to his death, which he viewed as a bad influence. On March 30, Nelson's friend, 61-year-old Jerry Nickerson, was fatally shot and killed by Beach after seeing Nelson's dead body from inside the house, and on April 1, Beach fatally shot his step-nephew and last victim, 45-year-old Kenneth Gulley Jr., who entered his residence, pulled out a crack pipe, and mentioned a past sexual relationship he had with Beach's daughter.

After killing all five men, Beach covered the bodies one-by-one in covered quilts and wrote index cards before placing it on top of the covered bodies, writing each victim's names and phone numbers. On April 6, five days after his last killing, Beach called his daughter on the phone in a nearby hotel and telling her that he confessed to what he had done. He told her where he was and that he was ready to give himself up on normal life. He peacefully surrenders after calling 911 and telling officers that he killed all five men in his residence, allowing the Kansas City Police Department to take Beach into custody at his home without resistance.

== Guilty plea, sentencing, and aftermath ==
On the day after his surrender on April 7, Beach was charged with five counts of first-degree murder. On February 26, 2002, Beach agreed to plead guilty on all five of his murders. Nearly two months later on April 18, 2002, after hearing extensive testimony, Judge Charles E. Atwell of Jackson County Circuit Court sentenced Beach to life imprisonment (five terms) without parole. While the prosecution originally sought the death penalty, the judge ultimately sentenced him to life without parole after considering his mental health history, including reports of depression and obsessive-compulsive disorder. As of 2026, Beach is currently serving his life imprisonment at the Potosi Correctional Center near Mineral Point, Missouri.

== See also ==
- List of serial killers in the United States
