= Lincoln School (Vandalia, Missouri) =

- U.S. National Register of Historic Places
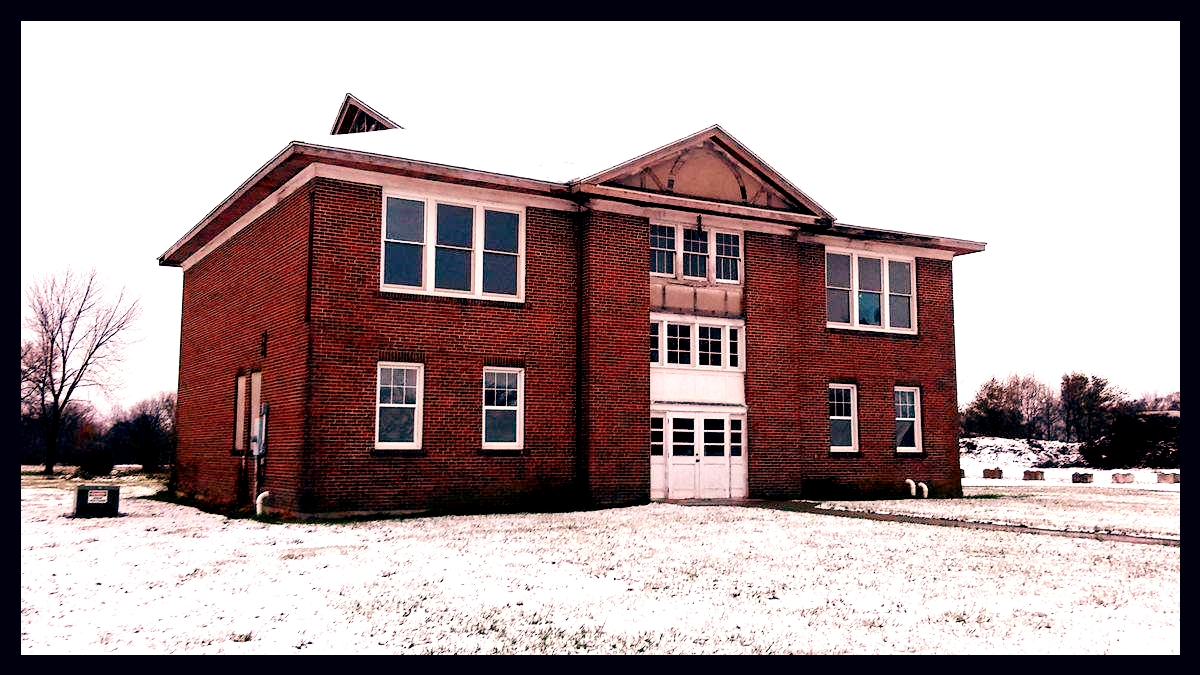
- Lincoln School in 2016

- Location within Missouri Location within the United States
- Location: 301 Lincoln St., Vandalia, Missouri
- Coordinates: 39°18′17″N 91°29′33″W
- Area: less than one acre
- Built: 1927
- Built by: Walsh Company
- NRHP reference No.: 96000060
- Added to NRHP: February 16, 1996

Lincoln School is a historic school building located at Vandalia, Audrain County, Missouri. It was built in 1927, and is a two-story, rectangular brick building with a two-story projecting bay. It operated as an exclusively African American public school from 1927 until 1955, when statewide integration of public schools was mandated.

It was listed on the National Register of Historic Places in 1996.
