= 1980 Pope's Cafeteria shooting =

1980 mass shooting in Des Peres, Missouri

- Location: Des Peres, Missouri, U.S.
- Date: October 23, 1980
- Attack type: Murders and mass shooting
- Weapon: .22 caliber pistol
- Deaths: James E. Wood, 51; Carolyn Turner, 51; Edna Ince, 68; Judy Cazaco, 37
- Perpetrators: Maurice Oscar Byrd, 25

The 1980 Pope's Cafeteria shooting occurred in Des Peres, Missouri, United States, on October 23, 1980, when 25-year-old Maurice Oscar Byrd (December 7, 1954 – August 23, 1991) entered the Pope's Cafeteria at the West County Center and opened fire on four employees. Three victims died at the scene, while the fourth, who was shot in the eyes, succumbed to her injuries a week later.

Several months after the shooting, Byrd was arrested in Savannah, Georgia, for the unrelated murder of a liquor store worker, and he was sent back to Missouri to stand trial for the mass shooting. Byrd was sentenced to death and executed by lethal injection on August 23, 1991, after he was found guilty of four counts of capital murder in his 1982 murder trial. The shooting incident was known to be one of the deadliest homicides to happen in St. Louis County.

== Murders ==
On October 23, 1980, in Des Peres, Missouri, a mass shooting broke out at a local cafeteria, which ended with four deaths in total.

The shooter, 25-year-old Maurice Oscar Byrd, entered the Pope's Cafeteria at West County Center, where four of the cafeteria's employees were clocking for their work in the morning. Inside the building itself, Byrd, who was armed with a gun, threatened the 51-year-old cafeteria manager, James E. Wood, at gunpoint and forced him to open the office safe. Afterwards, Byrd rounded up Wood and the other three employees inside the office, and he shot all four of them in their heads execution-style before he fled the cafeteria. Wood and two of the employees, 68-year-old Edna Ince and 51-year-old Carolyn Turner, died at the scene while the fourth, 37-year-old Judy Cazaco, was mortally wounded with gunshot wounds to her eyes and head but was still alive.

After the shooting, a co-worker of the victims discovered their bodies, and immediately flagged down a passing police car, prompting a swift response from law enforcement. Investigators found several shell casings from an automatic pistol at the scene and learned from a witness that a yellow, late-model Ford with three men had been seen leaving the area around the time of the shooting. About $9,000 were missing from the safe, and as for the sole survivor Judy Cazaco, she was rushed to hospital for her injuries, but she died a week later despite receiving medical treatment.

In an effort to crack the case, the police sought public appeals for witnesses and possible suspects based on the sightings reported, and even planned to use hypnosis to gain more accurate descriptions of the alleged murderer(s). According to Des Peres Police Chief Ray Johnson, the shooting itself was the first murder case in Des Peres since it was first incorporated in 1934.

== Arrest of Maurice Byrd ==
For the following eight months after the incident, Maurice Byrd was not arrested for the shooting, until he was caught for an unrelated homicide. On May 26, 1981, Byrd was arrested for the May 21 robbery-murder of a liquor store worker named Fred Johnson in Savannah, Georgia, and he was subsequently linked to the Pope's Cafeteria shootings with the discovery of a St. Louis policeman's missing badge and identification card.

Further investigations reveal that Byrd was working as a pest exterminator at the time of the shooting, that he had previously gone to the cafeteria to perform extermination services, and that he had left Missouri and his job shortly after the crime, moving to Georgia with his girlfriend and newborn child. Also, Byrd was found to have spent a large sum of money to buy a new car shortly after the shooting, giving rise to the notion that Byrd had used the money he robbed from the cafeteria to make the purchase. Prior to this, Byrd, who had formerly worked as a security guard at Saint Louis University, had been awarded a good citizen award for having helped police to recover several guns stolen from an armoury.

On June 18, 1981, Byrd, who was detained at a Georgia prison, was charged with four counts of capital murder by the Missouri authorities for the 1980 Pope's Cafeteria shooting, and a St. Louis County Circuit Court grand jury formally indicted Byrd on these quadruple charges. Under Missouri state law, the death penalty was prescribed as the maximum punishment for capital murder, and the prosecution confirmed that they would seek the death penalty for Byrd.

In July 1981, the Georgia authorities approved the extradition request of the Missouri authorities, agreeing that Byrd should be tried first in Missouri for the mass shooting, although Byrd made a subsequent legal attempt to avoid his return to Missouri for trial.

Aside from this, there were a few more suspects being arrested in connection to the killings, but none of them were ultimately charged in the end.

== Trial and sentencing ==
=== Background of Byrd ===
Born in Missouri on December 7, 1954, Maurice Oscar Byrd grew up in a large family with ten siblings (two girls and eight boys). His childhood was marked by tragedy, as one of his siblings drowned and another was stabbed to death. Their mother, Anna Byrd, worked hard to support the family, holding jobs first at a poultry store and later at a laundry. Byrd's mother was described as a religious and principled woman. Byrd attended Carver Elementary School and later Vashon High School. As a young adult, he worked in various jobs, including as a security guard and as a pest control technician. Byrd was married twice with several children, but he had not legally divorced his first wife when he began a new relationship with his second wife, and his second marriage was therefore not legally recognised.

=== Trial in Missouri ===
Maurice Byrd was put on trial before a St. Louis County jury in August 1982 for the capital murders of the four victims gunned down at the Pope's Cafeteria.

In his defence, Byrd testified that he was innocent and never committed the murders. He claimed that he indeed stole some $1,600 from an unlocked car in a shopping center and saved the rest from his wages as a pest exterminator. Byrd also testified that he had faked going to work on the day of the killings because he was hungover. He claimed to have falsified his work logs to appear as if he had completed his service route, though he accidentally dated the paperwork incorrectly.

However, Byrd's testimony was severely challenged by the prosecution. Firstly, in the case of Byrd's alleged theft of the money, he failed to recall the name or specific location of the shopping center, and law enforcement officials confirmed that no such theft had been reported. Also, Byrd's alibi was severely undermined by his employer, David Robinette, who provided records indicating that Byrd had actually serviced the accounts he claimed to have skipped. Robinette also testified that Byrd had called in that morning claiming to have a headache and left the office shortly before noon—the same time the killings occurred.

Furthermore, Byrd's second wife, Saundra Byrd, originally denied in court that she ever heard Byrd admit to the killings. However, a tape recording of her previous statement was played in court, in which she said Byrd told her he killed three people in St. Louis so he could be with her and their child in Savannah. After this, she was charged with perjury, before the charge was dropped upon her admission that she indeed lied in court. Subsequently, Saundra confirmed that Byrd indeed committed the murders per his own admission. Byrd's brother-in-law, Oscellious Green, who was also charged in the murder of Fred Johnson alongside Byrd, testified that Byrd had boasted about how he killed the people during the cafeteria shooting. A convicted robber, James Mydell, also testified that during his encounter with Byrd in prison, Byrd also confessed to his involvement in the murders.

In their closing submissions, the prosecution argued that Byrd was a "cold-blooded, calculating killer", and St. Louis prosecutor Gordon Ankney argued that there was no doubt that Byrd was indeed guilty of murdering the four victims, and the execution-style killings reflected the high degree of premeditation, deliberateness and calmness that could only point to someone fully aware of his actions. He further defended the credibility of the prosecution's witnesses, including individuals who testified that Byrd had confessed to them. Addressing the lack of direct eyewitnesses, Ankney stated chillingly, "The witnesses are dead because that’s the way Maurice kills." He concluded by calling the jury's verdict “the proper verdict with the evidence,” and confirmed his intention to seek the death penalty during the sentencing phase, though he said he would introduce no additional witnesses.

As for the defence, defense attorney William Aylward focused his closing remarks on undermining the credibility of the prosecution's key witnesses. He pointed out that several of them had criminal charges pending and had much to gain by implicating Byrd, suggesting their testimonies were self-serving and unreliable. "Did we leave our common sense at home to believe that they would not gain?" he asked the jury, appealing to their skepticism. Aylward acknowledged Byrd's past misdeeds — admitting that his client had stolen from a car, had issues with alcohol, and was "guilty of being a Black man" — but firmly argued that Byrd was not guilty of murder. He painted the prosecution's case as one built on shaky testimony and the desire for a conviction, rather than on solid, indisputable evidence.

On August 14, 1982, the jury found Byrd guilty of all four counts of capital murder. Ankney reportedly sought the death penalty for Byrd, who face a possible sentence of death or life imprisonment with the possibility of parole after minimally 50 years. Subsequently, on December 7, 1982, Byrd was formally sentenced to death via the gas chamber by St. Louis County Circuit Judge James Ruddy upon the jury's unanimous recommendation for capital punishment, although the state had not conducted any gas chamber executions after it resumed executions since 1989; all the state's executions were since carried out by lethal injection. Byrd was one of five convicts sentenced to death in Missouri during the year of 1982.

=== Trial in Georgia ===
A year after he was condemned to death row, on October 25, 1983, Byrd was tried and found guilty of robbing and murdering Fred Johnson by a Chatham County jury in Georgia. Byrd was sentenced to life imprisonment on both counts.

== Appeals ==
On September 11, 1984, the Missouri Supreme Court upheld the death sentence and murder conviction of Maurice Byrd, and dismissed his appeal. Byrd reportedly argued that the jury was biased in sentencing Byrd to death, and the death penalty was disproportionately applied in his case given that he was African-American and the victims were White, and claimed that the testimony of Byrd's second wife should not have been used against him as evidence, and the hypnosis was improperly used on a witness. However, the arguments were rejected in the appeal itself.

Subsequently, in February 1985, the U.S. Supreme Court denied Byrd's appeal and finalized his death sentence. Byrd was originally scheduled to be put to death by the gas chamber on October 27, 1987, and five days before the tentative execution date, U.S. Supreme Court Justice Harry Blackmun refused a request from Byrd to delay his execution. However, on October 26, 1987, the eve of his scheduled execution, Byrd was granted a stay of execution to grant him additional time to pursue further appeals.

On June 27, 1989, the 8th Circuit Court of Appeals rejected Byrd's appeal. One of Byrd's grounds of appeal was that as an African-American, he was unfairly judged and convicted by an all-White jury, where African-Americans were unfairly excluded and it breached his constitutional rights to a fair trial. However, this argument was rejected due to the court finding no evidence to corroborate Byrd's allegations.

A year later, a new death warrant rescheduled Byrd's execution for March 22, 1990, although U.S. District Judge John Francis Nangle granted Byrd a second stay of execution in light of a pending appeal.

On August 15, 1991, the 8th Circuit Court of Appeals overturned a court order to stay Byrd's execution, and within hours of the ruling, the Missouri Supreme Court approved another death warrant and set a new execution date for August 23, 1991. The U.S. Supreme Court rejected Byrd's final appeal hours before his execution was slated to be carried out, and the Missouri governor John Ashcroft also denied an appeal for clemency and refused to commute Byrd's death sentence to life imprisonment.

== Execution ==
On August 23, 1991, 36-year-old Maurice Oscar Byrd was put to death by lethal injection at the Potosi Correctional Center, and the official time of death was 12:04am, three minutes after Byrd was administered with the drugs. For his last meal, Byrd ordered both lobster and steak, in addition to bacon, shrimp fried rice and chicken breast. On the same date of Byrd's execution, 30-year-old Derick Lynn Peterson was executed in Virginia by the electric chair for the 1982 murder of a supermarket manager in Hampton.

Prior to his execution, Byrd was suspected of being involved in the unsolved murder of Margaret Marie Walsh, a night manager and mother of three, at Ellisville on April 23, 1980, six months before he perpetuated the cafeteria shootings. Aside from this, Byrd spent the final day of his life bidding farewell to his family and friends. Byrd was the sixth person to be executed in Missouri since the state's resumption of executions in 1989.

The execution was attended by Gordon Ankney, the prosecutor in Byrd's case, and Ronald Martin, the police chief who led the investigation. Ankney, who was originally an opponent of capital punishment, wrote an opinion piece to express his support for the death penalty and especially Byrd's execution, and also alluded to his change of stance given his years and experience of handling brutal murder cases as a prosecutor. Governor John Ashcroft also expressed that justice was served in a statement he released after the execution of Byrd.

== Aftermath ==
The 1980 Pope's Cafeteria shooting was known to be one of the deadliest and most infamous murder cases to happen in St. Louis County, Missouri. The notoriety of the case itself was surpassed seven years later by the 1987 St. Louis National Supermarkets shooting, where five people were murdered by two shooters in an armed holdup. The two perpetrators, Marvin Jennings and Donnie Blankenship, were both sentenced to life imprisonment for first-degree murder and second-degree murder respectively.

In December 1999, the 1980 Pope's Cafeteria shooting was listed as one of Missouri's most heinous crimes by several veteran St. Louis police officers.

In May 2022, Sally Huitt, the daughter of Carolyn Turner, one of the four victims of the Pope's Cafeteria shooting, accepted an interview after nearly 42 years since the murder of her mother. Huitt stated that she still felt sad and emotional over the loss of her mother, which she described as an event that happened only yesterday to her.

In 2018, a book, titled Murder At Pope's Cafeteria, was written and published by retired police chief Ronald Martin. The book covered the shooting, as well as the other crimes committed or suspected to be committed by Byrd throughout his lifetime before his execution. It was further revealed that Byrd's father and son were both arrested for murder in unrelated cases and thus sentenced to life imprisonment.

== See also ==
- List of mass shootings in the United States
- List of people executed in Missouri
- List of people executed in the United States in 1991
