= Tipton Correctional Center =

Prison in Missouri, United States

Coordinates: 38.6650°N 92.7788°W

- Interactive map of Tipton Correctional Center
- Location: 19 North Osage Street Tipton, Missouri
- Status: open
- Capacity: ~900
- Opened: 1913
- Managed by: Missouri Department of Corrections
- Director: Trevor Foley

Tipton Correctional Center is located in the city of Tipton, Missouri. Located on 150 acres, the initial construction was started in 1913. Total square footage of all buildings is 326,860 sq. ft. The address of this facility is 619 North Osage Street, ZIP code 65081-8038. Office of Administration, Facilities Management, Design and Construction.
