= Jefferson City Correctional Center =

Prison in Missouri, United States

Coordinates: 38°33′06″N 92°02′49″W

- Interactive map of Jefferson City Correctional Center
- Location: 8200 No More Victims Road Jefferson City, Missouri
- Status: open
- Security class: maximum
- Capacity: 1996
- Opened: 2004
- Managed by: Missouri Department of Corrections

The Jefferson City Correctional Center (JCCC) is a maximum security prison in Jefferson City, Missouri operated by the Missouri Department of Corrections. It houses up to 1996 inmates, with a staff of 660. It is located at Jefferson City Correctional Center (C-5), Institution, 8200 No More Victims Road Jefferson City, MO 65101.

The current JCCC was opened on September 15, 2004, replacing the Missouri State Penitentiary, also located in Jefferson City, an aging facility first opened in 1836. It is near the Algoa Correctional Center.

In December 2023, incarcerated man Othel Moore died in solitary confinement after he was seen being beaten in restraints by prison guards. Warden Doris Falkenrath and four guards left employment at the facility following investigations.

== Notable inmates ==
- Bobby Bostic, sentenced to 241 years for armed robbery and a carjacking committed when he was 16 years old in 1995.
