= Farmington Correctional Center =

Prison in the United States

Coordinates: 37°46′26″N 90°26′12″W

- Interactive map of Farmington Correctional Center
- Location: 1012 West Columbia Street Farmington, Missouri
- Security class: minimum & medium security
- Capacity: 2632
- Opened: December 1986
- Managed by: Missouri Department of Corrections
- Warden: Teri Vandergriff

Farmington Correctional Center (FCC) is a Missouri Department of Corrections state prison for men located in Farmington, Missouri, located in St. Francois County, Missouri. According to the Official Manual State of Missouri the facility has a capacity of 2632 minimum and medium security prisoners, making it one of the largest prisons in the state.

The facility opened in December 1986 on the former grounds of the Farmington State Hospital mental health facility, founded in 1903.
