= Fulton Reception and Diagnostic Center =

Prison in Missouri, United States

Coordinates: 38°50′45″N 91°55′31″W

- Interactive map of Fulton Reception and Diagnostic Center
- Location: 1393 Route O Fulton, Missouri
- Status: Open
- Security class: Minimum security and Diagnostic
- Capacity: 1508
- Opened: 1986
- Managed by: Missouri Department of Corrections

The Fulton Reception and Diagnostic Center is a state minimum-security diagnostic prison for men located in Fulton, Callaway County, Missouri, USA, owned and operated by the Missouri Department of Corrections.
