= Andrew Six =

American convicted child murderer

- 1988 mugshot of Six
- Born: Andrew Wessel Six; May 14, 1965; Pershing, Iowa, U.S.
- Died: August 20, 1997 (aged 32); Potosi Correctional Center, Missouri, U.S.
- Status: Executed by lethal injection
- Convictions: Missouri; First degree murder Federal; Kidnapping
- Penalty: Missouri; Death (July 29, 1988); Federal; 200 years imprisonment (October 23, 1987)

Details
- Victims: 4
- Date: April 12, 1984 – April 10, 1987
- Country: United States
- Locations: Iowa and Missouri
- Imprisoned at: Potosi Correctional Center

Andrew Wessel Six (May 14, 1965 – August 20, 1997) was a serial killer. On April 10, 1987, Six and his uncle Donald Petary were involved in the murder of 12-year-old Kathy Allen, who was kidnapped in Iowa before she was found dead in Missouri.

Six and Petary were both found guilty of state murder charges and sentenced to death in Missouri, and additionally received 200-year prison sentences for federal kidnapping charges. Petary died on death row in 1998 before he could be executed, while Six was put to death by lethal injection on August 20, 1997.

More than a decade later, in 2014, DNA testing posthumously identified Six as the real perpetrator behind a 1984 triple homicide in Iowa, where three members of a family were allegedly killed on April 12, 1984, by Six, who was named as the prime suspect in the case but did not face trial due to lack of evidence.

== Early life ==
Andrew Wessel Six was born in Pershing, Iowa, on May 14, 1965. His early life was marked by developmental, psychological, and environmental difficulties that contributed to a troubled upbringing. From preschool, Six was diagnosed and treated for hyperactivity, indicating behavioral issues from an early age. He grew up in a seriously dysfunctional home environment characterized by child abuse, neglect and instability, with social services agencies involved in monitoring his family situation. In elementary school, Six suffered from a hearing impairment that went untreated for approximately three years. Six later dropped out of high school.

Psychiatric evaluations conducted later in his life, including a comprehensive report by Dr. A.E. Daniel, described Six's childhood as disorganized and noted a history of hyperactivity, deafness, and clinical depression. These early adversities were compounded in adolescence and early adulthood by substance abuse and the emergence of a personality disorder with antisocial features.

== 1984 Iowa family murders ==
On April 12, 1984, under unspecified circumstances, Andrew Six committed the triple murder of a local family in Ottumwa, Iowa.

The murders were not brought to light until a day later, on April 13, 1984, when 20-year-old Justin Hook Jr. was first discovered dead outside his burned-out mobile home in rural Drakesville, Iowa. Three days after Hook's body was found, his 41-year-old mother Sarah Link was discovered dead in a farm field near Eldon, Iowa. Police and forensic investigations revealed that both Hook and Link died as a result of lethal blows to their heads.

On April 18, 1984, 19-year-old Tina Lade, Hook's fiancée, was found in a ravine about half a mile from Link's body. In fact, Lade, who was missing since the killings of Link and Hook, was sought after by the police for information relating to their deaths before the revelation of her death confirmed that she was the third victim of the triple slaying. Autopsy findings showed that Lade had also died as a result of fatal wounds on her head, and given the similarity in the manner of deaths of the three victims, the authorities deduced that they were all killed by the same person.

The triple murder shocked the local community, with many residents baffled at the violence and questioned the motive behind the slayings, which appeared to be related. Due to a lack of clues, the police had not made any arrests and could not crack the case, until Six was posthumously identified in 2014 as the murderer years after his 1997 execution for another murder.

== Murder of Kathy Allen ==
On April 10, 1987, Andrew Six committed his fourth murder, that of a young girl named Kathy Annette Allen (November 2, 1974 – April 10, 1987), by kidnapping the 12-year-old victim from her home in Ottumwa, Iowa before killing her in Missouri.

Six and his uncle Donald Eugene Petary (July 10, 1937 – May 12, 1998) approached Allen's family in Ottumwa, expressing interest in purchasing their truck, which Allen's family wanted to sell to pay the surgical fees of her father Don Allen, who had a heart condition. Allen, a special education student, her mother Stella, and 17-year-old sister Christine, who was six months pregnant, were present at their house when Petary and Six approached them.

As Stella accompanied the men to test drive the truck, the men restrained her with duct tape and took her hostage. Six and Petary drove back to Allen's house and forced her and her family (including her father, who had returned home) to get inside the house. Six restrained Don, took both Stella and Don's wallets, and raped Christine. Under Six's direction, Petary led Christine and Kathy outside and placed them in the car. Six attempted to force Stella and Don into a truck, but Don fled. In the commotion, Stella was stabbed in the throat with a butcher knife and gravely wounded. Christine was able to escape after seeing her father running away. Kathy Allen, however, remained in the car. Six joined Petary, and the two drove away with Allen, heading south.

Subsequently, the pair were arrested in Texas the day after the kidnapping of Allen. Three days later, Allen's body was found in a ditch in a rural part of Schuyler County, Missouri, after Petary led the police to where they killed Allen and dumped her body. Medical examiners concluded that Kathy Allen had died as a result of a stab wound to her neck, which had caused her to bleed to death. This injury, consistent with sharp force trauma to the neck, was inflicted after Six and Petary abducted her and took her across state lines into Missouri.

== Murder trial ==
=== State prosecution in Missouri ===
After their arrest, both Andrew Six and Donald Petary were charged by the Missouri state prosecution with first-degree murder, an offence that carries the death penalty or life imprisonment without parole under Missouri state law. Petary and Six's murder trials were carried out separately.

Ultimately, Six was found guilty of first degree murder by a Schuyler County jury on July 28, 1988. However, during the sentencing phase of Six's trial, the jury deadlocked on imposing a death sentence on Six, reaching a vote of 9–3, and as a result, the sentence was left to the discretion of the trial judge, which was rarely observed in Missouri's capital murder trials.

On July 29, 1988, 23-year-old Andrew Six was sentenced to death by Circuit Judge E. Richard Webber, a decision that shocked the family of Six. Judge Webber stated in his written grounds of decision that the aggravating circumstances of the case outweighed the mitigating factors presented by the defence and his family, and there were sufficient grounds to return with a verdict of death.

It was revealed in August 1988 that the death penalty trial of Six had incurred a heavy cost of $15,054 for Schuyler County, which put a heavy strain on the county's slim budget. A resident of Iowa anonymously sent a check to the Missouri authorities, hoping to fund the trials of both Six and Petary with the purpose of achieving justice as unhindered by the high financial costs incurred through a single death penalty trial.

In a separate trial, Petary was likewise found guilty of first degree murder and sentenced to death on November 3, 1988. Both Petary and Six were then incarcerated together on death row at the Potosi Correctional Center, the state's designated prison for male death row inmates in Missouri.

=== Federal prosecution ===
Aside from the state murder charges in Missouri, both Six and Petary were charged under federal law for the kidnapping of Allen. Given that the girl was abducted in Iowa and forcibly taken across state lines to Missouri, where she was murdered, the kidnapping was classified as a federal offence, and warranted the maximum sentence of life imprisonment under the Federal Kidnapping Act. The federal trial of both Six and Petary took place earlier than the state murder trial in Missouri.

On October 23, 1987, both Petary and Six were found guilty of kidnapping in a Des Moines federal district court and they were each sentenced to 200 years' imprisonment by two different judges. U.S. District Judge Charles R. Wolle, who presided Petary's case, pointed out that Petary was shown to be an offender incapable of rehabilitation due to his long criminal record before the abduction. Judge Harold Duane Vietor was the other judge who sentenced Six to essentially the same sentence as his uncle. The men were also ineligible for parole for a minimum period of 66 years, ensuring that both of them would die in prison.

At the time of Six's federal conviction in 1987, he did not face a death sentence since the U.S. federal government did not reinstate capital punishment until 1988 and only for certain offences involving a continuing criminal enterprise. It was not reinstated for kidnapping resulting in death until 1994. Furthermore, had Six and his uncle killed Allen in Iowa instead of Missouri, they would not have faced federal prosecution or a death sentence. Iowa abolished capital punishment for all crimes, including murder, in 1965 and has not reintroduced it, despite ongoing debates and efforts to do so over the years. The last person executed in Iowa was Victor Feguer, who was hanged on March 15, 1963, for a kidnapping in which the victim was murdered.

== Death row and execution ==
=== Appeals ===
On May 13, 1988, both Andrew Six and Donald Petary filed a joint appeal against their federal conviction for the abduction of Kathy Allen, which was denied by the 8th Circuit Court of Appeals. On September 2, 1988, Judge E. Richard Webber denied Six's appeal for a new trial.

On March 5, 1991, the Missouri Supreme Court rejected Six's appeal against his death sentence and murder conviction.

On August 27, 1996, the 8th Circuit Court of Appeals dismissed Six's appeal.

On June 2, 1997, the U.S. Supreme Court turned down the final appeal of Six.

=== Execution ===
After exhausting his appeals, Six received his death warrant, which scheduled his execution for August 20, 1997. Six was the first convict from Iowa set to be executed elsewhere outside of Iowa. This was not the first time Six was scheduled to be executed. Six years before in 1991, Six was originally scheduled twice to be executed on July 12 and October 25, 1991, but these attempts were aborted due to legal issues. Prior to his execution, Six appealed to the U.S. Supreme Court for a stay of execution, but it was denied. Six also appealed for clemency from Missouri Governor Mel Carnahan as a final recourse to avoid the death penalty, but his appeal was similarly denied.

On August 20, 1997, 32-year-old Andrew Wessel Six was put to death by lethal injection at the Potosi Correctional Center. On the same date, a condemned inmate, Carlton Jerome Pope, was executed in Virginia for the 1986 murder of Cynthia Grey.

Kathy Allen's mother was reportedly present to witness the execution of Six. Allen's mother, who still struggled with the loss of her younger daughter, stated that she supported capital punishment and felt that justice and closure was served with Six's execution. However, she remained sad and she felt sorry for Six's family, and even prayed that Six had "given his heart to the Lord."

=== Petary's fate ===
After his trials, Donald Petary was incarcerated on death row alongside his nephew at the Potosi Correctional Center. His two appeals against the death sentence were rejected by the Missouri Supreme Court in 1989 and 1990 respectively. Petary was originally scheduled to be executed on November 28, 1990, but he was granted a stay of execution a day before his tentative execution date.

Petary died of natural causes on May 12, 1998, while awaiting his execution at the Potosi Correctional Center.

== Posthumous DNA testing ==
In January 2014, about 17 years after Andrew Six was executed, the Iowa Division of Criminal Investigation (DCI) and Wapello County Sheriff Mark Miller announced that Six was the real killer of the then-unsolved 1984 Ottumwa triple murders of Justin Hook Jr., Tina Lade, and Sara Link.

In 2011, the Iowa DCI Cold Case Unit reopened the case. They re-examined evidence, including a pair of jeans worn by Tina Lade, which contained DNA material. In March 2012, forensic analysis confirmed that the DNA matched Andrew Six. This breakthrough led to the conclusion that Six was responsible for the triple homicide, although the motive was unknown.

In fact, Six was long suspected of being the killer in the case even before the police cracked the case, after police uncovered that he had a dispute with Hook over a vehicle purchase prior to the murders. Despite so, Six was never charged with the triple murders. Authorities later tried to question him about the killings again before his 1997 execution by lethal injection, but he declined to cooperate. According to retired DCI supervisor Sam Swaim, he regretted that the triple murder was never solved earlier, as an earlier capture of Six would have prevented Allen from falling victim to him three years after the slaying.

The resolution of the 1984 triple homicide case brought a sense of closure to the victims' families. Cynthia Moyes, daughter of Sara Link and sister of Justin Hook, expressed that while the news was painful, it provided some comfort to know that the person responsible for her family's deaths had been held accountable.

== See also ==
- Capital punishment in Missouri
- List of people executed by lethal injection
- List of people executed in Missouri
- List of people executed in the United States in 1997
- List of serial killers in the United States
