= Roy Michael Roberts =

American murderer (1952–1999)

Roy Michael "Hog" Roberts (December 18, 1952 – March 10, 1999) was an American murderer. He was executed in Missouri by lethal injection at the Potosi Correctional Center, for assisting the murder of a correctional officer named Tom Jackson in Missouri's Moberly Correctional Center in July 1983. Jackson and five other prison guards were attacked by a mob of 30 inmates during a prison riot. At the time of the murder, Roberts, who had six prior felony convictions was serving an 18-year sentence for two counts of first degree robbery and a theft conviction. The robberies had involved the use of violence.

Roberts was convicted of capital murder for having held Jackson and punching another guard who tried to intervene, thus allowing fellow inmates to murder him. Two fellow inmates were also convicted for their role in Jackson's murder, Rodney Carr and Robert Driscoll. Both men were also convicted of capital murder. Carr was sentenced to life in prison without the possibility of parole for 50 years and Driscoll, a member of the Aryan Brotherhood, was sentenced to death. In 2004, Driscoll was released from prison under time served after being convicted of voluntary manslaughter at a retrial.

Robert's final statement was, "You're killing an innocent man and you all can kiss my ass."

A 2005 investigation was opened to investigate the possibility of Roberts' innocence. No physical evidence connected Roberts to the crime. Four eyewitnesses, including three corrections officers, testified that Roberts had participated in the murder, while nine witnesses, including another corrections officer, had testified that Roberts had been elsewhere at the moment of the stabbing. Roberts himself admitted to participating in the riot and punching a prison guard, but denied any role in Jackson's murder.

Ray Newberry, the chief investigator in the case, remained adamant that Roberts was guilty, saying he had a history of causing trouble in prison. Missouri Attorney General Jay Nixon also dismissed claims of Roberts's innocence, saying he had been the ringleader in Jackson's murder. Court records stated that prior to the attack on Jackson, Roberts and another inmate had shouted, "Let's rush them."

== See also ==
- Capital punishment in Missouri
- Capital punishment in the United States
- List of people executed in Missouri
- List of people executed in the United States in 1999

== General references ==
- State of Missouri v. Roy Roberts. The Missourinet. Retrieved on 2007-11-15.
- Death Row - Capital Punishment in Missouri - Executions: 1989-2005. The Missourinet. Retrieved on 2007-11-18.
