= Ray Jackson (serial killer) =

American serial killer

- Born: August 28, 1967 (age 59); Kansas City, Missouri, U.S.
- Other name: The Gillham Park Strangler
- Status: Incarcerated
- Convictions: First degree murder (6 counts); First degree assault
- Penalty: Life imprisonment without parole

Details
- Victims: 6
- Span of crimes: September 1989 – April 1990
- Country: United States
- State: Missouri
- Date apprehended: April 1990
- Imprisoned at: South Central Correctional Center, Licking, Missouri

Ray Shawn Jackson (born August 28, 1967), known as The Gillham Park Strangler, is an American serial killer who strangled six women to death in Kansas City, Missouri from 1989 to 1990, dumping the victims' bodies in the area surrounding Gilliam Park.

== Biography ==
Ray Shawn Jackson was born on August 28, 1967, as the only son of his parents. At age seven, his family moved him to Kansas City, where he was raised in a rather poor environment. In his late teens, he began working as a semiliterate laborer.

== Murders ==
In the span of seven months, between September 1989 and April 1990, the bodies of six prostitutes were found dumped in areas in or around Gillham park, mid-town of Kansas City, Missouri.

- Annette Stewart, 33, found dead on September 16, 1989, near 31st and Oak streets in Kansas City.
- Kimberly Creer, 22, found dead on September 20, 1989, in Gillham Park.
- Tresa Williams, 21, found dead on October 22, 1989, at 4136 Euclid Ave in Kansas City.
- Janice Berryman, 36, found dead on October 28, 1989, in Gillham Park.
- Tonya Ward, 23, found dead on January 18, 1990, in Gillham Park.
- Michelle Mitchell, 22, found dead on April 5, 1990, in Gillham Park.

In April 1990, a man walking his dog through Gillham Park spotted a man having sex with a woman. Upon closer inspection, however, it became clear that it was an act of rape. The perpetrator fled the area when the man intervened. The woman regained consciousness and was able to give a description of the man. Police had an idea of the suspect's geographic pattern, as he either lives near, or had connections with the park. After questioning people in the area, they told police about Ray Jackson. Police took Jackson into questioning, and after an interrogation, he confessed. He told the police that he had been involved in multiple murders.

Jackson said he would walk alone at night and ask women on the streets if they wanted to smoke crack cocaine. After the woman agreed, he would walk with her to a secluded area in or near Gillham Park, where he choked them from behind until they lost consciousness. He would then awaken them, strip them, rape them, and strangle them. Jackson would position the bodies in sexually provocative poses and leave their clothes strewn around the crime scene.

The case of the surviving victim was different in that Jackson had followed her beforehand. When he asked her to join him, she refused. Jackson later attacked her and dragged into some bushes, where he tried to choke her before the passerby intervened.

== Conviction ==
To avoid a possible death sentence, Jackson pleaded guilty to six counts of first degree murder and one count of first degree assault for the surviving victim. He was sentenced to life in prison without parole. Jackson is currently incarcerated at South Central Correctional Center.

== See also ==
- List of serial killers in the United States
