= Unfair prejudice (United States) =

Unfair prejudice in United States evidence law may be grounds for excluding relevant evidence. "Unfair prejudice" as used in Rule 403 is not to be equated with testimony that is simply adverse to the opposing party. Virtually all evidence is prejudicial or it is not material. The prejudice must be "unfair".
