= Women's Eastern Reception, Diagnostic and Correctional Center =

Prison in Missouri, United States

Coordinates: 39°19′04″N 91°28′35″W

- Interactive map of Women's Eastern Reception, Diagnostic and Correctional Center
- Location: 1101 US-54 Vandalia, Missouri
- Status: open
- Security class: mixed
- Capacity: 2076
- Opened: 1998
- Managed by: Missouri Department of Corrections
- Director: Angela Mesmer

The Women's Eastern Reception, Diagnostic and Correctional Center (WERDCC) is a prison in Vandalia, Missouri, in the United States. It is a part of the Missouri Department of Corrections.

Inmates were first assigned to the WERDCC in January 1998. The prison houses 2,076 minimum to maximum security female inmates and certified juveniles. It acts as the intake center for females entering the prison system from around the state and also includes a permanent inmate population. This prison houses female Death Row for the state.

The Center processes female inmates for assignment to permanent population at WERDCC, Chillicothe Correctional Center or the community release center treatment programs for women in St. Louis or Kansas City. Processing includes prison orientation, educational, psychiatric and medical testing, risk assessment, AIDS testing and a drug education program.

The InnerChange Freedom Initiative program is available at WERDCC.

Due to law changes, this facility no longer houses juvenile offenders.
