= Sahnish Scouts =

Non-profit organization

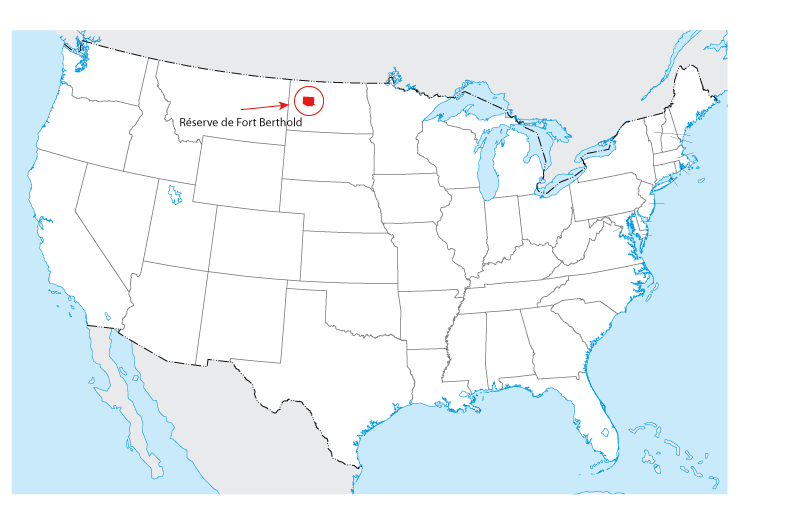
Reserve de Fort Berthold. Area of the beginning of the Sahnish Scouts.

The Sahnish Scouts is a non-profit organization group that responds to the disappearances of indigenous peoples in North Dakota. The group was founded in 2013 by Lissa Yellowbird-Chase, originally in the Bakken oilfields of North Dakota. The Sahnish Scouts publicize missing persons profiles and updates through social media, such as the Sahnish Scouts Facebook and Twitter page, as well as using posters. The Sahnish Scouts have equipment of boats, sonar, ground-penetrating radar, and dogs to use during searches. The organization has helped search and investigate across the Midwest and Northern Plains, Lissa Yellowbird herself having worked on missing cases within North Dakota, South Dakota, Minnesota, Iowa, Montana, Oklahoma, Nebraska, and even California.

== Mission ==
The Sahnish Scouts was created after Sahnish woman Lissa Yellowbird-Chase noticed several missing oil workers in the Bakken oilfields of North Dakota and family members not being able to find answers on the missing people. The organization's efforts are a response to a broader crisis of missing and murdered indigenous people in the United States. The Sahnish Scouts' mission is not only to find the missing and murdered peoples, but to also provide a safe space for friends and family of those persons.

== Notable cases ==
KC Clarke was a 29-year-old man who moved to the Fort Berthold Reservation in North Dakota for work and was reported missing in 2012. Lissa Yellowbird-Chase and the Sahnish Scouts worked for 4 years on the case, but in a court case in 2016, Clarke's employer, James Henrikson, confessed to having hired a person to kill Clarke. Henrikson was then charged with murder-for-hire, conspiracy to commit murder-for-hire, and solicitation to commit murder-for-hire for KC Clarke, but his remains have yet to be found.

Olivia Lone Bear was a 32-year-old woman who went missing from the Fort Berthold Reservation in 2017. Lone Bear was reported missing by her father after noticing her wallet and phone left in the house. The next summer, Lissa Yellowbird-Chase and the Sahnish Scouts went out on Lake Sakakawea, equipped with a sonar, which then found Lone Bear's truck and her body inside.

Rita Papakee was last seen leaving work at 1pm on January 16, 2015. She was reported missing to her family on February 18, 2015. The case has been ongoing with few leads. The Sahnish Scouts led a community search of Tama county and the Meswaki Nation she called home. As of December 2022 she remains missing.

Carla Yellowbird left home with a friend Suna Guy heading to the spirit lake reservation in August 2016. After her family had not heard from her, they reported her missing. Carla, who is Lissa Yellowbird-Chase's niece, was later found to have been murdered in a robbery attempt by Suna Guy and 2 other men. They were convicted in 2019 of murder and sentenced.

== See also ==
- Sexual victimization of Native American women
- Suicide among Native Americans in the United States
- Historical trauma
- Native Americans in the United States
