= Southeast Correctional Center =

Prison in Missouri, United States

Coordinates: 36°53′40″N 89°21′02″W

- Interactive map of Southeast Correctional Center
- Location: 300 Pedro Simmons Drive Charleston, Missouri
- Status: open
- Security class: maximum
- Capacity: 1,658
- Opened: 2001
- Managed by: Missouri Department of Corrections

Southeast Correctional Center is a Missouri Department of Corrections maximum security state prison for men located in Charleston, Mississippi County, Missouri. It opened in 2001, and has a maximum capacity of 1,507 inmates.
