= Bobby Bostic =

American writer

- Bostic in 2019, in the visitors room at Jefferson City Correctional Center
- Born: January 5, 1979 (age 47)
- Education: Missouri State University
- Status: Released
- Motive: Financial gain
- Convictions: Robbery, attempted robbery, armed criminal action, assault, kidnapping
- Penalty: 241 years
- Website: freebobbybostic.com

Bobby Bostic (born January 5, 1979) is an American writer who was sentenced to a prison term of 241 years. On December 12, 1995, Bostic, aged 16, along with 18-year-old Donald Hutson robbed a group of people in Missouri at gunpoint, and shortly thereafter robbed and briefly detained a woman in her car. The pair were caught later that day. Hutson was offered a plea deal and accepted 30 years in prison. On the advice of family, Bostic declined the same offer and elected to go to trial. He was given a sentence of 241 years by Judge Evelyn Baker, making him eligible for parole when he was 112. Bostic was serving the longest sentence in Missouri given to a juvenile for non-homicide offenses.

Bostic's case attracted considerable media attention in later years, due to changing laws regarding life-sentences for minors, and the severity of his sentence. Judge Baker later stated she regretted giving Bostic the sentence, and actively supported his unsuccessful appeal to the Supreme Court of the United States in 2018, along with Ken Starr, Sally Yates, Donald B. Verrilli Jr. and over 100 current and former judges, prosecutors and law enforcement officers. In 2021, a new law passed allowing Bostic to apply for parole. His application was approved and he was released on November 9, 2022.

== Background ==
Bostic was born in St. Louis, Missouri, and has three siblings, an elder brother and sister and a younger brother. Bostic states his father was not present during his childhood and he had no male role models. Bostic's family was financially unstable, and they were often "technically homeless" and staying with relatives. He reportedly started drinking and smoking at age 10, using marijuana at 12 and PCP at 13. Bostic began stealing cars around this age. He graduated from junior high but dropped out shortly after commencing high school. His younger brother was shot and paralyzed when Bostic was 15; he has since died. When he was 16, Bostic was on probation for assault. He also had other arrests for which he had yet to be prosecuted. At one drug-related conviction he was legally assessed as being an adult.

== Crime and sentencing ==
On December 12, 1995, Bostic had been drinking and smoking marijuana and PCP with his friend Donald Hutson. When a female friend told them she had been assaulted, the two retrieved firearms and went to confront her alleged attacker; the confrontation was resolved without gun violence. Upon leaving the area, Bostic and Hutson noticed a group of six people alongside a truck packed with items. The group was delivering donations to a needy family for Christmas. Bostic and Hutson formed the idea to rob the group immediately, confronting them with their guns drawn, demanding money from a man. When the man refused, Bostic shot at him; the bullet grazed him, after which he surrendered $500. They also took a wallet from another man in the group and a leather jacket from a woman in the group.

Bostic and Hutson then attempted to go to a friend's house nearby, though she would not let them stay with her. Instead, they went back out into the street, immediately carjacking a woman. They detained the woman in the car while they drove off, robbing her of her coat, earrings and purse; Hutson also groped her breasts. In court, the woman testified she thought Hutson was going to rape her, though Bostic, who was driving, intervened and stopped him. The pair released the woman shortly thereafter. They were arrested about an hour later.

Four months later, Bostic was offered a plea deal of 30 years in prison. He turned it down on the advice of relatives and the belief that any eventual sentence could not be worse than the terms of the plea deal. He instead elected to go to trial, later saying "I knew I was guilty ... but I always thought I had a better chance with the jury. As a 17-year-old, I still wasn't thinking clearly." Bostic was found guilty of 17 charges, including eight of armed criminal action, three of robbery and one of kidnapping. The judge, Evelyn Baker, ordered his charges run consecutively giving him 241 years in prison with the possibility of parole at 112. Part of Baker's reasoning for the sentences length was that Bostic showed no remorse at the time, though she later said she realized his attitude was actually "adolescent bravado" and that he was a "child, trying to pretend that he was really, really tough.” Bostic was serving the longest sentence in Missouri given to a juvenile for non-homicide offenses.

Hutson accepted a 30-year plea deal and was sentenced to such by Judge Baker. He later stated he had been the main instigator of the attack and that Bostic was following his lead, adding that he deserved a longer sentence than Bostic. One of the victims testified in court that Bostic "just stood there looking stupid" for most of the robbery. Hutson would have been eligible for parole in 2020, but died of a drug overdose in custody in September 2018.

== Aftermath, legal challenges and release ==
In the 2010 case of Graham v. Florida, the Supreme Court of the United States ruled it is unconstitutional to sentence people under 18 to life-imprisonment without parole for non-homicide offenses. In 2016, the court ruled that this law should be applied retroactively. Bostic's case, however, was not affected by these changes, as technically he was not sentenced to life in prison, rather he was sentenced to 241 years with a possibility of parole in "extreme old age". The penalty has been described as a "de facto life sentence", separated only from an actual life sentence by legal distinction.

Scientists have discovered so much about brain development in the more than 20 years since I sentenced Bostic. What I learned too late is that young people's brains are not static; they are in the process of maturing.

— Evelyn Baker, writing in 2018 about regretting her sentencing of Bostic.

In 2017, the American Civil Liberties Union lodged an appeal of Bostic's case to the US Supreme Court. The case received signatures and statements of support from people including Ken Starr, Sally Yates, Donald B. Verrilli Jr., and over 100 current and former judges, prosecutors and law enforcement officers. Among those campaigning for his release was Evelyn Baker. Baker, who retired in 2008 after a 25-year career as a judge, states Bostic's sentence is the only one she regrets giving; Baker believes a 30-year sentence would have been appropriate. However Josh Hawley, who was the Missouri Attorney General at the time, defended Bostic's sentence, saying it did not violate the Constitution's ban on cruel and unusual punishment. In his official response to the appeal, he urged the court to uphold Bostic's sentence. In April 2018, the Supreme Court rejected Bostic's appeal without giving a reason for doing so. Attorney general of the District of Columbia Karl Racine subsequently co-wrote an article criticizing the court's decision and calling for juvenile sentence reform.

In January 2020, a bill sponsored by Missouri House of Representatives member Nick Schroer and co-sponsored by member Barbara Washington was introduced, which if passed would have given people sentenced as juveniles greater opportunity for parole; Bostic was mentioned by name in the introduction of the bill as a prisoner who would be affected by its passing. A separate petition asking Missouri Governor Mike Parson to grant Bostic clemency was launched around the same time, and gathered around 50 signatures from both Republicans and Democrats. The bill, which had strong bi-partisan support and had been expected to pass, was never debated due to the COVID-19 pandemic. As of May 2020, Bostic's only chance of release was the clemency petition being approved by Parson.

In May 2021, an amendment inspired by Bostic's case was added to Senate Bill 26 in Missouri by Rep. Mark Sharp, giving anyone who committed a crime other than murder as a minor the possibility of parole after 15 years. The bill passed and was signed into law in July 2021. Bostic was subsequently granted a parole hearing in November 2021. None of Bostic's victims opposed him being given parole or clemency, and some wrote letters of support for his release. His parole was approved in December 2021 for release the following year. Prison rules allowed only one person to accompany Bostic to parole; he chose Evelyn Baker, who accepted and advocated for his release at the hearing. Bostic was among the first people to be granted parole under the new law. He was released on November 9, 2022, and was greeted by Baker and dozens of family and supporters.

== Personal life ==
While in prison, Bostic completed a General Educational Development diploma, an associate degree and over 30 rehabilitation classes and programs. He has completed courses from Adams State University and Missouri State University. Bostic is a published author, having written poetry and non-fiction books. Bostic founded a book club in prison, and after writing to the St. Louis County Library, inspired efforts from the librarians to create projects to improve literacy in prison.
