= Potosi Correctional Center =

Maximum security prison located in Missouri, US

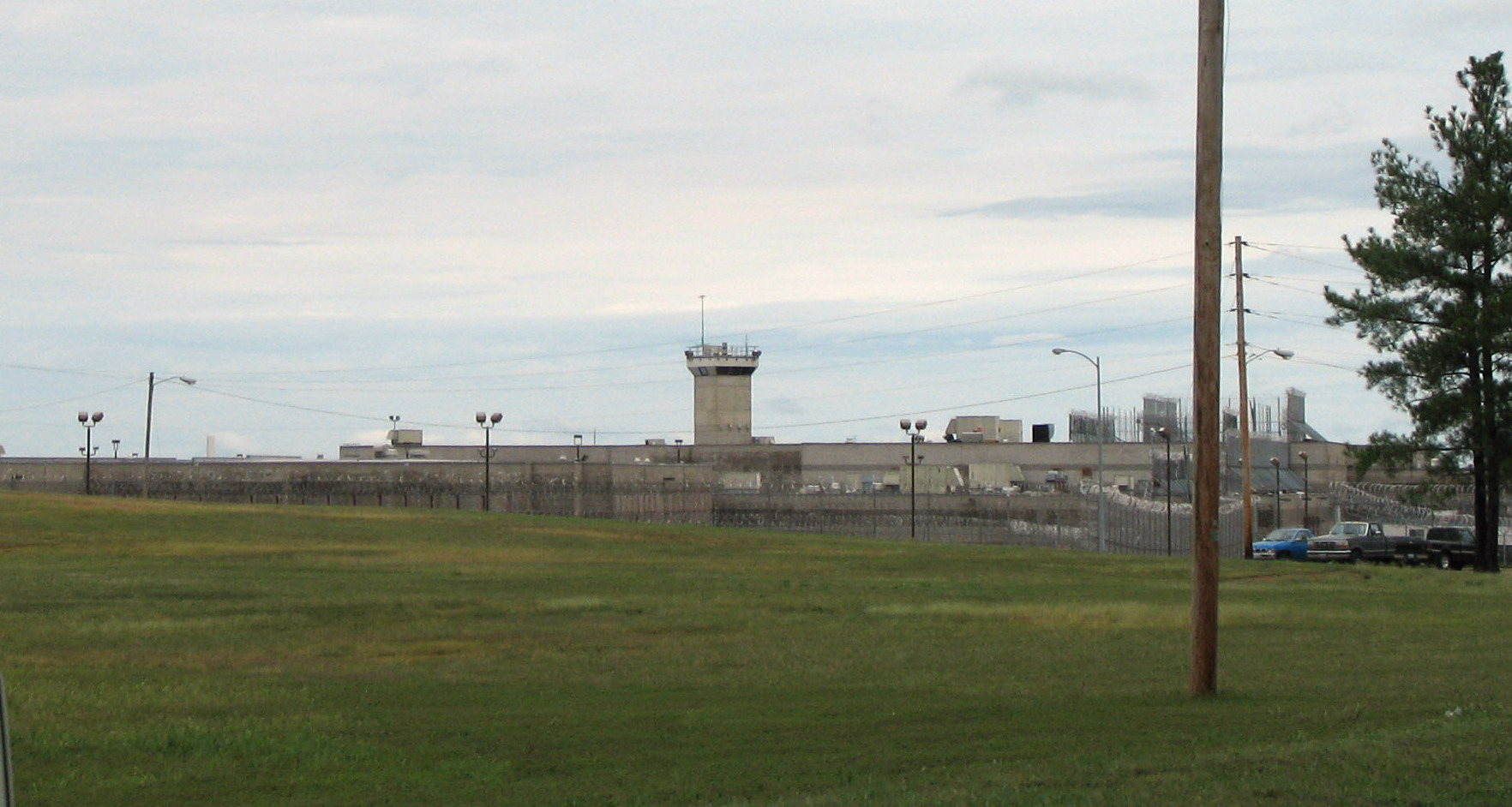
- Interactive map of Potosi Correctional Center
- Location: 11593 State Highway O Mineral Point, Missouri; 37°56′11″N 90°44′12″W
- Status: open
- Security class: Maximum, Death Row
- Capacity: 800
- Population: 897 (112.1%) (June 30, 2012)
- Opened: 1989
- Managed by: Missouri Department of Corrections
- Warden: Heather Cofer
- Website: https://doc.mo.gov/node/541

Potosi Correctional Center (PCC) is a Missouri Department of Corrections prison located in unincorporated Washington County, Missouri, near Mineral Point. The facility houses 897 inmates as of the 2020 U.S. census. It is a Level 5 maximum security prison for male inmates.

The facility, which opened in 1989, is a maximum security prison. In 1989 it had about 200 prisoners.

Shortly after the prison's opening, the majority of the non-death row prisoners at Potosi were serving long sentences, such as life imprisonment without parole, or sentences with a 50-year minimum before parole eligibility. A small number had shorter sentences.

== Death row ==
In April 1989 the state transferred its 70 death row inmates from Jefferson City Correctional Center (JCCC, originally Missouri State Penitentiary) to Potosi. The U. S. District Court for the Western District of Missouri approved some modifications to the consent decree before the inmates were moved to Potosi. Originally death row prisoners lived in a 92-bed, two wing facility at PCC. The death row inmates had their own special custody levels: minimum custody, medium custody, close custody, and administrative segregation. One wing housed the minimum custody death row inmates, with another wing housing the others. The classification system was intended to award privileges to death row prisoners exhibiting good behavior.

After inmates filed legal challenges, in the late 20th century, prison administrators began to consider whether to integrate death row prisoners into the non-death row population. The majority of non-death row prisoners at PCC had very long sentences and had been convicted for crimes similar to those for which death row inmates were convicted.

MDOC began to stop using the word "death row", believing it to be negative. It began referring to death row prisoners as "'capital punishment' (CP) inmates".

For the first time in MDOC history, the state began to allow death row prisoners to leave their housing units, with staff escorts, to eat meals. When no serious incidents occurred, MDOC officials began to use an escort system so that death row prisoners could use the gymnasium. The death row prisoners also began to have access to the law library, and were permitted to work in the laundry facility. On January 8, 1991, death row prisoners were fully mainstreamed into the population.

== Executions ==
Sixty-one executions were carried out by lethal injection at the Potosi Correctional Center between January 1990 and March 2005. In April 2005, the site of executions was moved 25 miles (40 km) east to the Eastern Reception, Diagnostic and Correctional Center in Bonne Terre, Missouri.

Death row prisoners are housed at Potosi until shortly before their scheduled execution. They are then moved to Bonne Terre. Since November 20, 2013, the state has carried out more than 34 executions.

== Notable inmates ==
=== Current ===
- Charles "Billy" Armentrout – Found guilty of capital murder and originally sentenced to Death Row in the beating death of his grandmother, Inez Notter. In 2006, an appeal resulted in a St. Louis circuit judge reducing his sentence to life in prison. Armentrout's story was the subject of the Netflix docuseries I Am a Killer (Season 2, Episode 7).
- Richard Gary Beach – Convicted of murdering five men in his Kansas City, Missouri residence.
- Nicholas Godejohn – Convicted of murdering Dee Dee Blanchard.
- Emory Futo – Convicted of murdering his parents and two brothers.
- Donnie Blankenship and Marvin Jennings – Sentenced to life imprisonment for the 1987 St. Louis National Supermarkets shooting.

=== Former ===
- Zein Isa – Murdered his daughter in an honor killing in 1989 and died in 1997.
- Terry Blair – Originally convicted of murdering Angela Monroe in the 1980s, and was later released. While out of prison, he murdered a further six women. Blair died in May 2024.

=== Executed ===
- Winford Stokes – Executed May 11, 1990.
- Maurice Oscar Byrd – Executed August 23, 1991.
- Walter Junior Blair – Executed July 21, 1993.
- Larry Griffin – Executed June 21, 1995.
- Anthony LaRette – Executed November 29, 1995.
- Robert Earl O'Neal – Executed December 6, 1995.
- Andrew Six – Executed August 20, 1997.
- Kelvin Malone – Executed January 13, 1999.
- Roy Michael Roberts – Executed March 10, 1999.
- Stanley Lingar – Executed February 7, 2001.
