= Missouri Department of Corrections =

State agency operating Missouri's correctional facilities

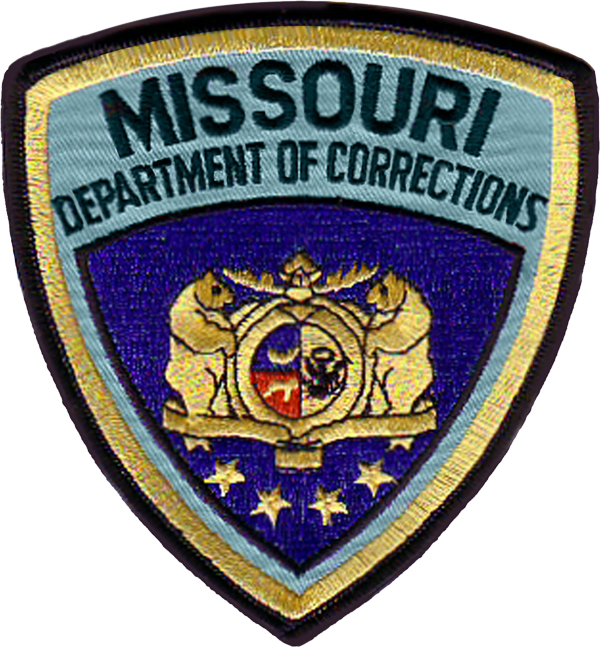
- Abbreviation: MODOC
- Motto: "A Safer Missouri and the Standard of Excellence in Corrections"

Agency overview
- Formed: 1820
- Employees: 11,000
- Annual budget: $639,565,970

Jurisdictional structure
- Operations jurisdiction: Missouri, United States
- Map of Missouri Department of Corrections's jurisdiction
- Area: 69,715 square miles (180,560 km^{2})
- Population: 6,137,428 (2019 est.)
- General nature: Local civilian police

Operational structure
- Headquarters: Jefferson City, Missouri, U.S.
- Elected officer responsible: Mike Kehoe, Governor of Missouri
- Agency executive: Trevor Foley, Director

Website
- doc.mo.gov

The Missouri Department of Corrections is the state law enforcement agency that operates state prisons in the U.S. state of Missouri. It has its headquarters in Missouri's capital of Jefferson City.

The Missouri Department of Corrections has 21 facilities statewide, including two community release centers. It has more than 11,000 employees, about three-quarters of whom are either certified corrections officers or probation officers. Missouri Department of Corrections has K9 units statewide that are frequently utilized for tracking escapees and, in cases of small or rural law enforcement agencies, criminals who have fled from law enforcement or assisting in search and rescue for missing persons.

== Operations ==
Prisoners newly inducted into the MDOC system are placed in diagnostic institutions. Adult male prisoners may go to either the Eastern Reception & Diagnostic Center, the Fulton Reception & Diagnostic Center, or the Western Reception & Diagnostic Center. All incoming female prisoners, including adults and minors under 17 who are convicted on adult charges in adult courts, are sent to the Women's Eastern Reception, Diagnostic & Correctional Center. Male prisoners under 17 years of age who are convicted in adult criminal courts were sent to the Northeast Correctional Center which no longer houses minor offenders, minors are now sent to Farmington Correctional Center. Male death row inmates are sent directly to Potosi Correctional Center.

The department has a problem with harassment of and by its employees. During the period from fiscal 2002 to 2006, the state paid out just $340,000 in court awards to its own employees. During the period from 2012 to 2016, the figure was over $7.5 million. Court documents show a culture of sexual and racial harassment by employee against other employees.

Governor Mike Parson signed a contract with Aramark for food and dining services in Missouri prisons. After initially good results, it was reported that the quality of food deteriorated, and supplies included in the contract, such as salt and pepper or cleaning supplies, were not being provided.

Healthcare is contracted out to Centurion Health since 2021. The company was previously owned by Centene Corporation but sold to private investors in 2023. Poor healthcare has been named as a factor in increased death rates among Missouri's incarcerated population.

Four prisons have no air conditioning in housing units. In May 2025, the MacArthur Justice Center filed a lawsuit against Missouri Department of Corrections on the basis of cruel and unusual punishment of dangerously high temperatures, particularly for solitary confinement chambers.

== Fallen officers and staff members ==
Since the establishment of the Missouri Department of Corrections, seventeen officers, 1 Probation and Parole Officer and a District Administrator have died while on duty.

The causes of death are as follows:

Cause of deaths	Deaths
Automobile accident	2
Assault	2
COVID-19	8
Gunfire	2
Heart attack	1
Stabbed	5
Total	20

== History ==
The Cornerstone of the correctional system in Missouri was the Missouri State Penitentiary Jefferson City in 1836.It is the oldest penitentiary west of the Mississippi River. Originally, the facility only housed prisoners; it also had a hospital, and industrial, academic, and vocational programs. MSP was closed in 2004 and Offenders were moved to the newly constructed Jefferson City Correctional Center.

== Death row ==
Male death row offenders are housed at the Potosi Correctional Center (PCC), while female death row offenders are housed at the Women's Eastern Reception, Diagnostic and Correctional Center (WERDCC). Eastern Reception, Diagnostic and Correctional Center (ERDCC) houses the State of Missouri execution chamber.

The first person executed in the modern era was George Mercer who was executed at the Missouri State Penitentiary in Jefferson City, Missouri on January 6, 1989. The next 61 executions starting with Gerald Smith were done at the Potosi Correctional Center in Mineral Point, Missouri. Since April 2005, executions have been 25 miles east of Potosi at the Eastern Reception, Diagnostic and Correctional Center in Bonne Terre, Missouri. The first execution at Bonne Terre was #63 Donald Jones.

== Deaths in prison ==
In March 2010, it was reported that the leading cause of prisoner deaths is cancer. Heart disease and liver disease are the next most common causes of prisoner deaths. Offender deaths caused by drug overdose are common.

Until 2024, the Department of Corrections did not report comprehensive data related to deaths in prison. A retroactive report for 2018-2024 was created following requests from The Marshall Project, which showed 844 over the seven year period. In 2024, death rates at South Central and Potosi were higher than the state general population death rate.

In February 2025, James Pointer bled to death at Moberly Correctional Center from a dialysis wound and lack of medical care.

== Facilities ==
Below is a list of Missouri state correctional facilities.

Name	Security Level
Algoa Correctional Center	Medium
Boonville Correctional Center	Minimum
Central Missouri Correctional Center (Church Farm)	(Minimum) (Closed)
Chillicothe Correctional Center	Minimum, Medium, Maximum
Cremer Therapeutic Community Center	(Minimum - Medium) (Closed)
Crossroads Correctional Center	Medium - Maximum
Eastern Reception, Diagnostic and Correctional Center	Minimum, Medium, Maximum, Diagnostic
Farmington Correctional Center	Minimum - Medium
Fulton Reception and Diagnostic Center	Minimum, Diagnostic
Jefferson City Correctional Center	Medium - Maximum
Transition Center of Kansas City	(Minimum, Work Release)
Transition Center of Saint Louis	(Minimum, Work Release)
Maryville Treatment Center	Minimum
Missouri Eastern Correctional Center	Minimum - Medium
Missouri State Penitentiary (Closed 2004)	(Maximum) (Closed)
Moberly Correctional Center	Minimum - Medium
Northeast Correctional Center	Minimum - Medium
Ozark Correctional Center	(Minimum)(Drug Treatment)
Potosi Correctional Center	Minimum, Medium, Maximum, (Death Row)
Renz Women's Prison	(Minimum) (Closed)
South Central Correctional Center	Minimum, Medium, Maximum
Southeast Correctional Center	Minimum, Medium, Maximum
Tipton Correctional Center	Minimum
Western Missouri Correctional Center	(Minimum - Medium) (Closed)
Western Reception, Diagnostic and Correctional Center	(Minimum, Diagnostic)
Women's Eastern Reception, Diagnostic and Correctional Center	Minimum, Medium, Maximum, Diagnostic, (Death Row)

Former facilities:

- Missouri State Penitentiary (closed in 2004)
- Central Missouri Correctional Center (closed June 2005)

As of 2010 the state did not use private prisons or export prisoners to facilities in other states. Previously, in 1995, the state had exported prisoners to the Newton County Correctional Center in Newton, Texas, to temporarily alleviate overcrowding. The two private prisons in the state (Integrity Correctional Center near Holden, Missouri and Bridewell Prison in Bethany, Missouri) both closed in 2010, and had never held Missouri state inmates.

== Missouri Reentry Conference ==
Each year, the Missouri Department of Corrections co-sponsors a Missouri Reentry Conference held in Tan-Tar-A Resort in Osage Beach. The conference, which began in 2005, features speakers and workshops concerning issues surrounding Missouri’s ex-offender population. The conferences average over 300 attendees annually. The intent of the conference is to provide high-quality education and networking opportunities for corrections professionals and community-based partners involved in the state's reentry process.

In addition to the Missouri Department of Corrections, other co-sponsors include Area Resources for Community and Human Services (ARCHS), the Missouri Department of Social Services, and Family and Community Trust (FACT).

== See also ==
- List of law enforcement agencies in Missouri
- List of United States state correction agencies
- Lists of United States state prisons
- Prison
