= List of people executed in Missouri (pre-1972) =

The following is a list of people executed in the U.S. state of Missouri before 1972, when capital punishment was briefly abolished by the Supreme Court's ruling in Furman v. Georgia. For executions after the restoration of capital punishment by the Supreme Court's ruling in Gregg v. Georgia (1976), see List of people executed in Missouri.

== Hanging ==
Slave executions

=== 1820s ===
Name	Race	Age	Sex	Date of execution	County	Crime	Victim(s)	Governor
William Short	White		M	April 27, 1824	Franklin	Murder	Gideon Gary, white	Alexander McNair
Luke Harris	Black		M	September 2, 1826	Cooper	Murder	Hezekiah Harris, white (owner)	John Miller
Hugh King	White		M	May 19, 1827	St. Louis	Murder	Martin Green, white	John Miller
Presley Morris	White		M	May 26, 1828	Cape Girardeau (Note: Change of venue from Scott County.)	Murder	Zack Nylie, white	John Miller
Annice	Black		F	August 23, 1828	Clay	Murder	Two of her children, black (Note: Serial killer, also murdered three other enslaved children.)	John Miller
Moses	Black		M	May 1829	Montgomery	Murder	John Tanner, white (owner)	John Miller
Michael Cogland	White		M	September 26, 1829	St. Louis	Murder		John Miller

=== 1830s ===
Name	Race	Age	Sex	Date of execution	County	Crime	Victim(s)	Governor
Jack Harris	Black		M	1830	Cooper	Murder	John Gabriel, white	John Miller
Jacob Stewart	White		M	April 13, 1830	Howard	Murder	Mr. Davidson, white	John Miller
James Jenkins	White		M	September 29, 1830	St. Louis	Murder		John Miller
Samuel Earles	White	62	M	December 13, 1831	Boone (Note: Change of venue from Ralls County.)	Murder	Charles B. Rouse, white	John Miller
Hampton	Black		M	March 23, 1832	Howard	Murder		John Miller
Isaac Whitson	White		M	January 30, 1833	Cape Girardeau	Murder	John M. Daniel, white	Daniel Dunklin
James Hubbard	White		M	January 31, 1834	St. Louis	Murder		Daniel Dunklin
Leland Tromley	White		M	April 4, 1833	Lafayette	Murder	James Stephens, white	Daniel Dunklin
Mary Andrews	White		F	April 30, 1834	Lafayette	Murder	Sarah Andrews, infant, white (daughter)	Daniel Dunklin
Conway	Black		M	April 8, 1836	Boone (Note: Change of venue.)	Murder-Robbery	Israel B. Grant, white (Jake's owner)	Daniel Dunklin
Jake	Black		M	June 20, 1836	Callaway	Murder-Robbery	Israel B. Grant, white (Jake's owner)	Daniel Dunklin
David	Black		M	August 1837	Howard	Murder		Lilburn Boggs
Washington	Black		M	August 1837	Howard	Murder		Lilburn Boggs
Henry	Black		M	August 11, 1837	Ray	Murder	Dorcas Clevenger, white	Lilburn Boggs
Ish	Black		M	August 11, 1837	Ray	Murder	Dorcas Clevenger, white	Lilburn Boggs
Mary	Black	19	F	September 30, 1838	Crawford	Murder	Vienna Brinker, 2, white	Lilburn Boggs
George Goster	White		M	May 10, 1839	Jackson	Murder		Lilburn Boggs
Henry Lane	White		M	August 14, 1839	Cole	Murder	Mr. Coatmire, white	Lilburn Boggs

=== 1840s ===
Name	Race	Age	Sex	Date of execution	County	Crime	Victim(s)	Governor
James Buchanan	White		M	January 3, 1840	St. Louis	Murder		Lilburn Boggs
Charles Brown	Black	27	M	July 9, 1841	St. Louis	Murder	Jesse Barker and Jacob Weaver, white	Thomas Reynolds
James Seward	Black		M	July 9, 1841	St. Louis	Murder	Jesse Barker and Jacob Weaver, white	Thomas Reynolds
Alfred Amos Warrick	Black	26	M	July 9, 1841	St. Louis	Murder	Jesse Barker and Jacob Weaver, white	Thomas Reynolds
Madison Henderson	Black	35	M	July 9, 1841	St. Louis	Murder	Jesse Barker and Jacob Weaver, white	Thomas Reynolds
Lewis	Black		M	August 7, 1841	Pike	Murder	Resin Mackey, white	Thomas Reynolds
Howard	White		M	August 13, 1841	Cooper	Murder		Thomas Reynolds
Ben White	White		M	August 13, 1841	Ray	Murder	Martin Adams, white	Thomas Reynolds
Joseph Savilia	White		M	January 28, 1842	Lafayette	Murder-Robbery	Unidentified male, white	Thomas Reynolds
William Berry	White		M	February 10, 1842	Cole	Murder		Thomas Reynolds
Dedimus Burr	White		M	July 8, 1842	Cole	Murder	Female, white (wife)	Thomas Reynolds
Henry Johnson	White		M	March 3, 1843	St. Louis	Murder-Robbery	Major Floyd, white	Thomas Reynolds
America	Black		F	June 10, 1843	Boone	Murder	Hiram Beasley, white (owner)	Thomas Reynolds
Henry	Black		M	June 10, 1843	Boone	Murder	Hiram Beasley, white (owner)	Thomas Reynolds
Conrad Myers	White		M	May 24, 1844	Crawford (Note: Change of venue from Shannon County.)	Murder	Sam B. Wingo, white (sheriff)	Meredith Miles Marmaduke
Joseph Brown	White		M	August 16, 1844	St. Louis (Federal)	Murder		Meredith Miles Marmaduke
John McDaniel	White		M	August 16, 1844	St. Louis (Federal)	Murder		Meredith Miles Marmaduke
John Lester	White		M	July 31, 1846	Henry (Note: Change of venue from Lafayette County.)	Murder	Scott D. King, white (father-in-law)	John Cummins Edwards
Nathan	Black		M	February 20, 1847	Cape Girardeau	Murder		John Cummins Edwards

=== 1850s ===
Name	Race	Age	Sex	Date of execution	County	Crime	Victim(s)	Governor
Ben	Black		M	January 11, 1850	Marion	Murder-Rape	Bright siblings (sister and brother), 14 and 10, white	Austin Augustus King
Hugh Gallagher	White		M	December 13, 1850	St. Louis	Murder	Mary Ann Crosby, white	Austin Augustus King
John Thomas	White		M	February 14, 1851	St. Louis	Murder	Michael Stevens, white	Austin Augustus King
Isaac	Black		M	November 14, 1851	Warren	Murder-Rape	Mrs. Squire Callihan, elderly, white	Austin Augustus King
Joel Elliott	White		M	September 10, 1852	Lafayette (Note: Change of venue from Cass County.)	Murder	William Smith, white	Austin Augustus King
Abe	Black		M	June 24, 1853	Platte	Murder	Dan, black (slave/overseer)	Sterling Price
John Schoen	White		M	July 22, 1853	St. Louis	Murder		Sterling Price
Joseph V. Dodge	White		M	July 22, 1853	St. Louis	Murder		Sterling Price
Augustus Otis Jennings	White		M	September 2, 1853	Buchanan	Murder	Edward H. Willard, white	Sterling Price
Willis Washam	White		M	August 25, 1854	Greene (Note: Change of venue from Taney County.)	Murder	Male, 14, white (stepson)	Sterling Price
John Huting	White		M	August 31, 1855	Montgomery	Murder	Caroline Scholton, white (love interest)	Sterling Price
Samuel Nottingham	White		M	November 23, 1855	Bates	Murder	Sarah Nottingham, white (wife)	Sterling Price
Celia	Black	20	F	December 21, 1855	Callaway	Murder (Note: Posthumously pardoned in 2024.)	Robert Newsome, white (owner)	Sterling Price
Henry	Black		M	July 11, 1856	Lafayette	Murder	John Winslow, white	Sterling Price
James Nichols	White		M	June 5, 1857	Johnson	Murder		Hancock Lee Jackson
Jacob Neuslein	White		M	June 19, 1857	St. Louis	Murder	Female, white (wife)	Hancock Lee Jackson
John La Pointe	White		M	June 19, 1857	St. Louis	Murder	Robert Wheaton, white	Hancock Lee Jackson
Israel Shoultz	White		M	June 19, 1857	St. Louis	Murder	Henry Inkamp, white	Hancock Lee Jackson
Edward Worrell	White	28	M	June 27, 1857	Franklin	Murder-Robbery	Basil H. Gordon, white	Hancock Lee Jackson
Joe	Black		M	November 13, 1857	Boone	Murder		Robert Marcellus Stewart
John Chapman	White		M	July 16, 1858	Howard	Murder		Robert Marcellus Stewart
Robert Shehane	White		M	August 7, 1858	Oregon (Note: Change of venue from Ripley County.)	Murder-Robbery	John Merrill, white	Robert Marcellus Stewart
Farrell	Black		M	December 31, 1858	Lafayette	Murder	Henry Nance, white (overseer)	Robert Marcellus Stewart
John	Black		M	December 31, 1858	Lafayette	Murder	Henry Nance, white (overseer)	Robert Marcellus Stewart
George	Black		M	January 7, 1859	Randolph	Murder		Robert Marcellus Stewart
George Lamb	White		M	June 17, 1859	St. Louis	Murder	Female, white (wife)	Robert Marcellus Stewart
Joseph Thornton	White	38	M	November 12, 1859	St. Louis	Murder	Joseph Charles, white	Robert Marcellus Stewart
Green	Black		M	December 2, 1859	Buchanan	Murder	Francis Marion Wright, white	Robert Marcellus Stewart

=== 1860s ===
Executions by firing squad

Name	Race	Age	Sex	Date of execution	County	Crime	Victim(s)	Governor
Samuel Brust	White		M	August 31, 1860	St. Louis	Murder	Mr. Schmidt, white	Robert Marcellus Stewart
John Baird	White		M	May 10, 1861	Lewis (Note: Change of venue from Clark County.)	Murder	James Whiteford, 52, white	Claiborne Fox Jackson
John Cole	White		M	July 14, 1861	Greene (Military)	Murder		Claiborne Fox Jackson
William Wilson	White	24	M	June 27, 1862	St. Louis	Murder-Burglary	John C. Gilmore, white (police officer)	Hamilton Rowan Gamble
Calvin Sartain	White		M	August 15, 1862	Linn	Murder		Hamilton Rowan Gamble
Unknown	Black		M	September 6, 1862	Ray	Attempted rape		Hamilton Rowan Gamble
Michael Kearns	White		M	January 23, 1863	St. Louis	Murder	Robert Baker, white	Hamilton Rowan Gamble
James Edmonds	White		M	March 6, 1863	Jefferson	Murder	John Bridgeman, white	Hamilton Rowan Gamble
Joseph Burns	White	26	M	May 8, 1863	St. Louis	Murder-Burglary	John C. Gilmore, white (police officer)	Hamilton Rowan Gamble
Henry	Black	20	M	August 28, 1863	Moniteau	Murder	Alfred N. Norman, white (owner)	Hamilton Rowan Gamble
William Linville	White	19	M	November 6, 1863	Buchanan	Murder	Mr. Burns, white	Hamilton Rowan Gamble
Valentine Hansen	White	35	M	April 16, 1864	St. Louis	Murder	Mr. Ellig, white	Willard Preble Hall
John Reilly	White		M	April 29, 1864	Johnson	Murder		Willard Preble Hall
Joseph Lanier	White		M	June 10, 1864	Andrew (Military)	Sedition		Willard Preble Hall
Peter Keiffe	White	27	M	October 7, 1864	Greene (Military)	Murder	A civilian	Willard Preble Hall
John Abshire	White	21	M	October 17, 1864	St. Louis (Military)	Murder	William Hayes, white	Willard Preble Hall
Jefferson Jackson	White		M	October 29, 1864	Buchanan (Military)	Murder	Male, white	Willard Preble Hall
Abraham Purvis	White	18	M	January 13, 1865	St. Louis (Military)	Murder	A civilian	Thomas Clement Fletcher
Ephraim Richardson	White	16	M	January 13, 1865	St. Louis (Military)	Murder	A civilian	Thomas Clement Fletcher
Green Willis	Black	35	M	March 1, 1866	Buchanan	Murder-Robbery	Jacob Kuhn, white (Note: Also murdered John L. Lahr (40, white) in a similar crime.)	Thomas Clement Fletcher
Zeke Hart	White	20	M	October 19, 1866	Morgan	Murder-Burglary	Ross Saltimer, white	Thomas Clement Fletcher
Thomas Blue	Black	20	M	June 21, 1867	Monroe	Murder	William Madison and Sarah Cowherd Vandeventer, 59 and 46, white (Note: On August 25, 1889, Perry Thrall made a deathbed confession to being the actual murderer.)	Thomas Clement Fletcher
Peter Christman	White	18	M	December 6, 1867	St. Louis	Murder-Robbery	Edward and Moses Ross, 30 and 4, white	Thomas Clement Fletcher
Alfred Hughes	Black		M	July 24, 1868	Clinton (Note: Change of venue from Platte County.)	Murder	Daniel W. Jenkins, 25, white	Thomas Clement Fletcher
William Edwards	Black	23	M	July 23, 1869	St. Louis	Murder	Louis Wilson, 26, black	Joseph W. McClurg

=== 1870s ===
Name	Race	Age	Sex	Date of execution	County or City	Crime	Victim(s)	Governor
John Skaggs	White	33	M	August 6, 1870	Stoddard (Note: Change of venue from Dunklin County.)	Murder	Robert Vinkler Richardson, 49, white	Joseph W. McClurg
John Grable	White	32	M	September 9, 1870	Buchanan	Murder-Robbery	Joel Drake, 36, white (brother-in-law)	Joseph W. McClurg
Jeremiah Bailey	White	20	M	December 13, 1870	New Madrid	Murder	James Brock, 24, white	Joseph W. McClurg
John Armstrong	Black	32	M	January 27, 1871	Washington	Murder-Rape	Five people, white and mixed (Note: David Lepine (50, white), his two female housemates Louisa and Mary Christopher (white), and their two respective children, a 1-year-old boy and a 1-year-old girl (mixed, paternal ethnicities unknown). The Christopher sisters were also raped.)	Benjamin Gratz Brown
Charles Jolly	Black	32	M	January 27, 1871	Washington	Murder-Rape	Five people, white and mixed	Benjamin Gratz Brown
Charles Waller	White	42	M	May 17, 1872	Webster	Murder-Robbery	Newlan family, white (Note: William Newlan, his wife Hannah, and their 1-year-old child. The infant's body was never found.)	Benjamin Gratz Brown
Robert Champion	Black	42	M	February 21, 1873	Howard	Murder	Rachel Champion, 47, black (wife)	Silas Woodson
Samuel Walker	Black		M	May 15, 1874	Clay	Murder	Katie Walker, black (wife)	Silas Woodson
John Carlisle	White	20	M	July 24, 1874	Saline	Murder	George Wecker, white	Silas Woodson
Joseph Hamilton	White	21	M	October 30, 1874	Harrison	Murder	Elisha W. Halleck, 48, white	Silas Woodson
Patrick O'Shea	White	36	M	April 9, 1875	St. Louis	Murder	Eliza Walsh O'Shea, 34, white (wife)	Charles Henry Hardin
Travis Harris	White	39	M	April 16, 1875	Scott	Murder	Squire Masterson, 56, white (father-in-law) (Note: Also previously murdered Buck McLeod (white) in front of the Scott County Courthouse but avoided prosecution.)	Charles Henry Hardin
Henry Brown	Black	25	M	October 22, 1875	St. Louis	Murder-Burglary	Philip Pfarr, 54, white (Note: Also raped Pfarr's wife.)	Charles Henry Hardin
Henry Hallenschied	White	54	M	December 17, 1875	Gasconade	Murder	Christian Albrand, 28, white (son-in-law)	Charles Henry Hardin
Antonio Catalano	White	40	M	February 18, 1876	St. Louis	Murder	Francisco Palermo, 25, white	Charles Henry Hardin
Dominico Damina	White	28	M	February 18, 1876	St. Louis	Murder	Francisco Palermo, 25, white	Charles Henry Hardin
Bastiano Lombardo	White	21	M	February 18, 1876	St. Louis	Murder	Francisco Palermo, 25, white	Charles Henry Hardin
William Foster	White	26	M	June 19, 1876	Warren	Murder-Robbery	Unidentified male, black	Charles Henry Hardin
Daniel Price	Black	33	M	January 18, 1877	Warren	Murder	Samuel Taylor, black	John S. Phelps
William Pints	White	32	M	April 27, 1877	Bollinger	Murder-Rape	Catherine Burr, 9, white	John S. Phelps
Samuel Orr	White	15	M	May 18, 1877	Lawrence	Murder	George Davis, 55, white	John S. Phelps
Poindexter Edmundson	White	24	M	July 13, 1877	Stoddard	Murder	William Shaw, 39, white	John S. Phelps
William Wieners	White	21	M	February 1, 1878	St. Louis City	Murder	Americus Vespucius Lawrence, 27, white	John S. Phelps
John Ables	White	58	M	February 15, 1878	Jasper (Note: Change of venue from McDonald County.)	Murder	John L. Lane, 24, white	John S. Phelps
John Daniels	White	35	M	March 1, 1878	Johnson (Note: Change of venue from Pettis County.)	Murder-Robbery	Jesse R. Miller, 35, white	John S. Phelps
Richard Green	White	27	M	March 1, 1878	Jackson	Murder	Henry H. Hughes, white (deputy marshal)	John S. Phelps
Richard Isaacs	White	36	M	October 25, 1878	Cass	Murder-Robbery	Henderson B. Clark, 35, white	John S. Phelps
John West	White	23	M	May 16, 1879	Cooper	Murder-Robbery	Frank Shinn, 28, white	John S. Phelps
Monroe Guy	Black	21	M	June 6, 1879	Jefferson	Murder	Aaron McPete, black	John S. Phelps
John Blan	White	23	M	June 6, 1879	St. Charles	Murder	Elijah H. Warren, 38, white (brother-in-law)	John S. Phelps
Frank Davidson	White	24	M	July 9, 1879	Johnson	Murder	William Haggerty, 24, white	John S. Phelps

=== 1880s ===
Name	Race	Age	Sex	Date of execution	County or City	Crime	Victim(s)	Governor
Charles Hardin	White	21	M	January 23, 1880	St. Francois	Murder-Robbery	Robert Ferguson, 34, white	John S. Phelps
Joseph Core	White	34	M	March 5, 1880	Laclede	Murder	George E. King, 52, white	John S. Phelps
John Kilgore	White	23	M	March 5, 1880	Audrain	Murder	Lorenzo Dow Willingham, 39, white	John S. Phelps
William Barton	Black	16	M	March 26, 1880	St. Charles	Murder	James Clutterbuck, 26, white	John S. Phelps
Nathan Faucett	Black	35	M	April 16, 1880	Audrain	Murder	Octave Lewis Inlow, 29, white	John S. Phelps
Jacob Muldrow	Black	19	M	April 16, 1880	Audrain	Murder	Octave Lewis Inlow, 29, white	John S. Phelps
Edward Nugent	White	46	M	April 23, 1880	St. Louis City	Murder	Ella Nugent, 40, white (wife)	John S. Phelps
Henry Redemeier	White	31	M	April 23, 1880	St. Louis City	Murder	Franz Vosz, 55, white	John S. Phelps
John Cropp	Black	25	M	June 11, 1880	Chariton	Murder	Noah Forrest, 24, white	John S. Phelps
Thomas Benton Hopper	White	36	M	June 25, 1880	Dade (Note: Change of venue from Cedar County.)	Murder-Robbery	Samuel C. Ham, 23, white	John S. Phelps
James Brown	White	23	M	June 25, 1880	Randolph	Murder	Martha E. Parish, 58, white (mother-in-law)	John S. Phelps
Frank Brown	White		M	July 15, 1881	New Madrid	Murder	Robert D. LaFarge, 24, white (posse member) (Note: Also previously murdered Wayne County sheriff John Thomas Davis (25, white).)	Thomas Theodore Crittenden
Jesse Meyer	White		M	July 15, 1881	New Madrid	Murder	Robert D. LaFarge, 24, white (posse member)	Thomas Theodore Crittenden
Albert Talbott	White	21	M	July 22, 1881	Nodaway	Murder	Dr. Perry H. Talbott, 53, white (father)	Thomas Theodore Crittenden
Charles Talbott	White	16	M	July 22, 1881	Nodaway	Murder	Dr. Perry H. Talbott, 53, white (father)	Thomas Theodore Crittenden
John Patterson	White	19	M	July 22, 1881	Henry	Murder-Robbery	James G. Clark, 50, white	Thomas Theodore Crittenden
William Erb	White	49	M	December 30, 1881	St. Louis City	Murder	Rose Mion, 47, white (common-law wife)	Thomas Theodore Crittenden
John Phelps	White	21	M	January 6, 1882	Saline	Murder	Elijah Keyton, 62, white	Thomas Theodore Crittenden
Charley Ellis	Black	24	M	January 6, 1882	St. Louis City	Murder	Mack Sanders, 21, black	Thomas Theodore Crittenden
Joseph W. Kotovsky	White	24	M	January 6, 1882	St. Louis City	Murder	Augusta Simon, 19, white (love interest)	Thomas Theodore Crittenden
Thaddeus Bober	White	31	M	January 13, 1882	St. Louis City	Murder	Fredericka and Lena Schuendler (girlfriend), 52 and 23, white	Thomas Theodore Crittenden
William Ward	Black	27	M	January 13, 1882	St. Louis City	Murder	Annie Lewis, 15, black (girlfriend)	Thomas Theodore Crittenden
George Bohannon	White	20	M	April 21, 1882	Phelps	Murder	William Light, 21, white	Thomas Theodore Crittenden
Alfred Saunders	Black		M	December 8, 1882	Mississippi	Murder	Moses Wing, 25, black	Thomas Theodore Crittenden
Howard Underwood	Black	60	M	April 6, 1883	Mississippi	Murder	Isabelle Lucas, 36, black (lover)	Thomas Theodore Crittenden
William Fox	White	22	M	December 28, 1883	Vernon	Murder	William Thomas Howard, 36, white	Thomas Theodore Crittenden
Matt Lewis	Black	38	M	March 14, 1884	St. Louis City	Murder	Mary Ann Lewis, 22, black (wife)	Thomas Theodore Crittenden
Thomas Dixon	White		M	May 2, 1884	Stoddard	Murder	James McNabb, white	Thomas Theodore Crittenden
Bill Hamilton	White	28	M	July 11, 1884	Johnson	Murder-Robbery	Carl Steidle, 25, white	Thomas Theodore Crittenden
Charley Hamilton	White	20	M	July 11, 1884	Johnson	Murder-Robbery	Carl Steidle, 25, white	Thomas Theodore Crittenden
Oliver Bateman	White	19	M	November 21, 1884	Andrew	Murder-Rape	Austie and Adella McLaughlin, 9 and 7, white	Thomas Theodore Crittenden
Samuel Collins	White	23	M	August 28, 1885	Pike	Murder	Owen Utterback, 39, white	John S. Marmaduke
Henry Stair	White	35	M	January 15, 1886	Vernon	Murder-Robbery	Jacob and Mack Sewell, 55 and 16, white	John S. Marmaduke
Charles Wilson	Black	24	M	January 15, 1886	St. Louis City	Murder	Willie A. David, 24, white	John S. Marmaduke
Jeff Wilson	Black	26	M	April 2, 1886	Lafayette	Murder	Jennie Sanford, 27, black (girlfriend)	John S. Marmaduke
Joseph Jump	White	19	M	July 23, 1886	Daviess	Murder-Robbery	William C. Gladson, 40, white	John S. Marmaduke
John Smith	White	21	M	August 6, 1886	Daviess	Murder-Robbery	William C. Gladson, 40, white	John S. Marmaduke
Robert Grayor	Black	25	M	December 10, 1886	St. Louis City	Murder	Berry Evans, 35, black	John S. Marmaduke
Edward Clumm	White	45	M	April 15, 1887	Barry	Murder	John J. White and Ella Bowe, 48 and 17, white	John S. Marmaduke
Daniel Jewell	Black	24	M	April 15, 1887	St. Louis City	Murder	Ellen Jewell, 16, black (wife)	John S. Marmaduke
Edward Sneed	White	29	M	June 24, 1887	Jackson	Murder	Orleans Harrison Loomis, 19, white	John S. Marmaduke
Alfred Blunt	Black	32	M	June 24, 1887	St. Louis City	Murder	Mary Blunt, 24, black (wife)	John S. Marmaduke
Peter Hronek	White	32	M	June 29, 1888	Buchanan	Murder	Anna Hronek, 27, white (wife)	Albert P. Morehouse
George Rider	White	25	M	July 13, 1888	Saline	Murder	Rousey Peter Tallent, 34, white	Albert P. Morehouse
Walter Maxwell	White	26	M	August 10, 1888	St. Louis City	Murder-Robbery	Charles Arthur Preller, 32, white	Albert P. Morehouse
Henry Landgraff	White	30	M	August 10, 1888	St. Louis City	Murder	Annie Fisch, 22, white (girlfriend)	Albert P. Morehouse
John Matthews	White	41	M	May 10, 1889	Christian	Murder	Charles Green and William Edmens, 42 and 27, white	David R. Francis
Dave Walker	White	45	M	May 10, 1889	Christian	Murder	Charles Green and William Edmens, 42 and 27, white	David R. Francis
William Walker	White	19	M	May 10, 1889	Christian	Murder	Charles Green and William Edmens, 42 and 27, white	David R. Francis

=== 1890s ===
Name	Race	Age	Sex	Date of execution	County or City	Crime	Victim(s)	Governor
John Oscar Turlington	White	26	M	March 6, 1891	Cooper	Murder	Thomas C. Cranmer, 54, white (sheriff)	David R. Francis
Webster Jackson	White	23	M	April 25, 1891	Gasconade (Note: Change of venue from Franklin County.)	Murder-Robbery	Alexander McVicker, 50, white	David R. Francis
William Price	Black	24	M	May 8, 1891	Saline	Rape (Note: The victim later committed suicide.)	Alicia Ninas, 19, white	David R. Francis
Henry Henson	White	36	M	August 13, 1891	St. Louis City	Murder	Ida Kreitling Henson, 35, white (wife)	David R. Francis
Chris Young	White	26	M	August 13, 1891	Lafayette	Murder	Stephen Ferguson, 30, white	David R. Francis
Louis Bulling	White	23	M	September 4, 1891	Andrew	Murder	Flora Brown Bulling, 19, white (wife)	David R. Francis
Thomas Williamson	White	60	M	October 31, 1891	Pettis	Murder	Jefferson and Charles Moore, 58 and 29, white	David R. Francis
Charles Seaton	White	17	M	December 4, 1891	Lawrence	Murder-Robbery	Lewis Channell, 17, white	David R. Francis
W. V. Harbin	White	40	M	January 15, 1892	Butler	Murder	A. L. Smith, elderly, white	David R. Francis
William McCoy	Black	33	M	February 16, 1893	Lafayette	Murder	Mollie Magruder, 38, black (girlfriend)	William J. Stone
Amos Avery	White	18	M	May 24, 1893	Barton	Murder-Robbery	James A. Miles, 20, white	William J. Stone
Joseph Howell	White	20	M	August 10, 1893	Grundy (Note: Change of venue from Linn County.)	Murder	Five people, white (Note: Minnie Hall (31, pregnant) and her four children: William (9), May (7), Nettie (5), and Roy (2).)	William J. Stone
Dick Robinson	Black	25	M	December 15, 1893	Pettis	Murder-Rape	Johanna Schollmann, 24, white (Note: Schollman was pregnant at time of crime.)	William J. Stone
Charles Bank	Black	27	M	December 29, 1893	Johnson	Murder	Isaac Palmer, 22, black	William J. Stone
Martin Reed	Black	65	M	January 5, 1894	Jackson	Murder	Hester Reed, 50, black (wife)	William J. Stone
Samuel Wilson	White	42	M	January 12, 1894	St. Louis City	Murder	Clementina Manning, 33, white (ex-girlfriend)	William J. Stone
Wilson Howard	White	31	M	January 19, 1894	Laclede (Note: Change of venue from Maries County.)	Murder-Robbery	Thomas McMichaels, white (Note: Ringleader of the Howard-Turner Feud in Harlan County, Kentucky with at least one previous murder attributed directly to him.)	William J. Stone
Charles Wisdom	Black	23	M	April 13, 1894	St. Louis	Murder-Robbery	Edward A. Drexler, 45, white	William J. Stone
John Coleman	Black	40	M	May 4, 1894	Cole	Murder	Frank Macklin, white (Note: Murdered in the state penitentiary where he worked a civilian foreman for the shoemaker shop.)	William J. Stone
Harry Jones	White	29	M	June 29, 1894	Jackson	Murder-Robbery	Jane Wright, 56, white	William J. Stone
William Kicksher	White	36	M	June 29, 1894	Jackson	Murder-Robbery	Jane Wright, 56, white	William J. Stone
Charles Wilson	Black	27	M	July 26, 1894	St. Louis City	Murder	Moses Hodges, 21, black	William J. Stone
Harrison Duncan	Black	27	M	July 27, 1894	St. Louis (Note: Change of venue from St. Louis City.)	Murder	James Brady, 31, white (police officer)	William J. Stone
Phillip Martin	Black	17	M	February 2, 1895	Jackson	Murder	Eli Stillwell, 34, white	William J. Stone
Joseph Barries	Black	19	M	May 11, 1895	Buchanan	Rape	Bertha Potter, 7, white	William J. Stone
James Murray	Black	24	M	May 11, 1895	St. Louis	Murder-Robbery	Edgar Fitzwilliams, 18, white	William J. Stone
Edward Murray	Black	22	M	May 11, 1895	Gasconade (Note: Change of venue.)	Murder-Robbery	Edgar Fitzwilliams, 18, white	William J. Stone
Emile Davis	White	34	M	February 15, 1896	Osage	Murder	Frank Henderson, 24, white	William J. Stone
James Fitzgerald	White	27	M	February 20, 1896	St. Louis City	Murder	Annie Naessens, 18, white (girlfriend)	William J. Stone
John Nelson	White		M	February 28, 1896	Marion	Murder	Mary Stull and John Stull Hughes, 56 and 35, white	William J. Stone
William Taylor	White		M	April 30, 1896	Linn	Murder	Meeks family, white (Note: Gus Meeks, his wife, and two of their three daughters. The third survived her injuries.)	William J. Stone
William Wright	Black		M	August 10, 1896	Vernon	Murder	Betty Wright, black (wife)	William J. Stone
George Anderson	White		M	August 21, 1896	Macon	Murder	Female, white (wife)	William J. Stone
James Inks	White	44	M	January 30, 1897	Holt	Murder	John Patterson, 58, white	Lawrence Vest Stephens
Edward Perry	White	23	M	January 30, 1897	Douglas	Murder-Robbery	Sawyer family (three people), white (Note: Lafayette Sawyer, his wife Sarah (both 66), and their son Ernest (27).)	Lawrence Vest Stephens
Peter Schmidt	White	16	M	February 16, 1897	St. Louis	Murder-Robbery	Bertram Atwater, 33, white	Lawrence Vest Stephens
Samuel Foster	Black	22	M	February 16, 1897	St. Louis	Murder-Robbery	Bertram Atwater, 33, white	Lawrence Vest Stephens
Arthur Duestrow	White	24	M	February 16, 1897	Franklin (Note: Change of venue from the City of St. Louis.)	Murder	Albertine and Louis Duestrow, 29 and 2, white (wife and son)	Lawrence Vest Stephens
James Pollard	Black	21	M	June 25, 1897	Buchanan	Murder	Joseph Irvine, 42, black (Note: Intended to murder Irvine's younger brother.)	Lawrence Vest Stephens
Henry Johnson	Black	27	M	November 18, 1897	St. Louis City	Murder	William Amend, 21, white	Lawrence Vest Stephens
William Carr	White	37	M	December 17, 1897	Clay	Murder	Belle Carr, 3, white (daughter)	Lawrence Vest Stephens
Tobe Lanahan	Black	26	M	June 22, 1898	Cole	Murder-Rape	Millie Gaines, 12, black	Lawrence Vest Stephens
Ed McKinzie	Black	28	M	June 22, 1898	Cole	Murder-Robbery	Nicholas Linhardt, 49, white	Lawrence Vest Stephens
John Thomascheutz	White	26	M	June 22, 1898	St. Louis City	Murder	Annie Rausch, 18, white (love interest)	Lawrence Vest Stephens
James Albright	White	21	M	July 9, 1898	Mississippi	Murder	George Seth Elliott, 45, white (district attorney) (Note: Murdered while attempting to arrest Albright and his 18-year-old brother Joseph for the murder of their brother-in-law Isaac Large. Unconfirmed reports also claim he murdered a schoolmate with a baseball bat at age 8.)	Lawrence Vest Stephens
George Thompson	Black	29	M	August 1, 1898	St. Louis City	Murder	Joseph Cunningham, 32, white	Lawrence Vest Stephens
James Brown	Black	29	M	December 28, 1898	Jackson	Murder	Henry Prather, 28, black	Lawrence Vest Stephens
Ira Sexton	White	23	M	December 28, 1898	Mercer	Murder-Robbery	Nathan W. Stark, 26, white	Lawrence Vest Stephens
Oscar Baker	White	50	M	January 10, 1899	Shannon	Murder	Annie Baker, 45, white (wife)	Lawrence Vest Stephens
James Reed	Black	22	M	March 30, 1899	Jackson	Murder	Susie Blakely, 26, black (girlfriend)	Lawrence Vest Stephens
Edwin Soper	White	35	M	March 30, 1899	Cass	Murder	Adelia Hunt Soper, 34 white (Note: Also murdered their two children, Maud (5) and Gillis (2). Previously murdered his father, John Lewis Soper (50), in Kearney in 1880 and a previous son (2) in Portland, Oregon in 1897.)	Lawrence Vest Stephens
Matthew Hancock	Black	23	M	April 8, 1899	St. Louis City	Murder	George Horton, 31, white	Lawrence Vest Stephens
Fred Bronstein	White	47	M	May 8, 1899	Clark	Murder	Amelia Jane Rowe Bronstein, 33, white (wife)	Lawrence Vest Stephens
William Burns	Black	25	M	May 29, 1899	Scott	Murder	Maggie Gregory Burns, black (wife)	Lawrence Vest Stephens
Peter Kindred	White	22	M	June 7, 1899	Mercer	Murder	Andrew A. Alley, 27, white (Note: Also maimed Joseph V. Alley (23, white) during the same crime.)	Lawrence Vest Stephens
Freeman Cochran	White	37	M	June 7, 1899	Harrison	Murder	George Stanbrough, 30, white	Lawrence Vest Stephens
John Headrick	White	19	M	June 15, 1899	Cape Girardeau	Murder	James Madison Lail, 44, white	Lawrence Vest Stephens
Carroll Rice	White	33	M	June 15, 1899	Oregon	Murder	Mary C. Rice, 20, white (wife)	Lawrence Vest Stephens
James McAfee	White	33	M	July 6, 1899	Jasper	Murder-Robbery	Eben M. Brewer, 24, white	Lawrence Vest Stephens

=== 1900s ===
Name	Race	Age	Sex	Date of execution	County or City	Crime	Victim(s)	Governor
James Nettles	Black	27	M	May 7, 1900	St. Louis City	Murder	Samuel W. Mann, 46, white	Lawrence Vest Stephens
Ernest Clevenger	White	28	M	June 15, 1900	Clay	Murder	George Allen and Della Clevenger (third cousin), 29 and 32, white	Lawrence Vest Stephens
John Holloway	White	35	M	June 15, 1900	Osage	Murder	Julius Boillot, 27, white	Lawrence Vest Stephens
Samuel Walters	Black	39	M	June 15, 1900	New Madrid	Murder	Frank and Millie Holmes, black	Lawrence Vest Stephens
Noah McGinnis	White	27	M	December 31, 1900	Bates	Murder-Robbery	Frederick Borcherding, white	Lawrence Vest Stephens
James H. Tettaton	White	29	M	February 19, 1901	Dunklin	Murder	Melinda Smith Tettalon, 43, white (stepmother) (Note: Also murdered her children George, Ben, Ada, and Ida (6 to 12).)	Alexander Monroe Dockery
Milo Gregory	White	23	M	March 21, 1901	Dunklin	Murder	Joseph Covert, white	Alexander Monroe Dockery
Ellsworth Evans	Black	18	M	April 12, 1901	Cooper	Murder	William L. Hennicke, 40+, white (Boonville police officer)	Alexander Monroe Dockery
Ernest Reed	Black		M	July 5, 1901	Jasper	Murder	Amanda Gertrude Reed, 27, black (wife)	Alexander Monroe Dockery
Joshua Craft	White	25	M	January 21, 1902	Cole	Murder	Henry Spieker, 25, white (police officer) (Note: State prison escapee, serving time for train robbery. Spieker was in a posse pursuing him.)	Alexander Monroe Dockery
Albert Garth	Black	26	M	January 21, 1902	Jackson	Murder	Minnie Woods, black	Alexander Monroe Dockery
Henry Flutcher	Black	26	M	April 11, 1902	St. Louis City	Murder	Louis Roth, 24, white	Alexander Monroe Dockery
James Jackson	Black	28	M	April 11, 1902	Jackson	Murder	Prophet Everett, 24, black	Alexander Monroe Dockery
General Armstrong	Black	18	M	April 25, 1902	Platte	Rape-Robbery	Ivy Turney, 16, white	Alexander Monroe Dockery
Charles Reeves	Black	27	M	May 23, 1902	Cooper	Murder	Mamie Smith Reeves, 22, black (wife)	Alexander Monroe Dockery
Sam Brown	White	29	M	June 27, 1902	Wayne	Murder-Robbery	George T. Richardson, 50+, white	Alexander Monroe Dockery
Jesse Johnson	Black	24	M	September 12, 1902	Ralls	Murder-Robbery	Marcus D. McRae, 71, white	Alexander Monroe Dockery
Thomas Dunn	Black	27	M	January 2, 1903	St. Louis City	Murder	Peter Jackson, 45, black	Alexander Monroe Dockery
Charles Gurley	Black	26	M	February 3, 1903	St. Louis City	Murder	Rosa Higgins, 20, black (girlfriend)	Alexander Monroe Dockery
Steven Clark	White	36	M	February 6, 1903	Butler	Murder	Pearl Clark, 26, white (wife) (Note: Name possibly unconfirmed.)	Alexander Monroe Dockery
James Gartrell	White	68	M	April 17, 1903	Bates	Murder-Robbery	D. B. Donegan, black (Note: Name unconfirmed.)	Alexander Monroe Dockery
Charles May	White	25	M	April 17, 1903	Buchanan	Murder	Robert Martin, 31, white (Note: Previously sentenced to death for the murder of William J. Burdette in 1896 but had his sentence reduced on appeal.)	Alexander Monroe Dockery
John Taylor	White	20	M	April 17, 1903	Jackson	Murder	Ruth Nollard, 18, white	Alexander Monroe Dockery
Henry Wilson	Black	20	M	May 8, 1903	St. Louis City	Murder-Robbery	Thomas Mooney, 63, white	Alexander Monroe Dockery
Sampson Gray	Black	21	M	May 8, 1903	St. Louis City	Murder-Robbery	George Jones, 34, black	Alexander Monroe Dockery
Frank Clark	Mixed (Note: Half Hispanic and half Native American ("half-breed Indian and Mexican"). Speculated to possibly be mulatto.)	23	M	November 25, 1903	Clark	Rape	Olla Hess, 16, white	Alexander Monroe Dockery
John Robinson	White	40	M	January 15, 1904	Adair	Murder	George W. Conkle, 58, white (father-in-law)	Alexander Monroe Dockery
Mark Dunn	White	36	M	March 11, 1904	Buchanan	Murder	Alfred M. Fenton, 25, white	Alexander Monroe Dockery
George Collins	White	23	M	March 26, 1904	Franklin	Murder	Charles J. Schumacher, 35, white (Pinkerton detective)	Alexander Monroe Dockery
Elias Smith	White	40	M	April 21, 1905	Pulaski	Murder-Robbery	James H. Smith, 25, white	Joseph W. Folk
Bill Rudolph	White	20	M	May 8, 1905	Franklin	Murder	Charles J. Schumacher, 35, white (Pinkerton detective)	Joseph W. Folk
Allen Henderson	Black	17	M	June 15, 1905	St. Charles	Murder	Joseph Buckner, 58, black	Joseph W. Folk
Henry Heusack	White	55	M	August 21, 1905	St. Louis City	Murder	August Raphael, 75, white (father-in-law)	Joseph W. Folk
Mitlon Diltwer	White	44	M	February 11, 1906	St. Louis City	Murder-Robbery	Ray Williams, white	Joseph W. Folk
Curtis Jackson	Black	16	M	March 23, 1906	Butler	Rape	Annie Norman, 28, white	Joseph W. Folk
Edward Bateman	Black	22	M	August 7, 1906	Lawrence	Rape	Myrtle Digby, 20, white	Joseph W. Folk
Jody Hamilton	White	20	M	December 21, 1906	Texas	Murder	Parsons family (five people), white	Joseph W. Folk
William Church	White	25	M	January 10, 1907	Warren	Murder	Henry W. and Nettie Yeater, 66 and 59, white (foster parents)	Joseph W. Folk
Edward Raymond	White	23	M	June 27, 1907	Cole	Murder	Ephraim Allison and John A. Clay, 69 and 46, white (guards) (Note: Murdered during an escape from the state penitentiary.)	Joseph W. Folk
George Ryan	White	24	M	June 27, 1907	Cole	Murder	Ephraim Allison and John A. Clay, 69 and 46, white (guards)	Joseph W. Folk
Harry Vaughn	White	33	M	June 27, 1907	Cole	Murder	Ephraim Allison and John A. Clay, 69 and 46, white (guards)	Joseph W. Folk
John King	Black	19	M	June 27, 1907	St. Louis City	Murder	Hallie Douglas, 20, black (girlfriend)	Joseph W. Folk
William Jefferies	White	28	M	June 4, 1908	St. Charles	Murder-Robbery	William Wussler, 32, white	Joseph W. Folk
Albert Filley	White	32	M	September 21, 1908	Caldwell	Murder	Three people, white (Note: His wife Fannie Riley Filley (28), their daughter Dolly (7), and his brother Henry Clay Filley (37).)	Joseph W. Folk
Claude Brooks	Black	21	M	July 30, 1909	Jackson	Murder	Sidney Herndon, 46, white	Herbert S. Hadley

=== 1910s ===
Name	Race	Age	Sex	Date of execution	County or City	Crime	Victim(s)	Governor
George Reynolds	Black	22	M	February 8, 1910	Jackson	Rape	Matilda Taylor Jackson, 27, white	Herbert S. Hadley
John Williams	Black	23	M	February 8, 1910	Jackson	Rape	Matilda Taylor Jackson, 27, white	Herbert S. Hadley
William Wilson	Black	24	M	March 4, 1910	Jasper	Murder-Rape	Millie Plumb, 25, white	Herbert S. Hadley
George Jackson	Black	18	M	June 10, 1910	Mississippi	Rape	Isophrenia Henderson, 60, white	Herbert S. Hadley
Robert Davis	Black	24	M	June 10, 1910	Jackson	Murder	Harry H. Evans, 17, black	Herbert S. Hadley
Hezekiah Rasco	White	32	M	March 26, 1912	Nodaway	Murder	Hubbell family (four people), white (Note: Oda Hubbell (29), his wife Clara E. (29), daughter Jessie O. (6), and son Welton O. (4). Previously raped and murdered Kate Baumley (36, white) at age 16.)	Herbert S. Hadley
John Robinson	Black	48	M	February 15, 1915	Jackson	Murder	Mary Felton Robinson and Alma Felton, 48 and 11, black (wife and stepdaughter) (Note: Previously murdered Ella Jones (25, black) in St. Louis in 1896.)	Elliott Woolfolk Major
William Sprouse	White	41	M	July 16, 1915	St. Louis	Murder	Anna Sprouse, 37, white (wife)	Elliott Woolfolk Major
Andrew Black	Black	23	M	August 8, 1916	St. Charles	Murder	James David Lamb, 41, white (police officer) (Note: Also murdered police officer John D. Blair (41, white) during the same crime.)	Elliott Woolfolk Major
Harry Black	Black	25	M	August 8, 1916	St. Charles	Murder	James David Lamb, 41, white (police officer)	Elliott Woolfolk Major

=== 1920s ===
Name	Race	Age	Sex	Date of execution	County or City	Crime	Victim(s)	Governor
Adam Jackson	Black	39	M	March 26, 1920	Butler	Rape	Emma Mann, 45, white	Frederick D. Gardner
Charles Jocoy	White	23	M	August 12, 1921	Franklin	Murder	Benjamin Schobe, 24, white	Arthur M. Hyde
Walker Lee	Black	37	M	August 17, 1921	Jackson	Rape (Note: The victim later died as a result of the attack.)	Elizabeth Whete Dahmn, 52, white	Arthur M. Hyde
John Carroll	White	24	M	September 12, 1921	Franklin	Murder	Benjamin Schobe, 24, white	Arthur M. Hyde
Sterling Jackson	Black	21	M	August 3, 1923	Jasper	Murder-Robbery	George Babcock, 66, white	Arthur M. Hyde
Ralph Long	Black	19	M	August 3, 1923	Jasper	Murder-Robbery	George Babcock, 66, white	Arthur M. Hyde
Hugh Pinkley	White	35	M	July 18, 1924	St. Louis City	Murder	Michael O'Connor, 44, white (patrolman) (Note: Also murdered police officer Bernard C. Mengel (52, white) during the same crime.)	Arthur M. Hyde
Charles Merrill	White	21	M	July 18, 1924	St. Louis City	Murder	Michael O'Connor, 44, white (patrolman)	Arthur M. Hyde
James Crump	Black	25	M	July 17, 1925	Montgomery (Note: Change of venue from Audrain County.)	Murder	Chalmus Lee Blum, 54, white (sheriff)	Sam Aaron Baker
Leon Williams	Black	27	M	July 17, 1925	St. Louis City	Murder-Robbery	Harry Leonard, 43, white	Sam Aaron Baker
Robert Johnson	Black	29	M	February 28, 1927	St. Louis	Rape	Mabel L. Faenger, 26, white	Sam Aaron Baker
Leonard Yeager	White	31	M	February 1, 1929	St. Louis City	Murder-Robbery	Gunerius Schou, 62, white	Henry S. Caulfield
Thomas Lowry	White	23	M	February 1, 1929	St. Louis City	Murder	Eugene N. Lovely, 23, white (motorcycle patrolman)	Henry S. Caulfield

=== 1930s ===
Name	Race	Age	Sex	Date of execution	County or City	Crime	Victim(s)	Governor
William Mosley	Black	54	M	January 31, 1930	St. Louis City	Murder	Mildred White, 32, black (common-law wife) (Note: Also murdered storekeeper Marcus Bass and his wife Beckey (53 and 44, white) during the same crime.)	Henry S. Caulfield
Lawrence Mabry	White	20	M	January 31, 1930	Cooper (Note: Change of venue from Pettis County.)	Murder-Robbery	William Busch, 23, white	Henry S. Caulfield
Carl Nasello	White	20	M	July 25, 1930	Jackson	Murder-Robbery	James Horace Smith, 38, white (police traffic officer)	Henry S. Caulfield
John Messino	White	27	M	July 25, 1930	Jackson	Murder-Robbery	James Horace Smith, 38, white (police traffic officer)	Henry S. Caulfield
Tony Mangiaracina	White	28	M	July 25, 1930	Jackson	Murder-Robbery	James Horace Smith, 38, white (police traffic officer)	Henry S. Caulfield
Joe Hershon	White	24	M	January 15, 1932	Jackson	Murder-Robbery	Charles H. Dingman Jr., 28, white (patrolman)	Henry S. Caulfield
Lew Worden	White	33	M	March 3, 1932	Jasper	Rape-Robbery	Female, 16, white (Note: Serial rapist, assaulted at least 3 women during a series of robberies alongside his brother Harry.)	Henry S. Caulfield
Emerson White	Black	29	M	August 12, 1932	St. Louis City	Murder-Robbery	Pinckney Hollis, 55, black	Henry S. Caulfield
James Keller	White	29	M	January 20, 1933	St. Louis	Murder-Robbery	Etta Wayman Sauer, 44, white	Guy Brasfield Park
Harry Worden	White	27	M	February 10, 1933	Jasper	Rape-Robbery	Female, 15, white (Note: Serial rapist, assaulted at least 3 women during a series of robberies alongside his brother Lew.)	Guy Brasfield Park
David Miller	White	48	M	February 10, 1933	St. Charles	Murder-Burglary	Paulina Duebbert, 47, white	Guy Brasfield Park
John Boyd	Black	32	M	November 2, 1933	St. Louis	Rape	Female, white (Note: Serial rapist, assaulted at least 18 women (14 white and 4 black) in the St. Louis suburbs.)	Guy Brasfield Park
March Jefferson	Black	22	M	December 15, 1933	Jackson	Murder-Robbery	Morris Kross, 59, white	Guy Brasfield Park
Sam Gordon	Black	21	M	December 15, 1933	Jackson	Murder-Robbery	Morris Kross, 59, white	Guy Brasfield Park
Eugene Copeland	Black	32	M	June 29, 1934	St. Louis City	Murder-Robbery	Jacob P. Davis, 45, white	Guy Brasfield Park
Paul Kauffman	White	34	M	June 29, 1934	Jackson	Murder-Rape	Avis Woolery, 17, white	Guy Brasfield Park
William Roland	Black	42	M	April 12, 1935	Gasconade	Murder	Edwin C. Shane and John W. Whitted, 28 and 42, white (Note: Previously court-martialed in New Mexico in 1922 for the murder of two Mexicans and sentenced to life imprisonment, but paroled after 10 years after his sentence was commuted to 20 years.)	Guy Brasfield Park
Frank McDaniel	Black	28	M	April 12, 1935	Greene	Murder	Savilla Scott, 25, black	Guy Brasfield Park
C. D. Ward	Black	25	M	August 16, 1935	Dunklin	Rape	Two sisters, 25 and 27, white	Guy Brasfield Park
Edward Gayman	White	27	M	August 30, 1935	New Madrid	Murder-Robbery	Arthur Cashion, 28, white	Guy Brasfield Park
Roy Hamilton	White	27	M	August 30, 1935	New Madrid	Murder-Robbery	Arthur Cashion, 28, white	Guy Brasfield Park
George McKeever	White	36	M	December 18, 1936	Callaway	Murder	Ben O. Booth, 35, white (highway patrolman) (Note: Also murdered Roger I. Wilson (42, white).)	Guy Brasfield Park
Hurt Hardy Jr.	White	31	M	February 26, 1937	Ste. Genevieve	Murder	Ethel Fenestock, 19, white (love interest)	Lloyd C. Stark
Fred Adams	White	21	M	April 2, 1937	Dunklin	Murder-Robbery	Clarence Andrew Green, 25, white (night marshal)	Lloyd C. Stark
Roscoe Jackson	White	36	M	May 21, 1937	Stone	Murder-Robbery	Pearl L. Bozarth, 55, white (Note: Also previously murdered Albert Ocy Garrison (41, white) in Pauls Valley, Oklahoma.)	Lloyd C. Stark
Dudley Barr	Black	39	M	May 21, 1937	Jackson	Murder-Robbery	Walter Milton, 40, black	Lloyd C. Stark

== Gas asphyxiation ==
On September 4, 1937, Missouri's official method of execution was changed from local hangings to centralized gas asphyxiation at the state penitentiary. The state's gas chamber leaked at least twice during early test runs, including one on December 7th where a 75-pound pig was used as a test subject.

Name	Race	Age	Sex	Date of execution	County or City	Crime	Victim(s)	Governor
John Brown	Black	34	M	March 4, 1938	Jackson	Murder	William Cavanaugh, 31, white (police officer)	Lloyd C. Stark
William Wright	Black	33	M	March 4, 1938	Jackson	Murder-Robbery	John Thomas McCampbell, 52, black	Lloyd C. Stark
Raymond Boyer	White	33	M	March 5, 1938	Jackson	Murder-Robbery	Walter Dale Sandford, 29, white	Lloyd C. Stark
Raymond Batson	Black	33	M	March 30, 1938	St. Louis	Murder	Philip Rabenau and William E. Poole, 43 and 47, white	Lloyd C. Stark
Johnny Jones	Black	35	M	July 15, 1938	New Madrid	Rape	Female, 45, white	Lloyd C. Stark
Adam Ricchetti	White	28	M	October 7, 1938	Jackson	Murder	Frank Hermanson, 46, white (Kansas City police officer) (Note: Murdered four other people during the crime: FBI agent Raymond Caffrey (31, white), McAlester police chief Otto H. Reed (49, white), Kansas City police officer William J. Grooms (29, white), and serial bank robber Frank Nash (46, white).)	Lloyd C. Stark
Granville Allen	Black	28	M	October 28, 1938	Jackson	Murder-Robbery	Howard Preston, 47, white	Lloyd C. Stark
Byron E. King	White	28	M	November 4, 1938	St. Louis City	Murder-Robbery	George Speer, 68, white	Lloyd C. Stark
John Williamson	White	63	M	February 15, 1939	Ste. Genevieve	Murder	George Williams, 64, white (Note: Previously convicted of murdering another farmer (Andrew J. Smothers, 55, white) in Marion County, Illinois and subsequently served 22 months of a life sentence.)	Lloyd C. Stark
Robert Kenyon	White	24	M	April 28, 1939	Oregon (Note: Change of venue from Howell County.)	Murder-Kidnap	Dr. James Clinton B. Davis, 66, white	Lloyd C. Stark
Robert West	White	25	M	September 20, 1940	St. Louis	Murder	Vivian Davidson, 20, white (ex-girlfriend)	Lloyd C. Stark
Chester Jackson	Black	31	M	September 20, 1940	Jasper	Murder	Daisy Esmond, 32, black (girlfriend)	Lloyd C. Stark
Wilburn Johnson	Black	39	M	January 3, 1941	Butler	Murder	Willis and Sarah Mitchell, 15 and 13, black	Lloyd C. Stark
Ernest Tyler	Black	37	M	April 24, 1942	Jackson	Murder-Burglary	Erwin Schwarenholz, 40, white	Forrest C. Donnell
Allen Lambus	Black	73	M	June 16, 1944	Mississippi	Murder-Rape	Juanita Harris, 14, black (Note: Previously convicted of manslaughter and attempted rape in Mississippi and subsequently served time at Parchman Prison.)	Forrest C. Donnell
James Thomas	Black	20	M	October 19, 1944	St. Louis	Rape	Female, 23, white	Forrest C. Donnell
Leo Lyles	Black	22	M	May 25, 1945	St. Louis	Murder	Martin Twillman, 23, white	Phil M. Donnelly
William Edward Talbert	Black	24	M	November 16, 1945	St. Louis	Murder	Martin Twillman, 23, white	Phil M. Donnelly
Fred Ellis	Black	23	M	August 16, 1946	Franklin	Murder-Burglary	Mary Santo, 56, white	Phil M. Donnelly
Jesse Sanford	Black	37	M	August 16, 1946	Franklin	Murder-Burglary	Mary Santo, 56, white	Phil M. Donnelly
Van Lee Ramsey	Black	36	M	January 9, 1947	St. Louis City	Murder-Robbery	Lena Afton Davidson, 19, white	Phil M. Donnelly
Marshall Perkins	Black	59	M	January 24, 1947	Jackson	Rape	Gladys Jeffries, 13, white	Phil M. Donnelly
Floyd Cochran	Black	37	M	September 26, 1947	Boone	Murder-Rape	Mary Lou Jenkins, 20, white (Note: Also later murdered his wife Mary Ann Cochran (35, black) out of fear she would report him to authorities.)	Phil M. Donnelly
Ernest Afton Scott	White	49	M	November 4, 1949	Wright	Murder	Verla Marie Raney Scott, 40, white (ex-wife) (Note: Also murdered circuit court judge Charles Hairston Jackson (54, white) on the same day for his involvement in their divorce proceedings.)	Forrest Smith
George Bell	Black	35	M	December 2, 1949	Jackson	Murder	Charles William Neaves, 30, black (police officer) (Note: Five others were killed during the same crime: police officers Charles H. Perrine (45, white), Sandy Washington (27, black), William S. Wells (36, white) as well as William Bell (33, black) and Edwin Warren (27, black). William Bell and Edwin Burton Warren were both shot and killed by the police. Previously murdered a black soldier in Oran, Algeria in 1943 and served part of a 10-year sentence.)	Forrest Smith
Charles Tiedt	White	56	M	May 19, 1950	Buchanan	Murder	Three people, white (Note: Delbert and Edna Matchett (44 and 37, white) and Frederick Matchett (29, white).)	Forrest Smith
Claude McGee	White	39	M	January 5, 1951	Cole	Murder	John B. Manor, 47, white (inmate) (Note: Crime committed in the state penitentiary. McGee and Manor, along with two others, had committed a house burglary in Scott County which turned fatal when the resident (William Thomas Carlton, 50, white) returned home; after a change of venue to Mississippi County, McGee was sentenced to death for firing the fatal gunshot but had his sentence commuted to life imprisonment.)	Forrest Smith
Willie Porter	Black	29	M	January 28, 1952	Cole	Rape	Belle Agee, 70, white	Forrest Smith
Ulas Quilling	Black	53	M	May 29, 1953	Jackson	Murder	Three people, black (Note: Lauvinia Julia Wright Webb (42, black), Irene Bragg (36, black), and Carl Dodd (55, black).)	Phil M. Donnelly
Kenneth Boyd	Black	23	M	July 10, 1953	St. Louis City	Murder-Robbery	Samuel Barrenfeld, 54, white	Phil M. Donnelly
Bonnie B. Heady	White	41	F	December 18, 1953	N/A (Federal)	Kidnapping (Note: Also murdered the victim.)	Robert Cosgrove Greenlease Jr., 6, white	Phil M. Donnelly
Carl Austin Hall	White	34	M	December 18, 1953	N/A (Federal)	Kidnapping	Robert Cosgrove Greenlease Jr., 6, white	Phil M. Donnelly
Dock Booker	Black	46	M	April 1, 1955	St. Louis City	Murder	Earl Harrison, 43, black	Phil M. Donnelly
Arthur Ross Brown	White	31	M	February 24, 1956	N/A (Federal)	Kidnapping (Note: Also raped and murdered the victim.)	Wilma Frances Allen, 34, white	Phil M. Donnelly
Thomas Moore	Black	42	M	September 13, 1957	Jackson	Murder	Opal Irene Moore, 36, black (wife)	James T. Blair Jr.
Sammy Aire Tucker	White	26	M	July 26, 1963	Cape Girardeau	Murder-Robbery	Herbert L. Goss, 67, white (auxiliary police officer) (Note: Also murdered patrolman Donald Crittendon (27, white).)	John M. Dalton
Charles Harvey Odom	White	32	M	March 6, 1964	Jasper	Rape-Kidnap	Lisa Margaret Schuh, 13, white	John M. Dalton
Ronald Lee Wolfe	White	33	M	May 8, 1964	Pike (Note: Change of venue from Lawrence County.)	Rape (Note: Last execution in the United States for non-fatal rape and for a crime where the victim survived.)	Female, 8, white (Note: Serial rapist, also raped an 8-year-old girl in New York.)	John M. Dalton
Lloyd Leo Anderson	Black	22	M	February 26, 1965	St. Louis City	Murder-Robbery	Thomas E. Grupe, 15, white (Note: Previously murdered deli owner Emerson Wright (47, white) and storekeeper William W. Schulze (59, white) during similar crimes.)	Warren E. Hearnes

== See also ==
- Capital punishment in Missouri
- Crime in Missouri
