= Bishop John Robinson =

Bishop John Robinson may refer to:

- John Robinson (bishop of Woolwich) (1919–1983), British Bishop of Woolwich; Dean of Trinity College
- John Edward Robinson (bishop), Missionary Bishop of the Methodist Episcopal Church
- John Wesley Robinson, Missionary Bishop and Bishop of the Methodist Episcopal Church
- John Robinson (bishop of London), English diplomat; later Bishop of Bristol from 1710 and Lord Privy Seal from 1711 to 1713

== See also ==
- John Robinson (disambiguation)
