= George Mercer =

American murderer executed in Missouri in 1989

- Mugshot of Mercer in 1979
- Born: George C. Mercer; August 31, 1944; Missouri, U.S.
- Died: January 6, 1989 (aged 44); Missouri State Penitentiary, Jefferson City, Missouri, U.S.
- Cause of death: Execution by lethal injection
- Other name: George "Tiny" Mercer
- Conviction: Capital murder
- Penalty: Death

George C. "Tiny" Mercer (August 31, 1944 – January 6, 1989) was an American man who was convicted for the rape and murder of 22-year-old Karen Keeton in Belton, Missouri, on August 31, 1978. At the time of the murder, Mercer had a charge pending against him of raping a 17-year-old girl. He was executed at the age of 44 by the state of Missouri by lethal injection. He became the first person to be executed in Missouri since 1965. His execution was carried out in the former gas chamber which was converted to use lethal injection.

== Murder of Karen Keeton ==
Late on August 30, 1978, George Mercer went drinking with friends from one of his motorcycle gangs at a lounge in Grandview, Missouri. While there, he noticed 22-year-old Karen Ann Keeton, who was working at the lounge as a waitress, and commented to a friend that he would like to sleep with her. Prior to the day of the murder, Mercer and Keeton had never met. One of Mercer's friends, Steven Gardner, approached Keeton and invited her out to breakfast with him, after which the two would visit Mercer's house in Belton, Missouri. His plan was to hand Keeton over to Mercer as a "birthday present," since the next day was Mercer's 34th birthday.

Mercer then left the lounge with David Gee, a fellow gang member, and went back to his Belton home, arriving shortly after midnight on August 31. Another of Mercer's friends, John Allen Campbell, was already at the house babysitting Mercer's 10-year-old daughter, who was at the house and witnessed parts of the ensuing assault and murder. Shortly after Mercer and Gee's arrival, Gardner and Keeton arrived at the house as well. Mercer then threatened Keeton with a sawed-off double-barreled shotgun and ordered her to go upstairs to his bedroom. When she hesitated and asked Gardner for help, Gardner responded, "Happy birthday, Tiny," directed towards Mercer. Mercer raped Keeton in his bedroom; later, Gardner sexually assaulted her as well, followed by David Gee. Gardner also stole money from Keeton's purse.

After the multiple sexual assaults were over, Campbell would later testify that he went upstairs to comfort the victim, who was crying; afterwards, he fell asleep. Mercer headed upstairs afterwards, and on his way, he passed Gardner; he asked Gardner what they should do with the victim, and Gardner replied that they should kill Keeton. Mercer agreed. When Gardner asked Mercer if he would need help, Mercer refused and claimed that he knew of a good location to hide the body where it would never be found. Gardner and Gee left the house while Mercer advanced upstairs, where he manually strangled Keeton to death. At one point, Mercer called for Campbell and asked Campbell to take Keeton's pulse, and when Campbell detected a faint pulse, Mercer began striking Keeton's head and body while he continued to strangle her. Campbell again checked for a pulse and found none, at which point Mercer removed Keeton's body from his bed. He ordered Campbell to clean the crime scene and placed his sheets and blanket in his washing machine. Afterwards, Mercer and Campbell loaded Keeton's body into Mercer's pickup truck.

Campbell drove the truck while Mercer directed him on where to go until they reached a desolate field, where Mercer dumped the body over a fence. When Mercer returned to the truck, he told Campbell that he wished he had murdered a 17-year-old girl who he had also raped earlier, stating that if he had, "I wouldn't have been on any rape charges and things I'm on right now." At the time of Keeton's murder, Mercer had a rape charge pending against him that the 17-year-old victim filed against him. When the two returned to Mercer's house, Campbell hid Mercer's shotgun, while Mercer burned Keeton's purse.

Sometime between then and late September 1978, John Campbell acquired an attorney, who helped him to locate Keeton's body. Three to four weeks after the murder, Campbell and his attorney found Keeton's badly decomposed body in the field where Mercer had left it. Campbell's attorney reported the body to authorities.

== Arrest and trial ==
Over the next few weeks, Campbell would later testify that Kansas City police approached him three separate times to question him about Keeton's disappearance and what he might have known about it. Campbell told them he knew nothing about it; he would later testify at a preliminary hearing that he was waiting for family to relocate from the area before he approached an attorney to come clean with what he knew about the murder. In late September, Campbell acquired an attorney, Sidney Willems, who helped him to find Keeton's badly decomposed body. The body was found in Johnson County, Missouri, on September 29 in the field where Mercer had left it. Campbell and his attorney reported the body to authorities; Campbell was then taken into protective custody. After being placed in protective custody, Campbell fully confessed to his role in the murder and agreed to testify for the state in exchange for immunity, while Mercer and Gardner were taken into custody and held without bond at the Cass County Jail.

After being taken into custody, Mercer was charged with the rape of the 17-year-old girl, which occurred in July 1978. While Mercer awaited trial, he was brought in for a hearing regarding the gang rape of another woman which occurred on August 17, 1978, weeks before Keeton's murder. The victim testified at a hearing in mid-October 1978 that Mercer forcibly removed her from her home and took her to a field near Belton, Missouri, where Mercer and several of his friends raped her.

In 1979, Mercer and Gardner went on trial for first degree murder. Campbell claimed during both a preliminary hearing and the trial itself that he thought Gardner was joking about killing Keeton and that Mercer took the supposedly facetious order seriously. Campbell also claimed that he did not interfere with the rape or murder because he was afraid of Mercer. The jury was presented with the option to convict Mercer and/or Gardner of capital murder, second-degree murder, or manslaughter. Both Mercer and Gardner were convicted of capital murder. In Gardner's case, the jury imposed a sentence of life imprisonment without parole until Gardner had served a minimum of 50 years of his sentence. Mercer was sentenced to death.

On appeal, Gardner's conviction was reduced to second degree murder. He was released on parole in 2023.

== Death row and appeals ==
Mercer was admitted to death row on November 9, 1979. In an interview that Mercer gave in 1981, he claimed that he was innocent of the murder; he also declared that he had undergone a religious conversion while on death row. Prison officials claimed that the prison staff liked Mercer, who often helped newer condemned men adjust to life on death row since, at the time of his execution, Mercer was the longest-serving death row inmate in Missouri.

Mercer's execution was once scheduled for October 20, 1988. On October 19, Mercer received a stay of execution from a three-judge panel of the 8th U.S. Circuit Court of Appeals. On Friday, December 30, 1988, the same three judges lifted the stay of execution, allowing the Missouri Supreme Court to set a new execution date. Around January 4, the Missouri Supreme Court ordered the state of Missouri to execute Mercer two days later, at midnight on January 6. Even after having this execution date scheduled, Mercer continued to file legal motions in an attempt to delay his execution; meanwhile, a spokeswoman for then-Missouri Attorney General William L. Webster said, "We'll oppose any attempts to get a stay of execution." Then-governor of Missouri John Ashcroft also indicated that if he received a formal request to delay Mercer's execution, he would reject it.

Mercer was the first inmate on Missouri's death row to exhaust his appeals, but he was not the first to ever have a concrete execution date set in the post-Gregg v. Georgia era of executions. Gerald Smith, another Missouri death row inmate who waived his appeals, had three execution dates set prior to Mercer's being set in October. He received an indefinite postponement from a December 20, 1988, execution date when he indicated that he wanted to resume his appeals. On January 18, 1990, Smith would become the second person executed in Missouri after the resumption of executions in the United States.

== Execution ==
Mercer was executed by lethal injection just after midnight on January 6, 1989, in the Missouri State Penitentiary in Jefferson City. His wife Christie was an official witness to the execution; Mercer was allowed to invite witnesses to his execution, so he selected Christie and a friend from a motorcycle gang. The majority of the witnesses were media representatives and prison officials. Prison officials requested 19 people to watch the execution, but only 12 of them showed up. Warden Bill M. Armontrout claimed that Mercer thanked him before he died, shook his hand, and said, "Look out for my shipmates down here." The lethal injection began at 12:03 a.m., and witnesses claimed that Mercer coughed three or four times while straining against the straps on the gurney before he lost consciousness at 12:05 a.m.; an attending physician pronounced Mercer dead at 12:09 a.m.

The execution took place in Missouri's former gas chamber, which had been converted to accommodate a lethal injection gurney. Prior to Mercer's execution, the most recent execution in Missouri had taken place on February 26, 1965, when Lloyd Leo Anderson died by gas inhalation for the murder of a delivery boy during the robbery of a St. Louis drugstore.

Mercer was the final inmate to be executed at the Missouri State Penitentiary. The Potosi Correctional Center (PCC) opened later in 1989. In April 1989, the state transferred its 70 death row inmates from the Missouri State Penitentiary to the new prison in Potosi. The Missouri State Penitentiary closed in 2004. Death row inmates are currently held at the facility in Potosi; executions took place there as well until 2005, when the death chamber was moved to the Eastern Reception, Diagnostic and Correctional Center in Bonne Terre, Missouri.

== See also ==
- Capital punishment in Missouri
- Capital punishment in the United States
- List of people executed in Missouri
- List of people executed in the United States in 1989
