= Lloyd Leo Anderson =

American convicted murderer and suspected serial killer (1942–1965)

Lloyd Anderson
- 1962 booking photo of Anderson
- Born: Lloyd Leo Anderson; September 17, 1942; St. Louis, Missouri, U.S.
- Died: February 26, 1965 (aged 22); Missouri State Penitentiary, Missouri, U.S.
- Status: Executed by gas chamber
- Motive: Robbery
- Conviction: First-degree murder
- Penalty: Death

Details
- Victims: 1 convicted, 2 confessed
- Date: March – May 1961
- Location: Missouri
- Imprisoned at: Missouri State Penitentiary

Lloyd Leo Anderson (September 17, 1942 – February 26, 1965) was an American convicted murderer and suspected serial killer. Between March and May 1961, Anderson committed three murders, robbing each victim before killing them. Following the third murder, Anderson and one of his two accomplices, Clewiston Jones, became involved in a gunfight with police. The confrontation resulted in Anderson being captured, while Jones was killed during the standoff. The other accomplice, Anderson's uncle Charles Moore, was caught a day after his nephew's arrest.

Anderson was subsequently tried for the murder of 15-year-old Thomas Grupe, a drugstore delivery boy who was killed during a robbery in St. Louis, Missouri. He was convicted, sentenced to death, and executed in the gas chamber on February 26, 1965. Anderson was reportedly the last person executed by gas chamber in Missouri. Moore, his surviving co-defendant, pleaded guilty to Grupe's murder and was sentenced to life in prison.

In addition to Grupe, Anderson was implicated in the murders of Emerson Wright and William W. Schulze, who were also killed during the series of robberies committed by Anderson and/or his accomplices.

== Murders ==
=== William W. Schulze ===
On March 25, 1961, 18-year-old Lloyd Leo Anderson killed his first victim, 59-year-old grocery store owner William W. Schulze, during an armed holdup in St. Louis, Missouri. During the robbery, Schulze and his daughter were held at gunpoint by Anderson, and when Schulze did not obey the demand to raise his hands, he was fatally shot by Anderson in front of his daughter, before he escaped the premises. The murder was unsolved for two months before Anderson was linked to the crime, to which he confessed.

=== Thomas Grupe ===
On May 18, 1961, Anderson, accompanied by his accomplices — his 36-year-old uncle, Charles Miller Moore, and 19-year-old Clewiston Jones — entered a local drugstore in St. Louis, to commit robbery. This began with Moore entering the store and coming face to face with the store owner, 35-year-old Paul Speckart, and Moore asked for sulphathiazole. When Speckart was informing him that he needed a doctor's prescription to get the drug, both Anderson and Jones entered the store while armed with sawed-off shotguns and revolvers, and held Speckart at gunpoint. Speckart was forced to hand over the money from his cash register, which amounted to more than $300 in total, and he was also beaten several times with the shotgun by the gunmen.

Midway through the robbery attempt, 15-year-old Thomas Grupe, the store's delivery boy, returned from a delivery run, and he was also forcibly held at gunpoint by the robbers, who took him and Speckart to the store's basement, where they were beaten with the stocks of the shotguns. After the beating, both Jones and Anderson fired two shots at both Speckart and Grupe. Speckart was shot on the shoulder, while Grupe was fatally shot in the chest and died, and an autopsy report showed that there was severe hemorrhage into the chest cavities. When Anderson was questioned by the police about the murder of Grupe, he admitted that he shot Grupe because he was "screaming".

=== Emerson Wright ===
On May 24, 1961, six days after the murder of Grupe, Anderson was involved in the murder of Emerson Wright, the 47-year-old proprietor of a delicatessen-liquor store in St. Louis. According to reports, Anderson and Jones went to Wright's store to rob him, and when Wright got into a scuffle with one of the men, he was shot and killed by the gunmen before they left. Anderson confessed to the crime when he was arrested several days after the killing, and he named Jones as the shooter who killed Wright.

== Capture and charges ==
On the night of May 29, 1961, five days after killing Wright, both Clewiston Jones and Lloyd Anderson once again committed robbery at a liquor store, and they herded the employees and patrons into the cooler. About a block away, two police officers, Raymond Lauer and Henry Lachenicht, were alerted of the holdup and they responded to the scene while the holdup was ongoing. Subsequently, a gunfight broke out between the officers and the gunmen, and during the standoff, Jones was killed by the officers, and it ended after Anderson threw away his pistol and gave himself up to the police.

Jones's wife, who was found in a car nearby the holdup scene, was taken to the police headquarters to be questioned after her husband's death, but she stated she was unaware of her husband's activities outside.

After his arrest, Anderson confessed to his involvement in the murders of Thomas Grupe, William Schulze and Emerson Wright, as well as another 30 armed robberies, which he committed alongside Jones. Additionally, Anderson implicated his uncle, Charles Moore, as the third culprit in the murder of Grupe. Moore was arrested on May 30, 1961, a day after his nephew's capture, and he admitted to his involvement in the drugstore robbery but denied shooting any of the two victims.

On June 2, 1961, Anderson was charged with two counts of first-degree murder for both the killings of Grupe and Schulze. Moore was charged with first-degree murder for the killing of Grupe.

== Trial, death row and appeal ==
On September 23, 1961, Lloyd Anderson stood trial before a St. Louis County jury for only the murder of the second victim, Thomas Grupe. During the trial, the prosecution sought the death penalty for Anderson, and also presented his confession in court, which they sought to admit as evidence against him. The surviving robbery victim, Paul Speckart, came to court and identified Anderson as one of the three gunmen involved in the killing of Grupe.

On September 27, 1961, the prosecution concluded their case and the defence made no submissions, but they stated that the defendant was the product of the crime-ridden slums in St. Louis. the case was turned over to the jury for deliberation.

On September 28, 1961, the jury found Anderson guilty of first-degree murder, and after his conviction, the jury recommended the death penalty for Anderson.

A day after Anderson's conviction, his surviving accomplice, Charles Moore, pleaded guilty to robbery and first-degree murder charges, and he was therefore sentenced to life imprisonment by Circuit Judge Robert Aronson, as requested by the prosecution on account of the lesser degree of culpability compared to Anderson's role in the crime. Jones filed an appeal against his conviction, but it was rejected by the Missouri Supreme Court on January 11, 1971.

On February 2, 1962, Anderson was formally sentenced to death in the gas chamber by Circuit Judge Ivan Lee Holt, who issued an execution date of March 9, 1962, for the defendant, although the date was delayed due to an appeal.

In June 1962, Anderson was one of six death row prisoners who attempted to escape from the Missouri State Penitentiary, where he was incarcerated on death row. However, all six convicts were caught before they could made it out of the prison compound.

On December 9, 1963, the Missouri Supreme Court dismissed Anderson's appeal against his death sentence.

== Execution ==
On December 15, 1964, the Missouri Supreme Court signed a death warrant for Lloyd Anderson, and set an execution date of January 22, 1965. However, days before Anderson's execution date, Raymond Howard, a state politician, proposed a bill to abolish capital punishment and submitted it to the legislature. He additionally requested the governor to postpone Anderson's execution while the bill was pending its review and approval.

A day later, on January 21, 1965, the eve of Anderson's scheduled execution, Missouri Governor Warren E. Hearnes granted Anderson a five-week reprieve in light of the pending death penalty abolition bill, and allowed the legislature to put up a vote on the bill before Anderson's execution could proceed. Governor Hearnes, who was a supporter of capital punishment, stated he would accept the decision of the legislature if they voted to abolish the death penalty. Should the bill be voted and approved by the legislature, Anderson would not be executed and his sentence would be commuted to life imprisonment. A new execution date of February 26, 1965, was reset for Anderson while the outcome of the bill was yet to be determined.

On February 24, 1965, the Missouri House of Representatives voted 112–44 to deny the bill, which allowed the state of Missouri to retain capital punishment, and also paved way to the possibility of executing Anderson for his crime. Warden W. P. Steinhauser revealed to the press that the prison made preparations to conduct the execution and he received no word about any potential stay of Anderson's execution. Although Governor Hearnes had the prerogative to grant clemency and commute Anderson's death sentence to life in prison, he expressed that he had no intention to intervene in the execution of Anderson.

On February 26, 1965, 22-year-old Lloyd Leo Anderson was put to death in the gas chamber at the Missouri State Penitentiary. According to reports, Anderson was taken to the execution chamber at 12:02am, and when the cyanide powder was dropped at 12:09am, Anderson reportedly cursed out at Governor Hearnes and the witnesses, and he was later pronounced dead at 12:15am.

Anderson was the last person executed in Missouri before the nationwide moratorium on capital punishment took effect in 1972. Although Missouri reinstated the death penalty in 1977, the state did not resume executions until 1989, when George Mercer was executed. Anderson was also the last person executed in Missouri's gas chamber before the state transitioned to lethal injection. Additionally, he was the second-to-last person executed at the Missouri State Penitentiary before the state's death row and execution chamber moved to the Potosi Correctional Center, and the prison was permanently closed since 2004.

== See also ==
- Capital punishment in Missouri
- List of people executed in Missouri (pre-1972)
- List of people executed in the United States, 1965–1972
