= Harry Snodgrass (pianist) =

Mid-1920s pianist

Harry M. Snodgrass
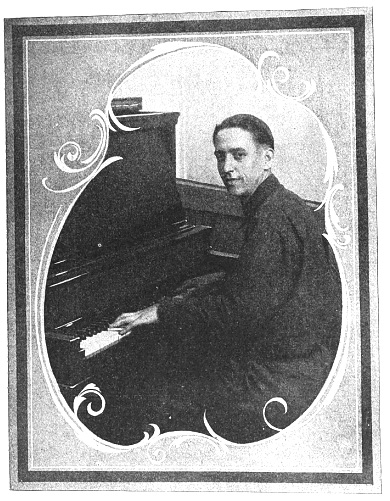
- Snodgrass in 1925
- Born: 1895
- Died: September 2, 1937 (aged 41–42)
- Occupation: Entertainer
- Known for: Piano performances
- Notable work: Broadcasts over radio station WOS, and recordings for Brunswick Records
- Spouse: Louise (divorced)
- Children: 1

Harry M. Snodgrass (1895-September 2, 1937) was an American performer, known as "The King of the Ivories", who was one of the first persons to become well known through radio broadcasts. Snodgrass became popular while incarcerated at the Missouri State Penitentiary, playing piano for broadcasts over radio station WOS in Jefferson City, Missouri. After being released from prison, Snodgrass became a vaudeville performer, and also recorded piano tunes for Brunswick Records.

== Biography ==
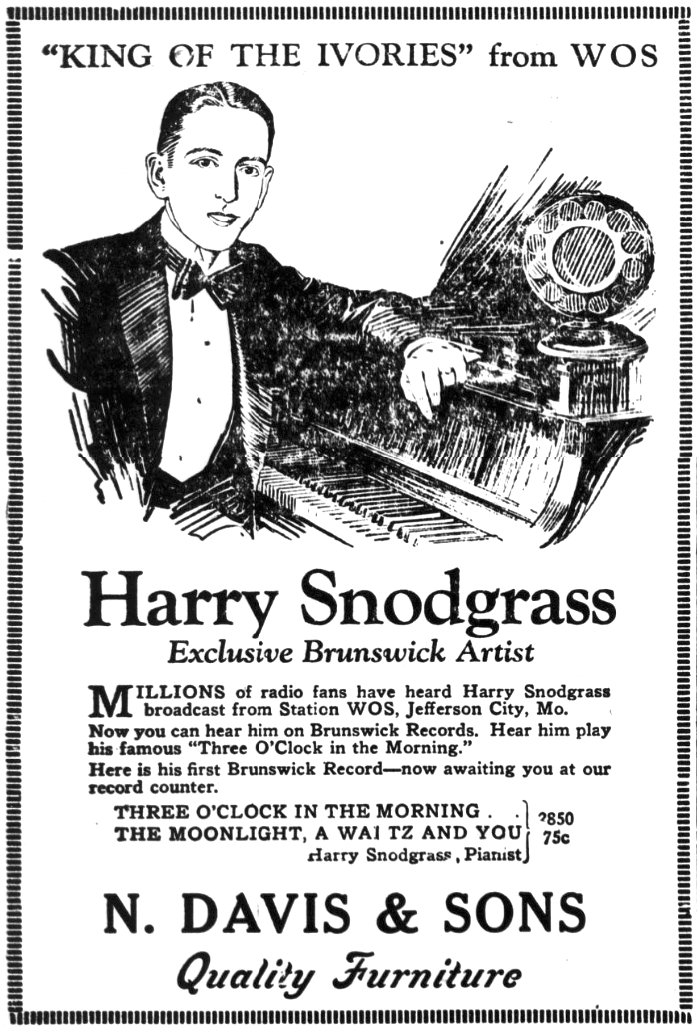
After being released from prison, Snodgrass toured as a performer, and made recordings for Brunswick records.

Snodgrass participated in a robbery of a confectionery store in mid-April 1923, along with Joseph Dritsch, who was fatally shot. Snodgrass pled guilty to assault with intent to rob, and was sentenced to three years in the Missouri State Penitentiary, entering prison on June 11, 1923. While imprisoned, Snodgrass headed the prison orchestra, and gained national prominence for piano broadcasts carried by radio station WOS in Jefferson City. He was one of the first persons to gain fame through radio performances.

Snodgrass was released from prison on January 16, 1925. Most of the coverage emphasized how he had reformed, and found legitimate success. While still in prison, an article reported that "Snodgrass admits that now he has a purpose in life. The piano is his life, and now he knows it will guide him to greater fame once he leaves the confines of the prison walls." However, shortly after he had been released from prison, a letter reprinted in Radio Broadcast magazine was very negative: "...what I do find fault with is the exulting of a criminal over radio, and the detrimental effect it must have on children. They know this man is a criminal, and they hear him called 'The King'. This is absolutely bad!...I seriously object to such propaganda as WOS has put forth in his behalf being broadcast into the homes of decent Americans. We need our moral foundations a sight more than we need Harry M. Snodgrass's music."

Former WOS announcer Sergeant J. McDon Witten became Snodgrass's manager. Snodgrass signed with Brunswick Records, and his first phonograph release was his signature tune, Three O'Clock in the Morning. He was slated to make a vaudeville tour, with "a two year booking on the Orpheum Circuit".

Snodgass died in Illinois on September 2, 1937. A review of his life noted that, while once having the same popularity as the contemporary performer Jack Benny, Snodgrass' fame had greatly diminished, and after initial success was no longer well known. Some reports claimed, that, reminiscent of his most famous tune, his death had occurred at 3:00 a.m.
