= Mound City News =

Newspaper in Missouri, U.S.

The Mound City News
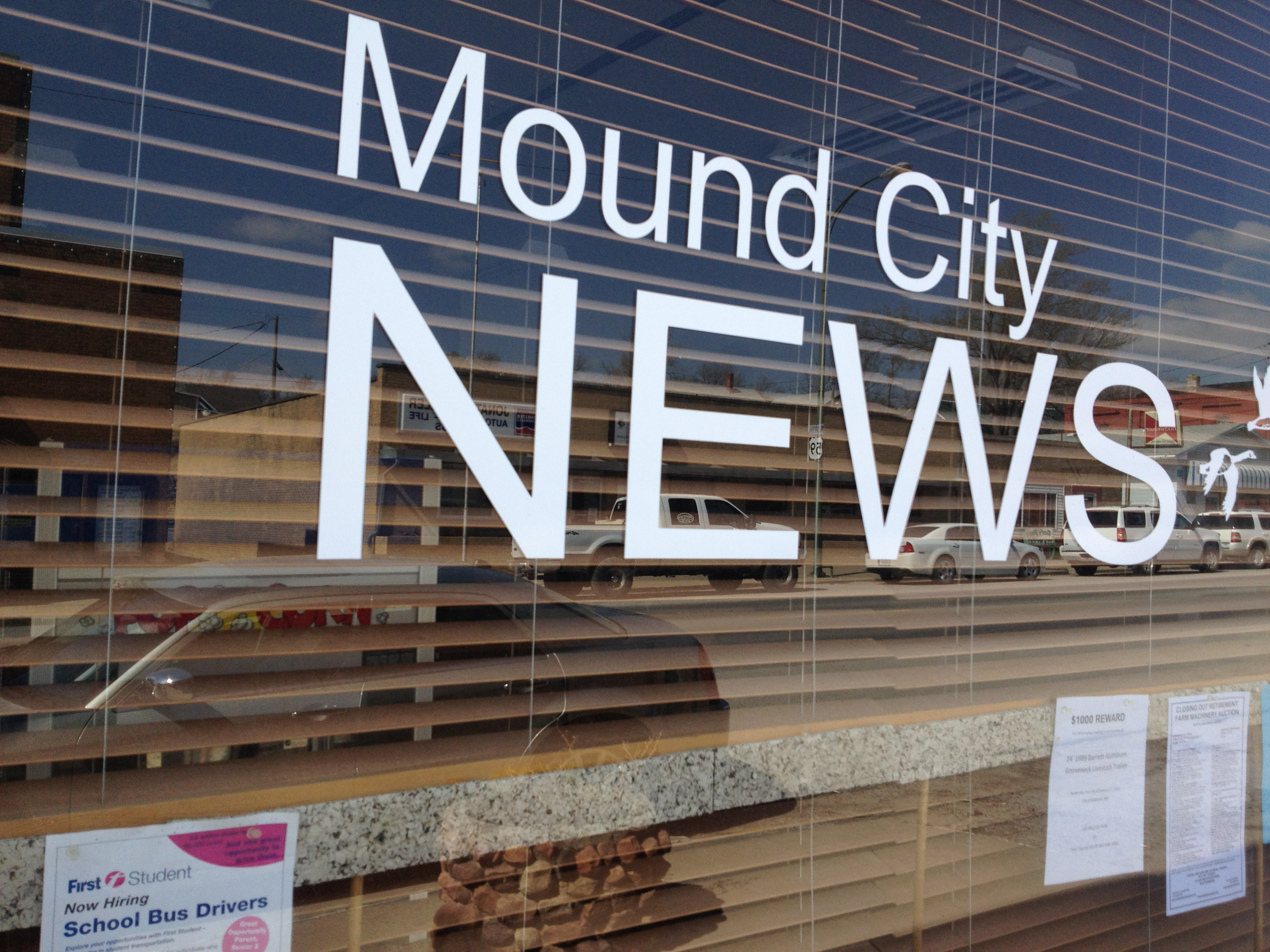
- Mound City News office
- Type: Weekly newspaper
- Owner: Adam Johnson
- Publisher: Adam Johnson
- Editor: Adam Johnson
- Founded: 1879
- Headquarters: P.O. Box 174; Mound City, MO 64470; USA
- Circulation: 2,400
- Website: moundcitynews.com

The Mound City News (sometimes called the Mound City News-Independent) is a local newspaper published in Mound City, Missouri, serving Holt County. It reports a circulation of 2,400 The paper has been publishing weekly since 1879 and currently releases its publication on Thursday each week. The publication claims roots back to 1879.
