= Mound City, Missouri =

- City
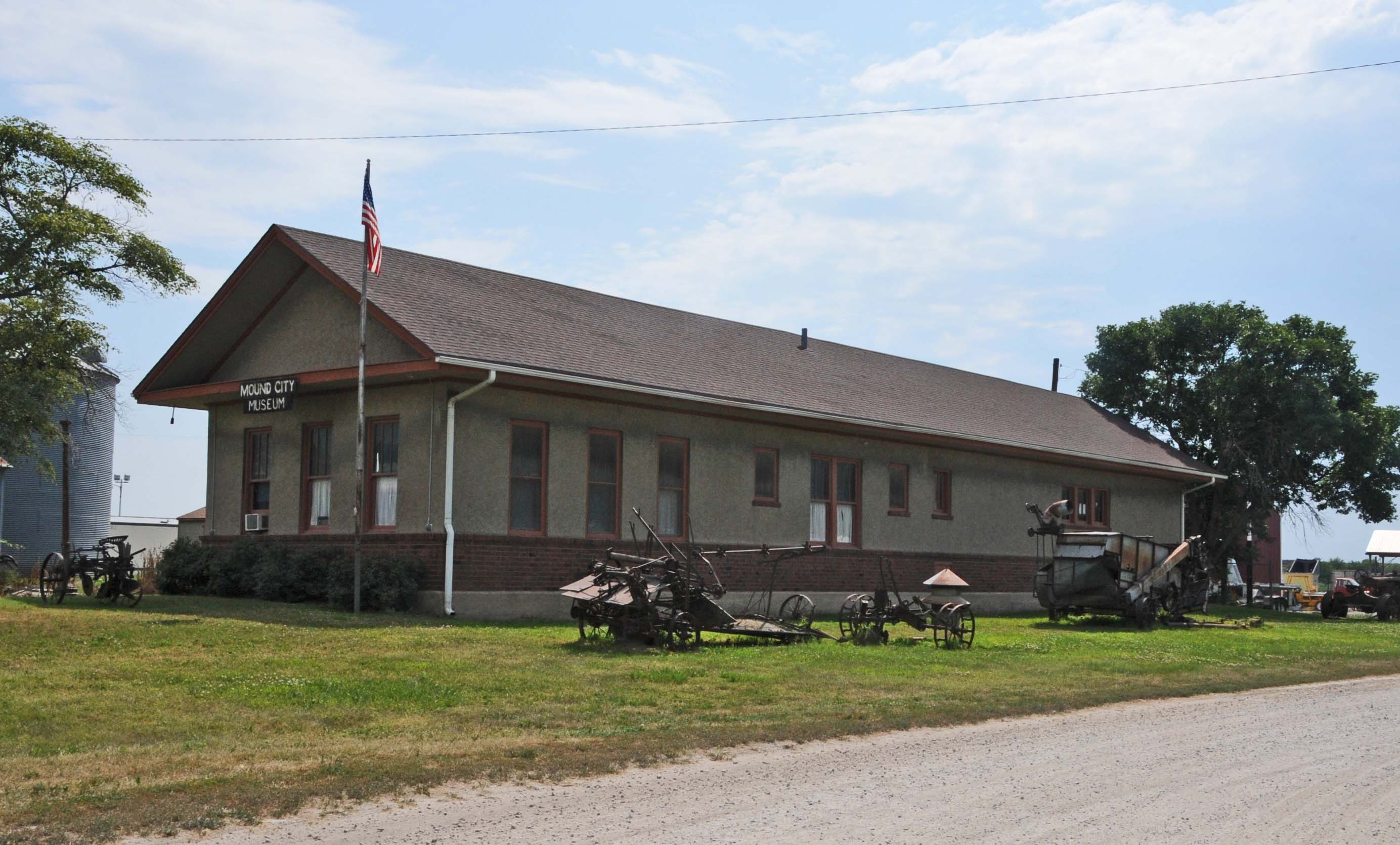
- Mound City Museum, housed in a former C.B.& Q. Railroad depot

- Location of Mound City, Missouri
- Coordinates: 40°08′11″N 95°14′01″W
- Country: United States
- State: Missouri
- County: Holt
- Township: Benton
- Incorporated: 1873

Area
  - Total: 1.25 sq mi (3.23 km^{2})
  - Land: 1.25 sq mi (3.23 km^{2})
  - Water: 0 sq mi (0.00 km^{2})
- Elevation: 961 ft (293 m)

Population (2020)
  - Total: 1,004
  - Density: 806.1/sq mi (311.22/km^{2})
- Time zone: UTC-6 (Central (CST))
  - Summer (DST): UTC-5 (CDT)
- ZIP code: 64470
- Area code: 660
- FIPS code: 29-50312
- GNIS feature ID: 2395113
- Website: http://www.moundcitymo.com/

Mound City is a city in Holt County, Missouri, United States, centered near the interchange of Interstate 29 and Missouri Route 118. The population was 1,004 at the 2020 census, down from the 1,159 people counted during the previous census.

== History ==
Mound City was originally called North Point, and under the latter name was platted on October 31, 1856. The present name is after mounds near the original town site. A post office called North Point was established in 1855, and the name was changed to Mound City in 1871. Mound City was incorporated in 1873. Jackson's Point, which was founded in 1840 at the confluence of the north and south forks of Davis Creek, was absorbed into Mound City in the 19th Century. The railroad finally reached Mound City in 1880.

== Geography ==
Mound City is located in the northwest corner of Missouri at the southern end of the Loess Hills. It is named for the hills in the area. According to the United States Census Bureau, the city has a total area of 1.29 square miles (3.34 km^{2}), all land. Mound City is also known for its location, almost equidistant between the major cities of Kansas City and Omaha.

Mound City is located in what was, in the early 19th century, considered to be unorganized Missouri Territory. In 1836, leaders of the Iowa, Sauk and Meskwaki peoples sold land that included what would become Mound City, as part of the 3,149 square miles (2,015,000 acres; 8,160 km^{2}) of the Platte Purchase.

=== Protected areas ===
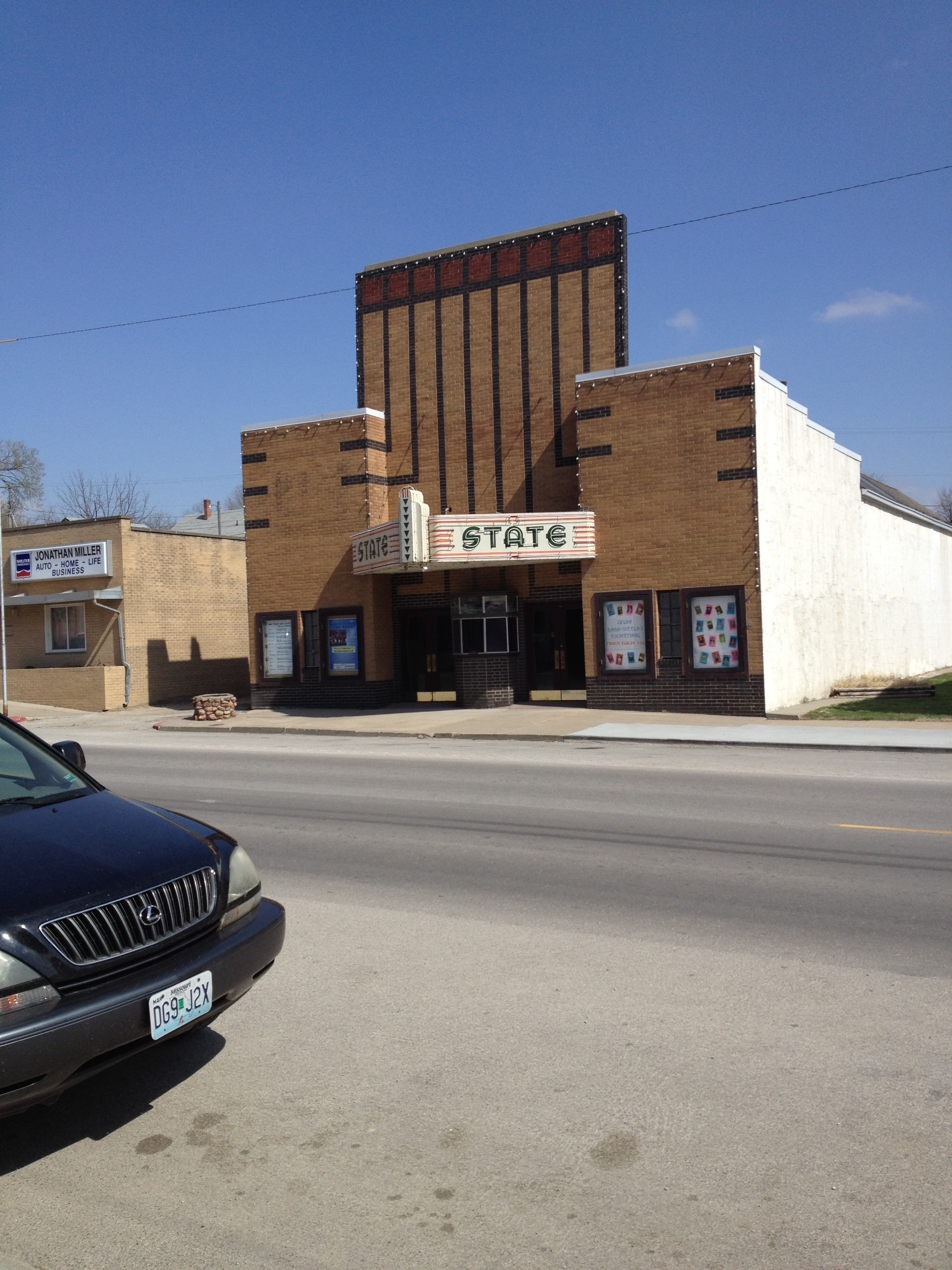
The State Theater, downtown

Mound City benefits economically from the Loess Bluffs National Wildlife Refuge, which is about 5 miles (8.0 km) from the city. Since spring snow geese migration numbers first topped one million in March 2008, Mound City and the surrounding area have benefited from the nearly 300,000 visitors they have attracted, including thousands of hunters who hunt in the stubble of corn fields that surround the refuge.

The refuge is estimated to add about $2.6 million to the economies of Holt and Buchanan counties. Hunting is prohibited on the 7,500-acre refuge, but not in the corn fields where the geese feed, which surround the refuge.

== Demographics ==
Historical population
Census	Pop.	Note	%±
1880	678		—
1890	1,193		76.0%
1900	1,681		40.9%
1910	1,575		−6.3%
1920	1,472		−6.5%
1930	1,525		3.6%
1940	1,606		5.3%
1950	1,412		−12.1%
1960	1,249		−11.5%
1970	1,202		−3.8%
1980	1,447		20.4%
1990	1,273		−12.0%
2000	1,193		−6.3%
2010	1,159		−2.8%
2020	1,004		−13.4%
U.S. Decennial Census

=== 2010 census ===
As of the census of 2010, there were 1,159 people, 514 households, and 317 families residing in the city. The population density was 898.4 inhabitants per square mile (346.9/km^{2}). There were 598 housing units at an average density of 463.6 per square mile (179.0/km^{2}). The racial makeup of the city was 96.1% White, 2.4% Native American, 0.7% Asian, 0.2% African American, and 0.6% from two or more races. Hispanic or Latino of any race were 1.1% of the population.

There were 514 households, of which 25.9% had children under the age of 18 living with them, 49.4% were married couples living together, 9.5% had a female householder with no husband present, 2.7% had a male householder with no wife present, and 38.3% were non-families. 34.8% of all households were made up of individuals, and 20% had someone living alone who was 65 years of age or older. The average household size was 2.16 and the average family size was 2.76.

The median age in the city was 46.3 years. 20% of residents were under the age of 18; 6% were between the ages of 18 and 24; 22.6% were from 25 to 44; 26% were from 45 to 64; and 25.5% were 65 years of age or older. The gender makeup of the city was 46.3% male and 53.7% female.

=== 2000 census ===
As of the census of 2000, there were 1,193 people, 547 households, and 321 families residing in the city. The population density was 921.4 inhabitants per square mile (355.8/km^{2}). There were 627 housing units at an average density of 484.2 per square mile (187.0/km^{2}). The racial makeup of the city was 98.91% White, 0.08% African American, 0.59% Native American, 0.08% Asian, and 0.34% from two or more races. Hispanic or Latino of any race were 0.50% of the population.

There were 547 households, out of which 23.6% had children under the age of 18 living with them, 47.5% were married couples living together, 8.4% had a female householder with no husband present, and 41.3% were non-families. 38.9% of all households were made up of individuals, and 23.9% had someone living alone who was 65 years of age or older. The average household size was 2.10 and the average family size was 2.80.

In the city the population was spread out, with 20.7% under the age of 18, 5.7% from 18 to 24, 23.0% from 25 to 44, 21.5% from 45 to 64, and 29.2% who were 65 years of age or older. The median age was 46 years. For every 100 females, there were 82.4 males. For every 100 females age 18 and over, there were 76.2 males.

The median income for a household in the city was $24,219, and the median income for a family was $33,472. Males had a median income of $25,446 versus $20,667 for females. The per capita income for the city was $15,985. About 10.1% of families and 12.5% of the population were below the poverty line, including 16.3% of those under age 18 and 12.0% of those age 65 or over.

== Media ==
The Mound City News is a local weekly newspaper which has been published in Mound City since April 1994.

== Education ==
Public education in Mound City is administered by Mound City R-II School District.

Mound City has a lending library, the Mound City Public Library.

== Notable people ==
- Jake Schoonover (NCAA Football Coach) University of Mississippi Special Teams Coordinator
- Frank McGrath (1903–1967), actor best known for his role on Wagon Train
- Charles Ray Hatcher (1929-1984), serial killer
