= WOS (AM) =

Radio station Jefferson City, Missouri (1922–1936)

- Jefferson City, Missouri; United States
- Broadcast area: Mid-Missouri
- Frequencies: 630 kHz (shared with KFRU daytime, and KFRU and WGBF nighttime)

Ownership
- Owner: State of Missouri, Missouri State Highway Patrol

History
- First air date: 1922
- Last air date: 1936
- Call sign meaning: "Watch Our State" (informal slogan)

Technical information
- Power: 500 watts

WOS was an American AM radio station in Jefferson City, Missouri. First licensed on February 23, 1922, it was the second broadcasting station authorized in Missouri, and the first in the state capital. WOS was deleted in March 1936.

== History ==
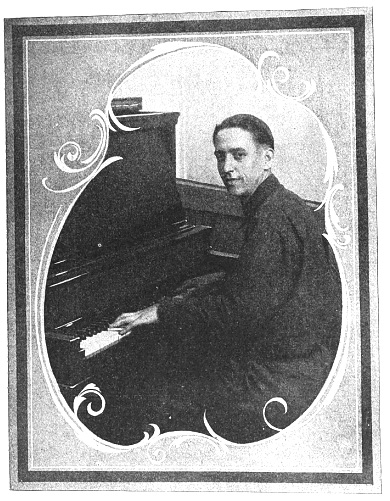
Harry Snodgrass became famous playing the piano from prison for WOS.

The US Department of Commerce regulated radio stations in the United States from 1912 until the 1927 formation of the Federal Radio Commission (FRC). Effective December 1, 1921, a regulation was adopted limiting broadcasting to stations operating under a Limited Commercial license that authorized operation on designated wavelengths of 360 meters (833 kHz) for "entertainment", and 485 meters (619 kHz) for "market and weather reports".

WOS was first licensed on February 23, 1922, to the Missouri State Marketing Bureau, as the state's second broadcasting station, six days after WOQ in Kansas City. It was also the first in the state capital of Jefferson City. WOS was initially authorized for operation on just the 485 meter "market and weather" wavelength, with the 360 meter "entertainment" wavelength authorized later in the year.

The station was located in the state capitol building. Because there was only a single "entertainment" wavelength, WOS was required to establish a time sharing agreement with any other local stations broadcasting on 360 meters. The call sign was randomly issued from a list of available call letters, and the station adopted the slogan "Watch Our State". Currently most stations west of the Mississippi River have call letters beginning with "K". However, prior to the January 1923 establishment of the river as the boundary, call letters beginning with "W" were generally assigned to stations east of an irregular line formed by the western state borders from North Dakota south to Texas, with calls beginning with "K" going only to stations in states west of that line.

A March 2 broadcast of "free entertainment" was planned to feature "speeches by prominent legislators", including Governor Sam A. Baker. A 1923 review listed R. J. Engler as the technical director, with Sergeant J. McDon Witten the primary announcer. This review also stated that "Broadcasting Station WOS sends out markets on the exact striking of the clock daily at 8, 9, 10, 11, 12, 1, 2 and 5 o'clock. No markets at 2 and 5 on Saturdays. Musical programs and addresses on Monday, Wednesday and Friday nights at eight o'clock on 441 meters or 680 kilocycles frequency."

In addition to agricultural broadcasts, the station added entertainment, featuring performers from the local Missouri State Penitentiary. Virgil Combs led the prison band, while pianist Harry M. Snodgrass headed its orchestra. WOS gained national prominence beginning in 1924, due to broadcasts featuring piano recitals by Snodgrass, who became known as "The King of the Ivories".

In the summer of 1923, the station was reassigned to 680 kHz, with later assignments to 760, 930, 640, and 710 kHz. An increase of the number of stations resulted in the need for timesharing of frequencies, which resulted in a reduction in the hours per day that WOS was allowed to operate. The state legislature became involved, and on March 17, 1927, passed a set of resolutions in an unsuccessful attempt to restore WOS's unlimited hours:

Mr. Speaker: I am instructed by the Senate to inform the House of Representatives that the Senate has taken up and respectfully concurs in the following resolution: Whereas, Radio Station WOS is state-owned and state-operated and supported by the taxpayers of the State of Missouri; and Whereas, WOS originally had all the time on wave length 440.9 meters from installation of the station until one year ago; and Whereas, Another Radio Station in Missouri enjoined WOS from using about one-half of the time; and Whereas, A bill has recently been passed by Congress and signed by the President to regulate wave lengths and time for broadcasting stations throughout the United States; therefore, be it Resolved, That the House of Representatives of the General Assembly of the State of Missouri, with the Senate concurring therein, ask and urge the Radio Commission at Washington, D. C., to restore to Radio Station WOS all of the time, both day and night, as originally assigned to WOS and, be it further Resolved, That in view of the fact that WOS is broadcasting the entire program of the United States Department of Agriculture, the Home Economics Department at Washington, D. C., the State Board of Agriculture, the University of Missouri and various other state institutions, that WOS requires all the time for the use and the benefit of the citizens of the State of Missouri. Upon adoption of this concurrent resolution by both branches of the Legislature, the Chief Clerk of the House is instructed to forward a copy of same to the Radio Commission at Washington, D. C.

Resolved, That the House of Representatives of the General Assembly of the State of Missouri, with the Senate concurring therein, ask and urge the Radio Commission at Washington, D. C., to restore to Radio Station WOS all of the time, both day and night, as originally assigned to WOS; and, be it further Resolved, That in view of the fact that WOS is broadcasting the entire program of the United States Department of Agriculture, the Home Economics Department at Washington, D. C., the State Board of Agriculture, the University of Missouri and various other state institutions, that WOS requires all the time for the use and the benefit of the citizens of the State of Missouri. Upon adoption of this concurrent resolution by both branches of the Legislature, the Chief Clerk of the House is instructed to forward a copy of same to the Radio Commission at Washington, D. C.

On November 11, 1928, as part of the implementation of the Federal Radio Commission's General Order 40, the station was assigned to 630 kHz, sharing this frequency with stations WGBF and KFRU. In 1933 the licensee was changed to the Missouri State Highway Patrol.

During the daytime, WOS shared its frequency with KFRU, although it was allowed to operate simultaneously with WGBF. At night it shared its frequency with both WGBF and KFRU. WOS was deleted on March 27, 1936. The transmitter previously employed by WOS was used by the highway patrol to establish shortwave station KIUK, used exclusively for official business.

In 1937, a new Jefferson City radio station requested the call sign KWOS, in remembrance of the original WOS.

== See also ==
- List of initial AM-band station grants in the United States
