= John Wesley Robinson =

Executed American serial killer

- Sketch of Robinson after his 1896 arrest
- Born: 1867; Nashville, Tennessee, U.S.
- Died: February 15, 1915 (aged 48); Kansas City, Missouri, U.S.
- Cause of death: Execution by hanging
- Convictions: First degree murder (1913); Second degree murder (1896)
- Penalty: Death (1913); 15 years (1896)

Details
- Victims: 3
- Span of crimes: 1896–1913
- Country: United States
- State: Missouri
- Date apprehended: For the final time on May 21, 1913

John Wesley Robinson (1867 – February 15, 1915) was an American serial killer. Originally sentenced to 15 years imprisonment for killing his girlfriend in St. Louis, Missouri in 1896, Robinson would gain notoriety for the double murder of his wife and stepdaughter in Kansas City in 1913. Due to the severity of the latter crime, he was convicted, sentenced to death and subsequently executed for it in 1915.

== Murders ==
=== Ella Jones ===
On the early morning of June 16, 1896, Robinson was suddenly awakened by his girlfriend Ella Jones, who had come to his house to ask him to get her some medicine. When he refused to do so, she accused him of seeing other women, causing Robinson to retaliate by claiming that she was cheating on him and that she planned to poison him. Their arguing quickly turned violent, with Robinson managing to get a tight grip around her neck and choke her to death. He then went to have a glass of water, but was spooked by a breeze that led him to believe that Jones was still alive. Robinson then grabbed a soaked sponge and shoved it down her throat to ensure that she would choke to death. He then went to sleep, with his girlfriend's corpse lying right next to him in bed.

On the following morning, he closed the blinds and left the house, spending most of the day getting drunk. When he sobered up on the next day, Robinson returned to the house and tore up two planks from the kitchen floor and started digging a shallow grave in it. After some time, he eventually gave up and went back to the body, which he carried over to the hole and dumped it inside. Robinson then put a quilt over it, covered it with dirt, and promptly left. Over the next few days, Robinson grew paranoid that somebody would notice that she was missing, so he packed his belongings and left St. Louis, just before Jones' body was found by concerned neighbors.

The day after the discovery, Robinson boarded a steamboat bound for Quincy, Illinois, but was arrested en route by a detective who recognized him. By that time, news of the murder had spread all around the city, causing great anger and outrage amongst the city's white and black communities. While he was being escorted to the Central Police Station, a lynch mob of more than 1,000 people had gathered and threatened to kill Robinson, forcing the detectives to arm themselves to discourage them. While Robinson feared that he would be killed by the angry mob, he appeared to be completely emotionless when questioned by detectives, explaining what had happened to Jones in a calm, collected manner.

==== Investigation and trial ====
In subsequent interviews, Robinson began to claim that he was not the one who had shoved the sponge down Jones' throat. As he had been truthful up until then, detectives summarized that this act might have been done by a friend of his – James "Temp" Temples, who had previously told Robinson that he needed to treat his girlfriend more harshly. After he refused to testify at the coroner's inquest, it was ordered that Robinson should be transferred back to his jail cell at the Central Police Station, but as another mob was forming along the way, investigators had to take another path to there. Upon their arrival, an even bigger crowd had gathered to take a look at the confessed murderer – while the detectives were attempting to hold them back, a spectator managed to sneak from behind and hit Robinson in the back of the head. This greatly frightened the convict, who started begging for his life, but the situation was deescalated and he was safely returned to his cell.

Three days later, Temples was arrested for the unrelated murder of a man after losing a game of craps. When questioned, he offered another version of the story: in his account, Robinson came to him and asked to sleep next to him for the night so he would not be lonely, but during the night, Robinson attempted to choke him to death. Temples said that he managed to overpower him and threatened to cut his throat if he tried to do that again, which successfully dissuaded his friend. Despite this admission, Robinson remained the sole man charged with the case, but was allowed to plead guilty to second-degree murder after striking a deal with Circuit Attorney William Zachritz. As a result, he was convicted of the second-degree murder charge and sentenced to serve 15 years at a state penitentiary. The move was heavily criticized by law enforcement officers, all of whom felt that Robinson's crime was so severe that he deserved to be executed.

=== Mary and Alma Felton Robinson ===
After serving 11 years of his sentence at the Missouri State Penitentiary in Jefferson City, Robinson was paroled on January 12, 1908. Sometime afterwards, he moved to Kansas City, where he met and soon married Mary Felton. The pair resided on 2213 Michigan Avenue together with her daughter from a previous marriage, 11-year-old Alma.

Their marriage proved to be very rocky, as Mary frequently accused Robinson of cheating on her. Fearing that she would attempt to have him returned to jail, he decided to get rid of her. On the evening of April 11, 1913, Robinson got a butcher knife and went to his wife's room, where he choked her to death in her sleep. After assuring himself that she was dead, he proceeded to sever her arms and legs. He then went to Alma's room, where he choked her to death and dismembered her as well. After burning the arms and legs in the stove, he buried Mary's body in the backyard before shoving Alma's remains in a bag. He then went to a nearby pasture and buried them in a shallow grave near a pond.

== Arrest and trial ==
Mary and Alma's absences remained unnoticed for approximately a month, until Mary's remains were discovered by accident by a neighbor. The authorities were quickly notified and an arrest warrant was issued for Robinson, who was caught on May 21 in Lee's Summit. He was immediately returned to the police station, where he readily admitted to killing his wife and stepdaughter, but also accused Mary's half-sister and neighbor, Jennie Hill, of being his accomplice. In his version, Hill supposedly promised that they would run away together if he killed his wife, and when he did so, she personally killed Alma to not leave any witnesses and also because she supposedly did not like the little girl. Like with his previous arrest, it quickly garnered publicity and led to the formation of lynch mobs that demanded that he be killed on the spot.

Soon after, both Robinson and Hill were charged with the murders. While it was initially claimed that Hill had dreamed that a woman's remains had been buried on the Robinson property, she denied that accusation in court and steadfastly maintained that she was innocent. Their preliminary trial attracted great attention from around Kansas City, with many attending the proceedings out of morbid interest. A woman named Fannie Taylor would later come forward and accuse Robinson of being the same man who, under the name 'John Robinson', had killed a wife in Nashville, Tennessee six years prior and then fled the state. In response, Robinson said that while he was indeed born in Nashville, he had left for Missouri a long time ago and was not responsible for this crime. As no follow-up indictments occurred, it is presumed that he was excluded as a suspect in this case.

At his subsequent murder trial, Robinson continued to claim that his account of the crimes – the one that accused Hill of being Alma's killer – was the truthful one. Due to the harrowing nature of the murders and a fear that they would cause a riot, the presiding judge ordered that everyone with the exception of the witnesses leave the courtroom until the end of the proceedings. Robinson was ultimately convicted and attempted to plead guilty to the murders, but this motion was rejected by the judge, who entered a plea of not guilty on the defendant's behalf. In his final statement, he claimed that Robinson's crimes warranted his execution, but he would prefer that a jury of his peers decided his fate. Not long after, Hill – who had been released on bond – was fully exonerated when Robinson finally admitted that her participation in the crimes was a complete fabrication.

== Execution ==
After his conviction, Robinson underwent a psychiatric evaluation that determined that he possessed the intelligence of an 11-year-old child, leading a member of the State Board of Mediation and Arbitration to petition for a reprieve from Governor Elliot Woolfolk Major. Major refused to commute Robinson's sentence and upheld the lower courts' convictions, effectively sealing the convict's fate. Upon hearing this, Robinson remained mostly unfazed, saying in an interview that it did not particularly bother him.

On February 15, 1915, Robinson was hanged at the gallows in Kansas City. He spent the last hours of his life cracking jokes with his cellmate and chatting with prison guards, seemingly resigned to his fate. His last meal consisted of two cups of coffee and an orange, and when brought to the gallows, his final words were said to be "I am happy; I am ready to go." Immediately afterwards, Dr. W. C. Williams, the pastor who had given religious services to Robinson, gave a sermon that was widely praised in the press for its impassioned appeal for citizens to cease sinning and to lead a better life through religion.

== See also ==
- Capital punishment in Missouri
- List of serial killers in the United States
