= Jailhouse Jesus =

Jailhouse Jesus is the colloquial term for an observed psychological phenomenon of new inmates to 'find religion' during their incarceration. Whether it comes from a genuine desire to "repent", an appeal to authority, or other factors is a subject for debate.

== Political Contributions ==
In 1993 the Congress of the United States passed the Religious Freedom Restoration Act after a 1990 decision in Employment Division v. Smith, 494 U.S. 872 which gave the state the power to deny unemployment to individuals who violate the state law against peyote even if used in religious rituals. The law prohibited the government from interfering with the exercise of religion without just cause. Soon after the passing of Religious Freedom Restoration Act, it was overturned after the decision in 1994 in the case of Boerne v. Flores, 521 U.S. 507 where it was decided that it was unconstitutional to apply the law to the states.

Later, Congress passed a federal law recognizing a prisoner's religious rights: the Religious Land Use and Institutionalized Persons Act of 2000 (RLUIPA). This law allows inmates to practice a wide variety of religions without discrimination, as well as attend regular services and possess many religious items. RLUIPA states, "No government shall impose a substantial burden on the religious exercise of a person residing in or confined to an institution" unless that burden "is in furtherance of government interest" and "is the least restrictive means of furthering that compelling government interest".

== Incarceration Accommodations ==
Many jails and prisons have sought out to make sure the constitutional rights of inmates are properly protected. However, institutional safety and security need to be considered. The First Amendment states, "Congress shall make no law respecting an establishment of religion, or prohibiting the free exercise thereof...” The Correctional system often struggles to find a balance between these two contrasting ideals of freedom and safety. Cases dealing with accommodations for religious practices are frequently seen in the court system. Frequently debated topics include, but are not limited to, food choices, clothing and accessory choice, hair length and style, and possession of religious symbols. Laws regarding the rights and privileges of prisons varies by state, and sometimes by establishment. Jails that accept federal prisoners must look at policies, disclosed in the RLUIPA, to determine whether policies and practices are appropriate.

In 1987, Turner v. Safley, 482 U.S. 78, was reviewed by the Supreme Court. The review of this case resulted in the "Turner" test, which allows restrictions to be placed on an inmate's First Amendment rights. There are four defined factors which outlines when an inmate's right can be violated. These conditions are known by every correctional employee and are used in every decision regarding religious items dealing with inmates.

1. Whether there exists a "valid, rational connection' between the prison regulation and the legitimate governmental interest put forward to justify it;"
2. Whether "there are alternative means of exercising the right that remain open to prison inmates;"
3. “[T]he impact accommodation of the asserted constitutional right will have on guards and other inmates, and on the allocation of prison resources generally" and
4. The existence of obvious, easy alternatives may show that the policy is an ”exaggerated response” to legitimate prison concerns.

== Joining Religions While Incarcerated ==
In a study by the National Council on Crime and Delinquency, the researchers concluded that religious prisoners found many benefits in their religion, including an easier time adjusting to prison, safety, and an increased ability to cope. Studies have shown that one of the reasons inmates become involved in religion is to improve their self-concept. Many inmates experience guilt, remorse, and pain as a result of their criminal history and background. Religion helps them to feel better about themselves and thus improve their self-concept in this way.

There are various other reasons inmates may find religion while in prison. Some prisoners may seek to improve their life and the discipline required to practice religion helps them to change and control their actions. Others may join a religious group as a form of protection from other inmates. It is a rarity for a physical altercation to occur in a place of worship, this means prisoners have a high degree of respect for these places. Social interaction is also an important reason for some inmates to join a religious group. These interactions not only allow the benefit of socializing with other people, but also the benefit of exchanging goods and services among each other.

According to the 2013 census, completed by the Bureau of Justice Statistics, the estimated number of inmates in the United States prison system was 1,574,700 people. Of these people, less than 1% (.07%) of inmates identify as atheists, much lower than the percentage of atheists in the non-incarcerated population.
