= Missouri State Penitentiary =

Former prison in Jefferson City, Missouri, United States

Coordinates: 38°34′24″N 92°09′38″W

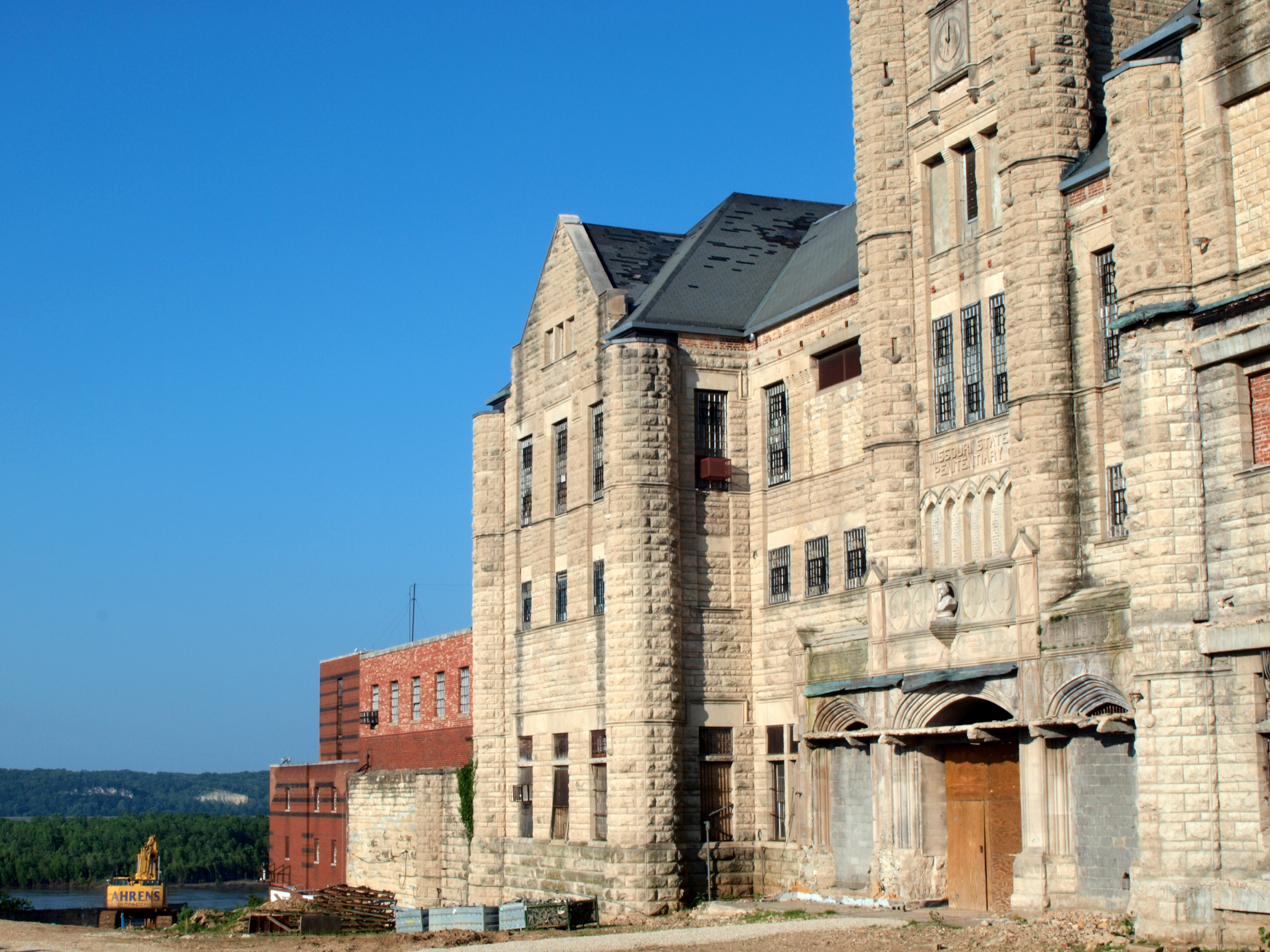

The Missouri State Penitentiary was a prison in Jefferson City, Missouri, that operated from 1836 to 2004. Part of the Missouri Department of Corrections, it served as the state of Missouri's primary maximum security institution. Before it closed, it was the oldest operating penal facility west of the Mississippi River. It was replaced by the Jefferson City Correctional Center, which opened on September 15, 2004. The penitentiary is now a tourist attraction, and guided tours are offered.

== Early history ==
The Missouri State Penitentiary was designed by John Haviland and constructed in the early 1830s to serve the newly admitted (1821) state of Missouri. Jefferson City had been designated the state capital in 1822, and Governor John Miller suggested that the state's main prison be constructed there to help the city maintain its somewhat tenuous status against other towns trying to obtain the capitol for themselves. James Dunnica, a master stonemason who built the first Capitol building in Jefferson City in 1826, was appointed to oversee construction of the new prison, and $25,000 was allotted by the legislature for expenses. The facility opened for business in March 1836, the same month as the fall of the Alamo in Texas.

Prisoners were employed during the 1830s in making bricks; the initial prison population consisted of one guard, one warden, fifteen prisoners, and a foreman for the brick-making operation with an assistant. Eleven of the fifteen prisoners were from St. Louis, and all were incarcerated for larceny except for one, who was imprisoned for stabbing a man during a drunken brawl.

== A-Hall ==
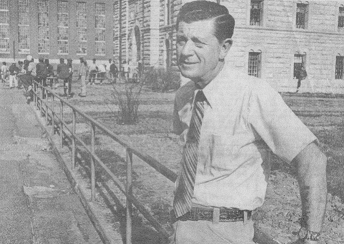
MSP Warden Wyrick. Housing Unit A in background.

A-Hall, also known as Housing Unit A and Housing Unit 4, was completed in 1868. Designed by Warden Horace Swift, the structure was constructed from stone quarried on-site and built primarily using convict labor. The building remained in continuous use as a housing facility until the prison's permanent closure and remains standing as of 2026.

== Notable inmates ==
- Robert Berdella – Serial killer, torturer and rapist, sentenced to life imprisonment without the right to parole in December 1988, deceased in October 1992.
- Charles Arthur "Pretty Boy" Floyd – Was incarcerated on December 18, 1925, for a robbery. Died after being shot by police in 1934.
- Emma Goldman – Anarchist incarcerated in 1917 to 1919 for conspiracy to "induce persons not to register" for the draft. Died from a stroke in 1940.
- Carl Austin Hall and Bonnie Heady – The duo who abducted and brutally murdered a boy named Bobby Greenlease. A week later they were arrested, tried, and sentenced to death. They were both incarcerated here until their execution by gas chamber in 1953.
- Charles Ray Hatcher – Serial killer who murdered 16 victims within a 12-year span; committed suicide in the penitentiary by hanging himself in 1984.
- Charles "Sonny" Liston – A boxer incarcerated in 1950 for a number of charges, including armed robbery. He learned to box in prison and was paroled in 1953. He became World Heavyweight Champion in 1962, only losing 2 years later to Cassius Clay (Muhammad Ali). Died under strange circumstances in 1970.
- Kate Richards O'Hare – Was incarcerated on April 19, 1919, to serve a five-year sentence for an anti-war speech she had given in Bowman, North Dakota, some months earlier. Kate O'Hare's prison sentence was commuted by President Woodrow Wilson in May 1920. Later she was given a full pardon by President Calvin Coolidge. Died in 1948.
- Robert Earl O'Neal – White supremacist who murdered black inmate Arthur Dade while incarcerated at the penitentiary. Executed in 1995 at the Potosi Correctional Center.
- James Earl Ray – The assassin who killed Martin Luther King Jr., Ray was admitted to the penitentiary on March 17, 1960. On April 23, 1967, prisoner #00416J escaped from the Missouri State Penitentiary in a bread box that was supposed to contain loaves of bread that were being transported from M.S.P. to the Renz prison. Somewhere during the trip, Ray escaped. Ray was later convicted for the assassination in 1968. Died of Hepatitis C in 1998.
- Lee Shelton – Better known as "Stagger Lee", "Stack-O-Lee" or simply "Stagolee", American criminal who became a folk icon after he killed Billy Lyons on Christmas in 1895.
- Harry M. Snodgrass - While incarcerated in the mid-1920s, made piano performances over radio station WOS as "The King of the Ivories". Died in 1937.
- Lloyd Leo Anderson, who was executed on February 26, 1965, for the 1961 murder of drugstore delivery boy Thomas Grupe. He was the final convict to be executed via the gas chamber in Missouri.

== Riots ==
In its daily "Times Past" column, the Irish Times ran the following column in 1990 and 2000:

Tired of Irish Stew

Jefferson City, Missouri.

Some five hundred more convicts at the Missouri State Penitentiary mutinied to-day. Seven hundred and fifty prisoners in the same institution struck yesterday, following on the refusal of their demand for grilled meat instead of the continual Irish stew, and refused to leave the dining hall, though they were subsequently persuaded to disperse peaceably by the Governor.

The prisoners to-day, who demand better food and better working conditions, downed tools at all the prison factories. They were quickly marched back to their cells.

The Governor announced tonight that he had discovered an organised plot among the convicts responsible for to-day's riots to set fire to the prison factories and make their escape.

The Irish Times, March 28th, 1930.

On the evening of September 22, 1954, there was a major riot at the Missouri State Penitentiary. It started when two inmates faked illness to attract two guards. Once the guards arrived, inmates ambushed them and took their keys. The inmates then ran down cell blocks and corridors, releasing other inmates in the process. During the incident The Missouri State Highway Patrol, the Missouri National Guard, and police departments from Jefferson City, St. Louis, and Kansas City were called in to help quell the riot. When it was all over, four inmates had been killed, 29 had been injured, and one attempted suicide. Four guards were seriously injured. Several buildings were burned, with damages estimated at $5 million. No inmates were able to escape during the incident. Burned buildings and other damage from the riot would remain visible for the next ten years.

In the summer of 1996, the Missouri State Penitentiary was experiencing a lot of tension between officers and convicts. The Superintendent and Major Eberle reinstated the Search and Response Team. The team managed to ease the tension and help slow the contraband coming into the penitentiary.

== Staff ==
In 1974, Lillian Bonds became the first female correctional officer to work in a male correctional facility. This was also the year that the official job classification for custody staff was changed from "guard" to "correctional officer".

=== Wardens ===
MSP Warden Donald "D.W." Wyrick

Warden Donald "D.W." Wyrick was the youngest, longest tenured, and last "official" warden of the Missouri State Penitentiary. He was the only warden to work his way up through the ranks. In less than fifteen years after beginning as a guard, he became warden of the Missouri State Penitentiary during the most turbulent time in its history. Warden Wyrick was credited on many occasions for keeping the old penitentiary under control when events brought the penitentiary to a boiling point. His extensive knowledge of prisons and extraordinary ability to communicate with convicts led to the capture of escaped convicts, contraband weapons being found, and prevented escapes. He was sought after by many states to oversee their penal systems. Two books have been published about Warden Wyrick: Man of the Big House, Missouri State Penitentiary, A Warden's Warden and If Only the Old Walls Could Talk, The Legend of Warden Wyrick.

== Escapes ==
On October 22, 2003, a murder/escape attempt occurred at Missouri State Penitentiary. Inmate Toby Viles was murdered by two offenders that worked with him in the prison's ice plant. Inmate Shannon Phillips pled guilty of the murder. Inmate Christopher Sims was also present in the Ice Plant during the time of the murder, but has yet to stand trial. Inmate Phillips and Sims were found four days later in a room that the inmates had prepared for an extended stay. The room was concealed from corrections staff until a staff member accidentally hit a hole into the peg board that covered the wall where the small entrance to the room was. The offenders were planning to wait until the closure of M.S.P. to escape.

== Death row ==
From 1938 to 1965, thirty-nine prisoners were executed in the penitentiary's gas chamber. Lloyd Leo Anderson, who was sentenced to death for the 1961 murder of a drugstore delivery boy, was the last person executed in Missouri's gas chamber on February 26, 1965.

On January 6, 1989, inmate George "Tiny" Mercer was executed. It was the last execution to take place at the Missouri State Penitentiary and the first execution by means of lethal injection. The execution took place in the facility's disused gas chamber.

Before April 1989, the State of Missouri's male death row was located at the Missouri State Penitentiary. Death row inmates were held in a below-ground unit and were isolated from other inmates. Death row inmates did not leave their special death row facility, and all services were brought into the unit. Each death row inmate was allowed one hour of exercise per day in a fenced area next to the death row facility. Missouri Department of Corrections said, "With restrictions on movement and limited access to programs, conditions of confinement for death row inmates mirrored those found in other states," and, "As with other states using prison facilities constructed before the turn of the [20th] century, conditions at Missouri State Penitentiary were less than favorable for both death row inmates and staff." After a legal challenge, the Missouri Department of Corrections began to use an internal death row classification system with privileges awarded by behavior, changed the medical services delivery procedures, and provided a "privacy room" where death row inmates could attend religious services.

The Potosi Correctional Center (PCC) opened in 1989. In April 1989, the state transferred its 70 death row inmates from M.S.P. to Potosi.

== Closure ==
In 1991, the name Missouri State Penitentiary was changed to the Jefferson City Correctional Center. In 2003, it was changed back to Missouri State Penitentiary so that there would be no confusion between the old prison and the new one that was being built.

The Missouri State Penitentiary was closed on October 14, 2004, and the new Jefferson City Correctional Center was opened.

== Missouri State Penitentiary Museum ==
The Missouri State Penitentiary Museum is located in the Col. Darwin W. Marmaduke House across Capitol Avenue from the Prison. It features artifacts, photos, and displays about the prison, including a replica cell. The museum also offers guided tours of the historic former prison.

== In popular culture ==
The Travel Channel's television show Destination Fear filmed at the location for the second episode of their third season. It was also featured in Ghost Hunters and Ghost Adventures to investigate the penitentiary's paranormal claims.
