= Leonard Shockley =

American juvenile executed in Maryland

- Born: Leonard Melvin Shockley; 1941; Frankford, Delaware, U.S.
- Died: April 10, 1959 (aged 17); Maryland Penitentiary, Baltimore, Maryland, U.S.
- Cause of death: Execution by gas chamber
- Motive: Robbery
- Conviction: First degree murder
- Penalty: Death

Details
- Victims: Sarah Hearne, 39
- Date: January 16, 1958
- Location: Worcester County, Maryland

Leonard Melvin Shockley (1941– April 10, 1959) was a juvenile executed in the United States on April 10, 1959, for a murder committed when he was under the age of 18. Shockley, a black male, was executed in Maryland in a gas chamber for the murder of shopkeeper Sarah Hearne on January 16, 1958. Shockley (then 16) was involved in the robbery of a small shop in Worcester County, Maryland. He was accompanied by his older brother, 23-year-old Harold Edward Shockley (born January 26, 1936). Hearne was found stabbed several times in the back and breast, and her throat had been cut. The front of her underpants had been torn out.

The young culprits were identified by an eyewitness. Leonard was 17 years of age at the time of his execution, making him the last juvenile to be executed in the United States (further cases of juvenile murderers were punished with death but all were adults at the time of execution, the last in 2003, largely due to extensive appeals processes). His brother received life in prison and was eventually released.

Shockley was the penultimate person to be executed for a crime committed at the age of 16 in the United States. Serial killer Sean Sellers was executed in Oklahoma in 1999, nearly 40 years after the execution of Shockley. Unlike Shockley, however, Sellers was an adult by the time of his execution.

== Background ==
Leonard Melvin Shockley was 16 at the time of the murder. He lived with his parents and several siblings in the rural, unincorporated community of Omar, Delaware. At one point, the family lived near the unincorporated community of Boxiron, Maryland, but they relocated to Omar. Leonard was close to his brother, Harold Edward Shockley, who was 23 years old at the time of the murder. Harold had a previous conviction of larceny, and just days before the murder, he was released from jail on probation. Leonard had stopped attending school, and he had been unemployed for a few weeks.

== Crime ==
On January 16, 1958, the morning of the murder, Leonard drank "almost a pint of wine." He also stated that he had money and had no real reason to commit the robbery. Leonard and Harold brought their sister with them to drop her off at a friend's house; after leaving her, the two decided to commit a robbery in Boxiron.

Leonard and Harold Shockley drove to a store in Boxiron owned by Sarah Hearne, a 39-year-old mother of three. They arrived at approximately 1:00 PM. Evidence suggests that Harold stayed in the car during the beginning of the crime, while Leonard entered the store with a knife in his waistband. When Hearne approached to serve Leonard, Leonard punched her in the face and proceeded to stab her multiple times in the chest and back. Subsequently, he cut her throat with the knife. During the attack, Harold entered the store and tried to open the cash register; he was unable to take any money because the cash register jammed. Leonard and Harold Shockley then fled the scene and drove away, with Leonard behind the wheel.

During the attack, a witness, a black man named Clarence Bishop, saw Leonard and Harold's car outside of the store and heard a scuffle occurring inside. Bishop left the scene to get help from one of Hearne's neighbors. Bishop and the neighbor called the police and then returned to the scene of the crime. By the time they returned, Hearne had walked from the store to her house 95 feet away, where, in front of her stepfather, George Harris, she died from the injuries sustained in the attack. Harris told police that Hearne staggered back into the house and collapsed immediately. Harris summoned an ambulance, but by the time it arrived, Hearne had already died.

== Apprehension ==
Leonard and Harold returned to their home, where they were arrested at 9:15 PM, about eight hours after the murder. They still had Hearne's blood on them, and their car had blood in it as well. Investigators took them to the police station in Georgetown, Delaware, where they separately confessed to their involvement in the crime. They submitted statements that only slightly varied from each other. In Leonard's statement, both he and Harold attacked Sarah Hearne; Leonard also confessed to stabbing the victim and cutting her throat. In Harold's confession, he contended that Leonard entered the store while he stayed in the car and waited. When he heard "scrambling" in the store, he went in to investigate and found Leonard on the floor with the victim after having cut her throat; Harold claimed that he then pulled Leonard off of the victim and left the store with him. The two disposed of several pieces of evidence before returning home, including several articles of clothing containing extensive bloodstains from the victim.

Afterwards, both were transferred to Maryland for trial.

== Trial and appeals ==
Leonard and Harold Shockley were granted a change of venue, moving the cases from Worcester County, Maryland, to Dorchester County. Both brothers underwent mental examinations that confirmed that they were competent to stand trial.

Leonard and Harold were tried separately. Both waived their right to a jury trial, so they were each tried by a three-judge panel. The trials lasted one day each. Leonard was convicted of first degree murder and robbery on April 7, 1958, and sentenced to death. The next day, April 8, Harold was tried and convicted of aiding and abetting Leonard in robbing and murdering Sarah Hearne, and he received a life sentence.

On January 19, 1959, the Maryland Court of Appeals upheld Leonard Shockley's conviction and death sentence. Harold's life sentence was upheld the same day. Harold was released from prison, albeit the date of his release is not known. In July 1999, he was charged with a theft under $300. The matter was placed on the stet docket and subsequently closed. Harold died on October 6, 2001, at the age of 65.

== Execution ==
Leonard Shockley was executed in Maryland's gas chamber on April 10, 1959. The execution began at 10:00 PM, when Shockley was escorted into the gas chamber. One of the witnesses to the execution, Sheila Shields Duncan, fainted at the sight of Shockley. Guards sealed the gas chamber at 10:02 PM, and at 10:03, the pill of hydrogen cyanide dropped into a vat of sulfuric acid. Shockley's last audible words were, "How long will it take?" He died only one minute later, with the prison physician, Dr. Henry W.D. Holljes, pronouncing him dead at 10:04 PM by reading an electrocardiogram attached to Shockley's heart.

== See also ==
- Capital punishment for juveniles in the United States
- Capital punishment in Maryland
- Capital punishment in the United States
- List of people executed in Maryland
- List of people executed in the United States in 1959
- Roper v. Simmons
- Thompson v. Oklahoma

Preceded by Carl Daniel Kier	Executions carried out in Maryland	Succeeded by Nathaniel Lipscomb
