= Sean Sellers =

American killer (1969–1999)

- Born: May 18, 1969; Corcoran, California, U.S.
- Died: February 4, 1999 (aged 29); Oklahoma State Penitentiary, Oklahoma, U.S.
- Status: Executed by lethal injection
- Motive: Revenge (first murder); Satanic ritual
- Conviction: First degree murder (3 counts)
- Penalty: Death (1986)

Details
- Victims: 3
- Date: September 7, 1985; March 4, 1986
- Country: United States
- State: Oklahoma
- Weapon: Handgun
- Date apprehended: March 6, 1986

Sean Richard Sellers (May 18, 1969 – February 4, 1999) was an American serial killer and one of 22 people in the United States since the reinstatement of capital punishment in 1976 to be executed for a crime committed while under the age of 18, and the only one to have been executed for a crime committed under the age of 17. Sellers was the first person to be executed for a crime committed at the age of 16 since 1959. His case drew worldwide attention due to his age as well as his jailhouse conversion to Christianity and his claim that demonic possession made him innocent of his crimes.

== Crimes ==
Sellers and his best friend, Richard Howard, had discussed how it would feel to kill someone. Sellers later confessed to the September 8, 1985, murder of Robert Paul Bower, a 36-year-old Circle K convenience store clerk who had refused to sell beer to Howard. According to Howard, who was present for but did not participate in the murder, Sellers "wanted to see what it feels like to kill somebody."

Sellers said he decided to kill his mother after a fight over his girlfriend, whom his mother did not like. He had served his mother several cups of coffee laden with rat poison, but it did not work. On March 5, 1986, Sellers shot and killed his mother Vonda, 32, and stepfather Paul "Lee" Bellofatto, 43, with a .44 caliber revolver while they were asleep in the bedroom of their Oklahoma City home. Wearing only underwear to limit blood spatter on himself, he first shot his stepfather. The shot awoke his mother, whom he shot in the face. Sellers tried to disguise his guilt by arranging the crime scene to look as if an intruder had committed the killings.

Howard testified that after the murders, Sellers came to his house and said he had killed his parents. Howard was also initially charged with first degree murder, but the charged was dismissed and he received a five-year suspended sentence for being an accessory after the fact after agreeing to testify against Sellers.

== Avowal of Satanism at trial ==
At his trial, Sellers said he was a practicing Satanist at the time of the murders and claimed that demonic possession (by the demon "Ezurate") caused him to murder his victims. In later documents, he claimed to have read The Satanic Bible by Anton LaVey "hundreds of times" between the ages of 15 and 16, when the crimes were committed, and in a "confession" letter written from prison, he reflected on this period of his life: "I got very involved in Satanism. I truly thought it was an honest way to live, and the rituals of it would enable me to control my life."

His attorneys also argued Sellers was addicted to the game Dungeons & Dragons, although Sellers would later write that the game had no part in his crimes and that "using my past as a common example of the effects of the game is either irrational or fanatical."

The jury refused to consider either claim, and Sellers was found guilty of multiple homicides and sentenced to death in 1986. At the time, Oklahoma law did not give juries the option of giving a life sentence without the possibility of parole (that choice became available in 1987). One juror later said that the jury feared that Sellers would be paroled in 7 to 15 years, and that this prison term was not lengthy enough. This led the jury to vote for a death sentence. However, other jurors denied that this was part of the deliberations.

== Conversion to Christianity ==
Sellers became a Christian while in prison. His friends started a website on his behalf, and he campaigned for clemency based on his religious conversion, age, and involvement in Satanism. While on death row, Sellers made numerous appearances in the mass media, appearing on The Oprah Winfrey Show and on a notorious segment of Geraldo about Satanism. He appeared in documentaries about Satanism and serial killers for 48 Hours, MSNBC, WNS NEWS and the A&E Network. Sellers married in prison on February 14, 1995, but the marriage was annulled in 1997.

Sellers's step-siblings doubted that his conversion to Christianity was a sincere one. Of his many surviving family members, only his step-grandfather believed his conversion to be sincere. However, the prison chaplain believed he had truly converted.

== Appeals and execution ==
During his 1999 appeal to the 10th U.S. Circuit Court of Appeals, Sellers contended he had multiple personality disorder (now dissociative identity disorder). The appellate court ruled that there was "uncontroverted evidence" of Sellers' religious conversion and that he may indeed suffer from multiple personality disorder. The panel of judges concluded that while Sellers might have been insane at the time of his crimes, the claim was made too late to be raised on appeal. Human Rights Watch condemned this decision to "[uphold] the sentence on narrow procedural grounds" despite the "acknowledged 'uncontested clinical evidence' that Sellers suffers from multiple personality disorder", adding in its letter to Governor Keating that "No civilized society can accept the execution of a person who was a child at the time he committed his crimes and who was – and remains – afflicted with a mental disorder. Such an execution offends the most basic principles of international justice and morality." In its 1999 letter HR Watch observed also that since 1990, the only other countries known to have executed juvenile offenders besides the United States of America were Bangladesh, Iran, Iraq, Nigeria, Pakistan, Saudi Arabia, Sudan and Yemen.

Psychiatric experts scoffed at Sellers' claim, arguing that any true mental illness would have been diagnosed soon after Sellers' arrest and not seven years later. Prison officials also cast doubt on Sellers' mental illness by saying they saw Sellers rehearsing the evidence of mental illness and receiving coaching from his attorneys.

Sellers made the same insanity claim to his clemency board, but the board refused to consider the issue. The board appeared to be swayed by prison officials' statements, the lengthy time delay in diagnosing the illness, and statements by Sellers' accomplice that he had seen no evidence of multiple personality. "The only thing that worried him was getting caught," Richard Howard wrote.

Sellers appealed to the U.S. Supreme Court, but the court declined his appeal.

Two days before his execution, Sellers filed two more appeals. The first appeal, made in federal district court, accused the state Pardon and Parole Board of violating his civil rights. Sellers argued the pardon board's decisions were not impartial and were, instead, capricious. The appeal was denied, the issue having been considered and rejected by state courts numerous times (and recently as well). A second appeal, filed with the state Court of Criminal Appeals, claimed the state appellate court made a mistake by ruling Sellers had waived his insanity claim at trial. The state appellate court admitted it used the wrong legal justification in deciding Sellers' waiver of mental illness; the court; nevertheless, Sellers' appeal was rejected after reconsidering the case on the merits raised by Sellers' defense team.

Sellers' imminent execution brought condemnation from a wide variety of sources, including the European Union, Archbishop Desmond Tutu, the American Bar Association, and Bianca Jagger. Nearly all raised issues about his age at the time of the crimes, and many argued that his religious work from prison outweighed the state's need to execute him.

Sellers was executed by lethal injection on February 4, 1999, at the Oklahoma State Penitentiary in McAlester, Oklahoma, at 12:17 a.m., five minutes after the lethal drugs were injected. For his last meal, he had Chinese food: eggrolls, sweet-and-sour shrimp, and batter-fried shrimp. He began his final statement by addressing his step-siblings:

All the people that are hating me right now and are here waiting to see me die, when you wake up in the morning, you're not going to feel any different. You're going to hate me just as much tomorrow as tonight.

When you wake up and nothing has changed inside, reach out to God and He will be there for you. Reach out to God and He will heal you. Let Him touch your hearts. Don't hate all your lives.

I love you all.

In the final minutes before injection Sellers sang modern Christian music, then said loudly, "Here I come, Father; I'm coming home." He then turned to the warden: "Let's do it, Gary. Let's get it on." Sellers finally sang his last words: "Set my spirit free that I might praise Thee. Set my spirit free that I might worship Thee."

Sellers's stepsiblings objected to the substance of his final remarks, that instead of apologizing or mentioning their mother, he only "...addressed the fact that we would still feel the same. It is very presumptuous that he would know how we would still feel," said his stepsister.

== Aftermath ==
Sellers was the first and remains the only person executed in the U.S. for a crime committed under the age of 17 since the reinstatement of the death penalty in 1976. The U.S. Supreme Court ruling in Roper v. Simmons, 542 U.S. 551 (2005) later decided it was unconstitutional to execute an individual for a crime committed under the age of 18.

While in prison, Sellers authored a book of love stories and poems titled Shuladore. The book was self-published, and sold via his Web site. Under Oklahoma law, a defendant cannot "receive any proceeds or profits from any source" as a direct or indirect result of his crime. An Oklahoma grand jury investigated whether Sellers or his friends received profits from the sale of the book, but no indictment was forthcoming. A Christian book publisher issued Sellers's autobiography, Web of Darkness, in 1990.

== See also ==
- List of people executed in Oklahoma
- List of people executed in the United States in 1999
- List of serial killers in the United States
- Roper v. Simmons: 2005 U.S. Supreme Court ruling that the execution of those under 18 (at the time of committing the capital crime) is unconstitutional.
- Thompson v. Oklahoma: 1988 U.S. Supreme Court ruling that the execution of those who committed their crime when under the age of 16 is unconstitutional.
- Leonard Shockley, penultimate juvenile offender to be executed for a crime committed at the age of 16 in the United States

== Sources ==
- Dawkins, Vickie L. and Higgins, Nina Downey. Devil Child. Paperback ed. New York: St. Martins Press, 1989; ISBN 0-312-91533-0
- Sellers, Sean. Web of Darkness. 2nd ed. Tulsa, Okla.: Victory House Publishers, 1990; ISBN 0-932081-26-6
- Trostle, Lawrence C. and Green, Melissa S. "The Devil Made Me Do It: Adolescent Attraction to Satanism". In Society: An Alaskan Perspective. Rev. ed. Sharon Araji, ed. Dubuque, IA: Kendall/Hunt Publishing, 1996; ISBN 0-8403-9172-2
- Sean Richard Sellers, at the Office of the Clark County Prosecuting Attorney.
