= Dalton Prejean =

American murderer controversially executed by the state of Louisiana (1959-1990)

- Born: December 10, 1959; Lafayette, Louisiana, U.S.
- Died: May 18, 1990 (aged 30); Louisiana State Penitentiary, Louisiana, U.S.
- Status: Executed by electrocution
- Conviction: First degree murder (2 counts)
- Penalty: Death (May 11, 1978)

Details
- Victims: 2
- Date: May 31, 1974; July 2, 1977
- Country: United States
- State: Louisiana

Dalton Prejean (December 10, 1959 – May 18, 1990) was one of 22 people in the United States executed for crimes committed as a juvenile prior to the decision Roper v. Simmons in 2005. He was tried, convicted, and executed in the electric chair in Louisiana for the murder of Louisiana State Police Trooper Donald Cleveland. Prejean, then 17, committed this murder shortly after his release from juvenile detention for murdering a cab driver during a botched robbery when he was 14. Prejean was the first juvenile offender to be executed after Stanford v. Kentucky, which initially confirmed the death penalty for juvenile offenders who were at least 16 years old.

The case received international attention because Prejean was black, was convicted by an all-white jury, had brain damage, was borderline intellectually disabled, and was 17 at the time of the murder.

Prejean's son, Dalton Prejean Jr., born while his father was awaiting execution, himself went to prison for the 2001 murder of his 14-month old stepson. Prejean Jr., who pleaded guilty to manslaughter and two counts of child cruelty is currently serving a 60-year sentence, with parole eligibility in 40 years, at the same prison where his father was executed.

== Background ==
Prejean was the second of four children. When he was two weeks old, his parents sent him from their home in Lafayette to live with his aunt and uncle in Houston, Texas. Dalton was unaware of his true parentage until the age of eleven. When Dalton's father left his mother and moved to Houston, the aunt decided that Dalton had to be told that he was not her child. Around this time, he began creating problems of an unknown nature, and was sent to live with his mother in Lafayette.

Dalton began skipping school following his return to Lafayette. In March 1972, he was committed to the Louisiana Training Institute for truancy at the insistence of his mother. Released after seven months, he soon came into conflict with the authorities on charges of burglary, theft, and "false firearms." In March 1974, he was committed to the Lafayette Juvenile Youth Authority, a residential program for delinquents. He ran away from that facility after a month. After his return, his commitment was terminated and he was released on probation to his mother.

In June 1974, Dalton was arrested for the murder of John Doucet, a taxi driver. In a later statement about the incident, Dalton said he and two friends, one of whom had a gun, called a cab with the intention of robbing the driver. They directed the driver to a quiet part of town and persuaded him to stop while they searched for an address. Dalton insisted on taking the gun from his companion because the other youth appeared to be nervous. Dalton approached the driver, and believing that the driver was reaching for a gun of his own, fired twice and began running. While fleeing, he told a passerby to call an ambulance. Dalton later turned himself in to police and admitted to killing the driver. He was tried as a juvenile, found delinquent in first degree murder, and admitted to the Louisiana Training Institute.

A psychiatric evaluation of Dalton was performed in 1974. He was found to be intellectually limited and to have very poor judgment. Dalton was diagnosed as having borderline intellectual disability, and it was questionable if he knew the difference between right and wrong. The psychiatrist considered the boy to be "a definite danger to himself and others, and his dream content suggests that it is a matter of accident that the cab driver was killed rather than the boy being killed. He is equally likely to get himself killed in the near future." The psychiatrist therefore recommended a lengthy confinement, followed by transfer to permanent facilities. The juvenile courts had jurisdiction over the defendant until he was 21. The doctor's recommendation would have served to keep the Prejean confined until December 10, 1980.

In 1976, however, another doctor conducted a psychiatric evaluation of the defendant and recommended that he be discharged. He concluded that the defendant's values had changed, but cautioned that "suitable conditions (should be) imposed to be sure he had adequate supervision and is going to live in a fairly stable environment." That doctor also suggested that fairly rigid probation requirements be imposed. On December 10, 1976, Prejean was released to the custody of his aunt in Houston without any probation requirements. Within seven months, Dalton was once more under arrest for murder.

== Crime ==
At about five o'clock in the morning of July 2, 1977, Prejean, his brother Joseph, Michael George, and Michael Broussard left Roger's Nite Club in Lafayette Parish. The four had spent the night drinking in various lounges in the vicinity. They left Roger's Nite Club in a 1966 Chevrolet driven by Dalton, with his brother in the front seat and the other two in the back. The car's taillights were not working, and within a few hundred feet of the lounge, Trooper Donald Cleveland, who was on his way to work driving his police vehicle, signaled the Chevrolet to stop. Prejean and his brother attempted to switch places in the front seat because the defendant had been driving without a license. The trooper noticed the switch and ordered the occupants out of the car. He told Michael George and Michael Broussard to get back in and began to search Joseph Prejean. Dalton Prejean, back in the car, stated in reaction to the trooper's pushing Joseph against the car, over Joseph's protest, "I don't like the way he's doing my brother." Dalton then took a .38 caliber revolver from under the car seat, got out of the car and approached the officer with the gun hidden against his leg. As he neared the trooper, he fired without warning. Trooper Cleveland was struck by two bullets and was killed. Dalton and his companions fled the scene but were apprehended several hours later.

Dalton was once again given psychological tests during pretrial confinement. On the basis of the Wechsler Intelligence Scale, the Stanford Binet Vocabulary Subtest and the Bender-Gestalt Test, Dr. William Hawkins determined that he functioned at the dull normal level in the verbal area, but in the borderline intellectual disability area in the performance area. He had a verbal IQ of 82 and a performance IQ of 72. His full scale IQ was 76, with a full scale mental age of 13 years and six months.

== Trial and appeals ==
Dalton Prejean was charged by grand jury indictment with first-degree murder in violation of Louisiana Revised Statute 14:30. Because of pretrial publicity, the trial was transferred from Lafayette Parish to Ouachita Parish. After a three-day bifurcated trial beginning on May 1, 1978, twelve all-white jurors found Prejean guilty as charged and unanimously recommended the death penalty. His attorneys appealed the conviction and sentence, raising eleven assignments of error.

During the sentencing phase, the defense argued that Prejean's mental condition and intoxication had impaired his capacity to appreciate the criminality of his conduct or conform his conduct to the law. Psychological testing conducted during his pretrial confinement found a verbal IQ of 82, a performance IQ of 72, and a full-scale IQ of 76; the examiner reported a full-scale mental age of 13 years and 6 months. A 1974 psychiatric evaluation described Prejean as intellectually limited and having very poor judgment. His psychiatric history included confinement in several institutions between 1972 and 1976 and diagnoses including schizophrenia and depression. Later accounts of the case described his childhood neglect and abuse as additional mitigating circumstances.

Prejean's subsequent appeals reached the U.S. Supreme Court. In November 1989, the Court granted a stay of execution shortly before his scheduled execution. On April 17, 1990, the Court lifted the stay without comment, clearing the way for the execution to proceed. The case attracted international attention. On May 17, 1990, the European Parliament adopted a resolution calling on Louisiana Governor Buddy Roemer to commute Prejean's death sentence. Amnesty International also campaigned for clemency. Its southern regional director, Steve Herrick, said, "I doubt that in documented recent world history there is an execution [with] such a pile of reasons not to do it."

On November 28, 1989, the Louisiana Board of Pardons voted 3–2 to recommend that Prejean's death sentence be commuted to life imprisonment without parole. The majority cited his childhood abuse, mental deficiencies, remorse, and behavior during his years on death row. Roemer rejected the recommendation and denied clemency. He later described the decision as the most difficult of his career. Roemer said he declined to intervene because Prejean's victim, Louisiana State Police trooper Donald Cleveland, had been a police officer.

"On behalf of 780 state troopers, and thousands of police officers who put their lives on the line every day, the execution will proceed."

Shortly before the execution, Roemer agreed to speak with Prejean by telephone. There is no record of the conversation, but earlier that week Prejean had described what he wanted to tell the governor:

"I'd like to have a chance at life. To live with my mistakes. We all make mistakes in life. Some bigger than others. I'd like to give something back to society. I've changed. There's a whole difference between being 17 and 30."

Prejean's attorney, John Hall, later spoke with Roemer by telephone. Hall recalled that Roemer said he would not be able to sleep that night, but then added,

"Of course, the person having a terrible time tonight was Dalton."

== Execution ==
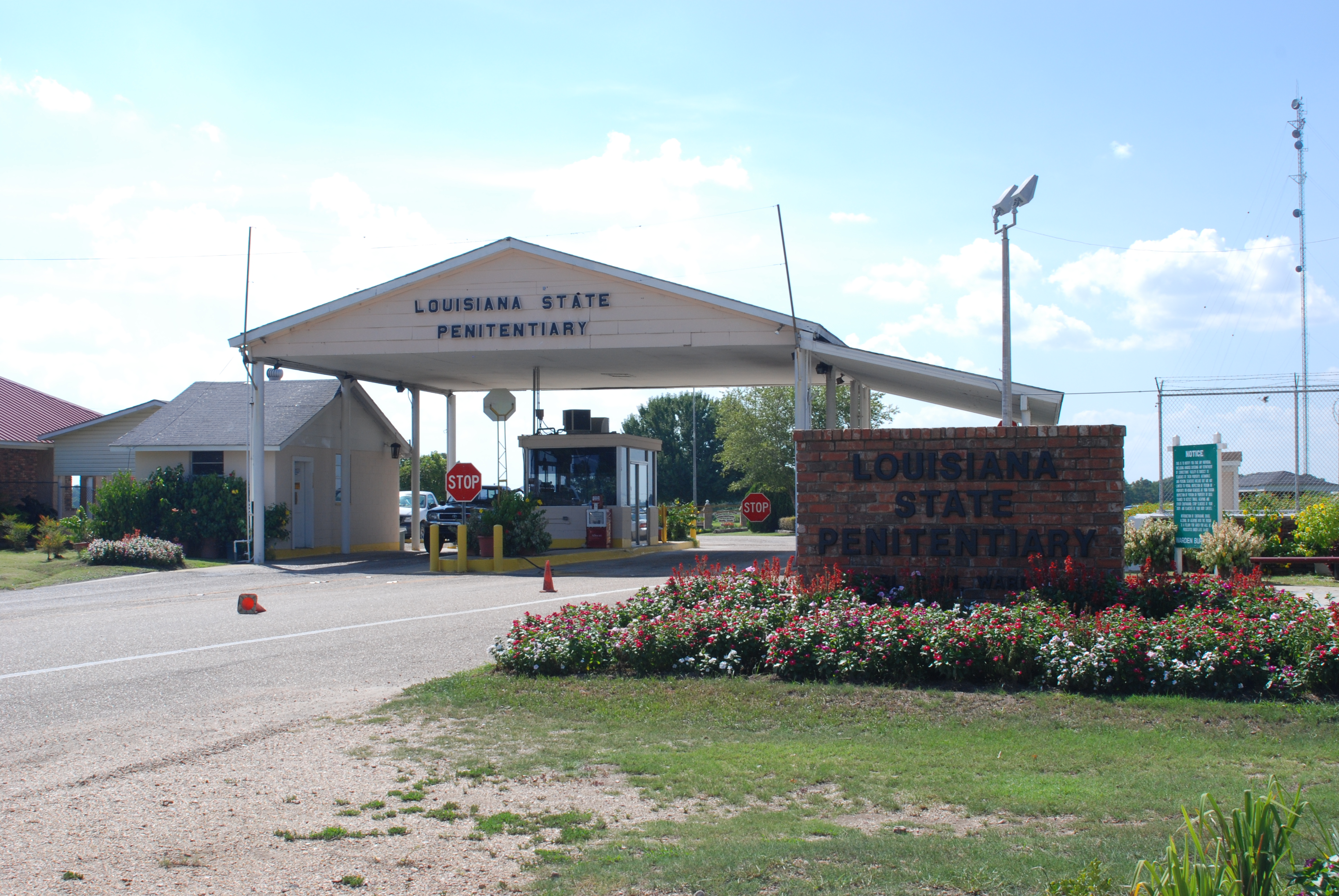
Louisiana State Penitentiary in Angola, Louisiana

On May 18, 1990, Prejean was executed in the electric chair at Louisiana State Penitentiary in Angola. He was the first juvenile offender to be executed after Stanford v. Kentucky, which had upheld the constitutionality of executing offenders who were at least 16 years old when they committed their crimes. He was the first juvenile offender executed in Louisiana since 1948 and, because the U.S. Supreme Court prohibited the execution of offenders who were under 18 at the time of their crimes in 2005, he was also the last.

His final statement was:

"One mistake ... 13 years ago, and that's a long time. Nothing is going to be accomplished. I have peace with myself. I'd like to thank all of those who supported me all these years. I'd also like to thank my loved ones for being strong … My son will be a better person for not letting something like this bring down his life … Keep strong, keep pushing, keep praying. To the Cleveland family, they say it wasn't for the revenge, but it's hard for me to see, to understand. I hope they're happy. So I forfeit my life. I give my love to all. God bless."

== See also ==
- Capital punishment for juveniles in the United States
- Capital punishment in Louisiana
- Capital punishment in the United States
- List of people executed in Louisiana
- List of people executed in the United States in 1990
- Roper v. Simmons: 2005 U.S. Supreme Court ruling that the execution of those under 18 (at the time of committing the capital crime) is unconstitutional.
- Thompson v. Oklahoma: 1988 U.S. Supreme Court ruling that the execution of those who committed their crime when under the age of 16 is unconstitutional.

Executions carried out in Louisiana
Preceded by Edward Byrne Jr. June 14, 1988	Dalton Prejean; May 18, 1990	Succeeded by Andrew Lee Jones July 22, 1991
Executions carried out in the United States
Preceded by Johnny Anderson – Texas May 17, 1990	Dalton Prejean – Louisiana; May 18, 1990	Succeeded by Thomas Baal – Nevada June 3, 1990
