= Shaka Sankofa =

Executed by the state of Texas 2000

- Born: Gary Lee Graham; September 5, 1963; Houston, Texas, U.S.
- Died: June 22, 2000 (aged 36); Huntsville Unit, Texas, U.S.
- Children: 2
- Status: Executed by lethal injection
- Convictions: Capital murder Aggravated robbery (10 counts)
- Penalty: Death

Shaka Sankofa (born Gary Lee Graham; September 5, 1963 – June 22, 2000) was a Texas death-row inmate who was sentenced to death at the age of 17 for the murder of 53-year-old Bobby Grant Lambert during a deadly 1981 crime spree in Houston, Texas, that also included at least 10 armed robberies and a rape.

Sankofa was scheduled to be executed five times: once in 1987, three times in 1993 (April, in which Lambert's widow Loretta appealed to Governor Ann Richards to spare Sankofa's life; May and August), and once on January 11, 1999; each time he was given a stay of execution before it was later lifted.

He was executed by lethal injection on June 22, 2000, in Huntsville, Texas.

== Background ==
Gary Lee Graham was born to Thelma Griffin and Willie Graham.

On May 13, 1981, Graham murdered Bobby Lambert while attempting to rob him in a Safeway supermarket parking lot. In the days after the murder, Graham committed numerous assaults, a rape, and at least ten armed robberies. A 57 year old female taxi driver directed police to Graham after he had robbed and raped her. Graham was asleep in bed when police arrived and arrested him.

Graham denied committing the murder, but admitted to the other crimes he committed during the week-long spree. The facts of those crimes bore similarities to the attempted robbery and murder of Lambert, including assaulting some of the victims in parking lots, threatening to shoot the victims, and in one case beating and shooting another victim.

Graham was convicted of ten armed robberies and murder.

== Legal proceedings ==
Graham was convicted of Lambert's murder based on the testimony of one eyewitness who the jury found to be credible. She identified Graham in a police line-up.

During the appeals process he told his new court-appointed attorney that his counsel did not call alibi witnesses during the trial. Two alibi witnesses testified at a hearing in 1988. In the seven years between conviction and the appeals hearing the witnesses had never visited Graham in jail, they had never contacted the police or told anyone that Graham had been with them the night of the murder. The appeals judge found that the witnesses were not credible and ruled against Graham.

The NAACP Legal Defense Fund and other supporters were able to get a copy of police reports that the prosecutors had refused to turn over to them. In those reports they found a ballistics report that they said proved the weapon used to kill Lambert was not the same gun that police found when Graham was arrested. Houston prosecutors have refuted these claims publicly. They say the gun was not presented as evidence of guilt during the trial and if evidence of weapons had been presented to the jury it would have included the multiple weapons Graham used to commit his many crimes during his entire crime spree.

The jury did not hear testimony from a few other apparent eyewitnesses who believed that Graham was not the killer because they believed he was too short to be the killer. They did not see his face. No other suspects were questioned and there was a lack of physical evidence. Supporters also argued that there was other crucial evidence the jury did not hear and that he had poor legal representation at the time of his trial.

The United States Supreme Court did not extend the prohibition on the juvenile death penalty to 17-year olds until Roper v. Simmons (2005). Roper said that "the age of 18 is the point where society draws the line for many purposes between childhood and adulthood." Roper overturned Stanford v. Kentucky (1988) which had upheld the death penalty for crimes committed by 16 and 17 year olds. The death penalty has been barred for those 15 and younger since Thompson v. Oklahoma was decided in 1988.

Lambert was murdered in 1981. Texas was one of the states that allowed the death penalty for 17 year olds. Youth was considered a mitigating factor at sentencing. Graham's post-conviction claims argued that the Texas statute required the jury to impose the death penalty when certain conditions were met such as a finding of "future dangerousness". Graham argued that this prevented the jury from weighing mitigating circumstances like his youth and difficult childhood. After Penry v. Lynaugh was decided a divided panel of the Fifth Circuit Court of Appeals vacated his death sentence but it was reinstated by an en banc rehearing.

== Reaction ==
Sankofa's execution became a campaign issue in the 2000 presidential election. Jesse Jackson compared candidate George W. Bush to Pontius Pilate (implicitly comparing Sankofa to Jesus Christ). The National Review criticized Sankofa's supporters who had raised no objection when Arkansas governor Bill Clinton paused his 1992 presidential campaign to oversee the execution of a man with brain damage.

As support for Graham's cause grew the eyewitness who picked Graham out of the police line-up began to experience harassment related to the case.

Sankofa's supporters, including Coretta Scott King, bishop Desmond Tutu, Al Sharpton, Jesse Jackson, and celebrities Danny Glover, Kenny Rogers, Lionel Richie, Harry Belafonte and Ruby Dee, brought his case international attention, arguing that his conviction was based on the testimony of a single eyewitness who said she saw him for a few seconds in the dark parking lot committing the murder.

== Incarceration ==
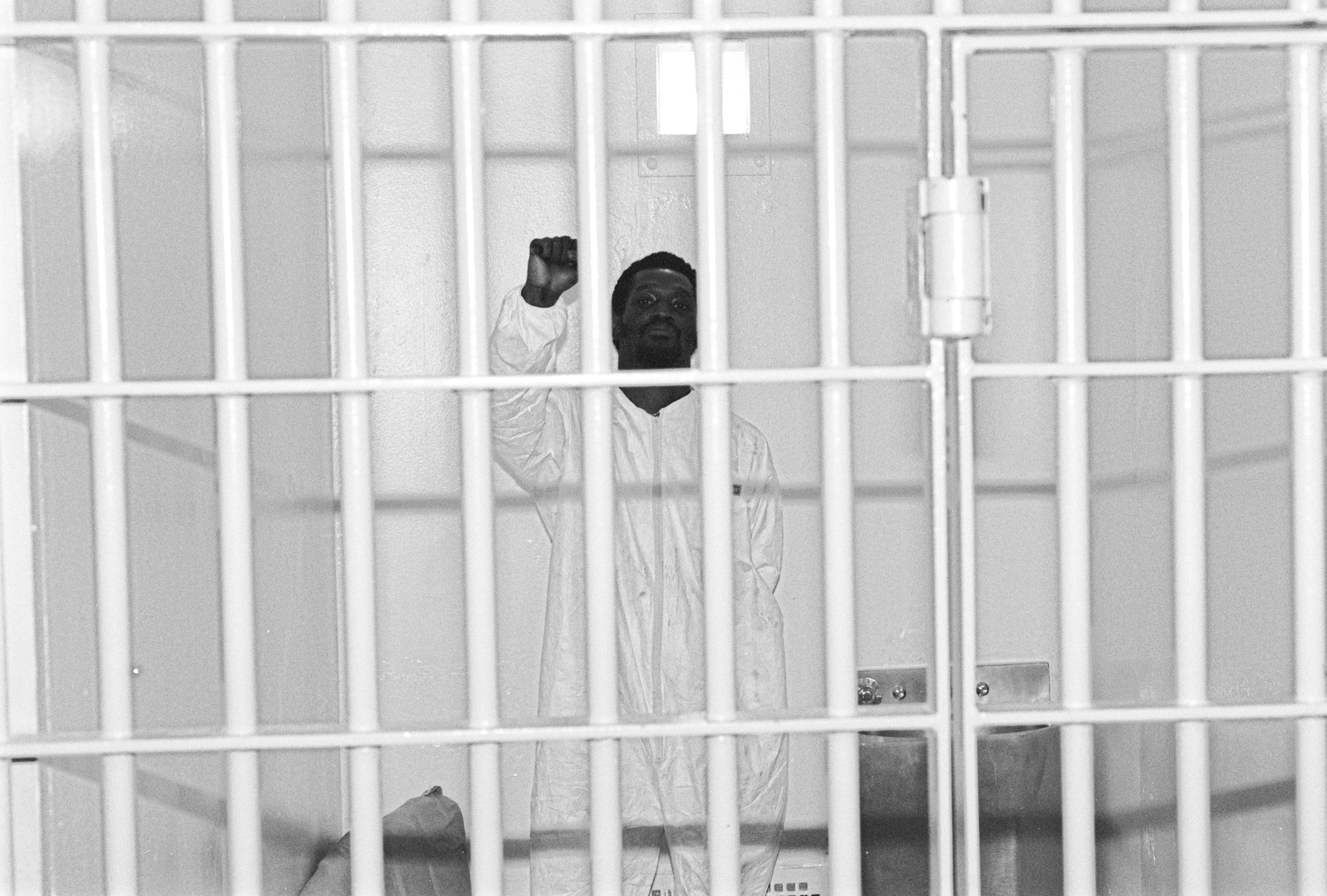
Graham (Shaka Sankofa) raises his fist in defiance prior to his execution

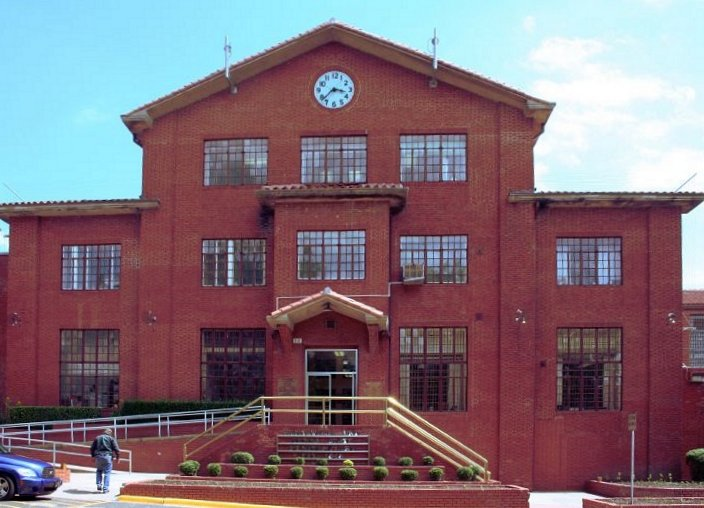
Huntsville Unit, where Sankofa was put to death

Sankofa entered the Texas Department of Criminal Justice (TDCJ) as inmate #696 on November 9, 1981. Sankofa was initially located in the Ellis Unit, but was transferred to the Allan B. Polunsky Unit (formerly the Terrell Unit) in 1999.

In prison, Sankofa learned to read and write, earning his GED and paralegal certification. From the day of his arrest, he acknowledged portions of his week-long crime spree. For these crimes, he had served almost two decades in prison, apologizing verbally and in writing to the victims of these crimes and asked young people to turn their backs on criminal conduct. He became an activist and, in 1995, changed his name from Gary Lee Graham to Shaka Sankofa. The name "Shaka" was chosen in honor of the South African warrior Shaka Zulu.

== Execution ==
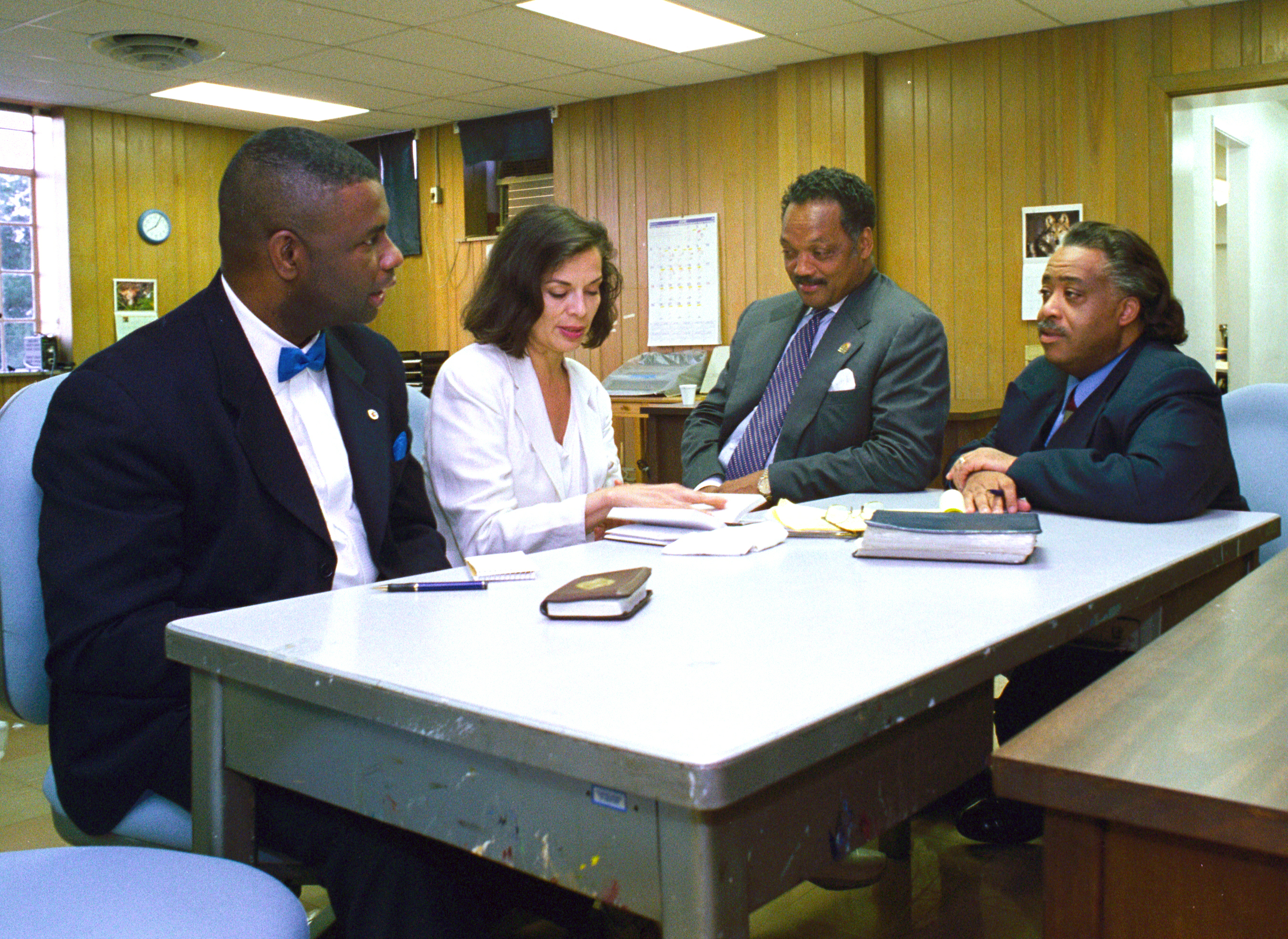
Robert Muhammad, Bianca Jagger, Jesse Jackson and Al Sharpton talk privately before witnessing the execution

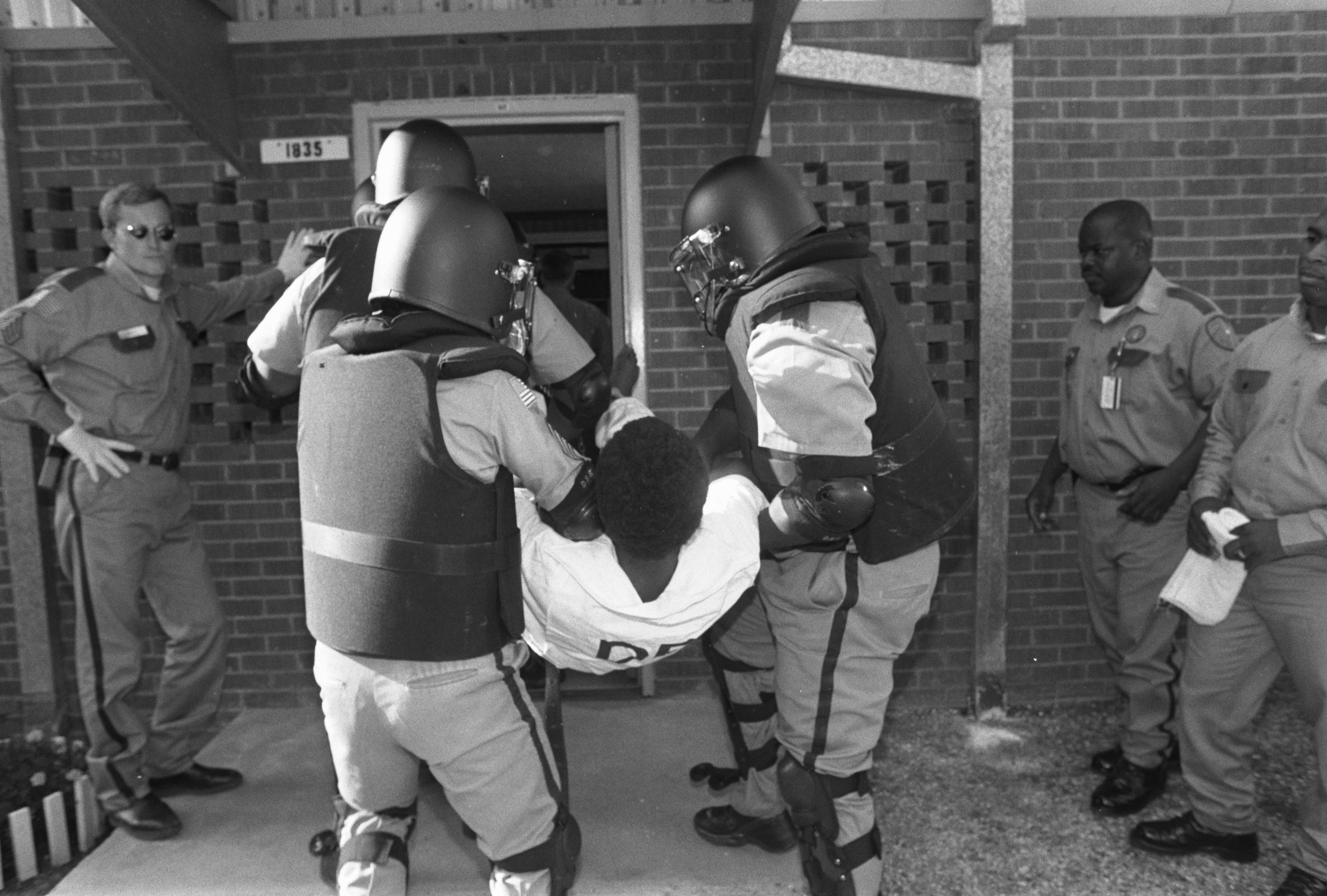
Sankofa is carried into the Texas death house by a team of correctional officers prior to his execution

After the appeals had failed, Sankofa resisted when the time came for him to be taken to the death chamber. A cell extraction team was dispatched to force him towards the death chamber, where it took five jail guards to strap him to the gurney.

Sankofa released a final statement in which he called his execution a "legal lynching" and "genocide in America". He called on his followers to "take this down to international court and file a lawsuit". He said his "lynching will be avenged" and the "revolution will go on".

Witnesses to the execution on Sankofa's behalf included Bianca Jagger, Rev. Jesse Jackson and Rev. Al Sharpton. Jackson said he wept.

At the time of his execution, Sankofa became the 23rd inmate executed in Texas during 2000 and the 222nd person to be executed in Texas since capital punishment was resumed there in 1982. Hundreds of pro- and anti-death penalty demonstrators gathered outside the prison where Sankofa was executed. Police in riot gear managed parading Ku Klux Klan and New Black Panther Party members.

== Funeral and memorial service ==
More than 2000 people attended Sankofa's wake on June 28, 2000, and his funeral the following day. He was buried at Paradise North Cemetery in Houston in a gold-colored casket, wearing a turquoise and gold African garment.

== See also ==
- Capital punishment for juveniles in the United States
- Capital punishment in Texas
- Capital punishment in the United States
- List of people executed in Texas, 2000–2009
- List of people executed in the United States in 2000
