= Michelle Lyons =

American spokeswoman and reporter

Michelle Lyons (/ˈlaɪənz/ "lions"; born 1975 or 1976) is an American crime reporter, author and former Public Information Director for the Texas Department of Criminal Justice, best known for witnessing almost 300 executions in Texas.

== Early life and education ==
Michelle Lyons was born in Galveston, Texas in 1975 or 1976. (Note: Javier Cruz was executed in 1998, and Lyons was 22 when she witnessed his execution, which means that she was born in 1975 or 1976.) Her father began his career as a reporter at The Daily News and met her mother while she was working as a records clerk at the Galveston Police Department. Lyons was raised in Galveston, attending the island's famous Ball High School until 1992, when her family relocated to Southern Illinois after her sophomore year for her father's job. She attended Benton Consolidated High School in Benton, Illinois, graduating in 1994 and then moving back to Texas to attend Texas A&M University in College Station where she would earn a bachelor's degree in journalism in 1997.

== Journalism career ==
Lyons began her journalism career at the age of 16, working for The Benton Evening News as a photographer and a darkroom assistant, developing film and printing photos for each of the newspaper's six-day daily editions. Once in college, she became a staff writer for Texas A&M's student newspaper, The Battalion, before joining the staff of The Bryan-College Station Eagle, first as a part-time reporter covering spot news and obituaries and then later, as a full-time police reporter and then education reporter. In April 1998, Lyons joined The Huntsville Item as one of three full-time reporters, originally covering The City of Huntsville, Sam Houston State University, feature stories and breaking news. In January 2000, she moved to covering the Texas Department of Criminal Justice as the prison beat reporter, at a time when the Item had one of five witness spots to cover every execution carried out in the State of Texas. In interviews, Lyons has stated that while she knew the job would entail witnessing some executions, many years had seen fewer than 10 carried out in a single year, so she did not predict her first year covering the prison system would coincide with Texas' record-breaking 40 executions carried out in 2000, of which Lyons witnessed 38.

=== Death penalty coverage and TDCJ spokeswoman ===
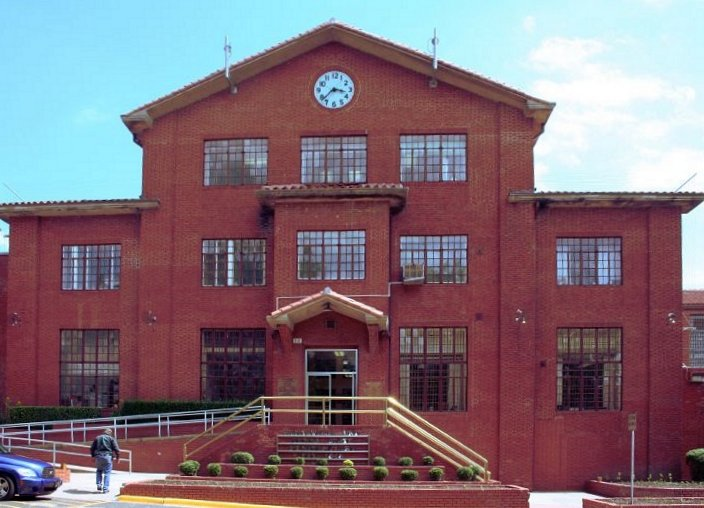
Huntsville Unit in Huntsville, Texas, in 2007

Lyons first began regularly covering Texas Department of Criminal Justice (TDCJ) executions at the Huntsville Unit in January 2000, although she witnessed her first execution in 1998 while filling in for a colleague. In her memoir, Death Row: The Final Minutes, Lyons writes that in the early years of covering executions, she was skilled at compartmentalizing her emotions and staying neutral during her execution coverage although on occasions, she found herself empathizing more with particular individuals.

Lyons was 22 when she began regularly covering executions and she was the prison reporter during Texas' record-breaking 40 executions in 2000, during which then-Texas Governor George W. Bush was running for president, meaning international and national media were frequently in Huntsville and she received dozens of media requests from all over the world during that time, all wanting to interview the "young woman who watched executions," as well as an influx of hate mail and angry phone calls, some threatening and accusing her of appearing "cold," in interviews because she did not take a stance on the death penalty.

Lyons became a public information officer for TDCJ in November 2001 after she was approached by PIOs Larry Fitzgerald and Larry Todd about the position. She was promoted to Director of Public Information in 2006, becoming the first female PIO Director and the youngest member of the prison's executive staff at the age of 30. In 2009, the Houston Press named her "Best Flack," writing that while "some flacks live to circle the wagons and block the free flow of public information," Lyons worked to "help reporters get to the truth and heart of a story."

She was abruptly demoted in 2012 over allegations that she kept inaccurate time sheets. She resigned entirely from the TDCJ in May 2012 after two additional false complaints were lodged at her, the last of which was 'failure to obey an order,' and filed suit, alleging sex discrimination and specifically, that she was being required to keep her time in a way that was wholly different from both her current and former male coworkers, as well as against the federal Fair Labor Standards Act. The lawsuit was dismissed on summary judgment by U.S. District Judge David Hittner in 2013, with Lyons and her lawyers Nasim Ahmad and Delana Cline filing an appeal before the Fifth Circuit Court of Appeals in New Orleans.

In September 2014, the Fifth Circuit ruled in Lyons' favor, finding that both the district court and TDCJ neglected to mention a key witness affidavit in briefs to the appellate court. TDCJ went to a settlement conference with Lyons shortly after the case was remanded back to the lower court, and the case was settled in November 2014 in Lyons' favor.

During her 2001–2012 tenure with the prison system, Michelle Lyons witnessed more than 280 executions by lethal injection, including high-profile cases such as Napoleon Beazley, Betty Lou Beets, and Shaka Sankofa (nee Gary Graham). Lyons witnessed the executions of two women.

== Later career ==
As of 2012, Lyons works in the marketing department of a global law firm.

== Bibliography ==
Lyons co-authored a memoir with her former mentor Larry Fitzgerald, titled Death Row: The Final Minutes, published in the United Kingdom by Blink Publishing in 2018. The book was released under an alternate title in the United States, and was later released in four other countries including China, Russia, the Czech Republic and Poland.

Fitzgerald died on June 12, 2017 after a long illness prior to publication.

== Personal life ==
Lyons is married. She has one child, born in 2005. Her step-daughter from a previous marriage was murdered during a robbery in California in 2016.

Lyons believes that the United States executes too many people, but supports the death penalty for the "worst of the worst". Lyons feels that the death penalty produces "no winners".
