= Andrew Lee Jones =

American murderer (1955–1991)

- Born: August 24, 1955; Lakeland, Louisiana, U.S.
- Died: July 22, 1991 (aged 35); Louisiana State Penitentiary, West Feliciana Parish, Louisiana, U.S.
- Cause of death: Execution by electrocution
- Motive: Girlfriend ended their relationship
- Convictions: First degree murder Aggravated battery Simple burglary Carrying a concealed weapon Driving while intoxicated
- Penalty: Death

Details
- Victims: Tumekica Michelle Jackson, 11
- Date: February 17, 1984
- Location: Baton Rouge, Louisiana

Andrew Lee Jones (August 24, 1955 – July 22, 1991) was an American executed for murder. He was tried, convicted, and executed in the electric chair in Louisiana for the murder of the 11-year-old daughter of his ex-girlfriend. After the girl's mother ended their relationship, Jones kidnapped the girl from her grandmother's home, then raped and strangled her.

Jones was the last inmate to be executed in Louisiana's electric chair, "Gruesome Gertie".

== Early life and prior criminal history ==
Jones was born in Lakeland, Louisiana in 1955. He was the fifth of 14 children. School records indicated that he had an IQ of 85. Jones had no juvenile arrest record.

In 1974, Jones was convicted of simple burglary and sentenced to three years of hard labor. In 1976, he was convicted of carrying a concealed weapon and sentenced to 30 days in prison. In 1977, Jones was charged with attempted second degree murder and forcible rape. The crime involved a case in which Jones kidnapped a 20-year-old black woman, brought her to a cane field, raped her, and told her to say her prayers before stabbing her and leaving her for dead. Jones pleaded guilty to a lesser charge of aggravated battery and was sentenced to 9 years in prison. His criminal history would not be mentioned at his trial, but it was mentioned in his appeals.

In 1982, Jones was convicted of driving while intoxicated and sentenced to a year of probation.

== Murder of Tumekica Jackson ==
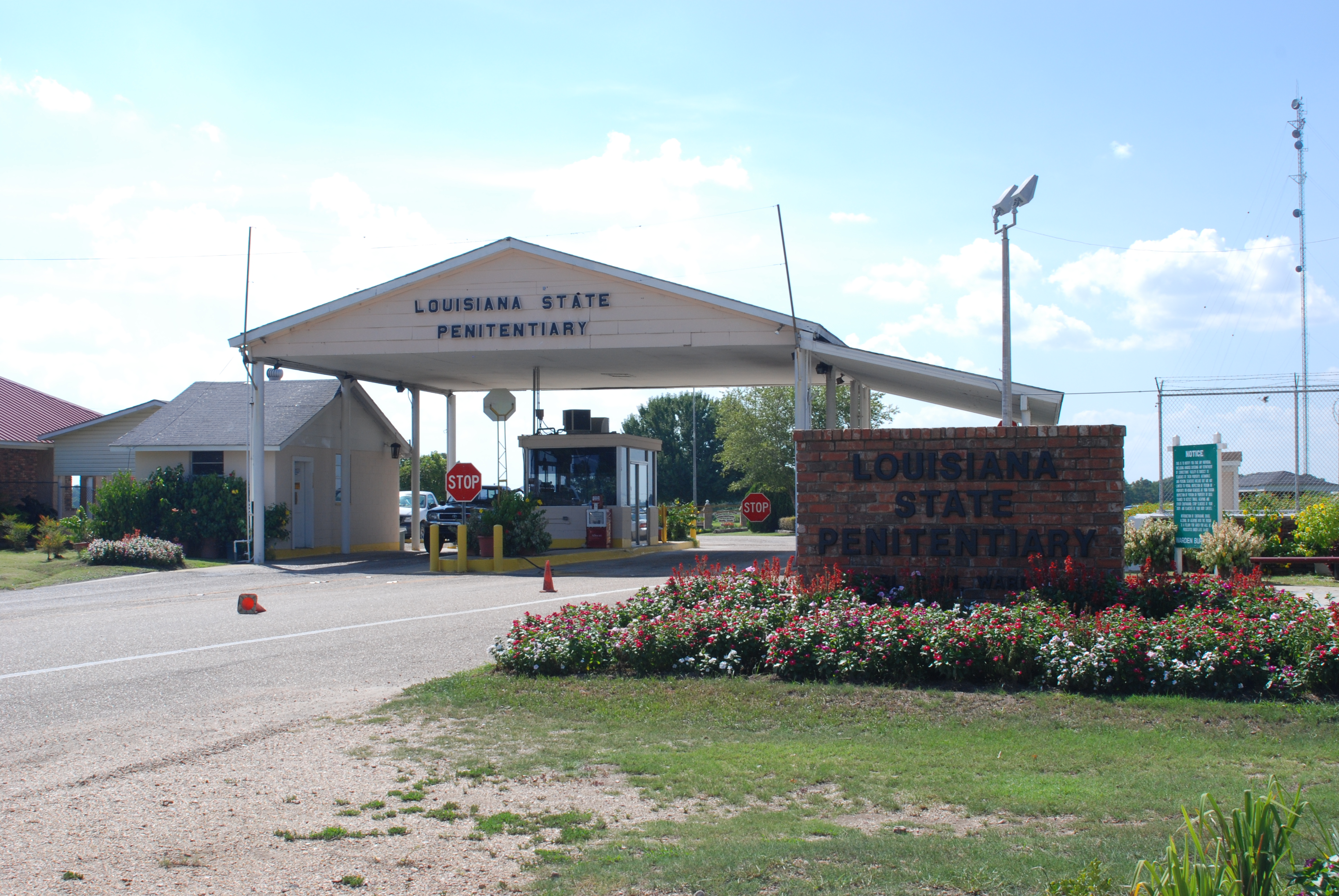
Louisiana State Penitentiary, where Jones was confined and executed

On February 17, 1984, 11-year-old Tumekica Michelle Jackson was living with her mother and her grandparents in the Scotlandville area of Baton Rouge. At 4:00 a.m., the grandmother discovered that Tumekica was missing from her bedroom. The police discovered that someone had broken the screen of the rear den window and had opened the back door. In the muddy ground near the house, police obtained a cast of an imprint made by the left shoe from a pair of size 8 1/3 tennis shoes. There were no signs of a struggle inside the house.

The investigation immediately focused on Jones because his stormy romantic relationship of several years with Tumekica's mother had been broken off by her the week before. Tumekica knew Jones well, and he had been in the home many times. On the evening of Tumekica's disappearance, Jones had called the mother's home three times and had told the grandmother that he would not be responsible for his actions if the mother continued to refuse to see him.

About 6:30 a.m., the police went to the apartment where Jones lived with his sister, Terry Jones, and his half-brother, Abraham Mingo. Jones told the police he had been home all night, and both his sister and half-brother confirmed his story.

A few hours later, Terry Jones called the police and said she may have been "mistaken" about Jones being home all night. After questioning her further, the police obtained a written consent to search the apartment about 10:00 a.m. When no one answered the officer's knock, Terry Jones used her key to open the door. Officers found Jones in the bathroom washing a pair of size 8 1/3 tennis shoes. The bath tub was full of dirt and leaves. The officers seized the tennis shoes and a pair of green gloves, and they requested that Jones give them a statement at the station. After signing a waiver, Jones gave the police a tape-recorded statement in which he denied any knowledge of the offense. He was then allowed to leave with his sister.

At approximately 6:00 p.m., the victim's partially nude body was found in a drainage canal. An autopsy established that the child had been beaten, raped, and manually strangled. The police again questioned Mingo. Although he initially told conflicting stories, he eventually gave a detailed account of his activities with Andrew Jones on Friday night and Saturday morning. According to Mingo, the three of them were together on Friday evening, but they had dropped Jones off in Scotlandville. About 12:30 a.m. on Saturday morning, Jones returned to the apartment. Donald Nixon was with Jones, but he stayed only a short time. Around 1:00 a.m., Mingo and Jones went to the Snowflake Lounge, but Jones left alone about 30 minutes later, and Mingo returned to the apartment. At some point between 4:30 and 5:00 a.m., Mingo was awakened by Jones's knock on the door, let Jones in, and went back to bed. When Mingo and Jones were alone in the apartment later that morning, Jones told him that "he shoulda stayed home", that "he did something he didn't want to do", and that he "done fucked up". Jones gave Mingo a TG&Y bag and asked him to throw it away, which he did without looking inside.

At Mingo's direction, police recovered a TG&Y bag from a dumpster near a grocery store. The bag contained socks, a pair of blue jeans, and a pink sweatshirt, which were wet, muddy, and stained. Later analysis identified the stains as a mixture of blood and seminal fluid. Mingo also told the police about a pair of boxer shorts that he had found in the bathroom of the apartment. The shorts belonged to Mingo, but Jones had worn them on Friday night. With Mingo's written consent, the police recovered a pair of stained brown and white boxer shorts from the trunk of Mingo's car. Analysis confirmed the presence of blood and seminal fluid on the boxer shorts.

On the basis of this information, police obtained a warrant and arrested Jones on Sunday. After advise and waiver of his rights, Jones gave a video-taped statement in which he asserted that he and Rudolph Springer had gone to the victim's house early Saturday morning to commit a burglary. Fearful of being recognized, Jones remained in the car while Springer entered the house. When Springer returned carrying Tumekica, Jones got in the back seat and pulled his cap over his face. After a few minutes, Springer drove Jones to his apartment at his request. That was the last time that Springer saw the victim.

== Trial ==
At trial, Mingo, Terry Jones, and Springer testified for the state. Having been granted immunity, Mingo testified about Jones's statements and his request to dispose of the TG&Y bag. Springer denied any knowledge of the crime, and he and two corroborating witnesses established his alibi for the pertinent times. Another witness, Reginald Jackson, testified that on the night of the murder, Jones asked him for a ride to Scotlandville to look for Tumekica's mother. He identified the tennis shoes, blue jeans and pink sweatshirt as the clothes worn by Jones that night.

The state also introduced the tennis shoes seized from Jones's apartment. A forensic scientist testified that these were the same size and tread design as the one which left the impression at the house where Tumekica lived, but he could not make a positive identification because of the poor quality of the soil and the resultant poor quality of the cast. But he also said that there were no dissimilarities.

A serologist established that the blood on Tumekica's underwear and pajama bottoms, as well as that on defendant's boxer shorts and the blue jeans, came from the victim. The seminal fluid found on these articles of clothing came from an individual with type-O blood, the same type as Jones.

Jones did not take the stand, and the defense presented no evidence. The jury unanimously found Jones guilty as charged of first degree murder. At the sentencing phase, the state reintroduced all evidence adduced at trial. The defense presented the testimony of Jones's mother, four of his sisters, and a cousin. The jury, found two statutory aggravating circumstances, that the murder was committed in perpetration of an aggravated rape and that the murder was especially heinous, atrocious, and cruel.

After deliberating, the jury unanimously recommended the sentence of death.

== Execution ==
On July 22, 1991, Andrew Lee Jones was executed in the electric chair at Louisiana State Penitentiary at Angola. He was the last person executed by electric chair in this state. A law making lethal injection the only method of execution had already been passed, but it didn't take effect until September 15. The Louisiana Board of Pardons had voted to recommend a stay of execution of Jones. However, Governor Buddy Roemer refused to delay the execution, citing the nature of the crime and his prior convictions.

"This man's justice day has arrived. He kidnapped, molested, beat, raped and strangled an 11-year-old child. Prior to that, he had been convicted of aggravated battery, which had been reduced from aggravated rape. He has a violent history. His day of justice has come. This man deserves what he is about to get."

Jones did not make a final statement, but at a Pardon Board hearing three days before his execution, he said he did not remember what happened because he was drunk.

"There's a possible chance I did it, a possible chance I didn't do it. If I had not been drunk, nothing like that would have happened. I'm like anybody else... I don't want to die or anything like that."

== See also ==
- Capital punishment in Louisiana
- Capital punishment in the United States
- List of people executed in Louisiana
- List of people executed in the United States in 1991

== Sources ==
- State v. Jones, 474 So.2d 919, (La 1985).
- https://web.archive.org/web/20120415072641/http://www.burkfoster.com/AnyLastWords.htm

Executions carried out in Louisiana
Preceded by Dalton Prejean May 18, 1990	Andrew Lee Jones; July 22, 1991	Succeeded by Robert Sawyer March 5, 1993
Executions carried out in the United States
Preceded by Bobby Francis – Florida June 25, 1991	Andrew Lee Jones – Louisiana; July 22, 1991	Succeeded by Albert Clozza – Virginia July 24, 1991
