= List of people executed in the United States in 1990 =

Twenty-three people, all male, were executed in the United States in 1990, twelve by lethal injection, and eleven by electrocution.

Illinois carried out its first execution since 1962, and Oklahoma executed its first person since 1966.

Dalton Prejean became the first juvenile offender to be executed after Stanford v. Kentucky, which upheld the death penalty for juvenile offenders who were at least 16 years old at the time of their crimes.

== List of people executed in the United States in 1990 ==
No.	Date of execution	Name	Age of person			Gender	Ethnicity	State	Method	Ref.
No.	Date of execution	Name	At execution	At offense	Age difference	Gender	Ethnicity	State	Method	Ref.
1	January 18, 1990	Gerald M. Smith	31	22	9	Male	White	Missouri	Lethal injection	
2	April 21, 1990	Jerome Butler	54	50	4	Male	Black	Texas	Lethal injection	
3	April 27, 1990	Ronald Raymond Woomer	35	24	11	Male	White	South Carolina	Electrocution	
4	May 4, 1990	Jesse Joseph Tafero	43	29	14	Male	White	Florida	Electrocution	
5	May 11, 1990	Winford LaVern Stokes Jr.	39	26	13	Male	Black	Missouri	Lethal injection	
6	May 17, 1990	Leonard Marvin Laws	40	31	9	Male	White	Missouri	Lethal injection	
7	May 17, 1990	Johnny Ray Anderson	30	21	9	Male	White	Texas	Lethal injection	
8	May 18, 1990	Dalton Prejean	30	17	13	Male	Black	Louisiana	Electrocution	
9	June 3, 1990	Thomas E. Baal	26	24	2	Male	White	Nevada	Lethal injection	
10	June 18, 1990	John Edward Swindler	46	32	14	Male	White	Arkansas	Electrocution	
11	June 25, 1990	Ronald Gene Simmons Sr.	49	47	2	Male	White	Arkansas	Lethal injection	
12	June 26, 1990	James Edward Smith	37	30	7	Male	Black	Texas	Lethal injection	
13	July 13, 1990	Wallace Norrell Thomas	35	21	14	Male	Black	Alabama	Electrocution	
14	July 18, 1990	Mikel James Derrick	33	23	10	Male	White	Texas	Lethal injection	
15	July 19, 1990	Richard Thomas Boggs	27	21	6	Male	White	Virginia	Electrocution	
16	July 27, 1990	Anthony Bertolotti	38	31	7	Male	Black	Florida	Electrocution	
17	August 31, 1990	George Clifton Gilmore	44	33	11	Male	White	Missouri	Lethal injection	
18	September 10, 1990	Charles Troy Coleman	43	31	12	Male	White	Oklahoma	Lethal injection	
19	September 12, 1990	Charles Thomas Walker	50	43	7	Male	White	Illinois	Lethal injection	
20	September 21, 1990	James William Hamblen	61	55	6	Male	White	Florida	Electrocution	
21	October 17, 1990	Wilbert Lee Evans	44	35	9	Male	Black	Virginia	Electrocution	
22	November 19, 1990	Raymond Robert Clark	49	36	13	Male	White	Florida	Electrocution	
23	December 13, 1990	Buddy Earl Justus	37	25	12	Male	White	Virginia	Electrocution	
		Average:	40 years	31 years	9 years					

== Demographics ==
Gender
Male	23	100%
Female	0	0%
Ethnicity
White	16	70%
Black	7	30%
State
Florida	4	17%
Missouri	4	17%
Texas	4	17%
Virginia	3	13%
Arkansas	2	9%
Alabama	1	4%
Illinois	1	4%
Louisiana	1	4%
Nevada	1	4%
Oklahoma	1	4%
South Carolina	1	4%
Method
Lethal injection	12	52%
Electrocution	11	48%
Month
January	1	4%
February	0	0%
March	0	0%
April	2	9%
May	5	22%
June	4	17%
July	4	17%
August	1	4%
September	3	13%
October	1	4%
November	1	4%
December	1	4%
Age
20–29	2	9%
30–39	10	43%
40–49	8	35%
50–59	2	9%
60–69	1	4%
Total	23	100%

== Executions in recent years ==
Number of executions
1991	14
1990	23
1989	16
Total	53

Preceded by 1989	List of people executed in the United States in 1990	Succeeded by 1991
