= Capital punishment for juveniles in the United States =

In the United States, capital punishment for juveniles existed until March 1, 2005, when the U.S. Supreme Court ruled it unconstitutional in Roper v. Simmons. Prior to Roper, there were 71 people on death row in the United States for crimes committed as juveniles. The last juvenile offender to be executed in the United States was 32-year-old Scott Hain in Oklahoma in 2003. The last female juvenile offender to be executed in the United States was Virginia Christian, who was executed in Virginia in 1912.

The death penalty for juveniles in the United States was first applied in 1642. Before the 1972 Furman v. Georgia ruling that instituted a death penalty moratorium nationwide, there were approximately 343 executions of juveniles in the United States. In the years following the 1976 Gregg v. Georgia ruling that overturned Furman and upheld the constitutionality of the death penalty, there were 22 executions of juvenile offenders before the practice was outlawed. One of the juvenile offenders had received another death sentence for a separate murder committed at age 18, but was executed specifically for the murder he committed when he was 17 since he exhausted his appeals in that case first.

Prior to Roper, states had varying minimum ages for defendants to qualify for the death penalty; 19 states did not permit the execution of juveniles, while the remaining 19 retentionist states allowed juveniles as young as 16 or 17 at the time of their crime to be executed, albeit due to lengthy appeals processes, none of them were still juveniles by the time of their executions.

== History ==
=== Pre-Furman ===
Since 1642, in the Thirteen Colonies, the United States under the Articles of Confederation, and the United States under the Constitution, an estimated 364 juveniles have been put to death by the individual states (colonies, before 1776) and the federal government. The first confirmed juvenile to be executed in the United States was Thomas Granger, executed for buggery involving several animals, including "a mare, a cow, two goats, divers sheep, two calves, and a turkey." The execution took place on September 8, 1642, when Granger was 16 or 17 years old. Prior to the execution, the animals involved in Granger's case were slaughtered in front of him.

The youngest person to have been executed in the 20th century was likely Joe Persons, a black boy executed by hanging in Georgia on September 24, 1915, for raping an 8-year-old white girl on June 14, 1915. On the gallows, Persons admitted his guilt to the nearly 50 witnesses present. His age has not been confirmed. He was variously reported to have been 12, 13, 14, 15, or "not older than 14" at the time of his execution. However, he was reportedly 13 at the time of the crime. He weighed only 65 pounds.

The youngest person executed in the United States in the 20th century who had a confirmed birth date (born October 21, 1929), was George Stinney, a 14-year-old black boy who was electrocuted in South Carolina on June 16, 1944, for the murders of two white girls (ages 7 and 11). In 2014, Stinney's conviction was posthumously vacated since he had not received a fair trial, albeit the judge who made this ruling stated that Stinney "may well have committed this crime." The verdict of this case was posthumously overturned in 2014. The third youngest was Irving Hanchett (born July 3, 1895), a 14-year old white boy who was executed by hanging in Florida on May 6, 1910, for the murder of a 13-year-old white girl, whom he stabbed 63 times after she spurned his advances.

James Arcene, a Native American, was 10 years old when he was involved in a robbery and murder in Arkansas. However, Arcene was not recaptured until 1884. He was 23 years old when he and a codefendant, who was an adult at the time of the murder, were executed by hanging on June 18, 1885.

The last person to be executed for a crime committed at the age of 14 was 15-year-old James Lewis Jr., who was executed for murder in Mississippi on July 23, 1947. The last person to be executed for a crime committed at the age of 15 was 18-year-old Irvin Mattio, who was executed for murder in Louisiana on January 9, 1948. Going forward, all executions of juvenile offenders were of those who were at least 16 years old at the time of their crimes. The last execution of a juvenile was 17-year-old Leonard Shockley, who was executed for murder in Maryland on April 10, 1959. Shockley was also the last person to be executed for a crime committed at the age of 16 in the pre-Furman era. Nobody has been under the age of 19 at the time of execution since 1964, when 19-year-old James Andrew Echols was executed in Texas for participating the gang rape of a woman when he was 17. Echols was the last juvenile offender to be executed in the United States prior to Furman v. Georgia.

The peak decade for juvenile executions was the 1940s, when approximately 58 juvenile offenders were executed in the United States. Additionally, on June 1, 1945, the United States Army executed two German youths, 16-year-old Heinz Petry and 17-year-old Josef Schöner, for espionage committed against American forces during the final stages of World War II. The two boys were part of the Werwolf, a Nazi plan for continued resistance after the occupation of Germany. Although the sentences normally would've been commuted to prison terms, the sentences were upheld in order to compel Nazi fanatics into ceasing all resistance.

=== Post-Furman ===
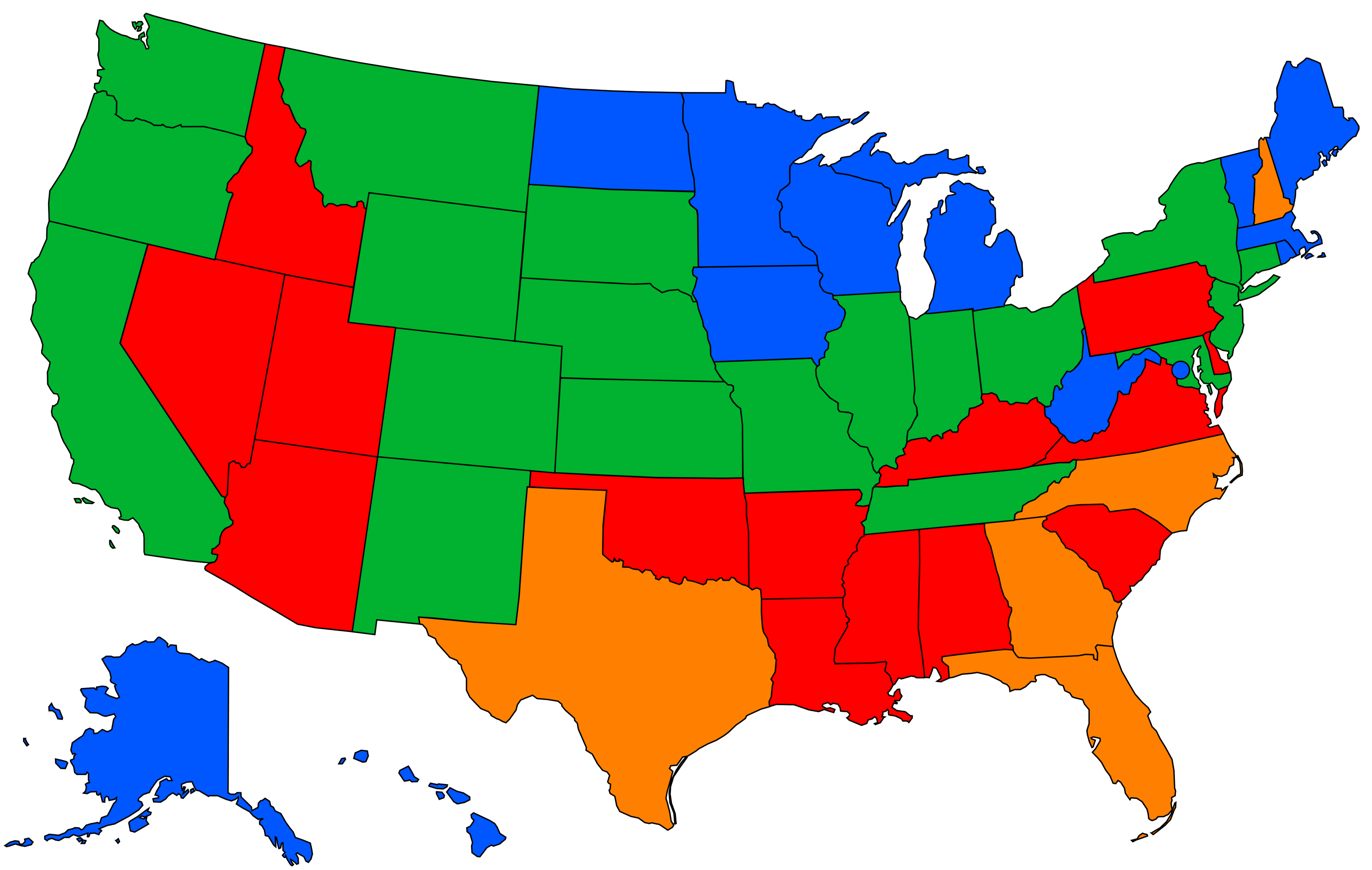
Pre-Roper minimum ages for executions by state No capital punishment Minimum age of 18 Minimum age of 17 Minimum age of 16

Since the reinstatement of the capital punishment in 1976 when the Supreme Court ruled that it did not violate the Eighth Amendment's prohibition against cruel and unusual punishment, 22 people have been executed for crimes committed while they were under the age of 18. All of the 22 executed individuals were males, and all were in states located in the South. 21 of them were age 17 when the crime occurred; one, Sean Sellers, was 16 years old when he murdered his mother, stepfather, and a store clerk. Another, Jay Kelly Pinkerton, had received another death sentence for a separate murder committed at age 18 and would not have been spared execution under Roper.

Due to the process of appeals since 1976, all 22 juvenile offenders were adults when they were executed. The youngest at the time of execution was Steve Edward Roach, who was 23. The oldest at the time of execution was Joseph John Cannon, who was 38. Jay Kelly Pinkerton was executed solely for the murder he committed at age 17 since he exhausted his appeals in that case first.

In Thompson v. Oklahoma (1988), the Supreme Court first held unconstitutional imposition of the death penalty for crime committed aged 15 or younger. But in the 1989 case Stanford v. Kentucky, it upheld capital punishment for crimes committed aged 16 or 17. Justice Scalia's plurality part of his opinion famously criticized Justice Brennan's dissent by accusing it of "replac[ing] judges of the law with a committee of philosopher-kings". Justice O'Connor was the key vote in both cases, being the lone justice to concur in the two.

Sixteen years later, Roper v. Simmons overruled Stanford. Justice Kennedy, who concurred with Scalia's opinion in Stanford, instead wrote the opinion of the court in Roper and became the key vote. Justice O'Connor dissented.

Before 2005, of the 38 U.S. states that allowed capital punishment:

- 19 states and the federal government had set a minimum age of 18,
- 5 states had set a minimum age of 17, and
- 14 states had explicitly set a minimum age of 16, or were subject to the Supreme Court's imposition of that minimum.

At the time of the Roper v. Simmons decision, there were 71 juvenile offenders were on death row: 13 in Alabama; four in Arizona; three in Florida; two in Georgia; four in Louisiana; five in Mississippi; one in Nevada; four in North Carolina; two in Pennsylvania; three in South Carolina; 29 in Texas; and one in Virginia.

A 72nd juvenile offender, Laquan T. Robinson in Delaware, had been condemned by a jury, but had his sentence hearing delayed to await the outcome of the ruling. The decision also resulted in a judge reducing the sentence of Robinson's adult accomplice, Darrell Page, to life imprisonment on the grounds that his sentence should not be harsher than Robinson's sentence. A 74th juvenile offender, serial killer Harvey Miguel Robinson, remains on death row for another murder he committed after turning 18. Four other juvenile offenders had been awaiting new trials or resentencing hearings that were delayed to await the ruling: William Arthur Kelly and Robert Lewis Conyers in South Carolina and James Davolt and Christopher Huerstel in Arizona.

Few juveniles have ever been executed for their crimes. Even when juveniles were sentenced to death, few of them were executed. In the United States, youths under the age of 18 were executed at a rate of 20–27 per decade, or about 1.6–2.3% of all executions from 1880s to the 1920s.

== List of juveniles executed in the United States since 1976 ==
Indicates cases where the executed defendant was under another sentence of death for a separate murder committed as an adult

No.	Name	Date of execution	Ethnicity	Age		Method	State	Victims
No.	Name	Date of execution	Ethnicity	At offense	At execution	Method	State	Victims
1	Charles Francis Rumbaugh	September 11, 1985	White	17	28	Lethal injection	Texas	Michael Fiorillo, 58, white
2	James Terry Roach	January 10, 1986	White	17	25	Electrocution	South Carolina	Carlotta Harris and Thomas Taylor, 14 and 17, white (Note: Also pleaded guilty to his role in the murder of Betty Swank (21, white))
3	Jay Kelly Pinkerton	May 15, 1986	White	17 (Note: Pinkerton received another death sentence for a murder committed at age 18, but was executed for the murder he committed at age 17 since he exhausted his appeals in that case first.)	24	Lethal injection	Texas	Sarah Donn Lawrence, 30, white (Note: Also murdered Sherry Welch (25, white). Pinkerton was 18 when he murdered Welch and was sentenced to death for her murder. However, he exhausted his appeals in the other case first.)
4	Dalton Prejean	May 18, 1990	Black	17	30	Electrocution	Louisiana	Donald Cleveland, 25, white (policeman) (Note: Previously convicted of murdering John Doucet (37, white) when he was 14 and served time in juvenile detention.)
5	Johnny Frank Garrett	February 11, 1992	White	17	28	Lethal injection	Texas	Tadea Benz, 76, white
6	Curtis Paul Harris	July 1, 1993	Black	17	31	Lethal injection	Texas	Timothy Michael Merka, 27, white
7	Frederick Lashley	July 28, 1993	Black	17	29	Lethal injection	Missouri	Janie Tracy, 55, black (foster mother)
8	Ruben Montoya Cantu	August 24, 1993	Hispanic	17	26	Lethal injection	Texas	Pedro Gomez, 25, Hispanic
9	Christopher Burger	December 7, 1993	White	17	33	Electrocution	Georgia	Roger Honeycutt, 25, white
10	Joseph John Cannon	April 24, 1998	White	17	38	Lethal injection	Texas	Anne Walsh, 45, white
11	Robert Anthony Carter	May 18, 1998	Black	17	34	Lethal injection	Texas	Sylvia Reyes, 17, Hispanic (Note: Also murdered R. B. Scott (63, white).)
12	Dwayne Allen Wright	October 14, 1998	Black	17	26	Lethal injection	Virginia	Saba Tekle, 34, black (Note: Also murdered Odell Thomas (31, black) Washington, D.C. and Reginald L. Turman (24, black).)
13	Sean Richard Sellers	February 4, 1999	White	16	29	Lethal injection	Oklahoma	Three people, white (Note: Robert Bower, 32, his stepfather Paul Bellofatto, 43, and his mother Vonda Bellofatto, 32.)
14	Douglas Christopher Thomas	January 10, 2000	White	17	26	Lethal injection	Virginia	James B. Wiseman and Kathy J. Wiseman, both 33, white
15	Steve Edward Roach	January 13, 2000	White	17	23	Lethal injection	Virginia	Mary Ann Hughes, 70, white
16	Glen Charles McGinnis	January 25, 2000	Black	17	27	Lethal injection	Texas	Leta Ann Wilkerson, 30, white
17	Gary Lee Graham	June 22, 2000	Black	17	36	Lethal injection	Texas	Bobby Grant Lambert, 53, white
18	Gerald Lee Mitchell	October 22, 2001	Black	17	33	Lethal injection	Texas	Charles Angelo Marino, 20, white (Note: Also murdered Hector Manguia (18, Hispanic).)
19	Napoleon Beazley	May 28, 2002	Black	17	25	Lethal injection	Texas	John E. Luttig, 63, white
20	T.J. Jones	August 8, 2002	Black	17	25	Lethal injection	Texas	Willard Lewis Davis, 75, white
21	Toronto Markkey Patterson	August 28, 2002	Black	17	24	Lethal injection	Texas	Ollie Brown, 3, black (cousin's daughter) (Note: Also murdered Brown's mother and sister, 25-year-old Kimberly Brewer and 6-year-old Jennifer Brewer.)
22	Scott Allen Hain	April 3, 2003	White	17	32	Lethal injection	Oklahoma	Michael William Houghton and Laura Lee Sanders, 27 and 22, white

== See also ==
- Capital punishment in the United States
