= James Edward Smith (murderer) =

American murderer (1952–1990)

- Born: October 19, 1952; Jefferson County, Kentucky, U.S.
- Died: June 26, 1990 (aged 37); Huntsville Unit, Texas, U.S.
- Status: Executed by lethal injection
- Conviction: Capital murder
- Penalty: Death (April 5, 1984)

Details
- Victims: 1
- Date: March 7, 1983
- Country: United States
- State: Texas

James Edward Smith (October 19, 1952 – June 26, 1990) was an American murderer who was executed for capital murder in Texas. His case garnered attention due to his odd last meal request, a plate of dirt.

== Early life ==
James Edward Smith was born on October 19, 1952, in Jefferson County, Kentucky. He worked as a tarot-card dealer in New Orleans, Louisiana, and later went to work as a taxi driver in Houston, Texas.

== Murder ==
On March 7, 1983, Smith approached a teller's window at the Union National Life Insurance Company in Houston, Texas. Armed with a gun and wearing a stocking mask, Smith slid open the glass and pointed the weapon at the teller, ordering her to hand over all the money. When she refused and hid behind a filing cabinet, Smith turned his attention to 44-year-old Larry Don Rohus, the company's district manager who had been standing with her. Rohus complied with Smith's demands and retrieved money from the cash drawer, which he then handed over to Smith in a plastic bag. As Rohus walked away, Smith ordered him to return to the window. While the two engaged in conversation, Rohus pleaded with Smith not to shoot him and began taking off a bracelet on his wrist. Smith then fired two shots, with the second hitting Rohus in the upper left side of the chest. Rohus was rushed to the hospital, where he died several hours later.

Smith fled the building on foot and was chased down by two office workers. They ran through a field and then into an apartment complex where Smith opened fire on his pursuers. As he left the complex, he tripped over in the street and was subdued by several people chasing him. A passing detective who had noticed the commotion then handcuffed him. The money was found nearby, and the gun was located in the field.

== Trial ==
Smith was charged with murdering Rohus and was held without bond. During the juror selection portion of his trial, Smith attempted to escape and ran from the courthouse. He was captured a few blocks away by a HPD officer. On April 5, 1984, Smith was found guilty of capital murder and was sentenced to death by a Harris County jury. In November 1987, his death sentence was upheld by the Texas Court of Criminal Appeals. Smith then waived his appeals in an attempt to speed up his execution.

== Execution ==
Smith was originally scheduled for execution on May 11, 1988. He was quoted as saying, "Life is a temporary situation. The spirit moves on. Death is like eating a prune in the morning. It's a natural function." The day before his scheduled execution, Smith requested a last meal of rhaeakunda dirt. The request was denied by the Texas Department of Criminal Justice because dirt was not included on the list of approved foods. They instead said he would be given something off the regular prison menu. According to Texas A&M University soil experts, the dirt was believed to be eaten in voodoo rituals, which Smith practiced and believed in. Smith had hoped to perform a voodoo ritual that he believed would assist his reincarnation.

On the morning of his scheduled execution, Smith won a reprieve after his mother's attorneys asked the Supreme Court of the United States to spare his life. The appeal filed argued that Smith was mentally incompetent. The court agreed to hear the appeal and granted the stay of execution.

Two years later, Smith was again scheduled for execution. He refused his appeals again and argued that remaining in prison was cruel and unusual punishment because he would rather die and be reincarnated. His mother appealed again and claimed he was mentally incompetent; however, the Supreme Court denied the appeal.

On June 26, 1990, Smith was executed via lethal injection in the execution chamber at the Huntsville Unit in Huntsville, Texas. He was pronounced dead at 12:31 a.m. In his final statement, he proclaimed his innocence and uttered the Krishna blessing. In the end, his last meal was just plain yogurt, which he settled for when the dirt was denied to him.

== See also ==
- List of people executed in Texas, 1990–1999
- List of people executed in the United States in 1990
