= Scott Hain =

Last juvenile offender to be executed in the United States

- Hain at a clemency hearing in March 2003
- Born: June 2, 1970; Tulsa, Oklahoma, U.S.
- Died: April 3, 2003 (aged 32); Oklahoma State Penitentiary, Oklahoma, U.S.
- Known for: Last juvenile offender to be executed in the United States
- Status: Executed by lethal injection
- Convictions: First degree murder (2 counts); Kidnapping (2 counts); Larceny of an automobile (2 counts); Third degree arson
- Penalty: Death

Details
- Victims: Michael William Houghton, 27; Laura Lee Sanders, 22
- Date: October 6, 1987
- Date apprehended: October 9, 1987

Scott Allen Hain (June 2, 1970 – April 3, 2003) was the last person executed in the United States for crimes committed as a juvenile. Hain was executed by Oklahoma for a double murder–kidnapping he committed when he was 17 years old.

== Crime ==
Hain was born in Tulsa. As a teenager, he accumulated juvenile convictions for trespassing, theft, and unauthorized use of a motor vehicle.

On October 6, 1987, Hain and Robert Lambert carjacked an automobile in Tulsa that was occupied by Michael Houghton and Laura Sanders. Hain and Lambert eventually stopped the car, robbed Houghton and Sanders, and placed them in the trunk of the car. Hain set fire to the car, which resulted in Houghton and Sanders' deaths. Hain was 17 years old at the time of the murders.

== Court proceedings and executions ==
Hain and Lambert were arrested on October 9, 1987. At trial in 1988, they were both convicted of capital felony murder and sentenced to death by lethal injection. In 1994, an appeals court determined that because the jury had not been told of the possibility of a life sentence without any chance of parole, Hain was entitled to a new sentencing hearing. At the re-sentencing hearing, the new jury again sentenced Hain to death for the murders. All of Hain's subsequent appeals were eventually dismissed, and in February 2002 the United States Supreme Court refused to hear his appeal, which was based on arguments of unconstitutionality executing juvenile offenders.

In February 2003, the U.S. Supreme Court overturned a stay of execution that had been put in place by the 10th Circuit Court of Appeals. Hain was executed by lethal injection on April 3, 2003, at the age of 32. He was the 60th person executed by Oklahoma since 1976 when the death penalty was reinstated by the United States Supreme Court. Hain's last meal consisted of three cheeseburgers, three orders of onion rings, ice cream, and a slush drink. He declined to make a final statement.

Hain's partner, Lambert, who had been convicted and sentenced in 1994, was retried, convicted and sentenced again to death. In 2005, however, Lambert's case went to the Oklahoma State Court of Criminal Appeals, where the court ruled him to be intellectually disabled. After this ruling, Lambert was resentenced to life in prison without parole.

Hain was the last person executed in the United States for crimes committed as a minor, prior to the 2005 Roper v. Simmons case in which the United States Supreme Court outlawed such executions. In March 2005, less than two years after Hain's execution, the United States Supreme Court held in the 5–4 decision of Roper v. Simmons that the Eighth Amendment to the United States Constitution was violated when offenders were executed for crimes committed prior to the age of 18.

== See also ==
- Capital punishment for juveniles in the United States
- Capital punishment in Oklahoma
- Capital punishment in the United States
- List of people executed in Oklahoma
- List of people executed in the United States in 2003
- Roper v. Simmons: 2005 U.S. Supreme Court ruling that the execution of those under 18 (at the time of committing the capital crime) is unconstitutional.
- Thompson v. Oklahoma: 1988 U.S. Supreme Court ruling that the execution of those who committed their crime when under the age of 16 is unconstitutional.
