= List of people executed in the United States in 1991 =

Fourteen people, all male, were executed in the United States in 1991, seven by lethal injection, and seven by electrocution. The execution of infamous serial killer Donald Henry Gaskins marked the nation's first execution of a White defendant for the murder of an African-American person since 1944, and it was a rare phenomenon for White people to be sentenced to death and executed for killing victims of African-American descent.

== List of people executed in the United States in 1991 ==
No.	Date of execution	Name	Age of person			Gender	Ethnicity	State	Method	Ref.
No.	Date of execution	Name	At execution	At offense	Age difference	Gender	Ethnicity	State	Method	Ref.
1	February 26, 1991	Lawrence Lee Buxton	38	28	10	Male	Black	Texas	Lethal injection	
2	April 24, 1991	Roy Allen Harich	32	23	9	Male	White	Florida	Electrocution	
3	May 23, 1991	Ignacio Cuevas	59	43	16	Male	Hispanic	Texas	Lethal injection	
4	June 17, 1991	Jerry Joe Bird	54	37	17	Male	White	Texas	Lethal injection	
5	June 25, 1991	Bobby Marion Francis	46	30	16	Male	Black	Florida	Electrocution	
6	July 22, 1991	Andrew Lee Jones	35	28	7	Male	Black	Louisiana	Electrocution	
7	July 24, 1991	Albert Jay Clozza	30	22	8	Male	White	Virginia	Electrocution	
8	August 22, 1991	Derick Lynn Peterson	30	21	9	Male	Black	Virginia	Electrocution	
9	August 23, 1991	Maurice Oscar Byrd	36	25	11	Male	Black	Missouri	Lethal injection	
10	September 6, 1991	Donald Henry Gaskins	58	49	9	Male	White	South Carolina	Electrocution	
11	September 19, 1991	James Russell	42	25	17	Male	Black	Texas	Lethal injection	
12	September 25, 1991	Warren McCleskey	46	33	13	Male	Black	Georgia	Electrocution	
13	October 18, 1991	Michael Van McDougall	36	24	12	Male	White	North Carolina	Lethal injection	
14	November 12, 1991	G.W. Green	54	39	15	Male	White	Texas	Lethal injection	
		Average:	43 years	31 years	12 years					

== Demographics ==
Gender
Male	14	100%
Female	0	0%
Ethnicity
Black	7	50%
White	6	43%
Hispanic	1	7%
State
Texas	5	36%
Florida	2	14%
Virginia	2	14%
Georgia	1	7%
Louisiana	1	7%
Missouri	1	7%
North Carolina	1	7%
South Carolina	1	7%
Method
Electrocution	7	50%
Lethal injection	7	50%
Month
January	0	0%
February	1	7%
March	0	0%
April	1	7%
May	1	7%
June	2	14%
July	2	14%
August	2	14%
September	3	21%
October	1	7%
November	1	7%
December	0	0%
Age
30–39	7	50%
40–49	3	21%
50–59	4	29%
Total	14	100%

== Executions in recent years ==
Number of executions
1992	31
1991	14
1990	23
Total	68

Preceded by 1990	List of people executed in the United States in 1991	Succeeded by 1992
