= Napoleon Beazley =

American murderer (1976–2002)

- Born: August 5, 1976; Grapeland, Texas, U.S.
- Died: May 28, 2002 (aged 25); Huntsville Unit, Texas, U.S.
- Status: Executed by lethal injection
- Conviction: Capital murder
- Penalty: Death

Napoleon Beazley (August 5, 1976 – May 28, 2002) was an American convicted murderer executed by lethal injection by the State of Texas for the murder of 63-year-old businessman John Luttig during a carjacking in 1994, when he was 17. He was one of the last juvenile offenders to be executed in the United States.

== Murder of John Luttig ==
Beazley, who was then 17, shot Luttig in the head twice in his garage on April 19, 1994, to steal his Mercedes-Benz. Beazley also shot at Luttig's wife, but missed. She survived the assault by playing dead. Beazley carried out the crime with two accomplices, Cedrick and Donald Coleman, who later testified against him. Cedrick and Donald Coleman both pleaded guilty to federal carjacking charges and were sentenced to 43.75 and 40 years in prison, respectively. They also pleaded guilty to capital murder in state court and each received life terms with parole eligibility after 40 years, to run concurrent to their federal sentences.

John Luttig was the father of United States federal judge J. Michael Luttig. During Beazley's appeals to the U.S. Supreme Court, three of the nine justices recused themselves because of their personal ties to Judge Luttig, leaving six justices to review the case. Justice Antonin Scalia recused himself because Luttig had clerked for him, while Justices David Souter and Clarence Thomas recused themselves because Luttig had been involved in their confirmations to the Supreme Court.

== Legal proceedings ==
On June 3, 1997, Beazley filed an application for writ of habeas corpus with the Texas state trial court. On September 5, 1997, the trial court held an evidentiary hearing. On October 31, 1997, the trial court entered findings of fact and conclusions of law denying habeas corpus relief. On January 21, 1998, the Texas Court of Criminal Appeals accepted the trial court's findings; they turned down relief. On October 1, 1998, Beazley filed a petition for habeas corpus in the U.S. District Court for the Eastern District of Texas, which eventually denied relief. On September 30, 1999, the Supreme Court denied further relief. On October 26, 1999, the district court turned down reconsideration. On December 28, 1999, the U.S. District Court allowed Beazley to make an appeal.

On June 1, 2000, Beazley filed his brief on appeal with the United States Court of Appeals for the Fifth Circuit. On February 9, 2001, the Fifth Circuit issued a published opinion denying habeas corpus relief. On March 15, 2001, the Fifth Circuit turned down Beazley's petition for rehearing. On March 30, 2001, Beazley's execution was set for August 15, 2001 by the District Court of Smith County, Texas. On June 13, 2001, Beazley petitioned for certiorari review from the denial of federal habeas corpus relief. On June 28, 2001, Beazley applied for a stay of execution from the Supreme Court. On August 13, 2001, the Supreme Court voted 3–3 on Beazley's request for a stay of execution. The tie vote resulted in the Fifth Circuit's decision standing, effectively rejecting Beazley's request for a stay. On August 15, 2001, the Texas Court of Criminal Appeals granted a stay of execution on the day of Beazley's scheduled execution.

On October 1, 2001, the Supreme Court turned down certiorari review. On April 17, 2002, the Texas Court of Criminal Appeals vacated the stay of execution. On April 26, 2002, Beazley's execution was set for May 28, 2002, by the District Court of Smith County, Texas. On May 7, 2002, Beazley filed a petition for clemency with the Texas Board of Pardons and Paroles. On May 13, 2002, Beazley filed a supplemental petition for clemency. On May 17, 2002, Beazley along with three others filed suit in the U.S. District Court pleading inadequate representation. That same day, U.S. District Judge Hayden Head declined to hear the lawsuit. A notice of appeal was filed. On May 21, 2002, the Fifth Circuit issued an opinion affirming the lower court's judgment, turning down injunctive relief. On May 22, 2002, Beazley petitioned for certiorari review to the Supreme Court.

== Execution ==
On May 28, 2002, the Supreme Court voted unanimously 6–0 to reject Beazley's request for a writ of habeas corpus. He was executed by lethal injection that evening. His last words were:

"The act I committed to put me here was not just heinous, it was senseless. But the person that committed that act is no longer here - I am. I'm not going to struggle physically against any restraints. I'm not going to shout, use profanity or make idle threats. Understand though that I'm not only upset, but I'm saddened by what is happening here tonight. I'm not only saddened, but disappointed that a system that is supposed to protect and uphold what is just and right can be so much like me when I made the same shameful mistake. If someone tried to dispose of everyone here for participating in this killing, I'd scream a resounding, 'No.' I'd tell them to give them all the gift that they would not give me...and that's to give them all a second chance. I'm sorry that I am here. I'm sorry that you're all here. I'm sorry that John Luttig died. And I'm sorry that it was something in me that caused all of this to happen to begin with. Tonight we tell the world that there are no second chances in the eyes of justice...Tonight, we tell our children that in some instances, in some cases, killing is right. This conflict hurts us all, there are no SIDES. The people who support this proceeding think this is justice. The people that think that I should live think that is justice. As difficult as it may seem, this is a clash of ideals, with both parties committed to what they feel is right. But who's wrong if in the end we're all victims? In my heart, I have to believe that there is a peaceful compromise to our ideals. I don't mind if there are none for me, as long as there are for those who are yet to come. There are a lot of men like me on death row - good men - who fell to the same misguided emotions, but may not have recovered as I have. Give those men a chance to do what's right. Give them a chance to undo their wrongs. A lot of them want to fix the mess they started, but don't know how. The problem is not in that people aren't willing to help them find out, but in the system telling them it won't matter anyway. No one wins tonight. No one gets closure. No one walks away victorious."

== Controversy and legacy ==
Beazley's execution sparked a fierce debate between opponents and supporters of the death penalty, particularly with respect to juvenile offenders. Some organizations, such as Amnesty International, argued in favor of clemency due to his age (at the time of the offense Beazley was 3½ months from his 18th birthday) and their opposition to the death penalty in general. Beazley was one of the last juvenile offenders to be executed in the United States.

In 2005, the Supreme Court (in Roper v. Simmons) banned the practice of executing offenders who were under the age of 18 when they committed their crimes.

== See also ==
- List of people executed in Texas, 2000–2009
- List of people executed in the United States in 2002
- Roper v. Simmons: 2005 U.S. Supreme Court ruling that the execution of those under 18 (at the time of committing the capital crime) is unconstitutional.
- Thompson v. Oklahoma: 1988 U.S. Supreme Court ruling that the execution of those who committed their crime when under the age of 16 is unconstitutional.
