= 1974 Huntsville Prison siege =

Prison riot in Huntsville, Texas

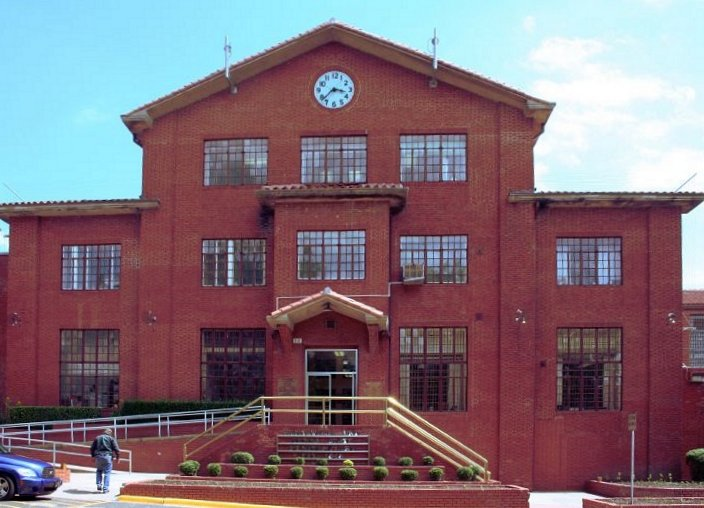
The Huntsville Unit, the location of the siege

The 1974 Huntsville Prison siege was an eleven-day prison uprising that took place from July 24 to August 3, 1974, at the Huntsville Walls Unit of the Texas Department of Corrections in Huntsville, Texas. The standoff was one of the longest hostage-taking sieges in United States history.

The siege occurred during a broader period of unrest in United States prisons during the 1970s, when concerns over inmate rights, overcrowding, and prison conditions contributed to a rise in violent incidents. Notable events such as the Attica Prison riot uprising drew national attention to correctional institutions and prompted increased public scrutiny of prison management practices. Similar disturbances were reported at facilities including Louisiana State Penitentiary, where inmates protested living conditions. These developments contributed to ongoing debates over prison reform and institutional oversight during the decade and many following decades to come.

== Siege ==
From July 24 to August 3, 1974, Federico "Fred" Gomez Carrasco and two other inmates laid siege to the education/library building of the Walls Unit. Fred Carrasco was a powerful heroin kingpin in South Texas who was serving a life sentence for the attempted murder of a police officer. He was also suspected in the murder of dozens of people in Mexico and Texas. Having smuggled pistols and ammunition into the prison, he and two other convicts took eleven prison workers and four inmates hostage. The pistols were smuggled by a bribed prison worker who put three .357 magnum pistols in a can of ham. More than 300 rounds of ammunition were also smuggled inside cans of peaches.

When the one o'clock work bell sounded, Carrasco walked up a ramp to the third-story library and forced several prisoners out at gunpoint. When two guards tried to go up the ramp, Carrasco fired at them. His two accomplices, who were also armed, immediately joined him in the library.

The prison warden and the director of the Texas Department of Corrections immediately began negotiations with the convicts. FBI agents and Texas Rangers arrived to assist them, as the media descended on Huntsville. Over the next several days the convicts made a number of demands, including tailored suits, dress shoes, toothpaste, cologne, walkie-talkies and bulletproof helmets, all of which were provided promptly. With the approval of Texas Governor Dolph Briscoe, an armored getaway car was provided and rolled into the prison courtyard. Carrasco claimed that they were planning to flee to Cuba and appeal to Fidel Castro.

After a grueling eleven-day standoff, the convicts finally made their escape attempt just before 10 p.m. on Saturday, August 3, 1974. They moved out of the library toward the waiting vehicle in a makeshift shield consisting of legal books taped to mobile blackboards that were later dubbed by the press the "Trojan Taco". Inside the shield were the three convicts and four hostages, while eight other hostages ringed the exterior of the "taco".

Acting on a prearranged plan, prison guards and Texas Rangers blasted the group with fire hoses. However, a rupture in the hose gave the convicts time to fatally shoot the two female hostages who had volunteered to join the convicts in the armored car. When prison officials returned fire, Carrasco and one of his two accomplices, Rodolpho Dominguez, were killed. Syndicated columnist Cal Thomas, who was an onsite reporter for Houston's KPRC-TV at the time, later wrote, "It is a tragedy that two hostages died. It is a miracle all the rest lived."

The two female hostages who were killed during the incident were Yvonne Beseda and Julia Standley. In 1999 on the 25th anniversary of the siege, the Huntsville Unit Education Building where the siege occurred was renamed The Standley-Beseda Education Building with a renaming ceremony attended by members of the siege and families. The renaming was due to the efforts of the Huntsville Unit School principal, Dr. Gregory Gathright and the Unit Warden Jim Willett. The renaming process necessitated a resolution by the Texas Legislature required for any name change to a state-owned facility. The vote was unanimous for approval.

== Aftermath ==
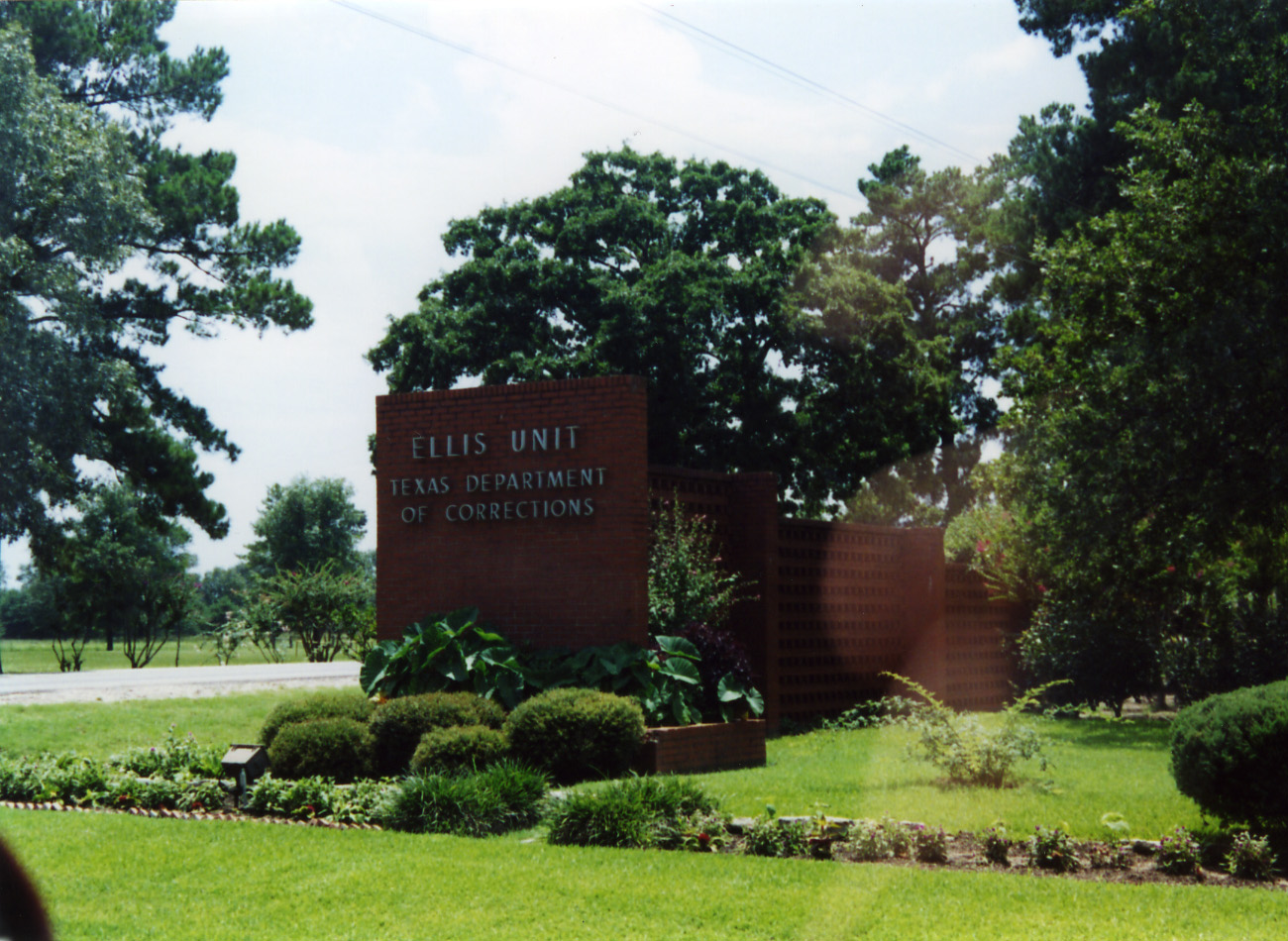
Cuevas was held at the Ellis Unit while on death row

Ignacio Cuevas (July 31, 1931 – May 23, 1991), the surviving perpetrator, was convicted of capital murder in the death of Julia Standley. He was sentenced to death on May 30, 1975. Cuevas was held at the Ellis Unit, and he was executed on May 23, 1991. Cuevas's last meal request consisted of chicken dumplings, steamed rice, sliced bread, black-eyed peas, and iced tea. Cuevas's last words were "I'm going to a beautiful place. O.K., warden, roll 'em."

== Cultural references ==
Tex-Mex musician Joe "King" Carrasco (born Joe Teusch) adopted the drug king's surname.

"When I was playing with the Mexican bands, they couldn't say Teusch," he says. "That was when Fred Carrasco had tried to break out of Huntsville back in 1974 with a big shootout. Carrasco was killed, so that week the Mexican guys said, "We're going to call you Carrasco."

Los Socios de San Antonio have a tribute song entitled "La Muerte de Fred Gomez Carrasco".

The Riot and the "Trojan Taco" was also mentioned in the episode "The Reverse Midas Touch" during the 5th season of Orange Is the New Black, in a news segment in which a historian unfolds several prison riots and the fatal consequence prisoners typically face afterwards.

An upcoming film about the siege, Eleven Days, filmed in September 2025 in Huntsville. It is directed by Peter Landesman, based on the 2004 book Eleven Days in Hell: The 1974 Carrasco Prison Siege at Huntsville, Texas by William T. Harper, and stars Taylor Kitsch, Diego Luna, and Jason Isaacs.

== See also ==
- Capital punishment in Texas
- Capital punishment in the United States
- List of people executed in Texas, 1990–1999
- List of people executed in the United States in 1991
