= James Arcene =

Native American executed in 1885

- Born: c. 1862; Cherokee Nation
- Died: June 18, 1885 (aged 23); Fort Smith, Arkansas, U.S.
- Known for: Youngest person sentenced to death in the United States
- Status: Executed by hanging
- Conviction: First degree murder
- Penalty: Death
- Escaped: 1872–1884

James Arcene (c. 1862 – June 18, 1885) was a Cherokee Nation member and the youngest person sentenced to death in the United States. Arcene was hanged by the U.S. federal government in Fort Smith, Arkansas, for his role in a robbery and murder committed thirteen years earlier, when he was about 10 years old.

The state alleged that Arcene and a Cherokee man named William Parchmeal noticed William Feigel, a Swedish national, making a purchase in a store. They followed Feigel when he left, heading for Fort Gibson, and caught up with him about two miles outside of the fort. The state claimed that, with robbery as a motive, one of the two shot Feigel six times before crushing his skull with a rock, and that Arcene and Parchmeal then took a pair of boots and some money off of Feigel's corpse. Arcene was arrested, but escaped and eluded capture until he was apprehended in 1884. During this time, Parchmeal, who was a suspect, but was initially not charged, enlisted as a private in Company C of the Second Indian Home Guard, Kansas Infantry.

Arcene was tried, convicted, and sentenced to death for the murder of Feigel. He was executed at the age of 23 in 1885. Arcene and Parchmeal were apprehended by Deputy Marshal Andrews. "Hanging Judge" Isaac C. Parker presided over the executions, which were held at Fort Smith.

Arcene claimed that he had committed the killing under duress. Arcene stated that day he was living in a house in Tahlequah, Cherokee Nation, with other Cherokees playing cards. Parchmeal came to the residence and asked Arcene to walk with him. He stated that he and Parchmeal were walking through a prairie and into the road when Parchmeal saw a man, William Feigel, and said to Arcene, "That is the man; shoot him," after which Arcene shot Feigel. Parchmeal then dragged Feigel's body out of the road and took his boots and the 25 cents in his pocket. Arcene said that he did not know why Parchmeal wanted Feigel dead, and did not know it was wrong due to his age. While Parchmeal originally blamed Arcene, he accepted full guilt shortly before his execution, and stated through an interpreter that he was "ready to die". Both Arcene and Parchmeal were hanged on June 26, 1885.

Arcene's case is frequently brought up in discussions of the death penalty for children, and to a lesser degree in discussions of the unfair treatment Native Americans received from the United States government.

== See also ==
- Capital punishment for juveniles in the United States
