= Stanford v. Kentucky =

- Supreme Court of the United States

Argued March 7, 1989 Decided June 26, 1989
- Full case name: Kevin Stanford v. State of Kentucky (No. 87-5765); together with Heath Wilkins v. State of Missouri (No. 87-6026)
- Citations: 492 U.S. 361 (more) 109 S. Ct. 2969; 106 L. Ed. 2d 306; 1989 U.S. LEXIS 3195

Case history
- Prior: Stanford v. Commonwealth, 734 S.W.2d 781 (Ky. 1987); cert. granted, 488 U.S. 887 (1988); State v. Wilkins, 736 S.W.2d 409 (Mo. 1987); cert. granted, 487 U.S. 1233 (1988).

Holding
- The judgments are affirmed. The imposition of capital punishment on an individual for a crime committed at 16 or 17 years of age does not constitute cruel and unusual punishment under the Eighth Amendment.

Court membership
- Chief Justice William Rehnquist Associate Justices William J. Brennan Jr. · Byron White; Thurgood Marshall · Harry Blackmun; John P. Stevens · Sandra Day O'Connor; Antonin Scalia · Anthony Kennedy

Case opinions
- Majority: Scalia, joined by Rehnquist, White, O'Connor, Kennedy (parts I, II, III, and IV-A)
- Plurality: Scalia, joined by Rehnquist, White, Kennedy (parts IV-B and V)
- Concurrence: O'Connor (in part and in judgment)
- Dissent: Brennan, joined by Marshall, Blackmun, Stevens

Laws applied
- U.S. Const. amends. VIII, XIV
- Overruled by
- Roper v. Simmons, 543 U.S. 551 (2005)

Stanford v. Kentucky, 492 U.S. 361 (1989), was a United States Supreme Court case that sanctioned the imposition of the death penalty on offenders who were at least 16 years of age at the time of the crime. This decision came one year after Thompson v. Oklahoma, in which the Court had held that a 15-year-old offender could not be executed because to do so would constitute cruel and unusual punishment.

== Background ==
The case involved the shooting death of 20-year-old Barbel Poore in Jefferson County, Kentucky. Kevin Stanford committed the murder on January 7, 1981, when he was approximately 17 years and 4 months of age. Stanford and his accomplice repeatedly raped and sodomized Poore during and after their commission of a robbery at a gas station where she worked as an attendant. They then drove her to a secluded area near the station, where Stanford shot her point blank in the face and then in the back of her head. The proceeds from the robbery were roughly 300 cartons of cigarettes, two gallons of fuel, and a small amount of cash.

After Stanford's arrest, a Kentucky juvenile court conducted hearings to determine whether he should be transferred for trial as an adult, and, stressing the seriousness of his offenses and his long history of past delinquency, found that certification for trial as an adult to be in the best interest of Stanford and the community.

Stanford was convicted of murder, first-degree sodomy, first-degree robbery, and receiving stolen property, and was sentenced to death and 45 years in prison. The Kentucky Supreme Court affirmed the death sentence, rejecting Stanford's "deman[d] that he has a constitutional right to treatment". Finding that the record clearly demonstrated that "there was no program or treatment appropriate for the appellant in the juvenile justice system", the court held that the juvenile court did not err in certifying Stanford for trial as an adult. The court also stated that Stanford's "age and the possibility that he might be rehabilitated were mitigating factors appropriately left to the consideration of the jury that tried him".

== Oral arguments ==
Oral arguments were heard 27 March 1989. Prior to the hearing, briefs of amici curiae pushing for reversal were filed by the American Baptist Churches, the Child Welfare League of America, and the West Virginia Council of Churches. Briefs supporting the affirmation of the capital sentence were filed by the Attorney General of Kentucky and a number of attorneys general from other states.

In both cases, briefs of amici curiae were put forth by the American Bar Association, the American Society for Adolescent Psychiatry, the International Human Rights Group, and Amnesty International.

Arguments in the defense of petitioners Stanford and Wilkins (see below) were that the application of capital punishment upon defendants who were minors at the time of the offense was unconstitutional because it violated the prohibition of "cruel and unusual punishment" under the Eighth Amendment to the United States Constitution.

== Opinion ==
In both Stanford v. Kentucky, and the parallel case Wilkins v. Missouri, the Supreme Court affirmed the capital punishments handed down in lower courts. Writing for the majority, Justice Antonin Scalia wrote that neither Stanford or Wilkins asserted that the punishment was cruel or unusual at the time the Bill of Rights was adopted (common law at the time set the incapacity to commit a felony at age 14), and so both petitioners were left to argue that capital punishment for minors older than 14, was contrary to "the evolving standards of decency". This expanse in the review of the Eighth Amendment was not granted in this decision, and Scalia went on to cite precedent limits set in Gregg v. Georgia (1976).

We discern neither a historical nor a modern societal consensus forbidding the imposition of capital punishment on any person who murders at 16 or 17 years of age. Accordingly, we conclude that such punishment does not offend the Eighth Amendment's prohibition against cruel and unusual punishment. ... and to mean that as the dissent means it, i.e., that it is for us to judge, not on the basis of what we perceive the Eighth Amendment originally prohibited, or on the basis of what we perceive the society through its democratic processes now overwhelmingly disapproves, but on the basis of what we think "proportionate" and "measurably contributory to acceptable goals of punishment" – to say and mean that, is to replace judges of the law with a committee of philosopher-kings.

Justice Sandra Day O'Connor, although agreeing that no national consensus forbade the imposition of capital punishment on 16- or 17-year-old murderers, concluded that the court has a constitutional obligation to conduct proportionality analysis, (citing Penry v. Lynaugh) and should consider age-based statutory classifications that are relevant to that analysis. Justice Brennan filed a dissenting opinion, in which he was joined by Justices Marshall, Blackmun, and Stevens.

== Aftermath ==
In the aftermath of the ruling, 19 juvenile offenders were executed in the United States. The first was Dalton Prejean in 1990 and the last was Scott Hain in 2003. Ironically, Stanford himself was not amongst those executed. After Stanford exhausted his appeals, Governor Paul E. Patton refused to sign his death warrant. In 2003, Patton commuted Stanford's sentence to life in prison. Two years later, the U.S. Supreme Court held in Roper v. Simmons that all juvenile offenders are exempt from the death penalty, thus overruling Stanford. As of 2025, Stanford is still serving a life sentence without the possibility of parole.

== See also ==
- Capital punishment for juveniles in the United States
- List of United States Supreme Court cases, volume 492
- List of United States Supreme Court cases
- Lists of United States Supreme Court cases by volume
- List of United States Supreme Court cases by the Rehnquist Court
