= Murder of Patricia Bolton =

1983 rape and murder of a young girl in Virginia

Patricia Bolton
- Born: September 22, 1969; New York, U.S.
- Died: January 13, 1983 (aged 13); Virginia Beach, Virginia, U.S.
- Resting place: Woodlawn Memorial Gardens
- Other name: Patty
- Education: Princess Anne Junior High School
- Known for: Victim of a kidnapping, rape, and murder case

On January 13, 1983, in Virginia Beach, Virginia, 13-year-old Patricia Beth "Patty" Bolton (born September 22, 1969) was abducted, raped and murdered by 22-year-old Albert Jay Clozza (September 7, 1960 – July 24, 1991), a maintenance worker who worked at the trailer park where Bolton and her family resided. Clozza was arrested the following day and subsequently charged with kidnapping, raping and murdering Bolton. Clozza was found guilty of capital murder and several other charges, and sentenced to death and executed by the electric chair on July 24, 1991.

== Abduction and murder ==
On the evening of January 13, 1983, a 13-year-old girl was abducted, raped and murdered in Virginia Beach, Virginia.

On that evening itself, 13-year-old Patricia Beth Bolton disappeared while she was walking back to her trailer park home from a bookmobile in her neighbourhood. Bolton did not return home on that night, which prompted her father to file a missing persons report. He also searched around the neighbourhood for his daughter, but to no avail. The following day, the authorities conducted a search, and approximately 150 people, most of whom were military personnel, took part in the search. Later that afternoon, Bolton's body was discovered lying face down in a wooded area, with extensive bruises and facial injuries, as well as bruises to her vaginal area. Bolton's clothes and books were earlier found in another location at a nearby field.

An autopsy report showed that Bolton was being sexually assaulted by her attacker, and she sustained several blows to her face, which caused her jaw to be broken. The medical examiner confirmed that Bolton died as a result of inhaling her own blood from the facial wounds. A few hours after the discovery of Bolton's corpse, a 22-year-old trailer park maintenance worker named Albert Jay Clozza was arrested for the murder of Bolton, after a search around the crime scene led to the discovery of Clozza's notebook and empty pack of cigarettes, and a convenience store clerk also told police that she saw Clozza the night before with swollen hands and blood on his face and clothes.

After his arrest, Clozza confessed to the murder and rape of Bolton. He admitted that on the evening when Bolton supposedly went missing, he had kidnapped Bolton on her way back home, and subsequently dragged the girl to a nearby field, where he raped and sodomized Bolton several times. He also admitted to violently assaulting Bolton in the face, and this led to the severe facial injuries and Bolton's death from inhaling her own blood.

A grand jury formally indicted Clozza for capital murder in July 1983, and Commonwealth's Attorney Paul Sciortino expressed his intent to seek the death penalty.

== Trial of Albert Clozza ==
Albert Clozza

On November 3, 1983, a Virginia Beach Circuit Court jury found Albert Clozza guilty of capital murder, aggravated sexual battery, forcible sodomy, abduction with intent to defile and sexual penetration with an inanimate object. On that same day, the jury recommended 20 years' jail for the charge of aggravated sexual battery, as well as life imprisonment for the other sexual offenses and kidnapping, but the jury deferred their sentencing for the charge of capital murder to the next day.

On November 4, 1983, the jury returned with their verdict on the sentence for Clozza's capital murder offense and unanimously voted for the death penalty. This recommendation, however, was non-binding, and the trial judge had the discretion to either follow or reject the jury's stance.

On November 22, 1983, Circuit Court Judge George W. Vakos formally sentenced Clozza to death by electrocution. Vakos quoted in his judgement that he deliberated for the past two weeks to search in his heart for some mercy for Clozza, but could only see the mutilated body of Patricia Bolton, and hence he decided that Clozza was not entitled to more mercy than what he showed to his victim, and opted for the death penalty.

Apart from the death sentence, Clozza was handed a 20-year jail term for aggravated sexual battery, and four additional life sentences for two counts of forcible sodomy, one count of abduction with intent to defile and one count of sexual penetration with an inanimate object.

== Clozza's appeals ==
On September 7, 1984, the Virginia Supreme Court dismissed Albert Clozza's direct appeal against his death sentence.

On February 19, 1985, Clozza's appeal was denied by the U.S. Supreme Court.

On November 3, 1987, the U.S. Supreme Court rejected Clozza's second appeal and ruled that he received a fair trial and that his death sentence was properly imposed.

As of January 1989, Clozza was one of 16 condemned inmates from Virginia who filed federal appeals against their respective death sentences.

On September 13, 1990, the 4th U.S. Circuit Court of Appeals rejected Clozza's appeal.

By June 1991, Clozza lost his final appeal to the U.S. Supreme Court, which confirmed his death sentence for the murder of Patricia Bolton.

== Execution of Clozza ==
On June 3, 1991, a death warrant was signed for Albert Clozza, and his death sentence was scheduled to be carried out on July 24, 1991.

During the final weeks leading up to his execution, Clozza did not file any last-minute appeals to delay his execution. Governor Douglas Wilder also refused to halt the upcoming execution of Clozza in spite of appeals for mercy from death penalty opponents. A prison psychologist noted that in the face of his imminent fate, Clozza was "coping with his situation quite well".

On July 24, 1991, after spending 8 1/2 years on death row, 31-year-old Albert Jay Clozza was put to death by the electric chair at the Greensville Correctional Center. Jean Clarke, the prison's operations officer, confirmed in a media statement that Clozza's death sentence was carried out and he was pronounced dead at 11:07pm. Clozza's execution was the first execution held at the Greensville Correctional Center, after the closure of the Virginia State Penitentiary. Clozza's execution was the 12th execution after the Commonwealth of Virginia resumed executions in 1982, as well as the 150th in the United States after the nation's resumption of capital punishment in 1976.

In his last statement, Clozza expressed remorse for his actions, stating that he was unable to change what he had done and he did not expect forgiveness for his actions. Prior to his execution, Clozza did not request for a special last meal, but he accepted a dinner of chili, rice, peas, pasta salad and chocolate cake.

It was reported that Phil Hamilton, a state politician, also came to witness the execution of Clozza. Prior to this, Hampton had proposed a bill to abolish the electric chair in Virginia and implement lethal injection to replace the electric chair, on the basis that it could cause a torturous and more painful death. The bill, however, was not passed. Hampton later told The Virginian-Pilot that he was satisfied with the electrocution process but was undecided about the need to change the execution methods, but he affirmed his strong support for capital punishment. Outside the prison, more than 30 anti-death penalty advocates conducted a protest to oppose the execution of Clozza, and the group included members of Amnesty International, an international human rights group that opposed the death penalty.

== See also ==
- Capital punishment in Virginia
- List of people executed in Virginia
- List of people executed in the United States in 1991
