= Roper v. Simmons =

2005 U.S. Supreme Court case on capital punishment

- Supreme Court of the United States

Argued October 13, 2004 Decided March 1, 2005
- Full case name: Donald P. Roper, Superintendent, Potosi Correctional Center, Petitioner v. Christopher Simmons
- Docket no.: 03-633
- Citations: 543 U.S. 551 (more) 125 S. Ct. 1183; 161 L. Ed. 2d 1; 2005 U.S. LEXIS 2200; 73 U.S.L.W. 4153; 18 Fla. L. Weekly Fed. S 131
- Argument: Oral argument

Case history
- Prior: Defendant convicted, motion for postconviction relief denied, Circuit Court of Jefferson County, Missouri; affirmed, State v. Simmons, 944 S.W.2d 165 (Mo. 1997) (en banc), cert. denied, 522 U.S. 953 (1997). Denial of petition for a writ of habeas corpus affirmed, Simmons v. Bowersox, 235 F.3d 1124 (8th Cir. 2001), cert. denied, 534 U.S. 924 (2001). Petition for a writ of habeas corpus granted, State ex rel. Simmons v. Roper, 112 S.W.3d 397 (Mo. 2003) (en banc), cert. granted, 540 U.S. 1160 (2004).

Holding
- The Eighth and Fourteenth Amendments forbid imposition of the death penalty on offenders who were under the age of 18 when their crimes were committed.

Court membership
- Chief Justice William Rehnquist Associate Justices John P. Stevens · Sandra Day O'Connor; Antonin Scalia · Anthony Kennedy; David Souter · Clarence Thomas; Ruth Bader Ginsburg · Stephen Breyer

Case opinions
- Majority: Kennedy, joined by Stevens, Souter, Ginsburg, Breyer
- Concurrence: Stevens, joined by Ginsburg
- Dissent: Scalia, joined by Rehnquist, Thomas
- Dissent: O'Connor

Laws applied
- U.S. Const. amends. VIII, XIV
- This case overturned a previous ruling or rulings
- Stanford v. Kentucky (1989)

Roper v. Simmons, 543 U.S. 551 (2005), is a landmark decision by the Supreme Court of the United States in which the Court held that it is unconstitutional to impose capital punishment for crimes committed while under the age of 18. The 5–4 decision overruled Stanford v. Kentucky, in which the court had upheld execution of offenders at or above age 16. Roper overturned statutes in 19 states.

== Background ==
In a line of cases reaching back to Weems v. United States (1910) the Supreme Court has elaborated that the Eighth Amendment protects the dignity of all persons, "even those convicted of heinous crimes". Excessive and disproportionate punishments are prohibited as cruel and unusual punishment by the Court's precedent. The Court has applied an "evolving standards of decency" test to decide which punishments are unconstitutionally excessive.

The Court has limited the death penalty to offenders who commit the "most serious crimes" and who are "the most deserving of execution" based on their culpability and blameworthiness. The Supreme Court has restricted death sentences by crime (see Coker v. Georgia and Enmund v. Florida) and class of offender (see Thompson v. Oklahoma, Ford v. Wainwright and Atkins v. Virginia).

When the Court upheld the constitutionality of the death penalty in the 1976 case Gregg v. Georgia that decision was justified by retributive and deterrent purposes of state death penalty statutes. When Atkins was decided in 2002 the Court, quoting from Coker v. Georgia, brought its own judgment "to bear on the question of the acceptability of the death penalty under the Eighth Amendment" and decided that diminished personal capacity makes the death penalty an excessive punishment for the intellectually disabled because the public purposes of retribution and deterrence are not served by executing the mentally impaired.

In 1987, the Inter-American Commission of Human Rights of the Organization of American States found in Roach and Pinkerton v. United States that the United States is violating their human rights under Article I, VII, XXVI of the American Declaration of the Rights and Duties of Man by executing them for crimes committed under the age of 18.

In 1988, a plurality barred execution of offenders under the age of 16 in Thompson v. Oklahoma. The following year Stanford v. Kentucky, upheld the possibility of capital punishment for offenders who were 16 or 17 years old when they committed the capital offense. The court found there was no national consensus that the execution of older adolescents was cruel and unusual under "evolving standards of decency" because the sentence was still permitted by a majority of death penalty jurisdictions. Justice Sandra Day O'Connor, concurring in the Stanford judgment, was critical of the plurality's refusal "to judge whether the nexus between the punishment imposed and the defendant's blameworthiness is proportional."

In the Roper decision, Justice Kennedy, writing for the majority, said the Stanford plurality had failed “to bring its independent judgment to bear on the proportionality of the death penalty for a particular class of...offenders". Finding that "penological justifications for the death penalty apply to [juveniles] with lesser force than to adults", The Court reversed Stanford.

== Case history ==
In the state of Missouri in 1993, 17-year-old Christopher Simmons concocted a plan to commit burglary and murder, having previously told friends that he "wanted to kill someone" and that he believed he could "get away with it" because he was a juvenile. Simmons convinced two of his friends to join him: 15-year-old Charles Benjamin and 16-year-old John Tessmer. On September 9, Simmons met with Benjamin and Tessmer at 2 a.m. to carry out their plan, but Tessmer decided to leave before any crimes were committed. (Note: Simmons, Benjamin, and Tessmer met near the trailer of an older neighbor, a 29-year-old ex-convict named Brian Moomey, to discuss their plan. Simmons and his friends frequently visited Moomey's trailer in the months preceding the murder, where Moomey would let them drink alcohol and take drugs. Moomey would later be a key witness at trial.) Simmons and Benjamin later broke into the home of Shirley Crook, a 46-year-old neighbor, where they duct-taped her mouth and eyes shut before abducting her in her van. Simmons drove Crook's van to Castlewood State Park and parked near a railroad trestle bridge, where Simmons and Benjamin unloaded Crook from the van. They then covered her head with a towel, wrapped her in electrical wire, and threw her off of the trestle bridge into the Meramec River while she was still alive and conscious. (Note: Benjamin stated in a 2002 interview that he waited in the car while Simmons threw Crook off of the bridge and that he did not know what happened to Crook until the following morning. However, prosecutors stated that it would have taken both Simmons and Benjamin to carry Crook's body to the bridge.) Crook's body was discovered that afternoon by a group of fishermen. (Note: Shirley Crook was reported as a missing person earlier that afternoon by her husband Steven Crook, who was away from home on an overnight trip on the night of the murder.)

Simmons was heard "bragging about the murder" later that day and told his friends that he had killed a woman. The day after the murder, police arrested Simmons and Benjamin at their high school after receiving a tip that they were involved in the murder. At the police station in Fenton, Missouri, Simmons waived his right to attorney and agreed to answer questions. Simmons initially denied involvement but later confessed to the murder and agreed to perform a videotaped reenactment at the crime scene. Simmons further told detectives that he recognized Crook as someone he had been in a minor traffic accident with several months earlier and that he believed Crook recognized him as well.

Simmons was charged with first degree murder, burglary, kidnapping, and stealing. He was tried as an adult. At trial, Tessmer testified that Simmons planned the murder in advance. (Note: Tessmer was charged with criminal conspiracy for his role in the murder, but the charges were dropped in exchange for his testimony against Simmons.) The jury found Simmons guilty of Crook's murder and recommended the death penalty, which the trial court imposed. For his role, Benjamin was sentenced to life without parole.

=== Lower court proceedings ===
Simmons moved for the trial court to set aside the conviction and sentence, citing, in part, ineffective assistance of counsel. His age, and thus impulsiveness, along with a troubled background, were brought up as issues that Simmons claimed should have been raised at the sentencing phase. The trial court rejected the motion, and Simmons appealed.

The case worked its way up the court system, with the courts continuing to uphold the death sentence. Simmons had an execution date scheduled for May 1, 2002. However, in light of a 2002 U.S. Supreme Court ruling, in Atkins v. Virginia, that overturned the death penalty for the intellectually disabled, Simmons filed a new petition for state post-conviction relief. The Supreme Court of Missouri concluded that "a national consensus has developed against the execution of juvenile offenders" and held that such punishment now violates the Eighth Amendment's prohibition of cruel and unusual punishment. They reduced the death sentences of Simmons and Antonio Richardson, who was 16 when he participated in the murders of Julie and Robin Kerry, to life imprisonment without parole.

The State of Missouri appealed the decision to the U.S. Supreme Court, which agreed to hear the case.

== Supreme Court ==
The Supreme Court reversed Stanford and held that the Eighth Amendment does not allow death sentences for juvenile offenders younger than 18.

=== Opinion of the Court ===
Under the "evolving standards of decency" test, the Court held that it was cruel and unusual punishment to execute a person who was under the age of 18 when the crime was committed.

The Court found a "national consensus" based on state laws and jury sentencing behavior. At the time of the decision, 20 states had the juvenile death penalty on the books, but only six states had executed prisoners since 1989 for crimes committed as juveniles. Only three states had done so since 1994: Oklahoma, Texas, and Virginia. Furthermore, five of the states that allowed the juvenile death penalty when Stanford was decided in 1989 had since abolished it.

Writing for the majority, Justice Kennedy identified three indications of a national consensus against the juvenile death penalty: its rejection by most states, its infrequent use where it remained authorized, and the continuing trend toward abolition. He concluded that juveniles were categorically less culpable than the average criminal.

Drawing on scientific and developmental research submitted by amici curiae, Justice Kennedy identified three reasons juveniles are less culpable than adults: their immaturity and underdeveloped sense of responsibility, their greater vulnerability to negative influences and outside pressures, and their greater capacity for change because their identities are less fully formed.

The Court concludes that the diminished culpability of juveniles negates the value of retribution as a penological goal:

Retribution is not proportional if the law's most severe penalty is imposed on one whose culpability or blameworthiness is diminished, to a substantial degree, by reason of youth and immaturity.

The Court notes the "absence of evidence of deterrent effect". The majority reasons that adolescents are not likely to be deterred, quoting from the Thompson plurality opinion to explain that imposing the death penalty would not serve a deterrent purpose for a class of prisoners who were unlikely to engage in "the kind of cost benefit analysis that attaches any weight to the possibility of execution".

Serving no legitimate penological purpose, the juvenile death penalty is held to be unconstitutionally excessive. The majority rejects the view taken by the dissent that youth could be taken into consideration as a mitigating factor during the sentencing phase.

Finally, Justice Kennedy supports the Court's decision by looking to trends in other countries. He says the United States "stands alone in a world that has turned its face against the juvenile death penalty".

=== Dissents ===
The dissents questioned the majority's finding that a "national consensus" had formed, its methodology and the propriety of basing constitutional interpretation on foreign laws.

==== Scalia dissent ====
Justice Scalia wrote a dissent joined by Chief Justice Rehnquist and Justice Thomas.

Justice Scalia's primary objection was that the Court's independent judgment about culpability was "the real force driving" the Court's decision. He criticized the majority's finding of a "national consensus" when more than half the states that allowed capital punishments also allowed the sentence to be imposed on juveniles. Scalia also attacked the majority opinion as being fundamentally antidemocratic. He said the majority had taken it upon themselves to "ratify treaties on behalf of the United States". He argued that it is for legislatures to offer amendments to the Constitution in light of the evolving standard of decency, not for the Court to make what he considered de facto amendments.

==== O'Connor dissent ====
Justice O'Connor agreed with the Court's general methodology but disputed the majority's conclusions. She said the objective evidence for a national consensus was "weaker than in most prior cases in which the Court has struck down a particular punishment". Furthermore, she was skeptical of the Court's conclusion about diminished culpability for those who committed crimes before they turned 18 because the "mitigating characteristics associated with youth [did] not justify an absolute age limit".

== Analysis ==
Psychological and sociological research on adolescent behavior featured prominently in the oral arguments and the Court's reasoning. The majority cited studies submitted in an amicus brief by the American Psychological Association as scientific support for its conclusion that juveniles have diminished culpability. Laurence Steinberg, the APA's chief scientific consultant for the brief, explained that changes in brain structure and function during adolescence correspond to changes in behavior. The use of scientific evidence submitted by amici curiae has been debated in legal scholarship, particularly with respect to the role such evidence should play in judicial decision-making.

Because the Roper majority's finding of a national consensus was weak (twenty states still allowed executions for crimes committed by older adolescents), Roper reignited an ongoing academic debate about how American courts should decide whether a punishment is cruel and unusual.

== Impact ==
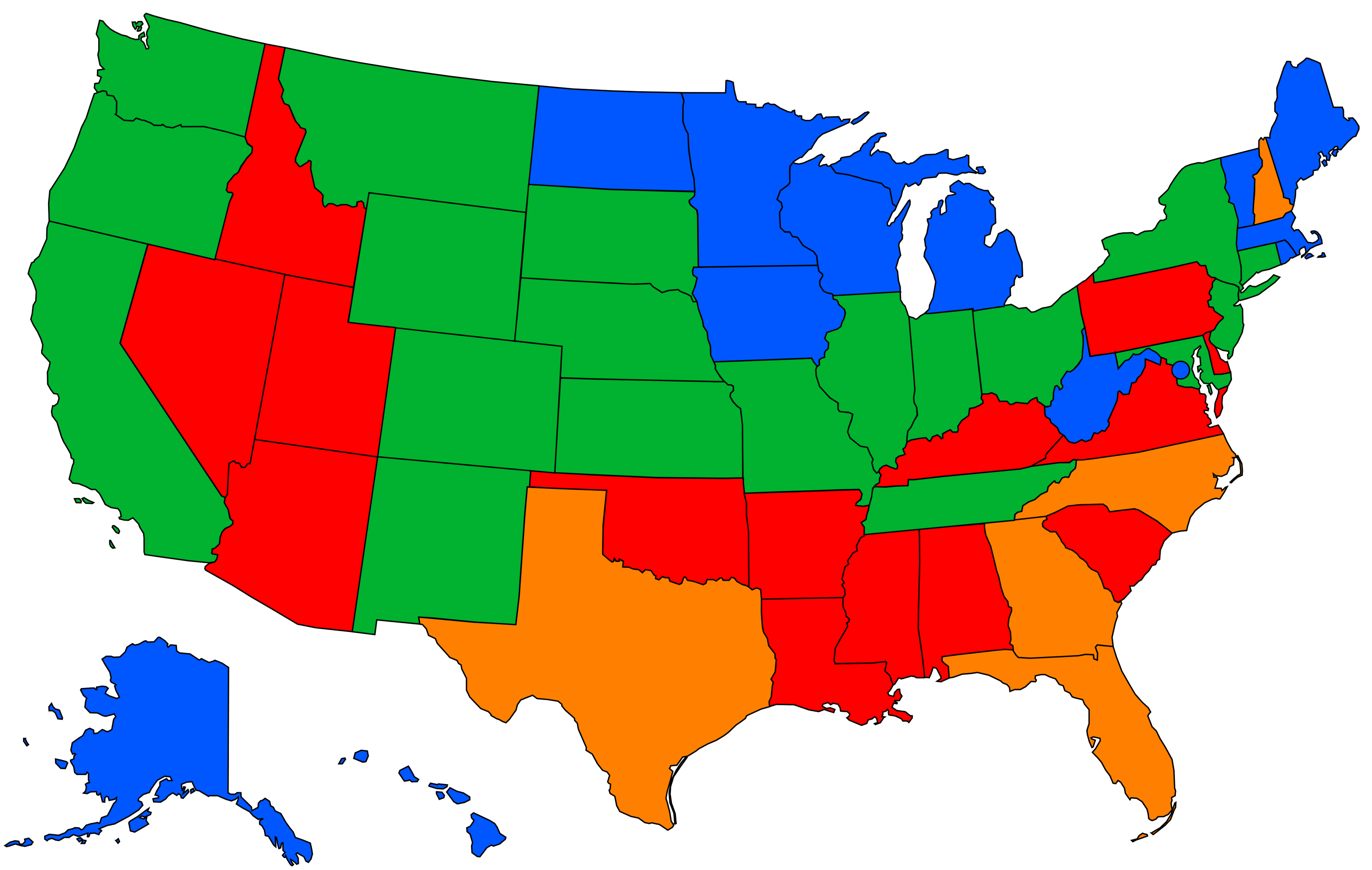
Pre-Roper minimum ages for executions by state No capital punishment Minimum age of 18 Minimum age of 17 Minimum age of 16

The Supreme Court's decision in Roper v. Simmons overturned the death sentences of 72 others who had already been convicted for crimes they committed while younger than age 18. The greatest effects were in Texas, where 29 juvenile offenders were awaiting execution, and in Alabama, where 13 on death row had been sentenced as juveniles. A 73rd juvenile offender, Laquan T. Robinson in Delaware, had been condemned by a jury, but had his sentence hearing delayed to await the outcome of the ruling. The decision also resulted in a judge reducing the sentence of Robinson's adult accomplice, Darrell Page, to life imprisonment on the grounds that his sentence should not be harsher than Robinson’s sentence. A 74th juvenile offender, serial killer Harvey Miguel Robinson, remains on death row for another murder he committed after turning 18.

Four other juvenile offenders had been awaiting new trials or resentencing hearings that were delayed to await the ruling: William Arthur Kelly and Robert Lewis Conyers in South Carolina, James Davolt and Christopher Huerstel in Arizona.

The decision overturned the laws of 19 states that permitted 16-year-olds and 17-year-olds to be sentenced to death.

The impact of this ruling was immediately felt in the State of Virginia, where Lee Boyd Malvo became no longer eligible for the death penalty for his role in the Beltway sniper attacks in October 2002. At the time of the attacks, Malvo was 17 years old. Prosecutor Paul Ebert said he was "going to take a shot at him" but in 2005 said he would not be prosecuting Malvo for the murder of Dean Harold Meyers, since Malvo had already received two life sentences. After Miller v. Alabama held mandatory life without parole sentences unconstitutional for minors, Ebert said he was considering a new trial.

=== Subsequent developments ===
After the Roper decision the APA filed briefs in Graham v Florida and Miller v. Alabama arguing that life without parole sentences for minors were unconstitutional based on developmental science about adolescent risk-taking behavior. Following these rulings, Missouri modified its sentences for juveniles convicted of first degree murder, making Simmons and Benjamin eligible for parole. Both men were released on parole in 2024.

The State of Alabama sought review in the U.S. Supreme Court, raising a single issue, "Whether this Court should reconsider its decision in Roper v. Simmons, 543 U.S. 551 (2005)". The Supreme Court denied certiorari (i.e., declined to take the case for review) on June 19, 2006, without a published dissent.

On September 3, 2025, Louisiana Attorney General Liz Murrill announced that her office would request the court overturn Roper and reinstate the death sentence of a juvenile offender whose death sentence was previously vacated in the aftermath of Roper. A previous attempt by the state of Alabama to overturn Roper in 2006 was unsuccessful.

== See also ==
- Kennedy v. Louisiana (2008)
- Graham v. Florida (2010)
- Miller v. Alabama (2012)
- Capital punishment for juveniles in the United States
