= Thompson v. Oklahoma =

- Supreme Court of the United States

Argued November 9, 1987 Decided June 29, 1988
- Full case name: William Wayne Thompson v. State of Oklahoma
- Citations: 487 U.S. 815 (more) 108 S. Ct. 2687; 101 L. Ed. 2d 702; 1988 U.S. LEXIS 3028; 56 U.S.L.W. 4892
- Opinion announcement: Opinion announcement

Case history
- Prior: Defendant tried as an adult and convicted of murder of his brother-in-law, who had been abusing his ex-wife, who was Thompson's sister; was found guilty; and was sentenced to death. Appealed to Court of Criminal Appeals of Oklahoma, decision affirmed, 1986 OK CR 130, 724 P.2d 780. Appealed to U.S. Supreme Court, granted writ of certiorari, 479 U.S. 1084 (1987).

Holding
- The Eighth and Fourteenth Amendments forbid imposition of the death penalty on offenders who were under the age of 16 when their crimes were committed.

Court membership
- Chief Justice William Rehnquist Associate Justices William J. Brennan Jr. · Byron White; Thurgood Marshall · Harry Blackmun; John P. Stevens · Sandra Day O'Connor; Antonin Scalia · Anthony Kennedy

Case opinions
- Plurality: Stevens, joined by Brennan, Marshall, Blackmun
- Concurrence: O'Connor
- Dissent: Scalia, joined by Rehnquist, White
- Kennedy took no part in the consideration or decision of the case.

Laws applied
- U.S. Const. amends. VIII, XIV

Thompson v. Oklahoma, 487 U.S. 815 (1988), was the first case since the moratorium on capital punishment was lifted in the United States in which the U.S. Supreme Court overturned the death sentence of a minor on grounds of "cruel and unusual punishment." The holding in Thompson was expanded on by Roper v. Simmons (2005), where the Supreme Court extended the "evolving standards" rationale to those under 18 years old.

== Background ==
William Wayne Thompson was a 15-year-old repeat offender from Grady County, Oklahoma. His sister, Vicki, was married to Charles Keene, who was accused of beating Vicki and William. Charles and Vicki had gotten married when Charles was 18 and Vicki was 15; Vicki says that the entire Thompson family was scared of Charles and that he had once ripped out all the telephone wires at the family home. Vicki further says that Charles Keene once held her and Charles' son from the rooftop and threatened to kill him if Vicki left, and that the police could not be contacted because the police liked Charles and Charles was even rumored to be a police informant.

Thompson along with Tony Mann, Richard Jones, and Bobby Glass kidnapped Keene on the night of January 23, 1983, in Amber, Oklahoma. Keene attempted to escape, running to neighbor John "Possum" Brown's door and reportedly screamed, "Possum, open the door, they're going to kill me". Brown opened the door, only to see four men dragging Keene from the door and beating him. When Brown called the police, the assailants grabbed Keene and fled. Keene's body was found later in the nearby river, his body sliced from throat to abdomen. Keene had multiple bruises and two gunshot wounds, along with a concrete block tied to his legs.

Thompson was arrested after Vicki confessed to the police that Thompson told her that he had "taken care of him." Thompson underwent a psychiatric evaluation to determine whether he was eligible to stand trial as an adult. The District Court of Grady County in Chickasha, Oklahoma found that Thompson was responsible for his deeds. He was convicted of murder and sentenced to death by a jury. Mann, Jones and Glass were also convicted of murder and sentenced to death, however Jones was later acquitted in a retrial. Bobby Glass was killed in prison by Jones in 1984, though no charges were filed and it was believed to be self defense.

=== Appeals ===
Thompson's attorneys first attempted to appeal the case on the basis of inflammatory photographs used by the prosecution to allegedly provoke the jury. Although the Oklahoma Court of Criminal Appeals found that two of the photographs should have been excluded from the trial, the overwhelming evidence meant that the case was affirmed by the appellate court.

Due to Thompson's rapidly approaching execution, his attorneys subsequently filed his case with the Supreme Court, saying that the execution of a juvenile was unconstitutional under the Eighth Amendment's "Cruel and Unusual Punishment" clause.

== Opinion of the Court ==
The Court voted 5-3 in favor of Thompson (Justice Kennedy did not participate), holding that Thompson's execution would violate the Eighth Amendment to the United States Constitution as applied to the states through the Fourteenth Amendment. A plurality opinion by Justice Stevens noted the "evolving standards of decency that mark the progress of a maturing society" as a primary rationale for the decision – an opinion that was strongly rejected in Justice Scalia's dissent. The plurality also noted that numerous U.S. jurisdictions and all industrialized Western nations had banned the execution of minors under 16 years of age.

== Aftermath ==
Thompson was later resentenced to life in prison with the possibility of parole. Thompson was granted parole in 2003, but that was later overturned by Oklahoma governor Brad Henry. As of 2025, William Wayne Thompson and Tony Mann were still incarcerated. Thompson's sister Vicki campaigned for him to be paroled.

Thompson was granted parole by a vote of 4-1 in January 2025. Governor Kevin Stitt approved Thompson's parole recommendation in April 2025.

== See also ==
- Capital punishment for juveniles in the United States
- Stanford v. Kentucky (1989) – held that capital punishment was permissible for those aged 16 or 17 at the time of the offense
- Roper v. Simmons (2005) – held that capital punishment is unconstitutional where offender was aged under 18 at the time of the offense
- Atkins v. Virginia (2002) – held that capital punishment is unconstitutional for those with intellectual disabilities
- List of United States Supreme Court cases, volume 487
- List of United States Supreme Court cases
- Lists of United States Supreme Court cases by volume
- List of United States Supreme Court cases by the Rehnquist Court
