= Mark Gardner =

Mark Gardner may refer to:

- Mark Gardner (baseball) (born 1962), former pitcher in Major League Baseball
- Mark Gardner (footballer) (1884–1949), Australian rules footballer
- Mark Gardner (murderer) (1956–1999), murderer executed by the State of Arkansas
- Mark Gardner (politician), politician serving in the Oregon House of Representatives

== See also ==
- Mark Gardener (born 1969), English rock musician
- Mark Gardiner (born 1966), English footballer
- Mark Gardiner (gamer) (born 1983), Scottish semi-professional video gamer
