= Rickey Ray Rector =

American murderer (1950–1992)

- Born: January 12, 1952; Conway, Arkansas, United States
- Died: January 24, 1992 (aged 40); Cummins Unit, Arkansas, U.S.
- Other name: Ricky Ray Rector
- Status: Executed by lethal injection
- Conviction: Capital murder
- Penalty: Death

Details
- Victims: Arthur D. Criswell, 31; Robert W. Martin, 38
- Date: March 21/24, 1981

Rickey Ray Rector (January 12, 1952 – January 24, 1992) was an American convicted murderer who was executed for the 1981 murder of police officer Bob Martin in Conway, Arkansas. After killing a man in a restaurant and fleeing, Rector spent three days on the run before he agreed to turn himself in. However, instead of giving himself up, he shot and killed the police officer to whom he had agreed to turn himself in. He then shot himself in the head in a suicide attempt. The attempt effectively resulted in a lobotomy.

A 1991 request for a writ of certiorari to the Supreme Court was denied, with Justice Thurgood Marshall dissenting. Despite Rector's mental state, then-Arkansas Governor Bill Clinton made a point of returning to Arkansas to personally handle Rector's case during the 1992 U.S. presidential election campaign.

== Early life ==
Rector was born and raised in Conway, Arkansas, as the sixth of seven children to steakhouse cook George Rector and college dorm maid Clyde Lee Rector. As a child, Rector was described as "different and strange", having no friends and keeping to himself, most often sitting under a tree to play with branches. Rector was physically abused by his father, who saw his son's languid behavior as defiance. Though normally introverted and docile, Rector would react violently if bothered, once stabbing his brother in the foot with a pair of scissors for taunting him.

By the time he entered junior high school, Rector possessed only third-grade level writing skills, which was later ascribed to an undiagnosed learning disability. By age 17, Rector developed severe anger issues and regularly got into fights, reportedly due to a mix of insecurity about his poor academic performance, insults about his perceived lack of intelligence by classmates and abusive racial remarks from white townsfolk.

After Rector was expelled from school in tenth grade for fighting, he began working as a blue-collar laborer in construction, often shuffling between Conway and Detroit. Rector married during this timeframe and had several children, both from his wife and extramarital affairs. His criminal record included disorderly conduct, possession of marijuana with intent to sell, assault and battery, grand larceny, forgery, and assault with intent to kill; all charges either led to monetary fines or were dismissed with prejudice.

== Murders and trial ==
On March 21, 1981, Rector and some friends drove to a dance hall at Tommy's Old-Fashioned Home-Style Restaurant in Conway. When one friend who could not pay the $3 cover charge was refused entry, Rector became incensed and pulled a .38 caliber pistol from his waist band. He fired several shots, killing 31-year-old Arthur D. Criswell, who died almost instantly after being struck in the throat and forehead, also wounding 52-year-old William Hervey and his 23-year-old son Charles. Rector left the scene of the murder in a friend's car and wandered the city for three days, staying in the woods or with relatives.

On March 24, Rector's sister convinced him to turn himself in. Rector agreed to surrender, but only to Robert Martin, a local police officer whom he had known since he was a child. Martin arrived at Rector's mother's home shortly after 3 p.m. and chatted with Rector's mother and sister. Shortly thereafter, Rector arrived and greeted Martin. As Martin turned away to continue his conversation with Rector's mother, Rector drew his pistol from under his shirt and fired two shots into Martin, striking him in the jaw and neck. Martin became the first officer of the Conway Police Department to die in the line of duty. Rector then turned and walked out of the house.

Once he had walked past his mother's backyard, Rector put his gun to his own temple and fired. Rector was quickly discovered by other police officers and taken to the local hospital. The shot had destroyed Rector's frontal lobe.

Rector survived the suicide attempt and was put on trial for the first-degree murders of Criswell and Martin, as well as first-degree battery of the Herveys. His defense attorneys argued that Rector was intellectually impaired and not competent to stand trial. However, after hearing conflicting testimony from several experts who had evaluated Rector, Judge George F. Hartje ruled that Rector was competent to stand trial. Rector was convicted on both counts and sentenced to death by the jury.

== Execution ==
Rector was subject to a unique overlap of controversies in 1992, during his execution in Arkansas. An oft-cited example of his mental insufficiency is his decision to save the dessert from his last meal "for later," which would have been after his execution. In 2002, the U.S. Supreme Court banned the execution of people with intellectual disabilities in Atkins v. Virginia, ruling that the practice constitutes cruel and unusual punishment.

=== Last meal ===
For his last meal, Rector requested and received a steak, fried chicken, cherry Kool-Aid, and pecan pie. As noted above, Rector left the pie on the side of the tray, telling the corrections officers who came to take him to the execution chamber that he was "saving it for later." The slice of pecan pie was not disposed of until Rector had been executed.

=== Execution ===
Rector was put to death by lethal injection. It took medical staff more than fifty minutes to find a suitable vein. The curtain remained closed between Rector and the witnesses, but some reported they could hear Rector moaning. The administrator of the State Department of Corrections Medical Program said "the moans did come as a team of two medical people—that had grown to five—worked on both sides of his body to find a vein. That may have contributed to his occasional outbursts." The state later attributed the difficulty in finding a suitable vein to Rector's great weight and to his having been administered an antipsychotic medication.

Rector was the third person executed by the state of Arkansas since Furman v. Georgia, after new capital punishment laws were passed in Arkansas, which came into force on March 23, 1973.

=== Role in 1992 presidential campaign ===
By 1992, Bill Clinton was insisting that Democrats "should no longer feel guilty about protecting the innocent" and indicated his support of capital punishment. To make his point, he flew home to Arkansas mid-campaign to affirm that the execution would continue as scheduled. Some pundits considered it a turning point in that race, hardening a soft public image. Others tend to cite the execution as an example of what they perceive to be Clinton's opportunism, directly influenced by the failed presidential campaign of Michael Dukakis, who was successfully labeled by Republicans as too soft on crime.

Clinton's critics from opponents of capital punishment have seen the case of Rector as an unpleasant example of what they view as Clinton's cynical careerism. The writer Christopher Hitchens, in particular, devotes much of a chapter of his book on Clinton, No One Left to Lie To, to what he regards as the immorality of the then Democratic candidate's decision to condone, and take political advantage of, Rector's execution. Hitchens argues that among other actions, Clinton was attempting to deflect attention from the ongoing Gennifer Flowers sex scandal.

== See also ==
- Capital punishment in Arkansas
- Capital punishment in the United States
- List of people executed in Arkansas
- List of people executed in the United States in 1992

Executions carried out in Arkansas
Preceded by Ronald Gene Simmons June 25, 1990	Ricky Ray Rector; January 24, 1992	Succeeded by Steven Hill May 7, 1992
Executions carried out in the United States
Preceded by Mark Hopkinson – Wyoming January 22, 1992	Ricky Ray Rector – Arkansas; January 24, 1992	Succeeded by Johnny Frank Garrett – Texas February 11, 1992
