= Charles Anthony Boyd =

American serial killer (1959–1999)

- Boyd's 1987 mugshot
- Born: August 17, 1959; Dallas, Texas, U.S.
- Died: August 5, 1999 (aged 39); Huntsville Unit, Texas, U.S.
- Other name: The Bathroom Slayer
- Status: Executed by lethal injection
- Conviction: Capital murder
- Penalty: Death

Details
- Victims: 3
- Span of crimes: 1986–1987
- Country: United States
- State: Texas
- Date apprehended: April 14, 1987

Charles Anthony Boyd (August 17, 1959 – August 5, 1999), known as The Bathroom Slayer, was an American serial killer who raped and killed three women over a nine-month period from 1986 to 1987 in North Dallas, Texas. He was sentenced to death for the final murder and was executed by lethal injection on August 5, 1999.

== Early life ==
A native of Dallas, Boyd was sentenced to five years in prison for sexual assault and burglary. He was later granted early release in November 1985, after serving less than half of his sentence, after which he began working as a janitor at a nearby bank. From July to September 1986, Boyd lived with his brother at his brother's apartment.

== Murders ==
Boyd committed his first murder on July 22, 1986, when 37-year-old Tippawan Nakusan, a Thai immigrant who lived in the apartment just upstairs of his and worked as a waitress, was found stabbed and suffocated to death in her bathtub. On September 15, 1986, an apartment cleaning lady chanced upon 22-year-old Lashun Chappell laying dead in her apartment bathroom. She had been fatally stabbed to death.

On April 13, 1987, 20-year-old Linda Williams returned home to her apartment from work and found her roommate, 21-year-old Mary Milligan's body stuffed in a bathtub, raped, strangled, and drowned. While investigating police assumed her killer was the same one who killed Naksuwan and Thomas, by that time locals and the media had applied the pseudonym of "The Bathroom Slayings" to the string of murders. While observing the scene of Milligan's murder, it was found that some items had been stolen from the apartment. Milligan's car, a 1982 Cadillac was also reported to be stolen from the complex's parking lot. It was later found abandoned.

== Trial and conviction ==
The next day, Boyd was arrested after he attempted to pawn off several of Milligan's personal items. A blood and hair test was conducted after his arrest and confirmed his involvement in her death. After his arrest, he was questioned about the murders of Nakusan and Thomas, to which he confessed. In late April, Boyd was charged with the three counts of capital murder, but prosecutors only moved forward with the Milligan case because it contained forensic evidence. The trial began in early October and Boyd's lawyers claimed he was intellectually disabled and therefore could not be given a death sentence. His lawyers contested that Boyd's alleged IQ of 67 should have been considered as mitigation, but prosecutors rejected this by releasing a prison file which showed that Boyd, had an IQ of 80. After ten minutes of deliberating, the jury reached a guilty verdict for Boyd in November 1987, and a month later they sentenced him to death.

== Execution ==
On August 5, 1999, Boyd was executed by lethal injection in the execution chamber at the Huntsville Unit, twelve days shy of his 40th birthday. Prior to his execution, he was asked if he would like to make a final statement, for which he declined. When the drugs took effect, however, he claimed that he was innocent; "I want you all to know I did not do this crime. I wanted to wait for a thirty day stay for a DNA test so you know who did the crime." Not long after, Boyd let out a gasp and went silent. He was pronounced dead at 6:16 p.m.

== See also ==
- Capital punishment in Texas
- Capital punishment in the United States
- List of people executed by lethal injection
- List of people executed in Texas, 1990–1999
- List of people executed in the United States in 1999
- List of serial killers in the United States
