= List of people executed in the United States in 1999 =

Ninety-eight people, all male, were executed in the United States in 1999 in twenty states, ninety-four by lethal injection, three by electrocution, and one by gas chamber. The most recent execution by gas chamber occurred this year. With ninety-eight executions carried out, 1999 remains the year with the highest number of executions in a single year in the United States since the resumption of executions in 1976. Conversely, Illinois conducted its final execution in 1999 before the state abolished the death penalty in 2011. On December 9, 1999, four executions were carried out in the United States on the same day, the highest number of executions in a single day since the 1950s. This has occurred only once in the modern era.

Ohio carried out its first execution since 1963, that of Wilford Berry Jr., who waived his appeals.

The state of Oklahoma executed Sean Sellers, who became the only juvenile to face the death penalty in the United States for a crime committed under the age of 17 prior to Roper v. Simmons, which banned capital punishment nationwide for anyone under the age of eighteen. Sellers was the first executed for a crime committed at the age of 16 since Leonard Shockley in 1959.

== List of people executed in the United States in 1999 ==
No.	Date of execution	Name	Age of person			Gender	Ethnicity	State	Method	Ref.
No.	Date of execution	Name	At execution	At offense	Age difference	Gender	Ethnicity	State	Method	Ref.
1	January 5, 1999	John Glenn Moody	46	35	11	Male	White	Texas	Lethal injection	
2	January 7, 1999	John Walter Castro	37	22	15	Male	Native American	Oklahoma	Lethal injection	
3	January 8, 1999	Ronnie Howard	40	27	13	Male	Black	South Carolina	Lethal injection	
4	January 8, 1999	Dobie Gillis Williams	38	23	15	Male	Black	Louisiana	Lethal injection	
5	January 13, 1999	Kelvin Shelby Malone	38	20	18	Male	Black	Missouri	Lethal injection	
6	January 13, 1999	Jess James Gillies	38	20	18	Male	White	Arizona	Lethal injection	
7	January 13, 1999	Troy Dale Farris	36	21	15	Male	White	Texas	Lethal injection	
8	January 20, 1999	Mark Arlo Sheppard	27	22	5	Male	Black	Virginia	Lethal injection	
9	January 22, 1999	Joseph Ernest Atkins	51	38	13	Male	White	South Carolina	Lethal injection	
10	January 26, 1999	Martin Sauceda Vega	53	39	14	Male	Hispanic	Texas	Lethal injection	
11	February 3, 1999	Darrick Leonard Gerlaugh	38	19	19	Male	Native American	Arizona	Lethal injection	
12	February 4, 1999	Sean Richard Sellers	29	16	13	Male	White	Oklahoma	Lethal injection	
13	February 4, 1999	Tony Leslie Fry	23	19	4	Male	White	Virginia	Lethal injection	
14	February 9, 1999	Jaturun Siripongs	47	30	17	Male	Asian	California	Lethal injection	
15	February 10, 1999	George Cordova	39	20	19	Male	Hispanic	Texas	Lethal injection	
16	February 11, 1999	Danny Lee Barber	43	24	19	Male	White	Texas	Lethal injection	
17	February 16, 1999	Andrew Flores Cantu	31	22	9	Male	Hispanic	Texas	Lethal injection	
18	February 16, 1999	Johnie Michael Cox	42	32	10	Male	White	Arkansas	Lethal injection	
19	February 19, 1999	Wilford Lee Berry Jr.	36	27	9	Male	White	Ohio	Lethal injection	
20	February 24, 1999	James Edward Rodden	38	23	15	Male	White	Missouri	Lethal injection	
21	February 24, 1999	Norman Evans Green	38	24	14	Male	Black	Texas	Lethal injection	
22	February 24, 1999	Karl-Heinz LaGrand	35	18	17	Male	White	Arizona	Lethal injection	
23	March 3, 1999	Walter Bernhard LaGrand	37	19	18	Male	White	Arizona	Gas chamber	
24	March 9, 1999	George Adrian Quesinberry Jr.	37	28	9	Male	White	Virginia	Lethal injection	
25	March 10, 1999	Roy Michael Roberts	46	30	16	Male	White	Missouri	Lethal injection	
26	March 17, 1999	Andrew Kokoraleis	35	18	17	Male	White	Illinois	Lethal injection	
27	March 25, 1999	David Lee Fisher	57	42	15	Male	White	Virginia	Lethal injection	
28	March 26, 1999	Charles Henry Rector	44	27	17	Male	Black	Texas	Lethal injection	
29	March 26, 1999	James David Rich	26	22	4	Male	White	North Carolina	Lethal injection	
30	March 30, 1999	Robert Excell White	61	36	25	Male	White	Texas	Lethal injection	
31	April 5, 1999	Alvaro C. Calambro	25	20	5	Male	Asian	Nevada	Lethal injection	
32	April 12, 1999	Marion Albert Pruett	49	32	17	Male	White	Arkansas	Lethal injection	
33	April 13, 1999	Carl Hamilton Chichester	36	29	7	Male	Black	Virginia	Lethal injection	
34	April 14, 1999	Roy Ramsey Jr.	45	35	10	Male	Black	Missouri	Lethal injection	
35	April 20, 1999	Arthur Ray Jenkins III	29	22	7	Male	White	Virginia	Lethal injection	
36	April 23, 1999	David J. Lawrie	37	31	6	Male	White	Delaware	Lethal injection	
37	April 28, 1999	Ralph Edward Davis	61	48	13	Male	Black	Missouri	Lethal injection	
38	April 28, 1999	Aaron Christopher Foust	26	24	2	Male	White	Texas	Lethal injection	
39	April 28, 1999	Eric Christopher Payne	26	24	2	Male	White	Virginia	Lethal injection	
40	April 29, 1999	Ronald Dale Yeatts	38	28	10	Male	White	Virginia	Lethal injection	
41	May 4, 1999	Manuel Pina Babbitt	50	31	19	Male	Black	California	Lethal injection	
42	May 4, 1999	Jose Eligio De La Cruz	31	19	12	Male	Hispanic	Texas	Lethal injection	
43	May 5, 1999	Robert Wayne Vickers	41	20	21	Male	White	Arizona	Lethal injection	
44	May 5, 1999	Clydell Coleman	62	52	10	Male	Black	Texas	Lethal injection	
45	May 25, 1999	Edward Lee Harper Jr.	50	33	17	Male	White	Kentucky	Lethal injection	
46	May 26, 1999	Jessie Lee Wise	46	35	11	Male	Black	Missouri	Lethal injection	
47	June 1, 1999	William Hamilton Little	38	23	15	Male	White	Texas	Lethal injection	
48	June 3, 1999	Scotty Lee Moore	42	27	15	Male	White	Oklahoma	Lethal injection	
49	June 16, 1999	Bruce W. Kilgore	38	25	13	Male	Black	Missouri	Lethal injection	
50	June 16, 1999	Michael Kent Poland	59	36	23	Male	White	Arizona	Lethal injection	
51	June 17, 1999	Joseph Stanley Faulder	61	37	24	Male	White	Texas	Lethal injection	
52	June 18, 1999	Brian Keith Baldwin	40	18	22	Male	Black	Alabama	Electrocution	
53	June 30, 1999	Robert Allen Walls	33	20	13	Male	White	Missouri	Lethal injection	
54	July 1, 1999	Charles Daniel Tuttle	35	30	5	Male	White	Texas	Lethal injection	
55	July 6, 1999	Gary Michael Heidnik	55	43	12	Male	White	Pennsylvania	Lethal injection	
56	July 7, 1999	Tyrone Leroy Fuller	35	24	11	Male	Black	Texas	Lethal injection	
57	July 8, 1999	Norman Lee Newsted	45	29	16	Male	White	Oklahoma	Lethal injection	
58	July 8, 1999	Allen Lee Davis	54	37	17	Male	White	Florida	Electrocution	
59	July 21, 1999	Thomas David Strickler	33	24	9	Male	White	Virginia	Lethal injection	
60	August 4, 1999	Ricky Don Blackmon	41	29	12	Male	White	Texas	Lethal injection	
61	August 5, 1999	Charles Anthony Boyd	39	27	12	Male	Black	Texas	Lethal injection	
62	August 6, 1999	Victor Kennedy	37	18	19	Male	Black	Alabama	Electrocution	
63	August 10, 1999	Kenneth Dwayne Dunn	39	20	19	Male	Black	Texas	Lethal injection	
64	August 11, 1999	James Otto Earhart	56	44	12	Male	White	Texas	Lethal injection	
65	August 17, 1999	Marlon DeWayne Williams	26	20	6	Male	Black	Virginia	Lethal injection	
66	August 18, 1999	Joe Mario Trevino Jr.	37	20	17	Male	Hispanic	Texas	Lethal injection	
67	September 1, 1999	David Raymond Leisure	49	30	19	Male	White	Missouri	Lethal injection	
68	September 1, 1999	Raymond James Jones	39	28	11	Male	Black	Texas	Lethal injection	
69	September 8, 1999	Mark Edward Gardner	43	29	14	Male	White	Arkansas	Lethal injection	
70	September 8, 1999	Alan L. Willett	52	46	6	Male	White	Arkansas	Lethal injection	
71	September 10, 1999	Willis Jay Barnes	51	39	12	Male	Black	Texas	Lethal injection	
72	September 14, 1999	William Prince Davis	42	21	21	Male	Black	Texas	Lethal injection	
73	September 16, 1999	Everett Lee Mueller	51	42	9	Male	White	Virginia	Lethal injection	
74	September 21, 1999	Richard Wayne Smith	43	36	7	Male	White	Texas	Lethal injection	
75	September 24, 1999	Willie G. Sullivan	27	19	8	Male	Black	Delaware	Lethal injection	
76	September 24, 1999	Harvey Lee Green Jr.	38	23	15	Male	Black	North Carolina	Lethal injection	
77	October 12, 1999	Alvin Wayne Crane	41	28	13	Male	White	Texas	Lethal injection	
78	October 14, 1999	Gerald Walter McFadden	51	38	13	Male	White	Texas	Lethal injection	
79	October 15, 1999	Joseph Mitchell Parsons	35	23	12	Male	White	Utah	Lethal injection	
80	October 19, 1999	Jason Matthew Joseph	27	20	7	Male	Black	Virginia	Lethal injection	
81	October 21, 1999	Arthur Martin Boyd Jr.	53	36	17	Male	White	North Carolina	Lethal injection	
82	October 27, 1999	Ignacio Alberto Ortiz	57	37	20	Male	Hispanic	Arizona	Lethal injection	
83	October 28, 1999	Domingo Cantu Jr.	31	20	11	Male	Native American	Texas	Lethal injection	
84	November 9, 1999	Thomas Lee Royal Jr.	32	26	6	Male	Black	Virginia	Lethal injection	
85	November 12, 1999	Leroy Joseph Drayton	44	29	15	Male	Black	South Carolina	Lethal injection	
86	November 16, 1999	Desmond Dominique Jennings	28	22	6	Male	Black	Texas	Lethal injection	
87	November 17, 1999	John Michael Lamb	42	25	17	Male	White	Texas	Lethal injection	
88	November 18, 1999	Jose Angel Gutierrez	39	28	11	Male	Hispanic	Texas	Lethal injection	
89	November 19, 1999	David Junior Brown	51	32	19	Male	Black	North Carolina	Lethal injection	
90	December 2, 1999	Cornel Cooks	43	26	17	Male	Black	Oklahoma	Lethal injection	
91	December 3, 1999	David Charles Rocheville	31	22	9	Male	White	South Carolina	Lethal injection	
92	December 8, 1999	David Martin Long	46	33	13	Male	White	Texas	Lethal injection	
93	December 9, 1999	Bobby Lynn Ross	41	24	17	Male	Black	Oklahoma	Lethal injection	
94	December 9, 1999	D.H. Fleenor	48	31	17	Male	White	Indiana	Lethal injection	
95	December 9, 1999	James Lee Beathard	42	27	15	Male	White	Texas	Lethal injection	
96	December 9, 1999	Andre Lee Graham	29	23	6	Male	Black	Virginia	Lethal injection	
97	December 14, 1999	Robert Ronald Atworth	31	26	5	Male	White	Texas	Lethal injection	
98	December 15, 1999	Sammie Felder Jr.	54	29	25	Male	Black	Texas	Lethal injection	
		Average:	41 years	28 years	13 years					

== Demographics ==
Gender
Male	98	100%
Female	0	0%
Ethnicity
White	53	54%
Black	33	34%
Hispanic	7	7%
Native American	3	3%
Asian	2	2%
State
Texas	35	36%
Virginia	14	14%
Missouri	9	9%
Arizona	7	7%
Oklahoma	6	6%
Arkansas	4	4%
North Carolina	4	4%
South Carolina	4	4%
Alabama	2	2%
California	2	2%
Delaware	2	2%
Florida	1	1%
Illinois	1	1%
Indiana	1	1%
Kentucky	1	1%
Louisiana	1	1%
Nevada	1	1%
Ohio	1	1%
Pennsylvania	1	1%
Utah	1	1%
Method
Lethal injection	94	96%
Electrocution	3	3%
Gas chamber	1	1%
Month
January	10	10%
February	12	12%
March	8	8%
April	10	10%
May	6	6%
June	7	7%
July	6	6%
August	7	7%
September	10	10%
October	7	7%
November	6	6%
December	9	9%
Age
20–29	13	13%
30–39	37	38%
40–49	27	28%
50–59	17	17%
60–69	4	4%
Total	98	100%

== Executions in recent years ==
Number of executions
2000	85
1999	98
1998	68
Total	251

Preceded by 1998	List of people executed in the United States in 1999	Succeeded by 2000
