= David Martin Long =

American murderer (1953–1999)

- Born: July 15, 1953; Tom Green County, Texas, U.S.
- Died: December 8, 1999 (aged 46); Huntsville Unit, Texas, U.S.
- Status: Executed by lethal injection
- Conviction: Capital murder
- Penalty: Death

Details
- Victims: 5–7
- Span of crimes: 1978–1986
- States: Texas; California
- Date apprehended: October 24, 1986

David Martin Long (July 15, 1953 – December 8, 1999) was an American serial killer who was sentenced to death for the murders of three women, and later confessed to committing seven murders. His case received media attention after he was placed on life support for a drug overdose two days before his scheduled execution. The New York Times said that the medical personnel who treated Long "found themselves in the odd situation of trying to restore to good health a man with only two days left to live."

A native of Texas, Long grew up mostly in California. He started drinking alcohol at age 12, was sent to a reformatory around that time, and spent many years addicted to drugs. In 1986, Long confessed to killing three women in Lancaster, Texas; he was convicted of capital murder and sent to death row. He was never tried for any other murders, but while in police custody for the murders in Lancaster, he confessed to two additional crimes: the fatal 1978 beating of a gas station attendant in San Bernardino, California, and a 1983 arson that killed his former boss, Bobby Neal Rogers, in Bay City, Texas.

Long later confessed to setting a 1986 fire in West Texas that killed two women. Although it is unclear if Long's confession was truthful, it sparked new interest in the validity of Ernest Willis's conviction for the crime. The conviction was overturned and Willis was released from prison in 2004, having spent 17 years on death row. Prosecutors concluded that even if the fire was intentionally set, Willis had not been involved.

On December 6, 1999, two days before Long was to be executed, he took an overdose of prescription drugs. He was placed on a ventilator and admitted to an intensive care unit in Galveston, Texas. Officials in Texas refused to delay his execution. Long's condition improved significantly by the day after the overdose. He was placed on a medically supervised flight back to death row in Huntsville on December 8, and he was executed that day as scheduled.

== Early life ==
Long was born in Tom Green County, Texas. He had two brothers and a sister, and he lived in California as a child. Two of Long's older siblings said that their father was an alcoholic who often neglected them. Long's behavior became problematic after their mother died when Long was ten years old. He was sent to foster homes, and he was enrolled in a reformatory by the age of 12. He began regularly drinking alcohol around that time, and he subsequently abused illicit drugs, including heroin, cocaine and methamphetamine.

As a young man, Long worked as an installation technician for cable television companies in Texas. One of his coworkers said that Long made a strong first impression on people because of his good looks and blue eyes. Another coworker said that Long had a demanding personality when he was working under the influence of drugs.

== Triple murder ==
On September 19, 1986, after being expelled from an alcohol rehabilitation program in Little Rock, Arkansas, Long was hitchhiking when 37-year-old Donna Sue Jester gave him a ride and allowed him to stay at her home in Lancaster, Texas. In exchange for having a place to live, Long agreed to perform repair work on the home. Jester lived with her 64-year-old blind and bedridden adoptive mother, Dalpha Lorene Jester, and with 20-year-old Laura Lee Owens. (Note: Some sources list the third victim's name as Laura Lee Owen.) Long and Owens began a romantic relationship. Like Long, Owens was homeless and had been allowed to stay in the Jester home.

The three women were killed with a steak knife and a hatchet on September 27, but their bodies were not discovered for two days. Based on crime scene evidence, police officers believed that Long killed Donna Sue and Dalpha Jester first. They said that Owens came home, saw the two dead women, and tried to flee before Long killed her. Long left the house in a station wagon belonging to Donna Sue Jester.

== Arrest, release, and recapture ==
The night of the murders, Long was arrested for drunken driving in Leon County, Texas, about 100 miles south of Lancaster. He was still driving Donna Sue Jester's vehicle, heading north in a southbound lane on Interstate 45. Officers said that Long had run several cars off the road, that he banged his head on the police car until he was bleeding, and that he was "ranting and raving about Jesus or God."

Long told Leon County jailers about killing the three women in Lancaster. However, the women's bodies had not been discovered, so Long's story was not taken seriously and he was released from jail on September 29. A jailer said that before Long's release, he woke up Sheriff Royce Wilson; the jailer said he was told to forget about Long's murder claims. Wilson later said that no one told him about a possible murder confession. Police in Lancaster discovered the murdered women's bodies the same day Long was released from jail. Long became a suspect in the Lancaster murders when officers found an entry in Donna Sue Jester's diary that described how she met Long and allowed him to move in with her. He was apprehended in Austin for public intoxication on October 24. He had hitchhiked, and the driver called police when Long passed out in the vehicle. (Note: Long used an alias at the time of his arrest, but officers in Austin had already been warned to be on the lookout for him. Fingerprints confirmed Long's identity.)

While he was in police custody, Long granted an interview to The Dallas Morning News in which he confessed to killing the three women in Lancaster. He said that he "just got tired of hearing all the bickering" from the women, and he said that the women had objected to his drinking. "I've got something in my head that clicks sometimes. It just goes off," he said. Long said that he was not bothered by committing the murders, saying that he felt like he was watching a movie during the killings.

In the same interview, Long confessed to the murders of gas station attendant James Carnell in San Bernardino, California, and Long's former boss, Bob Neal Rogers, in Bay City, Texas. Long said that Carnell's 1978 murder occurred after Carnell had overcharged him for the repair of a tire. He said he beat Carnell with a tire iron and then shoved a broom handle down Carnell's throat. Rogers, who died in 1983 after his mobile home was set on fire, had angered Long by accusing him of misuse of a company vehicle. Long had been arrested shortly after the Bay City fire, but a grand jury had found insufficient evidence for an indictment. Long said he thought his criminal tendencies would get better with time, but he noticed that they were getting worse. He said that Texas seemed to fairly dispense the death penalty, and he indicated that he was "pretty much ready to call it a day" because of his demented personality, saying that he did not belong in society. "I think I need to go ahead and leave," he continued. "I like to call it being put to sleep, kind of like they do to animals."

== Trial ==
For the murders of the three women in Lancaster, Long was indicted by a Dallas County grand jury in November 1986. He entered a plea of not guilty, claiming insanity. His trial began in January 1987. Defense attorneys requested a change of venue out of Dallas County, but the trial proceeded in Dallas.

Long's attorneys built their defense around his history of psychiatric problems, including schizophrenia, and his reported head injuries. Before the trial, Long told a psychiatrist that Donna Jester's home had a foul smell and that he became agitated around foul odors because he associated them with his mother's death. Long suspected that dead bodies were buried behind Jester's home. He said that he retrieved the hatchet on the day of the murders because he thought the three women in the Jester home were conspiring against him and trying to jeopardize his relationship with Owens.

On the witness stand, Long said he believed that some of his actions were related to being possessed by Satan. Psychologist William Hester testified for the defense, stating that Long was likely psychotic – and may have been hallucinating from alcohol withdrawal – at the time of the crime. The prosecution pointed to inconsistencies between two of Hester's interviews with Long, and they highlighted one of Hester's earlier written notes, which said Hester found no evidence that Long was insane. Testifying for the state, psychiatrist James Grigson said that Long had antisocial personality disorder, which he said was not considered a mental disease or defect. Grigson said that Long could distinguish right from wrong at the time of the crime.

While the court was in session on February 4, Long stood up and yelled to the jury that he was guilty and that he never wanted to advance the insanity defense in the first place. Long first asked Judge Larry Baraka if he was allowed to change his plea from not guilty to no contest. Then, against the advice of his attorneys, he asked to be able to enter a guilty plea. Judge Baraka noted Long's request without ruling on whether he would instruct the jury to automatically find Long guilty.

Long was convicted of murder on February 7, 1987. At Long's request, his attorneys did not present any evidence during the punishment phase of the trial. The jury sentenced him to the death penalty on February 10, 1987.

== Time on death row ==
Three years after arriving on death row, Long gave investigators a three-hour confession in which he admitted to starting a 1986 house fire that killed two women in the West Texas town of Iraan. Long said that he set the fire because he was angry at Billy Willis, one of the occupants of the house. Billy's cousin, Ernest Willis, had already been found guilty of capital murder in connection with the fire, and he had been sentenced to the death penalty in 1987. The prosecutor in the case had described the evidence against Ernest Willis as circumstantial.

When Willis's appeals attorneys called Long to the witness stand during an evidentiary hearing, Long refused to testify. The presiding judge allowed the videotape of Long's confession to be admitted into court, but he said that Willis's attorneys had to present evidence to corroborate Long's story before the confession would make a difference in the case.

Willis's appeals lawyers spent several years looking for evidence to support Long's version of the events. They found that Long knew Billy Willis because the two had engaged in criminal activity together for many years. In Long's confession, he said that he used a mixture of Everclear and Wild Turkey to start the fire, and subsequent experiments showed that such a mixture could be used as an accelerant in this type of fire. Long was also associated with arson as a modus operandi, having confessed to the Bay City fire.

An eyewitness to the fire, Amelia Fuentes, testified that she had seen a vehicle driving slowly past her house before officials arrived to respond to the fire. Fuentes said she had never seen the vehicle before, but when she told the police about, she was told to forget about it.

In 2004, Willis's conviction was overturned due to deficient legal representation and evidence that the state had unnecessarily medicated Willis during his trial. New fire investigators looked at the case and said that there was no physical evidence from this fire that supported a finding of arson. They said the fire was more likely caused by an electrical problem. In his decision to dismiss the charges against Willis, Pecos County district attorney Ori White concluded that even if the fire was intentionally set, there was no evidence that Willis was involved.

According to author Welsh White, Long's confession was probably untrue, but it was "the catalyst that precipitated the massive investigation that resulted in Willis's exoneration."

In Long's own death penalty case, he lost a 1991 appeal to the Texas Court of Criminal Appeals. The next year, the U.S. Supreme Court denied his request for writ of certiorari. His execution was scheduled for September 17, 1992, but two days before he was set to die, he received a stay of execution to pursue further appeals.

== Overdose ==
Long exhausted his appeals and was scheduled for execution on December 8, 1999. Two days before the scheduled execution, Long was found unresponsive after taking an overdose of antipsychotic medication. He was placed on life support and admitted to an intensive care unit in Galveston, Texas. On December 7, Long improved enough that his breathing tube was removed.

On December 8, the day of Long's scheduled execution, Long remained on oxygen but his condition was upgraded from critical to serious, and state officials asked intensive care physician Alexander Duarte to sign an affidavit stating that it would be safe to transport Long to Huntsville. Duarte refused, saying that under normal circumstances Long would have stayed in intensive care for another day or two. The doctor warned that Long still required continual medical care. That same day, state officials arranged a medically supervised transport from Galveston to Huntsville via airplane so that he could be executed as scheduled.

== Execution ==
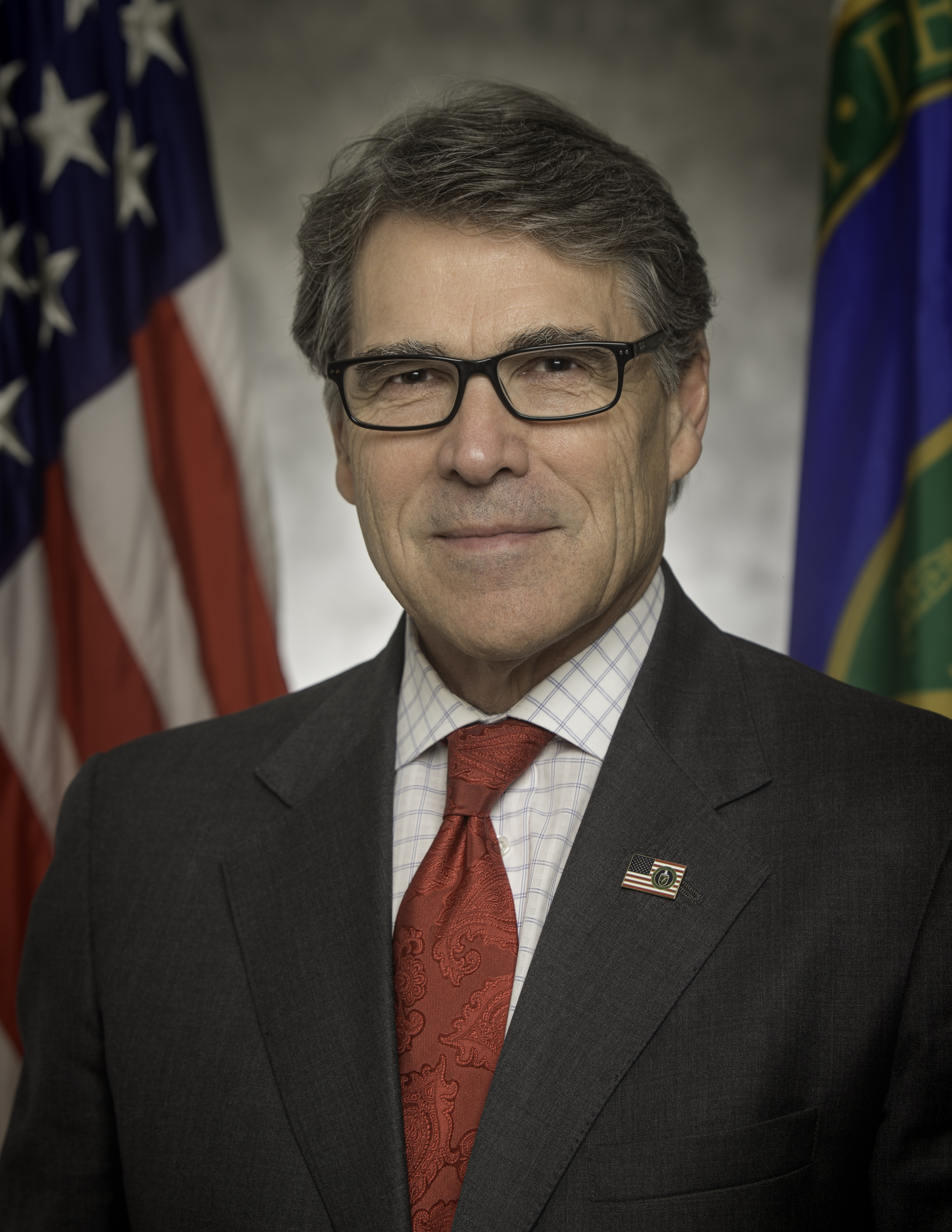
Rick Perry, the Texas lieutenant governor who refused Long's stay of execution. Perry later became Governor of Texas.

Having found no relief from appellate courts, Long's attorneys asked for clemency from the Texas Board of Pardons and Paroles; this request was also denied. Long's legal team appealed to Governor George W. Bush for a 30-day stay of execution because of Long's hospitalization. Bush was out of state campaigning for the Republican presidential nomination, so Lt. Governor Rick Perry was left with the decision. Perry refused to grant a stay, and a spokesperson for Bush said that the governor agreed with Perry's decision. The U.S. Supreme Court rejected Long's final appeal, and he was taken to the execution chamber. He was executed, as scheduled, on December 8, 1999.

Long gave a last statement, saying:

Ah, just ah sorry y'all. I think of tried everything I could to get in touch with y'all to express how sorry I am. I, I never was right after that incident happened. I sent a letter to somebody, you know a letter outlining what I feel about everything. But anyway I just wanted, right after that apologize to you. I'm real sorry for it. I was raised by the California Youth Authority, I can't really pin point where it started, what happened but really believe that's just the bottom line, what happened to me was in California. I was in their reformatory schools and penitentiary, but ah they create monsters in there. That's it, I have nothing else to say. Thanks for coming Jack.

== See also ==
- Capital punishment in Texas
- Capital punishment in the United States
- List of people executed in Texas, 1990–1999
- List of people executed in the United States in 1999
- List of serial killers in the United States
