= Daniel Lee Corwin =

American serial killer (1958–1998)

- Mugshot of Daniel Lee Corwin c. 1990
- Born: September 13, 1958; Orange County, California, U.S.
- Died: December 7, 1998 (aged 40); Huntsville Unit, Texas, U.S.
- Status: Executed by lethal injection
- Convictions: Capital murder Attempted capital murder Aggravated rape
- Penalty: Death

Details
- Victims: 3
- Span of crimes: February – July 1988
- Country: United States
- State: Texas
- Date apprehended: October 1988

Daniel Lee Corwin (September 13, 1958 – December 7, 1998) was an American serial killer who was sentenced to death and executed for murdering three women across three counties in Texas between February and July 1987. After his conviction for an attempted murder, he confessed to the previous crimes, for which he was tried, convicted, and eventually executed.

Corwin's case is notable as he is the first person to be tried and successfully convicted under Texas' "serial killer statute".

== Early life ==
Little is known of Corwin's background. Born in Orange County, California on September 13, 1958, he was one of two children born to Phil and Nancy Corwin, who also had a daughter named Debbie. At some point, the family moved to Temple, Texas, where the young Corwin became a Boy Scout, worked as a Sunday School teacher and was reportedly a good student. It is known that Corwin suffered two severe cuts to the head during accidents; later, psychologists suggested that this caused him brain damage.

== Crimes ==
=== 1975 attack ===
In 1975, Corwin abducted a classmate at knifepoint in their high school parking lot while she was getting into her car. He drove her to a remote location in her own car and raped her. He then dragged her out of the car, knocked her down, slit her throat, and stabbed her in the stomach and heart. As she lay in a dirt pit bleeding, he covered her head with a board and covered it with dirt and leaves. She survived and managed to reach the road where she was eventually seen and saved. Corwin was sentenced to forty years in prison for aggravated rape. He was released early after serving nine years.

=== Murders ===
On February 13, 1987, Corwin abducted 72-year-old Alice Martin, who was walking to her home in Normangee, Texas from a routine walk she did around town. He drove her to a field in Robertson County where he raped, gagged and stabbed her. Her body was found on the following day, but due to the lack of an apparent motive at first, authorities were unable to locate a suspect. The murder came as a shock to the local community, as Martin, a retired postmistress and wife of the local commissioner, was well-respected in the area. Eventually, the Robertson County CrimeStoppers branch and the Normangee State Bank raised a total of $12,000 as a reward for any potential information that could lead to an arrest.

In May of that year, following the arrest of murderer James Otto Earhart, authorities investigated him for involvement in the Martin murder, but he was quickly ruled out.

On July 10, 1987, Corwin kidnapped at gunpoint 26-year-old Debra Lynn Ewing from an insurance office at the Huntsville Vision Center in Huntsville. He then drove her to Montgomery County, where he raped and stabbed her. Despite a witness being present and describing the abductor in detail, authorities failed to identify Corwin as a suspect at this time.

On October 31, 1987, he attempted to kidnap 36-year-old Mary Carrell Risinger at a car wash in Huntsville. When she resisted, Corwin stabbed her in the throat.

== Final attack, arrest, and trials ==
=== First trial ===
On October 20, 1988, he abducted 21-year-old college student Wendy Gant in a parking lot of Olsen Field at Texas A&M University, using her car to drive them to an isolated rural area near College Station, where he bound, raped, beat, and stabbed Gant several times. Corwin then tied her upright to a tree and slit her throat. Gant managed to free herself and hid until Corwin left, later being found in a parking lot by a county employee and taken to hospital.

Gant requested a forensic artist, but due to her throat being cut so deeply, she could not speak aloud to describe the assailant. Instead, she communicated through writing to artist Karen T. Taylor, and nodded yes or no to Taylor's questions about the attacker's features. A corrections officer who knew Corwin from prison immediately recognized the sketch and reported Corwin's name to the police, who learned that he had stopped attending classes in May 1987 and that he was on parole for the sexual assault charge. Shortly after his arrest, authorities announced that he was a suspect in the three murders, but that they had not yet gathered enough evidence to charge him.

Police subsequently found a fingerprint from Corwin on the driver's side door of Gant's vehicle. In 1989, he pleaded guilty to attempted capital murder in the case and was sentenced to 99 years in prison.

=== Confessions and capital murder trial ===
A little more than a month after the attempted murder conviction, Corwin confessed to the murders of Ewing and Risinger, leading to authorities issuing search warrants to seize his personal belongings for DNA testing. In the course of the following two months, Corwin additionally admitted to killing Martin as well, but claimed that it was unintentional. Despite his admissions, he was indicted on 3 counts of capital murder under the state's serial murder clause.

Corwin's second trial began in March 1990 in Montgomery County, under the agreement that it would prosecute him for the murders in the two other counties as well. During the trial, the prosecutor presented circumstantial evidence from three laboratory technicians with the Texas Department of Public Safety that three hairs found in Corwin's pickup truck were consistent with hairs from Ewing and Risinger, while a fourth indicated that one other hair also linked him to the Martin murder. In addition, multiple witnesses indicated unusual occurrences surrounding the dates of the murders, such as one employer of Corwin noticing that he had a strange cut on his finger; when asked, Corwin claimed that he had cut himself while attempting to open a jar.

As the trial progressed, the prosecution presented transcripts of Corwin's confessions that, while having gaps due to the fact that he could not conclusively recall every event, showed that Corwin vividly recalled details about the murders that only the killer would know. Prison psychologist Lou Davis testified that Corwin was initially hesitant to talk about the crime out of fear of being labeled a "serial killer", but eventually opened up about the crimes, claiming that he felt guilty and wanted to tell somebody.

On March 17, 1990, Corwin was convicted of the capital murders of Martin and Risinger, making him the first person to be convicted under Texas' serial killer statute. His lawyer objected to the conviction, claiming that he denied access to an attorney despite asking for one on at least two occasions. Four days later, after less than 35 minutes of deliberation, the jury recommended that Corwin be sentenced to death.

== Imprisonment and execution ==
After spending eight years on death row, Corwin was executed by lethal injection at the Huntsville Unit on December 7, 1998.

== In the media ==
His case was shown on Forensic Files II. The episode, titled "Portrait of a Serial Killer," originally aired on HLN on March 15, 2020.

== See also ==
- Capital punishment in Texas
- Capital punishment in the United States
- List of people executed in Texas, 1990–1999
- List of people executed in the United States in 1998
- List of serial killers in the United States
