= Wilford Berry Jr. =

American murderer (1962–1999)

- Mug shot of Berry
- Born: September 2, 1962; Houston, Texas, U.S.
- Died: February 19, 1999 (aged 36); Southern Ohio Correctional Facility, Lucasville, Ohio, U.S.
- Cause of death: Execution by lethal injection
- Other name: The Volunteer
- Convictions: Aggravated murder Aggravated robbery Aggravated burglary
- Penalty: Death (August 13, 1990)

Wilford Lee Berry Jr. (September 2, 1962 – February 19, 1999) was an American murderer. He was known as "The Volunteer" because he was the first convict to waive his right to appeal his death sentence after Ohio reinstated capital punishment, and was executed by lethal injection. His conviction and sentence stemmed from the November 30, 1989, shooting death of his employer, 52-year-old Charles Mitroff of Cleveland, Ohio.

== Crime ==
As part of his plan to murder Mitroff, Berry supplied his accomplice and co-worker, Anthony Lozar, with a gun and kept a gun for himself. When Mitroff returned to the bakery after making deliveries, Lozar shot him in the torso. When Mitroff fell to the floor injured, Berry approached him and shot him in the head. Berry and Lozar then buried Mitroff in a shallow grave near a bridge and stole his van. After he was arrested in Kentucky driving the stolen delivery van while driving drunk, Berry confessed to police and bragged about the murder to his fellow jail inmates.

At times, Berry offered two different explanations for his actions. One was that he killed Mitroff for revenge for almost running over Berry's sister with the delivery van, while the other was that he killed him for no special reason.

Based upon his confessions and significant amounts of circumstantial forensic evidence linking him to the crime, a jury found Berry guilty of aggravated murder with the death penalty and firearm specifications, aggravated robbery and aggravated burglary.

== Incarceration ==
After his direct appeal in 1997, Berry notified the state courts that he wished to forgo any further challenges to his conviction and sentence and that he desired to submit to the execution of his death sentence. The Ohio Public Defender, who had mandatorily represented Berry in his direct appeal, claimed that he was not mentally competent to make such a decision. The state of Ohio filed a motion for a competency hearing with the Supreme Court of Ohio, and that court ordered an evaluation of Berry's competence.

Two psychiatrists appointed by the court diagnosed a mixed personality disorder with schizotypal, borderline and antisocial features but found him to be competent to waive his rights. The public defender called two witnesses at the competency hearing. One psychologist found Berry incompetent to waive his rights, concluding that Berry had schizotypal personality disorder, a rigid thought process, a tendency toward extreme isolation and withdrawal, and a tendency to have psychotic episodes under stress. The second witness, a psychologist who never examined Berry and had no opinion as to his competence, testified generally regarding schizotypal personality disorder and its relevance in determining a person's competence.

After hearing the evidence, the trial judge issued an order on July 22, 1997, found that, although having a mixed personality disorder with schizotypal, borderline and antisocial features, Berry "is competent to forego [sic] any and all further legal challenges".

== Prison assault ==
On September 5, 1997, Berry was assaulted by inmates housed in his cell block who had gained control in a riot. He was targeted because his fellow death row inmates felt that his "volunteer status" would negatively affect their efforts to delay their own executions. Berry's jaw and facial bones were badly broken during the assault and required surgery and metal implants to repair the damage. Berry's right hand was also heavily damaged because he used it in an attempt to protect the back of his head from blows inflicted by a heavy padlock swung on a chain. Berry also suffered several broken ribs, bruised internal organs, and required staples in his head.

== Death ==
His supporters unsuccessfully sought to use those injuries to establish that Berry was no longer competent, but the state and federal courts repeatedly rejected that argument. On February 19, 1999, his execution was carried out via lethal injection.

Berry's accomplice, Lozar, was convicted of murder and was sentenced to a life term. He can be considered for parole in 2036.

== See also ==
- Capital punishment in Ohio
- Capital punishment in the United States
- List of people executed in Ohio
- List of people executed in the United States in 1999

== General references ==
- Ohio Executes Berry 'The Volunteer' Gets His Wish, Is First Executed In State Since 1963, Akron Beacon Journal (Ohio), February 20, 1999.
- Berry Executed; First in Ohio in 36 Years; "Volunteer" Given Lethal Injection', Plain Dealer (Cleveland, Ohio), February 20, 1999.
- Franklin v. Francis, 997 F. Supp. 916 (1998)
- State v. Berry, 85 Ohio St. 3d 1201 (1999)
- State v. Berry, 72 Ohio St. 3d 354 (1995)
- 2005 Capital Crimes Report (pdf) Office of the Ohio Attorney General.
- Ohio Executions 1999 to Present. Ohio Department of Rehabilitation and Correction. Retrieved on 2007-11-17.
- Court won't block execution. The Post (1999-02-18). Retrieved on 2007-11-17.
- Thornburgh, Nathan. When a Killer Wants to Die. TIME Magazine (2005-04-18). Retrieved on 2007-11-17.

Executions carried out in Ohio
Preceded by Donald Reinbolt March 15, 1963	Wilford Berry Jr. February 19, 1999	Succeeded by Jay D. Scott June 14, 2001
Executions carried out in the United States
Preceded by Andrew Cantu – Texas February 16, 1999	Wilford Berry Jr. – Ohio; February 19, 1999	Succeeded by James Rodden – Missouri February 24, 1999
