= Stanley Faulder =

- Born: Joseph Stanley Faulder; October 19, 1937; Jasper, Alberta, Canada
- Died: June 17, 1999 (aged 61); Huntsville Unit, Texas, U.S.
- Status: Executed by lethal injection
- Convictions: Canada; Auto theft Texas; Capital murder
- Penalty: Canada; Three years imprisonment Texas; Death

Joseph Stanley Faulder (October 19, 1937 – June 17, 1999) was the first Canadian citizen to be executed in the United States since 1952.

Stanley Faulder, a Jasper, Alberta native, was convicted of murdering Inez Scarborough Phillips, a 75-year-old woman, in Texas in 1975 during a robbery in her house. He was caught, convicted, and sentenced to death in 1977. Faulder had previously served three years in prison for auto theft in Canada.

Despite diplomatic complaints by the Canadian government, Faulder was executed by lethal injection on June 17, 1999. His last appeal was rejected about an hour before his death. He is buried at Captain Joe Byrd Cemetery.

== See also ==
- Capital punishment in Texas
- Capital punishment in the United States
- List of people executed in Texas, 1990–1999
- List of people executed in the United States in 1999
