= List of people executed in the United States in 1992 =

Thirty-one people, all male, were executed in the United States in 1992, twenty-one by lethal injection, eight by electrocution, and two by gas chamber. Six particularly notable executions were those of Rickey Ray Rector, Robert Alton Harris (the first execution in California since 1967), Steven Brian Pennell (the first execution in Delaware since 1946), Donald Harding (the first execution in Arizona since 1963), Mark Allen Hopkinson (the first and currently the only execution in Wyoming since 1965), and Roger Keith Coleman. Coleman was controversially executed by Virginia despite serious doubts about his actual guilt. However, in 2004, posthumous DNA testing confirmed his guilt.

== List of people executed in the United States in 1992 ==
No.	Date of execution	Name	Age of person			Gender	Ethnicity	State	Method	Ref.
No.	Date of execution	Name	At execution	At offense	Age difference	Gender	Ethnicity	State	Method	Ref.
1	January 22, 1992	Mark Allen Hopkinson	42	29	13	Male	White	Wyoming	Lethal injection	
2	January 22, 1992	Joe Angel Cordova	39	29	10	Male	Hispanic	Texas	Lethal injection	
3	January 24, 1992	Rickey Ray Rector	40	29	11	Male	Black	Arkansas	Lethal injection	
4	February 11, 1992	Johnny Frank Garrett	28	17	11	Male	White	Texas	Lethal injection	
5	February 28, 1992	David Michael Clark	32	27	5	Male	White	Texas	Lethal injection	
6	March 3, 1992	Edward Anthony Ellis	38	29	9	Male	White	Texas	Lethal injection	
7	March 10, 1992	Robyn Leroy Parks	37	23	14	Male	Black	Oklahoma	Lethal injection	
8	March 13, 1992	Olan Randle Robison	46	34	12	Male	White	Oklahoma	Lethal injection	
9	March 14, 1992	Steven Brian Pennell	34	30	4	Male	White	Delaware	Lethal injection	
10	March 20, 1992	Larry Gene Heath	40	29	11	Male	White	Alabama	Electrocution	
11	April 6, 1992	Donald Eugene Harding	43	30	13	Male	White	Arizona	Gas chamber	
12	April 21, 1992	Robert Alton Harris	39	25	14	Male	White	California	Gas chamber	
13	April 23, 1992	Billy Wayne White	34	18	16	Male	Black	Texas	Lethal injection	
14	May 7, 1992	Justin Lee May	46	32	14	Male	White	Texas	Lethal injection	
15	May 7, 1992	Steven Douglas Hill	25	18	7	Male	White	Arkansas	Lethal injection	
16	May 12, 1992	Nollie Lee Martin	43	28	15	Male	White	Florida	Electrocution	
17	May 20, 1992	Jesus Romero Jr.	27	19	8	Male	Hispanic	Texas	Lethal injection	
18	May 20, 1992	Roger Keith Coleman	33	22	11	Male	White	Virginia	Electrocution	
19	May 22, 1992	Robert Vannoy Black Jr.	45	38	7	Male	White	Texas	Lethal injection	
20	July 21, 1992	Edward Dean Kennedy	47	35	12	Male	Black	Florida	Electrocution	
21	July 23, 1992	Edward Benton Fitzgerald Sr.	34	23	11	Male	White	Virginia	Electrocution	
22	July 30, 1992	William Andrews	37	19	18	Male	Black	Utah	Lethal injection	
23	August 11, 1992	Curtis Lee Johnson	38	29	9	Male	Black	Texas	Lethal injection	
24	September 15, 1992	Willie Leroy Jones	34	25	9	Male	Black	Virginia	Electrocution	
25	September 22, 1992	James Demouchette	37	21	16	Male	Black	Texas	Lethal injection	
26	October 21, 1992	Ricky Lee Grubbs	33	25	8	Male	White	Missouri	Lethal injection	
27	October 23, 1992	John Sterling Gardner Jr.	34	24	10	Male	White	North Carolina	Lethal injection	
28	November 19, 1992	Jeffery Lee Griffin	37	24	13	Male	Black	Texas	Lethal injection	
29	November 20, 1992	Cornelius Singleton	36	21	15	Male	Black	Alabama	Electrocution	
30	December 10, 1992	Kavin Wayne Lincecum	29	22	7	Male	Black	Texas	Lethal injection	
31	December 10, 1992	Timothy Dale Bunch	33	23	10	Male	White	Virginia	Electrocution	
		Average:	37 years	26 years	11 years					

== Demographics ==
Gender
Male	31	100%
Female	0	0%
Ethnicity
White	18	58%
Black	11	35%
Hispanic	2	6%
State
Texas	12	39%
Virginia	4	13%
Alabama	2	6%
Arkansas	2	6%
Florida	2	6%
Oklahoma	2	6%
Arizona	1	3%
California	1	3%
Delaware	1	3%
Missouri	1	3%
North Carolina	1	3%
Utah	1	3%
Wyoming	1	3%
Method
Lethal injection	21	68%
Electrocution	8	26%
Gas chamber	2	6%
Month
January	3	10%
February	2	6%
March	5	16%
April	3	10%
May	6	19%
June	0	0%
July	3	10%
August	1	3%
September	2	6%
October	2	6%
November	2	6%
December	2	6%
Age
20–29	4	13%
30–39	18	58%
40–49	9	29%
Total	31	100%

== Executions in recent years ==
Number of executions
1993	38
1992	31
1991	14
Total	83

Preceded by 1991	List of people executed in the United States in 1992	Succeeded by 1993
