= James Otto Earhart =

Executed American murderer and suspected serial killer

- Born: April 29, 1943; Huntsville, Texas, U.S.
- Died: August 11, 1999 (aged 56); Huntsville Unit, Huntsville, Texas, U.S.
- Cause of death: Execution by lethal injection
- Other name: George Stevens
- Conviction: Capital murder
- Penalty: Death

Details
- Victims: 2–3+
- Span of crimes: 1981–1987
- Country: United States
- State: Texas
- Date apprehended: May 26, 1987

James Otto Earhart (April 29, 1943 – August 11, 1999) was an American murderer, kidnapper and suspected serial killer executed for the 1987 kidnap-murder of 9-year-old Kandy Janell Kirtland in Bryan, Texas. Suspected in at least one more murder during his lifetime, Earhart was posthumously linked to a 1981 murder via DNA conducted by Parabon NanoLabs in 2019, and authorities are investigating whether he can be linked to any other violent crimes committed in Brazos County.

== Kirtland case ==
On May 12, 1987, 9-year-old Kandy Janell Kirtland, a fourth-grade student at Crockett Elementary School in Bryan, Texas was dropped off by bus at an intersection steps away from her house. Reportedly, she left her backpack at the front door as she used her key to open the door. She put her key down in the kitchen and went back to retrieve her backpack. At around 3:40 PM, the girl was seen talking to a man who had parked his car in front of the driveway. When her parents returned home, Kirtland was not at home but her key was next to the stove and her backpack was still at the front door and they quickly reported her missing.

Authorities interviewed witnesses, who described the man as a heavyset white male with either dishwater blond or brown hair, weighing approximately 400 pounds and driving a brown/burnt orange 1976 model Chevrolet Impala. They also claimed that he had stopped by the house on the previous day, inquiring whether he could buy a paint gun from the Kirtlands. Soon after, the FBI became involved in the case, and an identikit was distributed to help locate the suspect. On May 22, the Bryan Police Department issued an arrest warrant for James Otto Earhart, a 44-year-old local junk dealer who lived in a house shared with his mother and siblings, who matched the description of Kirtland's abductor. A day after the announcement, authorities released a photograph of Earhart in the press and distributed 5,000 flyers in Bryan and Houston.

On the early morning of May 26, 1987, Earhart was found sleeping in a recently traded car in the Stubblefield Lake area of the Sam Houston National Forest. He was arrested without offering any resistance, and a .22-caliber pistol was seized from the front seat of his vehicle. Upon inspection of his home, authorities located a piece of paper with the Kirtland's home address written on it, as well as newspaper clippings regarding Kandy's abduction. He was placed in the Brazos County Jail with a $75,000 bond, but denied any and all responsibility in the girl's abduction. Later that same day, a man taking a stroll around a road leading towards the surrounding forest accidentally stumbled upon a pile of rags and cardboards that had a white tennis shoe sticking out of it, and upon closer inspection, noticed that an ankle was protruding from there. He then hurried back home and quickly contacted the local authorities, who quickly deduced that the body belonged to a young girl. While it was suspected early on that the body was that of Kirtland, it was sent to the Southwest Forensic Institute in Dallas for an autopsy. In the meantime, Earhart's bond was raised to $100,000, with Bryan Police Chief Charles Phelps announcing that his department would investigate him in at least two additional murders in the vicinity. The respective victims were 51-year-old Ruth Richardson Green, who was abducted from a Bryan bakery on February 8, 1986, and found shot to death near Huntsville, while the other was 71-year-old Alice Martin, a retired Normangee postmistress who was found stabbed to death on February 14, 1987.

On May 28, the autopsy confirmed that the body indeed belonged to Kirtland, resulting in Earhart being charged with capital murder and first-degree kidnapping. Due to the severity of the crime, the trial venue was moved to Giddings and Earhart was ordered to undergo a psychological evaluation at the Memorial City Hospital in Houston.

== Trial, imprisonment and execution ==
At a pre-trial hearing, Earhart claimed that he had made his confession during an exhausted state and supposedly under the effects of hypnosis. However, the prosecution's witnesses continued to claim that he matched the exact description of the man who was seen talking to Kirtland on the day of her abduction, that he had exchanged his cars at a dealership under the alias "George Stevens" and a hotel clerk testified that he had taken some towels with him while on the run from the police. In the end, Earhart was found guilty by jury verdict after less than three hours of deliberation, and was promptly sentenced to death.

In June 1993, the Supreme Court reviewed the cases of Earhart and several other death row inmates, following a recent ruling in the case of Dorsie Johnson. His sentence was not commuted, and he was promptly scheduled to be executed on August 11, 1999. Earhart made no final statement, and was executed via lethal injection in the Huntsville Unit on the designated date.

== Posthumous findings ==
After his execution, Earhart's body was interred at the Blackjack Cemetery in Huntsville, but his DNA was not collected by authorities at the time. In 2017, Parabon NanoLabs were asked by the Brazos County Police Department to aid with the county's oldest cold case: the December 1, 1981, murder of 40-year-old realtor Virginia "Ginger" Freeman, who had been repeatedly bludgeoned, stabbed and strangled in a house in College Station, which she had planned to sell to a supposed client. An examination of DNA extracted from underneath her fingernails led to a familial match to Earhart's son, and with this, the company brought their findings to the authorities. On June 26, 2018, Earhart's body was exhumed and sampled, with the remains sent to the Institute of Forensic Anthropology at the University of North Texas for further analysis.

In October 2019, the Brazos County Sheriff's Office officially confirmed the match, thus solving Freeman's murder. His DNA was later entered into CODIS, as authorities believe he might have committed other violent crimes in the county. As of November 2021, he remains a suspect in Ruth Richardson Green's murder. Texas-area serial killer Daniel Lee Corwin was later convicted and executed for killing Alice Martin, as well as two other women.

== See also ==
- Capital punishment in Texas
- List of people executed by lethal injection
- List of people executed in Texas, 1990–1999
- List of people executed in the United States in 1999
- Parabon NanoLabs
