= List of people executed in Texas, 1990–1999 =

The following is a list of people executed by the U.S. state of Texas between 1990 and 1999. All of the 166 people (165 males and 1 female) during this period were convicted of murder and executed by lethal injection at the Huntsville Unit in Huntsville, Texas.

== Executions 1990–1999 ==
The number in the "#" column indicates the nth person executed since 1982 (when Texas resumed the death penalty). As an example, Jerome Butler (the first person executed in Texas during the 1990 decade) was the 34th person executed since resumption of the death penalty.

1990 – 4 executions
#	Executed person	Ethnicity	Age	Sex	Date of execution	County	Victim(s)	Governor
34	Jerome Butler	Black	54	M	21-Apr-1990	Harris	Nathan Oakley (Note: Butler was also convicted of murdering A.C. Johnson.)	Bill Clements
35	Johnny Ray Anderson	White	30	M	17-May-1990	Jefferson	Ronald Goode	Bill Clements
36	James Edward Smith	Black	37	M	26-Jun-1990	Harris	Larry Rohus	Bill Clements
37	Mikel James Derrick	White	33	M	18-Jul-1990	Harris	Edward Sonnier	Bill Clements
1991 – 5 executions
38	Lawrence Lee Buxton	Black	38	M	26-Feb-1991	Harris	Joel Slotnik	Ann Richards
39	Ignacio Cuevas	Hispanic	59	M	23-May-1991	Harris (Note: On a change of venue from Walker.)	Julia Standley and Yvonne Beseda	Ann Richards
40	Jerry Joe Bird	White	54	M	17-Jun-1991	Cameron	Victor Trammell	Ann Richards
41	James Russell	Black	42	M	19-Sep-1991	Fort Bend	Thomas Steams	Ann Richards
42	G. W. Green	White	49	M	12-Nov-1991	Montgomery	John Denson	Ann Richards
1992 – 12 executions								Ann Richards
43	Joe Angel Cordova	Hispanic	39	M	22-Jan-1992	Harris	Masel Williams	Ann Richards
44	Johnny Frank Garrett	White	28	M	11-Feb-1992	Potter	Tadea Benz	Ann Richards
45	David Michael Clark	White	32	M	28-Feb-1992	Brazos	Charles Gears and Beverly Benninghoff	Ann Richards
46	Edward Anthony Ellis	White	38	M	03-Mar-1992	Harris	Bertie Eakens	Ann Richards
47	Billy Wayne White	Black	34	M	23-Apr-1992	Harris	Martha Spinks	Ann Richards
48	Justin Lee May	White	46	M	07-May-1992	Brazoria	Jeanetta Murdaugh and Frank Murdaugh	Ann Richards
49	Jesus Romero Jr.	Hispanic	27	M	20-May-1992	Cameron	Olga Perales	Ann Richards
50	Robert Vannoy Black Jr.	White	45	M	22-May-1992	Brazos	Sandra Black	Ann Richards
51	Curtis Lee Johnson	Black	38	M	11-Aug-1992	Harris	Murray Dale Sweat	Ann Richards
52	James Demouchette	Black	37	M	22-Sep-1992	Harris	Scott Sorell, Robert White, and Johnny Swift	Ann Richards
53	Jeffery Lee Griffin	Black	37	M	19-Nov-1992	Harris	David Sobotik and Horacio DeLeon	Ann Richards
54	Kavin Wayne Lincecum	Black	29	M	10-Dec-1992	Brazoria	Kathy Coppedge and Casey Coppedge	Ann Richards
1993 – 17 executions								Ann Richards
55	Sandoval "Carlos" Santana	Hispanic	40	M	23-Mar-1993	Harris	Oliver Flores	Ann Richards
56	Ramón Montoya Facundo	Hispanic	38	M	25-Mar-1993	Dallas	Dallas Police Officer John Pasco	Ann Richards
57	Darryl Elroy Stewart	Black	38	M	04-May-1993	Harris	Donna Kate Thomas	Ann Richards
58	Leonel Torres Herrera	Hispanic	45	M	12-May-1993	Cameron	TDPS state trooper David Irvine Rucker and Los Fresnos police officer Enrique L. Carrisalez	Ann Richards
59	John Christopher Sawyers	White	38	M	18-May-1993	Harris	Ethel Delany	Ann Richards
60	Markham Duff-Smith	White	46	M	29-Jun-1993	Harris	Gertrude Duff-Smith Zabolio	Ann Richards
61	Curtis Paul Harris	Black	31	M	01-Jul-1993	Brazos	Timothy Merka	Ann Richards
62	Danny Ray Harris	Black	32	M	30-Jul-1993	Brazos	Timothy Merka	Ann Richards
63	Joseph Paul Jernigan	White	39	M	05-Aug-1993	Navarro	Edward Hale	Ann Richards
64	David Lee Holland Sr.	White	58	M	12-Aug-1993	Jefferson	Helen Barnard and Dianna Jackson	Ann Richards
65	Carl Eugene Kelly	Black	34	M	20-Aug-1993	McLennan	Steven Pryor and David Riley	Ann Richards
66	Ruben Montoya Cantu	Hispanic	26	M	24-Aug-1993	Bexar	Pedro Gomez	Ann Richards
67	Richard James Wilkerson	Black	29	M	31-Aug-1993	Harris	4 murder victims (Note: The 4 victims were: Roddy Harris, Arnold Pequeño, Joerene Pequeño, and Anil Varughese.)	Ann Richards
68	Johnny James	White	39	M	03-Sep-1993	Chambers	Barbara Mayfield	Ann Richards
69	Antonio Nathaniel Bonham	Black	33	M	28-Sep-1993	Harris	Marie McGowen	Ann Richards
70	Anthony Quinn Cook	White	34	M	10-Nov-1993	Milam	David VanTassel Jr.	Ann Richards
71	Clifford X. Phillips	Black	59	M	15-Dec-1993	Harris	Iris Siff	Ann Richards
1994 – 14 executions								Ann Richards
72	Harold Amos Barnard	White	51	M	02-Feb-1994	Galveston	Tuan Nguyen	Ann Richards
73	Freddie Lee Webb Jr.	Black	33	M	31-Mar-1994	Nueces	Leopoldo Cantu	Ann Richards
74	Richard Lee Beavers	White	39	M	04-Apr-1994	Harris	Douglas Odle	Ann Richards
75	Larry Norman Anderson	White	41	M	26-Apr-1994	Harris	Zelda Webster	Ann Richards
76	Paul Rougeau	Black	46	M	03-May-1994	Harris	Harris County Deputy Constable Albert Wilkins	Ann Richards
77	Stephen Ray Nethery	White	33	M	27-May-1994	Dallas	Dallas Police Officer John McCarthy	Ann Richards
78	Denton Alan Crank	White	38	M	14-Jun-1994	Harris	Terry Oringderff	Ann Richards
79	Robert Nelson Drew	White	35	M	02-Aug-1994	Harris	Jeffrey Mayes	Ann Richards
80	Jessie Gutierrez	Hispanic	29	M	16-Sep-1994	Brazos	Dorothy McNew	Ann Richards
81	George Douglas Lott	White	47	M	20-Sep-1994	Potter (Note: On a change of venue from Tarrant.)	Christopher Marshall and John Edwards	Ann Richards
82	Walter Key Williams	Black	32	M	05-Oct-1994	Bexar	Daniel Leipold	Ann Richards
83	Warren Eugene Bridge	White	34	M	22-Nov-1994	Galveston	Walter Rose	Ann Richards
84	Herman Robert Charles Clark Jr.	Black	48	M	06-Dec-1994	Harris	Joseph McClain	Ann Richards
85	Raymond Carl Kinnamon	White	53	M	11-Dec-1994	Harris	Ronald Longmire	Ann Richards
1995 – 19 executions								Ann Richards
86	Jesse Dewayne Jacobs	White	44	M	04-Jan-1995	Walker (Note: On a change of venue from Montgomery.)	Etta Ann Urdiales	Ann Richards
87	Mario S. Márquez	Hispanic	36	M	17-Jan-1995	Bexar	Rebecca Marquez and Rachel Gutierrez	Ann Richards
88	Clifton Charles Russell Jr.	White	38	M	31-Jan-1995	Taylor	Hubert Tobey	George W. Bush
89	Willie Ray Williams	Black	38	M	31-Jan-1995	Harris	Claude Schaffer Jr.	George W. Bush
90	Jeffrey Dean Motley	White	29	M	07-Feb-1995	Harris	Maria Adelia Duran	George W. Bush
91	Billy Conn Gardner	White	52	M	16-Feb-1995	Dallas	Thelma Row	George W. Bush
92	Samuel Christopher Hawkins	Black	52	M	21-Feb-1995	Lubbock	Abbe Rodgers Hamilton (Note: Hawkins was also sentenced to death for the murder of Rhonda Keys.)	George W. Bush
93	Noble D. Mays Jr.	White	42	M	06-Apr-1995	Wilbarger	Jerry Lamb	George W. Bush
94	Fletcher Thomas Mann	White	34	M	01-Jun-1995	Dallas	Christopher Bates and Barbara Hoppe	George W. Bush
95	Ronald Keith Allridge	Black	34	M	08-Jun-1995	Tarrant	Carla McMillan (Note: Allridge was also convicted of murdering Lorenzo Kneeland.)	George W. Bush
96	John W. Fearance Jr.	Black	40	M	20-Jun-1995	Dallas	Larry Faircloth	George W. Bush
97	Karl Hammond	Black	31	M	21-Jun-1995	Bexar	Donna Lynn Vetter	George W. Bush
98	Vernon Lamar Sattiewhite	Black	40	M	15-Aug-1995	Bexar	Sandra Sorrell	George W. Bush
99	Carl Johnson Jr.	Black	40	M	19-Sep-1995	Harris	Ed Thompson	George W. Bush
100	Harold Joe Lane	White	50	M	04-Oct-1995	Dallas	Tammy Davis	George W. Bush
101	Bernard Eugene Amos	Black	33	M	06-Dec-1995	Dallas	Dallas Police Officer James Joe	George W. Bush
102	Hai Hai Vuong	Asian	40	M	07-Dec-1995	Jefferson	Hien Quang Tau and Tien Van Nguyen	George W. Bush
103	Esequel Banda	Hispanic	31	M	11-Dec-1995	Hamilton	Merle Laird	George W. Bush
104	James Michael Briddle	White	40	M	12-Dec-1995	Harris	Robert Banks and Bob Skeens	George W. Bush
1996 – 3 executions								George W. Bush
105	Leo Ernest Jenkins Jr.	White	38	M	09-Feb-1996	Harris	Mark Kelley and Kara Kelley Voss	George W. Bush
106	Kenneth Granviel	Black	45	M	27-Feb-1996	Tarrant	7 murder victims (Note: The 7 victims were: Natasha McClendon, Steven McClendon, Martha McClendon, Laura McClendon, Linda McClendon, Betty Williams, and Vera Hill.)	George W. Bush
107	Joe Fedelfido Gonzales Jr.	Hispanic	36	M	18-Sep-1996	Potter	William J. Veader	George W. Bush
1997 – 37 executions								George W. Bush
108	Richard Lewis Brimage Jr.	White	42	M	10-Feb-1997	Kleberg	Mary Beth Kunkel	George W. Bush
109	John Kennedy Barefield	Black	32	M	12-Mar-1997	Harris	Cindy Rounseville	George W. Bush
110	David Lee Herman	White	39	M	02-Apr-1997	Tarrant	Jennifer Burns	George W. Bush
111	David Wayne Spence	White	40	M	03-Apr-1997	McLennan	Jill Montgomery, Kenneth Franks, and Raylene Rice	George W. Bush
112	Billy Joe Woods	White	50	M	14-Apr-1997	Harris	Mabel Ehatt	George W. Bush
113	Kenneth Edward Gentry	White	36	M	16-Apr-1997	Denton	Jimmy Don Ham	George W. Bush
114	Benjamin Herbert Boyle	White	53	M	21-Apr-1997	Potter	Gail Lenore Smith	George W. Bush
115	Ernest Orville Baldree	White	55	M	29-Apr-1997	Navarro	Homer Howard and Nancy Howard	George W. Bush
116	Terry David Washington	Black	33	M	06-May-1997	Walker	Beatrica Huling	George W. Bush
117	Anthony Ray Westley	Black	36	M	13-May-1997	Harris	Frank Hall	George W. Bush
118	Clifton Eugene Belyeu	White	38	M	16-May-1997	McLennan	Melodie Bolton	George W. Bush
119	Richard Gerry Drinkard	White	39	M	19-May-1997	Harris	Ladean Hendrix, Lou Ann Anthony, and Jerry Mullis	George W. Bush
120	Clarence Allen Lackey	White	42	M	20-May-1997	Tom Green	Toni Dianne Kumpf	George W. Bush
121	Bruce Edwin Callins	Black	37	M	21-May-1997	Tarrant	Allen Huckleberry	George W. Bush
122	Larry Wayne White	White	47	M	22-May-1997	Harris	Elizabeth St. John (Note: White was also convicted in Florida for the murder of Mae Bailey.)	George W. Bush
123	Robert Anthony Madden	White	33	M	28-May-1997	Leon	Herbert Megason and Don Megason	George W. Bush
124	Patrick Fitzgerald Rogers	Black	33	M	02-Jun-1997	Collin	Paris Police Officer David Roberts	George W. Bush
125	Kenneth Bernard Harris	Black	34	M	03-Jun-1997	Harris	Lisa Stonestreet	George W. Bush
126	Dorsie Lee Johnson-Bey Jr.	Black	30	M	04-Jun-1997	Scurry	Jack Huddleston	George W. Bush
127	Davis Losada	Hispanic	32	M	04-Jun-1997	Cameron	Olga Lidia Perales	George W. Bush
128	Earl Russell Behringer	White	33	M	11-Jun-1997	Tarrant	Daniel Meyer	George W. Bush
129	David Wayne Stoker	White	38	M	16-Jun-1997	Hale	David Manrique	George W. Bush
130	Eddie James Johnson	Black	44	M	17-Jun-1997	Aransas	David Magee, Virginia Cadena, and Elizabeth Galvan	George W. Bush
131	Irineo Tristán Montoya	Hispanic	29	M	18-Jun-1997	Cameron	John Kilheffer	George W. Bush
132	Robert Wallace West Jr.	White	35	M	29-Jul-1997	Harris	DeAnn Klaus	George W. Bush
133	James Carl Lee Davis	Black	34	M	09-Sep-1997	Travis	Yvette Johnson, Tony Johnson, and Tyran Johnson	George W. Bush
134	Jessel Turner	White	37	M	22-Sep-1997	Harris	Charles Hunter	George W. Bush
135	Benjamin Curt Stone	White	45	M	25-Sep-1997	Nueces	Patsy Stone and Kathy Lynn Van Coney	George W. Bush
136	John William Cockrum	White	38	M	30-Sep-1997	Bowie	Eva May	George W. Bush
137	Dwight Dwayne Adanandus	Black	41	M	01-Oct-1997	Bexar	Vernon Hanon	George W. Bush
138	Ricky Lee Green	White	36	M	08-Oct-1997	Tarrant	Steven Fefferman (Note: Green was also convicted of murdering Jeffrey Davis and Sandra Bailey.)	George W. Bush
139	Kenneth Ray Ransom	Black	34	M	28-Oct-1997	Harris	4 murder victims	George W. Bush
140	Aua Lauti	Pacific Islander	43	M	04-Nov-1997	Harris	Tara Lauti	George W. Bush
141	Aaron Lee Fuller	White	30	M	06-Nov-1997	Dawson	Loretta Stephens	George W. Bush
142	Michael Eugene Sharp	White	43	M	19-Nov-1997	Crockett	Brenda Broadway and Christie Elms	George W. Bush
143	Charlie Lee Livingston	Black	35	M	21-Nov-1997	Harris	Janet Caldwell	George W. Bush
144	Michael Lee Lockhart	White	37	M	09-Dec-1997	Bexar (Note: On a change of venue from Jefferson.)	Beaumont police officer Paul Douglas Hulsey Jr (Note: Lockhart was also sentenced to death in Indiana for the murder of Windy Gallagher, and in Florida for the murder of Jennifer Coulhouer.)	George W. Bush
1998 – 20 executions								George W. Bush
145	Karla Faye Tucker	White	38	F	03-Feb-1998	Harris	Jerry Lynn Dean and Deborah Thornton	George W. Bush
146	Steven Ceon Renfro	White	40	M	09-Feb-1998	Harrison	Rhena Fultner, Rose Rutledge, and George Counts	George W. Bush
147	Jerry Lee Hogue	White	47	M	11-Mar-1998	Tarrant	Jane Markham	George W. Bush
148	Joseph John Cannon	White	38	M	22-Apr-1998	Bexar	Anne Walsh	George W. Bush
149	Lesley Lee Gosch	White	42	M	24-Apr-1998	Victoria	Rebecca Jo Patton	George W. Bush
150	Frank Basil McFarland	White	34	M	29-Apr-1998	Tarrant	Terri Lynn Hokanson	George W. Bush
151	Robert Anthony Carter	Black	34	M	18-May-1998	Harris	Sylvia Reyes	George W. Bush
152	Pedro Cruz Muniz	Hispanic	41	M	19-May-1998	Williamson	Janis Carol Bickham	George W. Bush
153	Clifford Holt Boggess	White	32	M	11-Jun-1998	Clay	Ray Vance Hazelwood and Moses Frank Collier	George W. Bush
154	Johnny Dean Pyles	White	40	M	15-Jun-1998	Dallas	Dallas County Deputy Sheriff Ray Edward Kovar	George W. Bush
155	Leopoldo Narvaiz Jr.	Hispanic	30	M	26-Jun-1998	Bexar	4 murder victims (Note: The 4 victims were: Shannon Mann, Jennifer Mann, Ernest Mann, and Martha Mann.)	George W. Bush
156	Genaro Ruiz Camacho Jr.	Hispanic	43	M	26-Aug-1998	Dallas	David Wilburn	George W. Bush
157	Delbert Boyd Teague Jr.	White	35	M	09-Sep-1998	Tarrant	Kevin Allen	George W. Bush
158	David Allen Castillo	Hispanic	34	M	23-Sep-1998	Hidalgo	Clarencio Champion	George W. Bush
159	Javier Cruz	Hispanic	41	M	01-Oct-1998	Bexar	Menard Neal and James Ryan	George W. Bush
160	Jonathan Wayne Nobles	White	37	M	07-Oct-1998	Travis	Mitzi Johnson and Kelly Farquhar	George W. Bush
161	Kenneth Allen McDuff	White	52	M	17-Nov-1998	Harris (Note: On a change of venue from McLennan.)	Melissa Ann Northrup (Note: McDuff has been linked to at least 8 other murders but was ultimately executed for the Northrup murder. He was previously on death row for the murders of Edna Sullivan, Robert Brand and Johnny Dunham. His original death sentence was commuted to life and was on parole when he killed Northrup.)	George W. Bush
162	Daniel Lee Corwin	White	40	M	07-Dec-1998	Montgomery	Alice Martin, Debra Ewing, and Mary Risinger	George W. Bush
163	Jeff J. Emery	White	39	M	08-Dec-1998	Brazos	LaShan Muhlinghaus	George W. Bush
164	James Ronald Meanes	Black	42	M	15-Dec-1998	Harris	Oliver Flores	George W. Bush
1999 – 35 executions								George W. Bush
165	John Glenn Moody	White	46	M	05-Jan-1999	Taylor	Maureen Louis Maulden	George W. Bush
166	Troy Dale Farris	White	36	M	13-Jan-1999	Tarrant	Tarrant County Deputy Sheriff Clark Rosenbalm Jr.	George W. Bush
167	Martin Sauceda Vega	Hispanic	52	M	26-Jan-1999	Caldwell	James William Mims	George W. Bush
168	Jorge "George" Cordova	Hispanic	39	M	10-Feb-1999	Bexar	Jose Hernandez	George W. Bush
169	Danny Lee Barber	White	43	M	11-Feb-1999	Dallas	Janice Louis Ingram (Note: Barber was convicted of murdering Raymond Curly, Mercedes Mendez and Mary Caperton.)	George W. Bush
170	Andrew Flores Cantu	Hispanic	30	M	16-Feb-1999	Taylor	Helen Summers, Mandell Eugene Summers, and Billy Mack Summers	George W. Bush
171	Norman Evans Green	Black	38	M	24-Feb-1999	Bexar	Timothy Adams	George W. Bush
172	Charles Henry Rector	Black	44	M	26-Mar-1999	Travis	Carolyn Kay Davis	George W. Bush
173	Robert Excell White	White	61	M	30-Mar-1999	Collin	Preston Broyles, Gary Coker, and Billy St. John	George W. Bush
174	Aaron Christopher Foust	White	26	M	28-Apr-1999	Tarrant	David Ward	George W. Bush
175	Jose Eligio de la Cruz	Hispanic	31	M	04-May-1999	Nueces	Domingo Rosas	George W. Bush
176	Clydell Coleman	Black	62	M	05-May-1999	McLennan	Leetisha Joe	George W. Bush
177	William Hamilton Little	White	38	M	01-Jun-1999	Liberty	Marilyn Peter	George W. Bush
178	Joseph Stanley Faulder	White	61	M	17-Jun-1999	Gregg	Inez Phillips	George W. Bush
179	Charles Daniel Tuttle	White	35	M	01-Jul-1999	Smith	Cathy Harris	George W. Bush
180	Tyrone Leroy Fuller	Black	35	M	07-Jul-1999	Grayson	Andrea Lea Duke	George W. Bush
181	Ricky Don Blackmon	White	41	M	04-Aug-1999	Shelby	Carl Rinkle	George W. Bush
182	Charles Anthony Boyd	Black	39	M	05-Aug-1999	Dallas	Mary Mulligan	George W. Bush
183	Kenneth Dwayne Dunn	Black	39	M	10-Aug-1999	Harris	Madeline Peters	George W. Bush
184	James Otto Earhart	White	56	M	11-Aug-1999	Lee	Kandy Janell Kirtland	George W. Bush
185	Joseph Mario Trevino Jr.	Hispanic	37	M	18-Aug-1999	Tarrant	Blanche Miller	George W. Bush
186	Raymond James Jones	Black	39	M	01-Sep-1999	Jefferson	Su Van Dang	George W. Bush
187	Willis Jay Barnes	Black	51	M	10-Sep-1999	Harris	Helen Grab	George W. Bush
188	William Prince Davis	Black	42	M	14-Sep-1999	Harris	Richard Lang	George W. Bush
189	Richard Wayne Smith	White	43	M	21-Sep-1999	Harris	Karen Birky	George W. Bush
190	Alvin Wayne Crane	White	41	M	12-Oct-1999	Denton	Ochiltree County Deputy Sheriff Melvin Drum	George W. Bush
191	Jerry Walter McFadden	White	51	M	14-Oct-1999	Upshur	Suzanne Denise Harrison, Bryan Boone and Gena Turner	George W. Bush
192	Domingo Cantu Jr.	Hispanic	31	M	28-Oct-1999	Dallas	Suda Eller Jones	George W. Bush
193	Desmond Domnique Jennings	Black	28	M	16-Nov-1999	Tarrant	Wonda Matthews and Sylvester Walton	George W. Bush
194	John Michael Lamb	White	42	M	17-Nov-1999	Hunt	Jerry Chafin	George W. Bush
195	Jose Angel Gutierrez	Hispanic	39	M	18-Nov-1999	Brazos	Dorothy McNew	George W. Bush
196	David Martin Long	White	46	M	08-Dec-1999	Dallas	Donna Sue Jester, Dalpha Lorene Jester, and Laura Lee Owens	George W. Bush
197	James Lee Beathard	White	42	M	09-Dec-1999	Trinity	Gene Hathorn, Linda Sue Hathorn, and Marcus Hathorn	George W. Bush
198	Robert Ronald Atworth	White	30	M	14-Dec-1999	Dallas	Thomas Carlson	George W. Bush
199	Samuel "Sammie" Felder Jr.	Black	54	M	15-Dec-1999	Harris	James Hanks	George W. Bush
Source: List of executed offenders by the TDCJ since 1982.

Preceded by List of people executed in Texas, 1982–1989	Lists of people executed in Texas	Succeeded by List of people executed in Texas, 2000–2009

== See also ==
- Capital punishment in Texas
