= Danny Barber (serial killer) =

Executed American serial killer

- Barber's mugshot in 1980
- Born: May 8, 1955; Torrance, California, U.S.
- Died: February 11, 1999 (aged 43); Huntsville Unit, Texas, U.S.
- Status: Executed by lethal injection
- Convictions: Capital murder Murder (3 counts); Burglary
- Penalty: Death

Details
- Victims: 4
- Span of crimes: June 18, 1978 – April 21, 1980
- Country: United States
- State: Texas
- Date apprehended: May 4, 1980

Danny Lee Barber (May 8, 1955 – February 11, 1999) was an American serial killer, necrophile, and burglar who murdered four people around Dallas County, Texas, between June 1978 and April 1980. He was convicted of three of the murders, sentenced to death for one of them, and executed by lethal injection in 1999.

== Biography ==
On October 8, 1979, in Balch Springs, Barber entered the home of 50-year-old Janice Ingram, carrying a piece of pipe he had picked up in her backyard. Intending to break through a window and burglarize the house, he instead discovered an open door and walked in on a startled Ingram, who began to scream. When she would not stop, Barber bludgeoned her around the head and face with the pipe and stabbed her in the throat, killing her. Ingram's naked body lay undiscovered for over two weeks before being found on October 26 by her mother Ruth Clowers and brother Roy Clowers. Both Janice Ingram and Ruth Clowers were already known to Barber, who had previously done manual work on the grounds of their properties.

On May 4, 1980, Barber was arrested and imprisoned for breaking into a flea market. Whilst incarcerated, he confessed to Ingram's murder and that of three others in Dallas County: 39-year-old Mary Caperton on April 21, 1980; Raymond Curly on June 18, 1978; and Mercedes Mendez (aka Mercy Mendez), a 48-year-old woman who was beaten, sexually molested and shot three times in the head on January 17, 1979, before being dumped in a wooded area near Mesquite. Barber claimed to have engaged in sexual activity with two of the corpses.

In August 1980, Barber was sentenced to death for the slaying of Janice Ingram and life imprisonment for two other murders. His execution was scheduled for January 2, 1988, and he was within one hour of it being carried out when United States Supreme Court justice Byron White issued a stay on the grounds of a technicality raised by Barber's legal team. A second execution date was subsequently set after a decision by U.S. District Judge Sam Sparks.

Barber was executed by lethal injection in the Huntsville Unit on Thursday, February 11, 1999. Barber's last words were:

Hello, Ms. Ingram, it is good to see you. I said I could talk but I don't think I am gonna be able to. I heard one of your nieces had some angry words. I didn't have anything to do with the stay. I spent the last twenty years waiting to figure out what's going on. I pray that you get over it and that's the only thing I can think to say. I'm regretful for what I done, but I'm a different person from that time. If you could get to know me over the years, you could have seen it. I've got some people over here that believes that. I want to talk to my friends over here for a second. Well, it's good to see you guys. Look after Mary Lynn for me. Like I said, I've called my mother already, so she knows. Goodbye.

He is buried at Captain Joe Byrd Cemetery.

== See also ==
- List of people executed in Texas, 1990–1999
- List of people executed in the United States in 1999
- List of serial killers in the United States
