= James Demouchette =

American murderer executed in Texas

- Born: May 20, 1955; San Antonio, Texas, U.S.
- Died: September 22, 1992 (aged 37); Huntsville Unit, Huntsville, Texas, U.S.
- Cause of death: Execution by lethal injection
- Other name: "Doom"
- Convictions: Capital murder Murder; Burglary; Larceny
- Penalty: Death

Details
- Victims: 4 killed 6 wounded (including 1 raped)
- Span of crimes: 1976–1988
- Country: United States
- State: Texas
- Weapons: .380 revolver homemade knife
- Date apprehended: October 18, 1976

James Demouchette (May 20, 1955 – September 22, 1992) was an American serial killer who was convicted and sentenced to death in Texas for the double-murder of two Pizza Hut clerks during a robbery in Houston in 1976. He later gained infamy as the "Meanest Man on Death Row" for his deviant behavior, which began when he fatally stabbed another inmate with a homemade knife. By the time of his execution in 1992, his case had attracted particular media attention. Because he continued to terrorize fellow inmates and prison guards alike until his execution in 1992, he has been described as a poster boy for capital punishment.

== Early life ==
James Demouchette was born in San Antonio in 1955. As a child, he was known to set fires and kill stray dogs and cats. He failed elementary school multiple times due to his deviant behavior, for such he served time at a state school for juvenile delinquencies. He also spent time in custody for killing another boy during his youth and for larceny and burglary in adulthood.

== Criminal offenses ==
=== 1977 murder convictions ===
On October 17, 1976, James Demouchette and his younger brother, 18-year-old Christopher Demouchette, entered a Pizza Hut restaurant in Houston, where Geoff Hambrick was working as the restaurant manager, along with 19-year-old Scott Sorrell working as assistant manager, and Scott's roommate 22-year-old Robert “Chuck” White. Hambrick told the two to leave because it was close to closing time. However, instead of leaving, James pulled out a 380. Caliber revolver and started shooting. During the shooting, both Sorrell and White were shot dead, while Hambrick was shot in the head, but was alive and pretended to play dead. Both brothers then ransacked the back office and left the restaurant with stolen change.

The Demouchette brothers were arrested not long after, and Hambrick identified and testified against the brothers. James was convicted of capital murder and sentenced to death in 1977, while Christopher was spared execution and instead given a life sentence. He died on August 20, 2018, at the age of 60.

=== Death row ===
In 1981, James' sentence was overturned by the Texas Court of Criminal Appeals, arguing that Demouchette had not been told his right to remain silent prior to his clemency exam. In the new trial, he was again sentenced to death in April 1983.

In April 1982, Demouchette beat and raped a fellow inmate at the Harris County Jail. The victim, Anthony Graves, testified against him at his resentencing hearing. Graves recounted how a smiling Demouchette had confronted him in the jail shower, said, "Welcome to Demouchette's house," and then beat and raped him.

In August 1983, Demouchette murdered fellow inmate Johnny E. Swift, whom he stabbed 27 times with a homemade knife while inside a prison dayroom. For this, Demouchette was given an additional life sentence, with his death sentences upheld. Months later, he beat and stabbed two other inmates, both of whom survived.

Demouchette also started setting fires in his cell, destroying TVs and at one point raped a cellmate. Following this, media attention surrounding the case began to increase, and Demouchette was nicknamed "The Meanest Man on Death Row". On January 6, 1988, Demouchette attacked corrections officers Charles Agee, 26, Scott Stoughton, 24, and Roger Barkin, 22, with a homemade knife after they attempted to search his cell for weapons. None of the officers were seriously injured, but Agee sustained three puncture wounds to the right thigh.

Prison officials started isolating Demouchette from other death row inmates and placed him under heavy guard when taking to and from court. Nevertheless, he continued to find other ways to attack people. In February 1992, less than a year before his execution, Demouchette slashed the chest of a guard who was delivering food to his cell.

== Execution ==
With his execution fast approaching, Demouchette's lawyers attempted to get the Supreme Court to review the case, but they ultimately did not decide to step in. On September 22, 1992, Demouchette was executed by lethal injection, becoming the 10th inmate executed in Texas in 1992. He offered no last words. In total, he spent 15 years on death row.

He is buried at Captain Joe Byrd Cemetery.

== See also ==
- Capital punishment in Texas
- Capital punishment in the United States
- List of people executed by lethal injection
- List of people executed in Texas, 1990–1999
- List of people executed in the United States in 1992

== Bibliography ==
- Jermnine Demouchette (October 15, 2008). James Demouchette vs. the State of Texas. Wheatmark. ISBN 9781604941623.
