= Julia Lashae =

American actress and singer (born 1969)

- Born: July 22, 1969 (age 57); Austin, Texas, U.S.
- Education: American Musical and Dramatic Academy
- Occupation: Actress
- Years active: 1998–present

Julia Lashae (born Julia Louise Lawshae; July 22, 1969) is an American actress and singer. Her father and mother raised Lashae and her four siblings "infused with the sounds of music".

== Filmography ==
Film
Year	Title	Role	Notes
2000	Lush	Hooker	
2000	Stalled	Mrs. Ward	
2001	The Rising Place	USO Crooner	
2001	Tempted	Heather	
2002	Love Liza	Breakfast Woman	
2003	The Life of David Gale	New Homeowner	
2005	Because of Winn-Dixie (film)	SPCA Officer	
2005	Campus Confidential	Food Server	
2006	Last Holiday (2006 film)	HMO Administrator	
2006	Mammoth (2006 film)	Tour Guide	
2006	Déjà Vu (2006 film)	Eyewitness / Survivor	
2010	Father of Invention	Lily's Mother	
2010	My Own Love Song	Suzie	
2014	The Best of Me (film)	Clara	
2016	Johnny Frank Garrett's Last Word	Juror #3	

== Discography ==
- 2003 Introducing... Julia LaShae, CD
- 2009 Eadem Mutato Resurgo, CD
