= Jerry Walter McFadden =

Executed American serial killer

- Mugshot of McFadden c. 1986
- Born: Gerald Walter McFadden; March 21, 1948; Haskell County, Texas, U.S.
- Died: October 14, 1999 (aged 51); Huntsville Unit, Texas, U.S.
- Other name: "The Animal"
- Children: 2
- Status: Executed by lethal injection
- Conviction: Capital murder
- Penalty: Death

Details
- Victims: 4 confirmed
- Span of crimes: 1972–1986
- Country: United States
- States: Oregon; Texas

Gerald "Jerry" Walter McFadden (March 21, 1948 – October 14, 1999), who called himself The Animal, was an American serial killer and sex offender who was convicted of the May 1986 murders of two women and one man in Smith County, Texas. He fled from jail shortly after his arrest, leading to one of the largest man-hunts in Texas history that came to an end in July of that year. He was later sentenced to death and executed in 1999. Years after his execution, he was found to have perpetrated an earlier 1979 murder in Oregon through DNA evidence, and authorities have since speculated he could have committed other killings.

== Early life ==
Gerald Walter McFadden was born on March 21, 1948, in Haskell County, Texas.

== Criminal life ==
On May 4, 1986, McFadden kidnapped 20-year-old Gena Turner, 19-year-old Bryan Boone, and 18-year-old Suzanne Harrison as they took a trip to Lake Hawkins north of Tyler, Texas. McFadden raped and strangled Harrison and dumped her body in a park about 25 miles (40 km) from Lake Hawkins. She was found the next day. He was arrested on May 6, after a police report from a couple he had attacked by the lake on the day of the murder. Three days later, the bodies of Boone and Turner were discovered, with gunshot wounds being the cause of death.

McFadden had been convicted of rape three times between 1972 and 1978, but never had to serve his full sentence. He was released on parole in July 1985. There were several witnesses who had seen McFadden close to the scene of the crime on the day of the killings. Ammunition found in his possession was identified as the same ammunition used in the killings of Boone and Turner. DNA evidence was collected from the bodies at this time.

On July 9, 1986, he overcame Kenneth Mayfield, a jailer, and escaped from the jail in Upshur County with Rosalie Williams, another guard, as a hostage. He was arrested two days later. In August 1986, he was sentenced to life imprisonment for the escape.

In July 1987, McFadden was sentenced to death for the murder of 18-year-old Suzanne Harrison, 20-year-old Gena Turner and 19-year-old Bryan Boone. The Texas Appeals Court affirmed the conviction and sentence in November 1993. In October 1999, he was executed in the Huntsville Unit by lethal injection.

In January 2019, McFadden was linked by DNA via GEDmatch to the July 24, 1979, murder of 20-year-old Anna Marie Hlavka in Portland, Oregon. Anna had been found dead by her sister inside her apartment. Police said Hlavka had been sexually assaulted and strangled with the electric cord from her clock radio.

== See also ==
- List of people executed in Texas, 1990–1999
- List of people executed in the United States in 1999
- List of serial killers in the United States
- Parabon NanoLabs
