= 1983 Malibu Grand Prix murders =

Mass murder in Texas, U.S.

- Date: July 1, 1983
- Location: Houston, Texas, U.S.
- Type: Armed robbery, mass murder by stabbing
- Deaths: Roddy Harris, 22; Arnold Pequeno, 19; Joerene Pequeno, 18; Anil Varughese, 18
- Convicted: Kenneth Ray Ransom, 20; Richard James Wilkerson, 19; James Edward Randle, 16
- Verdict: Guilty
- Convictions: Capital murder (all 3)
- Sentence: Ransom; Death; Wilkerson; Death; Randle; Life imprisonment

On July 1, 1983, at the Malibu Grand Prix in Houston, Texas, three robbers – Kenneth Ray Ransom (May 15, 1963 – October 28, 1997), James Edward Randle (also spelled James Edward Randall; born January 14, 1967) and Richard James Wilkerson (April 18, 1964 – August 31, 1993) – robbed and fatally stabbed four of the center's workers: the center’s manager, 18-year-old Anil Varughese; 22-year-old Roddy Harris; and two brothers, Joerene and Arnold Pequeno, aged 18 and 19, respectively. The assailants escaped with approximately $2,000.

All three men were arrested and charged with capital murder. Randle, who was 16 years old at the time of the crime and a cousin of Wilkerson, was spared the death penalty and instead sentenced to life in prison. On the other hand, both Wilkerson and Ransom were found guilty of capital murder — Wilkerson for the murder of Anil Varughese and Ransom for the murder of Arnold Pequeno — and were sentenced to death. Wilkerson was executed on August 31, 1993, while Ransom was put to death four years later on October 28, 1997. Both executions were carried out by lethal injection at the Huntsville Unit.

== Murders ==
On June 30, 1983, a group of three armed robbers barged into the Malibu Grand Prix, a popular amusement center in southwest Houston, Texas, where they perpetuated a robbery that led to the fatal stabbing of four workers at the center.

Before the murders, 19-year-old Richard James Wilkerson had been employed at the Malibu Grand Prix but was fired shortly beforehand. On the day of the killings, after the arcade center closed for the day, Wilkerson returned to his former workplace armed with knives, accompanied by two accomplices — his 16-year-old cousin, James Edward Randle, and 20-year-old Kenneth Ray Ransom. While both Ransom and Randle remained outside of the building, Wilkerson entered the manager's office and held the 18-year-old manager Anil Varughese (also his former supervisor) at knifepoint, forcing him to open the safe. Upon doing so, Varughese was stabbed 42 times by Wilkerson and he died as a result of the attack, which Wilkerson initiated despite Varughese's plea for mercy and promise to help Wilkerson get back his job. Wilkerson had beforehand planned to rob his former workplace and if necessary, silence any witnesses.

Varughese was not the sole employee to be present at the center itself. Three of Varughese's co-workers – 22-year-old Roddy Harris, 19-year-old Arnold Pequeno, and his 18-year-old brother Joerene Pequeno – were also at the workplace at the time of the robbery. The Pequeno brothers and Harris were all stabbed to death by Randle and Ransom. After murdering the four, the robbery trio stole about $2,000 from the safe of Varughese's office and departed the center, and Wilkerson also cashed his paycheck, which he received from Varughese prior to the manager's fatal stabbing.

At the time of their deaths, Varughese was a pre-medical student at the Houston Baptist University, while Harris majored in music at the same university as Varughese. The Pequeno brothers were survived by their 21-year-old eldest brother and parents, and the pair's mother only received news of her two younger sons' murders eight days later upon her return from her vacation in Mexico.

== Investigations and arrests ==
At around 8am on July 1, 1983, hours after the murders, the body of Anil Varughese was discovered at his office; an autopsy report revealed that Varughese sustained five knife wounds on the chest and three on the abdomen. The other three victims, the Pequeno brothers and Harris, were found inside the bathroom of the arcade center. Based on the autopsy findings, Arnold was stabbed 22 times and he had fatal neck wounds, including a severed jugular vein, while Joerene sustained 11 stab wounds and similarly died from a severed jugular vein. Harris died as a result of seven stab wounds to the chest, some of which likely penetrated the heart and lungs.

On July 3, 1983, two of the killers, James Randle and Richard Wilkerson, were arrested and taken into custody for the murders, after Randle's mother reportedly told the police about her overhearing her son's plan to commit robbery and murder. The final suspect, Kenneth Ray Ransom, remained at large and was placed on the police's wanted list for charges of capital murder, an offence that carries the death penalty under Texas state law. Reportedly, both Wilkerson and Randle, who were charged with capital murder, confessed to robbing and murdering the four victims during police interrogations, and a detective described the confessions as "business-like" and commented that the pair showed no remorse throughout the probe into the killings, which were confirmed to be premeditated. The state prosecution also applied to the courts to have Randle tried as an adult for the homicides. Subsequently, another media report revealed that both Wilkerson and Randle pinned the blame wholly on Ransom, with the former denying that he ever stabbed the victims.

On July 5, 1983, four days after the Malibu Grand Prix murders, Ransom, accompanied by a lawyer, surrendered himself to the police and he was therefore charged with capital murder. Prior to his involvement in the murders, Ransom was released since October 1982 after serving 19 months out of a four-year sentence for auto theft, and he was also previously convicted in 1980 of burglary, and paroled in 1981 in midst of serving a two-year jail term.

== Trial proceedings ==
Wilkerson

On January 6, 1984, 19-year-old Richard James Wilkerson was found guilty of capital murder in the case of Anil Varughese's death, and he was the first out of the trio to be convicted for his part in the Malibu Grand Prix killings.

On January 7, 1984, the jury unanimously recommended the death penalty for Wilkerson. Before the judge formally passed sentence on him, Wilkerson publicly apologize in court and stated he was very sorry for what happened, but Jose Pequeno, the father of the murdered Pequeno brothers, responded and told a paper that he did not buy Wilkerson's apology, stating that Wilkerson was not truly sorry for murdering his two younger sons, and added that he never felt sorry towards Wilkerson for his plight.

Randle

On March 9, 1984, 17-year-old James Edward Randle was the second offender of the case to be convicted of capital murder in the case of Arnold Pequeno's death. After a jury convicted him, Randle was sentenced to life imprisonment with the possibility of parole after 20 years. Due to the fact that Randle was 16 and still under the age of 18 at the time of the offences, he was spared the death sentence.

Ransom

On June 14, 1984, a jury convicted 21-year-old Kenneth Ray Ransom of the capital murder of Arnold Pequeno, therefore making Ransom the third and final perpetrator to be convicted in this case.

On June 15, 1984, the jury deliberated for more than four hours before deciding on capital punishment for Ransom, who became the second perpetrator to be condemned to death row for the Malibu Grand Prix murders.

== Execution of Wilkerson (1993) ==
=== Appeals ===
On May 14, 1986, Richard Wilkerson's direct appeal against his death sentence was denied by the Texas Court of Criminal Appeals.

On October 16, 1989, Wilkerson's appeal was rejected by the U.S. Supreme Court.

On January 6, 1992, the 5th Circuit Court of Appeals dismissed Wilkerson's appeal.

=== Execution ===
Originally, Wilkerson was scheduled to be executed on December 11, 1990, but U.S. District Judge Filemon Vela granted Wilkerson a stay of execution in late November 1990. Later, the execution date was re-scheduled on August 15, 1991, but the 5th Circuit Court of Appeals granted Wilkerson a stay of execution hours before it was supposed to be carried out.

Two years later, Wilkerson's death sentence was re-scheduled to be carried out on August 31, 1993. In response, Wilkerson filed an appeal to delay his execution, but the Texas Court of Criminal Appeals rejected the motion. As a last resort to avoid execution, Wilkerson further appealed to the U.S. Supreme Court for a stay, but the appeal was denied. Wilkerson's lawyers argued that Wilkerson, who was African-American, was unfairly convicted due to racial bias and alleged that African-American candidates were excluded during the jury selection phase of Wilkerson's trial, but the arguments were not accepted.

On August 31, 1993, shortly after midnight, 29-year-old Richard James Wilkerson was put to death by lethal injection at the Huntsville Unit. On that same date, Kenneth DeShields was executed in Delaware for the August 1984 murder of Elizabeth Reed, a Democratic committeewoman. Wilkerson said in his final statement, "I don't hate nobody. What I did was wrong. I hope everyone will be satisfied with what's about to happen."

== Execution of Ransom (1997) ==
While he was incarcerated on death row at the Ellis Unit, Kenneth Ransom appealed to the Texas Court of Criminal Appeals against his death sentence, but it was dismissed on June 14, 1989. The U.S. Supreme Court also rejected his appeal in 1990.

More than 13 years after the Malibu Grand Prix murders, Ransom's death warrant was finalised, and his execution was scheduled on October 28, 1997. Ransom appealed to stay his execution, but the 5th Circuit Court of Appeals rejected his appeal on October 21, 1997.

On October 28, 1997, 34-year-old Kenneth Ray Ransom was put to death by lethal injection at the Huntsville Unit. Ransom reportedly proclaimed his innocence in his last statement, and hoped his death could bring about the abolition of the death penalty. Ransom's mother was reportedly present at the time of her son's execution, and she was said to be devastated and collapsed while crying in the execution chamber.

Ransom was the 32nd person to be executed in Texas that same year, marking a record year for executions in the state.

== Aftermath ==
The 1983 Malibu Grand Prix murders were known to be one of Houston's most gruesome and worst mass murders to occur in Texas state history.

In 2023, 40 years after the slayings, true crime series, titled The Evidence Room, re-enacted the Malibu Grand Prix killings, and it aired as the 15th episode of the show's third season.

A female cousin of Richard Wilkerson, one of the executed killers, agreed to an interview 40 years after the killings. The cousin, who was given the alias "Jane Doe", stated that she and the family were genuinely shocked to hear that Wilkerson, whom they knew to be a quiet and shy person with a good heart, was responsible for such brutal murders, and Jane Doe also acknowledged her cousin's guilt despite finding the violent crimes being out of character on Wilkerson's part.

== See also ==
- Capital punishment in Texas
- List of people executed in Texas, 1990–1999
- List of people executed in the United States in 1993
- List of people executed in the United States in 1997
