= Alan Willett =

Alan Willett (June 27, 1947 – September 8, 1999) was executed at age 52 for the 1993 murders of his 13-year-old son, Eric, and his mentally disabled brother, Roger Willett, in Johnson County, Arkansas. Willett's daughter Ruby Ann Willett and another son, Jonathan, survived the attack.

== Murders ==
Alan Willett was sentenced to death for convictions in the 1993 Johnson County killings of his 13-year-old son, Eric, and his mentally disabled brother, Roger. Alan Willett's daughter and another son survived the attack. Willett said he wanted to die and waived his right to post-conviction remedies.

== Execution ==
Willett's last meal was beef jerky, barbecue-flavored potato chips, onion dip, garlic dip, buttered popcorn, and Pepsi.

Mark Gardner was also executed by the state of Arkansas on the same day for the unrelated murders of Joe Joyce, Martha Joyce, and Sara McCurdy. Gardner was executed first because he had a lower inmate number (SK901) than Willett (SK930). The injection of a lethal drug was administered to Willett at 9:02 p.m. CDT, and he was pronounced dead at 9:16.

Willett made no last statement.

Willett was the 4th condemned inmate to be put to death in 1999 in Arkansas and the 21st person executed by the state of Arkansas since Furman v. Georgia, 408 U.S. 238 (1972), after new capital punishment laws were passed in Arkansas and that came into force on March 23, 1973.

He was also the 570th person executed overall since the United States resumed executions on January 17, 1977.

== See also ==
- Capital punishment in Arkansas
- Capital punishment in the United States
- List of people executed in Arkansas
- List of people executed in the United States in 1999

Executions carried out in Arkansas
Preceded by Mark Gardner September 8, 1999	Alan Willett; September 8, 1999	Succeeded by Christina Marie Riggs May 2, 2000
Executions carried out in the United States
Preceded by Mark Gardner – Arkansas September 8, 1999	Alan Willett – Arkansas; September 8, 1999	Succeeded by Willis Barnes – Texas September 10, 1999
