= Marion Albert Pruett =

Executed American serial killer (1949–1999)

- Pruett on August 6, 1980
- Born: October 4, 1949; Gastonia, North Carolina, U.S.
- Died: April 12, 1999 (aged 49); Cummins Unit, Arkansas, U.S.
- Status: Executed by lethal injection
- Motive: Acquisitive crimes related to illegal drug use
- Convictions: Arkansas; Capital murder (September 9, 1982); Mississippi; Capital murder New Mexico; First degree murder Colorado; First degree murder (2 counts)
- Penalty: Death (Arkansas and Mississippi, sentence in Mississippi reduced to life); 3 life sentences (New Mexico and Colorado)

Details
- Span of crimes: March 2 – October 12, 1981
- States: New Mexico, Mississippi, Colorado, Arkansas
- Targets: Common law spouse, bank teller, store clerks
- Killed: 5+
- Weapons: Hammer, .38 caliber revolver
- Date apprehended: October 17, 1981

Marion Albert Pruett (October 4, 1949 – April 12, 1999) was an American serial killer.

== Witness Protection Program ==
In 1979, Pruett was given $800, a new name (Charles "Sonny" Pearson), and placed in the United States Federal Witness Protection Program after testifying about a federal prison slaying in Atlanta, Georgia. He then began his crime spree under his alias. Pruett later claimed that he had perpetrated the prison murder, contradicting his previous testimony for which he had received federal protection.

Pruett killed Peggy Lowe after he kidnapped her on September 17, 1981, while robbing the Metrocenter Branch of Unifirst Bank (later Trustmark National Bank) in Jackson, Mississippi where she worked. He also killed Bobbie Jean Robertson, a convenience store clerk in Fort Smith, Arkansas; and Anthony Taitt and James Balderson, two convenience store clerks in Colorado. He received the death penalty for Lowe's murder, two more life sentences for the murders in Colorado, and the death penalty for Robertson's murder. In February 1988, Pruett's death sentence for Lowe's murder was reduced to life.

On trial in New Mexico for the March 2, 1981, murder of his common-law wife, Pamela Sue Barker (aka Michelle Lynn Pearson), Pruett admitted he had robbed her in order to support a $4,000 a week cocaine habit, but denied that he killed Barker, who was beaten to death, then set on fire. He was convicted, and given a third life sentence. From death row, he asked a Mississippi newspaper to pay him $20,000 to disclose the location of Barker's engagement ring, and offered to reveal the location of a Florida victim's body in exchange for a paid appearance on Geraldo.

== Execution ==
His last meal consisted of a stuffed crust pizza from Pizza Hut, four Burger King Whoppers, a large order of French fries, three two-liter bottles of Pepsi, a bucket of ice, a bottle of ketchup, salt, fried eggplant, fried squash, fried okra, and a pecan pie. In an interview prior to his execution date, Pruett said he was going to share his last meal with another inmate who was going to be executed the same day. He went on to say he originally wanted to have a roast duck for his last meal, but it was rejected because the prison would not cook it.

Pruett was executed by lethal injection on April 12, 1999, being pronounced dead at 9:09 p.m. He had been given a choice between lethal injection and electrocution, because Robertson was murdered in 1981, before Arkansas changed execution methods. Pruett was the 19th person executed by Arkansas since Furman v. Georgia.

== Victims ==
- Pamela Sue Barker – April, 1981, Rio Rancho
- Peggy Lowe – September 17, 1981, Jackson
- Bobbie Jean Robertson – October 12, 1981, Fort Smith
- James R. Balderson – October 16, 1981, Fort Collins
- Anthony Taitt – October 16, 1981, Loveland

== See also ==
- Capital punishment in Arkansas
- Capital punishment in the United States
- List of people executed in Arkansas
- List of people executed in the United States in 1999
- List of serial killers in the United States

Executions carried out in Arkansas
Preceded by Johnie Cox February 16, 1999	Marion Albert Pruett; April 12, 1999	Succeeded by Mark Gardner September 8, 1999
Executions carried out in the United States
Preceded by Alvaro Calambro – Nevada April 5, 1999	Marion Albert Pruett – Arkansas; April 12, 1999	Succeeded by Carl Chichester – Virginia April 13, 1999
