= Desmond Domnique Jennings =

Executed American serial killer

- Born: October 4, 1971; Fort Worth, Texas, U.S.
- Died: November 16, 1999 (aged 28); Huntsville Unit, Texas, U.S.
- Status: Executed by lethal injection
- Motive: Robbery; Witness elimination
- Conviction: Capital murder (2 counts)
- Penalty: Death

Details
- Victims: 5–20
- Span of crimes: October – December 1993
- Country: United States
- State: Texas
- Weapon: Pistol
- Date apprehended: January 20, 1994

Desmond Domnique Jennings (October 4, 1971 – November 16, 1999) was an American serial killer who killed at least five people in drug-related robberies in Fort Worth, Texas in 1993. While authorities only conclusively proved his guilt in five murders, they suspected him in as many as twenty.

Jennings was executed in 1999. During his execution, he had to be forcibly taken to the death chamber. It was the first time in modern Texas history that prison officials had to forcibly move a death row inmate due to them refusing to cooperate.

== Early adult life ==
Little is known about Jennings' life prior to the murders. He was born on October 4, 1971, in Fort Worth and grew up in a middle-class family. He had an older brother, Didrail.

Prior to the murders, Jennings worked as a nurse's aide.

== Murders ==
On October 25, 1993, Jennings, 22-year-old John H. Freeman and Robert Anderson donned ski masks and broke into a drug house on 3345 Eastland Street in Fort Worth, where they encountered 43-year-old Larry Eugene Wilson, a fleet service worker for American Airlines who had gone there to buy marijuana. Jennings opened fire and shot Wilson in the abdomen, after which he and his accomplices stole some money and fled. Wilson was rushed to the John Peter Smith Hospital, where he succumbed to his injuries on the following day. According to witnesses present at the shooting, he had only been there for a few minutes before the gunmen entered and shot him.

On December 24, 1993, Jennings and Freeman went to another crack house on 5000 Sunshine Drive. Upon entering, they opened fire on the two inhabitants – 28-year-old Dino Andre Beasley and his girlfriend, 31-year-old Charlotte Dickerson – who were both in the kitchen. The pair were gravely wounded but not killed outright, after which Jennings and Freeman fled the scene. Dickerson managed to call the police and inform them that she had been shot, after which a unit was dispatched to transport her and Beasley to the John Peter Smith Hospital. Beasley succumbed to his injuries that same day, while Dickerson died during a surgery two days later, without providing any possible clues to the killers' identities.

On December 27, 1993, Jennings and Freeman entered a house in Fort Worth. Inside, when Sylvester Walton, 44, asked the two what they wanted, Jennings shot him in the face, killing him. As they moved further into the house, they saw Wonda Matthews, 27, rising up on a bed. Jennings shot her in the head. Jennings then returned to Walton and checked his body, stealing a pouch. As Jennings and Freeman were leaving the house, Jennings heard Matthews moaning, so he returned and shot her a second time.

== Arrests ==
In January 1994, Fort Worth authorities issued arrest warrants for Jennings and Freeman after identifying them as the primary suspects in the murders. This stemmed from an earlier arrest concerning Freeman, who had been detained for drug possession on January 3. While police were searching his car, they found a .32-caliber automatic handgun that, when examined, was linked to the murders of Beasley, Walton and Matthews.

In an attempt to apprehend them quickly, they reached to the public via the media and the local CrimeStoppers branch in order to locate and arrest the two fugitives. On January 20, Jennings voluntarily surrendered to the police in Forest Hill after learning that he was sought for the murder of Larry Wilson.

On January 28, Freeman was tracked down to a house on Stephenson Street in Fort Worth, after a confidential informant overheard him discussing some of the murders near the Dunbar High School. After refusing to answer the door and lying about his identity, he was eventually arrested by the police officers.

=== Trial and sentence ===
Following his arrest, Jennings was charged with all five of the murders, to which he pleaded not guilty. Despite facing the possibility of the death penalty, he refused a plea deal to serve three life sentences with a chance of parole after 30 years. His trial began on July 13, 1995.

The prosecution's case against Jennings and Freeman was mostly circumstantial, as it relied on the testimony of several people who saw Jennings exiting some of the victims' houses with blood splatters on his shoes and him bragging about his crimes. On the other hand, Jennings's lawyers said there was no physical evidence against Jennings, who had no confessed, and argued that the witnesses could not be trusted since they were also criminals. They also pointed out that there were no black people on the prospective jury, despite everyone involved in the case being black. One witness for the defense, a paper company worker named James Edward Booth, claimed that another man had threatened to kill Matthews on the day she died, but was unable to ascertain who it was due to the fact that at the time of the crimes, he was unconscious in his car.

In 1995, Jennings was convicted of two counts of capital murder for killing Walton and Matthews. The conviction as praised by the prosecutors, while members of Jennings' family, most notably his father, stated that his son had no chance because he was tried before an all-white jury. A week later, after only two hours of deliberation, the jury sentenced Jennings to death. He was first defendant to be sentenced to death in Tarrant County in 1995.

== Execution ==
After his conviction, Jennings was transferred to await execution at the state death row at the Huntsville Unit. During his stay, he was considered a model prisoner who had no disciplinary actions taken against him and was an avid reader of philosophical works. He filed multiple appeals against his death sentence, but all of them were rejected. He also missed the necessary deadline to petition for a clemency hearing, submitting it just one day before his scheduled execution.

Jennings was executed by lethal injection on November 16, 1999. He declined a last meal. On the day of his execution, Jennings warned guards that he would resist his execution. When the guards arrived at his cell, he told them, "I won't do this." After refusing to voluntarily leave his cell, prison officials incapacitated him with pepper spray. When the time of his execution came, Jennings resisted once more and had to be forcibly removed from his holding cell by a five-man team. As he was taken to the death chamber, he thanked the guards for not using tear gas.

It was the first time since Texas reinstated capital punishment in the 1970s that prison officials had to forcibly move a death row inmate due to them refusing to cooperate. When the warden asked Jennings if he had a last statement, he said, "No, I do not." Jennings was pronounced dead at 6:22 PM.

== See also ==
- List of people executed by lethal injection
- List of people executed in Texas, 1990–1999
- List of people executed in the United States in 1999
- List of serial killers in the United States
