= Jeffery Lee Griffin =

Executed American serial killer

- Born: 1955; Houston, Texas, U.S.
- Died: November 19, 1992 (aged 37); Huntsville Unit, Huntsville, Texas, U.S.
- Cause of death: Execution by lethal injection
- Conviction: Capital murder
- Penalty: Death

Details
- Victims: 3
- Span of crimes: 1978–1979
- Country: United States
- State: Texas
- Date apprehended: March 14, 1979

Jeffery Lee Griffin (1955 – November 19, 1992) was an American serial killer who abducted and stabbed three people to death in Houston between 1978 and 1979. Tried and convicted for only one of the murders, he was sentenced to death and subsequently executed in 1992.

== Early life ==
Little is known about Griffin's upbringing. Born in Houston in 1955, he was raised in a family with several other children and reportedly showed signs of mental illness since he was five years old, due to which he was repeatedly interned in state hospitals after reaching the age of eleven. Around the summer of 1978, he was released under clinical supervision and allowed to return to his home in Houston, where he soon found work as a male fashion model. Neighbors and acquaintances of Griffin said that he often spent his time playing basketball in Moody Park, and was not known to be violent.

== Murders ==
On July 23, 1978, the partially nude body of 20-year-old waitress Sylvia Mendoza was found dumped in a trash bin, with a subsequent autopsy determining that she had been stabbed a total of 49 times. Multiple people were questioned about the case, including Griffin, who claimed to have "witnessed" somebody abducting her, but supposedly was unable to identify the perpetrator. As there was no credible evidence pointing to his guilt at the time, he was let go.

On March 13, 1979, Griffin went to the One Stop Drive In, a small convenience store in his neighborhood with the intention of robbing it. When he entered, he threatened the 19-year-old employee David Sobotik and his 7-year-old friend, Horacio DeLeon, who had been visiting him at the time. After ransacking the store and stealing $175, he forced the pair to enter Sobotik's car and drove several blocks away. When they reached an isolated location, Griffin began stabbing both Sobotik and DeLeon, focusing his thrusts around the heart area of both victims. He would later claim that he said "sorry" each time he stabbed DeLeon. After the murders, Griffin went back to the apartment of an acquaintance armed with a gun and requested that he stay the night at his place, spending the entirety of the night lying on the floor and being visibly distressed.

== Trial, imprisonment and execution ==
On the following day, Griffin contacted the police and claimed he had witnessed two men rob and abduct Sobotik and DeLeon, but his claims were not believed, and he was brought to the police station for further questioning. While in there, he gave a full confession to both the double murder and the murder of Mendoza, and even offered where he had dumped the skinning knife used in the slayings. When pressed for a motive, Griffin claimed that "something inside told him to stab them".

At his murder trial, it was decided that Griffin should be charged solely with Sobotik's murder, although the reasons why are unclear. During the proceedings, Griffin was documented carrying comic books in his back pocket. In the end, he was found guilty on all charges and sentenced to death, with his first execution date scheduled for June 14, 1984. This date was later canceled after Griffin's lawyer, Stephen G. Schneider, filed a habeas corpus petition to the Texas Court of Criminal Appeals. After that matter was resolved, a second date was scheduled for July 17, 1985, but that was also delayed when another appeal was filed in the federal courts on the grounds that Griffin deserved leniency for admitting to his crimes and the fact that some prospective jurors had been excluded from serving.

A third and final appeal was submitted to the Supreme Court in 1992, in the hopes that they would issue a stay of execution that would potentially delay Griffin's third execution date. This was denied, and on November 19, 1992, Griffin was executed via lethal injection at the Huntsville Unit, an event celebrated by Sobotik's family members. Griffin spent his last hours laughing with the prison chaplain, and as he was being prepared to enter the death chamber, he said his goodbyes to his mother, aunt, and his fiancée, whom he named as Regina from England. His final words were "You're a good warden. I'll see you. I'm ready."

== See also ==
- Capital punishment in Texas
- List of people executed by lethal injection
- List of people executed in Texas, 1990–1999
- List of people executed in the United States in 1992
- List of serial killers in the United States
