= Ernest Willis =

American man who spent 17 years on death row before being exonerated

- Born: August 17, 1945; Las Cruces, New Mexico, U.S.
- Died: January 7, 2021 (aged 75); Oakland, Mississippi, U.S.
- Occupation: Oilfield worker
- Known for: Being exonerated in 2004 after serving 17 years on death row
- Spouse: Verilyn Harbin (m. 2000)

Ernest Ray Willis (August 17, 1945 – January 7, 2021) was an American man who spent 17 years on death row for an alleged double murder by arson before being exonerated in 2004.

Convicted of murder after two women died in a fire in the West Texas home where he was living at the time, Willis was sentenced to death in 1987. In 1991, another death row inmate, David Martin Long, confessed to starting the fire. However, Long's confession could not be sufficiently corroborated to support a finding of Willis's innocence. However, subsequent interest in the case led to further investigations into the origin of the fire that cast doubt on the cause. New investigators concluded that the cause of the fire could not be determined.

In 2004, Willis's conviction was overturned and the charges against him were dismissed. Citing Long's confession and the lack of a motive by Willis, prosecutors concluded that even if the fire was intentionally set, Willis was most likely uninvolved.

== Background ==
Willis was born in Las Cruces, New Mexico. Before he was 40 years old, he had been divorced several times, and he had back problems that prevented him from working and made him dependent on food stamps. He developed an addiction to pain medication, and he had three convictions for driving under the influence. Willis had moved to Odessa, Texas, to live with his cousin, Billy Willis. They later moved to the town of Iraan, Texas.

Willis had an 8th grade education. He often set fires and watched them burn. As a child, Willis once nearly burned down his parent's home.

== Fire ==
On the night of June 10, 1986, Willis and his cousin Billy came home with two women that they had met that day, 24-year-old Elizabeth Belue and 25-year-old Gail Allison.

In the early morning hours of June 11, Billy said he woke up to the smell of something burning. Unable to find the source, he went back to sleep. Ernest Willis said he awoke to the smell of smoke around 4:00 AM. The Willis cousins were able to make it out of the burning house, but the flames had pushed Willis back when he tried to rescue Belue and Allison. Both women died in the fire.

Willis first raised the suspicions of police with his behavior at the scene of the fire and actions after. He was smoking as firefighters extinguished the fire and he did not seem to have inhaled much smoke. In contrast, Billy said he was unable to smoke cigarettes for several hours due to the smoke in his lungs.

Willis was barefoot, but there were no burn marks on his feet.

Willis said he was unable to enter the bedrooms due to the fire and smoke, and instead ran around the outside, breaking windows in an attempt to help those still inside. However, broken glass was only found outside the house.

No cinder marks were found on Willis's clothes, although there was a stain on the shoulder. Willis said he had acquired the stain while running through the burning house. However, the stain was later identified as betadine, an antiseptic.

Willis had no burn marks, no singed clothing, and no singed hair. Two days after the fire, however, Willis showed a "very bad" burn mark on his shoulder to Sheriff Bruce Wilson. Several witnesses, including Wilson, testified that Willis had no such injury on the day of the fire. Wilson said there was "no way" he could have overlooked the burn mark when he personally examined Willis. A doctor who examined Willis hours after the fire testified that he had no respiratory problems and did not complain of any injuries.

A garden hose with its front portion cut off was found on the premises of the home. Witnesses stated that it was a newly purchased and previously intact garden hose. A smaller portion of the garden hose reeked with the smell of gasoline. Traces of gasoline were detected on the hose.

Arson investigators concluded that had anyone been sleeping on the sofa in the living room, as Willis had claimed, he would have been burned, potentially fatally.

Although information about Willis's background was not admitted as evidence at his trial, investigators became increasingly suspicious of him after learning about his past. Willis had been married nine times prior to his conviction. His ex-wives told investigators that he had a fascination with fires. Two vehicles owned by Willis had also been mysteriously set on fire.

Willis and his cousin both changed their stories on one point. Initially, Willis and cousin said that they were sleeping in the living area, while the women slept in separate bedrooms. However, both men later said that Billy was asleep in bed with Gail Allison. Asked why he changed his story, Billy expressed concern about damaging Allison's reputation (Allison was married).

Four months after the fire, Willis was arrested and charged with murder. However, no motive was ever found for why Willis would set the fire. Prosecutors were surprised when they were able to secure a capital murder indictment against him.

== Trial and imprisonment ==
At trial, Willis appeared cold and emotionless, and prosecutors commented to the jury about his demeanor. Willis did not realize that his behavior was abnormal; after his arrest, for reasons that were unclear, he had been started on high doses of antipsychotic medication. These medications can be associated with an apathetic appearance.

Prior to the trial, Dr. Jarvis Wright, a forensic psychologist, examined Willis for the purpose of determining the likelihood that Willis would pose a future danger to society if he received a life sentence. Under Texas law, the jury was legally required to find that Willis was a future danger to society before imposing the death penalty. Dr. Wright concluded that Willis was not a future threat to society and advised the prosecution that the trial should not be a capital case. His findings were never disclosed to the defense.

During the trial, the prosecution referred to Willis as a "rat," and "animal," a "satanic demon," and a "monster from a horror film," and as someone who had "committed his soul to the devil."

Willis was convicted of capital murder and sent to death row in August 1987.

Willis met his final wife, Verilyn Harbin, while he was on death row. Harbin was the sister of death row inmate Ricky McGinn, who in June 2000 had been the first Texas inmate to receive a stay of execution from governor George W. Bush, who granted McGinn a reprieve so he could conduct DNA tests. (Bush declined to halt 131 earlier executions during his tenure.) Willis and Harbin corresponded and later met at McGinn's insistence. McGinn was executed in September 2000 after the DNA tests conclusively reaffirmed his guilt, and Willis and Harbin were married a month after the execution.

As his appeals went by, Willis said that he became depressed and stopped exercising. Willis weighed 185 pounds when he went to prison, and his weight eventually reached 300 pounds.

== Confession of fellow death row inmate ==
In 1990, Willis had a chance encounter with a fellow death row inmate, David Martin Long, during an irregularly scheduled recreation period in a prison day room. Long recognized Willis by his last name, and asked him if he knew Billy. Willis said he did. Willis, after which Long explained that he had previously been involved in drug-related activities with Billy Willis. Long said he hated Billy because he had taken the fall for one of Billy's drugstore burglaries, and Billy abandoned him. During their meeting, Willis said he was on death row for the Iraan fire.

Long said he felt haunted by their encounter and later scheduled another meeting with Willis, in which he confessed to setting the Iraan fire. Long later told a prison psychiatrist, George Wheat, that he had set the Iraan fire and Willis was innocent. Although initially skeptical of Long's confession, the Wheat came to believe that it was truthful and the confession had to be disclosed.

After Wheat informed the original investigators about Long's confession, one of the original investigators, Deputy Jackson, met with Long. On September 11, 1990, Long made a three-hour confession to starting the fire in Iraan in Jackson's presence. Long described how he drove to the house, what roads he took, and how long it took for him to get there. He also gave a detailed description of the house itself.

According to Long, he arrived in Iraan some time between 2:00 AM and 4:00 AM. He spent 20 minutes drinking and injecting himself with methamphetamines before entering the house. Long saw Willis sleeping on the sofa, but did not wake him. He used a lighter to ignite some clothing draped over a piece of furniture in the living room. After setting the fire, Long said he left the house, returned to his truck, and drove a couple of blocks down the street.

Long's confession, which was recorded on video, generated new interest in the case among Willis's appeals lawyers, and they worked to confirm the information in Long's story. The crime scene evidence indicated that liquor such as Everclear and Wild Turkey could have been used as accelerants as Long claimed. Long seemed a plausible suspect because he had admitted to starting a mobile home fire in Bay City, Texas. That 1983 blaze had resulted in the death of Long's former boss.

During an evidentiary hearing on Long's confession in 1998, Billy confirmed that he knew Long. An eyewitness to the fire, Amelia Fuentes, testified that she had seen a vehicle driving slowly past her house before officials arrived to respond to the fire. Fuentes said she had never seen the vehicle before, but when she told the police about it, but Jackson had told her to forget about it.

A fire marshal gave testimony corroborating Long's confession, saying the state's theory of the case was mistaken.

Nevertheless, the court found that Long's confession could could not be sufficiently corroborated as to exclude Willis's involvement. Long refused to testify and could not be cross-examined.

== Exoneration ==
The interest generated by Long's confession led to new investigations into the Willis case. While on death row, Willis had written letters to the mother of a mentally ill inmate because her son had routinely thrown away her letters without answering. That inmate's mother forwarded some of Willis's letters to Steven Losch, a death row attorney. Losch helped recruit a team of lawyers from Latham & Watkins to support Willis with his case.

In 2004, a U.S. district judge threw out Willis's conviction, ruling that Willis had been unnecessarily drugged during his trial and that the state suppressed testimony from a psychologist who found that Willis was not dangerous to society. The judge also found that lawyers for Willis had failed to present evidence showing that it would've been out of character for him to set the fire. Willis had no history of violence and once dove into a lake to save a boy from drowning.

Lawyers for Willis also provided alternative explanations for some of other circumstantial evidence against him. As for why no glass had been found inside the house, they claimed the windows of the house had two panels, and that the second layer prevented any glass from falling inside. As for the possibly planted burn mark on Willis's shoulder, they presented evidence that blistering does not necessarily occur immediately as a result of thermal burning.

The Texas attorney general and the Pecos County district attorney, Ori White, declined to pursue the case further. White said that new investigators had labeled the fire's cause as undetermined. Although Willis had a history of setting fires in the past, White emphasized that Willis had no motive. Citing Long's confession, White concluded that even if the fire was intentionally set, Willis was most likely uninvolved.

Willis was released from prison in October 2004. He was the eighth Texas death row inmate exonerated since the state resumed executions in 1982, and he was thought to have served the longest sentence on death row among that group.

In 2005, Willis received $429,000 in compensation, plus a monthly annuity of $9,965.

After his release from prison, Willis and his wife moved to Mississippi, where they mostly kept a low profile. He started his own business hauling houses and boats across the United States. Willis considered writing a book about his experiences, but he never did so. Willis and his wife separated in 2007 and he moved to Midland, Texas. In 2012, when the family of executed Texas inmate Cameron Todd Willingham announced that they would attempt to have Willingham posthumously pardoned, Willis attended the press conference in Austin. By that time, he had gotten back together with his wife and was living in Mississippi again.

Willis died in Oakland, Mississippi on January 7, 2021.

== See also ==
- List of exonerated death row inmates (United States)
