= Johnny Frank Garrett's Last Word =

- Theatrical release poster
- Directed by: Simon Rumley
- Written by: Ben Ketai
- Produced by: Rob DeFranco; Peter Facinelli; Eric Gores; Frank Mancuso, Jr.
- Production companies: A7SLE Films; Boss Media
- Distributed by: Sony Pictures Home Entertainment
- Release date: March 13, 2016 (United States)
- Running time: 95 minutes
- Country: United States
- Language: English

Johnny Frank Garrett's Last Word is a 2016 American horror thriller film directed by Simon Rumley. It is a work of fiction based on the Jesse Quackenbush documentary The Last Word, about the trial, conviction, and execution of a Texas man, Johnny Frank Garrett. It played at the 2016 South by Southwest Midnighters, Festival Favorites, Shorts Programs and Special Events lineup

== Plot ==
On Halloween night 1981, Catholic nun Tadea Benz is brutally murdered. In a rush to judgment, law enforcement in Amarillo, Texas feel pressured to solve the case quickly amidst widespread panic and lynch mob anger. Soon a suspect emerges as 18-year-old Johnny Frank Garrett is arrested and put on trial.

Overlooking evidence that could have cleared his name, the jury passes swift judgment and Garrett is convicted and sentenced to death. From the time of his arrest until his dying breath Garrett professes his innocence, and following the execution a letter is found in his cell, promising retribution and cursing the souls of anyone connected with his demise.

Within weeks after his execution, Johnny's terrifying prophecy is unleashed as a series of unexplained deaths strike down those involved in the cover-up. As the list of victims grows, it is left to one conscience-stricken juror to exonerate Johnny and break his curse before it’s too late...

== Cast ==
- Sean Patrick Flanery as District Attorney Danny Hill
- Erin Cummings as Lara Redman
- Mike Doyle as Adam Redman
- Sue Rock as Harmony
- Jon Michael Davis as Doctor Andrews
- Cassie Shea Watson as Kathy Jones
- Mike Gassaway as Harold Pinkman
- Julia Lashae as Juror #3
- Holt Boggs as Impassioned Man
- Chip Joslin as Attendant
- Arthur Richardson as Chago
- Jon Arthur as Police Chief
- Bill Stinchcomb as Prison Guard
- Dodge Prince as Sam
- Tim Childress as Execution Doctor
- Mister Brian as Corrupt Town Policeman
- Chris Dean Keith as pallbearer

== Reception ==
Dennis Harvey of Variety wrote that overall the movie "juggles eerie restraint and grotesque frenzy with confidence."

John DeFore of The Hollywood Reporter wrote that Johnny Frank Garrett's Last Word was a "A schlocky fright flick where subtlety is a foreign language" and that it "may amuse hardcore genre fans but is unlikely to find takers for theatrical distribution."
