= Mark Gardner (murderer) =

Mark Edward Gardner (May 4, 1956 – September 8, 1999) was an American murderer executed at the age of 43 by lethal injection by the state of Arkansas. He was convicted of the December 12, 1985 murders of Joe and Martha Joyce, as well as the rape and murder of their daughter, Sara Joyce McCurdy, in Sebastian County, Arkansas.

== Murders ==
Mark Gardner was 29 when he killed Joe Joyce and his wife Martha, and raped and murdered their adult daughter, Sara Joyce McCurdy. Joe Joyce had just returned home from a funeral and Sara McCurdy had gone to her parents' home for lunch while her husband was away on Air National Guard duty. The family was tied up and they were suffocated with tape that was placed over their mouths and noses. Martha was found with a wire coat hanger around her neck. Their house was ransacked and jewelry and a car was stolen. Gardner was on parole for an armed robbery conviction and was under an arrest warrant out of Illinois for another armed robbery. Some of the family's jewelry was found on Gardner when he was arrested and he told police that he had also killed a man in New York State. At his trial he claimed that demons had made him do it.

Mark Gardner was accused of repeatedly raping and beating a fellow Death Row inmate who was later released from prison, Damien Echols, who had been convicted for the West Memphis Three murders.

== Execution ==
Gardner's last meal was fried shrimp, grilled salmon, garden salad, and chocolate cake with a Coke. Gardner was executed first because he had a lower inmate number (SK901) than Alan Willett (SK930). The injection of a lethal drug was administered at 8:02 p.m. CDT, and he was pronounced dead at 8:15.

Gardner's last words were "Blessed are those who are called to the Lord's supper. A never-ending feast awaits me. I love the Melanie Alberson family (his pastoral advisor) and I thank them very much."

Gardner was the 3rd condemned inmate to be put to death in 1999 in Arkansas and the 20th person executed by the state of Arkansas since Furman v. Georgia, 408 U.S. 238 (1972), after new capital punishment laws were passed in Arkansas and that came into force on March 23, 1973.

He was also the 569th person executed overall since America resumed executions on January 17, 1977.

== See also ==
- Capital punishment in Arkansas
- Capital punishment in the United States
- List of people executed in Arkansas
- List of people executed in the United States in 1999

== General references ==
- Papal Appeal for Men on Death Row Sent to Arkansas Governor from the United States conference of Catholic Bishops
- The Morning news of Arkansas: “Gardner, Willett are put to death” page A1
- 2007 Facts Brochure. Arkansas Department of Correction. Retrieved on 2007-11-13.

Executions carried out in Arkansas
| Preceded by Marion Albert Pruett April 12, 1999 | Mark Gardner; September 8, 1999 | Succeeded by Alan Willett September 8, 1999 |
Executions carried out in the United States
| Preceded by Raymond Jones – Texas September 1, 1999 | Mark Gardner – Arkansas; September 8, 1999 | Succeeded by Alan Willett – Arkansas September 8, 1999 |
