= Mark Gardiner (gamer) =

British electronic sports player

Marko9Gardinic

Personal information
- Name: Mark Gardiner
- Nationality: Scottish

Career information
- Games: Pro Evolution Soccer 6

Mark Gardiner is a Scottish semi-professional video gamer. On 15 March 2008, Gardiner won the largest single prize in United Kingdom video gaming history at that time. Playing Pro Evolution Soccer (PES), he won £50,000 inside Wembley Stadium, in the Play.com-sponsored PES Rankings tournament. He also finished second at the European Pro Evolution Soccer 6 Championships in Seville, Spain on 11 October 2007, and won the UK Championships held in London on 2 September 2007. He uses the nickname "Marko9Gardinic" during video game competitions. He also reached the final of the Mario kart UK championships.

Gardiner, from Hamilton, South Lanarkshire, plays football for amateur team Blue Dragon, in the Glasgow Chinese Football League. He scored 19 goals in the 06/07 season which netted him the prize of top scorer.
