= Johnny Frank Garrett =

Executed American murderer (1963–1992)

Johnny Frank Garrett

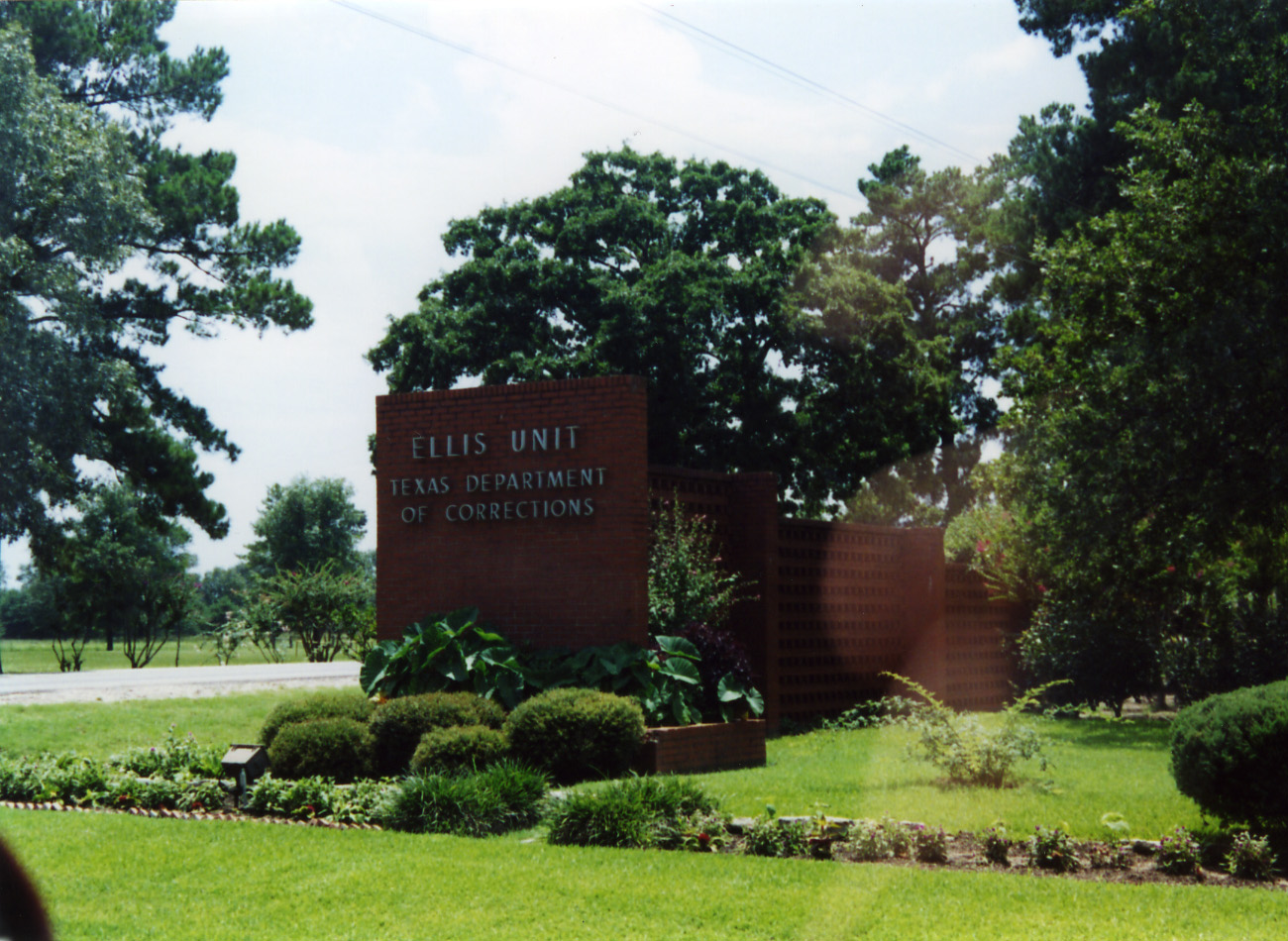
Ellis Unit, where Garrett was held on death row

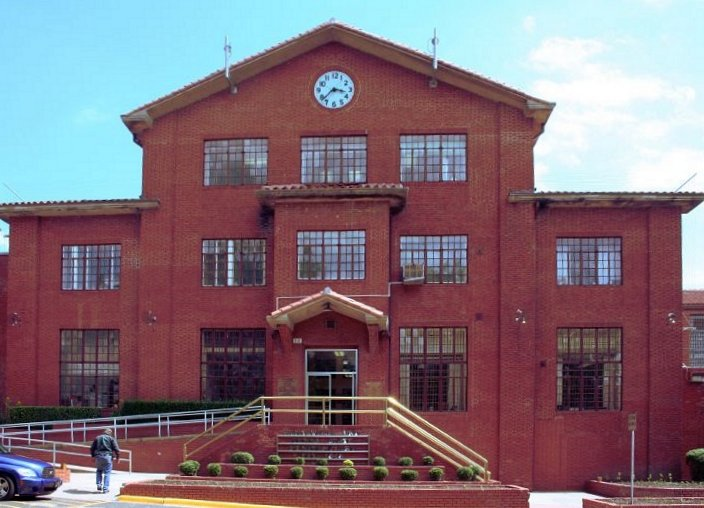
Huntsville Unit, where Garrett was put to death

Johnny Frank Garrett (December 24, 1963 – February 11, 1992) was a death row prisoner executed by the State of Texas.

== Murder of Tadea Benz ==
Johnny Frank Garrett was accused of murdering a Catholic nun who lived across the street from him. The date of the murder was on the morning of October 31, 1981, Garrett was 17 years old at the time, equal to age of majority for criminal responsibility in Texas. According to the prosecution, that morning, Garrett raped, strangled, and killed 76-year-old Sister Tadea Benz in the St. Francis Convent. On November 9, 1981, Garrett, who lived across the street from the convent, was arrested and charged with murder.

== Trial and execution ==
Garrett was tried and convicted of the crime. He was held at Ellis Unit, north of Huntsville, Texas, which at the time held men on the State of Texas's death row. He was originally scheduled to be executed on January 6, 1992, but after Pope John Paul II asked for clemency, Governor of Texas Ann Richards gave him a temporary reprieve. After Richards's reprieve, the Texas Board of Pardons and Paroles held a hearing on whether Garrett should receive a commutation to life in prison but the death sentence was retained by a 17 to 1 vote. He was examined by Dr. Dorothy Otnow Lewis, who determined he had multiple personalities as a result of child abuse from his mother, grandmother, and grandfather. He was ultimately executed at age 28 at Huntsville Unit on February 11, 1992, by lethal injection.

His final meal request was ice cream. The TDCJ website has stated since at least 2012 that "this offender declined to make a last statement." However, there are last words of Garrett reported from the time of execution re-quoted frequently, and reported by APBnews as: "I'd like to thank my family for loving me and taking care of me. The rest of the world can kiss my ever-loving ass."

Director Jesse Quackenbush, a man from Albany, New York who graduated from the University of Houston Law School in 1987 and, that year, moved to Amarillo, made the documentary The Last Word which argues that Garrett was in fact innocent of the crime. He argued that Garrett was the victim of overzealous prosecutors and poor defense attorneys. It was adapted into the semi-fictional horror film Johnny Frank Garrett's Last Word.

== See also ==
- Capital punishment for juveniles in the United States
- Capital punishment in Texas
- Capital punishment in the United States
- List of people executed in Texas, 1990–1999
- List of people executed in the United States in 1992
