= Voluntary capital punishment =

Prisoner asking for death as a punishment

In capital punishment, a volunteer is a prisoner who wishes to be sentenced to death. Often, volunteers will waive all appeals in an attempt to expedite the sentence. In the United States, execution volunteers constitute approximately 10% of prisoners on death row. Volunteers can sometimes bypass legal procedures which are designed to designate the death penalty for the most serious offenders. Other prisoners have killed in prison with the desire of receiving the death sentence. Opponents of execution volunteering cited the prevalence of mental illness among volunteers comparing it to a form of suicide. Execution volunteering has received considerably less attention and effort at legal reform than those who were exonerated after execution.

== History ==
Since the 1976 reinstatement of capital punishment in the United States, there have been at least 150 documented cases of execution volunteers. The first documented case since 1976 was of Gary Gilmore in 1977 who "withdrew his rights of appeal from Utah’s legal system and requested that the courts enforce his death sentence as soon as possible". A notable, recurring pathology of criminals requesting execution is serial killers, including Westley Allan Dodd and Michael Bruce Ross.

Robert South was sentenced to death for killing a police officer in South Carolina. In 1996 he decided to waive his right to appeal due to a benign tumor which "significantly disrupted his sleep cycle, made him extremely sensitive to noise, and caused frequent and severe headaches". He had also suffered from chronic post-traumatic stress disorder.

Robert Comer was executed in 2007, after making pleas for his execution since around 2000. Comer testified to his capital murder charge in 2002 to add incentive, and after his spree that included murder, kidnapping, and rape, he was also known for numerous crimes and infractions during his time in prison.

In 2013, Robert Gleason was executed after killing two inmates in prison while serving a life sentence for a murder committed in 2007. After killing the first inmate, Gleason said he would not stop killing until he received the death sentence. Similarly, Rocky Beamon was imprisoned for murder in 2005, then killed two child sex offenders in the coming years and also demanded an execution to prevent him from killing again. Beamon ended up committing suicide in 2020.

In 2016, Scott Dozier voluntarily waived his appeals and wrote a letter to District Judge Jennifer Togliatti asking her to expedite his execution after a murder conviction. Dozier died of suicide on January 5, 2019 after repeated stays of execution.

== Studies ==
John Blume, a professor at Cornell Law School, published an article in the Michigan Law Review which examined the relationship between "volunteering" for execution and suicide. Blume found a strong correlation between volunteering and mental illness. According to Blume "nearly 88% of all death row inmates who have 'volunteered' for execution have struggled with mental illness and/or substance abuse".

Many inmates experience a "death row phenomenon" as a response of a capital punishment sentence, in which traumatic effects are experienced from being placed in death row custody due to the conditions or the impending death sentence.

== Known volunteered inmates ==
=== Inmates executed after successful volunteering ===
- Herman Ashworth – American murderer (1973–2005)
- Billy Bailey – American convicted murderer; last person to be hanged in the US
- James Barnes – American murderer (1962–2023)
- Rocky Barton – American murderer (1956–2006)
- Rodney Berget – 2011 murder of a corrections officer in South Dakota
- Wilford Berry Jr. – American murderer (1962–1999)
- Arthur Gary Bishop – American serial killer (1952–1988)
- Jesse Bishop – American murderer (1933–1979)
- Gerald Bordelon – American murderer (1962–2010)
- Alvaro Calambro – 1994 double murder in Reno, Nevada
- Scott Carpenter – American murderer (1975–1997)
- Edward Castro – American serial killer (1950–2000)
- Marco Allen Chapman – American murderer
- John Christie – English serial killer (1899–1953)
- Terry D. Clark – American murderer (1956–2001)
- James B. Clark Jr. – American murderer (1957–1996)
- Carroll Cole – American serial killer (1938–1985)
- Harvey Collins – American serial killer (1925–1957)
- Eric Edgar Cooke – Australian serial killer
- Frank J. Coppola – American murderer (1944–1982)
- Joseph Corcoran – American mass murderer
- David Neal Cox – American murderer (1970–2021)
- Leon Czolgosz – Assassin of William McKinley (1873–1901)
- Gary Lee Davis – American convicted murderer (1944–1997)
- David Thomas Dawson – American murderer (1957–2006)
- Derrick Dearman – Mass murder in Alabama, US
- Valery Devyatyorov – Soviet serial killer and rapist
- Westley Allan Dodd – American serial killer and sex offender (1961–1993)
- William Ernest Downs Jr. – 1999 rape and murder of a young boy in South Carolina
- Michael Durocher – American convicted serial killer (1960–1993)
- James Homer Elledge – American murderer (1942–2001)
- James French – American murderer (c. 1936–1966)
- Gary Gilmore – American murderer (1940–1977)
- Harvey Glatman – Executed American serial killer and rapist (1927–1959)
- Robert Gleason – American serial killer
- Thomas J. Grasso – American murderer (1962–1995)
- Aaron Gunches – American murderer (1971–2025)
- Guo Longhai – Chinese serial killer and rapist
- Carl Austin Hall – American murderer (1919–1953)
- Bonnie Emily Brown – American murderer (1912–1953)
- Edward Lee Harper Jr. – American convicted murderer (1949–1999)
- Hiroaki Hidaka – Japanese serial killer
- David Mark Hill – American spree killer (1960–2008)
- Paul Jennings Hill – American minister and anti-abortion terrorist
- Daryl Holton – American mass murderer (1961–2007)
- Ralph Hudson – Last person executed in New Jersey (1919–1963)
- Phillip Ingle – American serial killer
- Shannon Johnson – American convicted murderer (1983–2012)
- Steven Judy – American mass murderer (1956–1981)
- Sokrat Kirshveng – Bulgarian serial killer
- Andrew Lackey – American murderer (1983–2013)
- Daryl Mack – American murderer (1958–2006)
- Hiroshi Maeue – Japanese serial killer (1968–2009)
- David Mason – American serial killer (1956–1993)
- Robert Lee Massie – American murderer
- Eddie Lee Mays – American murderer and last person executed by the State of New York
- Timothy McVeigh – American domestic terrorist (1968–2001)
- Luis Monge – Puerto Rican murderer who received the death penalty in the U.S.
- Carey Dean Moore – 2018 execution in Nebraska
- Harry Charles Moore – American murderer
- Eliseo Moreno – American murderer (1959–1987)
- Stephen Morin – American serial killer
- Leon Moser – American murderer (1942–1995)
- Jeffrey Motts – American convicted serial killer (1975–2011)
- Travis James Mullis – American child killer (1986–2024)
- Christopher Newton – American murderer
- Shojiro Nishimoto – Japanese serial killer
- Kiyoshi Ōkubo – Japanese serial killer and rapist
- Elijah Page – American murderer (1981–2007)
- Carl Panzram – American serial killer and rapist (1891–1930)
- Joseph Mitchell Parsons – American murderer
- Steven Brian Pennell – American serial killer
- Andrew Pixley – American murderer
- Masahiro Kanagawa – Japanese double murderer (1983–2013)
- Kanesan Ratnam – 2001 murder of a detainee at Queenstown Remand Prison, Singapore
- James Allen Red Dog – American serial killer (1954–1993)
- Asbury Respus – American serial killer
- Christina Marie Riggs – American murderer (1971–2000)
- Eric Robert – 2011 murder of a corrections officer in South Dakota
- Michael Bruce Ross – American serial killer (1959–2005)
- Jeremy Vargas Sagastegui – American murderer (1970–1998)
- John Martin Scripps – British serial killer
- Nelson Shelton – American murderer (1967–1995)
- Takahiro Shiraishi – Japanese serial killer and sex offender (1990–2025)
- Ronald Gene Simmons – American mass murderer (1940–1990)
- Clay King Smith – American mass murderer (1970–2001)
- James Edward Smith – American murderer (1952–1990)
- Arnold Sodeman – Australian serial killer
- Joseph "Mad Dog" Taborsky – Spree and serial killings in Connecticut between 1950–1957
- John Albert Taylor – American murderer
- John Thanos – American murderer (1949–1994)
- William Paul Thompson – American serial killer (1938–1989)
- Michael Torrence – American serial killer
- William Vandiver – American convicted murderer (1948–1985)
- Charles Walker – American murderer (1940–1990)
- Keith Wells – American murderer (1962–1994)
- Alan Willett
- Jeremy Tremaine Williams – American child killer (1984–2026)
- Hastings Arthur Wise – American mass murderer
- Frederick Charles Wood – American serial killer
- Douglas Franklin Wright – American serial killer
- Aileen Wuornos – American serial killer (1956–2002)
- Yukio Yamaji – Japanese serial killer
- Giuseppe Zangara – Attempted assassin of Franklin D. Roosevelt (1900–1933)
- Keith Zettlemoyer – American murderer (1955–1995)

=== Inmates not executed after volunteering ===
- Roberto Arguelles – Died of a self-inflicted bowel obstruction before execution
- Scott Dozier – Died of suicide before execution
- Duc Cong Huynh – Died of suicide by hanging before execution
- Paul Dennis Reid Jr. – Died of complications due to pneumonia, heart failure and upper respiratory issues before execution

== See also ==
- Suicide by cop – Intentional provocation of a lethal response from law enforcement
