= Shannon Johnson (murderer) =

American convicted murderer (1983–2012)

- Born: November 18, 1983; Wilmington, Delaware, U.S.
- Died: April 20, 2012 (aged 28); James T. Vaughn Correctional Center, New Castle County, Delaware, U.S.
- Cause of death: Execution by lethal injection
- Known for: Last person executed by the state of Delaware
- Convictions: First degree murder First degree assault First degree reckless endangerment Fourth degree rape Possession of a firearm during the commission of a felony (3 counts); Possession of a firearm by a prohibited person (2 counts)
- Penalty: Death (March 27, 2008)

Details
- Date: September 24, 2006
- Country: United States
- State: Delaware
- Killed: 1
- Injured: 2
- Weapon: Pistol
- Date apprehended: November 15, 2006

Shannon M. Johnson (November 18, 1983 – April 20, 2012) was an American convicted murderer and rapist who was executed for the 2006 murder of 25-year-old Cameron Hamlin in Wilmington, Delaware. Johnson refused to appeal the verdict, and was executed by lethal injection at the James T. Vaughn Correctional Center on April 20, 2012. Delaware's capital punishment statute was declared unconstitutional on August 2, 2016. The state formally abolished capital punishment in 2024, making Johnson the last person to be executed by the state of Delaware.

== Prior criminal history ==
Johnson's criminal record consisted of 57 arrests on 145 misdemeanor charges and 33 felony offenses since 2001. On December 19, 2002, Johnson raped a pregnant 18-year-old woman. He pleaded guilty to fourth degree rape for that crime. This prior violent felony conviction made Hamlin's murder a capital offense. Johnson was also suspected of shooting his stepfather.

== Crimes ==
On September 24, 2006, Johnson went to the home of his ex-girlfriend, Lakeisha Truitt, in Wilmington, Delaware. The relationship between the two had ended due to Johnson abusing Truitt, but the pair had a son together. Johnson had hoped to reconcile with Truitt and had gone to see her, but instead he came across Truitt and 25-year-old Cameron Hamlin, who was Truitt's new boyfriend and had been staying at Truitt's home. He spotted Hamlin and Truitt sitting in front of her home in a car. Johnson pulled out a gun and began firing into the car, fatally wounding Hamlin. He then fled the scene. Truitt was not injured in the shooting and ran to her grandmother's house where she called the police. Due to concern for her safety, she was advised not to return home until Johnson was caught.

However, on November 10, 2006, she decided to return home and retrieve some clothes for her son. Johnson had evaded detection, but had been stalking Truitt. As Truitt sat in her car, he ran towards her and fired at her with a gun. He managed to hit Truitt, but stopped and fled when his gun jammed. Truitt was injured in the shooting but survived.

== Trial ==
Johnson was captured and arrested by Wilmington Police on November 15, 2006. He was convicted of first degree murder in New Castle County Superior Court on March 27, 2008, and sentenced to death. Prosecutors also accused Johnson of trying to hire an inmate who was going to be released to kill Truitt and prevent her testimony.

After the Delaware Supreme Court upheld his death sentence in 2009, Johnson said he did not want to pursue any further appeals. Johnson waived his appeals, speeding up his own execution. Federal public defenders twice sought to intervene in the case without Johnson's consent. They argued Johnson was mentally incompetent, but a state judge concluded he was not.

== Execution ==
Johnson was executed by lethal injection on April 20, 2012, at the James T. Vaughn Correctional Center. His last meal was chicken lo mein, carrots, cake, wheat bread and margarine and iced tea.

Following his execution, Delaware's supply of lethal injection drugs expired, meaning they had no means of executing death row inmates. On August 2, 2016, the Delaware Supreme Court ruled that the state's death penalty was unconstitutional. Due to the ruling, Johnson is officially the last person to be executed by the state of Delaware.

== See also ==
- Capital punishment in Delaware
- Capital punishment in the United States
- List of most recent executions by jurisdiction
- List of people executed in Delaware
- List of people executed in the United States in 2012

Executions carried out in Delaware
Preceded by Robert W. Jackson III July 29, 2011	Shannon M. Johnson; April 20, 2012	Succeeded by none
Executions carried out in the United States
Preceded by Mark Wayne Wiles – Ohio April 18, 2012	Shannon M. Johnson – Delaware; April 20, 2012	Succeeded by Thomas Arnold Kemp – Arizona April 25, 2012
