= Brian Steckel =

American murderer (1968–2005)

Brian David Steckel
- Born: December 14, 1968; Allentown, Pennsylvania, U.S.
- Died: November 4, 2005 (aged 36); James T. Vaughn Correctional Center, Delaware, U.S.
- Status: Executed by lethal injection
- Convictions: First degree murder First degree unlawful sexual intercourse First degree unlawful sexual penetration First degree arson Aggravated harassment
- Penalty: Death

Brian David Steckel (December 14, 1968 – November 4, 2005) was an American convicted killer in the 1994 rape and murder of 29-year-old Sandra Lee Long near Wilmington, Delaware.

== Crime ==
On September 2, 1994, Steckel knocked on Long's door and asked to use her telephone. Once inside, he disconnected the phone and demanded sex from her. When she refused, he threw her onto a couch and attempted to strangle her with some pantyhose. The pantyhose broke, so he continued his attack with a sock. After she was unconscious he sexually assaulted her. He then dragged Long to a bedroom, where he set her and the curtains on fire. Long died of smoke inhalation and burns to 60 percent of her body.

Steckel then went to the home of a former co-worker, where he drank several beers. After the co-worker left, Steckel asked the co-worker's wife to drive him to a liquor store. This led them past Long's apartment, now on fire. The co-worker's wife later said that Steckel became agitated and angry when she jokingly said, "You look like you've killed someone."

Within hours of the fire, a man called The News Journal saying he was the "Driftwood Killer" and named his next victim. This woman was put into protective custody by police, where she told them that she had been receiving phone calls that were, "Very lurid. Very sexual." The calls to the newspaper and the woman were traced to Steckel, and he was arrested on an outstanding harassment warrant. Steckel was drunk at the time of the arrest and so allowed to sleep the night. The next morning, after waiving his Miranda rights, he confessed to the attack on Long. A forensic dentist determined that a bite wound on Steckel's finger was made by Long.

== Trial and imprisonment ==
He was convicted in New Castle County of three counts of first degree murder (one count of "intentional" murder and two counts of felony murder). After the separate penalty phase, he was sentenced to death on January 8, 1997, by a vote of 11–1. During the penalty phase he told the jurors: "I ask you to hold me accountable for what I did. … I know what I did was wrong: it was selfish [and] despicable."

Steckel was otherwise unrepentant for his crime. During his trial he sent Long's mother a copy of the autopsy report attached to a note that read: "Read it and weep. She's gone forever. Don't cry over burnt flesh."

The sentence and conviction were affirmed by a Delaware Superior Court on May 22, 1998. Throughout 1998 and 1999, Steckel continued to appeal his conviction and sentences, claiming that he had ineffectual defense. This claim was rejected by the Superior Court on August 31, 2001, and by the Delaware Supreme Court on April 11, 2002. Other appeals for the writ of habeas corpus were denied by U.S. District Court for the District of Delaware and the United States Court of Appeals for the Third Circuit. Steckel also tried to challenge the constitutionality of the death penalty laws in place in Delaware at the time of his sentencing. On September 30, 2005, a Superior Court set an execution date of November 4.

== Death ==
At his execution Steckel said:

I want to say I'm sorry for the cruel things I did. I'm not the same man I was when I came to jail. I changed. I'm a better man. … I walked in here without a fight, and I accept my punishment. It is time to go. I love you people. … I'm at peace."

He was pronounced dead at 12:21 a.m. EDT on November 4, 2005, after being executed by lethal injection at the Delaware Correctional Center, near Smyrna.

Fordham University law professor Deborah Denno, a death penalty expert, said that descriptions of the execution seem to suggest that there were several failures in injecting the drugs. Witnesses said several audible clicks (from the lethal injection machine, which led to them to get rid of the computer) were heard during the twelve minutes after Steckel finished his last statement. During this time Steckel was still lucid and continued to make several comments to his family members and friends who witnessed the execution. She said it appears that the sedative and paralytic drugs failed to take effect as Steckel was seen to convulse. Delaware Department of Correction spokeswoman Beth Welch said that nothing went wrong with the execution and the length of time was just due to the Warden giving Brian Steckel more time for his statement.

== See also ==
- Capital punishment in Delaware
- Capital punishment in the United States
- List of people executed in Delaware
- List of people executed in the United States in 2005
