= Thomas Capano =

Disbarred American lawyer, convicted murderer

- Born: Thomas Joseph Capano; October 11, 1949; Delaware, U.S.
- Died: September 19, 2011 (aged 61); Vaughn Correctional Center, Smyrna, Delaware, U.S.
- Occupations: Attorney, political consultant
- Status: Deceased
- Conviction: First degree murder
- Penalty: Death; commuted to life imprisonment

Thomas Joseph Capano (October 11, 1949 – September 19, 2011) was a disbarred American lawyer who was convicted of the 1996 murder of Anne Marie Fahey, his former lover.

== Background ==
Thomas Capano, one of four brothers, belonged to a prominent family of Delaware real estate developers and building contractors. Thomas graduated from Archmere Academy in Claymont, Delaware. He became an affluent lawyer, state prosecutor, Wilmington city attorney, legal counsel to Governor Mike Castle, and political consultant, well known in Delaware's political circles.

In 1994, Capano was a partner at the Wilmington office of Saul Ewing LLP when he became involved with 28-year-old Anne Marie Fahey, the appointments secretary to then-Governor Tom Carper. Married with four daughters, Capano separated from his wife Kay the following year. In September 1995, after breaking things off with Capano, Fahey began a relationship with Michael Scanlan.

== Fahey's disappearance and investigation ==
Fahey was last seen alive on June 27, 1996, when she went to dinner with Capano in Philadelphia. Fahey's family reported her missing on June 30. After an extensive search, the FBI joined in the investigation in July and a federal grand jury heard evidence for over a year. Capano, the last known person to have seen Fahey alive, was the prime suspect. He was arrested for her murder in November 1997, over sixteen months after her disappearance. However, Fahey's body was never found, and prosecutors were unable to establish the cause or manner of her death.

Prosecutors alleged that Capano murdered Fahey at the house he rented and, with the assistance of his brother Gerry, dumped her body in the Atlantic Ocean. Gerry owned a boat and, when it was sold, its two anchors were missing. On November 8, 1997, Gerry was interviewed by detectives and told them that Capano had borrowed the boat and admitted that he had murdered someone who was attempting to extort him. They went to Stone Harbor, New Jersey, with a large cooler that contained Fahey's body, sailed 62 miles (100 km) out to sea, and pushed the cooler overboard. Gerry told police that Capano shot the cooler in order to sink it, but that the cooler remained afloat in the water. Capano then retrieved the cooler, removed the body, and wrapped the anchor chains around it. He also asked Gerry to help dispose of a blood-stained sofa and carpet into a dumpster, which was managed by a third brother, Louis. Capano instructed Louis to empty the dumpsters outside of their regular schedule. The empty cooler was found on July 4, 1996, by a local fisherman.

Investigators did not have a murder weapon or a body, nor any evidence that Capano had purchased a gun. However, Capano's other mistress, Debby MacIntyre, had bought a gun and admitted having supplied the weapon to Capano.

== Trial and appeals ==
The highly publicized case went to trial on October 26, 1998, and lasted twelve weeks. The defense claimed that MacIntyre had burst into Capano's room and, in a jealous rage upon seeing Capano and Fahey engaged in intimacy, had threatened to shoot herself; as Capano and MacIntyre were wrestling for the gun, it discharged and killed Fahey. On January 17, 1999, the jury convicted Capano of first-degree murder and he was sentenced to death by lethal injection. This marked the first time in Delaware state history in which a person was convicted of murder without a body or murder weapon.

In January 2006, the Delaware Supreme Court affirmed Capano's conviction but remanded the case for sentencing because the death penalty was imposed by a non-unanimous jury verdict. In February of that year, the state abandoned its efforts to seek capital punishment, opting to leave Capano imprisoned for life without parole. In April 2008, the U.S. District Court rejected Capano's habeas corpus petition, and on September 2, 2008, the U.S. 3rd Circuit Court of Appeals affirmed. Capano did not appeal to the U.S. Supreme Court, bringing an end to his appeals.

== Death ==
Capano, aged 61, was found dead in his jail cell at 12:34 p.m. on September 19, 2011, by an officer performing a routine security check at the James T. Vaughn Correctional Center state prison in Smyrna, Delaware. The medical examiner determined that Capano died of sudden cardiac arrest. He also had "atherosclerotic and hypertensive cardiovascular disease, and that obesity was a contributing factor in his death". Following Capano's death, his brothers Louis and Joseph engaged in a bitter court fight over their family's multimillion-dollar real estate empire.

== Portrayals ==
Several books were written about the case, including Above the Law by Brian J Karem. Published by Pinnacle Books in September 1999; And Never Let Her Go: Thomas Capano: The Deadly Seducer by Ann Rule, The Summer Wind: Thomas Capano and the Murder of Anne Marie Fahey by George Anastasia, and Fatal Embrace: The Inside Story of the Thomas Capano/Anne Marie Fahey Murder Case by Cris Barrish and Peter Meyer. In 2001, a television movie based on Rule's book was made, And Never Let Her Go, starring Mark Harmon as Capano and Kathryn Morris as Fahey.

A 2000 episode of The FBI Files, titled "Deadly Obsession," and an episode of the CBS News documentary program 48 Hours featured the case. In 2012, the story was featured on Behind Mansion Walls. The case was portrayed in Law and Order season 11 in an episode titled "Ego". The case was also portrayed in "The Squeeze", the Season 1, Third Episode of the NBC series Boomtown (October 13, 2002). Also featured in a 2018 episode of Vanity Fair Confidential titled "The Secret of the Summer Wind."
