= List of people executed in the United States in 1996 =

Forty-five people, all male, were executed in the United States in 1996, thirty-six by lethal injection, seven by electrocution, one by hanging and one by firing squad. The last execution by hanging in the United States occurred this year. The state of Nevada carried out its first and currently only involuntary execution since 1961, that of Richard Allen Moran.

== List of people executed in the United States in 1996 ==
No.	Date of execution	Name	Age of person			Gender	Ethnicity	State	Method	Ref.
No.	Date of execution	Name	At execution	At offense	Age difference	Gender	Ethnicity	State	Method	Ref.
1	January 4, 1996	Walter Milton Correll Jr.	34	24	10	Male	White	Virginia	Lethal injection	
2	January 23, 1996	Richard Townes Jr.	45	34	11	Male	Black	Virginia	Lethal injection	
3	January 25, 1996	Billy Bailey	49	32	17	Male	White	Delaware	Hanging	
4	January 26, 1996	John Albert Taylor	36	30	6	Male	White	Utah	Firing squad	
5	January 30, 1996	William Henry Flamer	41	24	17	Male	Black	Delaware	Lethal injection	
6	February 9, 1996	Leo Ernest Jenkins Jr.	37	29	8	Male	White	Texas	Lethal injection	
7	February 16, 1996	Edward Dean Horsley Jr.	38	19	19	Male	Black	Alabama	Electrocution	
8	February 21, 1996	Jeffery Paul Sloan	29	19	10	Male	White	Missouri	Lethal injection	
9	February 23, 1996	William George Bonin	49	33	16	Male	White	California	Lethal injection	
10	February 27, 1996	Kenneth Granviel	45	24	21	Male	Black	Texas	Lethal injection	
11	March 1, 1996	Antonio G. James	42	24	18	Male	Black	Louisiana	Lethal injection	
12	March 30, 1996	Richard Allen Moran	42	30	12	Male	White	Nevada	Lethal injection	
13	April 10, 1996	Doyle James Williams	48	32	16	Male	White	Missouri	Lethal injection	
14	April 19, 1996	James B. Clark Jr.	39	37	2	Male	White	Delaware	Lethal injection	
15	April 26, 1996	Benjamin Brewer	38	20	18	Male	White	Oklahoma	Lethal injection	
16	May 3, 1996	Keith Daniel Williams	48	31	17	Male	White	California	Lethal injection	
17	May 31, 1996	Robert W. South	51	38	13	Male	White	South Carolina	Lethal injection	
18	June 19, 1996	Daren Lee Bolton	29	19	10	Male	White	Arizona	Lethal injection	
19	July 17, 1996	John Joseph Joubert IV	33	20	13	Male	White	Nebraska	Electrocution	
20	July 17, 1996	Joseph John Savino III	37	30	7	Male	White	Virginia	Lethal injection	
21	July 18, 1996	Tommie Joe Smith	42	26	16	Male	Black	Indiana	Lethal injection	
22	July 19, 1996	Frederick Herman Kornahrens III	47	36	11	Male	White	South Carolina	Lethal injection	
23	July 31, 1996	Emmett Clifton Nave	55	43	12	Male	Native American	Missouri	Lethal injection	
24	August 7, 1996	Thomas Henry Battle	34	18	16	Male	Black	Missouri	Lethal injection	
25	August 8, 1996	William Frank Parker	41	30	11	Male	White	Arkansas	Lethal injection	
26	August 9, 1996	Steven Keith Hatch	42	26	16	Male	White	Oklahoma	Lethal injection	
27	August 21, 1996	Richard Dennis Oxford	39	30	9	Male	White	Missouri	Lethal injection	
28	August 22, 1996	Luis Morine Mata	45	25	20	Male	Hispanic	Arizona	Lethal injection	
29	September 6, 1996	Michael Rian Torrence	35	25	10	Male	White	South Carolina	Lethal injection	
30	September 6, 1996	Douglas Franklin Wright	56	51	5	Male	White	Oregon	Lethal injection	
31	September 18, 1996	Raymond Lee Stewart	44	29	15	Male	Black	Illinois	Lethal injection	
32	September 18, 1996	Joe Fedelfido Gonzales Jr.	35	31	4	Male	Hispanic	Texas	Lethal injection	
33	October 4, 1996	Larry Gene Bell	46	35	11	Male	White	South Carolina	Electrocution	
34	October 21, 1996	John Earl Bush	38	23	15	Male	Black	Florida	Electrocution	
35	November 14, 1996	Larry Grant Lonchar	45	35	10	Male	White	Georgia	Electrocution	
36	November 15, 1996	Doyle Cecil Lucas	41	28	13	Male	White	South Carolina	Lethal injection	
37	November 15, 1996	Ellis Wayne Felker	48	33	15	Male	White	Georgia	Electrocution	
38	November 21, 1996	Ronald Bernard Bennett	42	31	11	Male	Black	Virginia	Lethal injection	
39	November 22, 1996	Frank Middleton Jr.	33	21	12	Male	Black	South Carolina	Lethal injection	
40	December 3, 1996	Gregory Warren Beaver	30	19	11	Male	White	Virginia	Lethal injection	
41	December 6, 1996	John Mills Jr.	41	27	14	Male	Black	Florida	Electrocution	
42	December 10, 1996	Larry Allen Stout	33	23	10	Male	Black	Virginia	Lethal injection	
43	December 11, 1996	Richard Steven Zeitvogel	40	27	13	Male	White	Missouri	Lethal injection	
44	December 12, 1996	Lem Davis Tuggle Jr.	44	31	13	Male	White	Virginia	Lethal injection	
45	December 16, 1996	Ronald Lee Hoke Sr.	39	28	11	Male	White	Virginia	Lethal injection	
		Average:	41 years	28 years	13 years					

== Demographics ==
Gender
Male	45	100%
Female	0	0%
Ethnicity
White	29	64%
Black	13	29%
Hispanic	2	4%
Native American	1	2%
State
Virginia	8	18%
Missouri	6	13%
South Carolina	6	13%
Delaware	3	7%
Texas	3	7%
Arizona	2	4%
California	2	4%
Florida	2	4%
Georgia	2	4%
Oklahoma	2	4%
Alabama	1	2%
Arkansas	1	2%
Illinois	1	2%
Indiana	1	2%
Louisiana	1	2%
Nebraska	1	2%
Nevada	1	2%
Oregon	1	2%
Utah	1	2%
Method
Lethal injection	36	80%
Electrocution	7	16%
Firing squad	1	2%
Hanging	1	2%
Month
January	5	11%
February	5	11%
March	2	4%
April	3	7%
May	2	4%
June	1	2%
July	5	11%
August	5	11%
September	4	9%
October	2	4%
November	5	11%
December	6	13%
Age
20–29	2	4%
30–39	17	38%
40–49	23	51%
50–59	3	7%
Total	45	100%

== Executions in recent years ==
Number of executions
1997	74
1996	45
1995	56
Total	175

Preceded by 1995	List of people executed in the United States in 1996	Succeeded by 1997
