= James B. Clark Jr. =

American murderer (1957–1996)

- Born: February 8, 1957; Seaford, Delaware, U.S.
- Died: April 19, 1996 (aged 39); James T. Vaughn Correctional Center, Delaware, U.S.
- Status: Executed by lethal injection
- Convictions: First degree murder (2 counts); Abduction of a child under the age of 12; Assault with intent to commit murder Third degree assault Possession of a deadly weapon during the commission of a felony (2 counts); Possession of a deadly weapon by a prohibited person (2 counts)
- Penalty: Death

James B. Clark Jr. (February 8, 1957 – April 19, 1996) was an inmate executed in the State of Delaware for the murder of his adoptive parents. Clark confessed to the crime. He was motivated by a desire for the couple's life insurance. The murders took place on May 22, 1994, one month after he had been released on parole for an earlier conviction. Clark had served 21 years of a 30-year sentence for his attempted slaying of a 3-year-old girl in 1973, but in spite of his failure to participate in rehabilitation and repeated discipline by prison authorities for fighting, he was released for good behavior. His case inspired public outrage and proposed legislation to curtail unwarranted early release.

== Execution ==
On September 9, 1994, Clark pleaded guilty to two counts of first degree murder. He was sentenced to death. After waiving his appeals, Clark was executed by lethal injection on April 19, 1996.

== See also ==
- Capital punishment in Delaware
- Capital punishment in the United States
- List of people executed in Delaware
- List of people executed in the United States in 1996
