= Steven Brian Pennell =

American serial killer

- Pennell on November 30, 1988
- Born: November 22, 1957; Glasgow, Delaware, U.S.
- Died: March 14, 1992 (aged 34); James T. Vaughn Correctional Center, Delaware, U.S.
- Other names: The Route 40 Killer; The Corridor Killer; The Route 13 Killer
- Status: Executed by lethal injection
- Conviction: First degree murder (2 counts)
- Penalty: Death (October 31, 1991)

Details
- Victims: 2 convicted, 5 total suspected
- Span of crimes: 1987–1988
- Country: United States
- State: Delaware
- Date apprehended: November 29, 1988

Steven Brian Pennell (November 22, 1957 – March 14, 1992), known as The Route 40 Killer, was an American serial killer. He was Delaware's only known serial killer in modern history, being convicted of the murders of two New Castle County, Delaware women and suspected of killing three others. He abducted most of his victims from U.S. Route 40, near Bear.

== Murders ==
=== Shirley Ellis ===
The first victim was 23-year-old Shirley Anna Ellis, a nurse. On November 29, 1987, she left Wilmington Hospital around 6 PM, where she was assisting an AIDS patient, catching a lift on her way home on Route 40. Her body was later found by the roadside by two boys. She was partially nude, her legs spread out, hands and feet tied with adhesive tape. There were no signs of sexual assault, but she had been seriously abused, and mutilated, with her killer tying a string around her neck and hitting her head with a hammer before she died.

=== Catherine DiMauro ===
The second victim was 31-year-old Catherine A. DiMauro. On June 28, 1988, about seven months after the first murder, around 11:30 PM, she was seen walking down Route 40. At 6:25 AM, construction workers found her naked body at a construction site. No signs of sexual assault were found. Like Ellis, she was killed by hammer blows and strangulation, but unlike the first murder, DiMauro's body was covered in blue fibers.

Special police forces, along with the FBI's profiling unit, concluded that a serial killer was operating in close proximity to Route 40. Police and federal agents disguised as sex workers in attempt to gather information, with a task force of over 60 people being formed solely to capture the killer, but to no avail.

=== Margaret Lynn Finner ===
On August 22, 1988, 27-year-old sex worker Margaret Lynn Finner (née Jordan) disappeared. A number of witnesses had seen her enter a blue Ford driven by a white male near Route 13.

About three months later, her body was found by a hunter near the Chesapeake-Delaware Canal. Her body was so badly decomposed that the exact cause of death could not be determined, although signs of torture were visible on her remains. Finner was identified using dental records.

=== Michelle Gordon ===
On September 18, 22-year-old Michelle Gordon, a local sex worker known for frequenting Route 40, was seen to enter a blue Ford van associated with Pennell. On September 20, her body was found on the rocks in the Chesapeake-Delaware Canal. In the autopsy, it was discovered that she had been drugged with cocaine, which had caused her heart to stop while she was being tortured.

=== Kathleen Meyer ===
On September 23, 26-year-old Kathleen Anne Meyer, of Brookmont Farms, disappeared. A police officer saw her get into a blue Ford on Route 40, at 9:30 PM. He was able to write down the license plate number, which turned out to belong to Pennell's car. Her body was never found.

== Capture, trial, and execution ==
On September 14, 1988, Renée Taschner, an undercover police officer posing as a sex worker, roamed Route 40 in an attempt to capture the killer. After passing several vehicles, she spotted a blue Ford seven times in 20 minutes. She went to a more isolated area, and the vehicle stopped next to her. The driver was white, with Taschner noticing that the floor had a blue carpet. The man appeared nervous, hardly looking her in the eyes, but still attempted to convince her to enter the car. She refused, claiming that she was tired, but managed to tear some fiber from the blue carpet and write down the license plate number. Upon examination of several license plates, it emerged that the vehicle belonged to Stephen Brian Pennell, a 31-year-old electrician, married and father of two, with no criminal record.

Delaware public prosecutor Charles Oberly approved a police search warrant of the panel van, while at the same time searching for other offences for which they could arrest Pennell. While searching the vehicle, prints matching the blood and hair of the victims, as well as the same adhesive tape used in the DiMauro killing, were found. A "torture kit" was also found, which included pliers, whips, handcuffs, needles, knives and restraints. Pennell was arrested on November 29, 1988, a year after he murdered the first victim, and was charged with killing three - Ellis, DiMauro and Gordon. He decided to invoke his right to remain silent.

=== Trial and conviction ===
At the start of the trial, a panel of defense attorneys claimed that the initial fiber taken by Officer Taschner was obtained illegally because it was taken from his car. Judge Richard Gebelein dismissed these allegations, saying that the carpet was visible to Taschner's eyes as soon as she opened the vehicle, so evidence from these fibers was legal. Once the fibers were examined, it was shown that they had DNA residues belonging to the victims. It was the first trial in the United States that used DNA evidence as absolute legal evidence. Gebelein had to set a legal precedent and listen to the opinions of experts and scientists, who helped verify the DNA evidence.

On November 23, 1989, the jury reached a decision and convicted Pennell of murdering DiMauro and Ellis, but acquitted him of Gordon's murder because of lack of evidence. The jury decided not to recommend the death penalty, but two life sentences. Shortly after the decision, a bouquet of flowers was sent to the prosecutor's office, with a note reading: "You made us feel human again, from the women of Route 40."

Pennell's lawyer appealed the court's decision on the grounds that the fiber was obtained illegally. The court dismissed it, and based on new evidence introduced in the case, convicted Pennell of murdering Gordon and Meyer. At this point, Pennell dismissed his lawyer and asked to represent himself, a decision the court approved. In a surprising move, he announced that he wished to receive the death penalty. He argued that the entire constitution began with a verse from the Hebrew Bible, and as soon as the court found two witnesses who could testify to his guilt, he deserved the death penalty under the Bible's laws. He cited two passages from the Bible to explain his position.

On October 31, 1991, the court sentenced Pennell to death. Under the Delaware State Constitution, every death penalty judgment requires a further hearing from the Supreme Court, and on February 11, 1992, Pennell appeared before them, demanding that he be sentenced to death. He was the only defendant in Delaware's legal history to represent himself before the Supreme Court, and the only man convicted to willingly seek a death sentence.

However, he pleaded not guilty to the murders, and spoke of the murderer in the third person, saying that the killer was enjoying the process of the murder, but not the murder itself. The Delaware State Attorney General objected to the death penalty, but the judges sentenced Pennell to death anyway. His execution was scheduled for March 14, 1992.

Two people appealed against Pennell's execution, but both were unanimously dismissed by the court. His wife, Vera Catherine Pennell, appealed the Supreme Court's decision. She received help from the local branch of the American Citizens Association, and a law professor who was one of its directors. He argued in his appeal that Pennell was insane and could not fully understand the gravity of his actions, so the trial should be reopened, with Pennell being barred from representing himself. The Supreme Court rejected the demand.

=== Execution ===
Prior to the execution, numerous reporters tried to ask Pennell for exclusive interviews, hoping to reveal the location of Meyer's body. He turned down every request. When it came close to his execution date, he agreed to be interviewed by one newspaper, with his lawyer present. During this interview, Pennell revealed no new information, nor where he had hidden Meyer's body.

On March 14, 1992, at 9:49 a.m, Pennell was executed by lethal injection, becoming the first person executed in Delaware in 46 years, and the 165th person to be executed in the United States since the death penalty was resumed in 1976. His last meal consisted of crab cakes, steaks, corn on the cob, french fries, bread and butter and a cola.

== See also ==
- List of people executed in Delaware
- List of people executed in the United States in 1992
- List of serial killers in the United States
- Volunteer (capital punishment)
