= Stephen Ballard =

Stephen Ballard may refer to:

- Stephen Ballard (police officer) (1985–2017), Delaware State Police officer
- Stephen Ballard (philanthropist) (1815–1901), American businessman and philanthropist

== See also ==
- Steven Ballard, chancellor at East Carolina University
