= List of people executed in Delaware =

The following is a list of people executed by the U.S. state of Delaware since capital punishment was resumed in the United States in 1976.

All of the 16 people were convicted of murder and have been executed at the James T. Vaughn Correctional Center, near Smyrna, Delaware. Capital punishment was abolished in Delaware on August 2, 2016.

== List of people executed in Delaware since 1976 ==
No.	Name	Race	Age	Sex	Date of execution	County	Method	Victim(s)	Governor
1	Steven Brian Pennell	White	34	M	March 14, 1992	New Castle	Lethal injection	Shirley Ellis and Catherine DiMauro	Michael Castle
2	James Allen Red Dog	Native American	39	M	March 3, 1993	New Castle	Lethal injection	Hugh Pennington (Note: Red Dog killed 4 additional people in Montana, California & Illinois)	Thomas Carper
3	Kenneth W. DeShields	Black	33	M	August 31, 1993	Sussex	Lethal injection	Elizabeth Reed	Thomas Carper
4	Andre S. Deputy	Black	45	M	June 23, 1994	Kent	Lethal injection	Byard Smith and Alberta Smith	Thomas Carper
5	Nelson W. Shelton	White	27	M	March 17, 1995	New Castle	Lethal injection	Wilson Mannon Jr.	Thomas Carper
6	Billy Bailey	White	49	M	January 25, 1996	Kent	Hanging	Gilbert Lamberton and Clara Lamberton	Thomas Carper
7	William Henry Flamer	Black	41	M	January 30, 1996	Kent	Lethal injection	Byard Smith and Alberta Smith	Thomas Carper
8	James B. Clark Jr.	White	39	M	April 19, 1996	New Castle	Lethal injection	Elizabeth Clark and James Clark Sr.	Thomas Carper
9	David J. Lawrie	White	37	M	April 23, 1999	Kent	Lethal injection	4 murder victims (Note: The 4 victims were: Michelle Lawrie, Fawn Lawrie, Tabitha Lawrie, and Charles Humbertson.)	Thomas Carper
10	Willie G. Sullivan	Black	28	M	September 24, 1999	Kent	Lethal injection	Maurice Dodd	Thomas Carper
11	Dwayne L. Weeks	Black	37	M	November 17, 2000	New Castle	Lethal injection	Gwendolyn Weeks and Craig Williams	Thomas Carper
12	David F. Dawson	White	46	M	April 26, 2001	Kent	Lethal injection	Madeline Marie Kisner	Ruth Ann Minner
13	Abdullah Tanzil Hameen (Note: Formerly known as Cornelius Ferguson.)	Black	37	M	May 25, 2001	New Castle	Lethal injection	Troy Hodges	Ruth Ann Minner
14	Brian David Steckel	White	36	M	November 4, 2005	New Castle	Lethal injection	Sandra Lee Long	Ruth Ann Minner
15	Robert W. Jackson III	White	38	M	July 29, 2011	New Castle	Lethal injection	Elizabeth Girardi	Jack A. Markell
16	Shannon M. Johnson	Black	28	M	April 20, 2012	New Castle	Lethal injection	Cameron Hamlin	Jack A. Markell

== Demographics ==
Race
White	8	50%
Black	7	44%
Native American	1	6%
Age
20–29	3	19%
30–39	9	56%
40–49	4	25%
Sex
Male	16	100%
Date of execution
1974–1979	0	0%
1980–1989	0	0%
1990–1999	10	63%
2000–2009	4	25%
2010–2019	2	12%
Method
Lethal injection	15	94%
Hanging	1	6%
Governor (Party)
Sherman W. Tribbitt (D)	0	0%
Pete du Pont (R)	0	0%
Mike Castle (R)	1	6%
Dale E. Wolf (R)	0	0%
Tom Carper (D)	10	63%
Ruth Ann Minner (D)	3	19%
Jack Markell (D)	2	12%
John C. Carney (D)	0	0%
Total	16	100%

== See also ==
- Capital punishment in Delaware
- Capital punishment in the United States
- List of people executed in Delaware (pre-1972) – executions before Furman
