= James Allen Red Dog =

American serial killer (1954–1993)

- Born: February 1, 1954; Poplar, Montana, U.S.
- Died: March 3, 1993 (aged 39); James T. Vaughn Correctional Center, Delaware, U.S.
- Status: Executed by lethal injection
- Convictions: Federal; Robbery; California; Second degree murder (2 counts); Delaware; First degree murder First degree unlawful sexual intercourse (4 counts); First degree kidnapping Possession of a deadly weapon during the commission of a felony (2 counts)
- Penalty: Federal; 15 years imprisonment California; 9 years imprisonment Delaware; Death

Details
- Victims: 5
- Span of crimes: 1973–1991
- Country: United States
- States: Montana, California, Illinois, Delaware

James Allen Red Dog (February 1, 1954 – March 3, 1993) was a Sioux and Assiniboine multiple murderer from Fort Peck Indian Reservation who was executed at his own request for murdering Hugh Pennington in Delaware. As a result of his crimes, then-Senator Joe Biden introduced legislation that required states to be notified by federal officials when dangerous criminals were placed in their jurisdictions.

== Early life ==
Red Dog's heritage was a mix of (Dakota) Sioux and Assiniboine. He was a member of the Dakota tribe, and grew up on Fort Peck Reservation in Poplar, in northeast Montana. He blamed poverty on his reservation for his crimes later in life; he said that there were no jobs and he could only make a living on crime. According to a family acquaintance, who asked not to be named, at age 8 or 10 Red Dog tried to emulate the lifestyle of an older half-brother whom he admired, who as of 1993 was in a federal prison. The acquaintance also said that life had "very little" to offer Red Dog.

Delaware deputy attorneys Steven P. Wood and Peggy J. Hageman, who prosecuted Red Dog, tried and failed to find a motive. According to Wood, attributing Red Dog's behavior to his upbringing is too easy: "There is no denying the privation Native Americans are subjected to on reservations, but the simple fact is there are hundreds of thousands of Native Americans raised in those conditions, and precious few become multiple murderers", he said, as well as that his killings were "essentially motiveless."

Red Dog had told companions that he was a "terminator". He also said, "I hurt people."

Six of Red Dog's eight sisters, however, said he was not a "multiple and motiveless killer". They also said, "The people of Delaware should be thankful that our brother ... is willing to give his life, like a man, instead of spending thousands and thousands of the taxpayers' money on appeals. Would you be brave enough to walk the walk he's about to take?"

== Later life ==
Red Dog once told a television interviewer that since his first serious crime, an armed robbery in 1973, he had been "prepared to die". Along with two other men, Steven Wayne Lilley and Ralph James Clancy, he robbed a liquor and pizza store on the reservation. During the robbery in the early morning of October 4, he shot and killed the owner, 39-year-old William Clark Veseth.

All three men were charged with first degree murder. Clancy pleaded guilty to robbery and was sentenced to six years in prison. Lilley was found guilty of first degree murder and sentenced to life in prison, but acquitted after a retrial in 1975. Red Dog was convicted of involuntary manslaughter and robbery. The verdict contradicted federal law, under which he should've been found guilty of first degree murder under the felony murder rule. Frustrated by the lesser verdict, the judge dismissed the manslaughter conviction against Red Dog, but sentenced him to 15 years in prison for the robbery, the statutory maximum for the charge. Red Dog had initially proclaimed his innocence, but admitted to firing the fatal shot at the retrial of his accomplice Lilley. He could not be retried for murder under double jeopardy.

In 1977, while on furlough from jail to attend a Native American ceremony, he escaped and fled with a companion to Los Angeles, where they met two Native American men in a bar who offered to lodge them for the night; they stabbed the men to death in their sleep. Red Dog pleaded guilty to two counts of second degree murder, but was given a sentence concurrent with armed robbery; Wood said it was "mind-boggling" that he served no extra time for the murder. In 1983, while in an Illinois prison, he provided heroin to kill Joe Ortega, a prison gang member who had offended other inmates.

In exchange for testifying against the other inmates and being a witness in an investigation about prison gangs and the militant American Indian Movement, Red Dog was placed in the Federal Witness Protection Program, and released on parole on June 27, 1990. After his release, he was relocated to Delaware, where he would murder Hugh Pennington less than eight months later. Before the murder, Red Dog taught Sioux traditions to Delaware's Nanticoke Indians.

At the time he killed Hugh Pennington, a 30-year-old motel night auditor and friend of Red Dog's wife Bonnie Red Dog, he was living outside Wilmington with Bonnie who worked as a secretary; Pennington and his mother lived nearby. Pennington also worked at the Tally Ho Motor Lodge with Bonnie.

In February 1991, Red Dog drove north to Pennington's suburban Wilmington home in New Castle County. He appeared in Pennington's kitchen on February 9, 1991, after a day spent drinking. He woke Pennington, still in pajamas, and forced him into a basement workshop. According to Wood, Pennington said or did "something very minor" that in Red Dog's homicidal state was enough to enrage him. Red Dog tied his wrists and ankles with duct tape and electrical cord, and forced him to lie on his back on the floor, then cut his throat. According to prosecutors he took off his boots so they wouldn't be stained with blood. He nearly decapitated Pennington with his knife; the wound was 6 inches deep.

During the next 12 hours, Red Dog kidnapped a 52-year-old female witness, raped her in her home, then forced her to drive him to southern Delaware where he raped her again, a total of four times. She escaped and called police.

Four days later, police caught Red Dog 100 miles from where he was last seen, walking across Winchester Bridge in Wilmington. He had a strange odor; he later told his lawyer that he had smeared himself with deer feces to divert police dogs. When charged with first-degree murder, kidnapping and four counts of rape, he pleaded no contest, saying he had been so drunk that he did not remember the killing. He could not think of a motive either, blaming childhood poverty and life in prison. He suggested in the television interview that Pennington might have done something to trigger hate he developed in prison.

== Execution ==
Red Dog pleaded guilty and requested a death sentence. After being sentenced to death in April 1992, he refused to appeal, as it would violate his warrior's code. He told a judge he wanted "no appeals or motions for stay of execution". Red Dog's family supported his decision not to fight the sentence. His relatives said he was going to his death with dignity and was "proud that he's giving in return for what he took: a life".

Red Dog became the second convict to be executed since Delaware reinstated executions in 1992. Steven Brian Pennell, executed in March 1992, was the first; prior to that, none had taken place since 1946. Red Dog decried the "festive" atmosphere of the Pennell execution and said he hoped "that my execution will be conducted with more solemnity than a circus act!"

Edward C. Pankowski Jr., Red Dog's lawyer and a former prosecutor who joined the public defender's office, tried in vain to convince Red Dog to appeal the sentence. At the hearing to determine Red Dog's sentence he told Pankowski not to present mitigating evidence.

The Delaware Superior Court judge rejected motion by lawyers to block his execution. His lawyers, who were public defenders, filed a motion asking the court to order psychiatric and psychological tests to determine if he was mentally competent to request execution; Judge Norman A. Barron said that he found "no substantial showing that Red Dog is currently incompetent" and that the court would respect Red Dog's "rationally based wishes".

Red Dog wrote in court papers in 1992 that he "[wanted] to expedite this for the families", both his and those of his victims. The defense attorney said he did not have a trial because he expressed a lot of remorse and wanted to spare the Pennington family the "whole trial stage".

He was to have received his lethal injection in July 1992, as ordered by Judge Barron, but under Delaware law the death sentence was automatically appealed to the State Supreme Court, so Judge Barron's ruling was not upheld until November; the case was rescheduled for March 3.

Red Dog sent for John H. Morsette, 52, a tribal medicine man he said he met almost a decade before at a Native American purification ceremony in Montana. Prison officials were initially reluctant to have Morsette inside the chamber, saying only a prison chaplain was allowed there, but they eventually approved it. Morsette, also from Poplar, Montana, said he did not remember meeting Red Dog but would come to pray with him to prepare him for the Sioux afterlife. He conducted Native American rites over Red Dog for about two minutes and placed a necklace over his head.

Red Dog was executed by lethal injection on March 3 at the State Correctional Center near Smyrna, Delaware, 15 miles (24 km) north of Dover. He was 39 years old at the time.

After receiving last rites from Morsette, Red Dog said "I'd like to thank my family and friends and [attorney Edward] Pankowski for supporting me and all others who treated me with kindness". As the drugs were administered, he choked and told his wife "I'm going home, babe".

At about 10 a.m., his final words were to thank his supporters and curse the rest of the witnesses. According to witnesses he died with his left eye open. He was pronounced dead at 10:28 a.m. Red Dog's body was released to be transported by Amtrak train in Wilmington, Delaware to Wolf Point, Montana shortly thereafter. Because of the special circumstances, Amtrak I. A. Supervisor Kenneth Wilson was delegated to accompany the remains back to the final destination.

== Victims ==
- William Veseth - October 4, 1973, Wolf Point, Montana
- Stanley Large Jr. - August 10, 1977, California
- Moses Alex John - August 10, 1977, California
- Joseph Ortega - February 20, 1983, Marion, Illinois
- Hugh Pennington - February 9, 1991, New Castle County, Delaware

== Aftermath ==
Steven Wood, Delaware state prosecutor, said that an earlier execution would have saved the lives of four of Red Dog's victims.

As a result of Red Dog's crimes, then-Delaware Senator Joe Biden introduced legislation that required federal officials to notify states when dangerous criminals were placed in their jurisdictions.

== See also ==
- List of people executed in Delaware
- List of people executed in the United States in 1993
- List of serial killers in the United States

Executions carried out in Delaware
Preceded by Steven Brian Pennell March 14, 1992	James Allen Red Dog; March 3, 1993	Succeeded by Kenneth W. DeShields August 31, 1993
Executions carried out in the United States
Preceded by John George Brewer – Arizona March 3, 1993	James Allen Red Dog – Delaware; March 3, 1993	Succeeded by Robert Sawyer – Louisiana March 5, 1993
