= Murder of Wilson Mannon =

1992 murder in Wilmington, Delaware

Wilson Mannon Jr.
- Wilson Mannon (left) and his brother, Paul (right), in 1986
- Born: January 5, 1928; Delaware, U.S.
- Died: January 12, 1992 (aged 64); Wilmington, Delaware, U.S.
- Cause of death: Blunt force trauma
- Spouse: Mary Lou Hutchins
- Children: 3

Nelson in 1992

Steven in 1992 and in the mid-2000s

Jack in 1992 and in the mid-2000s

Wilson Mannon Jr. (January 5, 1928 – January 12, 1992) was an American man who was robbed and murdered by three career criminals in Delaware.

The perpetrators were brothers Nelson Shelton (July 20, 1967 – March 17, 1995) and Steven W. Shelton (born July 11, 1965), and their cousin Jack Foster Outten Jr. (born March 23, 1966). All three men were convicted of first degree murder and sentenced to death. Nelson was executed in 1995 after waiving his appeals, while Steven and Outten eventually won appeals, and had their sentences reduced to lengthy prison terms in plea agreements years later.

The case drew attention after Steven donated one of his kidneys to his ailing mother, Vessa Shelton. Nelson had wanted to donate his own kidney, but his was found to be incompatible. Steven donated one in his brother's place.

== Backgrounds ==
Wilson Mannon Jr. was born in Delaware on January 5, 1928, to Wilson Cummins Mannon and Mary Hanifee. He worked at Wall Board Distributions in Newark, Delaware. Mannon previously delivered drywall for 30 years.

Mannon had three sons, Bobby Lee Mannon, Steven Allen Mannon and Dennis Wayne Mannon, a stepson, Patrick D. Norton, a stepdaughter, Nora S. Norris, and five grandchildren. He also had a brother, Paul, and a sister, Betty Butler.

The Shelton brothers and Outten all grew up in dysfunctional households.

The Shelton brothers were raised in a three bedroom house with 10 other half-brothers and sisters. The family suffered from serious financial problems due to the father losing his legs in an industrial accident. The father of the Shelton brothers was an alcoholic, who was physically, verbally, and emotionally abusive to the children. Because of this abuse, the children were taken away from home and placed in foster care numerous times. According to Steven, he could never do anything right in his father's eyes and was never able to gain his approval. Steven was regularly whipped with a belt or a paddle.

Their mother, Vessa Shelton, was also an alcoholic, and frequently abused them and the other children.

All of Steven's older brothers became involved in criminal activity as juveniles or adults and went to a reform school or prison. They were raised in a racially mixed neighborhood with severe racial tension, and Steven was often assaulted in his neighborhood.

Steven was reportedly happy when he was younger before he began experiencing great difficulty in school. He was a target of bullying since he wore glasses, and started to become a truant regularly at the age of 10. When Steven was 13, he was sent to a reform school for truancy.

Despite their issues, Nelson and Steven maintained close and positive relationships with their mother and all of their siblings. When Vessa became ill from a kidney transplant, they took care of her.

During his trial, Outten described his as a close family, but said he was "semi-abused." He said his father, who was beaten during a robbery in 1974 and suffered communication problems as a result, was not affectionate and was abusive when he was drunk, resulting in him running away. Outten said he'd lived in foster care, but left after he was accused of stealing. As his father's health deteriorated, Outten cared for him until his death.

== Early crimes ==
When Steven was 15, he was charged with second degree rape. In 1982, he was found guilty and sentenced to 8 years in prison. In 1985, Steven's sentence was increased after he was convicted of assaulting a fellow inmate.

In 1985, Nelson was charged with second degree rape. He pleaded guilty to sexual assault and was sentenced to five months in jail and a year of probation. In 1985, Nelson and another man stole a customer's car from a convenience store. He went on the run for two weeks before being arrested in Tennessee. Nelson pleaded guilty to first degree robbery, second degree forgery, and three counts of theft, and was sentenced to four years and six months in prison, followed by two years of probation. Overall, Nelson was arrested 11 times between 1976 and 1985.

The father of the Shelton brothers died on February 12, 1990, while both of them were still in prison. They were allowed to temporarily leave prison to attend his funeral. The two reportedly became depressed after their father's death, having looked up to him as a strong-willed individual despite his abuse.

Nelson was paroled on May 11, 1991, and was on parole at the time of the murder.

After his release from prison, Steven was re-arrested in 1991 and 1992 for robbery and a DUI offense.

Outten had a lengthy criminal history as well, but did not have a history of violence. He had prior convictions for burglary, and seven convictions for other non-violent crimes. Outten was also on parole at the time of the murder, and had been on unsecured bail for pending criminal charges of burglary, theft, criminal mischief, and forgery.

== Murder and investigation ==
On January 11, 1992, the Shelton brothers, Outten, and Nelson's girlfriend, Christine Gibbons, spent the afternoon drinking beer at Gibbons home in Newark. Outten bought the beer using his unemployment check. At dusk, after drinking about one and one-half entire cases of beer, the four drove to a local tavern in Nelson's car in Wilmington. On the way there, they discussed a plan for Gibbons to pretend to be a prostitute to lure men out of the bar so that the rest of the group could rob them.

After arriving at the tavern, the four continued to drink beer. A patron came over and spoke with Outten about buying drugs. The four and the patron left the tavern for another building where Nelson used to work, where they exchanged $25 for drugs.

The four then drove to another bar, where they used their recently earned money to buy more drinks. Nelson and Gibbons got in an argument after Nelson became jealous of her dancing with Steven and Outten. Gibbons said that Nelson punched her in the stomach during the argument.

Afterwards, the group went to a different bar, but Nelson and Gibbons continued to argue in the parking lot. Eventually, they resolved their differences and all went inside. Gibbons started talking to Wilson Mannon. Mannon, who was also drinking heavily, bought drinks for Gibbons and danced with her while Outten and the Shelton brothers played pool.

Sometime after midnight, Outten called his girlfriend, Karen Julian, and asked her to pick him up from the bar, saying he didn't want to go with the rest of the group. However, she refused.

Around the time of the last call, the rest of the group joined Mannon and Gibbons. Mannon had run out of money, but the group was still served one last round of drinks. After the bar closed, they left together. After talking with him in the parking lot, they agreed to give him a ride.

Nelson drove the group to a desolate area in Wilmington. Mannon's body was found there in the morning. The top of his head had been completely smashed, with blood, brain matter, and skull fragments lying around his head. His wallet was empty, and loose change was found near his body. A broken hammer was found next to his body, and the hammer's head was found at a nearby fence.

The following day, Gibbons called her social worker and confessed to the murder. She said the Shelton brothers and Outten had taken turns beating Mannon to death, laughing as they killed him. The three men were arrested the same day and charged with first degree murder. It was later discovered that hours after the murder, Nelson went to the house of an 85-year-old woman he knew under the pretense of fixing her car, before attacking her 60-year-old son and tying him up, before trying to rape her. Afterwards, he stole her car.

The prosecution announced they would seek death sentences for all three men. Gibbons talked to the police, giving multiple, some contradicting, accounts of the events preceding the murder. She was not charged after maintaining that she had pleaded with the others to stop attacking Mannon, but had been ignored.

In her original account to the police, Gibbons said Steven and Outten had kicked Mannon, but insisted that Nelson didn't hurt him. She said a sink-like object had been taken from the side of the road and used to bludgeon Mannon to death. The group also took money from Mannon's wallet and stole his rings. The sink-like object was later placed in the trunk of the car and discarded by the group as they were driving home. After the four returned home, they showered, washed their clothes, and bleached their shoes. Gibbons said she tried to call a friend to tell her what happened, but Nelson caught her, ripped the phone from the wall and struck her.

In a second statement, Gibbons implicated Nelson instead of Steven, and revealed that she was several months pregnant at the time of the murder, saying Nelson was the father. She also said that Nelson had previously raped her. Gibbons then told Steven's lawyer that she'd implicated his client instead of Nelson since she loved and feared him, and claimed it was Steven who fathered the baby, which she had since aborted. Gibbons said she had a one-night stand with Steven since Nelson was seeing other women. She told Steven's lawyer that she'd initially implicated Steven since Nelson threatened to rape and murder her if she talked.

== Trial ==
The Shelton brothers and Outten were tried together in February 1993. Gibbons testified during their trial. Initially, she only implicated Outten and Nelson. After finishing her testimony, however, Gibbons asked if she could retake the witness stand, saying she lied. The judge allowed her to recount all of her prior testimony. Gibbon's new testimony mirrored her previous statements, but this time, as she'd initially told her caseworker when she talked about the murder for the first time, she implicated all three men in Mannon's murder. Gibbons said "they all three started beating on him", and that she saw Steven kick and punch Mannon in the face. Nelson's lawyer tried to have Gibbons charged with perjury, and the judge ordered a female police officer to keep watch on her house throughout the duration of the trial. On one occasion, she was placed in jail after refusing to get out of bed. On another, two detectives chased her across the street.

Gibbons said she initially gave a differing version of events since she had conflicting feelings about the Shelton brothers and both loved and was scared of Nelson. She said she'd wanted to correct her testimony out of fairness, and that Steven had instructed her to say he was not present for the murder.

The defense team for the Shelton brothers and Outten presented various theories to the jury. Nelson's attorney blamed Steven and Outten, while Steven's attorney blamed Nelson and Outten. Outten's lawyer blamed Gibbons. Ultimately, all three of them were convicted of first degree murder.

During the sentencing phase, the prosecution pointed to the brutality of Mannon's murder and the lengthy criminal records of the trio in arguing they deserved to die. Going through their criminal histories, Deputy Attorney General James Ropp said "When the Sheltons and Jack Outten want something, they don't care about the rules of society, they don't care about the laws, they just take it."

Ropp conceded that the Shelton brothers and Outten had miserable childhoods, and said it was considerable mitigation. However, he went on to say "but how mitigating is that? Lots of people have had rough lives, losing family members." He pointed out that one of the Sheltons' sisters, Dorothy Shaw, became a successful realtor, and that Edward Shelton, a half-brother, is now a computer drafter. "Every individual makes their own life," he said. "The three defendants have shown a total inability to follow the rules and laws of society. The state submits it's not a close call."

Nelson refused to present any mitigating evidence, saying he would rather die than spend the rest of his life in prison.

Steven refused to apologize and asked his lawyer not to beg for his life. However, he did present three witnesses in his defense: his half-brother, Edward, his half-sister, Dorothy, and his half-sister, Louise. Each of them talked about his troubled past and difficult childhood. Steven himself made a brief allocution statement to the jury:

"Ladies and gentlemen of the jury, I stand before you not to plead for my life. I feel that's wrong and improper and basically disrespectful to the victim's family and to mine. The State has painted a picture, and that picture is not very pretty, pertaining to me and my co-defendants. And I would just like to present to the jury a different side or a different meaning to Steven Shelton. The State has pictured me as being a monster, as being a rapist, as being a violent individual, but as you heard from my family, that's not so. The State only presents one side of the picture. There's two sides to every story. And the State just presents a negative side. The jury has found me guilty of these allegations, and now it's the jury's turn to render a verdict. And that verdict is either life in jail or death. Again, I'm not here to plead for my life, but just ask the jury to be fair in their decisions. That's all I have to say."

Outten was the only one of the trio to present a substantial defense during the sentencing phase. He called his mother, two sisters, brother, friend, and Julian to testify on his behalf. Outten's family members mostly discussed his troubled upbringing. His mother talked about some of his crimes, including an attack on his sister.

During his allocution statement, Outten talked about his lengthy criminal record. He also reviewed his criminal record. "To say I have a record is an understatement," Outten said. "It's an album." His criminal record covered 17 pages and contained 146 charges, many of which did not result in convictions. However, Outten pointed out that unlike the Shelton brothers, he had no convictions for violent crimes. He blamed his problems on his upbringing and his drug addiction. He talked about his first son, who he'd had with Julian. The baby had died after 16 days. Outten's family said he was deeply affected by his father's death. According to his sister, he'd "cried like she had never seen before." Julian said that Outten's loss of their first son had devastated him as well.

Outten talked about his upbringing. He said he'd started drinking as a teenager and turned to drugs when he was 20. Outten admitted that he'd always been a kleptomaniac. He talked about learning carpentry as a trade in ninth grade and quitting school after his junior year in high school. He said he'd continued his education while incarcerated and had a regular roofing job. Outten said he'd started his own roofing company to work on weekends, but admitted that he stole to buy the tools for his company. He never acknowledged Mannon's murder, instead maintaining his innocence.

Outten talked about the relationship he had with his girlfriend, how they met, and the circumstances of his first child's death. Outten talked about his second child with Julian, and said it hurt that he couldn't hold him and spend time with him, and said he wanted to see them grow. Outten ended by saying "I am hoping to persuade the people involved that I am not a monster. I have feelings. . . . I want to let the court know that I wasn't uncontrollable, even though my rap sheet indicates otherwise. . . . To society and the judicial system, I look like a villain, but this is not me. I am full of caring, sharing, honesty, and love. What I am not is a cold, calculated, ruthless and heartless person. My good qualities — my good qualities outweigh the negative ones favorably. . . . Give me the benefit of the doubt, because this could mean the end of the road for me. I have faith that you jurors are capable of distinguishing right from wrong."

Steven's lawyer reminded the jury that his client grew up in an abusive home. "He was taught violence," he said. "He learned violence as a means of survival." He asked the jury to "rise above the state's call for death and to "show your loved ones to respect life."

After their allocution statements, the prosecution denounced the trio for their lack of remorse:

"And they told you or paid lip service that they had concerns for the families of the victim, what did you hear about their remorse for their acts? What did you hear about the concern for the families of the victim whose life was taken innocently, without any wrong that he caused any of these individuals?"

On March 5, 1993, the jury recommended death sentences for all three men. The votes for Nelson and Steven were both 8–4 in favor of death. The vote for Jack was 7–5 in favor of death. They were formally sentenced to death on April 30, 1993. Judge Jerome Herlihy said the men showed "an indescribable lust to kill."

== Kidney donation by Steven Shelton and Nelson's execution ==
In 1994, Nelson, who said he was planning to waive appeals, drew national attention after offering to donate one of his kidneys to his ailing mother, Vessa. Vessa, who'd received a kidney transplant nearly a decade earlier, had been told it was failing and she needed a new kidney.

When Nelson heard of his mother's medical troubles, he immediately offered to give her one of his kidneys. "She's had a rough life," he said. "She did the best she could, and now, she needs a kidney. Even if I wasn't in this situation, I'd give her one of mine."

Nelson's request was later turned down after his kidney was found to be incompatible, but in 1995, Vessa received a kidney transplant from Steven, who offered his own kidney in his brother's place. Vessa asked for a postponement of the operation so she could spend her last day with Nelson, who had now waived all of his appeals and was soon scheduled to die.

Nelson was executed on March 17, 1995. He admitted responsibility for the murder, saying he'd found God on death row and said his decision to waive his appeals was partly out of frustration with prison conditions, and partly out of remorse. Nelson said he couldn't live with what he'd done and described prison conditions as "Day in and day out mental frustration. Pure stagnation. Hell without the flames." Nelson's last meal consisted mushroom-and-pepperoni pizza and a Pepsi. Before his death, Nelson was visited by his mother, his family, and clergy. He was also granted a 20-minute visit with Steven. When asked if he had any last words, Nelson said "No." However, he did leave a written statement:

To my fellow mankind,

I have sinned against God and you. I am very sorry for my sins. I have begged God for his forgiveness, and God has shown me his forgiveness and mercy and his salvation in his only begotten son Jesus Christ who died for all the worlds sins. We all must die, but after death comes judgement for what we have done in our lives. We all are sinners, we all have sinned in one way or another, some are great sinners like me and some are little sinners. We all need to be saved and Jesus is the only way. Jesus is my Lord and Savior. I have repented of my sins to God, and to you my fellow mankind. I really wish I would have read Gods holy word, the holy Bible, before all this. But now I know Gods will Gods ways, and Gods morals, and how and why God wants us to live. I am very grateful and thankful that I had the chance to repent unto God for my sins, before I die. Just as there is a heaven there is a hell, and the holy Bible tells us all about it. I have prayed for the people I have hurt for God to heal them of the wrong that was done. I have died because of my sins, but I die not in my sins. Thanks to my Lord Jesus. From the blood of my heart I am very sorry for the way I have lived my life. Please forgive me.

Nelson W. Shelton

As the execution proceeded, a single tear rolled down Nelson's cheek. He was pronounced dead at 12:34 a.m.

== Appeals, plea agreements, and reduced sentences ==
Over the years, Steven and Outten filed numerous appeals. In 2006, Outten's sentence was overturned after a federal appellate court ruled that his lawyer had not done a good enough job in defending him and presenting mitigation. In 2008, his conviction was also overturned after the Delaware Supreme Court ruled that there was not enough evidence to prove that he had murdered Mannon "in furtherance of robbery". Because this automatically removed one of the statutory aggravating factors against Outten, the court found that this placed his entire conviction and sentence in jeopardy. Steven's conviction and sentence was soon overturned as well.

In 2011, Steven and Outten pleaded guilty to second degree murder. Their plea agreements allowed them to only admit their guilt as accomplices and called for a sentences of no less than 12 years in prison and no more than 42 years in prison.

During their sentencing hearings, Steven and Outten, who were now in their 40s, apologized and told Judge Jerome Herlihy, who had presided over their original trials and sentenced them to die, that they were changed men, humbled by the nearly two decades they'd spent in prison. They said they'd greatly matured from the angry, arrogant self-centered young men they were described as during their trials. Outten said the 12 1/2 years he'd spent in solitary confinement while on death row forced him "to reflect on his life and all the people he has let down along the way."

Mannon's family decried the plea agreements, which the prosecution said had been offered due to questions about the reliability of Gibbons's testimony.

Mannon's wife, Mary Lou Hutchins, said Outten and Steven would face higher justice. "They will burn in hell and I'll be on the other side of the pearly gates waiting on them," she said. One of Mannon's sons, Steven Mannon, said "I waited 19 years to get a phone call," referring to a date and time when Shelton and Outten would be executed. He relented that he was instead waiting to hear the new sentence that would one day set his father's killers free.

The prosecution pushed for the judge to impose the maximum sentences allowed under the plea agreements, while the defense asked for leniency. Steven's attorney pointed to him donating a kidney to his mother as a redeeming quality.

Herlihy ultimately resentenced Steven to 39 years in prison and Outten to 38 years in prison. Steven's sentence was set to run consecutive to a separate one-year sentence for violating his probation, giving him a total of 40 years to serve. Due to being convicted of additional crimes in prison, Steven faces even more time in prison and has forfeited most of his good time credits. Herlihy decried the fact that Steven and Outten were still not accepting full responsibility for their role in the murder, saying they were now pointing fingers at Nelson, the only person who could no longer speak himself since he was the only was one to "man up" to what he had done.

After the hearing, Steven Mannon said that Steven Shelton and Outten "got off easy." He said neither he nor his mother believed that the two were genuinely remorseful. "Absolutely not," he said. Hutchins described the family's life as hard without Wilson. "He was a good man and a good father," Hutchins said.

Steven Mannon said there was nothing the pair could do to prove they were genuinely remorseful. "The only thing I want them to do is die in jail," he said.

Steven Shelton and Outten are currently serving their sentences at James T. Vaughn Correctional Center, the same prison where Nelson was executed. Steven is scheduled for release in July 2035, and Outten is scheduled for release in March 2026.

== See also ==
- Capital punishment in Delaware
- List of people executed in Delaware
- List of people executed in the United States in 1995
