= List of people executed in Delaware (pre-1972) =

The following is a list of people executed by the U.S. state of Delaware before 1972, when capital punishment was briefly abolished by the Supreme Court's ruling in Furman v. Georgia. For executions after the restoration of capital punishment by the Supreme Court's ruling in Gregg v. Georgia (1976), see List of people executed in Delaware.

== List of executions ==
Historically, executions in Delaware were carried out locally by hanging in county prisons known as "workhouses". The state used a portable gallows kept at New Castle and transported to Kent and Sussex Counties as needed during the 20th century, although "serious offenders" could be sent to New Castle for execution at the discretion of the other two counties' courts. Delaware briefly abolished capital punishment from 1958 to 1961.

Slave executions

Name	Race	Age	Sex	Date of execution	County	Crime	Victim(s)	Governor
French	Middle Eastern		M	October 19, 1662	Sussex	Malicious wounding	Three people, white	N/A
Judith Roe	White		F	March 15, 1688	Kent	Murder-Robbery	Male, white	William Penn
Eleanor Moore	White		F	May 9, 1722	New Castle	Murder	Unknown, white (newborn child)	John Penn
Catherine Bevan	White	50	F	June 10, 1731 (Note: Peter was hanged, while Catherine was sentenced to be strangled and burned at the stake. However, the rope burnt through before she strangled, resulting in her being burned alive.)	New Castle	Petty treason-Murder	Henry Bevan, 60, white (Bevan's husband)	Patrick Gordon
Peter Murphy	White		M	June 10, 1731	New Castle	Petty treason-Murder	Henry Bevan, 60, white (Bevan's husband)	Patrick Gordon
Terrence White	White		M	May 1747	New Castle	Burglary		George Thomas
Thomas White	White		M	November 1748	New Castle	Bestiality	A mare	James Hamilton
John Gillespie	White		M	June 1749	New Castle	Burglary		James Hamilton
John Roach	White		M	June 1749	New Castle	Burglary		James Hamilton
John Slain	White		M	June 1749	New Castle	Rape		James Hamilton
Phil	Black		M	September 1750	Kent	Burglary		James Hamilton
Margaret Sexton	White		F	June 17, 1751	New Castle	Murder	Male, 4, white (stepson)	James Hamilton
Alice Cunningham	White		F	February 8, 1752	Kent	Murder	Eleanor Gulliver, white	James Hamilton
Archibald Cunningham	White		M	February 8, 1752	Kent	Murder	Eleanor Gulliver, white	James Hamilton
James Duffy	White		M	August 21, 1754	Kent	Murder	John Brown, white	Robert Hunter Morris
David Brown	White		M	June 7, 1757	New Castle	Burglary		William Denny
Thomas Coughlin	White		M	June 7, 1757	New Castle	Burglary		William Denny
Eleanor Evans	White		F	May 11, 1761	Kent	Murder	Female, white (illegitimate child)	James Hamilton
Hugh Barclay	White		M	June 9, 1770	New Castle	Burglary	Richard McWilliam, white	John Penn
Charles	Black		M	November 20, 1770	Kent	Rape	Mary Crippen, white	John Penn
George	Black		M	October 6, 1773	Kent	Murder	Margaret Scantlin, white	Richard Penn
Cheney Clow	White	49	M	September 15, 1783	Kent	Murder	Moore, white (posse member)	Nicholas Van Dyke
John Green	White		M	May 1784	New Castle	Murder		Nicholas Van Dyke
Benn	Black		M	October 25, 1786	Kent	Rape	Hannah Jackson, white	Nicholas Van Dyke
Sarah Kirk	White		F	December 12, 1787	New Castle	Petty treason-Murder	James Kirk, white (husband)	Thomas Collins
Ben	Black		M	September 14, 1792	New Castle	Rape	Female, white	Joshua Clayton
John Morris	Black		M	December 18, 1792	Kent	Rape	Female, white	Joshua Clayton
Elihu Prettyman	White		M	April 8, 1806	Sussex	Murder	Priscilla Prettyman, white (wife)	Nathaniel Mitchell
George Parker	White		M	April 21, 1807	Kent	Rape	Hannah Bramble, white	Nathaniel Mitchell
Henry Bereton	White		M	April 13, 1813	Sussex	Murder-Robbery	John Ridgell, white	Joseph Haslet
John Griffith	White		M	April 13, 1813	Sussex	Murder-Robbery	John Ridgell, white	Joseph Haslet
John Smith	White		M	December 21, 1815	New Castle	Murder		Daniel Rodney
William Piper	White		M	April 18, 1820	Sussex	Murder	Female, white (mother)	John Collins
Henry Barrett	Black		M	February 5, 1822	Kent	Murder	Henry Douglass, white	John Collins
Jacob Elliott	Black		M	December 31, 1822	New Castle	Murder	John Kean, white	Caleb Rodney
Elisha Sharp	White		M	November 8, 1825	Sussex	Murder	Two people, white (wife and child)	Samuel Paynter
Robert Morris	White		M	November 8, 1831	Sussex	Murder	Charles Hilborn, white	David Hazzard
Thomas Morgan	Black		M	June 17, 1839	New Castle	Murder	Male, black (brother-in-law)	Cornelius P. Comegys
Perry Bailey	Black		M	February 7, 1849	New Castle	Rape	Mary Ann Sythens, white	William Tharp
James Anderson	Black		M	July 31, 1851	New Castle	Murder	Joseph Williams, 70, white	William H. H. Ross
Empson Bayard	Black		M	July 31, 1851	New Castle	Murder	Joseph Williams, 70, white	William H. H. Ross
Samuel Ward	Black	22	M	September 8, 1852	New Castle	Murder	George A. Davidson, 25, white	William H. H. Ross
John Bowen	White		M	February 10, 1860	New Castle	Murder	John W. Dewlin, white	William Burton
John Cannon	Black	18	M	December 14, 1860	Sussex	Murder-Rape	Ms. Griffin, 14, white	Gove Saulsbury
Sarah Bradley	Black	18	F	December 14, 1860	Sussex	Murder	Ellen Wright, 14 months, white	Gove Saulsbury
Levi Jenkins	Black	35	M	December 14, 1860	Sussex	Rape	Hester A. Johnson, black	Gove Saulsbury
John Cannon	Black		M	December 28, 1860	Kent	Rape	Mary Ann Martin, white	Gove Saulsbury
Thomas Orskins	White		M	February 14, 1863	Kent	Murder	John Bennett, white	Gove Saulsbury
William Manluff	Black (Note: "Yellow negro" (possibly mixed).)	25	M	July 20, 1866	New Castle	Aggravated burglary (Note: Also attempted to rape Elizabeth Griffith and slashed her head and neck with a razor.)	Hannah Febiger Jones and Elizabeth Griffith, 71 and 20, white	Gove Saulsbury
Andrew Armstrong	White	53	M	February 8, 1867	New Castle	Murder	Caroline Douglass Armstrong, 36, white (wife) (Note: Also admitted to "various bloody deeds" he committed while working as a chain bearer for a coastal survey in California.)	Gove Saulsbury
Joshua Jones	Black	17	M	February 4, 1870	New Castle	Rape-Burglary	Mary Meredith, 43, white	Gove Saulsbury
Louis Carpenter	Black	21	M	February 4, 1870	New Castle	Rape-Burglary	Mary Meredith, 43, white	Gove Saulsbury
Edward Young	Black	19	M	June 24, 1870	Kent	Murder-Robbery	Thomas Hogan, 50, white	Gove Saulsbury
Benjamin Johnson	Black	33	M	December 16, 1870	Sussex	Rape	Charlotte Fletcher, 28, white (Note: Serial rapist.)	Gove Saulsbury
Andrew Clark	Black	41	M	July 12, 1872	New Castle	Rape	Martha Rakes, 14, black (Note: Serial rapist, also attacked Mrs. Reynolds (white), Ms. Jane Marvin (16, white), Ms. Mather (white), and Mrs. Dara (white).)	James Ponder
William Dennis	Mixed (Note: Mulatto.)	20	M	January 24, 1873	New Castle	Rape	Mary Thompson, 26, white	James Ponder
Joseph Burton	Black	23	M	June 20, 1873	Sussex	Rape	Hannah Lank, 14, white	James Ponder
John Rhodes	Black	24	M	September 21, 1877	New Castle	Murder	James Temple, black	John P. Cochran
Samuel Chambers	Black	35	M	March 22, 1878	New Castle	Rape	Mary Catherine Smith, 32, white	John P. Cochran
George Collins	Black	19	M	March 22, 1878	New Castle	Rape	Mary Catherine Smith, 32, white	John P. Cochran
James Redden	Black	21	M	August 25, 1882	New Castle	Rape	Sallie Jane Purse, 14, white	John W. Hall
Charles Robinson	Black	33	M	April 16, 1886	New Castle	Rape	Ella F. Gardner, 21, white	Charles C. Stockley
Charles Reidel	White	36	M	August 10, 1888	New Castle	Murder	Lena and Wilhelm Reidel, 37 and 7, white (wife and son)	Benjamin T. Biggs
Jesse Proctor	Black	34	M	February 13, 1891	Kent	Murder-Robbery	Stephen Lindsay, 82, black	Robert J. Reynolds
Fredrick Young	Black	17	M	February 13, 1891	Kent	Murder-Robbery	Stephen Lindsay, 82, black	Robert J. Reynolds
Shakespeare Reeves	Black	33	M	March 6, 1891	New Castle	Rape	Grace Clark, 11, white	Robert J. Reynolds
James Thoroughgood	Black	22	M	August 7, 1891	Kent	Rape	Louisa Gertrude Huffington, 8, black	Robert J. Reynolds
Edward Wright	Black	29	M	January 1, 1897	New Castle	Murder	Ida Crummel, 23, black (ex-girlfriend)	Ebe W. Tunnell
Thomas Willis	Black	23	M	February 19, 1897	New Castle	Murder	Callie Willis, 1, black (daughter)	Ebe W. Tunnell
James Gordy	White	29	M	June 11, 1897	Sussex	Murder	Mary Estelle Lewis Gordy, 33, white (wife) (Note: Also suspected of murdering his father Peter B. Gordy, his first wife, and their infant child.)	Ebe W. Tunnell
John Joiner	Black	25	M	September 2, 1904	New Castle	Murder	John R. Taylor, 23, black	John Hunn
William Archer	Black	21	M	January 11, 1907	New Castle	Murder	Ida Elizabeth Spires, 28, black (girlfriend)	Preston Lea
Lewis Jones	Black	30	M	January 25, 1907	New Castle	Murder	Arameda Jones, 24, black	Preston Lea
Reese Roberts	Black	30	M	July 14, 1911	New Castle	Murder-Burglary	Robert and Ann Cloud Casey, 70 and 68, white	Simeon S. Pennewill
Peter Krakus	White	25	M	May 14, 1915	New Castle	Murder	Francis X. Tierney, 31, white (police officer) (Note: Fugitive from Connecticut for the murders of Rev. Joseph Zebris and Iva Gilmanaitis (54 and 36, white); his accomplice, Bernard Montvid, was hanged there for the crime in August 1915.)	Charles R. Miller
William Prettyman	Black	29	M	September 28, 1917	Sussex (Note: Executed in New Castle County.)	Murder	Zadoc B. Parker, 38, black	John G. Townsend Jr.
Adam Hargus	Black	34	M	September 28, 1917	Sussex	Murder	Zadoc B. Parker, 38, black	John G. Townsend Jr.
Webster Purnell	Black	36	M	September 28, 1917	Sussex	Murder	Zadoc B. Parker, 38, black	John G. Townsend Jr.
Samuel Gangus	White	24	M	January 11, 1918	New Castle	Murder	Catherine Bodjeska, 20, white	John G. Townsend Jr.
Ernest Thomas	Black	21	M	November 26, 1920	New Castle	Rape	Emma Talley, 58, white	John G. Townsend Jr.
Lemuel Price	Black	24	M	December 3, 1920	New Castle	Murder	Thomas L. Zebley, 41, white (police officer)	John G. Townsend Jr.
Harry Butler	Black	21	M	February 26, 1926	Sussex	Rape	Eleanor Steinmetz, 10, white (Note: Also attacked a black woman, Bertha Neal.)	Robert P. Robinson
Carl Skinner	Black	27	M	May 27, 1927	Sussex	Rape-Burglary	Julia A. Bennett, 85, white	Robert P. Robinson
Louis Galvano	White	21	M	March 28, 1930	New Castle	Murder	Arthur C. Cline, 24, white	C. Douglass Buck
Theodore Russ	Black	24	M	August 22, 1930	Kent	Rape-Burglary	Mary Kemp Read, 21, white	C. Douglass Buck
John C. Morgan	White	44	M	April 12, 1935	Kent	Murder	Dominique J. Pierre, 61, white (Note: Also murdered Frank Foster (57, white).)	C. Douglass Buck
May H. Carey	White	52	F	June 7, 1935	Sussex	Murder	Robert R. Hitchens, 55, white (May's brother)	C. Douglass Buck
Howard Carey	White	28	M	June 7, 1935	Sussex	Murder	Robert R. Hitchens, 55, white (May's brother)	C. Douglass Buck
George Scott	Black	26	M	November 20, 1936	New Castle	Murder	Elbert Paul, 23, black	C. Douglass Buck
Isaiah Opher	Black	36	M	January 3, 1937	New Castle	Murder-Attempted rape	Isabelle Robinson, 13, black	C. Douglass Buck
Joseph Nelson	Black	36	M	June 4, 1937	Sussex	Murder	Carrie Lethal, 51, black (common-law wife)	Richard McMullen
Curnel Robinson	Black	34	M	January 14, 1941	New Castle	Rape	Female, 15, white (Note: Serial rapist, also pleaded guilty to raping three white women and previously attacked numerous black girls.)	Richard McMullen
Ralph W. Ernest	White	33	M	January 9, 1942	New Castle	Rape	Female, 6, white	Walter W. Bacon
Anderson D. J. Butler	Black	23	M	December 7, 1945	New Castle	Rape	Female, 12, white	Walter W. Bacon
Forrest Sturdivant	Black	34	M	May 10, 1946	Sussex	Murder	George Leslie Polk, 65, black	Walter W. Bacon

== See also ==
- Capital punishment in Delaware
- Capital punishment in the United States
