= Kenneth Granviel =

American serial killer (1950–1996)

- Mugshot
- Born: August 4, 1950; Fort Worth, Texas, U.S.
- Died: February 27, 1996 (aged 45); Huntsville Unit, Texas, U.S.
- Status: Executed by lethal injection
- Conviction: Capital murder (1 count) (Note: for the death of Natasha McClendon)
- Penalty: Death

Details
- Victims: 7–9
- Span of crimes: 1974–1975
- Country: United States
- State: Texas
- Date apprehended: February 8, 1975

Kenneth Granviel (August 4, 1950 – February 27, 1996) was an American serial killer who was responsible for the sexually motivated murders of seven people in Fort Worth, Texas from 1974 to 1975, most notably the mass murder of three women and two children. After willingly admitting to the crimes, and after several delays and challenges to his sentence, he was convicted, sentenced to death and executed in 1996.

== Early life ==
Kenneth Granviel was born on August 4, 1950, in Fort Worth. He, along with his older brother and half-brother were raised solely by his mother in a small house on Charlotte Street. From an early age, Granviel was considered an odd, reclusive child who was often by himself, had few friends and almost never interacted with girls.

On March 22, 1967, Granviel entered his mother's bedroom, where he grabbed her by the throat and attempted to rape her. During their scuffle, he managed to come back to his senses, before Granviel stumbled to the front porch and collapsed onto the yard. Soon after the incident, his mother called the police who took the 16-year-old into custody. Due to his odd behavior, he was temporarily interned at the John Peter Smith Hospital, where he remained for ten days. After being temporarily released, Granviel sexually assaulted his brother. As a result, he was sent to the Gatesville State School, where he spent the next two and a half years.

== Murders ==
After his release, Granviel found a job at a letter manufacturing company, where he was described as a reliable and kind employee. His neighbors considered him friendly towards children and active in church activities, and was overall well-regarded by his friends and acquaintances. At one point, he was drafted to serve as a machine gunner in Vietnam, but was dishonorably discharged after being accused of beating up fellow soldiers. At the time, he was dating Everlene Gould, the oldest of three sisters belonging to the McClendon family, who would later claim that he was occasionally violent towards her in arguments.

=== Riverside Village ===
On October 8, 1974, Granviel was driving around the Riverside Village apartment complex when he got the sudden urge to have sex with one of the McClendon sisters, 21-year-old Laura. He drove to the apartment, knocked on the front door and was let in to have a glass of water. At the time, the apartment was occupied by Laura, her 19-year-old sister Linda, 24-year-old cousin Martha, and two children, Steven and Natasha, both 2-year-olds. He went to the kitchen, where Laura and Steven were, grabbed a steak knife and ordered the pair into the bedroom, where he told Laura to tie up her son with a telephone cord. After the other family members came in to investigate, they were all tied up and gagged.

He then led Laura to another room, where he began to rape her. At that time, Natasha started crying, prompting Granviel to start stabbing her, before tossing her onto the floor and stabbing her some more. Next came Linda, whom he strangled to death with a piece of cloth before moving onto Steven, who was shoved into a closet and stabbed repeatedly; the knife's handle eventually broke from the force. Granviel acquired another knife from the kitchen and continued to rape Laura before fatally stabbing her to death. After this, he and the only surviving family member, Martha, talked for some time in the same room where he had just killed her cousin. He then proceeded to stab her to death as well. Granviel then emptied out his victims' purses of all the money and valuables he could find and left the apartment. The victims were all later found when the family's stepfather arrived to take the two women to their job at a furniture store.

Despite his personal connections with the family, Granviel was never considered a suspect, and two Mexican nationals were arrested for the brutal crime instead. According to later testimonies from friends and co-workers, he occasionally discussed the murders, saying that the man who did it "ought to be hung."

=== South Side ===
On February 8, 1975, feeling the urge to kill again, Granviel lured a friend of his, 24-year-old Betty Williams, into his apartment on the pretence of giving her a package of cigarettes. While she was browsing through the drawers in his bedroom, Granviel crept up behind her and turned her upside down, temporarily dizzying her. He then took off her clothes and began raping her, but he was interrupted by his friend, 21-year-old Vera Hill, who had come to ask him about some income tax. Before she could enter the apartment, Granviel managed to get to the kitchen and grab a knife, then lunged at her, stabbing the woman in the chest. He then continued to stab her in the chest, stomach and back until she fell to the ground, before going back to the bedroom, where he continued his assault on Williams, whom he also beat and stabbed.

While she was still breathing, Granviel left the apartment and drove around town, before deciding to stop at a friend's house, where he asked to be let in to use the phone. Once he was let inside, he raped his friend's mother and kept the other family members under watch, before finally kidnapping one of the daughters and fleeing back to his apartment. There, he raped her, but suddenly ceased when he heard a commotion coming from the bedroom. When he checked in, he found that Williams was still alive and attempting to stop the bleeding of her wounds, only for Granviel to tell her to stop it, which she did, succumbing to her injuries.

== Surrender, arrest and investigation ==
Out of an apparent feeling of guilt, Granviel forced his rape victim into the car, where they drove to the local Pilgrim's Galilee Baptist Church and picked up the presiding pastor, Rev. Roy Lee Spearman. On the way to the police station, Granviel said that he "wanted to be taken out of society" and he did not want to harm any more innocent people. Once they arrived at the station, Granviel and Spearman asked for a homicide detective, to which Detective F. D. Raulston responded and brought Granviel to an office.

In there, Granviel took out a pistol and a butcher knife, placed them on the table and asked for Lt. Oliver Ball, the lead detective investigating the Riverside Village murders. Ball, along with district attorney Rufus Adcock, were called into the office, and in front of all three of them, Granviel readily confessed to all seven murders.

Following his confession, Granviel was immediately detained. On the next day, he led officers to his apartment, where they discovered Williams and Hill's bodies. As a result, he was subsequently charged with seven counts of capital murder and one count of aggravated rape, which made him eligible for the death penalty.

As part of a routine investigation, Granviel was investigated as a potential suspect in other killings committed in the Texas area, including the then-unsolved murder of Carla Walker. While he was ruled out in several, he was considered a credible suspect in two: the 1967 murder of 37-year-old Mildred May, whose nude and battered body was found along the I-35W near Fort Worth, since he had already been questioned in the death at the time. The other was the 1974 murder of 18-year-old Cheryl Callaway, who was stabbed 47 times with an ice pick at a parking lot in Arlington. However, he was never charged in either murder, both of which remain unsolved.

== Trial and sentence ==
In Granviel's subsequent trial, numerous witnesses came forward to testify regarding his odd behavior before and after the murders, including Gould, who was the first witness brought forward. Just days after the trial, Justice Tom Cave allowed the prosecutors to admit Granviel's four-page long confession as evidence, over the objections of his attorneys.

During the proceedings, conflicting testimony was given regarding Granviel's sanity, as psychiatrists on the defense claimed that he was a paranoid schizophrenic driven by uncontrollable sexual impulses, while the prosecuting side claimed that he was well aware of what did. Granviel himself, who had pleaded not guilty by reason of insanity, said before the jury that while he acknowledged he was solely responsible for the killings, he was unable to control himself in the moment. In the end, he was unanimously convicted by jury verdict, who recommended that he be given the death penalty.

His sentence was automatically appealed, but subsequently upheld by the Texas Court of Criminal Appeals the following year. With his initial execution date set for September 14, 1977, Granviel was scheduled to be the first inmate to be executed under Texas' new lethal injection protocol. This motion was challenged by his attorneys, who argued that this was unconstitutional, as they considered it "even more cruel" than the previous method of electrocution. Eventually, they succeeded in granting him a stay of execution, allowing him to remain on death row for more than 20 years.

== Execution ==
After several delays and stays of executions, Granviel was executed via lethal injection at the Huntsville Unit on February 27, 1996. He declined to make a final statement.

== See also ==
- 1995 Okinawa rape incident
- Capital punishment in Texas
- List of people executed by lethal injection
- List of people executed in Texas, 1990–1999
- List of people executed in the United States in 1996
- List of serial killers in the United States
