= Dawson v. Delaware =

- Supreme Court of the United States

Argued November 12, 1991 Decided March 9, 1992
- Full case name: Dawson v. Delaware, Certiorari to the Supreme Court of Delaware
- Citations: 503 U.S. 159 (more) 112 S. Ct. 1093; 117 L. Ed. 2d 309

Case history
- Prior: Dawson v. State, 581 A.2d 1078 (Del. 1990)

Holding
- The petitioner's First Amendment and Fourteenth Amendment rights were violated by the admission of evidence at sentencing that had no relevance to the case.

Court membership
- Chief Justice William Rehnquist Associate Justices Byron White · Harry Blackmun; John P. Stevens · Sandra Day O'Connor; Antonin Scalia · Anthony Kennedy; David Souter · Clarence Thomas

Case opinions
- Majority: Rehnquist, joined by White, Blackmun, Stevens, O'Connor, Scalia, Kennedy, Souter
- Concurrence: Blackmun
- Dissent: Thomas

Laws applied
- U.S. Const. amends. I, XIV

Dawson v. Delaware, 503 U.S. 159 (1992), was a United States Supreme Court decision that ruled that a person's rights of association and due process, as granted under the First Amendment and Fourteenth Amendment of the United States Constitution, cannot be infringed upon if such an association has no bearing on the case at hand.

== Background ==
Early in the morning of December 1, 1986, David Dawson and three other inmates escaped from the Delaware Correctional Center at Smyrna. Dawson stole a car and headed south, while the other escapees stole another car and headed north. After burglarizing one home in Kenton, Dawson entered the home of Richard and Madeline Kisner. Dawson tied up Mrs. Kisner, who was at home alone preparing for work, and stabbed her 12 times before taking her car and some money. He was found the next day sleeping in a different stolen car in Milford.

The Delaware Superior Court found Dawson guilty of first-degree murder and several other crimes on June 24, 1988. During the penalty phase, the prosecution planned to present evidence that Dawson belonged to the prison's chapter of the Aryan Brotherhood, including expert testimony about that group, to prove that Dawson's membership was relevant to his crimes. Eventually, Dawson agreed to a stipulation that the Aryan Brotherhood was a white racist group that had its roots in a California prison gang of the same name, in return for the exclusion of expert testimony about the group. The jury concluded that the aggravating factors in the case, including Dawson's prison record, his escape from prison, the fact that he committed the murder adjunct to a second felony, and his association with the Aryan Brotherhood outweighed the mitigating factors and sentenced him to death. The Supreme Court of Delaware upheld the death sentence.

== Opinion of the Court ==
In writing the Court's opinion, Chief Justice Rehnquist noted that the Constitution does not erect a per se barrier to the admission of evidence of a person's beliefs and associations during sentencing simply because those beliefs and associations are protected by the First Amendment. Chief Justice Rehnquist cited Barclay v. Florida, 463 U.S. 939 (1983), for which he had written the Court's opinion as an Associate Justice, as a case where such beliefs were material in establishing the murderers' motives. In Barclay, Elwood Barclay and four other black men, looking to start a race war, killed white hitchhiker Stephen Orlando in Jacksonville Beach, Florida, in 1974. The Supreme Court of Florida imposed the death penalty on Barclay and co-defendant Jacob John Dougan. In 1985, however, the court reversed itself by ordering that Barclay's sentence be commuted to life in prison with eligibility for parole in 25 years and that Dougan be re-sentenced. Dougan was sentenced to death again in 1987 and remains on Florida's Death Row.

Chief Justice Rehnquist noted that because of the narrowness of the stipulation regarding the Aryan Brotherhood that the Delaware trial court agreed to – that is, because the trial court did not seek to provide evidence that the chapter Dawson was associated with was engaged in or endorsed racist activities, or was engaged in or endorsed any other violent or unlawful acts – it violated Dawson's rights under both the First and Fourteenth Amendments. Chief Justice Rehnquist also noted that even if the Aryan Brotherhood chapter did hold racist beliefs, elements of racial hatred were absent in this case. Both Dawson and Kisner, the woman he murdered, were white. The Court vacated the sentence against Dawson and remanded the case.

=== Concurrence ===
In his concurrence, Justice Blackmun agreed with the Court's opinion, but specifically noted that the Court did not require harmless error review on remand. In the next-to-last paragraph of the Court's opinion, Chief Justice Rehnquist noted that the question of harmless error was not before the Court with regard to the admission of the Aryan Brotherhood stipulation. Justice Blackmun agreed with Rehnquist that the issue of harmless error was best left for Delaware to consider.

=== Dissent ===
In his dissent, Justice Thomas declared that he believed the Aryan Brotherhood stipulation spoke directly to Dawson's character, and as such the stipulation had relevance at sentencing as an aggravating factor. Justice Thomas noted that even if the prosecution did not introduce specific evidence of the Aryan Brotherhood chapter's activities, the jury could reasonably conclude that Dawson had engaged in some sort of illegal or forbidden activities during his membership in the gang. Justice Thomas cited a 1985 report from the U.S. Department of Justice about prison gangs to illustrate their deviant nature, and the U.S. Court of Appeals case Jones v. Hamelman (7th Cir. 1989) to illustrate that expert testimony was unnecessary to describe a prison gang once its existence was noted. Justice Thomas believed that the Court was imposing a double standard on the prosecution in this case and future cases by allowing Dawson to present mitigating character evidence during sentencing without explaining such evidence explicitly while not allowing the prosecution to do the same.

Chief Justice Rehnquist acknowledged Justice Thomas's points in the opinion. He wrote that while the state was certainly free to submit aggravating evidence, the stipulation in and of itself could not be viewed as "bad" character evidence in its own right. Chief Justice Rehnquist went further by noting:

The material adduced by the dissent as to the nature of prison gangs...would, if it had been presented to the jury, have made this a different case. But we do not have the same confidence as the dissent does that jurors would be familiar with the court decisions and studies upon which it relies.

== Aftermath ==
Upon re-sentencing, David Dawson was sentenced to death a second time on April 2, 1993. He was executed by lethal injection on April 26, 2001.

== See also ==
- First Amendment to the United States Constitution
- Fourteenth Amendment to the United States Constitution
- List of United States Supreme Court cases, volume 503
- List of people executed in Delaware
- List of people executed in the United States in 2001
