= Billy Glaze =

American serial killer

- Born: Billy Richard Glaze; July 13, 1943; Georgia, U.S.
- Died: December 22, 2015 (aged 72); James T. Vaughn Correctional Center, New Castle County, Delaware, U.S.
- Other names: Jesse Coulter; Jesse Sitting Crow; Butcher Knife Billy
- Conviction: First degree murder (3 counts)
- Penalty: Life imprisonment

Details
- Victims: 3–20+
- State: Minnesota
- Date apprehended: August 31, 1987

Billy Richard Glaze (July 13, 1943 – December 22, 2015), also known as "Jesse Sitting Crow", was a convicted American serial killer whose guilt has come into question by the discovery of DNA evidence excluding Glaze and implicating another man.

== Crimes ==
Glaze was suspected of the murders of at least 50 women in multiple states.

He allegedly boasted to police about having killed over 20 women, but in interviews claimed he was innocent.

Glaze became a suspect in the 1985-87 murders of three Native American women in the Minneapolis, Minnesota area after a waitress brought him to the attention of authorities. Information from a girlfriend led investigators to look for him in New Mexico. Glaze was arrested on August 31, 1987, while driving under the influence of alcohol, for a violation of his parole from a Texas conviction for rape in 1974. The arresting officers found a bloody shirt, crowbar and nightstick in his truck.

Hair samples from the crowbar were used to convict him of murder. He was convicted of three counts of first degree murder and sentenced to life in prison with a 52.5-year minimum. At sentencing he maintained his innocence. Glaze was housed in James T. Vaughn Correctional Center in Smyrna, Delaware.

== New evidence ==
DNA testing conducted by the Innocence Project in 2009 found that semen from one victim's rape kit didn't match Glaze, but instead matched another Minnesota man, a convicted rapist. Additional testing done in 2014 on a cigarette butt found near the body of a second victim came back as a match to the same man. In spite of testing dozens of pieces of evidence from the three crime scenes, none came back as a match to Glaze.

Glaze's attorneys filed a motion for a new trial both based on the DNA testing results and questions about the reliability of eyewitnesses who testified at Glaze's original trial, one of whom has since recanted and another who has claimed to have witnessed more than 60 murders during his time in prison. In response to the filing by Glaze's attorneys, the Minneapolis Police Department and the Hennepin County Attorney's Office are re-investigating the case.

== Death ==
Glaze died on December 22, 2015, aged 72, shortly after being diagnosed with stage four lung cancer. He died in prison after spending more than 25 years incarcerated.

== See also ==
- List of serial killers in the United States
- List of serial killers by number of victims
