= Ake v. Oklahoma =

- Supreme Court of the United States

Argued November 7, 1984 Decided February 26, 1985
- Full case name: Glen Burton Ake v. Oklahoma
- Citations: 470 U.S. 68 (more) 105 S. Ct. 1087; 84 L. Ed. 2d 53; 1985 U.S. LEXIS 52; 53 U.S.L.W. 4179

Case history
- Prior: On appeal from the Court of Criminal Appeals of Oklahoma

Holding
- Where the sanity of an indigent criminal defendant is likely to be a significant factor at trial, the Fourteenth Amendment's Due Process Clause requires the state to provide him with access to a psychiatrist to assist in his defense at no cost to himself.

Court membership
- Chief Justice Warren E. Burger Associate Justices William J. Brennan Jr. · Byron White; Thurgood Marshall · Harry Blackmun; Lewis F. Powell Jr. · William Rehnquist; John P. Stevens · Sandra Day O'Connor

Case opinions
- Majority: Marshall, joined by Brennan, White, Blackmun, Powell, Stevens, O'Connor
- Concurrence: Burger
- Dissent: Rehnquist

Laws applied
- U.S. Const. amend. XIV

Ake v. Oklahoma, 470 U.S. 68 (1985), was a case in which the Supreme Court of the United States held that the Due Process Clause of the Fourteenth Amendment required the state to provide a psychiatric evaluation to be used on behalf of an indigent criminal defendant if he needed it.

== Background ==
Glen Burton Ake was arrested and charged with murdering a couple and wounding their two children in 1979. At his arraignment, his bizarre behavior prompted the judge to order a psychiatric competency evaluation. This resulted in a report by the examining psychiatrist that Ake was delusional, and specifically that Ake "claims to be the 'sword of vengeance' of the Lord and that he will sit at the left hand of God in heaven." Ake was diagnosed as a probable paranoid schizophrenic, and a prolonged psychiatric evaluation was recommended to determine whether Ake was competent to stand trial.

Ake was confined to a state hospital for several months before he was stabilized and determined to be fit to stand trial. The hospital had not evaluated Ake's mental state at the time the murders were committed and there was no expert testimony about this for either side, so Ake's attorney requested that the court appoint a psychiatrist to help prepare and present an adequate insanity defense. The court declined to provide the psychiatric evaluation at state expense. Ake was then tried and convicted of two counts of murder, and sentenced to death. The prosecutor argued for the death penalty, relying on the state psychiatrist's conclusion that Ake was "dangerous to society" to prove the aggravating factor of "future dangerousness".

Ake could not present evidence of any mitigating circumstances during the sentencing phase argument because he could not afford to hire an expert witness to rebut the prosecution's evidence. The Oklahoma Court of Criminal Appeals said "the unique nature of capital cases notwithstanding, the State does not have the responsibility of providing such services to indigents charged with capital crimes".

== Opinion of the Court ==
The Court, in an opinion by Justice Marshall, framed the question as one of "[m]eaningful access to justice", weighing the individual interest in the accuracy of a criminal proceeding against the burden imposed on the state, in light of "the probable value of the psychiatric assistance sought, and the risk of error in the proceeding if such assistance is not offered".

The Oklahoma court had denied the Ake's claim as waived under state law. The Supreme Court found the waiver decision did not rest on a true independent state ground that would block review. Under Oklahoma's own law, the waiver rule did not apply to "fundamental trial error." Oklahoma conceded that federal constitutional errors qualified as fundamental errors under state law. Therefore, the state's procedural ruling was not independent of federal law.

Because the state and federal issues were so intertwined, the Supreme Court concluded it has proper jurisdiction and proceeded to decide the constitutional merits of the case.

The Court found that both the individual and the state had a strong interest, but that "the State's interest in prevailing at trial - unlike that of a private litigant - is necessarily tempered by its interest in the fair and accurate adjudication of criminal cases." Requiring the state to make one psychiatrist available to indigent defendants was not an excessive financial burden, and the state could not assert the desire to press a strategic advantage at trial.

Chief Justice Burger wrote a brief concurring opinion, writing for himself that "Nothing in the Court's opinion reaches noncapital cases." Before the opinions were finalized, Burger had tried to persuade Marshall to limit his opinion to capital cases, but failed.

== Post-Opinion ==
After a retrial, Ake was convicted and received two life sentences. His accomplice, Steven Keith Hatch (October 9, 1953 – August 9, 1996) was executed in 1996 for the slayings even though he had waited in a car outside the family's home. According to People magazine, Hatch was inside the house. Leslie Brooks, who was 12 years old, testified that he raped her. Then Ake shot the family of four, the two children survived having watched their parents die. Ake died at a prison hospital in Oklahoma on April 23, 2011.
