= Valery Devyatyorov =

Soviet serial killer and rapist

- Born: Valery Prokopyevich Belosludtsev; 1944; Yakut ASSR, RSFSR
- Died: 8 September 1968 (aged 23–24); SIZO-1, Alma-Ata, Kazakh SSR
- Cause of death: Execution by shooting
- Other names: "The Alma-Ata Strangler" "The Alma-Ata Rapist" "The Almaty Chikatilo" "The Polite Maniac" "The Polite Rapist" "The Improvising Maniac" "The Invisible Maniac"
- Conviction: Murder x3
- Penalty: Death

Details
- Victims: 3+
- Span of crimes: 1967–1968
- Country: Soviet Union
- State: Alma-Ata
- Date apprehended: 10 April 1968

Valery Prokopyevich Devyatyorov, né Belosludtsev, (Russian: Валерий Прокопьевич Девятьяров-Белослудцев; 1944 – 8 September 1968), known as The Alma-Ata Strangler (Russian: Алма-Атинский душитель), was a Soviet serial killer and serial rapist who raped multiple women in Alma-Ata between 1967 and 1968, killing at least three. The killings received unprecedented attention by the Soviet high command, due to the fact that they occurred on the eve and during the 50th anniversary of the October Revolution, as well as Devyatyorov's unusual tactics to evade arrest.

Devyatyorov was eventually tried, convicted, and executed for his crimes. The case was classified for decades prior to the collapse of the USSR, and Devyatyorov has since become one of the most notorious murderers in the history of modern Kazakhstan.

== Early life ==
Valery Belosludtsev was born in 1944 in a gold mine the Yakut ASSR. His father Prokopy left the family early on, leaving Valery to be raised by his mother, a simple worker. Devyatyorov spent his early years in a relatively stable environment, but his childhood was marked by a traumatic experience that left him with a severe stutter. According to his mother, this supposedly occurred when her son, at age five, was frightened by a strange dog.

In the 1950s, as a teenager, Devyatyorov became seriously interested in various sports, and subsequently achieved outstanding results in this field. He was physically fit, and, according to eyewitness accounts, possessed extraordinary physical strength. After graduating from a vocational school as a welder, he was drafted into the Soviet Army, where he served with the Airborne Forces. During his time in the service, he exhibited no concerning behavior, and was even noted for mastering several combat techniques. Devyatyorov was most fond of one in particular, called "removing the sentry" (Russian: снятие часового) – this involved a soldier or group of soldiers approaching a designated "sentry" silently and without being noticed, then neutralizing him. Devyatyorov mastered this technique, which he would later on use on his victims.

=== First crime and move to Alma-Ata ===
After demobilization, Devyatyorov spent several years in his native Yakutia, where he did not study or work, and lead an anti-social lifestyle. In the mid-1960s, he became addicted to alcohol. Despite this, he continued playing sports and subsequently became a prize winner in multiple Spartakiad competitions involving combined sports, hockey, and swimming.

At around this time, Devyatyorov started having an increased sex drive, but despite the fact that he was an accomplished athlete, tall, and handsome, he was afraid of interacting of women due to his severe stutter, which often ended in him being ridiculed. This eventually led him to harbor a great resentment towards women in general.

In February 1967, Devyatyorov committed his first crime–he brought home a young girl and raped her. At that moment, his mother was in the next room and quickly realized what had happened, but as she was afraid of him being incarcerated, she instead sent him away to live with relatives in Alma-Ata on Udarny Street. There, Devyatyorov found a job as a welder with Kazstroymontazh, but continued drinking heavily in addition to developing a second addiction to smoking marijuana. He later claimed that these helped him relieve the stress from his failed relationships.

== Rapes and murders ==
=== Modus operandi ===
Between 1967 and 1968, Devyatyorov carried out dozens of rapes around various areas of Alma-Ata, all of which had an identical pattern. He would start stalking his victims from bus stops, mainly at night, and waited until they were alone on a deserted stretch of the street, where he would then attack them. Devyatyorov would sneak up on them using the technique he learned from the military, after which he would sexually assault them, regardless if they were minors or not. In some cases, he fatally strangled the victims with his bare hands or with whatever item he could find.

Devyatyorov never stole anything from the victims, and traveled across the city to carry out the attacks. A particularly unusual trait about the crimes was that despite the heinous act that he was committing, Devyatyorov would often act politely to them – after finishing the act, he would walk the victims home, and even talked to one woman's father, with the other man being aware that his daughter had just been raped. On some occasions, he even asked for their hands in marriage. This courtesy was not extended to victims who resisted his assaults, who were then immediately killed.

According to some sources, Devyatyorov's uncle worked in law enforcement, which enabled him to learn critical information about the investigation and avoid arrest. Devyatyorov later claimed that after finishing his work shift, he would drink alcohol and go around the city in an intoxicated state, looking for a victim.

=== Crimes ===
Devyatyorov's first recorded attack took place on 16 July 1967, following by at least five more rapes carried out through September of that year on the 11th, 19th, 22nd, 26th, and 29th. The day after the final rape for that month, Devyatyorov committed his first murder. The victim, Katya Vechkovskaya, was an eight-grade student at School No. 116, who had gone to see a play at the Sary-Arka Theater and was returning home with the bus. At around 11 PM, Vechkovskaya got off at the Vodokhranilishte stop (now Lake Sairan), and walked towards her home. According to her classmates, who remained at the bus stop to wait for another bus, she crossed Abay Avenue and walked along a concrete fence around a vacant lot toward her home in the unfinished eight microdistrict. No one saw her alive after that. At around that time, a drunk Devyatyorov, who was in the area to see a foreman, came across the schoolgirl just 20 meters from the entrance to the building where she lived. Using his technique, Devyatyorov went up to her and raped her, but supposedly accidentally strangled Vechkovskaya to death, as he claimed that used too much force.

Five more attacks occurred throughout October, on the 7th, 8th, 11th, 24th, and 28th. On Komsomol Day, in Krasnogvardeisky Prospekt, he attempted to rape Olga Kvaskshina, a girl who traveled with him on the bus, but her neighbor, who was following them from behind, intervened and managed to save her. Forty minutes later, Devyatyorov raped Larisa Samoylova at the next stop.

On November 4, 10, 15, 16, 19, and 25th, in the midst of the 50th anniversary of the October Revolution, authorities received multiple reports from women across different parts of Alma-Ata that they had been raped. It was then that investigators noticed the peculiar "nobility" of the criminal–he would wipe his victims' broken lips, talk to them about life, and cover them with his coat to keep them warm. In one instance, while dragging a victim across the tram, the girl lost her shoes—after he finished with the rape, Devyatyorov gave her his shoes and then walked her back home with only his socks on.

The crimes caused great outrage among the locals, and the local police department started a special investigation to catch the criminal. Female officers were used as decoys, while cadets were posted around the entire city in an attempt to catch the attacker red-handed. However, these measures were insufficient, and the killer was not caught.

On December 5, 7, 10, and 13th, new rapes were committed. In the last case, Devyatyorov dragged the victim, Vera Polyakova, to a transformer box at the corner of Shevchenko Street and 7th Line, where she began to scream for help. Suddenly, her father and sister, who knew that there was a rapist in the city and started searching for their relative when she did not return home, came rushing to her aid. Polyakova's father grabbed Devyatyorov by the hair and hit his head against the transformer, but the rapist managed to break free and escape. After this, Devyatyorov's head had to be bandaged due to his injury, a distinctive mark that remained until his eventual arrest.

==== Wrongful detention and police negligence ====
During the investigation, the local police department began tracking down all young men of European appearance who resembled their facial composite of the rapist, now including the head injury. Soon, a curious incident occurred: the police focused on a young man who lived on the same street as Devyatyorov, had an identical speech impediment, and looked exactly like him. Devyatyorov and two other young men were also questioned.

On 21 December, the police ordered Devyatyorov, his neighbor, and the two other men to attend an identity parade. For unclear reasons, none of the surviving victims identified him as the attacker, including Polyakova, who instead pointed towards Devyatyorov's neighbor. The young man was arrested, while Devyatyorov was released and went into hiding. After the arrest, the young man was interrogated for several hours before investigators conclusively decided that he was innocent and let him go.

The police's handling of this would later be heavily scrutinized due to the officers' negligence. This was exemplified by the fact that they missed out on several crucial details about Devyatyorov that would have readily identified him as the perpetrator – he got a notice for sick leave the day after the rapist received his head injury; he wore his winter coat without a belt, with said belt being dropped at a crime scene; and while searching his apartment, they were unable to locate a diary where he had marked the locations of all the attacks thus far.

==== Final attacks ====
After a brief lull, the rapes resumed at the end of February 1968. On 27 February, Devyatyorov committed a rape and his second murder; on International Women's Day, he committed two rapes and his third murder; on 15 March, he committed another rape, followed by an attempted murder three days later, and finally two more rapes on the 24th and 30th.

In February, Devyatyorov's relatives began to suspect that he was responsible, with his aunt becoming fully convinced that he was the elusive "Alma-Ata Strangler". However, she did not report him to the police–she instead advised him to leave Alma-Ata and return to Yakutia. Devyatyorov agreed, but decided to wait for his advance payment on 11 April, and then return to his homeland. By that time, he had already bought a ticket to the airport.

However, before leaving, he committed a fatal mistake that would result in his arrest–his final crime.

== Arrest, trial and execution ==
On 10 April, just a day prior to him leaving the city, Devyatyorov attacked another young woman, Tatyana Vasilenko, but she resisted him fiercely and kicked him hard in the groin. He quickly recovered and attacked her in a rage, chasing after the victim. At that moment, three police cadets (Vasily Glushchenko, Vladimir Stepanov and Alexey Ivanov) who were passing by noticed this and immediately subdued him.

While wainting for backup to arrive, the cadets tied Devyatyorov to a nearby wooden fence using rope (at the time, not all law enforcement officers had handcuffs). However, Devyatyorov broke free and began running down the street with the fence tied to his hands, eluding his pursuers and by jumping in some nearby bushes. However, he soon stumbled upon a bigger group of cadets, to whom he tried to lie, claiming that he had become rowdy while drunk and that his neighbors tied him up. Not long after, the initial group of cadets found them and explained what actually happened, after which they kept watch of him until the police car arrived approximately five hours later.

During the subsequent investigation, Devyatyorov agreed to cooperate and confessed to numerous attacks against women, including the three murders. He himself claimed that he had raped approximately 100 young women and girls, which investigators considered highly possible as there were many cases in which victims refused to go to the police out of fear they would be ostracized for being raped. In total, investigators conclusively linked at least 33 rapes to Devyatyorov—in 12 of these cases, including his first murder, the victims were minors.

Devyatyorov was later charged with multiple counts of rape and murder, with his trial lasting from July to August 1968. The trial was attended by journalists and the courtroom was packed with people. Throughout the proceedings, Devyatyorov remained calm and showed emotion, seemingly resigned with to the fact that he was going to be sentenced to death. Journalists noted that he was surprisingly well-groomed as well, as he often wore different classy suits at the proceedings—at his request, his relatives had sent his entire wardrobe to the detention center.

In an attempt to portray her son as innocent, Devyatyorov's mother provided the court with all of his awards, certificates, and positive character references from multiple people. This had no effect, however, and on 29 August 1968, the Supreme Court of the Kazakh SSR sentenced Devyatyorov to death. Since he did not appeal the verdict, Devyatyorov was executed ten days later at the SIZO-1 detention center via a single gunshot wound to the back of the head.

== See also ==
- List of serial killers by country
- List of serial rapists
- Volunteer (capital punishment)

== In the media and culture ==
The Devyatyorov case was covered in the 2019 episode "Marry Me!" (Russian: Выходи за меня!) from the documentary TV series "The investigation was conducted..." (Russian: Следствие вели). It was also briefly covered in the 2021 episode "Kazakhstani Maniacs" (Russian: Казахстанские маньяки) from the documentary TV series "The Investigation Has Established" (Russian: Следствием установлено).

== Bibliography ==
- Antoine Casse and Irina Kapitanova (2023). The phenomenon of Russian maniacs. The first large-scale study of maniacs and serial killers from the times of tsarism, the USSR and the Russian Federation (Russian: Феномен российских маньяков. Первое масштабное исследование маньяков и серийных убийц времен царизма, СССР и РФ), Eksmo, ISBN 5046081180
