= Billy Bailey =

American convicted murderer; last person to be hanged in the US

- Bailey at his clemency hearing
- Born: 1946; South Carolina, U.S.
- Died: January 25, 1996 (aged 49); James T. Vaughn Correctional Center, Delaware, U.S.
- Status: Executed by hanging
- Motive: Robbery
- Convictions: First degree murder (2 counts); First degree robbery Forgery; Possession of a deadly weapon during the commission of a felony (2 counts); Possession of a weapon by a prohibited person
- Penalty: Death (1980)

Details
- Victims: Gilbert Lambertson, 80; Clara Lambertson, 73
- Date: June 12, 1979
- Country: United States
- State: Delaware

Billy Bailey (1946 – January 25, 1996) was an American convicted murderer who was hanged in Delaware in 1996. He became the third person to be hanged in the United States since 1965 (the previous two were Charles Rodman Campbell and Westley Allan Dodd, both in Washington), and the first person hanged in Delaware in 50 years. As of 2026, he remains the last person to be lawfully executed by hanging in the United States.

== Early life ==
The nineteenth of 23 children, Bailey was born in stark poverty in South Carolina and suffered chronic physical abuse, state records show. His mother, Mazzie Miller Bailey, died when he was six months old and his father died when he was six. From the age of six to fourteen, Bailey lived in various foster homes. Bailey was later described as a long-time alcoholic with a "very, very violent, quick temper."

"If he wanted something, and if he wasn't going to get it right away, he'd explode."

When Bailey's daughter was three or four months old, she was burned badly in an accidental fire and had to have her hand amputated. His drinking problem worsened after his in-laws blamed him for the fire.

== Prior criminal history ==
As an adult, Bailey was known to police as a brawler and a thief.

Bailey had 10 prior convictions, including for six felonies. He had a criminal history dating back to 1967, when he was arrested for disorderly conduct after running down the street with a rifle. Bailey was later arrested on a charge of grand larceny in connection to a theft. In 1968, he was arrested a third time for burglarizing a home near Dover, Delaware. In 1974, he was arrested for stealing $1,500 worth of tools from a Dover industrial plant and sentenced to five years in prison. He was paroled in 1977, but was arrested for violating his parole in January 1979. He received an 18-month sentence for forgery. In August 1978, Bailey threatened to kill his wife, daughter, mother-in-law, and father-in law after his wife left him and refused to let him contact their daughter.

== Crime ==
In 1979, after serving four months of his 18-month sentence for forgery, Bailey was assigned to the Plummer House, a work release facility in Wilmington, Delaware. However, after being informed that he faced a potential 45-year sentence as a habitual offender, Bailey walked away from the work release center. He later appeared at the home of his foster sister, Sue Ann Coker, in Cheswold, Delaware, saying he was upset and was not going back to the Plummer House. Bailey attempted to kill himself, but was stopped from doing so by Coker.

"He tried to stab himself with a steak knife and cut my hand without meaning to when I was struggling with him for the knife."

He and Charles Coker, his foster sister's husband, went on an errand in Coker's truck. Bailey asked Coker to stop at a liquor store. Bailey entered the store and robbed the clerk at gunpoint. When the cashier, Reba Lovegrove, refused to cooperate, Bailey knocked her down and jammed the cash register while trying to open it. He then tried to shoot and kill Lovegrove, but the gun "clicked", either having jammed or run out of ammunition. Emerging from the store with a pistol in one hand and a bottle in the other, Bailey told Coker that the police would be arriving, and asked to be dropped at Lambertson's Corner, about 1.5 miles (2.4 km) away.

At Lambertson's Corner, Bailey entered the farmhouse of Gilbert Lambertson, aged 80, and his wife, Clara Lambertson, aged 73. Bailey shot Gilbert Lambertson twice in the chest with a pistol, and once in the head with the Lambertsons' shotgun. He also shot Clara Lambertson once in the shoulder with the pistol, and once each in the abdomen and neck with the shotgun. Both Lambertsons died. Bailey arranged their bodies in chairs, and then fled from the scene.

Bailey was spotted by a Delaware State Police helicopter as he ran across the Lambertsons' field. He tried to shoot the helicopter co-pilot with the pistol, but missed. When the pilot landed the chopper, a police officer jumped out and started chasing Bailey. He caught up with him after Bailey tripped and fell, put his foot on the shotgun, and ordered Bailey to stand up. As Bailey did this, he pulled another gun from his belt and fired at point blank range, but missed.

After his arraignment, Bailey said to the judge: "Go ahead and hang me you son-of-a-bitch. I killed them. Go ahead and kill me."

== Conviction ==
At Bailey's trial, his lawyer argued that he had acted under extreme emotional distress and should be found guilty of manslaughter instead of first degree murder. She pointed to Bailey's upbringing, his worsening drinking problems stemmed from recent events involving his family, and the state seeking to sentence him as a habitual offender. Ferman Franklin, an alcoholism counselor whom Bailey had visited on an outpatient basis, testified that Bailey was impulsive and emotionally unstable. Two psychiatrists summoned by the state testified that Bailey was neither psychotic nor mentally ill. The prosecution also pointed out that shotgun which Bailey used had only one barrel, meaning he would've needed to reload it three times.

In 1980, Bailey was convicted of first degree murder, first degree robbery possession of a deadly weapon by a prohibited person, and possession of a deadly weapon during the commission of a felony. Finding that his crimes "were outrageously or wantonly vile, horrible, or inhuman", the jury fixed his sentence as death for the murder convictions. Bailey was sentenced to death by hanging.

== Preparations ==
Although the method of execution in Delaware had been changed to lethal injection in 1986, he had the legal option of choosing to be hanged instead. Bailey refused to accept lethal injection, telling a visitor, "I'm not going to let them put me to sleep."

"Go ahead and hang me. You ain't putting me down like a dog. I was sentenced to hang so hang me."

A few days before his scheduled execution, the Delaware Board of Pardons refused to recommend clemency for Bailey. His attorney and sisters had pleaded for clemency, citing his upbringing.

As Delaware had not carried out a hanging in 50 years, state officials sought advice from corrections officials at Washington State Penitentiary in Walla Walla, Washington, where hangings had recently been performed. The wooden gallows were built on the grounds of the Delaware Correctional Center at Smyrna in 1986. The structure required renovation and strengthening before Bailey could be executed on it. The platform housing the trap door was 15 feet (4.6 m) from the ground and accessed by 23 steps.

Delaware used an execution protocol written by Fred Leuchter. Leuchter's protocol specified the use of 30 feet (9.1 m) of 0.75-inch (19 mm) diameter Manila hemp rope, boiled to take out stretch and any tendency to coil. The length of the rope sliding inside the knot was lubricated with melted paraffin wax, to allow it to slide freely. A black hood was specified by the protocol, as was a sandbag to test the trap door and a "collapse board" to which a prisoner could be strapped if necessary. Prison officials initially contracted Leuchter to build the gallows itself, but cut ties with him after he testified in the defense of Holocaust denier Ernst Zündel. Leuchter's protocol was still used after it was deemed reliable, but prison officials cross-referenced it with a U.S. Army manual on executions.

The day before, Bailey was weighed at 220 lb (100 kg), and the drop was determined to be around 5 feet (1.5 m).

Bailey was moved from his prison cell to the execution trailer used for lethal injection prior to the execution. There, he spent his last 24 hours, sleeping, eating, watching television, talking with staff, and meeting with his fifty-three-year-old sister, Betty Odom, the prison chaplain, and his attorney. For his last meal, he requested a well-done steak, a baked potato with sour cream and butter, buttered rolls, peas, and vanilla ice cream. Asked if he had any last words, Bailey replied, "No, sir."

His final appeals having failed, Bailey was hanged on January 25, 1996. The gallows in Delaware were dismantled in July 2003, because after that year, none of its death row inmates remained eligible to choose hanging over lethal injection. William H. Flamer, who was convicted of murdering his uncle and aunt in 1979, chose lethal injection and was executed on January 30, 1996. After James W. Riley, who had killed a man during a liquor robbery in 1982, refused to choose, the default method chosen for him was hanging. However, on May 19, 2003, Riley was resentenced to life in prison without parole after winning a retrial.

== See also ==
- Capital punishment in Delaware
- Capital punishment in the United States
- List of people executed in Delaware
- List of people executed in the United States in 1996
