= Killing of Stephen Ballard =

2017 homicide in Delaware

- Location of Bear within New Castle County
- Location: Bear, Delaware, U.S.
- Date: April 26, 2017; 9 years ago
- Attack type: Homicide by shooting
- Victims: Stephen J. Ballard, aged 32
- Perpetrators: Burgon Sealy, Jr.

Corporal Stephen J. Ballard (January 28, 1985 – April 26, 2017) was a Delaware State Police Officer. On April 26, 2017, Ballard was shot and killed after approaching a suspicious vehicle at a Wawa in Bear, Delaware. A day later, the perpetrator, Burgon Sealy, Jr. was shot and killed after a standoff with police.

== Killing ==
Ballard was shot and killed on April 26, 2017 after he approached a suspicious vehicle in the parking lot of a Wawa gas-station in Bear, Delaware. After asking the driver and passenger in the car for identification, Ballard asked the passenger, Burgon Sealy Jr., to step out of the car. Sealy got into a struggle with Ballard, then began shooting at him. When Ballard, who was unable to draw his weapon in time, attempted to find cover from Sealy, Sealy pursued and continued to shoot, hitting Ballard multiple times in the upper body and continuing to shoot even after the officer fell to the ground.

=== Victim ===
Ballard was born in Bowie, Maryland on January 28, 1985. He graduated from Delaware State University in 2007 with a degree in Criminal Justice, after which he was recruited into the Delaware State Police academy. He graduated from the academy in 2009. At the time of his death Ballard had served eight years on the Delaware State Police.

== Perpetrator shot and killed ==
| sentence = Law enforcement officers trailed the shooter, Burgon Sealy, Jr. (26), to his home on St. Michaels Drive in the Brick Mill Farm development of Middletown, Delaware. Sealy barricaded himself inside the house and a standoff with Delaware State Police and FBI agents ensued. In the early morning hours of April 27, 2017 authorities breached the house by using explosive charges to open windows and attempted to persuade Sealy to surrender. Sealy fired several rounds at police, then exited the house and was shot by police. He was pronounced dead at the scene.

== Reactions ==
The death of Ballard resulted in an outpouring of support for law enforcement in northern Delaware. Thousands of locals placed blue tape on their car's rear windows in a sign of appreciation towards police. Wawa donated 50,000 dollars to Ballard's family and set up donation drives at all of its Delaware locations. WSFS Bank and M&T Bank establishments in the area displayed signs of support for Ballard. DART First State offered free rides to the funeral events honoring Ballard.

On 5 May 2017 a large funeral honoring Ballard was held in Wilmington Delaware. The ceremony at the Chase Center was attended by hundreds of police officers from Delaware and other states. A funeral procession proceeded down Interstate 95 to New Castle, Delaware. Ballard was laid to rest in Gracelawn Memorial Cemetery.

=== Discussion of death penalty reinstatement ===
The shooting occurred shortly before Delaware legislators voted to postpone a vote on repealing the state's death penalty. Delaware Representative Steve Smyk, (Republican, District 20), a retired Delaware State Trooper, said he believed support for reinstating the death penalty had increased with this killings of Ballard and of Delaware prison guard Steven Floyd.

On May 9, 2017, Delaware House members voted to reinstate the death penalty citing Ballard's killing as one of the motivating reasons. However, the bill failed to get a committee hearing in the state Senate. In May 2019, Smyk introduced a similar bill.
