= Murder in Delaware law =

Aspect of Delaware criminal law

Murder in Delaware law constitutes the unlawful killing, under circumstances defined by law, of people within or under the jurisdiction of the U.S. state of Delaware.

The United States Centers for Disease Control and Prevention reported that in the year 2022, the state had a murder rate slightly above the median for the entire country.

== Definitions ==
=== First-degree murder ===
Delaware has eight different levels of homicide offenses in total, although some overlap. The most serious form of homicide, first-degree murder, constitutes the intentional killing of a person without legal justification or an unintentional killing during the commission of a felony (the felony murder rule). Additionally, Delaware is one of the only states where intentionally causing someone to commit suicide under duress is punishable as first-degree murder. The crime of first-degree murder is punishable for those over the age of 18 only by life imprisonment without the possibility of parole or re-sentencing. The state previously punished first-degree murder by either life-without-parole or the death penalty, but Delaware's death penalty statute was ruled unconstitutional in 2016, and the statute was fully repealed in 2024. In 2013, Delaware passed legislation eliminating life-without-parole sentences for first-degree murders committed while the perpetrator was under the age of 18. For juveniles, the sentence is a minimum of 25 years in prison and a maximum of life imprisonment with the possibility of re-sentencing.

=== Second-degree murder ===
Second-degree murder under Delaware law is the killing of a victim when the perpetrator recklessly causes the death of another person under circumstances which manifest a cruel, wicked, and depraved indifference to human life. It is punishable by a minimum of 15 years in prison and a maximum of life imprisonment without parole.

=== Felony murder rule ===
Like most states, Delaware employs the standard of the felony murder rule. A murder where a victim dies during or shortly after the commission (or attempted commission) of any felony due to the offender's reckless conduct is punishable as first-degree murder. If it is during negligent conduct, it is punishable as second-degree murder.

=== Murder by abuse or neglect ===
Two other forms of murder in Delaware law are first- and second-degree murder by abuse or neglect of a minor. First-degree murder by abuse or neglect constitutes when a perpetrator recklessly causes the death of a child through an act of abuse and/or neglect of the child or when the perpetrator has engaged in a previous pattern of abuse and/or neglect of the child. It is punishable by 15 years to life imprisonment without the possibility of parole, the same as second-degree murder. Second-degree murder by abuse or neglect constitutes when a perpetrator causes the death of a child through criminal negligence. It is punishable by 10 to 25 years in prison.

== Penalties ==
The sentences for homicide offenses in Delaware are listed below.

Offense	Mandatory sentence
Criminally negligent homicide	Up to 8 years in prison
Second-degree vehicular homicide	Up to 8 years in prison
First-degree vehicular homicide	Up to 15 years in prison
Manslaughter	2 to 25 years in prison
Second-degree murder by abuse or neglect	10 to 25 years in prison
Second-degree murder	Minimum of 15 years in prison; Maximum of life in prison without parole
Official misconduct causing death	Minimum of 15 years in prison; Maximum of life in prison without parole
First-degree murder by abuse or neglect	Minimum of 15 years in prison; Maximum of life in prison without parole
First-degree murder	For adults: Life imprisonment without the possibility of parole or re-sentencing For juveniles: 25 years in prison to life imprisonment with the possibility of re-sentencing after 20 years
