= James T. Vaughn Correctional Center =

State prison for men in New Castle County, Delaware, USA

Coordinates: 39.333°N 75.5995°W

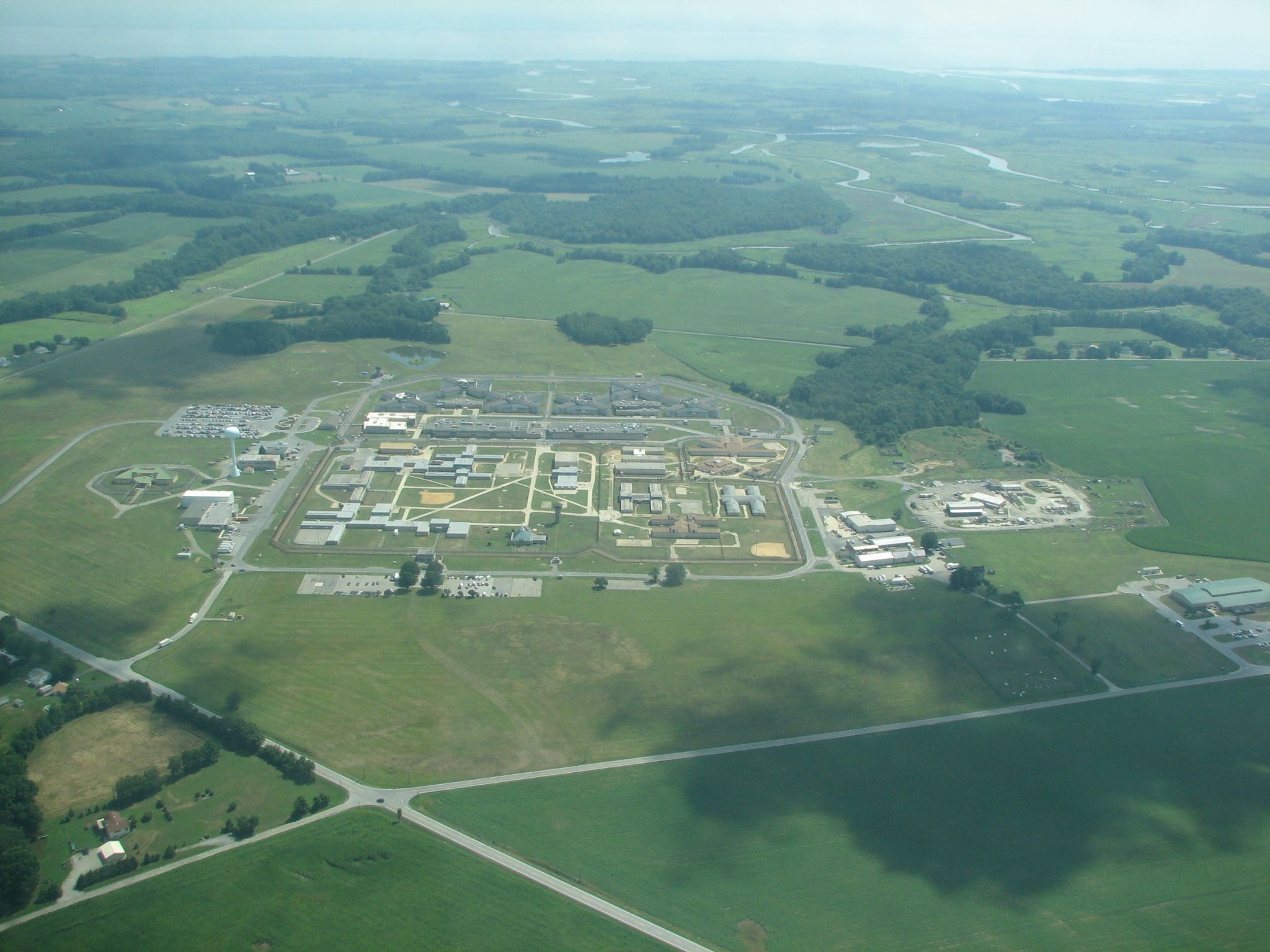
- Interactive map of James T. Vaughn Correctional Center
- Location: Smyrna, Delaware
- Status: Open
- Security class: maximum, medium, and minimum
- Capacity: 2600
- Opened: 1971
- Managed by: Delaware Department of Correction

The James T. Vaughn Correctional Center (JTVCC), formerly the Delaware Correctional Center (DCC), is a state prison for men in unincorporated New Castle County, Delaware, USA, with a Smyrna post office address. It is the Delaware Department of Correction's largest correctional facility.

JTVCC houses some 2,500 minimum, medium, and maximum security inmates. It is also the primary facility for housing the Kent County pre-trial (detainee) population.

Before the abolition of capital punishment in Delaware, the state's death row for men was located here. The death row for women was located in the Delores J. Baylor Women's Correctional Institution. Executions occurred at JTVCC.

The facility is named for former Delaware State Senator James T. Vaughn, who died in 2007. In 2008 Governor of Delaware Ruth Minner signed a bill confirming the rename.

== History ==
In 1996, construction began on a $110 million, 888-bed addition which included 600 maximum security cells in six units. The new addition houses the Security Housing Unit (SHU) and the Medium Housing Unit (MHU).

Inmates in the SHU, which formerly included the prison's death row, occupy single-bunked cells in which they are locked down and receive seventeen and a half hours a week out of their cell for recreational purposes. Inmates may earn their way out of the SHU through good behavior.

In 2015, the prison became a subject of an ACLU lawsuit, due to the use of solitary confinement for mentally ill inmates. Further lawsuits have been filed due to the Delaware State Correction's decision to feed some inmates "baked slop," while other states have discontinued the use of such meals.

== Incidents ==
On July 12, 2004, 45-year-old inmate Scott Miller, armed with a shank, took a 27-year-old female prison counselor hostage. Miller raped the woman whom he held for seven hours before being shot and killed. Miller, a convicted serial rapist, was serving a 694-year sentence at the time.

On February 1, 2017, inmates took control of Building C, initially holding five correctional officers as hostages according to media reports. This building houses about 100 inmates. The incident was first reported by a correctional officer's radio call for "immediate assistance" at 10:38 a.m. The prison, and all other prisons within Delaware, were placed on lockdown. One hostage was released a few hours later, and taken to a hospital with 'non-life threatening' injuries. Later that evening, two other hostages were reportedly released. When the hostage situation ended, one hostage, identified as correctional officer and 16-year veteran Sgt. Steven Floyd, was killed and another was injured. The incident led to a proposal to reinstate the death penalty in Delaware.

== Notable inmates ==
- Billy Bailey, convicted murderer, last man to be executed by hanging in the United States
- Thomas Capano
- Steven W. Shelton, one of three men convicted in murder of Wilson Mannon, executed in 1995
- Nelson Shelton, one of three men convicted in murder of Wilson Mannon, serving a 40-year sentence
- Jack Foster Outten Jr., one of three men convicted in murder of Wilson Mannon, serving a 38-year sentence
- Billy Glaze, convicted serial killer whose guilt has been questioned, died in prison in 2015
- Steven Brian Pennell, serial killer, executed in 1992
- James Allen Red Dog, serial killer, executed in 1993
- Earl Bradley (previously in Vaughn's SHU: in 2016, he was moved to an out-of-state prison)
- Jerome Franks

== See also ==
- Dawson v. Delaware
