= Henry Reed =

Henry Reed may refer to:

== People ==
- Henry Reed (American football) (born 1948), American football player
- Henry Reed (cricketer) (1892–1963), English cricketer
- Henry Reed (merchant) (1806–1880), British merchant, philanthropist and evangelist
- Henry Reed (musician) (1884–1968), Appalachian fiddler and banjoist, associated with folklorist Alan Jabbour
- Henry Reed (poet) (1914–1986), British poet
- Henry Reed (Wisconsin legislator), Democratic member of the Wisconsin State Assembly
- Henry Armstrong Reed (1858–1876), killed at Battle of the Little Bighorn, nephew of George Armstrong Custer
- Henry Byron Reed (1855–1896), Member of Parliament
- Herbert Reed (British Army soldier) (Henry Herbert Reed, died 1940), British sailor, George Cross recipient
- Henry Hope Reed (1808–1854), American educator
- Henry Hope Reed Jr. (1915–2013), American architecture critic and preservationist
- Henry Thomas Reed (1846–1924), U.S. federal judge
- Henry Reed (I Know Why the Caged Bird Sings), a student mentioned in Maya Angelou's autobiography I Know Why the Caged Bird Sings
- Henry A. Reed, officer in the United States Army

== Fictional characters ==
- Henry Reed (character), in children's novels by Keith Robertson

== See also ==
- Henry Reid, former director of UCLA’s willed body program
- Henry Read (1890–1963), Anglican bishop in North India
- Henry English Read (1824–1868), American politician
- Henry Reade (1840–1884), English first-class cricketer, clergyman and educator
- Henry Reade (FRS) (c. 1716–1762), English academic and government official
- Harry Reid (disambiguation)
