= CTBS =

CTBS may refer to:

- Certified Tissue Bank Specialist
- Comprehensive Test of Basic Skills
- Di-N-acetylchitobiase, encoded by the CTBS gene
