= Harry Read =

Harry Read may refer to:

- Harry Read (footballer) (1885–1951), English footballer
- Harry Read (Salvationist) (1924–2021), English commissioner in the Salvation Army
- Harry Read (sportsman) (1888–1972), Irish cricketer and rugby union player

== See also ==
- Harry Reid (disambiguation)
- Harry Reed, American comedian
