= David Mason (murderer) =

American serial killer (1956–1993)

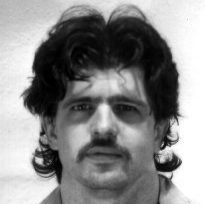
- CDCR Inmate Photograph
- Born: David Edwin Mason; December 2, 1956; Statesboro, Georgia, U.S.
- Died: August 24, 1993 (aged 36); San Quentin State Prison, San Quentin, California, U.S.
- Cause of death: Execution by gas chamber
- Convictions: First degree murder with special circumstances (5 counts); Assault with a deadly weapon Robbery
- Penalty: Death (January 27, 1984)

Details
- Victims: 5–6
- Span of crimes: March 6, 1980 – May 8, 1982
- Country: United States
- State: California
- Date apprehended: February 4, 1981

David Edwin Mason (December 2, 1956 – August 24, 1993) was an American serial killer who killed at least four elderly people between March and December 1980 in Oakland, California, his cellmate in 1982 and possibly his male lover. For these crimes, he was sentenced to death and executed at San Quentin State Prison's gas chamber in 1993, the last inmate to have been executed in this manner in the state. He was also the first condemned inmate since the reinstatement of the death penalty to voluntarily withdraw all of his appeals.

== Childhood ==
David Edwin Mason was born on December 2, 1956, in Statesboro, Georgia, the eldest son and fourth of eight total children born to Harris and Margie Mason. According to his father, David was the result of an unwanted pregnancy, as his mother tried to induce a miscarriage by lifting furniture and riding horses. Shortly after his birth, the family moved to Oakland, California. Mason's parents were strict fundamentalist Pentecostals, as a result of which they would subject their children to harsh physical, psychological and verbal abuse if any of them showed what they considered a "lack of enthusiasm" in religious activities. David and his siblings would later recall that they spent most of their time on the territory of the house or in church.

Unable to bear relentless bullying, Mason first attempted suicide at age 5 by swallowing several dozen tablets. Later on in life, both of his parents admitted that they beat David for even minuscule reasons, and Mason himself claimed that on at least two occasions, his mother had inflicted more than 100 hits during a punishment session with a belt, switch or pancake turner. In the mid-1960s, Mason began to exhibit concerning behavior and signs of mental illness - at the age of 8, his father found him standing in front of his younger brother's crib with a knife in his hand, for which he was beaten. Unable to control his behavior, Mason's parents began to lock David in his room for prolonged periods of time, installing a grate with steel bars on the window. In one case, while he was in "the dungeon" as it was called, 11-year-old David defecated himself, and when his mother discovered this, she forced him to wear the soiled underwear on his head.

In subsequent years, Mason made several more suicide attempts, at various times trying to commit suicide by self-immolation, hanging, setting his clothes on fire, cutting his veins and throwing himself down the stairs. During this period, he attacked other children and teachers alike, earning a reputation as a bully, and attempted to set fire to neighboring houses, his school and the church. In 1970, Mason was arrested for several petty offences, after which he reported his parents' ill-treatment of him to the authorities. He underwent a psychiatric reevaluation, which determined that he had an IQ of 110 and a good learning ability, but also showed signs of PTSD, for which he was sent to a boarding school with his parents' permission.

Mason escaped from the boarding school and returned home on several occasions, claiming that he had been sexually abused by the staff and other children, but each time was forcibly returned. In 1973, he was arrested and convicted for yet another arson, for which he was given several months imprisonment at a juvenile detention center, returning home after finishing the sentence. The following year, he dropped out of school shortly before finishing the 11th grade and enlisted in the Marine Corps, but quickly lost interest in military service. During his first few weeks, Mason committed numerous offenses and was disciplined several times, resulting in his dismissal from the Marines four months later and his return to his parents' house.

== Criminal history ==
After returning to Oakland, Mason supported himself through odd jobs and prostitution. On July 8, 1977, Mason stabbed store clerk Virginia Jansen with an ice pick in the back after robbing a store in San Leandro, before stealing her pocket money and $270 from the cash register. He threatened to kill her if she called the police and testified against him, cleaned his fingerprints from various objects, and left. Jansen was hospitalized for her wound but survived. She positively identified Mason after his photograph was presented to her. An arrest warrant was issued, and he voluntarily surrendered to police. At trial, Mason pleaded guilty to the crimes. Mason was sentenced in November 1977 to 36 months in state prison, and was paroled on July 13, 1979.

== Murders ==
Mason's first victim was 73-year-old Joan Picard, whom he had known for 8 years and had performed various cleaning and gardening work in his youth. Since he frequently visited her house, he knew that the elderly woman had a collection of rare antique coins, and due to her fear of robbers, Picard had shown him how the alarm system works, letting him know how to turn it off. On March 6, 1980, in desperate need for cash, Mason went to Picard's house and, threatening her with a weapon, demanded that she hand over her coin collection, money and any other valuables. During the robbery, the woman unsuccessfully attempted to turn on the alarm, causing Mason to choke her into unconsciousness. He then used his time to loot money and valuables, but Picard soon woke up and attempted to flee. Mason caught up to her, then beat and tied Picard with electric wire before finally strangling her, to get rid of any witnesses to the crime. That same evening, he sold the coins for $85. Picard's body, clad only in her blue skirt and bra, was found two days later by her daughter. The living room, stairs and bedroom were covered in bloodstains, and it appeared that the killer had removed her sweater by force, due to which fragments of buttons were found in different rooms.

Mason's second victim was 83-year-old Arthur Jennings, a known homosexual notorious for paying teenagers and young men for sexual services. David himself later alleged that he had had sex with Jennings on several occasions since his school years, either in his car or at his house. On August 18, 1980, he went to his house and subsequently strangled Jennings. After killing him, Mason stole $16 and a ring that the old man had been given while serving in the army during World War I.

On November 16, 1980, Mason broke into the high-rise apartment of 75-year-old Antoinette Brown, whom he beat and then strangled with a knot made from underwear and other clothing. After the murder, he stole some rings and money, leaving Brown's body almost completely naked. During the investigation, the victim's neighbor, Paula White, told police that she had met the alleged killer, who was exiting the elevator at the ground floor, at around 4:00 pm. She gave a physical description of Mason, from which a facial composite was made.

On December 6, 1980, Mason broke into the second-storey apartment of 72-year-old Dorothy Lang, whom he immediately attacked. The victim resisted fiercely, making Mason strike her several times on the head and chest with a wrench, fracturing several ribs, before finally strangling her with his bare hands. After the murder, he stole a number of valuables from the apartment, and then stripped Lang's clothing, leaving only a sweater and bra on, which he pushed up to her neck.

== Arrest, confessions and new murder ==
On January 6, 1981, four weeks after the murder of Dorothy Lang, Mason drove past a patrol car in Alameda County near I-580, driving at high speeds in his Dodge Charger. Trying to avoid pursuit, Mason exited the freeway and entered a residential area, where he passed several streets before he wound up at a dead-end, which forced him to abandon the car. He managed to escape the police on foot, but while searching the interior of his car, authorities found his documents and a receipt from a car repair shop, which indicated the address of his parents' residence. On January 22, police officer Larry Schuchert visited Mason's parents' home in San Lorenzo and spoke with his mother and his brother Mark. Mark told Schuchert that David had left the house several days prior and gave them an audio cassette with the words "David E. Mason - Epitaph" written on it, with notes additionally asking that they keep it should something happen to him. With the family's permission, Schuchert played the cassette, which contained a recording of David confessing to a long list of violent crimes. In the tape, he described the circumstances of the murders in details only known to the police, his motives, parts of his biography and his position in life, and at the end of the tape, he expressed his belief that he would die in a shootout with police.

On the basis of these confessions, a warrant was issued for his arrest, and on February 4, 1981, Mason was arrested without incident at a Holiday Inn. During his interrogation at the police station, he again reiterated his claims from the tape, and additionally confessed to the murder of his 55-year-old lover Robert Groff, a dog business owner who lived in a trailer in Butte County. Mason claimed that after one of their dates, Groff told him that he had intentionally infected him with herpes, after which the two got into a fight. As a result, in the late fall of 1980, Mason went to Groff's trailer and shot him while he slept, after which he looted the trailer.

Mason was taken to the Alameda County Jail to await trial. On May 8, 1982, 24-year-old Boyd Wayne Johnson, who had been arrested for the rape-murder of Patricia Garcia in Redding, was also interned to await trial there. Once in prison, Johnson demanded to be put in solitary confinement and isolated from the other prisoners, refusing to communicate with anyone, especially concerning the reason for his arrest. While conversing with other prisoners, Mason heard claims that Johnson was actually an informant who had previously testified against other criminals as a witness to the prosecution. On the advice of one of the guards, Mason and a number of other inmates watched an evening local news report about Johnson and his crime, after which Mason announced that he would "be sentenced to a short imprisonment term". On that same evening, he proposed to fellow inmates Nathaniel Yancey, Quentin Shorter and Maurice Grant to kill Johnson, to which all but Shorter refused. And so, in the early morning, Mason and Shorter burst into Johnson's cell and attacked him. While he resisted violently, Johnson was overpowered, severely beaten and finally strangled with a towel. After killing him, Mason and Shorter went to the shower room, carrying Johnson's body along, which they then hung from a water pipe, trying to present it as a suicide. After the body was discovered, all the inmates were questioned as to what had happened, and during the investigation, Shorter confessed that he and Mason had killed him, a claim later confirmed by Yancey and Grant. The prison authorities searched through Mason's cell and personal belongings, finding blood stains on his towel and shoes, as well as numerous abrasions and bruises on Mason himself, indicating that he recently been in a struggle. Blood particles and skin were extracted from under the fingernails of the murdered inmate, and a DNA test was quickly matched to Mason's blood group.

== Trial ==
David Mason's trial opened in late 1983. At the trial, he retracted his initial testimony and pleaded not guilty to all charges, claiming that he had an alibi for the day that Arthur Jennings had been murdered. Mason stated that he had been working at the Thrift Town second-hand shop on that day and presented a timesheet, which displayed that he had been at the store at 12:31 pm and left at 9:02 pm. However, the court dismissed this as proof of his innocence, since Mason's brother and his close friend, Karen Warden, also worked there, and could have easily falsified the records. Mason also denied any involvement in Brown's murder, claiming that on November 16, he had been in Groff's trailer, 145 miles away from the crime scene. Groff's neighbor later confirmed these claims, saying that on that evening he had helped Mason and Groff install a new water heater; the neighbor's wife later claimed that her husband had been mistaken about the dates, and that the installation had taken place on November 23, a week after the murder. She later provided evidence that the couple had been staying with relatives in Yuba City at the time, and had only returned on November 23. Mason also claimed that on the day of Lang's murder, he had been staying at the house of his friend Patricia Buckley in Berkeley. Buckley later confirmed his claims, affirming that between 5 pm and 10 pm, Mason had not left the house. Nonetheless, Mason was found guilty of five murders and sentenced to death on January 27, 1984; no charges were brought in the murder of Groff, although he remained a suspect in that case.

== Execution ==
After his conviction, Mason was transferred to the San Quentin State Prison to await execution, where he spent the remainder of his life. While in prison, he married a woman named Charlene, fully admitted guilt for his crimes and expressed remorse for what he had done. In the early 1990s, his lawyer drew up an appeal, arguing that his client's sentence be commuted to life imprisonment, citing his abusive childhood and mental issues. Despite the likelihood of a new trial and the overturning of his death sentence, Mason voluntarily withdrew his appeal in June 1993, setting his execution date for August 24, 1993. He later claimed that his decision was influenced by his remorse and a desire to teach a lesson to other criminals, so that they would not repeat his mistakes.

In July of that same year, journalists visited him on death row, and Mason gave a 90-minute interview in which he talked about the last 9 years of his life. In it, he said that he had embraced humanism, that he came to understand the pain he had caused to the families of his victims, and declared his readiness to take responsibility for his actions. He also said that he had no intention of changing his decision, in spite of receiving over 200 letters from various people begging him to renew his appeal and two lawsuits by anti-death penalty activists.

After refusing to file appeals, in August 1993, Mason's lawyer, Charles Marson, claimed that his client was insane and unable to make decisions of this magnitude of his own accord. Marson filed an appeal to the United States Court of Appeals for the Ninth Circuit, requesting that Mason be given a new psychiatric examination, but a panel of three judges ruled that his client had a right to decide his own fate. Mason fired Marson and was assigned a new lawyer. Mason would spend the last day of his life with members of his family, refusing a last meal and instead asked that he and his family dine on the same food provided to other prisoners. Mason also refused to confess to a priest, and asked permission from the prison administration for unlimited use of the telephone in his last hours. His only special request was a glass of ice water. California state officials said that Mason can stop the execution at any time - even when tied to the chair in the gas chamber - by simply stating that he wanted to file an appeal, which was already drafted by his lawyer. In case he changed his mind, prison administration installed a telephone in the gas chamber by which Mason, if he so desired, could contact his new lawyer Mike Brady. Brady, in turn, would contact the 9th Circuit, who would order that the execution be halted, extending Mason's life by another three years. Mason never did so, and before the execution, he requested that none of his family members be witnesses of his death, wishing that they remember him as they last saw him on their final visits.

David Mason was executed on August 24, 1993, at 12:23 local time, seven minutes after entering the gas chamber. Before his execution, he was told where his lawyer was among the witnesses, and if he changed his mind, he would only have to blink twice to signal that he wanted to stop the execution. According to Brady, however, once he was told that, Mason refused to look in his direction. In later statement, Warden Daniel Vasquez said that Mason refused to issue a final statement, saying only the following: "No Warden, I want to proceed; thank you Warden."

== Victims ==
Number	Name	Sex	Age	Date of death
1	Joan Picard	F	73	March 6, 1980
2	Arthur Jennings	M	83	August 18, 1980
3	Antoinette Brown	F	75	November 16, 1980
4	Dorothy Lang	F	75	December 6, 1980
5	Boyd Wayne Johnson	M	24	May 8, 1982

== See also ==
- Capital punishment in California
- List of people executed in California
- List of people executed in the United States in 1993
- List of serial killers in the United States
- Volunteer (capital punishment)

Executions carried out in California
Preceded by Robert Alton Harris April 21, 1992	David Edwin Mason; August 24, 1993	Succeeded by William George Bonin February 23, 1996
Executions carried out in the United States
Preceded by Ruben Montoya Cantu – Texas August 24, 1993	David Edwin Mason – California; August 24, 1993	Succeeded by Michael Alan Durocher – Florida August 25, 1993
