= Tissue bank =

A tissue bank is an establishment that collects and recovers human cadaver tissue for the purposes of medical research, education and allograft transplantation. A tissue bank may also refer to a location where biomedical tissue is stored under cryogenic conditions and is generally used in a more clinical sense.

The United States Navy Tissue Bank is generally accepted as the first full tissue banking service of its kind in the world although it is not the largest or only tissue bank today.

== Donating a body ==
Most medical schools need donated bodies for teaching students about the anatomy and physiology of the body, as well as how to perform medical procedures. There are no upper age limits for donating your body to science. Each school has different policies and procedures for donated bodies.

Act 368 of the Public Acts of Michigan 1978, Article 10, Part 101, authorizes an individual to will their body to a medical institution. Medical institutions will only accept a full body, meaning the body cannot be used for organ donation prior to body donation because it would leave the body incomplete. At the time of death, the institution where the body is being donated to should be contacted as soon as possible. The decision to accept or reject the donation will be made at that time. A body could be turned away if it has already begun decomposing, the person was extremely obese, recent surgery was conducted, thoughts of possible contagious disease or severe trauma to the body occurred. There is no an age restriction as long as the donor or the donor’s legal representative gives consent. It is very uncommon for a school to turn down a body due to having an adequate supply; they are always in high demand. At Michigan State University people can choose whether to donate their body for three years or without any restriction as to the length of time. A body donated for an indefinite period can be used for educational purposes as long as it remains an effective teaching tool. At the end of that time the body is cremated and the family's instructions for disposition are followed.

In Brazil, the Brazilian Legal Code allows teaching to be done on cadavers that are unclaimed from the Institutes of Forensic Medicine. This means that if a family does not claim a body, it gets put to use for teaching purposes. The number of cadavers available for teaching has declined in Brazil due to an increasing number of families choosing to claim their relative's body. Many Brazilians are unaware that a body can be voluntarily donated to a university after death, which also contributes to the shortage of cadavers for teaching. In 2008, a program officially started at The Federal University of Health Sciences of Porto Algre making body donation official and also creating terms that the donor must agree to so that the program does not come under legal trouble. This provides the university background information about the donor as well, which may be beneficial to research or use of the body.

In the Netherlands, organ donation and whole body donation are regulated by two separate acts and have distinct differences. The Organ Donation Act regulates organ donation in the Netherlands during life and after death. The Burial and Cremation Act regulates whole body donation. This document states that body donation to science is a third party option of body disposal. Organ donors are actively recruited by the Dutch government whereas body donors are not. A contract must be signed by both the institute and the donor to donate one's body. After organ donation, the body is returned to the family for burial or cremation. Whole body donation uses the entire body and no part of it is returned to the family. Any remains from scientific study are cremated.

=== Organ Donation ===
There are different types of body donations that involve different organs. Organ donation and whole body donation are not one and the same. The body needs to be complete in order for many medical institutions to accept the bodies. This means that specific organ donation may not occur before a whole body is donated.

Blood, bone marrow, eye, kidney, liver, lung, pancreas, and tissue are acceptable organs for donation.

=== Willed Body Donation ===
A Willed Body Donation program is a program that allows people to donate their bodies after death. Most U.S. tissue bank companies get their supply of cadaver tissue through Willed Body Donation programs run by the tissue bank itself.

These programs then charge their customers (mainly medical instrument companies) for services associated with preparation of the cadaver tissue (e.g. transportation, refrigeration, and recovery) rather than charging money for the donated tissue itself, though it is not illegal to do so for non-transplant and or research organizations per the Uniform Anatomical Gift Act as it is for transplant and/or therapy.

The American Association of Tissue Banks (AATB) is the most recognized accrediting body for American tissue banks.

- Many universities across the U.S. also offer tissue to surgical training facilities meant for medical research and education on cadaveric specimens. Most universities obtain this tissue through their own whole body donation programs.
- In 1991, Dr. Hans Burchard of the AATB stated that over 300,000 musculoskeletal grafts are transplanted annually.

At the first European Conference on Problems of Tissue Banking and Clinical Applications, held in Berlin on Oct 24-26, 1991, many European countries joined together to adapt common practices regarding tissue banks and the European Association of Tissue Banks was created.

- The first conference represented 17 countries but by 1998, 46 countries were represented
- In Eastern Europe, the Humboldt University Medical School has had a tissue bank since 1956 and supplied 50,000 bone grafts to more than 250 hospitals between 1956 and 1991.
- Throughout Europe, the European Bone Bank Foundation, Bone Implant Services, and the Euro-Skin Bank are a few organizations that prepare donated grafts for surgery.
- Pakistan, Indonesia, Bangladesh, and Malaysia use amnion in reconstructive surgery and burns.

== Commerce ==
Body brokers are firms or individuals that buy and sell cadaver human body parts for use of research. Trade in these body parts is performed in a manner similar to other raw materials, though many brokers insist they charge fees as opposed to selling body parts.

== Procedures ==
House Bill 4341 was passed in 2014 regarding permission given to all schools in Michigan to receive cadavers for the promotion of education. The medical school must have a mortuary license. The law protects the bodies to be used from anything other than learning purposes. The school has to be credited by the Department of Community Health in order to receive a body and to be able to practice on it. There is a limit to the number of cadavers they have at one point in time at the house.

At the University of Washington, a body may be refused if there are signs of decomposition, severe trauma, infectious diseases, significant bedsores, obesity, jaundice, recent surgeries, or autopsied remains. The University of Washington’s School of Medicine has a continuing need for donated bodies to the Willed Body Program and accepts bodies of ages 18 years and older anywhere and only in the state of Washington. The School of Medicine is to be notified immediately at time of death. If the potential donor family does not call at this time, the donation is cancelled. The family is to be informed of any and all decisions made regarding body donation. When the study is complete, the cremated remains are either buried at the university community plot or are sent to the person on the Donor Registration Form, both at no cost.

=== Costs ===
Families will not receive compensation for the body donation. The school will typically pay for cremation costs, transportation costs and embalming. The family takes over cost responsibility of embalming if they request a funeral and the funeral home provides this service. The family is also responsible in making alternate arrangements for final disposition if the donation cannot be completed for reasons previously stated.

== Uses ==
Anatomy is taught in the first year of most medical schools and serves as the foundation for many other courses during a medical student’s education. The donated bodies are used in anatomy labs as a learning tool giving students hands on experience. According to research done, the use of real bodies as opposed to computer stimulation has produced a better understanding of anatomy in students. The research, appearing in Anatomical Sciences Education, compared the use of cadaver based learning and computer based learning of human body structures. This research showed higher scores on anatomy exams for students using cadavers for learning opposed to computer stimulation. Uses for the bodies include teaching other health fields as well, such as nursing or physical therapy. Current physicians use bodies to study new surgical procedures before practicing on live patients. The cadaver should be donated to the nearest medical school and not cross state lines. Faculty, staff, and students of health professions are authorized to use the anatomy lab and outsiders are restricted access. Outside of the medical field, bodies can be used for research to increase safety in military, law enforcement, sports and transportation crashes.

== Ethical considerations ==
There is no common model used between organizations to determine whether utilization of cadaveric images is ethical or not. There is no agreement made with the donor about images being taken or used for any purposes after death so current practice is that the choice is up to the organization in possession of the cadaver. If images of a cadaver were to end up in the wrong hands, there are no laws or guidelines in place as to what can be done with the images. Technology makes up a large portion of information transfer so it is likely that this could happen through hacking or misappropriation of images.

In one study published by Clinical Anatomy, doctors unanimously agreed that willed body donations are important for teaching and learning purposes, but only 52% of male doctors consented to donation of their own body and only 29% of female doctors consented. This study found that the actions of doctors while in anatomy labs and other areas where they have been exposed to a cadaver have led them to avoid donating their own bodies.

Willed body donation programs do not always run smoothly, as is evident in the 2004 case against UCLA for distribution of body parts to other companies under the pretense that they had already been tested for infectious diseases. Specifically, Johnson & Johnson was purchasing body parts from the director of UCLA’s willed body program at a steep price. The representative from Johnson & Johnson claimed that he had no reason to suspect that the body parts were distributed to him illegally.
