= Harry Reid (disambiguation) =

Harry Reid (1939–2021) was an American politician who served as the senior United States senator from Nevada, from 1987 to 2017.

Harry Reid may also refer to:

== People ==
- Harry Reid (bishop) (1866–1943), Bishop of Edinburgh
- Harry Avery Reid (1877–1947), director of Veterinary Services in New Zealand
- Harry Fielding Reid (1859–1944), American geophysicist
- Harry Reid (journalist) (born 1947), Scottish journalist and author
- Harry Reid (actor) (born 1992), British actor

== Transport ==
- Harry Reid International Airport, airport serving Las Vegas, Nevada, U.S.

== See also ==
- Henry Reid, former director of UCLA's willed body program who sold donated body parts to drug companies
- Henry Reed (disambiguation)
- Harold Reid (born 1939), former bass singer for the country vocal group The Statler Brothers
- Harry Reed (fl. 1892–1909), African-American comedian
- Harry Read (disambiguation)
