= 3D Indiana =

3D Indiana is a commercial Educational software for teaching and research on the human anatomy. The name is an acronym for Three-Dimensional Interactive Digital Anatomy. This software is based on the principles of volumetric anatomy which uses three intersecting coordinate planes to locate the organs of the human body based on mathematical calculations. This is in contrast to the traditional method of describing the location of the organs in relation to one another. The Gall bladder is traditionally described thus: 'It is situated on the right side of the body closely in contact with the inferior surface of the liver, along the right edge of the quadrate lobe in a shallow fossa extending from the right edge of the porta hepatis to the inferior lobe of the liver'.

== History ==
This patent-pending software was designed by the Kalister Foundation led by Jerome Kalister, an alumnus of TD Medical College, Alapuzha, Kerala, India. A team of about fifteen professionals of the Foundation worked for nearly three years to create the software. It was formally unveiled at TD Medical College by Jerome Kalister on 13 October 2008 before an audience of more than a thousand students and staff of various medical colleges in Kerala.

== Features ==
According to its creators, 3D Indiana is a virtual human body and its use would be complementary to the conventional mode of anatomy studies. Eventually this software may replace the human cadavers in anatomical studies. Without any additional programming, a researcher could elicit normal body responses from this virtual body. This gives the package the potential as a tool for doing clinical trials of drugs and chemicals in it.

Every named structure in the body is digitally recreated in detail and deployed in their true anatomical positions in the body. By clicking on any part of the body using a computer mouse, the user can get the name of the part displayed and can zoom in, rotate or isolate the part for further details.

== Endorsements ==
The 3D Indiana package has been already endorsed by the Anatomical society of India. The Kalister Foundation is in discussion with the National Rural Health Mission for its endorsement of 3D Indiana as an educational software suitable for application in medical colleges.

== See also ==
- Visible Human Project
- Primal Pictures
