= Execution of Frederick Lashley =

Missouri's first and only execution of a juvenile for murder

Frederick Lashley
- Born: Frederick Lashley; March 10, 1964; Missouri, U.S.
- Died: July 28, 1993 (aged 29); Potosi Correctional Center, Mineral Point, Missouri, U.S.
- Cause of death: Execution by lethal injection
- Known for: Controversial execution and Missouri's first and only juvenile execution since 1930
- Conviction: Capital murder
- Penalty: Death (April 26, 1982)

The execution of Frederick Lashley (March 10, 1964 – July 28, 1993) was carried out on July 28, 1993, at the Potosi Correctional Center in Missouri. Twelve years prior to his execution, on April 9, 1981, Lashley, who was then 17 years and one month old, murdered his 55-year-old ailing foster mother Janie Tracy (who was also his cousin) by battering her with a cast iron skillet and stabbing her in the head. Lashley was found guilty of capital murder and sentenced to death on April 26, 1982, thus becoming the youngest person in Missouri to be sentenced to death.

The conviction and death sentence of Lashley garnered significant attention, mainly due to the fact that he was 17 at the time of the murder. His lawyers argued that he should not be executed for killing his foster mother, mainly due to his young age and that he committed the crime while allegedly under the influence of drugs. Additionally, the arising concerns about the fairness of the trial procedures and evidence of his troubled childhood and lack of adult criminal records were cited among the various reasons to oppose his execution.

Despite the efforts of his lawyers and death penalty opponents to fight his death sentence, 29-year-old Lashley was ultimately executed by lethal injection on July 28, 1993, therefore becoming Missouri's first and only criminal to be executed for crimes committed as a juvenile in the United States, after the nation resumed capital punishment in 1976 before it eventually banned the death penalty for juvenile offenders in 2005.

== Background ==
Frederick Lashley was born on March 10, 1964, in the U.S. state of Missouri. Lashley, who was born to very young parents, was abandoned by his mother at an early age. He was raised by other relatives until the age of 15, during which time he experienced a turbulent and unstable upbringing. Between the ages of eight and 12, Lashley intermittently lived with his father, where he was routinely subjected to physical abuse. These years were marked by severe emotional distress — he became deeply depressed and began receiving psychiatric treatment.

By age ten, Lashley was drinking heavily, and by 11, he was seeing a psychologist weekly and reportedly experiencing frequent thoughts of suicide. Between the ages of 13 and 16, Lashley had several run-ins with the law for juvenile offences, and at 15, Lashley entered juvenile institutions, eventually moving in with a foster family shortly before turning 17. By the time of the crime, he was homeless and living on the streets. Despite his difficulties in life, Lashley completed the 12th grade in school and was considered average in intelligence.

== Murder of Janie Tracy ==
On April 9, 1981, a month after celebrating his 17th birthday, Frederick Lashley committed the murder of his birth cousin and foster mother in her apartment in St. Louis, Missouri.

The victim was 55-year-old Janie Tracy, who was the main caretaker of Lashley since he was two years old, until the time when Lashley was 16, Tracy asked Lashley to leave due to him getting into trouble with the authorities. Aside from this, Tracy suffered from several health issues, including heart disease, diabetes, and a neuromuscular disorder, and also had difficulty walking. Additionally, Tracy also underwent a brain operation several years before her death. The operation itself led to the removal of a portion of Tracy's skull on the left side of her head.

On the night of April 9, 1981, after visiting her sister, Tracy went back to her apartment in St. Louis, and prior to her return, Lashley broke into Tracy's apartment by climbing through a window. He unscrewed a light bulb in the front room to ensure darkness, intending to ambush her. When Tracy returned home, she attempted to turn on the light. As she entered the room, Lashley struck her over the head with a cast-iron skillet, breaking it into two pieces. She fell and screamed, and Lashley put his hand over her mouth. A struggle ensued, and Lashley then plunged a butcher knife into a known soft spot on her skull, located above her left ear, and the wound was so deep that it penetrated her brain.

After he mortally wounded his foster mother, Lashley stole Tracy's car keys and $15 from her purse, and fled in her car. Tracy died two days later from the stab wound to her brain. Lashley was apprehended shortly after midnight while driving the stolen vehicle and immediately confessed to the crime in both written and videotaped statements.

== Trial and sentencing ==
After his arrest, Frederick Lashley was charged with burglary, robbery, first-degree assault and capital murder. Less than a year later, in January 1982, a St. Louis Circuit Court jury found Lashley guilty of robbing and murdering Janie Tracy. On January 29, 1982, the jury unanimously recommended the death penalty for Lashley. Reportedly, before the trial verdict, Lashley put up a defense that he was under the heavy influence of drugs at the time of the offence.

On April 26, 1982, 18-year-old Frederick Lashley was formally sentenced to death by St. Louis Circuit Judge Michael F. Godfrey, therefore becoming the youngest inmate on Missouri's death row. During sentencing, Judge Godfrey remarked that the murder of Janie Tracy was "unbelievably cruel" and "incredibly heinous", as Lashley had ruthlessly murdered the same person who raised him as a child in cold blood, and yet he expressed that he wished to have "the power to turn back the clock" as he found it "agonizing" for him to condemn a convict as young as Lashley to death row, but emphasized it was the law he sided with in his decision. After his sentencing, Lashley was transferred to the Potosi Correctional Center, where he officially began his detention on death row.

At the time of Lashley's conviction in 1982, the death penalty was still legal for juveniles who committed capital crimes before turning 18, a practice permitted by Missouri and several other states at the time. As Lashley was 17 years and one month old when he murdered Janie Tracy, he was consequently eligible for execution. However, 23 years after his conviction, the U.S. Supreme Court's landmark 2005 decision in Roper v. Simmons declared the execution of juvenile offenders unconstitutional, thereby ending the practice nationwide. The appropriateness of capital punishment in juvenile cases was a subject of intense debate, particularly highlighted by Lashley's death sentence and the broader practice of sentencing individuals to death for crimes committed before the age of 18 in the United States.

As of 1986 and 1987, Lashley was one of two juveniles to be incarcerated on death row in Missouri. There were a total of 34 juvenile death row inmates imprisoned in the United States by 1987. Apart from Lashley, the other juvenile on Missouri's death row was Heath Wilkins, who was condemned to death row after pleading guilty to the 1985 murder of Nancy Allen, a crime which he committed at age 16. Although Wilkins's appeal led to the U.S. Supreme Court upholding the constitutionality of the death penalty in 1989, his death sentence was overturned upon another appeal, and Wilkins was ultimately re-sentenced to life imprisonment in May 1999 after pleading guilty to reduced charges of second-degree murder.

== Appeals ==
On March 20, 1984, the Missouri Supreme Court dismissed the direct appeal of Frederick Lashley against his conviction and sentence.

On September 30, 1984, the U.S. Supreme Court denied the appeal of Lashley by the majority vote of 7–2.

In 1989, while Lashley was still incarcerated on death row, the U.S. Supreme Court heard the appeal of another Missouri juvenile death row inmate, Heath Wilkins, who challenged the constitutionality of death sentences for youths aged below 18 when they committed crimes that attracted the death penalty. The U.S. Supreme Court ruled at the end of the appeal hearing that it was constitutional to execute juveniles who committed capital crimes while they were 16 or 17 years old, and therefore rejected Wilkins's appeal, upholding his death sentence; a similar ruling was also issued in a Kentucky juvenile death penalty case. Although Lashley was not involved in the appeal, the landmark decision effectively led to Lashley's death sentence being maintained by the courts.

On March 4, 1992, the 8th Circuit Court of Appeals allowed Lashley's federal appeal and vacated Lashley's death sentence and further ordered that his case be remitted back to the state courts for re-sentencing, after they found that there were procedural errors by the trial court, specifically the trial judge's refusal to instruct the jury on the mitigating circumstance that Lashley lacked a prior criminal record, despite no evidence of previous convictions.

On March 8, 1993, the U.S. Supreme Court overturned the verdict of the 8th Circuit Court of Appeals, and restored the death sentence of Lashley. In an unsigned majority opinion, the court stated that the death sentence was rightfully imposed in Lashley's case and the jury in his case did not need to be informed that Lashley had no prior adult criminal record, especially since there was no supporting evidence to require any instructions from the judge on any mitigation plea of the defendant. The U.S. Supreme Court also took into consideration that despite not having any adult criminal records, Lashley had also confessed to seven other crimes committed before the murder, including burglary, robbery, and theft, and had a juvenile record.

== Execution ==
Within four months after the U.S. Supreme Court finalized the death sentence of Frederick Lashley, his execution was scheduled to take place on July 28, 1993.

Throughout the final days leading up to Lashley's scheduled execution, there were pleas mounted for his life to be spared. Lashley's lawyers argued that Lashley's young age of 17 at the time of the murder should preclude him from the possibility of execution, and that he had killed his foster mother while under a high influence of drugs. Representatives of Amnesty International, the international human rights organization, also expressed concerns over the fairness of Lashley's trial, after it came to light that Lashley, who was of African-American descent, was convicted and sentenced to death by an all-White jury, and procedural errors committed during his trial process. The group also sought mercy from the Missouri authorities to commute Lashley's death sentence, citing his young age and the evidence of his troubled childhood as humanitarian grounds for clemency.

On July 28, 1993, 29-year-old Frederick Lashley was put to death by lethal injection at the Potosi Correctional Center. Lashley was the tenth offender executed in Missouri since the state's resumption of executions in 1989. Prior to his execution, Lashley filed an appeal to the U.S. Supreme Court as a final recourse to escape execution, but the appeal was rejected hours before the execution were to proceed. George Lombardi, a corrections official, revealed in a statement that Lashley bore no grudges against the executioner(s) involved in his execution.

The last juvenile offender executed in Missouri before Lashley was 19-year-old Lawrence Mabry, who was hanged in 1930 for the 1928 murder of law student William Bush, a crime he committed four days before his 18th birthday. Lashley's execution marked the first juvenile execution in Missouri in more than 60 years, as well as the first after the 1976 reinstatement of capital punishment in the United States. According to Amnesty International, Lashley was one of four juvenile offenders executed in the United States in 1993. The other three were executed in Texas (Curtis Harris and Ruben Cantu) and Georgia (Christopher Allen Burger).

In the aftermath, Lashley remained the only juvenile offender to be executed in Missouri since 1976. Twelve years after Lashley's execution, in 2005, the U.S. Supreme Court issued a landmark verdict in Roper v. Simmons, ruling that it was unconstitutional to execute individuals for crimes committed while under the age of 18, and therefore abolishing the death penalty for juveniles.

== See also ==
- Capital punishment in Missouri
- List of people executed in Missouri
- List of people executed in the United States in 1993
- Capital punishment for juveniles in the United States

Executions carried out in Missouri
Preceded by Walter Junior Blair July 21, 1993	Frederick Lashley; July 28, 1993	Succeeded by Frank Guinan October 6, 1993
Executions carried out in the United States
Preceded by Walter Junior Blair – Missouri July 21, 1993	Frederick Lashley – Missouri; July 28, 1993	Succeeded by Danny Harris – Texas July 30, 1993
