= Voxel-Man =

Digital models of the human body

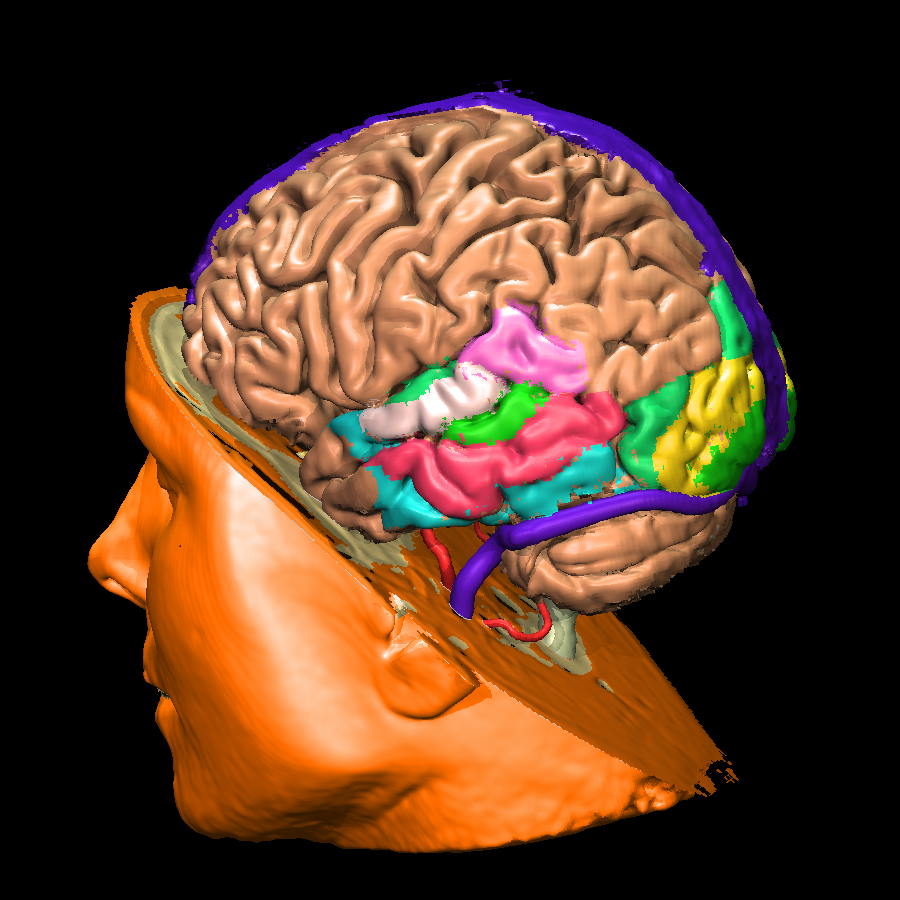
Brain rendered with VOXEL-MAN from magnetic resonance imaging data 1998

VOXEL-MAN is the name of a set of computer programs for creation and visualization of three-dimensional digital models of the human body derived from cross-sectional images of computer tomography, magnetic resonance tomography or photography (e. g. the Visible Human Project). It was developed at the University Medical Center Hamburg-Eppendorf. Applications include diagnostic imaging, digital anatomical atlases and surgery simulators. The 3D interactive atlases of anatomy and radiology for brain/skull (published 1998), inner organs (published 2000) and upper limb (published 2008) are available for free download. The name Voxel-Man is derived from the term voxel, the elementary cuboid component of a digital representation of a three-dimensional object ( a "three dimensional pixel"). Occasionally the name Voxel-Man is also used as a general term for a digital representation of the human body.
