= Certified Tissue Bank Specialist =

A Certified Tissue Bank Specialist (CTBS) designation is a professional certification mark for Tissue Banking Professionals conferred by the American Association of Tissue Banks (AATB). AATB oversees musculoskeletal, cardiovascular, skin and reproductive tissue banks in the United States.

To receive authorization to use the designation, the candidate must meet education, examination, experience and ethics requirements, and pay an ongoing certification fee.

Certification as a Tissue Bank Specialist requires Tissue Banking staff to be familiar with the Standards published by AATB, as well as the FDA promulgated standards of CFR 21, parts 1270 and 1271, and Guidance for Current Good Tissue Practice. The candidate must achieve a passing grade on an exam administered by AATB, which is currently a 72% (87/120 questions). An additional 10 questions may appear on the exam and are for research purposes only.

Certification as CTBS lasts for a cycle of three years, during which an individual must accrue 40 CEUs in relevant specialties to retain certification.
