= List of people executed in the United States in 1993 =

Thirty-eight people, all male, were executed in the United States in 1993, twenty-six by lethal injection, ten by electrocution, one by gas chamber and one by hanging. Two men, Carlos Santana and Ramon Montoya were foreign nationals. Westley Allan Dodd was one of three people between 1993-1996 to be hanged since 1965. Texas saw the highest executions in 1993.

== List of people executed in the United States in 1993 ==
No.	Date of execution	Name	Age of person			Gender	Ethnicity	State	Method	Ref.
No.	Date of execution	Name	At execution	At offense	Age difference	Gender	Ethnicity	State	Method	Ref.
1	January 5, 1993	Westley Allan Dodd	31	28	3	Male	White	Washington	Hanging	
2	January 19, 1993	Charles Sylvester Stamper	40	25	15	Male	Black	Virginia	Electrocution	
3	January 27, 1993	Martsay Luther Bolder	35	21	15	Male	Black	Missouri	Lethal injection	
4	March 3, 1993	John George Brewer	27	21	6	Male	White	Arizona	Lethal injection	
5	March 3, 1993	James Allen Red Dog	39	37	2	Male	Native American	Delaware	Lethal injection	
6	March 5, 1993	Robert Wayne Sawyer	41	28	13	Male	White	Louisiana	Lethal injection	
7	March 18, 1993	Syvasky Lafayette Poyner	36	27	9	Male	Black	Virginia	Electrocution	
8	March 23, 1993	Carlos Santana	40	28	12	Male	Hispanic	Texas	Lethal injection	
9	March 25, 1993	Ramon Montoya Facundo	38	29	9	Male	Hispanic	Texas	Lethal injection	
10	April 14, 1993	James Dean Clark	35	20	15	Male	White	Arizona	Lethal injection	
11	April 21, 1993	Robert Dale Henderson	48	36	12	Male	White	Florida	Electrocution	
12	May 4, 1993	Darryl Elroy Stewart	38	24	14	Male	Black	Texas	Lethal injection	
13	May 8, 1993	Larry Joe Johnson	49	35	14	Male	White	Florida	Electrocution	
14	May 12, 1993	Leonel Torres Herrera	45	34	11	Male	Hispanic	Texas	Lethal injection	
15	May 18, 1993	John Christopher Sawyers	37	27	11	Male	White	Texas	Lethal injection	
16	June 17, 1993	Andrew John Chabrol	36	34	2	Male	White	Virginia	Electrocution	
17	June 28, 1993	Thomas Dean Stevens	36	20	16	Male	White	Georgia	Electrocution	
18	June 29, 1993	Markham Duff-Smith	46	28	18	Male	White	Texas	Lethal injection	
19	July 1, 1993	Curtis Paul Harris	31	17	14	Male	Black	Texas	Lethal injection	
20	July 21, 1993	Walter Junior Blair	32	18	14	Male	Black	Missouri	Lethal injection	
21	July 28, 1993	Frederick Lashley	29	17	12	Male	Black	Missouri	Lethal injection	
22	July 30, 1993	Danny Ray Harris	32	18	14	Male	Black	Texas	Lethal injection	
23	August 5, 1993	Joseph Paul Jernigan	39	27	12	Male	White	Texas	Lethal injection	
24	August 12, 1993	David Lee Holland Sr.	58	50	8	Male	White	Texas	Lethal injection	
25	August 20, 1993	Carl Eugene Kelly	34	21	13	Male	Black	Texas	Lethal injection	
26	August 24, 1993	Ruben Montoya Cantu	26	17	9	Male	Hispanic	Texas	Lethal injection	
27	August 24, 1993	David Edwin Mason	36	23	13	Male	White	California	Gas chamber	
28	August 25, 1993	Michael Alan Durocher	33	23	10	Male	White	Florida	Electrocution	
29	August 31, 1993	Richard James Wilkerson	29	19	10	Male	Black	Texas	Lethal injection	
30	August 31, 1993	Kenneth Wesley DeShields	33	24	9	Male	Black	Delaware	Lethal injection	
31	September 3, 1993	Johnny James	39	31	8	Male	White	Texas	Lethal injection	
32	September 14, 1993	Joe Louis Wise Sr.	31	29	2	Male	Black	Virginia	Electrocution	
33	September 28, 1993	Antonio Nathaniel Bonham	33	21	12	Male	Black	Texas	Lethal injection	
34	October 6, 1993	Frank Joseph Guinan	47	35	12	Male	White	Missouri	Lethal injection	
35	November 10, 1993	Anthony Quinn Cook	34	29	5	Male	White	Texas	Lethal injection	
36	December 7, 1993	Christopher Allen Burger	33	17	16	Male	White	Georgia	Electrocution	
37	December 15, 1993	Clifford X. Phillips	59	47	12	Male	Black	Texas	Lethal injection	
38	December 16, 1993	David Mark Pruett	44	35	9	Male	White	Virginia	Electrocution	
		Average:	38 years	27 years	11 years					

== Demographics ==
Gender
Male	38	100%
Female	0	0%
Ethnicity
White	19	50%
Black	14	37%
Hispanic	4	11%
Native American	1	3%
State
Texas	17	45%
Virginia	5	13%
Missouri	4	11%
Florida	3	8%
Arizona	2	11%
Delaware	2	5%
Georgia	2	5%
California	1	3%
Louisiana	1	3%
Washington	1	3%
Method
Lethal injection	26	68%
Electrocution	10	26%
Gas chamber	1	3%
Hanging	1	3%
Month
January	3	8%
February	0	0%
March	6	16%
April	2	5%
May	4	11%
June	3	8%
July	4	11%
August	8	21%
September	3	8%
October	1	3%
November	1	3%
December	3	8%
Age
20–29	4	11%
30–39	24	63%
40–49	8	21%
50–59	2	5%
Total	38	100%

== Executions in recent years ==
Number of executions
1994	31
1993	38
1992	31
Total	100

Preceded by 1992	List of people executed in the United States in 1993	Succeeded by 1994
