= American Association of Tissue Banks =

The Association for Advancing Tissue and Biologics (AATB) is a nonprofit transplant trade organization that is dedicated to ensuring that human tissues intended for transplantation are safe and free of infectious disease, of uniform high quality, and available in quantities sufficient to meet national needs. AATB is located in McLean, Virginia. It was founded in 1976 as the American Association of Tissue Banks and consists of 1,100 members. In 2025, the organization changed its name to the Association for Advancing Tissue and Biologics.

The AATB provides accreditation for over 100 tissue banks. According to their website, AATB is a voluntary association of organizations committed to obtaining tissues for allografts (transplant) and providing the general public and the medical community with the safest products possible. The program is not regulatory in nature, but educational.

The AATB also accommodates accreditation to non-transplant tissue banks and whole body donation programs.

To avoid violating the Health Insurance Portability and Accountability Act, AATB must through their legal anatomical authorizations obtain consent which allows AATB representatives access to donor information for accreditation reviews.

The AATB recovered around 17,000 donor grafts in 1996, and in 23,000, this number increased to about 23,000 donor grafts and around 1.3 million musculoskeletal grafts were distributed.

== See also ==
- Certified Tissue Bank Specialist
