= Susan Potter =

German cancer survivor, disability rights activist and body donor (1927–2015)

- Born: Susan Christina Witschel; December 25, 1927; Leipzig, Saxony, Germany
- Died: February 16, 2015 (aged 87); Denver, Colorado, United States
- Occupation: Activist

Susan Christina Potter (born Witschel; 25 December 1927 – 16 February 2015) was a cancer survivor, a disability rights activist and a body donor for the Visible Human Project. During the 15 years between signing on to the project in 2000 and her death by pneumonia in 2015 at the age of 87, Potter became a public figure and an outspoken advocate for medical education, mentoring medical students at the University of Colorado.

For nearly two decades, National Geographic documented the story of Susan Potter and Dr. Victor M. Spitzer, the director of the Center for Human Simulation at the University of Colorado Anschutz Medical Campus who led the NIH-funded project, releasing a video documentary in 2018. By the time Potter met Spitzer in 2000, she had gone through 26 surgeries and had been diagnosed with melanoma, breast cancer and diabetes: her participation in the Visible Human Project marked a significant departure from the original goals of the project, which up until then had only focused on the dissection and imaging of healthy bodies. When in the early 2000s, the National Geographic magazine started covering her story, Potter had been in a major car accident, used a wheelchair, and was expected to die within a year. Instead, her life continued for another 14 years, during which she developed a friendship with Dr. Spitzer.

After her death in 2015, Potter's body was frozen solid at −15 °F (−26 °C), cut in four sections on March 9, 2017 and subsequently sliced into 27,000 slices in 63-μm increments, individually scanned during a period of 60 working days. Because the technology used in the Visible Human project significantly improved since its launch in 1993, much more detail will be available in Potter's scans: images from the two previous donors were based on 1,000 μm sections for the male subject and 300 μm for the female subject.
