= Joseph Paul Jernigan =

American murderer (1954–1993)

- Born: January 31, 1954; Geneva, Illinois, U.S.
- Died: August 5, 1993 (aged 39); Huntsville Unit, Texas, U.S.
- Status: Executed by lethal injection
- Conviction: Capital murder
- Penalty: Death

Joseph Paul Jernigan (January 31, 1954 – August 5, 1993) was a Texas murderer who was executed by lethal injection on August 5, 1993 at 12:31 a.m.

In 1981, Jernigan was found guilty of "cold-blooded murder" and sentenced to death for killing Edward Hale, a 75-year-old homeowner who discovered Jernigan and his accomplice, Roy Lamb, as they were burglarizing his home.

Jernigan spent 12 years in prison before his final plea for clemency was denied. At the prompting of a prison chaplain, he agreed to donate his body for scientific research or medical use. After execution, his cadaver was sectioned and photographed for the Visible Human Project and the University of Colorado School of Medicine by Dr. Victor M. Spitzer. He is the subject of an HBO documentary Virtual Corpse and also appeared on the British video game TV series GamesMaster's gore special.

Jernigan had no last words.

Lamb pleaded guilty to murder, received a 30-year sentence, and was paroled in 1991.

== See also ==
- List of people executed in Texas, 1990–1999
- List of people executed in the United States in 1993
