= Murder of Roger Honeycutt =

1977 kidnapping and murder of a soldier in Georgia, U.S.

- Date: September 4, 1977
- Location: Wayne County, Georgia, U.S.
- Type: Robbery, kidnapping, sexual assault and murder
- Deaths: Roger Honeycutt, 25
- Convicted: Christopher Allen Burger; Thomas Dean Stevens
- Verdict: Guilty
- Convictions: Murder
- Sentence: Death (January 1978)

On September 4, 1977, in Wayne County, Georgia, 25-year-old Fort Stewart soldier Roger Honeycutt (1952 – September 4, 1977), who was moonlighting as a taxi driver, was kidnapped by two fellow soldiers, Thomas Dean Stevens (1957 – June 28, 1993) and Christopher Allen Burger (December 30, 1959 – December 7, 1993), who robbed and sexually assaulted Honeycutt before they drowned him. The two murderers were caught for the crime after a friend of theirs got wind of their involvement and filed a report to the police. In January 1978, both Stevens and Burger were found guilty and sentenced to death.

Stevens was executed by the electric chair at the age of 36 on June 28, 1993, while Burger, who was 17 at the time of the offense, was similarly executed by electrocution five months later on December 7, 1993, in spite of widespread efforts to seek clemency for Burger, who became one of the few offenders to be executed for crimes committed as a juvenile in the United States.

== Abduction and murder ==
On September 4, 1977, a soldier and part-time taxi driver was kidnapped, robbed and murdered by two passengers in Wayne County, Georgia.

25-year-old Fort Stewart soldier Roger Honeycutt, who moonlighted as a taxi driver to earn additional income, picked up two passengers, 17-year-old Christopher Allen Burger and 20-year-old Thomas Dean Stevens, who were also soldiers like Honeycutt. In reality, Burger and Stevens were out of money after drinking beer at a club in their military base and planned to commit robbery, while at the same time, they received a phone call from a friend, who asked them to fetch him at a Savannah airport. Upon entering the taxi of Honeycutt, Burger and Stevens threatened him with a butcher knife and a sharpening tool, which they stole from the military base's mess hall. After robbing Honeycutt of $16, they forcibly performed both sodomy and oral sex on Honeycutt, who was subsequently tied up and locked in the trunk of the vehicle.

Afterwards, the pair drove Honeycutt's taxi and fetched their friend and squad leader, James Robert Botsford, and during the trip itself, the duo informed Botsford about the robbery and sexual assault of Honeycutt, and the pair also repeatedly called out to Honeycutt throughout the journey, to which Honeycutt responded from the trunk. At one point, Stevens proclaimed that Honeycutt should be killed, and Botsford reportedly tried to dissuade the two men from committing murder. Subsequently, the two perpetrators dropped Botsford off at Fort Stewart.

Although Burger and Stevens agreed to Botsford's request to spare Honeycutt's life, they did not release Honeycutt as they promised, and instead, they drove to a secluded pond. After removing a CB radio from the vehicle and wiping their fingerprints, they drove the cab into the water, leaving Honeycutt to drown inside the trunk.

== Trials of Stevens and Burger ==
=== Arrest and charges ===
The murder was revealed a few days later. Botsford, who had not believed that the pair had released Honeycutt (as they lied to him when inquiring whether he had reported to the authorities) saw a news report about Honeycutt's disappearance and reported the matter to the police leading to the arrest of his murderers.

After their arrest on September 12, 1977, Thomas Stevens and Christopher Burger confessed to the crime, and as a result, both men were charged with murdering Honeycutt, whose body was recovered by the police from the pit. Under Georgia state law, the death penalty was legalized as the maximum punishment for murder.

=== Court proceedings ===
Christopher Burger

After they were formally indicted in December 1977, Christopher Burger was the first out of the duo to stand trial for the killing of Honeycutt.

On January 24, 1978, a Wayne County jury found Burger guilty of murdering Honeycutt. A day later, Burger was sentenced to death by the trial court upon the jury's unanimous recommendation for capital punishment.

At the time of Christopher Burger's conviction in 1978, the death penalty was still legally applicable to juveniles who committed capital crimes while under the age of 18, in accordance with Georgia law and that of several other states that permitted the execution of juvenile offenders. Since Burger was 17 when he murdered Roger Honeycutt, he was eligible to be executed. 27 years after Burger's conviction, the U.S. Supreme Court's landmark 2005 decision in Roper v. Simmons ruled that executing individuals for crimes committed while under 18 was unconstitutional, effectively banning the juvenile death penalty nationwide.

As of 1986 and 1987, Burger was one of four juveniles to be incarcerated on death row in Georgia. There were a total of 34 juvenile death row inmates imprisoned in the United States by 1987.

Thomas Stevens

A day after Burger was condemned to death row, Thomas Stevens went on trial for his part in the murder of Honeycutt.

On January 26, 1978, the first day of Stevens's trial, the jury swiftly found Stevens guilty and convicted him of murder. Furthermore, the same jury also recommended the death penalty for Stevens, who was thus sentenced to death by the Wayne County Superior Court.

== Appellate process ==
=== Appeals of Stevens ===
On September 5, 1978, Thomas Stevens's direct appeal was heard by the Georgia Supreme Court, and in the end, the court upheld the murder conviction of Stevens, but remitted his case back to the lower courts for re-sentencing after they overturned his death sentence.

A re-trial was conducted, and it ended with Stevens being sentenced to death a second time by a different jury. Stevens appealed a second time to the Georgia Supreme Court, but it was rejected on April 9, 1980.

On October 6, 1980, Stevens's appeal was turned down by the U.S. Supreme Court.

On March 14, 1985, a third appeal lodged by Stevens to the Georgia Supreme Court was also denied.

On July 31, 1992, Stevens's appeal was dismissed by the 11th Circuit Court of Appeals.

=== Appeals of Burger ===
On September 5, 1978, Burger's direct appeal was allowed by the Georgia Supreme Court, which upheld his conviction but reversed his death sentence in favour of a re-sentencing trial.

Following a re-trial, Burger was re-sentenced to death by a different jury. On March 14, 1980, the Georgia Supreme Court received a second appeal from Burger against his death sentence, and in the end, the appeal was denied.

On June 2, 1980, the U.S. Supreme Court dismissed Burger's appeal against his death sentence.

On October 13, 1983, the 11th Circuit Court of Appeals allowed the prosecution's appeal and reversed a lower court's prior decision to set aside Burger's death sentence.

Originally, Burger was scheduled to be executed on March 27, 1984, for the murder of Honeycutt, but on the eve of the execution, the U.S. Supreme Court issued a stay of execution, and in May 1984, the death sentence was once again temporarily vacated and the U.S. Supreme Court directed the 11th Circuit Court of Appeals to re-hear the case.

On February 5, 1985, the 11th Circuit Court of Appeals lifted the execution stay and rejected the appeal of Burger, reinstating his death sentence. A new execution date was fixed on September 9, 1985, but three days before it was supposed to occur, the execution was postponed by the U.S. Supreme Court due to another legal issue. In October 1985, the U.S. Supreme Court reversed both the conviction and sentence of Burger and directed the 11th Circuit Court of Appeals to conduct another review of the case.

On March 13, 1986, the 11th Circuit Court of Appeals dismissed Burger's appeal and restored his murder conviction and death sentence. A follow-up appeal was then lodged to the U.S. Supreme Court in November 1986.

On June 26, 1987, the U.S. Supreme Court turned down another appeal from Burger. A new death warrant was issued and scheduled Burger to be executed sometime between October 21 and October 28, 1987, but the execution date was staved off due to the Georgia Supreme Court intending to deliberate whether it was appropriate to execute offenders who were below 18 at the time of their crimes.

Three years later, a fifth death warrant was issued, re-scheduling Burger's death sentence to be carried out on December 18, 1990. However, on the eve of Burger's scheduled execution, another stay of execution was granted by the 11th Circuit Court of Appeals. At that time, the case of Burger gained the attention of international human rights group Amnesty International, and the group argued that Burger had a tragic and troubled childhood marred by abuse from his mother's boyfriends and husbands, and the neglect of his severely mentally-ill mother, which likely caused brain damage due to trauma to the central nervous system. On top of that, they argued that Burger was 17 when he killed Honeycutt and thus his life should be spared.

On February 12, 1993, the 11th Circuit Court of Appeals once again dismissed Burger's fourth appeal.

== Execution of Stevens ==
About 16 years after the murder of Roger Honeycutt, one of his killers, Thomas Stevens, was notified of his death warrant, scheduling his execution date on June 28, 1993.

On June 27, 1993, the eve of Stevens's execution, the Georgia Supreme Court dismissed his appeal and the Georgia State Board of Pardons and Paroles similarly denied clemency for Stevens. On June 28, 1993, just hours before the execution was taking place, Stevens's lawyers filed two last appeals to the U.S. Supreme Court to delay the execution, arguing that their client was intellectually disabled and was convicted with perjured testimony, but the court unanimously denied both appeals.

About 25 minutes after the U.S. Supreme Court refused his appeal, 36-year-old Thomas Dean Stevens was put to death by the electric chair at the Georgia Diagnostic and Classification State Prison; his official time of death was 11:15pm. Just hours after Stevens's execution, on June 29, 1993, 46-year-old Markham Duff-Smith was executed in Texas by lethal injection for the murder of his adoptive mother.

Prior to his execution, Stevens did not make a special last meal request, but he agreed to receive the regular prison meal set of spaghetti with meat sauce, green beans, rolls, peach cobbler and iced tea. Stevens also received a final prison visit from his nephew and half-sister and lawyer, and spent the final hours of his life watching television; prison officers noted that Stevens looked calm during the afternoon before he was executed.

== Execution of Burger ==
Five months after the execution of Stevens, his co-defendant, Christopher Burger, was scheduled to be executed on December 7, 1993.

During the final days leading up to Burger's scheduled execution, several human rights groups banded together to appeal for clemency on behalf of Burger. They argued that Burger was only 17 when he killed Honeycutt and his young age, in addition to his past experiences as a victim of child abuse, should warrant a commutation of his death sentence to life imprisonment. Additionally, Burger filed last-minute court appeals to delay his execution, but both a Superior Court judge in Jackson and the Georgia Supreme Court dismissed the appeals, while the state parole board also voted against clemency for Burger. A final appeal was then lodged to the U.S. Supreme Court on December 7, 1993, which delayed the execution for nearly three hours that night, but the appeal was ultimately rejected.

About an hour after the U.S. Supreme Court denied a stay, 33-year-old Christopher Allen Burger was put to death by the electric chair at the Georgia Diagnostic and Classification State Prison, and the official time of death was 9:51pm. For his last meal, Burger requested both water and unleavened bread. Allen Ault, a psychologist and warden of the prison itself, revealed in a 2014 interview that he oversaw Burger's execution, and he clearly remembered that Burger was remorseful for his actions, especially after he gained maturity and received education during his 17-year stay on death row. Ault regarded the execution of Burger as the "most troubling" case he witnessed given the fact that Burger was merely 17 at the time of the offense and suffered from borderline mental impairments.

Burger was the first offender to be executed in Georgia for crimes committed as a juvenile, after the state last conducted a juvenile's execution in 1957. According to Amnesty International, Burger was one of four offenders executed in the United States during the year of 1993 for separate homicides they committed as a minor; the other three were executed in Texas (Curtis Harris and Ruben Cantu) and Missouri (Frederick Lashley).

== Aftermath ==
Since the reinstatement of capital punishment in the United States in 1976, Christopher Burger remains the only individual executed in Georgia for a crime committed as a juvenile. His execution occurred prior to the U.S. Supreme Court's 2005 Roper v. Simmons decision, which banned the death penalty for offenders under the age of 18 at the time of their crime. Between 1976 and 2005, a total of 22 juvenile offenders on death row, including Burger, were executed.

One other juvenile offender, Alexander Williams, was scheduled for execution on February 25, 2002. However, Williams's death sentence was commuted to life in prison without parole by Georgia State Board of Pardons and Paroles due to his age at the time of the murder, mental illness, and mentally retardation. Williams hanged himself in prison on November 25, 2002.

The murder of Roger Honeycutt remained as one of the most infamous murders to happen in the state of Georgia, and both Thomas Stevens and Christopher Burger were listed among the most notorious criminals who have committed crimes in the state itself.

== See also ==
- Capital punishment in Georgia (U.S. state)
- List of people executed in Georgia (U.S. state)
- List of people executed in the United States in 1993
- Capital punishment for juveniles in the United States

Executions carried out in Georgia (U.S. state)
Preceded by Warren McCleskey September 25, 1991	Thomas Dean Stevens; June 28, 1993	Succeeded by Christopher Allen Burger December 7, 1993
Executions carried out in the United States
Preceded by Andrew John Chabrol – Virginia June 17, 1993	Thomas Dean Stevens – Georgia; June 28, 1993	Succeeded by Markham Duff-Smith – Texas June 29, 1993
Executions carried out in Georgia (U.S. state)
Preceded by Thomas Dean Stevens June 28, 1993	Christopher Allen Burger; December 7, 1993	Succeeded by William Henry Hance March 31, 1994
Executions carried out in the United States
Preceded by Anthony Quinn Cook – Texas November 10, 1993	Christopher Allen Burger – Georgia; December 7, 1993	Succeeded by Clifford X. Phillips – Texas December 15, 1993
