= Robert Dale Henderson =

American spree killer

- Undated photo of Robert Dale Henderson
- Born: March 14, 1945; Missouri, U.S.
- Died: April 21, 1993 (aged 48); Florida State Prison, Florida, U.S.
- Status: Executed by electrocution
- Conviction: First degree murder (5 counts)
- Penalty: Death

Details
- Victims: 12
- Span of crimes: January 14, 1982 – February 4, 1982
- Country: United States
- States: Ohio; South Carolina; Florida; Georgia; Mississippi; Louisiana
- Date apprehended: February 6, 1982

Robert Dale Henderson (March 14, 1945 – April 21, 1993) was an American spree killer who murdered 12 people over the span of three weeks.

== Early life ==
Henderson was born in Missouri, the son of Mary and Robert Henderson. At the age of fifteen, he lived in Park Hills, Missouri. The Henderson family then moved to Poplar Bluff, Missouri, after which his parents soon divorced. He attended Cane Creek High School in Missouri, dropping out in 1962. After dropping out, Henderson served in the United States Army. He had duties in Fort Polk South, Louisiana, followed by a stint in Korea.

Henderson was discharged on May 14, 1964, for attacking an officer. After being discharged, he worked numerous jobs. In the 1970s, Henderson's residence was raided as part of an investigation into a suspected marijuana ring. He also had stolen a driver's license in Brevard County, Florida. In 1977, Henderson committed a robbery in Laramie, Wyoming, for which he was sent to the Wyoming State Penitentiary in October 1978. He was later incarcerated in Robertson, Wyoming.

Henderson was released in July 1981, moving into the home of tobacco farmer Ivan Barnett, his new wife's father.

== Murders ==
On January 14, 1982, he kidnapped, raped, and murdered beautician Jerilyn Stanfield in Cincinnati, Ohio.

Henderson then murdered his in-laws, Ivan Barnett, his wife Marie, and their eleven-year-old son Clifford in Cherry Fork, Ohio on January 21, 1982. Three days later, he murdered receptionist Lucinda Lee Russell in Charleston, South Carolina. On January 25, 1982, he murdered physician Murray Ferderber and retail clerk Dorothy Wilkinson in Palatka, Florida. On the same date, Henderson raped a mother and a daughter in Valdosta, Georgia. Henderson then murdered Cheryl McDonald in Pascagoula, Mississippi on January 27, 1982.

Henderson murdered nightclub owner Sam Corrent in Port Allen, Louisiana on January 29, 1982. He then murdered hitchhikers Robert Dawson, Frances Bell Dickey, and Vernon D. Odom in Hernando County, Florida on February 4. After having killed the 12 victims, Henderson approached a sheriff's deputy at a shopping center in Punta Gorda, Florida on February 6, 1982, and voluntarily surrendered.

== Trial and execution ==
Despite his lawyers attempts to keep Henderson out of the electric chair, he was given three death sentences. Henderson's lawyers appealed once to the Supreme Court of the United States for a new trial, but the request was denied.

Henderson was executed by electric chair on April 21, 1993, at the Florida State Prison. He was pronounced dead at 7:10 a.m.

== See also ==
- Capital punishment in Florida
- Capital punishment in the United States
- List of people executed in Florida
- List of people executed in the United States in 1993
