= Terry Blair (serial killer) =

American serial killer (1961–2024)

- Born: Terry Anthony Blair; September 16, 1961; Kansas City, Missouri, U.S.
- Died: May 11, 2024 (aged 62); Potosi, Missouri, U.S.
- Relatives: Walter Blair Jr. (brother)
- Status: Deceased
- Convictions: Second degree murder (1982); Six counts of first degree murder (2008)
- Penalty: 25 years imprisonment (1982; paroled after 21 years); Six consecutive life sentences without the possibility of parole (2008)

Details
- Victims: 7+
- Span of crimes: 1982–2004
- Country: United States
- State: Missouri
- Date apprehended: September 14, 2004

Terry Anthony Blair (September 16, 1961 – May 11, 2024) was an American serial killer who was convicted of killing seven women of various ages in Kansas City, Missouri, although investigators believed that there were additional unidentified victims.

== Family history ==
Terry Blair was the fourth eldest of ten siblings, and was born to a mother who suffered from mental illness and had only finished the 9th grade. He had two sons and two grandsons.

Many in Blair's family have faced criminal charges, including murder.

Blair's mother, Janice, shot and killed her common-law husband on August 16, 1978. She entered an Alford plea for second degree murder and was sentenced to five years of probation, with a condition that she receive counseling, therapy, and psychiatric treatment.

Six months later, Blair's brother, Walter Blair Jr., allegedly killed 16-year-old Sandy Shannon during a robbery. Walter was charged with capital murder, robbery, and assault, but the case was dropped after witnesses refused to testify. On August 19, 1979, Walter Blair abducted, then shot and killed 21-year-old Katherine Jo Allen. Allen was the alleged victim in a rape case and Walter was paid $6,000 to kill her. He confessed to the murder, but later recanted. Walter was convicted of capital murder, sentenced to death, and executed on July 21, 1993, at the age of 32.

Blair's sister, Warnetta U. Blair, her husband, Noila White III, and another man faced charges for the murder of James L. Bell, whose body was found on September 27, 1980. Bell had been stabbed 30 times. Warnetta agreed to testify against her husband in exchange for charges against her being dropped. However, state law forbids spouses from testifying against each other. In 1984, White III pleaded guilty to second degree murder and received a 12-year sentence. White III would himself be murdered by his son and Blair's nephew, Noila White IV, in 2001. White IV pleaded guilty to second degree murder for killing his father and was sentenced to 30 years in prison.

In December 1989, Warnetta killed her boyfriend, Pablo P. Gomez, a drug dealer from Cuba. Gomez's body was found bound and gagged. According to prosecutors, Gomez had threatened to cut off his girlfriend's supply of crack cocaine. Warnetta said she and a male friend did not intend to kill Gomez, and only tied him up so they could take his drugs and money. She and her friend then went to a neighbor's apartment and said they had "messed up Pablo", before smoking crack that night. In August 1990, Warnetta pleaded guilty to second degree murder and received a 10-year sentence. She was released from prison in December 1999.

On June 25, 1992, Blair's older brother, Clifford Miller, abducted a woman, forced her to perform oral sex at an abandoned house, and then beat her unconscious. The victim was hospitalized for more than two months. Her injuries consisted of a gunshot wound to the arm, a fractured skull, a broken jaw, and smashed cheekbones. The injury to the victim's arm was so serious that she had to get a bone in her arm replaced with metal. In 1994, Clifford was convicted of forcible sodomy, assault, kidnapping, and armed criminal action. He was sentenced to two life terms plus 240 years.

In December 1999, another of Blair's brothers, Daniel, pleaded guilty to federal drug charges and was sentenced to eight years and four months in prison. He and another man had been dealing crack. Daniel was released from prison on January 19, 2007.

Two other nephews of Blair have faced criminal charges. In 2011, Diamond Blair, who had previously served part of an 18-year sentence for kidnapping, robbery, and forcible sodomy as a teenager, was convicted of federal firearm charges and sentenced to 24 years and five months in prison. In 2013, he was convicted of second degree murder, first degree robbery, and two counts of armed criminal action for killing 22-year-old Montague Kevin Ashline during a robbery in Kansas City on June 24, 2009. Diamond was sentenced to two life terms plus 100 years on those charges. On appeal, his robbery conviction and one of his armed criminal action convictions were overturned, reducing his state sentence to life plus 50 years. However, his other two convictions were upheld.

In December 1991, William Blair, then 16, received a 15-year sentence for first degree robbery. He was released from prison on September 28, 2003. William later faced 88 charges of robbery, assault, and armed criminal action for a series of violent armed robberies at bars and other businesses from December 3, 2003, to January 8, 2004. In some of the robberies, he and three other robbers would fire warning shots, kick, shove, pistol-whip, and threaten to kill employees and customers. On October 7, 2004, William pleaded guilty to 17 counts of first-degree robbery, 19 counts of armed criminal action, one count of attempted robbery, and one count of first degree assault. In exchange for his guilty plea, the other 50 charges were dropped.

== Crimes ==
=== 1982 murder of Angela Monroe ===
In 1982, Terry Blair was found guilty of killing Angela Monroe, the mother of two of Blair's children (and pregnant at the time). Blair was sentenced to 25 years imprisonment for this murder and was released on parole after serving 21 years. According to court records he was angry with Monroe for performing acts of prostitution.

=== 2003–2004 murders ===
Alerted by a strong odor, a neighbor noticed two women's bodies in the garage of an abandoned home and notified police on September 2, 2004. Late in the evening of September 3, an anonymous male caller contacted 911 dispatch to claim responsibility for killing the two victims discovered the day before, and notified police where to find an additional body hidden in an alley a few blocks away from the first two. The caller contacted 911 again on September 4 to reveal the location of two more victims in an overgrown area near a highway, and promised to call again. He stopped contacting dispatchers after a news station leaked information about how the caller was using a cell phone. Police found several additional murder victims, one of whom had earlier been erroneously classified as a drug overdose, and several women who reported rapes and assaults possibly linked to the murders. All the victims were found in a small radius near Prospect Avenue.

Investigation gradually narrowed down on Blair as a suspect. He was on parole for the 1982 murder of Monroe, and also matched the description given by women who claimed to have survived rapes and physical assaults. A witness claimed Blair had threatened to kill prostitutes. Investigators were not able to tie Blair directly to the cell phone used to make the 911 calls, as it had been stolen and subsequently used only to make emergency 911 calls, but cell tower data established that the calls originated near where he lived. Blair was initially arrested on a parole violation charge, having failed to stay in contact with a probation officer, and was later charged with the homicides.

On October 15, 2004, Terry Blair was charged with eight counts of first-degree murder, one count of first-degree assault, and three counts of forcible rape. Prosecutors agreed not to seek the death penalty in exchange for Blair waiving his right to a jury trial, and thus Judge John O'Malley oversaw the bench trial. Two of the murder charges (for Sandra Reed and Nellia Harris) were dropped. The rape and assault charges were also dropped.

Although the evidence was mainly circumstantial, Blair's DNA was found on victim Sheliah McKinzie. Blair's defense was that this item of evidence only proved he had engaged in sex with the victim. The prosecution countered that since she hadn't tidied herself up afterwards, Blair must have been the last to see her alive. Blair denied making the 911 calls, and the prosecution introduced linguistics testimony to confirm their assertion that Blair made the 911 calls. The judge ruled the weight of evidence indicated the voice was Blair's.

Judge O'Malley ruled Blair guilty on March 27, 2008, and he was sentenced to six life sentences with no possibility of parole for these six murders.

Because Blair continued to deny responsibility for the crimes until his death, his motive could not be understood beyond a compulsion to kill prostitutes.

Blair was housed in the Potosi Correctional Center in Mineral Point, Missouri.

Blair appealed his conviction, but his appeal was denied by the Missouri Court of Appeals in August 2009.

=== List of victims ===
Below is the list of victims Terry Blair was convicted of murdering:

- Angela Monroe
- Anna Ewing, 42, died on or before July 14, 2004.
- Patricia Wilson Butler, 58, died on or before September 2, 2004.
- Sheliah McKinzie, 38, died on or before September 2, 2004.
- Darci I. Williams, 25, died on or before September 4, 2004.
- Carmen Hunt, 40. September 4, 2004.
- Claudette Juniel, 31, died on or before September 4, 2004.

Blair was also accused in the murders of Sandra Reed and Nellia Harris, an additional assault, and three other rapes, but these charges were later dropped.

== Death ==
Blair died at a prison hospital in Potosi, Missouri, on May 11, 2024, at the age of 62.

== In media ==
Blair's crimes are featured in the episodes "A Serial Killer Calls" and "The Killer Speaks" of the television show The First 48.

== See also ==
- List of serial killers in the United States
