= Walter Blair Jr. =

Executed American murderer (1960–1993)

- Born: Walter J. Blair Jr. September 29, 1960; Kansas City, Missouri, U.S.
- Died: July 21, 1993 (aged 32); Potosi Correctional Center, Mineral Point, Missouri, U.S.
- Cause of death: Execution by lethal injection
- Other name: Walter Junior Blair
- Relatives: Terry Blair (brother)
- Conviction: Capital murder
- Penalty: Death (January 14, 1981)

Details
- Victims: Sandy L. Shannon, 16 (accused); Katherine Jo Allen, 21
- Date: August 19, 1979
- Country: United States
- State: Missouri
- Date apprehended: August 22, 1979

Walter Blair Jr. (September 29, 1960 – July 21, 1993), also known as Walter Junior Blair, was an American convicted murderer who was executed by the state of Missouri for the August 1979 murder of 21-year-old Katherine Jo Allen in Kansas City, Missouri. Blair was hired to murder Allen by Larry Jackson, who was accused of raping her, and wanted her dead to prevent her testimony. Blair was also accused of fatally shooting 16-year-old Sandy Shannon, however, the charges were ultimately dropped when witnesses refused to testify. Blair was executed in 1993 at the Potosi Correctional Center via lethal injection. At the time of his execution, he was Missouri's longest-serving death row inmate.

Walter Blair was the older brother of Terry Blair, a convicted serial killer who murdered at least seven women across Kansas City, Missouri.

== Early life ==
Walter Blair Jr. was born on September 29, 1960, and came from a violent family. He was one of ten siblings and grew up in poverty. His mother suffered from mental illness and went no further in school than ninth grade. She would later go on to kill her common-law husband, Elton E. Gray, in 1978. Many of Walter Blair's other family members would go on to commit crimes, with his younger brother, Terry Blair, ultimately being convicted of murdering seven women.

== Murder ==
On January 15, 1979, 16-year-old honor student Sandy L. Shannon was shot and killed. His body was found in a snowbank, and he had been killed by a shotgun blast to the back. Authorities arrested Blair for the crime, and he was held at the Jackson County Jail on charges of capital murder, robbery, and assault. Blair was held in jail between January 22 and July 16. However, witnesses refused to testify against him, so the charges were ultimately all dropped, with the murder charge being dropped on May 14, and the robbery and assault charges being dropped on June 27. Blair was then held on a reduced charge of carrying a concealed weapon. He was released from jail on July 16 on a $2,500 surety bond.

While in jail, Blair met Larry Jackson, who was in the adjoining cell to him. Jackson was being held in connection with the April 2, 1979, rape of 21-year-old Katherine Jo Allen, a student of the Kansas City Art Institute. Jackson did not want Allen to testify against him in his upcoming trial, so he hired Blair to kill her to prevent her testimony, agreeing to pay him $6,000 for doing so.

In the early morning hours of August 19, 1979, Blair abducted Allen from her apartment and drove her to a vacant lot. Allen then supposedly said to Blair that she did not want to die and grabbed hold of the handgun Blair was holding. The gun went off several times, and Allen was fatally shot during the struggle.

== Trial ==
=== Conviction ===
On the morning of August 22, 1979, Blair was arrested at an apartment. He was taken into custody and did not resist arrest. Once in custody, Blair gave a detailed confession of the crime to police that was also videotaped, in which he described how he abducted Allen from her apartment, took her to a vacant lot, and fatally shot her during a struggle when she reached for his gun. He also said he called Jackson the following day to tell him "the good news". Blair later recanted his confession and claimed he had been threatened to confess to the crime by the interviewing detective, who had supposedly promised him a deal if he testified against Jackson.

On October 16, 1980, he was found guilty of murdering Allen. The following day, the jury recommended he be sentenced to death. On January 14, 1981, he was formally sentenced to death. Jackson was never convicted of raping Allen but was sentenced to life in prison for an unrelated murder.

=== Appeal process ===
After Blair was condemned to death row, a direct appeal was filed to the Missouri Supreme Court, but it was dismissed on August 31, 1982.

On September 24, 1990, the 8th Circuit Court of Appeals denied Blair's appeal. A second appeal to the same appellate court was rejected on September 18, 1992.

== Execution ==
On July 13, 1993, Blair was scheduled for execution on July 21. In the days leading up to his execution, Jackson signed an affidavit saying he had hired another man, Ernest Jones, to murder Allen. Jones had been the main witness for the prosecution during Blair's trial. Six other affidavits were also filed by Blair's appeal lawyer from people claiming Jones had framed Blair for the murder, including Jones' brother and a former lover. The witnesses allegedly only came forward later because Jones was murdered in 1990. Blair had contended during his trial that Jones had been the one who had killed Allen. The prosecutor at Blair's trial countered this by saying Blair's seven-page confession in 1979 made it clear he was guilty. He also pointed out that Blair had told police where to find Allen's driver's license and burned checkbook, which were found hidden under a sewer near Blair's house.

On July 21, 1993, Blair was executed by lethal injection at the Potosi Correctional Center. He had no final statement and declined to order a last meal.

== See also ==
- Capital punishment in Missouri
- Capital punishment in the United States
- List of people executed in Missouri
- List of people executed in the United States in 1993

Executions carried out in Missouri
Preceded by Martsay Bolder January 27, 1993	Walter Junior Blair; July 21, 1993	Succeeded by Frederick Lashley July 28, 1993
Executions carried out in the United States
Preceded by Curtis Paul Harris – Texas July 1, 1993	Walter Junior Blair – Missouri; July 21, 1993	Succeeded by Frederick Lashley – Missouri July 28, 1993
