= Di-N-acetylchitobiase =

Protein found in humans

CTBS

Identifiers
- Aliases: CTBS, CTB, chitobiase
- External IDs: OMIM: 600873; MGI: 1921495; GeneCards: CTBS

Gene location (Human)
Chr.	Chromosome 1 (human)
Band	1p22.3	Start	84,549,611 bp
Band	1p22.3	End	84,574,480 bp

Gene location (Mouse)
Chr.	Chromosome 3 (mouse)
Band	3|3 H2	Start	146,155,550 bp
Band	3|3 H2	End	146,171,604 bp
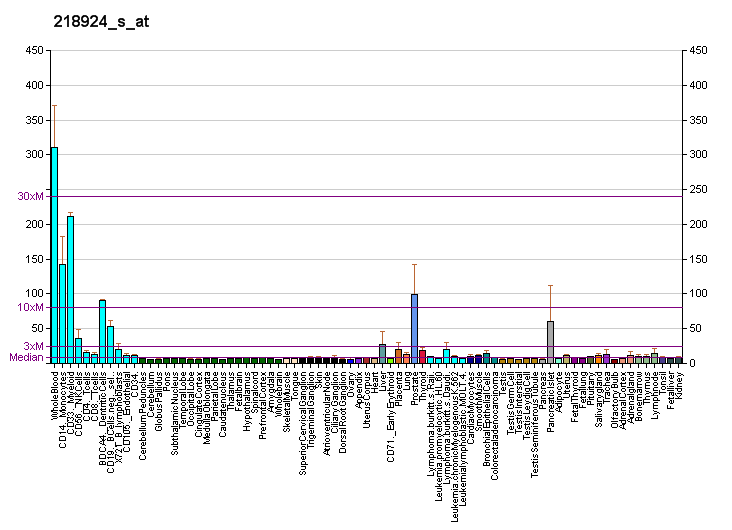

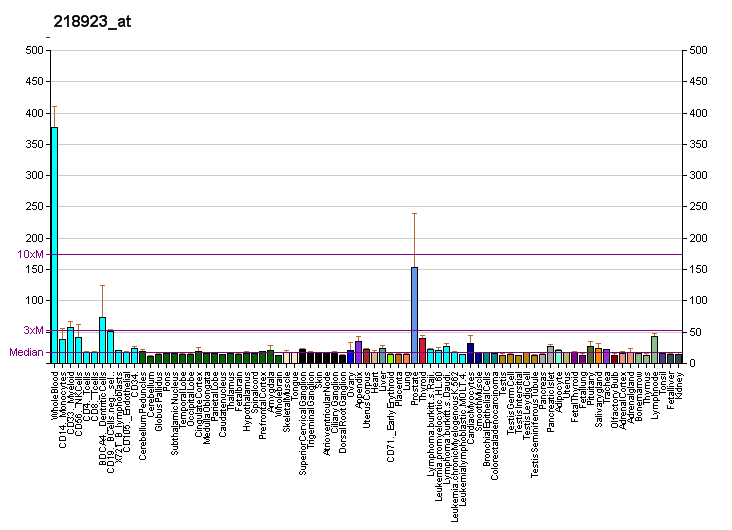
RNA expression pattern
Bgee	Human / Mouse (ortholog); Top expressed in: Epithelium of choroid plexus; monocyte; retinal pigment epithelium; blood; islet of Langerhans; stromal cell of endometrium; right lobe of liver; olfactory zone of nasal mucosa; Descending thoracic aorta; ascending aorta / Top expressed in: proximal tubule; right kidney; granulocyte; human kidney; secondary oocyte; decidua; medullary collecting duct; liver; efferent ductule; primary oocyte; More reference expression data
BioGPS	More reference expression data
Gene ontology
Molecular function	hydrolase activity, hydrolyzing O-glycosyl compounds; hydrolase activity; hydrolase activity, acting on glycosyl bonds; chitinase activity; chitin binding
Cellular component	lysosome; extracellular exosome; extracellular space
Biological process	oligosaccharide catabolic process; metabolism; chitin catabolic process; carbohydrate metabolic process
Sources:Amigo / QuickGO
Orthologs
Databases	NCBI: entry; OMA: entry
Species	Human	Mouse
Entrez	1486	74245
Ensembl	ENSG00000117151	ENSMUSG00000028189
UniProt	Q01459	Q8R242
RefSeq (mRNA)	NM_004388	NM_001293672; NM_028836
RefSeq (protein)	NP_004379	NP_001280601; NP_083112
Location (UCSC)	Chr 1: 84.55 – 84.57 Mb	Chr 3: 146.16 – 146.17 Mb
PubMed search
- Wikidata
View/Edit Human	View/Edit Mouse

Di-N-acetylchitobiase is an enzyme that in humans is encoded by the CTBS gene.
