= Body broker =

Occupation

A body broker (also non-transplant tissue banks) is a firm or an individual that buys and sells cadavers or human body parts.

Whereas the market for organ transplantation is heavily regulated in the United States, the use of cadaver parts for research, training, and other uses is not. Trade in these body parts is performed in a manner akin to raw materials, though many brokers say they charge fees as opposed to selling body parts.

Whereas body snatching was a common way of acquiring bodies for research up until the 20th century, modern body brokers usually receive cadavers via body donation. Body brokers often offer free cremation as a means to induce donation from families who are unable to pay funeral costs, returning ashes of part of the body to the next of kin. In some cases body brokers obtain bodies fraudulently by stating use of the donation for research, subsequently reselling the body for profit.

Body brokers also obtain cadavers and body parts from institutions who receive donations and have a surplus. In some cases, this is done illegally against the donor's wishes or by employees who act independently of the institution. In 2004, the UCLA Willed Body Program was suspended for a year after a scheme for the sale of body parts for profit involving its director at the time Henry Reid and body broker named Ernest Nelson was uncovered. The scheme yielded some 1.5 million dollars in profits. Reid and Nelson were subsequently convicted for theft and related tax offenses and were sentenced to 4 and 10 years respectively.

== Bibliography ==
- Goodwin, Michele (2006). Black markets: the supply and demand of body parts. Cambridge University Press. ISBN 978-0521852807.
- Cheney, Annie (2007). Body Brokers: Inside America's Underground Trade in Human Remains. Broadway Book. ISBN 978-0767917346.
