= Primal Pictures =

British human anatomy graphics business

- Industry: Medical, Healthcare, Life Science, Biotechnology
- Founded: 1991
- Headquarters: London, United Kingdom
- Website: primalpictures.com

Primal Pictures is a business that provides 3D graphic renderings of human anatomy.

== History ==
The company was founded in 1991.

In 2012, Informa acquired all of the company, previously owning 10 percent. In 2022, as part of Informa's sale of its Pharma Intelligence business, Primal Pictures became part of private equity firm Warburg Pincus. Later that year, Pharma Intelligence changed its name to Citeline and merged with pharmaceutical technology company Norstella.

== Products ==
Primal Pictures provides 3D graphic renderings of human anatomy, built using real scan data from the Visible Human Project, for use by healthcare students, educators, and medical professionals. It operates the Anatomy.tv online platform. In one study, Anatomy.tv was deemed the greatest value in undergraduate anatomy education "since it had highest scores for effectiveness as well as the lowest scores for cost."

== Development ==
The representation of the body in Primal's software is derived from medical scan data that has been interpreted by a team of Primal anatomists and translated into three-dimensional images by graphics specialists. The interactive anatomy visuals are accompanied by animations that demonstrate:

- Disease and conditions
- Function
- Biomechanics
- Surgical procedures.

== Awards ==
Primal Pictures won the Queen's Award for Enterprise in 2012.

== External websites ==
PrimalPictures.com

Anatomy.tv
