= Henry Reed (cricketer) =

English cricketer

Personal information
- Full name: Henry Albert Reed
- Born: 17 May 1892; Bristol, England
- Died: 3 May 1963 (aged 70); Redland, Bristol, England
- Batting: Unknown

Domestic team information
- Years: Team
- 1921–1923: Gloucestershire

Career statistics
| Competition | First-class |
|---|---|
| Matches | 6 |
| Runs scored | 110 |
| Batting average | 9.16 |
| 100s/50s | –/– |
| Top score | 45 |
| Catches/stumpings | 1/– |
- Source: Cricinfo, 1 April 2012

Henry Albert Reed (17 May 1892 – 3 May 1963) was an English cricketer. Reed's batting style is unknown. He was born at Bristol.

Reed made his first-class debut for Gloucestershire against Essex in 1921 County Championship. He made five further first-class appearances for the county, the last of which came against Essex in the 1923 County Championship. In his six first-class matches for Gloucestershire, he scored a total of 110 runs at an average of 9.16, with a high score of 45.

He died at Redland, Bristol, on 3 May 1963.
