= Visible Human Project =

NIH-funded project to digitally image the human body

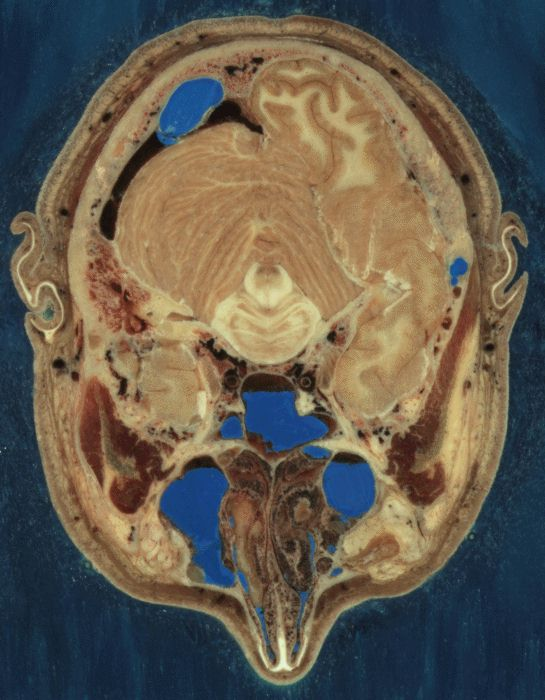
Cryosection through the head of a human male

The Visible Human Project is an effort to create a detailed data set of cross-sectional photographs of the human body, in order to facilitate anatomy visualization applications. It is used as a tool for the progression of medical findings, in which these findings link anatomy to its audiences. A male and a female cadaver were cut into thin slices, which were then photographed and digitized. The project is run by the U.S. National Library of Medicine (NLM) under the direction of Michael J. Ackerman. Planning began in 1986; the data set of the male was completed in November 1994 and that of the female in November 1995. The project can be viewed today at the NLM in Bethesda, Maryland. There are currently efforts to repeat this project with higher resolution images but only with parts of the body instead of a cadaver.

== Data ==
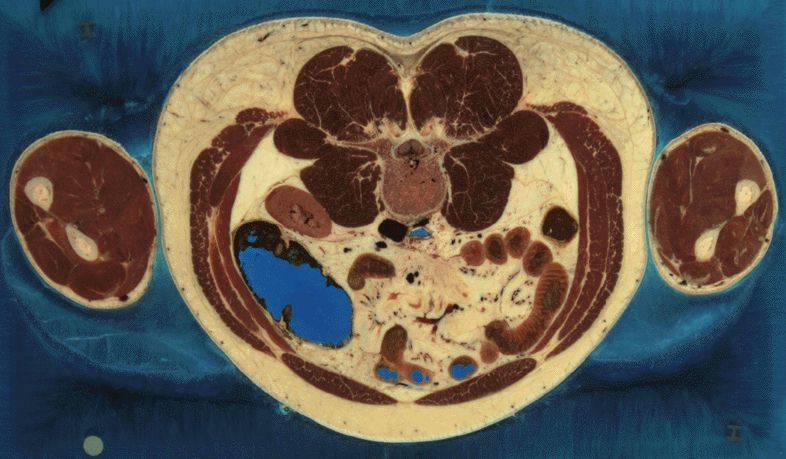
Cryosection through the abdomen and upper limbs of a human male

The male cadaver was encased and frozen in a gelatin and water mixture in order to stabilize the specimen for cutting. The specimen was then "cut" in the axial plane at 1-millimeter intervals. Each of the resulting 1,871 "slices" was photographed in both film and digital, yielding 15 gigabytes of data. In 2000, the photos were rescanned at a higher resolution, yielding more than 65 gigabytes. The female cadaver was cut into slices at 0.33-millimeter intervals, resulting in some 40 gigabytes of data.

The term "cut" is a bit of a misnomer, yet it is used to describe the process of grinding away the top surface of a specimen at regular intervals. The term "slice", also a misnomer, refers to the revealed surface of the specimen to be photographed; the process of grinding the surface away is entirely destructive to the specimen and leaves no usable or preservable "slice" of the cadaver.

The data are supplemented by axial sections of the whole body obtained by computed tomography, axial sections of the head and neck obtained by magnetic resonance imaging (MRI), and coronal sections of the rest of the body also obtained by MRI.

The scanning, slicing, and photographing took place at the University of Colorado Anschutz Medical Campus, where additional cutting of anatomical specimens continues to take place.

== Donors ==
The male cadaver is from Joseph Paul Jernigan, a 39-year-old Texas murderer who was executed by lethal injection on August 5, 1993. At the prompting of a prison chaplain he had agreed to donate his body for scientific research or medical use, without knowing about the Visible Human Project. Some people have voiced ethical concerns over this. One of the most notable statements came from the University of Vienna, which demanded that the images be withdrawn with reference to the point that the medical profession should have no association with executions, and that the donor's informed consent could be scrutinized.

The 59-year-old female donor remains anonymous. In the press she has been described as a Maryland housewife who died from a heart attack and whose husband requested that she be part of the project.

In 2000, Susan Potter—a cancer patient and a disability rights activist—became the third body donor to the project, spending the 15 following years until her death by pneumonia in 2015 as an outspoken advocate for medical education and a mentor of medical students at the University of Colorado. For nearly two decades, National Geographic documented the story of Susan Potter and Dr. Victor M. Spitzer, the director of the Center for Human Simulation at the University of Colorado Anschutz Medical Campus who led the NIH-funded project, releasing a video documentary in 2018. By the time Potter met Spitzer in 2000, she had gone through 26 surgeries and had been diagnosed with melanoma, breast cancer and diabetes: her participation in the Visible Human Project marked a significant departure from the original goals of the project, which up until then had only focused on the dissection and imaging of healthy bodies.

== Problems with the data sets ==
Freezing caused the brain of the man to be slightly swollen, and his middle ear ossicles were lost during preparation of the slices. Nerves are hard to make out since they have almost the same color as fat, but many have nevertheless been identified. Small blood vessels were collapsed by the freezing process. Tendons are difficult to cut cleanly, and they occasionally smear across the slice surfaces.

The male has only one testicle, is missing his appendix, and has tissue deterioration at the site of lethal injection. Also visible are tissue damage to the dorsum of each forearm by formalin injection and damage to the right sartorius from opening the right femoral vein for drainage. The male was also not "cut" while in standard anatomical position, so the cuts through his arms are oblique. The female was missing 14 body parts, including nose cartilage.

The reproductive organs of the female cadaver are not representative of those organs of normal anatomy. The specimen contains several pathologies, including cardiovascular disease and diverticulitis.

== Discoveries ==
By studying the data set, researchers at Columbia University found several errors in anatomy textbooks related to males, regarding the shape of a muscle in the pelvic region and the location of the urinary bladder and prostate.

== License ==
The data may be bought on tape or downloaded free of charge; Currently no license agreement is required to access or download the dataset, however general terms and conditions apply requiring acknowledgement of the National Library of Medicine with any use. Prior to 2019, one had to specify the intended use and sign a license agreement that allows NLM to use and modify the resulting application. NLM can cancel the agreement at any time, at which point the user has to erase the data files.

== Applications using the data ==
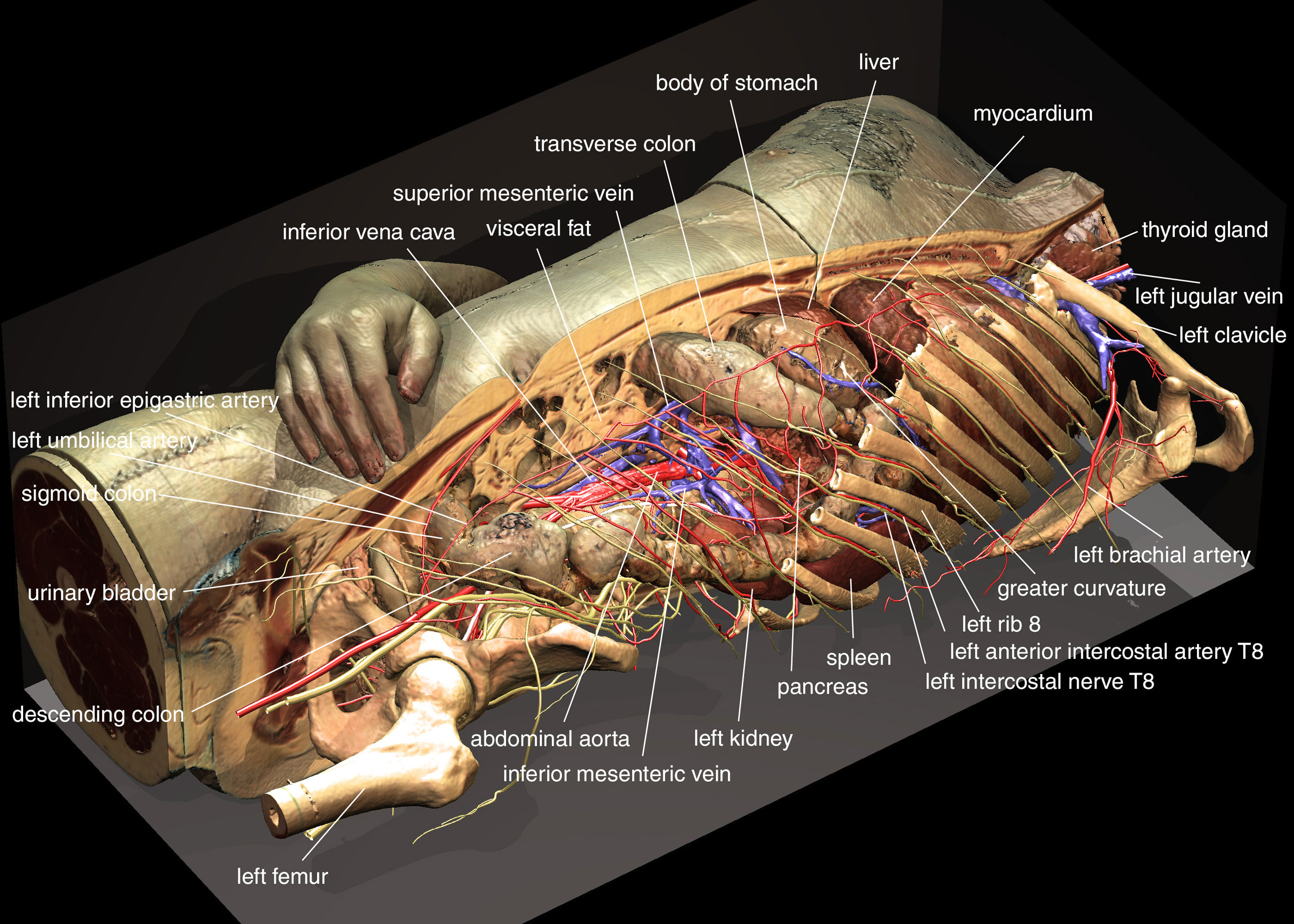
Reconstruction of the Visible Human's Inner Organs in the VOXEL-MAN Atlas (1998)

Various projects to make the raw data more useful for educational purposes are under way. It is necessary to build a three-dimensional virtual model of the body where the organs are labeled, may be removed selectively and viewed from all sides, and ideally are even animated. Two commercial software products accomplish the majority of these goals, the VH Dissector from Touch of Life Technologies and from Voxel-Man the VOXEL-MAN 3D Navigator Inner Organs - now freely downloadable. NLM itself has started an open source project, the Insight Toolkit, whose aim is to automatically deduce organ boundaries from the data.

The data were used for Alexander Tsiaras's book and CD-ROM Body Voyage, which features a three-dimensional tour through the body.

A "Virtual Radiography" application creates Digitally Reconstructed Radiographs and "virtual surgery", where endoscopic procedures or balloon angioplasty are simulated: the surgeon can view the progress of the instrument on a screen and receives realistic tactile feedback according to what kind of tissue the instrument would currently be touching.

Several other educational applications utilized form the visible human project include: multiple interactive anatomy computer software programs (Primal Pictures/Anatomy.tv, Anatomage), multimodality image restoration for hospital patients, body system relationships, and volumetric data.

The male data set was used in "Project 12:31", a series of photographic light paintings by Croix Gagnon and Frank Schott, and is the male Caucasian cadaver on the Anatomage Table 6.0 application.

== See also ==
- 3D Indiana
- Anatomography
- Insight Segmentation and Registration Toolkit
- Primal Pictures
- Susan Potter
- Visible Embryo Project
- ZygoteBody
