= Michael Durocher =

American convicted serial killer (1960–1993)

- Durocher was shown in court on August 16, 1993.
- Born: January 22, 1960; Florida, U.S.
- Died: August 25, 1993 (aged 33); Florida State Prison, Florida, U.S.
- Status: Executed by electrocution
- Conviction: First-degree murder (x5)
- Penalty: Death

Details
- Victims: 5
- Date: November 1983 – August 1988
- Location: Jacksonville, Florida (1983–1988)
- Date apprehended: August 24, 1988
- Imprisoned at: Florida State Prison

Michael Alan Durocher (January 22, 1960 – August 25, 1993) was an American convicted serial killer who murdered a total of five people between 1983 and 1988 in Jacksonville, Florida. First in 1983, Durocher committed the murders of his girlfriend Grace Reed, their six-month-old son Joshua Durocher and Grace Reed's five-year-old daughter Candice Reed. The fourth murder took place in 1986, when Durocher robbed and killed Thomas Underwood III at a local window decorations store. Two years later, in 1988, Durocher battered his roommate Eddie Dwayne Childers to death with a hammer.

Durocher was later arrested and charged with the murder of Childers, and sentenced to life imprisonment. After his sentencing and incarceration for murdering Childers, Durocher confessed to the four prior killings and during separate trials, Durocher was found guilty and given four death sentences for the 1983 and 1986 homicides. Durocher, who later waived his right to appeal, was executed by the electric chair on August 25, 1993.

== Early life ==
Born on January 22, 1960, Michael Alan Durocher was born and raised in Jacksonville, Florida. Durocher dropped out of high school, and went to work as a carpenter and landscaper. Durocher was arrested several times for juvenile offences as a teenager, and in 1980, at the age of 20, Durocher was found guilty and sentenced to jail for grand theft.

== 1983 Jacksonville triple murders ==
Between November 25 and 30, 1983, Michael Durocher committed the murders of his girlfriend and two children in Jacksonville, Florida.

Durocher first met his 29-year-old girlfriend Grace Reed and her three-year-old daughter Candice in New Jersey in 1981. Over the next two years, Durocher went back and forth between New Jersey and Florida to visit the mother-daughter pair while maintaining a romantic relationship with Grace. In early 1983, Grace gave birth to Durocher's son Joshua Michael Durocher (also named Joshua Michael Reed). After the birth of his son, Durocher visited his girlfriend and the children in New Jersey for three months before he brought the three of them back to Florida.

Although the exact date is known, Durocher killed Joshua and both the Reeds between November 25 and 30, 1983, coinciding with the U.S. Thanksgiving holiday. Durocher's motive for the murders remains unclear.

In one version, Durocher stated that on the night he committed the murders, he and Grace drank some Jack Daniel's together and discussed a murder-suicide pact. After agreeing to the pact, Durocher told Grace to lie to five-year-old Candice that they were heading for a picnic, and, as the girl walked down the path, Durocher used a shotgun to fatally shoot her. Later, he dug a shallow grave and buried her. Joshua was then stabbed to death and buried by his father in another grave. Finally, Grace laid down in a grave before she was shot in the back of the head by Durocher, who did not kill himself but departed the scene and lived in a motel.

In another version, however, Durocher claimed he believed Joshua was not his child. After the New Jersey welfare authorities sought child support for Joshua, Durocher decided to kill the children and Grace upon their return to Florida.

== Murder of Thomas Underwood III ==
On January 12, 1986, three years after he committed the 1983 Jacksonville triple murders, Michael Durocher committed his fourth murder.

Reportedly, when he was in Jacksonville, Durocher passed by a window decorations store and noticed that the back door was propped open. Seeing this, Durocher formulated a plan to rob the store for money to travel to his father's house in Louisiana, where he planned to murder his father. Afterwards, Durocher packed some clothes, armed himself with a gun, and headed for the store.

After arriving at the store, Durocher held the store's employee, 27-year-old Thomas Underwood III, at gunpoint, demanding that he hand over some money. However, after Underwood told him that there was no money in the store as it only accepted credit, Durocher shot him to death and stole about $30 or $40 in cash from Underwood's pockets. Durocher then searched the store for more things to steal, wiped his fingerprints from the scene, and departed in Underwood's automobile. Durocher later made the trip to Louisiana but decided to not go ahead with his plan to kill his father after discovering that his father had been diagnosed with cancer and would not live long.

== Murder of Eddie Dwayne Childers ==
On August 6, 1988, two years after killing Thomas Underwood, Michael Durocher wielded a hammer to kill his 38-year-old roommate Edward "Eddie" Dewayne Childers in Jacksonville. According to Durocher's testimony, he had formerly worked for Childers to sell goods at a flea market, but Childers had apparently owed him two weeks worth of salary. This issue prompted Durocher to attack Childers in his sleep, and Childers was battered to death with a claw hammer. Subsequently, Durocher took the body of Childers to a nearby lake, where he doused it in flammable liquid and set it on fire. The burning corpse of Childers was later discovered by two passers-by, who spotted smoke coming from nearby the lake.

== Court proceedings ==
=== Arrest and first murder trial ===
Three weeks after he murdered Eddie Childers, Michael Durocher was linked to the killing through police investigations, starting with the tip-off from Durocher's 16-year-old girlfriend that Durocher had bragged to her about killing Childers. As the police cornered Durocher at a local street on August 24, 1988, Durocher, who was armed with a shotgun, engaged in a five-hour standoff with the police until he finally surrendered in the end; he reportedly claimed he would rather die than to be captured alive prior to turning himself in. Upon his arrest, Durocher was charged with the murder of Childers.

Ultimately, in January 1989, Durocher was found guilty of first-degree murder, an offence that carries the death penalty under Florida State law. In the end, a Duval County jury recommended that Durocher be given a life sentence.

On January 30, 1989, Durocher was sentenced to life in prison by Circuit Judge David C. Wiggins.

=== Confession and second murder trial ===
While he was awaiting sentencing for the murder of Childers, on January 17, 1989, Durocher expressed that he would like to contact Detective John Bradley, the investigating officer of the Childers murder case, and confess to him about another murder he committed. In a subsequent interview with the police, Durocher admitted that he was the real perpetrator behind the murder of Thomas Underwood back in 1986.

After he was sentenced to life for killing Childers, Durocher was charged with the first-degree murder of Thomas Underwood in January 1989, and Assistant State Attorney Jon Phillips confirmed that he would seek the death penalty for Durocher.

After standing trial that same year, Durocher was convicted of killing Underwood as charged, and on July 7, 1989, Durocher was sentenced to death for the crime, and he was thus transferred to Florida State Prison, the state's designated facility for male death row inmates.

=== Further confession and third murder trial ===
After he was condemned to death row for the murder of Underwood, Durocher would contact the authorities a second time, expressing his intent to confess to further murders, and it was at this juncture, when Durocher finally admitted that he was involved in the murders of his son Joshua Michael Durocher and both his girlfriend and her daughter, Grace and Candice Reed. Aside from this, Grace was reported missing by her brother years prior in January 1986 (two years after she was murdered), after Grace's brother noticed that she was out of contact for a long time and could not trace her whereabouts. Durocher was therefore charged with three counts of first-degree murder for the 1983 murders, and faced the possibility of capital punishment once again. A Clay County grand jury indicted Durocher for the triple murder on January 11, 1990.

Durocher was originally scheduled to stand trial on October 16, 1990, for the 1983 Jacksonville triple murder. However, a week before he was supposed to stand trial, the skeletons of both Candice and Joshua were found after extensive search efforts by the police. This discovery prompted the prosecution to request for an indefinite postponement of the trial, and it was granted by Circuit Judge William Wilkes. After the discovery of the children's bodies, the remains of Grace were also found nearby where the police unearthed the children's skeletons. The trial of Durocher was later postponed until December 3, 1990.

On March 6, 1991, Durocher pleaded guilty to the murders of his girlfriend and the two children. After 35 minutes of deliberation on sentence, the jury unanimously recommended the death penalty for all three counts of first-degree murder in Durocher's case.

=== Appeals ===
On February 13, 1992, the Florida Supreme Court rejected Michael Durocher's direct appeal against his death sentence and conviction for the 1986 murder of Thomas Underwood.

On July 23, 1992, the Florida Supreme Court also dismissed Durocher's direct appeal against his death sentence and conviction for the 1983 murders of his girlfriend and his two children.

== Execution ==
Three years after receiving his initial death sentence, Durocher's execution was scheduled when Florida Governor Lawton Chiles signed his death warrant on May 26, 1993. The execution, set for August 25, 1993, was specifically for the 1983 Jacksonville triple murder. This death warrant did not apply to his separate death sentence for the 1986 murder of Thomas Underwood. According to reports, Durocher had repeatedly written to the governor to carry out his death sentence. Durocher also stated that he would rather be executed than face a series of execution stays or spend the rest of his life in prison (in the event that his death sentences were ever overturned). Durocher's mother reportedly supported her son's decision to waive his remaining appeals.

Subsequently, against Durocher's wishes, the lawyers affiliated with the state Office of Capital Collateral Representative (an organization of lawyers that specializes in death row cases) filed multiple appeals to oppose his death sentence. In response, Durocher wrote letters to the Florida Supreme Court stating that he wished to be executed, adding that the appeals filed by the lawyers should be thrown out. Eventually, on August 16, 1993, Circuit Judge William Wilkes, who was directed by the Florida Supreme Court to hear the appeals, officially ruled that Durocher was mentally competent to drop his appeals and he did so in a "knowingly, intelligently and voluntarily" manner, and he was thus suitable to face execution for the murders. This unusual aspect of Durocher's case made him potentially the first inmate on Florida's death row set to be executed on a first death warrant.

Despite the courts ruling that Durocher should be executed as he wished, a series of court appeals seeking to stave off his execution continued. The federal courts, particularly the U.S. District Court in Jacksonville and the 11th U.S. Circuit Court of Appeals, dismissed these appeals during the days leading up to Durocher's execution. On August 24, 1993, the day before Durocher's execution, the U.S. Supreme Court rejected the appeals of the lawyers opposing Durocher's execution.

On August 25, 1993, 33-year-old Michael Alan Durocher was put to death by the electric chair at the Florida State Prison. The official time of death was 7:15am. For his last meal, Durocher ordered five pounds of fried jumbo shrimp, a pint of chocolate ice cream and a two-liter bottle of Pepsi. Durocher declined to make a final statement prior to his execution. Durocher was one of the few condemned inmates in Florida who had volunteered to be executed after waiving their appeals against capital punishment since 1976.

== See also ==
- Capital punishment in Florida
- List of people executed in Florida
- List of people executed in the United States in 1993
- List of serial killers in the United States
- List of people executed by electrocution
- Volunteer (capital punishment)
