= Body donation =

Gifts of bodies for research and education

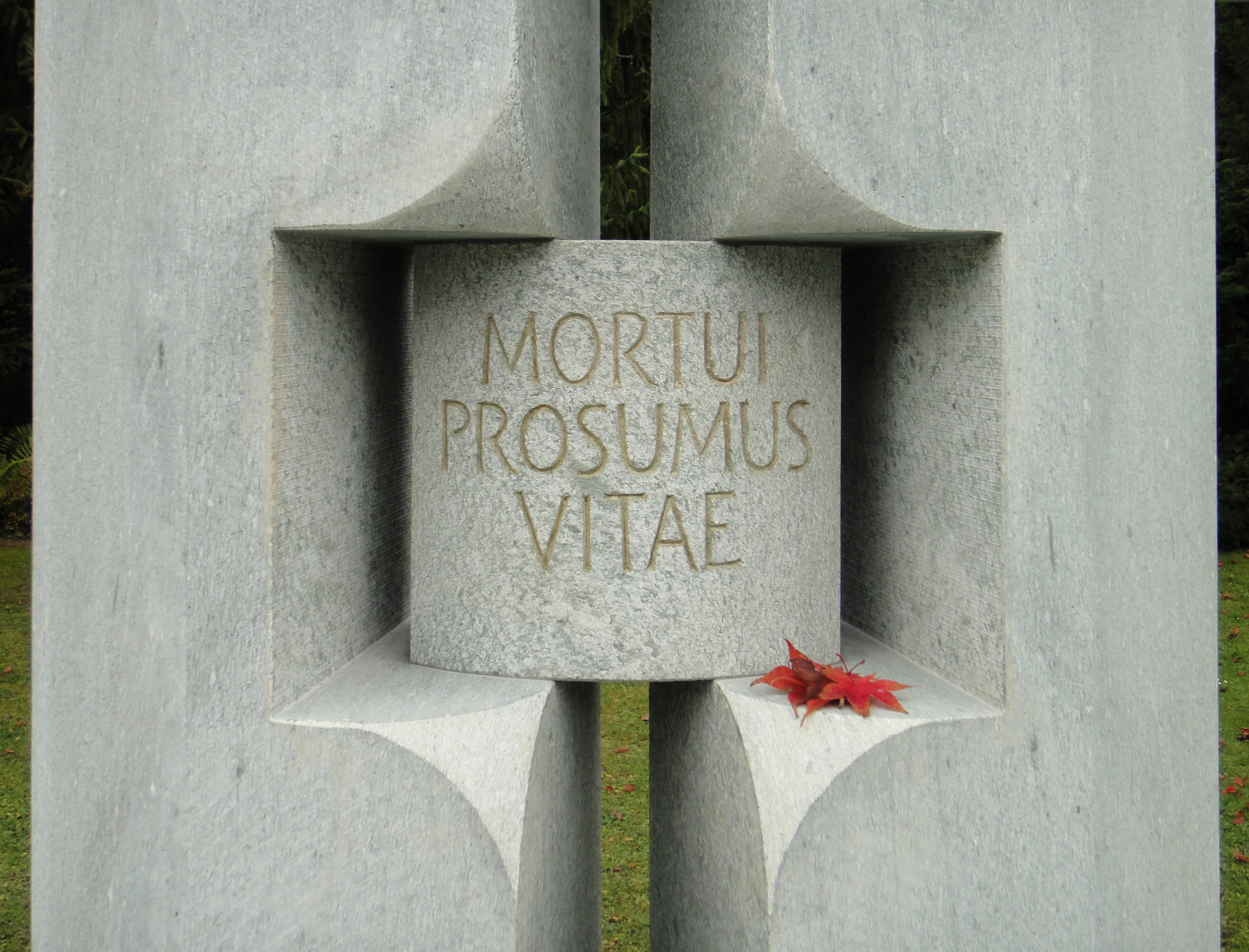
"Even in death do we serve life" (Latin: "Mortui prosumus vitae"): An inscription on a communal grave dedicated to body donors

Body donation, anatomical donation, or body bequest is the donation of a whole body after death for research and education. There is usually no cost to donate a body to science; donation programs will often provide a stipend and/or cover the cost of cremation or burial once a donated cadaver has served its purpose and is returned to the family for interment.

For years, only medical schools accepted bodies for donation, but starting in the early 2000 private programs (either for- or non-profits) also accept donors. Depending on the program's need for body donation, some programs accept donors with different specifications.

Any person wishing to donate their body may do so through a willed body program. The donor may at times, but not always, be required to make arrangements during their life with the local medical school, university, or body donation program. Individuals may request a consent form, and will be supplied information about policies and procedures that will take place after the potential donor is deceased.

The practice is still relatively rare, and in attempts to increase these donations, many countries have instituted programs and regulations surrounding the donation of cadavers or body parts. For example, in some states within the United States and for academic-based programs, a person must make the decision to donate their remains themselves prior to death; the decision cannot be made by a power of attorney. If a person decides not to donate their whole body, or they are unable to, there are other forms of donation via which one can contribute their body to science after death, such as organ donation and tissue donation.

== Motives for donors ==
The decision to become a body donor is influenced by factors such as: social awareness, cultural attitudes and perceptions of body donation, cultural attitudes and perceptions of death, religion, and perceptions of the body-mind relationship. Studies indicate most donors are primarily driven by altruism and their desire to aid the advancement of medical knowledge and to be useful after death. Other reasons include helping future generations, expressing gratitude for life and good health or for the medical field, to avoid a funeral or to avoid waste.

The offering of financial incentives as a way to increase donor numbers or as an acknowledgement for donors is generally considered to detract from the act of donation and serve as a deterrent. However, a US study showing a positive correlation between body donation numbers and funeral cover cost savings offered as compensation suggests that, in reality, the added incentive could be a persuasive factor for donors.

== Use of bodies ==
Bodies donated to any organization are used for scientific research and medical training. Bodies are used to teach medical students anatomy, but they are also used to improve and create new medical technologies. Many programs that accept body donations have specific research affiliations, these can be viewed by looking at each programs website. These can include cancer research, Alzheimer's research, and research into improving surgeries.

Some programs accept whole bodies but distribute different body parts based on need. This ensures a maximum benefit from each donation. These programs can assist with research as shown above, technical training, or improvement/research of medical devices.

After bodies are accepted for donation, a timeframe of six months to three years is expected before the donor's body will be returned to the family. This takes into account embalming, research, and the number of bodies the program has access to at the time.

== Body donation by country ==
=== Germany ===
Body disposal and donation are regulated by the Bestattungsgesetze (funeral laws) of the states. In Germany, the right to autonomy extends beyond death, as a result of which the instructions given by a deceased during their lifetime must be respected when dealing with their body. A body donation can only take place if the deceased signed a declaration of last will in their lifetime, stating the intention of donating their body to an anatomical institute. Relatives of the deceased can neither give permission nor deny body donation against said declaration, the institute however may deny the body. Denial of the body may occur if it carries infectious diseases, has had organs or body parts removed for donation or surgery, is gravely injured or otherwise unfit for teaching, if the body is located too far away from the institute or for reasons of storage capacity. Most institutes require an advance fee to be deposited to pay for funeral costs.

=== India ===
In 1948, the Anatomy Act was passed in all of India's states. This allows bodies to be donated by the donor and bodies to be claimed for medical and research use if there is no claim to one's body within a 48-hour timeframe. Similar to the US, India also has specific guidelines for accepting bodies for donations. Donations that are not deemed suitable include bodies with HIV/AIDS, hepatitis (A, B, and C), donated organs, extreme BMI, or skin diseases.

Some leaders have donated their bodies for medical research, such as communist leader Jyoti Basu and Jana Sangh leader Nanaji Deshmukh. Nowadays, many people in India donate their bodies after death by signing a pledge form with two accompanying witness signatures.

=== United States ===
Only the legal next-of-kin of the deceased can provide the necessary consent for donation if the donor did not provide it to the specific accepting program prior to death. Body donation is not regulated through licensure and inspection by the federal government and most states.

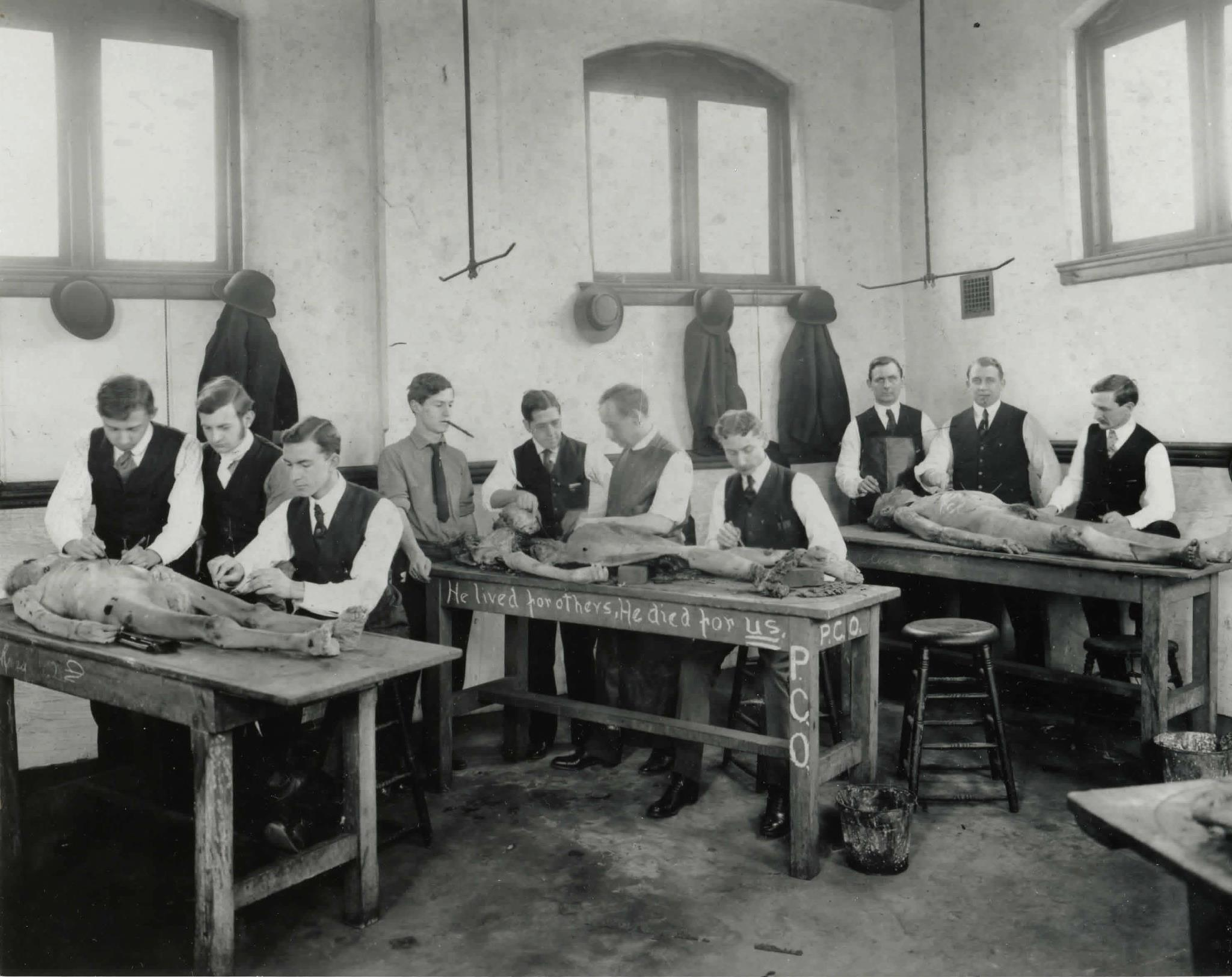
Dissection class at the Philadelphia College of Osteopathic Medicine, 1908. On the center table is written: "He lived for others, He died for us."

Body brokers (or non-transplant tissue banks) engage in the acquisition of cadavers, often via offers of free cremation, and then subsequently process the cadaver and resell body parts in a largely unregulated national market.

The legal right for an individual to choose body donation is governed by the Uniform Anatomical Gift Act, which has been largely adopted by most states. Laws relating to the transportation and disposition of human bodies currently apply, regardless of the recent House Bill introduced.

The American Association of Tissue Banks (AATB) provides accreditation to non-transplant tissue bank research and education programs to establish that the level of medical, technical, and administrative performance meets or exceeds the standards set by the AATB. Whole body donation and non-transplant tissue banking remains an industry with limited regulation, and while it is not a legal requirement, accreditation allows for individuals choosing to donate their body to medical research or education programs to choose a program with the highest quality standards.

The American Medical Education and Research Association (AMERA) is a peer-recognized national accrediting body in the United States that provides accreditation to organizations using standards developed solely for non-transplant organizations. This includes whole body donor organizations, university anatomical programs, bio-repository programs, and end users of human tissue. AMERA encourages the industry to become accredited and involved in establishing standards that are relevant to non-clinical tissue organizations.

Many medical programs in the United States now hold student-led memorial services for the donated bodies. This is to show respect for the donors and their families, and to shine a positive light on the process of body donation.

There are many private body donation programs in the US. Each of these private programs accepts bodies from certain surrounding areas. Most programs also have guidelines for bodies they will and will not accept. Generally, programs will not accept bodies that are positive for hepatitis (A, B, and C), HIV/AIDS, history of illegal drug use, or fall within an extreme category for their BMI. The embalming process adds even more weight to a donor's body, so if they have a high BMI the programs may not take them because they cannot handle the weight of the donor after embalming. If a donor has a specific disease prior to death, which is not contagious, and would like to be a part of a program's study, they may contact that research program specifically.

=== United Kingdom ===
Body donation in the UK is governed by the Human Tissue Authority (HTA) under the auspices of the Human Tissue Act 2004. The HTA licenses and inspects establishments, such as medical schools, which teach anatomy using donated bodies. Under the Human Tissue Act, written consent must be given prior to death; consent cannot be given by anyone else after death. The minimum age to consent to donate one's body in the UK is 17.

The Human Tissue Authority provides information to donors about where they can donate and answers many prevalent questions related to tissue donation on their website. The HTA provides the links to each establishment's information, but each establishment has its own guidelines for body donation. The HTA also provides the tools to find donation sites local to the person wishing to donate their body or tissues.

Although most establishments accept most donations, donors who have had an autopsy may be declined from a program. Certain programs also may decline bodies of donors who have died abroad.

== Notable people whose bodies were donated to science ==
- Lionel Courtenay (1879–1935), Australian senator
- Sir Adrian Boult (1889–1983), British conductor
- Sue Randall (1935–1984), American television actress
- Joseph Paul Jernigan (1954–1993), executed for murder, body used in the Visible Human Project
- Durward Gorham Hall (1910–2001), U.S. congressman
- Carolyn Price Horton (1909–2001), bookbinder and conservator-restorer of books
- Thomas Eagleton (1929–2007), U.S. senator
- Susan Potter (1927–2015), disability rights activist, body used in the Visible Human Project
