= Henry Reade =

English cricketer, clergyman and educator

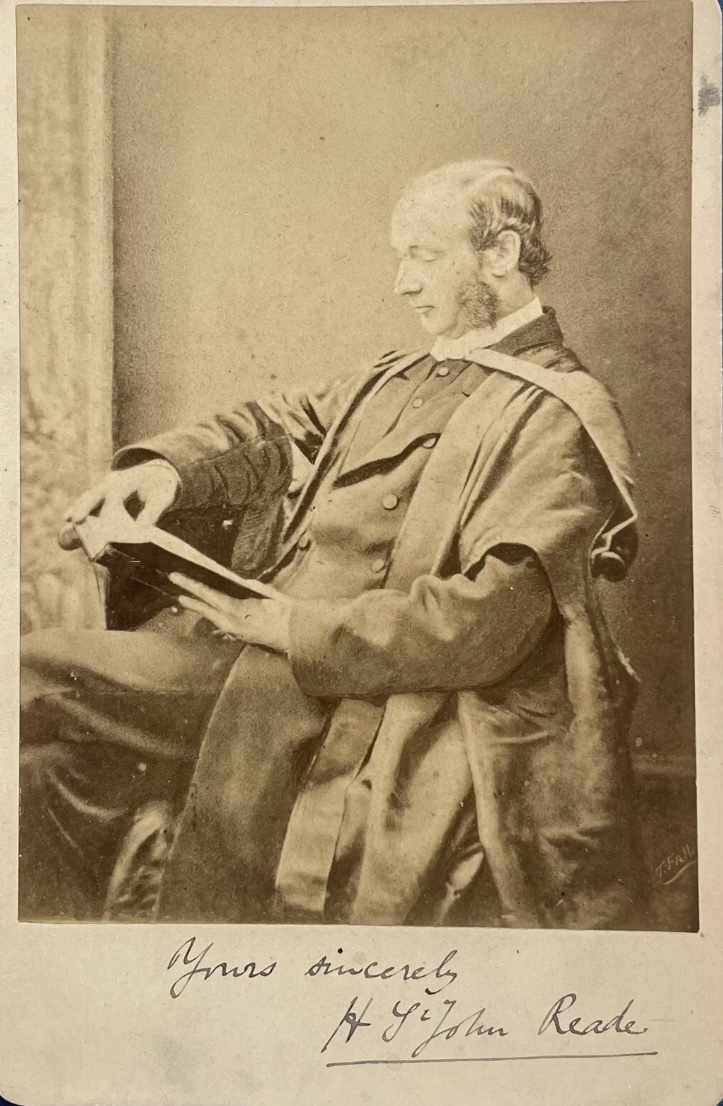

Personal information
- Full name: Henry St John Reade
- Born: 4 January 1840; Streatley, Berkshire, England
- Died: 13 February 1884 (aged 44); Shepherd's Bush, London, England

Domestic team information
- Years: Team
- 1861–1862: Oxford University

Career statistics
Competition	First-class
Matches	6
Runs scored	166
Batting average	16.60
100s/50s	0/0
Top score	49
Balls bowled	316
Wickets	13
Bowling average	11.69
5 wickets in innings	0
10 wickets in match	0
Best bowling	4/22
Catches/stumpings	7/–
- Source: Cricinfo, 18 March 2020

Henry St John Reade (4 January 1840 – 13 February 1884) was an English first-class cricketer, clergyman and educator.

The son of William Barrington Reade, he was born in January 1840 at Streatley, Berkshire. He was educated at Tonbridge School, before going up to University College, Oxford. In his first year at Oxford, he made his debut in first-class cricket when he played twice for the Gentlemen of Kent against the Gentlemen of England at Lord's and Canterbury in 1858. He later made three first-class appearances for Oxford University in 1861–62, in addition to playing for the Gentlemen of the South against the Gentlemen of the North in 1862. In six first-class matches, Reade scored 166 with a high score of 49. With the ball, he took 13 wickets with best figures of 4 for 22.

After graduating from Oxford, Reade took holy orders in the Church of England. He was an assistant master at Haileybury, before becoming the headmaster of Fauconberge Grammar School in Beccles and later the Godolphin School in Hammersmith.

Reade was headmaster of Oundle School from 1876 until 1883, when an argument led to a vote of no-confidence in him by the governing body. It asked for his resignation and got it.

Reade died at Shepherd's Bush in February 1884.
