= Henry Reade (FRS) =

Henry Reade (c. 1716–1762) was an English academic and government official. He was elected a Fellow of the Royal Society in 1748.

== Life ==
He was the son of Unton Reade, rector of Shilling Okeford, and was educated at Eton College. He was admitted to Queens' College, Cambridge in 1736. He graduated B.A. in 1739, M.A. in 1743, and became a Fellow of the college in 1744.

In 1741 Reade was an assistant master at Eton. In that year he wrote to George Selwyn, who had left Eton for Hart Hall, Oxford in 1739, in a letter beginning "an unwillingness to write to one's best friends is, of all others, the most oppressive and most affecting disease." He became tutor to the sons of the 9th Earl of Lincoln, an Eton and Cambridge contemporary. The Earl was the nephew of, and became the heir of, the Whig grandee Duke of Newcastle; and through the Duke's patronage, Reade was appointed to the Taxes Board.

Within the Exchequer, Reade held a number of positions from 1752, including that of Chief Clerk of the Bill Office. He resigned his Cambridge fellowship in or about 1755. He was the principal architect of the window tax changes financing the Seven Years' War, a tax which the Duke of Newcastle as Prime Minister increased in 1758 and 1761.

Reade was elected a Fellow of the Royal Society on 21 January 1747/8, and a Fellow of the Society of Antiquaries of London on 19 October 1749. He died on 13 December 1762.
