= Henry Reid =

Henry Reid is the former director of UCLA’s willed body program, who agreed to a plea deal in October 2008 for admitting his role along with a body broker to profit from lease-loaning donated anatomical material to outside corporate research interests in 2004. In 2008 Reid pleaded guilty in exchange for a four years and four months prison sentenced for illegally profiting from the lease-loan of body parts that had been donated to UCLA's Willed Body Program. Reid was ordered by Los Angeles Superior Court Judge Curtis Rappe to pay $500,000 in restitution to the David Geffen School of Medicine.
