= Harry Reed =

Comedian

Harry Reed was a comedian in the United States. He was African American.

He entered show business in 1892. He performed with his father Cicero Reed in a show titled Silence and Fun. He was afterwards part of comedy team McCarver, Reed and McCarver with Howard McCarver that headlined the Honolulu Coon Company show. He then joined the Smart Set Company and then performed with John Christian as Christian and Reed. They did a skating act and performed with Archer's Filipino Girls. He was then part of Ernest Hogan's Oyster Man Company, succeeding George Ali as Useless, the Dog. He was part of the Majestic Trio and Deas and Deas, becoming Deas, Reed, Deas with Lawrence and Ella Deas. He sang "In the Right Church but the Wrong Pew". He was also an acrobat.

== Shows ==
- Cooney Dreamland (1904)

== Filmography ==
- Harry Reed (1909)
