= Ruben Cantu =

American convicted murderer (1966–1993)

Ruben Montoya Cantu
- Born: December 5, 1966; San Antonio, Texas, U.S.
- Died: August 24, 1993 (aged 26); Huntsville Unit, Texas, U.S.
- Status: Executed by lethal injection
- Conviction: Capital murder
- Penalty: Death

Ruben Montoya Cantu (December 5, 1966 – August 24, 1993) was an American convicted murderer who was executed for a murder committed when he was 17 years old. During the years following the conviction, the surviving victim, the co-defendant, the district attorney, and the jury forewoman made public statements that cast doubt on Cantu's guilty verdict. This resulted in Cantu's case being posthumously reviewed. In 2007, a 113-page report concluded that Cantu's conviction was justified.

The report found that the recantations were inconsistent, unfounded, and/or tainted by a private investigator who was working on behalf of opponents of the death penalty. One had changed his story at least 8 times, one recanted only after receiving $1,000 meals, and a hotel room, then being subjected to questioning that was "improper and highly suggestive." Cantu had also repeatedly implicated himself in the murder to his friends, his lawyers, and even prison officials.

Cantu was implicated in and admitted his guilt to several lesser crimes, including an incident in which he shot an off-duty police officer four times. However, he maintained his innocence to the end in the murder. Shortly after his conviction, Cantu wrote a note to the people of San Antonio saying: "I have been framed in a capital murder case. I was framed because I shot an off-duty police officer named Joe De La Luz."

== Background ==
Ruben Cantu grew up with his mother and father until the age of 14, when the couple split up, with Ruben's mother moving 20 miles (32 km) away and Ruben and his father continuing to live in a trailer in a crime-ridden south San Antonio barrio. The neighborhood was home to a loose band of tough kids called the Grey Eagles, of which Cantu became a leader despite being rather small and in special-ed classes at school. By age 15, he was stealing cars for an organized auto theft ring, often spending days at a time driving stolen cars to Mexico for cash. When the San Antonio Police Department was embroiled in scandal, with vigilantes and drug-dealing officers well known to the community, Cantu was stealing cars and dodging the police. His older brothers had been arrested on drug and theft charges, but despite several run-ins with the police, Ruben never was convicted of anything before the November 1984 crime that led to his execution.

== Convicted of armed robbery and murder ==
The prosecution's case at the trial that convicted Ruben Cantu is summarized as follows: On the night of November 8, 1984, at approximately 11:30 p.m., Ruben Cantu (age 17 at the time) and his friend David Garza (15), broke into a vacant San Antonio house under construction at 605 Briggs Street and robbed two Hispanic males at gunpoint. The two victims, Pedro Gomez (25 or 35) and Juan Moreno (19) had been workmen sleeping on floor mattresses at a construction site, guarding against burglary, as a water heater had been recently stolen from the work site. The two victims were sleeping in their work clothes, with their pockets full of their cash earnings at the time of the robbery. Cantu and Garza were carrying a rifle, which they used to rob the two men of their wristwatches. As they tried to take their cash, they were interrupted by Gomez's attempt to retrieve a pistol hidden under his mattress. Gomez was shot at least nine times by the boys' rifle, dying instantly, and Moreno was also shot as many as nine times by the same rifle. Thinking they had killed both men, the two teens fled the scene. Juan Moreno survived the attack and was able to leave the house and call for help shortly after the event, though he lost one lung, one kidney, and part of his stomach.

Short on leads other than Moreno's description of two Latinos aged roughly 14 and 19, a neighborhood beat officer passed along a rumor from the halls of South San Antonio High School, where Cantu was in ninth grade. A shop teacher reported that three kids had been involved in the robbery and murder and that students were saying Cantu had done the killing. Questioned just before his arrest, Garza identified Cantu, saying he "saw Ruben come running out of the house" according to a detective's notes. The key trial witness, however, was Juan Moreno, the shooting survivor, who repeatedly identified Ruben Cantu in court.

A decade after Cantu was executed, Moreno recanted his story as did Garza.

== Police revive investigation after Cantu shoots off-duty officer ==
According to Juan Moreno, consistent with police records, he was visited by police in the hospital the day after the shooting. But, due to the severity of his wounds, he was unable to speak and could barely move. Five days later, in a second interview, Moreno was shown several photos. Cantu's photo was not included, and Moreno did not identify any of the people shown in the photos. On December 16, detectives visited Moreno a third time and showed him another array of five photos, including one of Ruben Cantu, who lived across the street from Moreno's job site where the crime occurred. He did not identify Ruben or anyone else from the photos shown to him during that police interview.

The case went cold, and no suspect was arrested. About four months after the robbery-murder, Cantu shot Joe De La Luz, an off-duty, plainclothes police officer, at the Scabaroo Lounge, a bar near Cantu's home. According to Cantu, the officer threatened him, revealing his concealed weapon, provoking Cantu (who was also armed) to fire at De La Luz, whom he did not know was a police officer. According to De La Luz, he was shot four times by Cantu despite no provocation.

== Execution ==
Shortly after being convicted by a jury of capital murder and sentenced, Cantu wrote a note to the people of San Antonio saying: "I have been framed in a capital murder case. I was framed because I shot an off-duty police officer named Joe De La Luz."

On August 24, 1993, at 22 minutes after midnight, at the age of 26, Cantu died by lethal injection, becoming the fifth juvenile offender to be executed by Texas. His final request was for a piece of bubble gum, which was denied. Asked if he had a last statement, he said "No, sir."

== Recent developments ==
Sam Millsap, who was the district attorney presiding over the Cantu case, proclaimed himself a "lifelong supporter of the death penalty" in his commentary published in the San Antonio Express-News in 2000. In a December 2005 interview with the Express-News Millsap expressed a newfound opposition to capital punishment. In that 2005 story, Millsap, an attorney in private practice at the time of the interview, says his decision to oppose the death penalty was affirmed, as evidence surfaced that Ruben Cantu was very likely innocent when prosecuted by Millsap's office and ultimately executed by the state of Texas. According to the 2005 Express-News story, "'It is troubling to me personally. No decision is more frightening than seeking the death penalty. We owe ourselves certainty on it.' He had that degree of certainty in the 1980s when he was the district attorney, 'when I was in my 30s and knew everything.' Now, he says, 'There is no way to have that kind of certainty.'" He went on to say that if Cantu was innocent, that meant the person who committed the murder remained free and that "the misconduct by police officers could be addressed today."

David Garza, Cantu's codefendant, has since admitted involvement in the burglary, assault and murder. He says he went inside the house with another boy, participated in the robbery, and saw the murder occur, but that his accomplice was not Ruben Cantu. According to Garza, the real murderer was Ramiro Reyes. This person, whose only criminal record is a single misdemeanor domestic assault conviction, denied that he had anything to do with the robbery and murder when he was interviewed by the Houston Chronicle in 2005.

Bexar County (San Antonio) District Attorney Susan Reed indicated to Rick Casey of the Houston Chronicle that she may bring a "murder by perjury" charge against Moreno, the surviving victim of the robbery-shooting and key prosecution witness. Juan Moreno was now a building contractor living in east San Antonio with a teenage child of his own. In 2006, Reed said that she was "deeply skeptical" of someone who recants testimony they gave 20 years previously but agreed that Cantu should not have been prosecuted as a death penalty case.

In 2007, Reed issued a 113-page report finding that Ruben Cantu was guilty of the crime for which Texas executed him in 1993. The three witnesses who have professed Cantu's innocence were found inconsistent, unfounded, and/or tainted by a private investigator who was working on behalf of opponents of the death penalty. Garza had changed his story at least 8 times, Moreno recanted after receiving $1,000 meals, and a hotel room, and under questioning that was "improper and highly suggestive." Garza's claim that Cantu's father told him he was out of town on the night of the murder was completely contradicted Fidencio saying he was in town that night.

The report also included a previously unpublicized account of a man who said Cantu had confessed to him in jail in 1985. It also included pretrial testimony in which Ramiro Reyes said Cantu told him about murder within days. Reyes had been initially doubtful that Cantu was being truthful. However, when he told Cantu that he did not believe him, Cantu replied, "I did it, I really shot them." When contacted about the case, Reyes reaffirmed that Cantu had confessed to the robbery and murder. He had also passed a polygraph in 1985 when questioned. Investigators also received a letter from Thomas Cooremans, who had known the Cantu brothers since the 1980s. Cooremans said Cantu had confessed to the murder while the two were in jail together in 1985.

During his admission interview with prison officials after his capital murder conviction, Cantu continued to implicate himself. He described the victim, the weapon used, and, when asked to explain the crime, he said, "it was a robbery." Inmates were not required to give information about the underlying offense and Garza had not done so.

Critics claimed that the report was compromised by the fact Reed was the judge who rejected Cantu's appeal in 1988 and set his execution date in 1993.

== See also ==
- Capital punishment for juveniles in the United States
- Capital punishment in Texas
- Capital punishment in the United States
- List of people executed in Texas, 1990–1999
- List of people executed in the United States in 1993
- Roper v. Simmons: 2005 U.S. Supreme Court ruling that the execution of those under 18 (at the time of committing the capital crime) is unconstitutional.
- Thompson v. Oklahoma: 1988 U.S. Supreme Court ruling that the execution of those who committed their crime when under the age of 16 is unconstitutional.
