= Andre Graham and Mark Sheppard =

Pair of American murderers executed in Virginia

- 1993 mugshots of Graham (left) and Sheppard (right)
- Born: Andre Lee Graham: March 4, 1970; Mark Arlo Sheppard: April 1, 1971
- Died: Andre Lee Graham: December 9, 1999 (aged 29) Greensville Correctional Center, Virginia, U.S.; Mark Arlo Sheppard: January 20, 1999 (aged 27); Greensville Correctional Center, Virginia, U.S.
- Cause of death: Execution by lethal injection
- Convictions: Sheppard; Capital murder (3 counts) (Note: The first two counts were related to the killings of the Rosenbluths, while a third count was added for the murder of multiple people.); Graham; Capital murder (3 counts) (Note: Graham was found guilty in two separate trials for these three counts. The first two counts were related to the killings of the Rosenbluths, while a third count was for the murder of Sheryl Stack.)
- Penalty: Death

Details
- Victims: Graham: 3; Sheppard: 2; (Note: The duo were suspected in at least ten murders.)
- Span of crimes: October 8, 1993 – November 28, 1993
- Country: United States (Virginia)
- Date apprehended: December 2, 1993

Andre Lee Graham (March 4, 1970 – December 9, 1999) and Mark Arlo Sheppard (April 1, 1971 – January 20, 1999) were a pair of American convicted murderers involved in two separate robbery-murder cases that took place in both Chesterfield County and Richmond, Virginia. In the first case, the pair first attacked a couple during a robbery at a local Richmond restaurant on October 8, 1993, before they shot the victims, leading to the death of Sheryl Stack, whose boyfriend survived the shooting. In the second case, the pair robbed a married couple, Richard and Rebecca Rosenbluth, inside their Chesterfield County home on November 28, 1993, before they shot the couple to death.

Both Sheppard and Graham were arrested and charged with the murders. In the case of the Rosenbluth murders, Sheppard was found guilty of double capital murder charges and sentenced to death on both counts, while Graham was sentenced to life in prison for killing the couple. In the other case of Stack's murder, Graham was separately tried and sentenced to death for capital murder. Sheppard was put to death on January 20, 1999, while Graham was executed 11 months later on December 9, 1999. Both men's death sentences was carried out by lethal injection at the Greensville Correctional Center.

== Murder of Sheryl Stack ==
On October 8, 1993, 22-year-old Mark Arlo Sheppard and 23-year-old Andre Lee Graham robbed and murdered a couple at a restaurant in Richmond, Virginia.

On that night itself, Sheryl Stack, a 20-year-old waitress and university student, and her 23-year-old boyfriend, Edward Martin, had both completed their work shift and were inside their car at the restaurant's car park when they were approached by Graham and Sheppard. The pair, who took the wallets of the couple, ordered them out of their car and onto the ground, promising not to harm them if they kept their eyes closed. However, even after complying to their attackers' demands, Stack and Martin were both shot execution-style by Graham, who left the scene together with Sheppard.

In the immediate aftermath of the shooting, both Martin and Stack were found lying face down in a pool of blood by James Jones, a night motel auditor, who called the police. Richmond police officer Harold Giles first responded to the scene, and according to him, he saw the couple trying to reach each other with their hands. The couple were rushed to the hospital, and Stack, who was in a comatose state, died two days after the shooting. As for Martin, he survived his injuries, but according to the surgeon that treated him, the bullet had damaged the left side of Martin's brain, leading to Martin's loss of his left eye and his body's right side became partially paralysed, and speech disability.

== Murders of Rebecca and Richard Rosenbluth ==
On November 28, 1993, more than a month after the murder of Sheryl Stack, both Andre Graham and Mark Sheppard were involved in the robbery-murder of a couple in Chesterfield County, Virginia.

The two victims, Richard Rosenbluth and Rebecca "Becky" Rosenbluth, aged 40 and 35 respectively, were said to be ordinary people with decent jobs, before they became addicted to cocaine in fall 1993, and began to procure their drugs from both Sheppard and Graham during the final months leading up to their deaths.

On November 28, 1993, Sheppard and Graham went to the Rosenbluth home intending to settle the debt and ended up murdering the couple. Richard was shot twice in the head, while Rebecca had been shot four times: three times in the head and once in the neck. Their bodies were not found until two days later inside their house. The couple were also robbed of their jewelry.

== Capital murder charges ==
On December 2, 1993, both Mark Sheppard and Andre Graham were arrested by police in Henrico County, after they were first spotted walking towards the stolen car of the Rosenbluths.

On December 3, 1993, the pair were charged with two counts of capital murder for the deaths of the Rosenbluths. Prior to the 2021 abolition of capital punishment in Virginia, the death penalty was the highest legal sentence for capital murder in the Commonwealth. Subsequently, the pair were linked to the murder of Stack through a firearm recovered during their arrest and they were also named a suspect behind the shooting of a businessman in Richmond on October 5, 1993.

In March 1994, the charges of capital murder were certified to a grand jury against Graham and Sheppard in the Chesterfield County case.

Subsequently, in June 1994, Graham was the only one of the pair to be charged with capital murder in the death of Stack, while Sheppard did not face charges for this killing.

== Trials and convictions ==
=== Rosenbluths murder trial ===
Graham

Graham was the first to stand trial for the double murder of the Rosenbluths.

During the trial itself, the prosecution presented evidence that two of the bullets that took the life of Rebecca Rosenbluth were fired from the same gun retrieved from Graham's girlfriend's home. A witness named Bill Wilkerson, who was a jewelry dealer, testified that Graham had sold him the victims' jewelry during the next two days after the Rosenbluths' murders. In his defence, Graham admitted that he did sell drugs to the couple but denied murdering them, claiming innocence in both killings and the defence also attempted to rebut Graham's girlfriend's testimony that the police never coerced her into testifying against her boyfriend.

On May 27, 1994, the jury found Graham guilty of both counts of capital murder, felony use of firearms and robbery.

The following day, on May 28, 1994, after receiving sentencing submissions from the prosecution and defence, the jury returned with their decision on sentence, recommending life imprisonment for the murder charge, thus sparing Graham the death sentence. Another 23 years for the remaining offences were also recommended by the jury.

On August 24, 1994, Graham was sentenced to life imprisonment with the possibility of parole after 25 years for one count of capital murder, plus an additional 23 years for robbery and felony use of firearms.

Sheppard

After the conviction of Graham, Mark Sheppard became the second person to stand trial for the Chesterfield County murders.

On September 22, 1994, Sheppard was found guilty of three counts of capital murder, one each for the victims and a third count for the murder of multiple people.

On September 23, 1994, the jury unanimously elected to give two death sentences for Sheppard on two counts of capital murder. Sentencing was scheduled to take place on December 15, 1994.

On December 15, 1994, Sheppard was formally sentenced to death by Chesterfield Circuit Judge William R. Shelton. Apart from the two death sentences, Sheppard was also given another 85 years' jail for the lesser charges he was convicted of.

=== Stack murder trial ===
After his conviction of the murder of the Rosenbluths, Graham was put on trial a second time before another jury, alone for the murder of Sheryl Stack.

During the trial, Edward Martin, Stack's boyfriend who survived the attack, testified against Graham, identifying him as the same shooter who robbed them at the carpark before killing his girlfriend. However, Graham denied that he murdered Stack, claiming that it was his accomplice who pulled the trigger and killed Stack.

On October 5, 1994, Graham was found guilty of capital murder by the jury for the death of Stack, and faced the death penalty a second time. The jury was set to deliberate on sentence for the capital murder count, while for the other charges, Graham was sentenced to life in prison for injuring Martin in the same attack and also for robbery, attempted robbery and felony use of firearms.

On October 6, 1994, the jury unanimously recommended the death penalty for Graham, and sentencing was scheduled to take place on November 17, 1994. Stack's parents reportedly supported the verdict and expressed relief that justice was served. Similarly, Martin's parents accepted the verdict.

On November 17, 1994, Graham was formally sentenced to death via the electric chair by Richmond Circuit Judge James B. Wilkinson.

== Executions of Sheppard and Graham ==
=== Appeals ===
On June 9, 1995, Andre Graham filed an appeal against his death sentence for the capital murder of Sheryl Stack, but the appeal was dismissed by the Virginia Supreme Court.

On November 3, 1995, the Virginia Supreme Court rejected the appeals of both Mark Sheppard and Andre Graham, upholding their capital murder convictions for the Rosenbluth killings, in addition to Graham's life sentence and Sheppard's death sentence.

On October 24, 1998, Sheppard's appeal was denied by the 4th Circuit Court of Appeals.

=== Sheppard's execution ===
Six years after the murder of the Rosenbluths, Mark Sheppard was scheduled to be executed on January 20, 1999. In a final series of appeals to oppose Sheppard's impending execution, Sheppard's counsel argued that their client was innocent of the killings and placed the blame on Sheppard's accomplice for personally shooting the couple to death. They also challenged the "fast track" appeals law in Virginia, claiming that the law had unconstitutionally denied Sheppard the due process before scheduling his execution.

Additionally, Sheppard's lawyers petitioned for clemency from the Governor of Virginia in a final bid to commute Sheppard's death sentence to life imprisonment. However, hours before the scheduled execution, Virginia Governor Jim Gilmore rejected the clemency petition. Similarly, Sheppard's appeals on unconstitutional grounds and innocence claims were all rejected, and on the afternoon before his execution, Sheppard's final appeal to the U.S. Supreme Court was dismissed by a 7–2 vote.

On January 20, 1999, 27-year-old Mark Arlo Sheppard was put to death by lethal injection at the Greensville Correctional Center. For his last meal, Sheppard requested the vegetarian meal set from the prison's menu: boiled potatoes, fried cabbage, bean entree, bread pudding, sliced bread, fruit punch and milk. He also spent his final afternoon receiving visits from his family members.

=== Graham's execution ===
Eleven months after Sheppard's death sentence was carried out, his accomplice Andre Graham was scheduled to be executed on December 9, 1999.

During his final days before the execution, Graham protested his innocence, claiming that he did not kill Sheryl Stack, and instead pinpointed his executed co-defendant Mark Sheppard as the true murderer of Sheryl Stack. Two other prisoners held in the same prison supported Graham's claims of innocence, claiming that they heard Sheppard confessing to them that Graham did not kill the victim and he should not have been convicted, and claimed responsibility for the murder of Stack. One of these prisoners chose to remain anonymous, while the other was James Henry Roane Jr., who was the accomplice of convicted spree killer Corey Johnson and convicted of the infamous Newtowne Gang murders. However, despite appeals to overturn his death sentence, Graham's clemency petition was denied by Governor Jim Gilmore, and the U.S. Supreme Court also rejected Graham's final appeal.

On December 9, 1999, 29-year-old Andre Lee Graham was put to death by lethal injection at the Greensville Correctional Center.

=== Aftermath ===
Richard Rosenbluth's parents, who lost both their son and daughter-in-law to the killing spree of both Sheppard and Graham, established a foundation to help crime victims.

== See also ==
- Capital punishment in Virginia
- List of people executed in Virginia
- List of people executed in the United States in 1999
