= Teresa Lewis =

American murderer (1969–2010)

- An undated photo of Lewis on death row
- Born: Teresa Wilson; April 26, 1969; Danville, Virginia, U.S.
- Died: September 23, 2010 (aged 41); Greensville Correctional Center, Jarratt, Virginia, U.S.
- Spouse: ? Bean (m. 1985, divorced) Julian Clifton Lewis Jr. (m. 2000; murdered 2002)
- Children: 1
- Status: Executed by lethal injection
- Convictions: Capital murder (2 counts); Conspiracy to commit capital murder; Robbery; Use of a firearm in the commission of a felony (3 counts)
- Penalty: Death (June 3, 2003)

Teresa Wilson Bean Lewis (April 26, 1969 – September 23, 2010) was an American murderer who was the only woman on death row in Virginia prior to her execution. She was sentenced to death by lethal injection for the murders of her husband and stepson in October 2002. Lewis sought to profit from a $250,000 life insurance policy her stepson had taken out as a U.S. Army reservist in anticipation of his deployment to Iraq.

In September 2010, Lewis became the first female inmate to die by lethal injection in the state of Virginia. The state had last executed a female, 17-year-old Virginia Christian, in 1912. The case led to debate over capital punishment owing to Lewis's sex, as well as to questions regarding her mental capacity since she was described as borderline intellectually disabled. Capital punishment was abolished in Virginia on March 24, 2021, officially making Lewis the last woman to be executed in Virginia.

== Background ==
Born on April 26, 1969, Teresa Wilson grew up in poverty in Danville, Virginia, where her parents both worked in a textile mill. Teresa sang in a church during her youth. At 16, she dropped out of school and married a man she met at that church. The couple had one daughter, Christie Lynn Bean, but the marriage soon ended in divorce, after which Teresa turned to alcohol and painkillers. Her mother-in-law, Marie Bean, described Teresa as "not right".

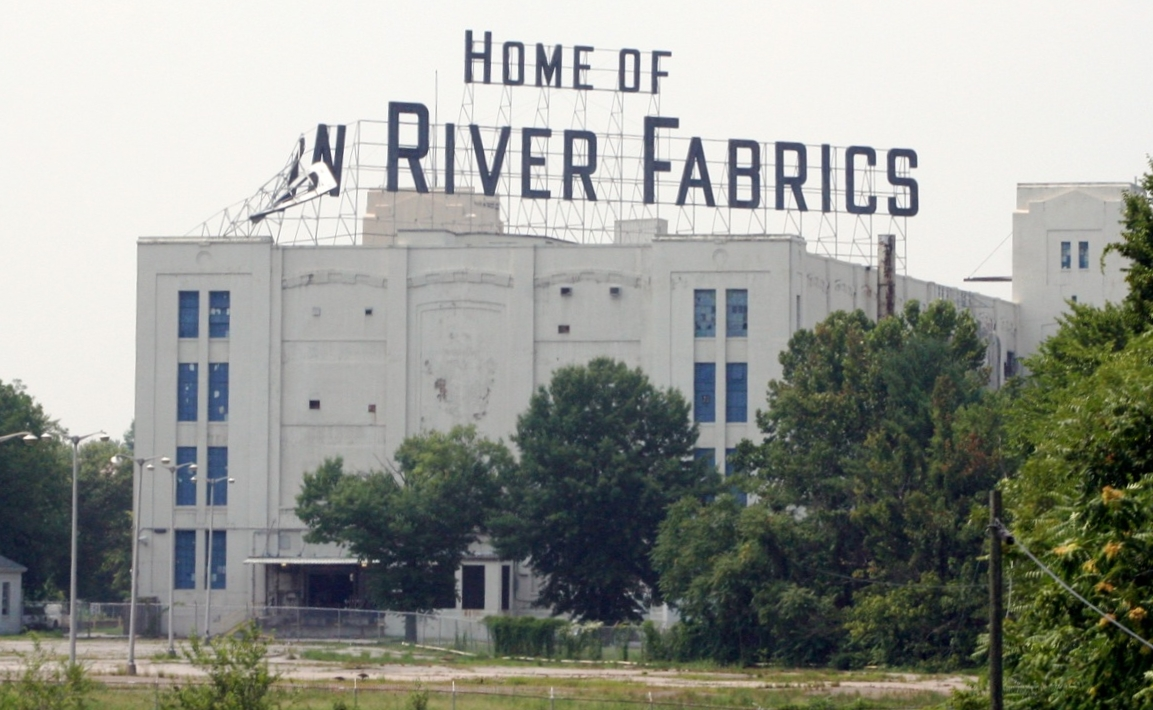
Teresa Wilson Bean met future husband Julian Clifton Lewis Jr. at the now-defunct Dan River textile mill.

Following dozens of low-paying jobs, Teresa Wilson Bean found work in the spring of 2000 at the Dan River textile mill, where her supervisor was Julian Clifton Lewis Jr. He was a recent widower with three children, Jason, Charles, and Kathy. Teresa, and her 16-year-old daughter Christie, moved into Julian's home in June 2000 and the two married soon after. In December 2001, Julian's older son, Jason Clifton Lewis, was killed in a car accident, leaving his father $200,000 from a life insurance policy. Julian used the money to buy a manufactured home on five acres of land in Pittsylvania County, Virginia.

In August 2002, Julian's younger son, Charles J. Lewis, obtained a $250,000 insurance policy in preparation for his impending deployment to Iraq as part of the United States Army Reserve. Charles designated his father as the primary and Teresa Lewis as the secondary beneficiaries.

== Murders ==
Mug shot of Matthew Jessee Shallenberger

In the fall of 2002, Teresa Lewis met 21-year-old Matthew Jessee Shallenberger and 19-year-old Rodney Lamont Fuller at a Wal-Mart in Danville and began a sexual relationship with both of them. In October 2002, Charles came home on a visit from Army training in Maryland. On October 23, Shallenberger and Fuller were given $1,200 by Lewis to purchase firearms and ammunition to kill Julian Lewis and his son Charles for the insurance money. Their first attempt to kill Julian while on the road did not succeed.

A week later, on the night of October 30, Shallenberger and Fuller entered the Lewises' trailer through a back door that Teresa had left open. While she waited in the kitchen, Shallenberger shot the sleeping Julian several times, while Fuller shot Charles in his bedroom with a shotgun. After discovering Charles was not dead, Fuller shot him twice more. Teresa waited 45 minutes before calling for help, and while waiting for the police to arrive, she removed money from her dying husband's wallet. She divided $300 with Shallenberger and Fuller before they left. However, sheriff's deputies arrived prior to Julian dying, and heard him say, "My wife knows who done this to me," while she had claimed the two had been killed by unidentified assailants in a home invasion.

Shortly after, Teresa Lewis was caught attempting to withdraw $50,000 from her dead husband's account with a forged check. Within a week, she confessed to the authorities that she had offered money to have her husband killed. During the investigation, prosecutors found that Lewis had been trying to gather the assets of her late husband and stepson even before they had been buried.

During the murder trial, the judge deemed Lewis the mastermind of the crime and called her "the head of this serpent." Barbara G. Haskins, a court-appointed, board-certified forensic psychiatrist, stated that "Cognitive testing showed a Full Scale IQ of 72. Verbal IQ was 70, and Performance IQ was 79." Haskins also stated that Teresa Lewis was and is able to make a plea agreement and enter pleas. Lewis's lawyer stated that, "She's not mentally retarded, but she is very, very close to it." In addition to a low IQ, Lewis was said by her lawyer to have an addiction to pain pills, and she was diagnosed with dependent personality disorder by three different forensic psychology experts.

=== Sentencing and appeals ===
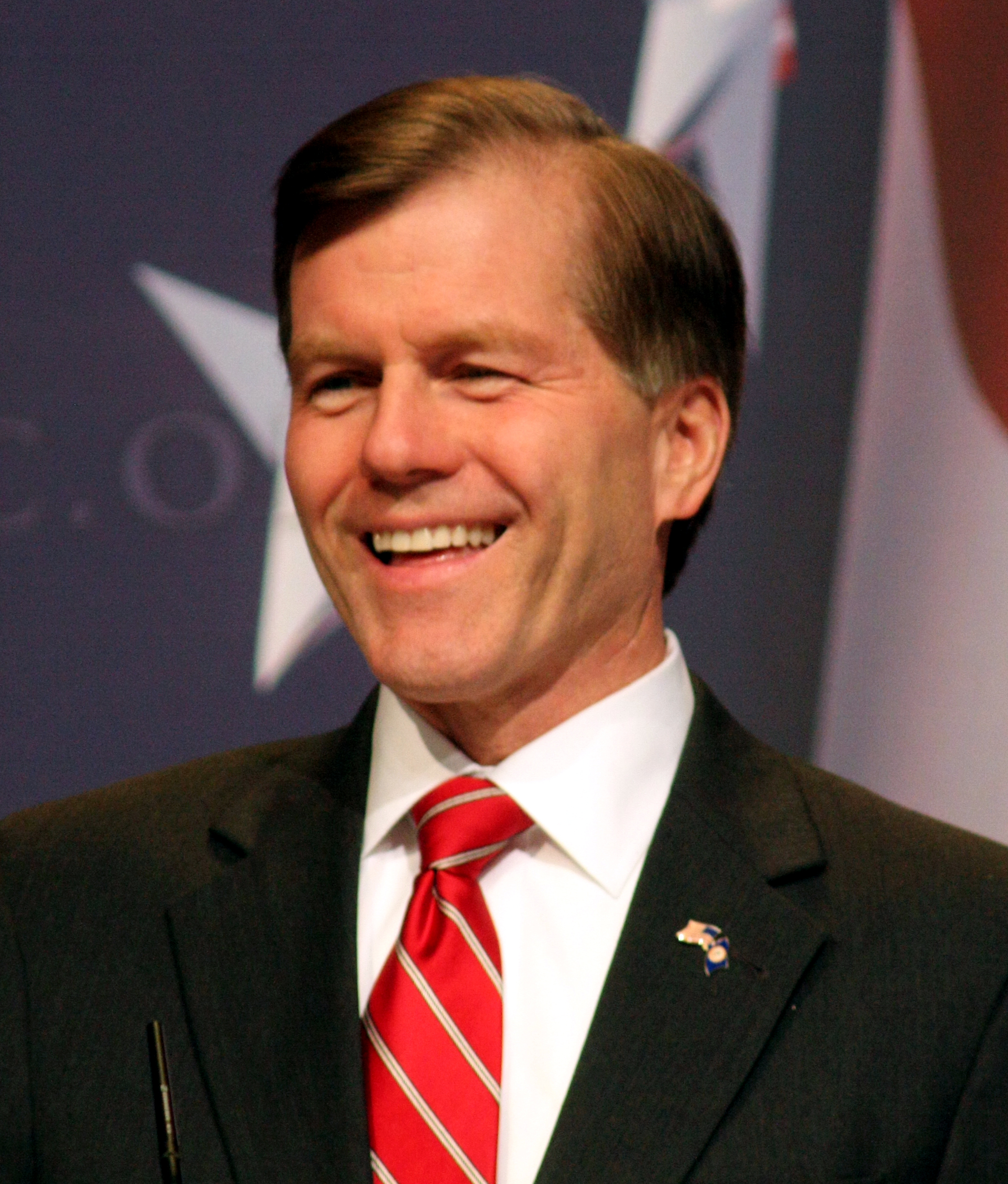
Governor Bob McDonnell declined to grant clemency.

Defense attorneys thought the evidence against Lewis was overwhelming and advised her to plead guilty to the capital charges in order to avoid a jury, and hope that the judge would show some leniency since Lewis had been cooperating with investigators. However, she was sentenced to death. The murders were capital crimes since the crimes were considered murder-for-hire. The two co-conspirators who actually did the shooting, Shallenberger and Fuller, were sentenced to life imprisonment at separate trials. Lewis was granted an automatic review by the Supreme Court of Virginia, which rejected the argument that it was unfair to execute Lewis while the co-conspirators got life sentences, as well as rejecting Lewis's challenges to the constitutionality of Virginia's death penalty law. Lewis was placed on death row at the Fluvanna Correctional Center for Women in Troy, Virginia.

Lewis's daughter, Christie Lynn Bean, served five years in prison because she knew about the plan but failed to report it.

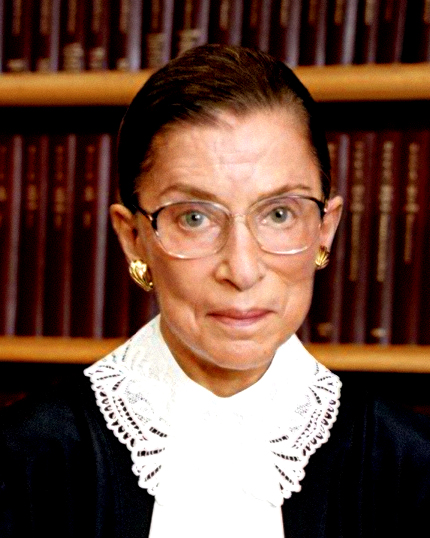
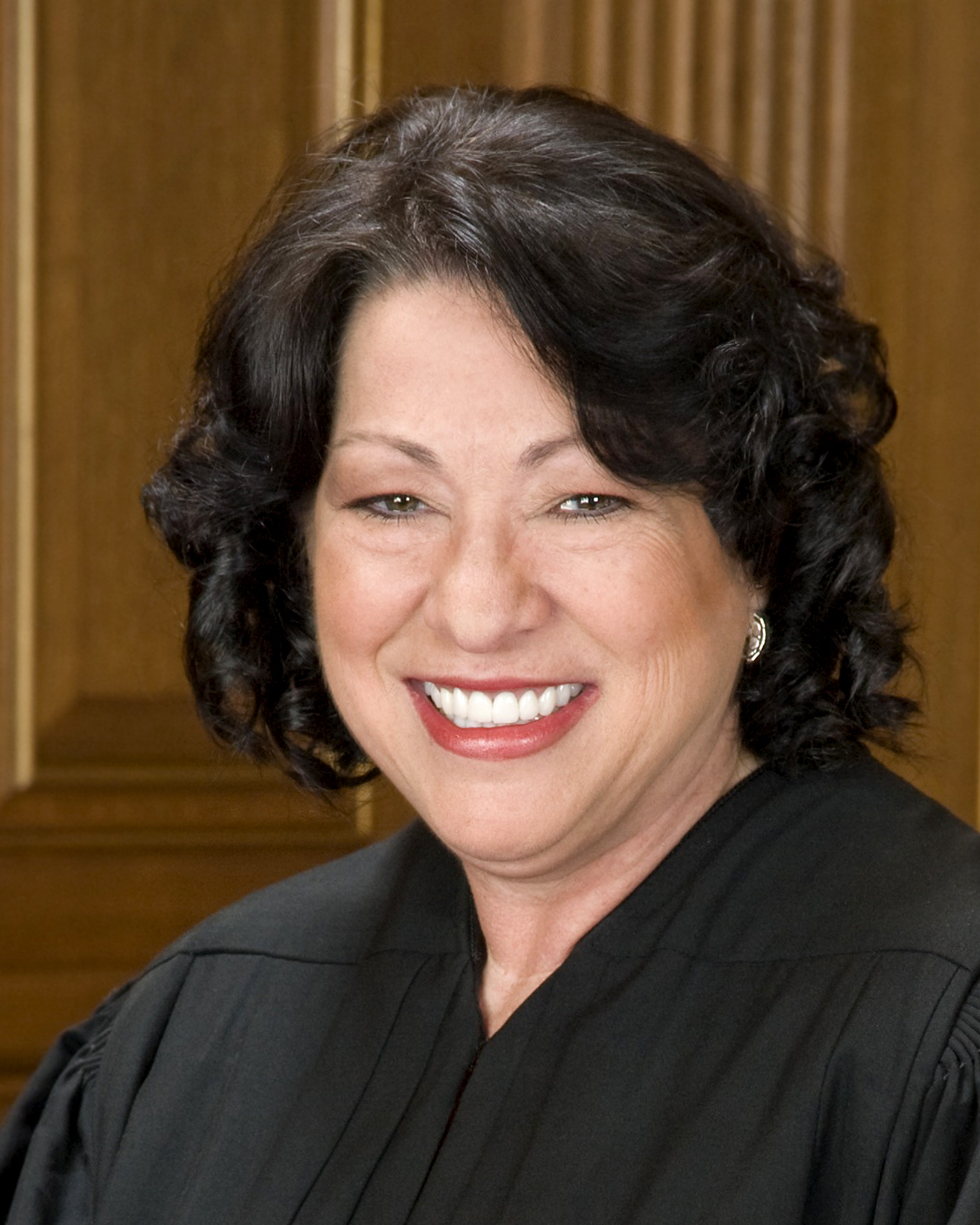
A Supreme Court order showed that dissenting Justices Ruth Bader Ginsburg (left) and Sonia Sotomayor would have granted a stay of execution.

In November 2004, a private investigator met Shallenberger at Wallens Ridge State Prison in Big Stone Gap, Virginia on behalf of Lewis. Shallenberger wrote in a partially transcribed affidavit: "Teresa was in love with me. She was very eager to please me. She was also not very smart." However, Shallenberger tore off and ate the parts of the document that he had signed. Shallenberger said, "What will happen will happen." Shallenberger committed suicide at the prison in 2006.

Over 7,300 appeals for clemency were reportedly sent to Virginia governor Bob McDonnell. Her supporters stated that "Lewis is deeply remorseful and has been a model prisoner, helping fellow female inmates cope with their circumstances." Her father, Melvin C. Wilson Sr., testified how Lewis took care of her invalid mother prior to her death. Lewis herself stated that "I just want the governor to know that I am so sorry, deeply from my heart. And if I could take it back, I would, in a minute ... I just wish I could take it back. And I'm sorry for all the people that I've hurt in the process." On September 17, 2010, McDonnell decided not to stop Lewis's upcoming execution, stating: "Having carefully reviewed the petition for clemency, the judicial opinions in this case, and other relevant materials, I find no compelling reason to set aside the sentence that was imposed by the Circuit Court and affirmed by all reviewing courts."

Her attorneys filed a petition for a writ of certiorari and an application for stay of execution with the U.S. Supreme Court, but were denied on September 21, 2010. Dissenting Justices Ruth Bader Ginsburg and Sonia Sotomayor indicated that they would have granted a stay.

== Execution ==
Lewis's last meal consisted of two fried chicken breasts, sweet peas with butter, a Dr Pepper and apple pie for dessert. Lewis addressed stepdaughter Kathy Lewis Clifton, who came to witness her execution, to apologize for killing her brother and father.

I just want Kathy to know that I love you, and I'm very sorry.

— Last words of Teresa Lewis, September 23, 2010

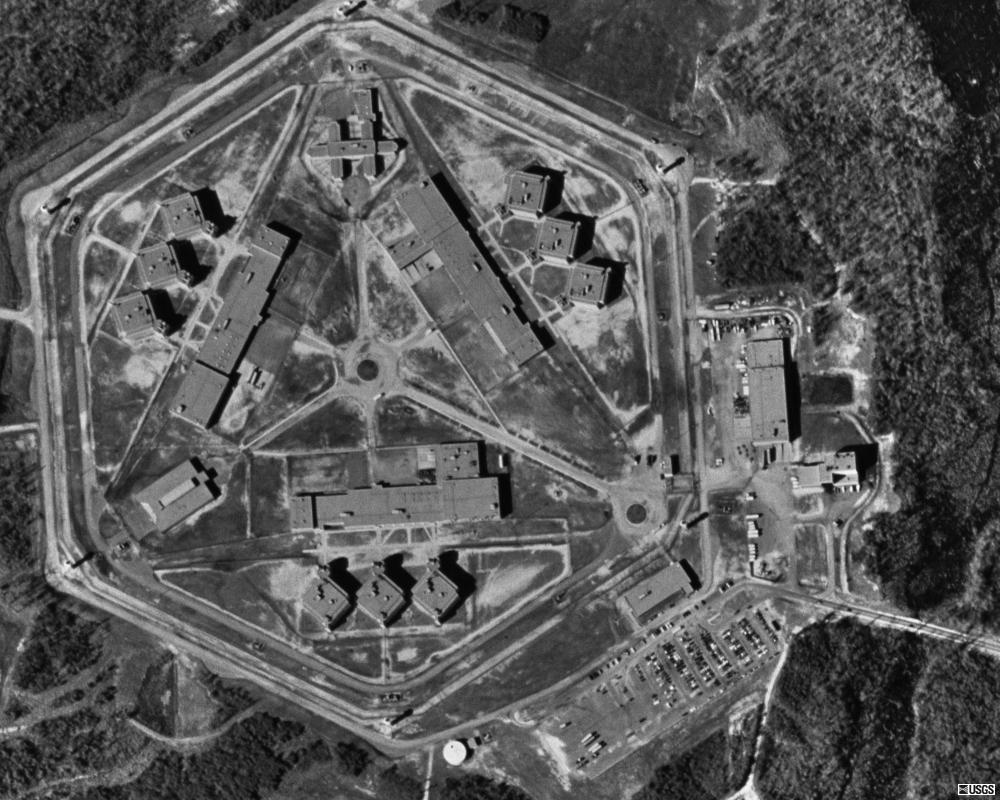
Lewis was executed at Greensville Correctional Center near Jarratt, Virginia.

She spent her last hours praying and singing hymns. Lewis was executed on September 23, 2010, at 9:13 p.m. by lethal injection, at Greensville Correctional Center near Jarratt. This made her the 12th woman to be executed in the United States since the death penalty was reinstated in 1976. Lewis was the first woman to be executed in Virginia by lethal injection; no woman had been executed in the state since Virginia Christian, who died in the electric chair in 1912. Lewis was also the first woman to be executed in the U.S. since Frances Newton in 2005 by the State of Texas, and the second woman to be executed since serial killer Aileen Wuornos in 2002 by the State of Florida. Her body was cremated following her execution.

=== Public reaction and aftermath ===
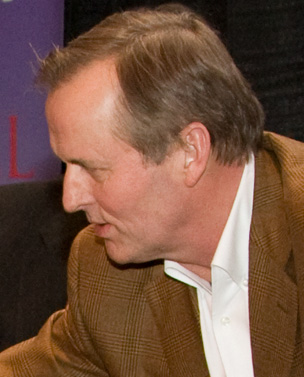
Novelist John Grisham publicly opposed the execution of Lewis.

Lewis's execution started a debate in the U.S. and other parts of the world concerning capital punishment, and more specifically the application of death sentences on women in murder cases. Richard Dieter, executive of the Death Penalty Information Center, argued that "so few women are involved in more heinous murders that, when they are, they cause greater offense than if they had been men. Virginia's attorney general really pushed the fact that she had committed adultery with a co-defendant and that she was somehow dishonored and should be looked down upon".

Ken Cuccinelli, then the Attorney General of Virginia, had stated that "the brutal nature of the crimes themselves as well as Lewis' callous, manipulating, adulterous, greedy, egregious behavior" justified the death sentence.

Thousands of supporters argued that her death sentence should have been commuted to life imprisonment. Lewis's attorney James E. Rocap III said, "A good and decent person is about to lose her life because of a system that is broken ... it is grossly unfair to impose the death sentence on her while Shallenberger and Fuller received life." Her low IQ also became a matter of discussion, with supporters citing this as a reason she should not have been sentenced to death. Legal novelist John Grisham echoed those sentiments and argued that evidence indicated Shallenberger, who had an IQ of 113, was the actual mastermind. Grisham quoted from an affidavit by co-conspirator Rodney Lamont Fuller: "As between Mrs. Lewis and Shallenberger, Shallenberger was definitely the one in charge of things, not Mrs. Lewis."

Iranian president Mahmoud Ahmadinejad cited the case to denounce Western media coverage of Sakineh Mohammadi Ashtiani, a woman in Iran who had been sentenced to death by stoning for adultery. He claimed the media's "heavy propaganda" campaign was perpetrating a double standard by not responding with similar outrage over Lewis's impending execution. Executive director Larry Cox of Amnesty International, which opposes the death penalty under all circumstances, stated: "Proceeding with this execution would come dangerously close to violating the U.S. Constitution, which prohibits capital punishment for those with 'mental retardation' — a precedent established thanks to Atkins v. Virginia."

== See also ==
- Capital punishment in Virginia
- List of people executed in Virginia
- List of people executed in the United States in 2010
- List of women executed in the United States since 1976
