= Dawud M. Mu'Min =

American murderer (1953–1997)

Dawud Majid Mu'Min
- Born: David Michael Allen; May 19, 1953; New York City, New York, U.S.
- Died: November 13, 1997 (aged 44); Greensville Correctional Center, Virginia, U.S.
- Status: Executed by lethal injection
- Convictions: Capital murder First degree murder Grand larceny
- Penalty: 48 years imprisonment (1973 murder); Death (1988 murder)

Details
- Victims: Charles Shupe, 43; Gladys Nopwasky, 42
- Date: February 27, 1973; September 22, 1988
- Country: United States
- State: Virginia

Dawud Majid Mu'Min (born as David Michael Allen) (May 19, 1953 – November 13, 1997) was an American convicted murderer executed by the State of Virginia for the September 22, 1988, killing of a retailer. In 1988, while serving a 48-year sentence for a previous murder, Mu'Min raped, robbed, and murdered a woman while in a prison work crew. He was sentenced to death for this murder and executed in 1997.

== Early life ==
Allen was born in New York City. As a teenager, he played basketball at Oak Hill Academy in Virginia.

== 1973 murder ==
On February 27, 1973, Allen, then 19, fatally shot 43-year-old Charles Shupe, a taxi driver, in Grayson County, Virginia. He was convicted of first degree murder and grand larceny and sentenced to 48 years in prison. While in prison, Allen converted to Islam and changed his name to Dawud Majid Mu'Min. He was also cited for 23 violations and denied parole six times.

== 1988 murder, trial, and execution ==
Mu'Min was assigned to a daily work crew detail with the Virginia Department of Transportation in Dale City. During his lunch break, he left his group, which was supervised only by an unarmed transportation crew worker, and made his way to a nearby business, Dale City Floors, in the Ashdale Shopping Center, and found 42-year-old Gladys Nopwasky, the proprietor. He raped her and then stabbed her 16 times in the neck and chest with a screwdriver. He took $4.00 and returned to the road detail, leaving Nopwasky's half-naked body lying in a pool of her blood.

Mu'Min was arrested and convicted of capital murder. The Corrections Department, meanwhile, responded to public outcry over the killing by revamping its 80-year-old practice of using inmate labor outside the prison fences. Virginia now allows only inmates convicted of nonviolent crimes and considered to be low security risks to take part in work details, which are supervised by armed corrections officers.

Mu'Min was executed by lethal injection at Greensville Correctional Center. He declined a last meal and had no last words.

== See also ==
- Capital punishment in Virginia
- List of people executed in Virginia
- List of people executed in the United States in 1997

== General references ==
- US Executions since 1976
