= Murder of Patricia Cubbage =

1980 mutilation and murder of a woman in Virginia

Patricia Cubbage
- Born: Patricia Darlein Huber Cubbage; September 15, 1958; Roanoke, Virginia, U.S.
- Died: November 13, 1980 (aged 22); Richmond, Virginia, U.S.
- Cause of death: Fatal blood loss by multiple wounds
- Resting place: Oakwood Cemetery
- Occupations: Drug dealer; police informant
- Known for: Victim of a torture and murder case

On November 13, 1980, in Richmond, Virginia, 22-year-old Patricia Cubbage (September 15, 1958 – November 13, 1980), a small-time drug dealer turned police informant, was killed by two men: Edward Benton Fitzgerald Sr. and Daniel Leroy Johnson. Fitzgerald, the ringleader of the crime, had raped, sodomized and later stabbed Cubbage 184 times due to his rage that Cubbage allegedly snitched on him, and Cubbage died as a result of the mutilation and stabbing.

Fitzgerald was found guilty of capital murder, and sentenced to death on September 4, 1981, and executed by the electric chair on July 23, 1992. Johnson, who turned state evidence against Fitzgerald, reached a plea agreement with the prosecution and was sentenced to 40 years' imprisonment on January 25, 1982, for first-degree murder and burglary.

== Mutilation and murder ==
On November 13, 1980, 19-year-old Daniel Leroy Johnson and 23-year-old Edward Benton Fitzgerald Sr. consumed drugs and alcohol at Fitzgerald's apartment before deciding to go to the house of 22-year-old drug dealer Patricia Cubbage to steal some drugs for their own use. When the two entered the house, they were caught red-handed by Cubbage, and as a result, Fitzgerald attacked Cubbage with a machete and struck her several times. Fitzgerald then forced the bleeding woman into the bedroom, where he stripped her, raped her and again attacked her with the machete, nearly chopping off Cubbage's thumb as she tried to ward off the blows. After the brutal attack, Cubbage pleaded with the men to take her to the hospital but Fitzgerald refused to do so. Fitzgerald's motive for the attack was purportedly anger that Cubbage, who was also a police informant, had allegedly snitched on him.

Afterwards, Johnson and Fitzgerald took Cubbage in the former's car and drove to a nearby wooded area, where Fitzgerald forced Cubbage to her knees and to engage in oral sodomy with him. When Cubbage said she could not continue the sodomy act due to her bleeding mouth Fitzgerald struck her again with the machete and proceeded to mutilate her by stabbing and slashing her repeatedly. At the end of the attack, Cubbage was left for dead. According to an autopsy report, Cubbage was stabbed a total of 184 times, with wounds present on virtually her entire body.

Later that day, Cubbage's body was discovered and, only hours after the murder, the police arrested Fitzgerald. Johnson himself was also apprehended and both of them were charged with kidnapping, raping, sodomizing and murdering Cubbage.

== Murder trials ==
Between 1981 and 1982, both Edward Fitzgerald Sr. and Daniel Johnson stood trial for their respective roles in the murder of Patricia Cubbage.

Fitzgerald

Fitzgerald was the first to stand trial for the murder of Cubbage. In March 1981, Chesterfield County grand jury formally indicted Fitzgerald for the charges of capital murder, robbery, and breaking and entering. Fitzgerald's accomplice, Daniel Johnson, testified against him after reaching a plea agreement with the prosecution, and a jailhouse informant, Wilbur Caviness, also testified that Fitzgerald admitted to him while in prison that he murdered Cubbage out of anger that the victim had informed the police on him, although Fitzgerald's defense was that he was under the heavy influence of drugs and alcohol at the time of the murder and had no memory of the crime.

On July 17, 1981, the jury found Fitzgerald guilty of one count each of capital murder, rape, abduction with intent to defile, robbery and burglary. The jury deferred their sentencing decision on the capital murder charge to the following day, but they also recommended four life sentences for all the remaining lesser charges preferred against Fitzgerald.

The prosecution, led by Commonwealth's Attorney Charles Watson, sought the death penalty on the basis that the murder of Cubbage was vile and depraved enough to call for such a harsh punishment, and pointed out that Fitzgerald was previously convicted in 1979 for shooting at his wife over her extramarital affair (which led to her becoming a paraplegic), which demonstrated a high propensity for him to commit more violent crimes in the future.

On July 18, 1981, the jury returned with their verdict, unanimously recommending that Fitzgerald should be sentenced to death for the charge of capital murder.

On September 4, 1981, Judge Ernest P. Gates concurred with the jury's recommendation, and he formally sentenced 23-year-old Edward Fitzgerald Sr. to death by electrocution for the capital murder of Patricia Cubbage, which was described as the "worst murder in Virginia history" by Commonwealth's Attorney Charles Watson.

Johnson

Johnson was the second to stand trial in September 1981, the same month that Fitzgerald was sentenced to death.

Johnson was convicted on September 24, 1981, for one count of first-degree murder and one count of burglary. As part of the agreement for his testimony against Fitzgerald, Johnson was sentenced to 40 years' imprisonment, which consisted of two consecutive terms of 20 years for both counts.

== Fitzgerald's appeals ==
On June 18, 1982, the Virginia Supreme Court rejected Edward Fitzgerald Sr.'s direct appeal against his death sentence.

On July 7, 1987, the Court of Appeals of Virginia dismissed Fitgerald's appeal.

On March 15, 1988, Fitgerald's second appeal to the Court of Appeals of Virginia was also dismissed.

As of January 1989, Fitzgerald was one of 16 condemned inmates from Virginia who filed federal appeals against their respective death sentences.

On May 9, 1991, the 4th U.S. Circuit Court of Appeals rejected Fitzgerald's appeal.

== Execution of Fitzgerald ==
On June 10, 1992, 12 years after murdering Patricia Cubbage, Edward Fitzgerald Sr.'s death warrant was signed by Chesterfield Circuit Judge John F. Daffron Jr., and Fitzgerald's death sentence was scheduled to be carried out on July 23, 1992.

After receiving his execution date, Fitzgerald chose to waive his right to file last-minute appeals against the death sentence. He was reportedly resigned to his fate and instructed his lawyers to not submit any appeals, unless there was a chance that it might work in his favour. Cotheo Kingma, a freelance journalist who planned to write a book about Fitzgerald's crime, noted that Fitzgerald was calm and relaxed but scared.

Although Fitzgerald did not file any last court appeals to delay his execution, his lawyers nonetheless filed for clemency in a final bid to commute his death sentence, and they argued that Fitzgerald's childhood was marred by abuse from his alcoholic father and his trial was also affected by legal flaws, among their reasons to push for clemency. Fitzgerald's lawyers also argued that it was unfair for Fitzgerald to be executed while his accomplice Daniel Johnson would be eligible for parole in about a year's time. Ultimately, Fitzgerald's clemency petition was denied by Governor Douglas Wilder. Apart from Fitzgerald's lawyers, international human rights group Amnesty International also appealed to the Virginia governor for clemency.

On July 23, 1992, 34-year-old Edward Benton Fitzgerald Sr. was put to death by the electric chair at the Greensville Correctional Center. At the time of his execution, Fitzgerald had spent a total of 11 years and eight months on death row. Fitzgerald's execution was the 15th execution after the Commonwealth of Virginia resumed executions in 1982, as well as the 178th in the United States after the nation's resumption of capital punishment in 1976.

For his last meal, Fitzgerald ordered a pizza and Pepsi-Cola, although he asked prison officials to not reveal his final meal request. Before the electric chair was activated, Fitzgerald was reportedly cooperative and made a peace sign with each hand while strapped to the chair. About 11 minutes after the electric chair was activated, Fitzgerald was pronounced dead at 11:12pm. Fitzgerald did not offer any final words before his death sentence was carried out.

According to a news report, Fitzgerald reconciled with his estranged brother James B. Fitzgerald, who was a Henrico County police sergeant. James told the press that he did not forgive his brother for committing a cold-blooded murder and as a police officer, he was never at peace with the nature of the killing. James added that their estrangement was due to Fitzgerald's drug addiction and involvement in street gangs while he himself left their hometown to join the police force, and James also refused to honor the defense's request back in 1981 to testify as a character witness for his brother out of responsibility as a law enforcement officer. James stated that as the execution date drew near, he gradually relented and went to visit his brother at least six times and reconciled with him, and also proclaimed that he felt proud that Fitzgerald accepted his fate.

Nearly 30 years after Fitzgerald was executed, the Commonwealth of Virginia officially became the first Southern state in the U.S. to abolish the death penalty in March 2021. In total, 113 executions – including Fitzgerald's – were carried out in Virginia between 1982 and 2017 prior to the abolition of capital punishment in Virginia.

== See also ==
- Capital punishment in Virginia
- List of people executed in Virginia
- List of people executed in the United States in 1992
