= 1994 Virginia bar murders =

Robbery and mass murder in Virginia, US

- Location: Virginia Beach, Virginia, United States
- Date: June 30, 1994
- Attack type: Murders by shooting
- Victim: 4
- Verdict: Guilty
- Convictions: Capital murder Multiple homicide murder (overturned); Use of firearms in the commission of a felony Robbery
- Sentence: Clagett; Death; Holsinger; Life imprisonment
- Convicted: Michael David Clagett, 33; Denise Rayne Holsinger, 29

On June 30, 1994, a robbery and mass shooting took place at the Witchduck Inn Restaurant and Lounge in Virginia Beach, Virginia, United States. The bar's owner Lam Van Son; two employees, Wendell G. Parish Jr. and Karen Sue Rounds; and a patron, Abdelaziz Gren, were murdered by Michael David Clagett and Denise Rayne Holsinger, who were arrested the following day.

Clagett and Holsinger were charged with multiple counts of capital murder, robbery, and other offenses. Holsinger was sentenced to life in prison, while Clagett received the death penalty. Six years after the murders, Clagett was executed in the electric chair on July 6, 2000.

== Crime ==
=== Preparation and motive ===
Prior to the murders, Denise Rayne Holsinger, one of the robbers responsible, was formerly employed as a waitress at the bar in question. Holsinger was suspected of stealing money from the bar and as a result, Holsinger was fired from her job. Out of revenge, Holsinger met up with her boyfriend, Michael David Clagett, and while having sex with Clagett and taking drugs together, she asked Clagett to help her get back at the bar's staff members. Together, they hatched a plan to rob the bar and shoot the people inside it. Clagett himself was a regular patron of the bar and was regarded as a longtime friend by the bar owner and the patrons and employees.

=== Robbery and murders ===
On the night of June 30, 1994, the date of Clagett's 33rd birthday, the couple carried out their plan, barging into the bar while armed with a gun. At gunpoint, Clagett held the bar's owner, the bar's two employees and a male patron hostage while Holsinger went to search for any money in the cash register. Later, Clagett brandished the gun and shot each of the four hostages once in their heads.

After the shootings, Holsinger and Clagett left the bar with approximately $400 taken from the cash register. The four victims — 41-year-old bar owner Lam Van Son, 31-year-old newly hired waitress Karen Sue Rounds, 32-year-old cook Wendel G. "J.R." Parrish Jr., and 34-year-old patron Abdelaziz "Aziz" Gren — died as a result of the shooting. Son's five-year-old child, a boy, was at the back of the shop when the shootings happened, and hence, he was not injured or killed.

Shortly after the murders, Richard T. Reed, a regular patron, arrived at around midnight, and noticed that the doors were locked even though the bar was supposed to close at 2am. Reed also heard music playing from inside the bar. Subsequently, Reed discovered the bodies of the four deceased victims after going in through the unlocked backdoor of the bar.

=== Victims ===
The owner, Lam Van Son (Vietnamese: Sơn Lâm Vân; July 10, 1952 – June 30, 1994), was a Vietnamese immigrant who fought for the special forces of the South Vietnamese military during the Vietnam War, but after the fall of Saigon in 1975, Son was detained at a re-education camp at the end of the war, before he fled to Thailand by boat and immigrated to the U.S. Son first met his wife Lanna Le Son in Lynchburg, Virginia; Lanna herself was also a Vietnamese refugee who fled from South Vietnam two days before the end of the war. The couple married in 1988 after five years of engagement, and together, they had one son. Son was the owner of three taverns, including the one where his death occurred.

Like Lam, Abdelaziz Gren (September 18, 1959 – June 30, 1994), who was born in Morocco, immigrated to the U.S. for a better life, and first settled in Virginia Beach in 1982. Gren, who completed his college education in Morocco, spoke fluent Arabic, French and English and planned to build his own company that mainly took charge of attracting Moroccan and French businesses to the U.S. Gren, however, died before the U.S. government approved papers for him to begin his business venture.

Karen Rounds (June 3, 1963 – June 30, 1994) formerly worked as a nurse before she was hired as a waitress, replacing Holsinger after she was laid off from her job. Rounds, who started working at the bar a month before her murder, returned to college and planned to pursue a new career related to computers, after she resigned from her previous job as a nurse at a Maryview Medical Center clinic in Churchland. Rounds originally resided in Pennsylvania (where she worked as a prison nurse) before she moved to Virginia due to her husband, a member of the navy, transferred to Virginia itself.

Wendel Parrish Jr. (August 7, 1961 – June 30, 1994) was the cook and handyman working at the bar when the murder spree occurred. Parrish was born in Prince George, Virginia, and resided in Hampton Roads as a child. He graduated from Bayside High School in 1981. Apart from this, there was little information relating to Parrish's life and background before he was murdered.

== Arrests and charges ==
A day after the bar murders, Michael Clagett was arrested for public intoxication, after he was caught sleeping in the bushes outside an apartment building. Detective Paul C. Yoakum took over the investigations, after Clagett was linked as a suspect behind the murders due to information provided by Holsinger, who was likewise arrested the same day as Clagett.

Clagett eventually confessed to the murders despite his initial denials of his involvement. As for Holsinger, she was also arrested but she denied any involvement in the mass shootings. Clagett would later confess once again to the murders in a television interview.

On July 1, 1994, Holsinger was charged with four counts of capital murder. Clagett himself was charged on July 2, 1994, with four counts of capital murder. Other charges against the couple included robbery and use of a firearm in the commission of a felony.

A grand jury issued two indictments for Clagett. In one of these indictments, Clagett was charged with one count of multiple homicide murder, an offense pertaining to the murders of multiple persons as part of a single transaction or same act. In another indicment, Clagett was charged with robbery, use of a firearm in the commission of a robbery, four counts of capital murder during the commission of a robbery, and four counts of use of a firearm in the commission of a murder.

== Trials of Clagett and Holsinger ==
=== Michael David Clagett ===
Michael David Clagett was born on June 30, 1961, to James T. Clagett and Iris M. Etter. Clagett, who had a brother, grew up in Ohio. According to Clagett's brother and mother, Clagett's father, who worked in Columbus, Ohio at a General Motors plant, was an alcoholic who did not have a good relationship with his family. Clagett was exposed to alcohol at a young age due to the alcoholism of his father, who died from liver cirrhosis in 1977 at the age of 52. Clagett was 18 when he married his then 14-year-old pregnant girlfriend, and she gave birth to a son; the marriage ended in 1991 due to Clagett abusing his wife.

During his childhood, Clagett was said to be the polar opposite of his older brother Jim, and often grew up under his shadow; Jim was outgoing, hard-working and active in scout-related activities and clubs, while Clagett was lazy, disruptive and began picking up negative habits at a young age. Clagett dropped out of high school in the 10th grade, the same year his parents divorced. Clagett would later obtain his high school diploma by passing the GED.

Clagett's first run-in with the law began at age 13, when he was arrested for charges of reckless driving, driving without a license and leaving the scene of an accident, which resulted in a $25 fine. The charge of driving without a license, however, was dismissed before his conviction. In 1979 and 1980, Clagett was caught thrice for passing bad checks in Ohio. He also struggled with drug and alcohol addiction since his teenage years.

From 1979 to 1982 Clagett served in the U.S. Navy, and the military life helped Clagett to stay away from drugs and alcohol. However, his discharge in 1984 caused him to return to his old ways. During his time in the navy, Clagett was court-martialed twice and even received two captain's masts for disciplinary issues, which led to a bad-conduct discharge on December 11, 1984.

Clagett's criminal history after his discharge began in 1984 with a series of offenses. In June, he was convicted of drinking in public and fined $10. A month later, he was charged with marijuana possession, followed by charges of driving under the influence, reckless driving, and driving without a license. By the end of that year, Clagett faced two felony counts of statutory burglary and other charges. In 1986, Clagett's three-year suspended sentence was revoked after he was found in possession of $18,000 worth of stolen property, including a car he drove from Virginia to Florida. He was sentenced to five years for possession of stolen property and grand larceny.

After his conviction, a probation officer noted that Clagett seemed unlikely to change his criminal behavior unless he made significant life changes. Clagett was released from prison in 1988 and placed on parole in Virginia Beach. However, in 1989, he tested positive for marijuana, leading to referral to a drug-treatment program. The program failed, and Clagett tested positive for marijuana use two more times while on parole. In July 1990, he was arrested for violating his parole and held in jail.

==== Clagett's trial ====
In April 1995, Clagett, who originally expressed his intention to plead guilty, informed the courts that he would stand trial. His trial by jury was scheduled to begin on June 26, 1995. Under Virginia state law, Clagett faced the death penalty or life imprisonment for the capital charges of murder preferred against him.

The trial lasted for ten days at the Virginia Beach Circuit Court. Clagett pleaded not guilty despite the fact that he already assumed responsibility for the killings. The prosecution adduced various evidence to support their case against Clagett, including the two videotaped confessions which Clagett made after his arrest. Closing submissions were made in the third week of the trial.

On July 11, 1995, Clagett was found guilty of all the murder charges and lesser offenses heard in his trial. From July 12 to 13, 1995, Clagett's sentencing trial commenced before the same jury that convicted him. The jury heard evidence of Clagett's past abuse of his ex-wife, as well as others like his purported remorse for his actions.

At the end of the two-day sentencing hearing, the jury returned with their verdict, sentencing Clagett to five death sentences for the varied charges of murder, in addition to 20 years' jail for the robbery charge and 23 years' jail for the firearm-related offenses. The trial judge was scheduled to formally sentence Clagett on September 18, 1995, although the date was postponed.

On October 23, 1995, Clagett was officially sentenced to death by Judge Edward W. Hanson Jr. during a formal court hearing.

=== Denise Rayne Holsinger ===
Denise Rayne Holsinger was born on August 15, 1964, in a small town in Kansas City, Missouri. Holsinger, whose parents separated when she was one year old, grew up with her grandparents, and her mother would remarry twice and have two younger sons. However, Holsinger had a traumatic past from a young age. She was first sexually assaulted by her stepfather at age eight, and at age 13, Holsinger was raped by an alcoholic man who took her in while she ran away from home for an unspecified period of time. She was raped for the third time at age 17 and therefore contracted chlamydia.

Apart from this, Holsinger struggled with a myriad of psychological problems and substance addictions. Holsinger was an alcoholic who had consumed methamphetamines, marijuana, barbiturates and synthetic narcotics. She was also diagnosed with clinical depression, bulimia and borderline personality disorder, and had attempted suicide thrice. A psychiatrist opined that Holsinger had hallucinations, wide mood swings and low self-esteem. Holsinger also struggled to come to terms with her obesity; she weighed 274 pounds before having her stomach stapled in 1992, and by that point in time, her weight dropped to about 130 pounds.

In her adulthood, Holsinger married her husband Randy Holsinger, who was part of the U.S. Navy, and they had three children - two girls and a boy. The couple were stationed in Tennessee before they moved to Virginia Beach due to the work of Holsinger's husband. The marriage, however, was fraught with conflicts at the time when Holsinger was arrested for the Virginia Beach bar murders.

==== Holsinger's trial ====
On May 1, 1995, Holsinger pleaded guilty to five counts of using a firearm to commit murder, four counts of capital murder and one count of robbery. As part of Holsinger's plea agreement, the death penalty was taken off the table. The maximum sentence Holsinger would face was life imprisonment for the most serious charge of capital murder.

On October 18, 1995, three days before Clagett was sentenced to death, Holsinger was sentenced to five concurrent life terms plus 23 years, and since her sentencing took place before the abolition of parole under Virginia laws, she would be eligible for parole after around 20 years into her sentence.

Reportedly, the family members of the victims were unsatisfied with the sentence of life and some, including Abdelaziz Gren's sister Khadija Gren; Wendell Parish Jr.'s mother Carolyn Cussins; Lam Van Son's widow Lanna Son and Karen Rounds's husband Kevin Rounds, said that Holsinger deserved the death penalty like Clagett. The prosecution was similarly dissatisfied with the mitigating evidence of Holsinger, calling her out for making excuses to support her behaviour behind the murders, which Commonwealth's Attorney Robert J. Humphreys described as "the most violent event that has occurred in the history of our young city".

== Appeals and execution of Clagett ==
On June 7, 1996, the Supreme Court of Virginia rejected Michael Clagett's appeal against his four death sentences for the four charges of capital murder, with respect to each of his victims. However, the fifth death sentence and Clagett's conviction of multiple homicide murder were overturned after the court found that this decision was potentially a case of double jeopardy to prosecute Clagett twice for the same offense. On April 5, 2000, Clagett's appeal was dismissed by the 4th Circuit Court of Appeals.

After exhausting his appeals, on that same year itself, Clagett's death warrant was finalized and his execution was scheduled to take place on July 6, 2000. During the final week leading up to his execution, Clagett appealed for the final time to the U.S. Supreme Court, stating that the jurors were not told that he would be ineligible for parole if they sentenced him to life in prison, which raised doubts over the validity of his sentencing, and claimed that his confession was made under the effects of alcohol and it should be thrown out.

Subsequently, shortly before the execution date and timing, the U.S. Supreme Court turned down Clagett's appeal and declined to issue a stay of execution. Clagett, who chose to be executed by electrocution instead of the usual method of lethal injection, expressed his intention to not appeal for clemency from then Governor Jim Gilmore.

On July 6, 2000, 39-year-old Michael David Clagett was put to death by the electric chair at the Greensville Correctional Center. Prior to his execution, Clagett wrote letters to Joshua Le Son, the son of Lam Van Son, one of the four victims who died in the shootings in 1994; Clagett expressed remorse for his actions and hoped to seek forgiveness from the boy for murdering his father. However, Joshua, who was 11 when the execution of Clagett was carried out, refused to accept Clagett's apology, and Son's widow said that the execution was "just".

== Imprisonment of Holsinger ==
In the aftermath of Michael Clagett's execution, Denise Holsinger remains in the Fluvanna Correctional Center for Women serving her life sentence as of 2025.

In 2002, two years after Clagett was put to death, Holsinger petitioned to the courts, seeking $250 a month of the $1,177 monthly retirement pension received by her ex-husband, who was discharged from the military in 2000; Holsinger had divorced her husband in 1996 while she was still incarcerated. Her plea was denied by Circuit Judge H. Thomas Padrick Jr., who found that she was not entitled to having a share of her ex-husband's pension, stating that Holsinger's ex-husband should keep the whole sum on account of his sole responsibility to raise their three children and he noted that Holsinger's conviction for murder was the catalyst behind the end of her marriage.

Starting from July 2011, Holsinger's case was referred to the state parole board for consideration of release by parole on an annual basis. However, her attempts to be granted parole were all denied by the prison authorities. The earliest records of Holsinger's parole hearings were dated back to July 7, 2018.

On April 20, 2020, Holsinger was denied parole on the grounds that the potential release of Holsinger would severely "diminish seriousness of crime". On July 8, 2021, the parole board refused to parole Holsinger, for similar reasons stated in its 2020 decision. On November 8, 2023, Holsinger's parole application was once again rejected by the parole board.

During her imprisonment, Holsinger appeared in a 2012 crime documentary titled Women Behind Bars. Her case was featured in the first episode of the second season.

== See also ==
- Capital punishment in Virginia
- List of people executed in Virginia
- List of people executed in the United States in 2000
- 2019 Virginia Beach shooting, another mass shooting in Virginia Beach
