= List of people executed in Virginia =

This is a list of people executed in Virginia after 1976. The Supreme Court decision in Gregg v. Georgia, issued in 1976, allowed for the reinstitution of the death penalty in the United States. Capital punishment in Virginia was abolished by the Virginia General Assembly in 2021.

== List of people executed in Virginia ==
Between 1982 and 2017, a total of 113 people were executed by the Commonwealth of Virginia. All were convicted of capital murder; all but one were male. Between 1982 and 1990, all executions were carried out at the Virginia State Penitentiary in Richmond. After the prison closed in 1991, all subsequent executions were carried out at Greensville Correctional Center.

No.	Name	Race	Age	Sex	Date of execution	County or Independent City	Method	Victim(s)	Governor
1	Frank Joseph Coppola	White	38	M	August 10, 1982	Newport News City	Electrocution	Muriel Hatchell	Chuck Robb
2	Linwood Earl Briley	Black	30	M	October 12, 1984	Richmond City	Electrocution	13 murder victims (Note: The 13 victims were: Orline Christian, Michael McDuffie, Edric Alvin Clark, Mary Gowen, Christopher Phillips, John Harvey Gallaher, Mary Wilfong, Blanche Page, Charles Garner, Thomas Saunders, Harvey Wilkerson, Judy Diane Barton, and Harvey Wayne Barton. Briley was executed for killing Gallaher.)	Chuck Robb
3	James Dyral Briley Jr.	Black	28	M	April 18, 1985	Richmond City	Electrocution	12 murder victims (Note: The 12 victims were: Michael McDuffie, Edric Alvin Clark, Mary Gowen, Christopher Phillips, John Harvey Gallaher, Mary Wilfong, Blanche Page, Charles Garner, Thomas Saunders, Harvey Wilkerson, Judy Diane Barton, and Harvey Wayne Barton. Briley was executed for killing the Bartons.)	Chuck Robb
4	Morris Odell Mason	Black	31	M	June 25, 1985	Northampton	Electrocution	Margaret Keen Hand (Note: Also killed Ursula Stevenson, but was executed for killing Hand.)	Chuck Robb
5	Michael Marnell Smith	Black	40	M	July 31, 1986	James City	Electrocution	Audrey Jean Weiler	Gerald Baliles
6	Richard Lee Whitley	White	41	M	July 6, 1987	Fairfax	Electrocution	Phoebe Parsons	Gerald Baliles
7	Earl Clanton Jr.	Black	33	M	April 14, 1988	Petersburg City	Electrocution	Wilhemina Smith	Gerald Baliles
8	Alton Waye	Black	34	M	August 30, 1989	Lunenburg	Electrocution	Laverne Marshall	Gerald Baliles
9	Richard Thomas Boggs	White	27	M	July 19, 1990	Portsmouth City	Electrocution	Treeby Shaw	Douglas Wilder
10	Wilbert Lee Evans	Black	44	M	October 17, 1990	Alexandria City	Electrocution	Alexandria Deputy Sheriff William Gene Truesdale	Douglas Wilder
11	Buddy Earl Justus	White	37	M	December 13, 1990 (Note: This was the last execution held at the Virginia State Penitentiary in Richmond, which closed the following day.)	Montgomery (Note: Was tried and convicted in Williamsburg.)	Electrocution	Ida Mae Moses (Note: Also killed Rosemary Jackson in Georgia and Stephanie Hawkins in Florida, but was executed for killing Moses.)	Douglas Wilder
12	Albert Jay Clozza	White	31	M	July 24, 1991 (Note: This was the first execution held at the Greensville Correctional Center in Jarratt.)	Virginia Beach City	Electrocution	Patricia Beth Bolton	Douglas Wilder
13	Derrick Lynn Peterson	Black	30	M	August 22, 1991	Hampton City	Electrocution	Howard Kauffman	Douglas Wilder
14	Roger Keith Coleman	White	33	M	May 20, 1992	Buchanan	Electrocution	Wanda Faye McCoy	Douglas Wilder
15	Edward Benton Fitzgerald Sr.	White	34	M	July 23, 1992	Chesterfield	Electrocution	Patricia Darlein Cubbage	Douglas Wilder
16	Willie Leroy Jones	Black	34	M	September 15, 1992	James City	Electrocution	Graham Adkins and Myra Adkins	Douglas Wilder
17	Timothy Dale Bunch	White	33	M	December 10, 1992	Prince William	Electrocution	Su Cha Thomas	Douglas Wilder
18	Charles Sylvester Stamper	Black	39	M	January 19, 1993	Henrico	Electrocution	Franklin Cooley, Agnes Hicks, and Stephen Staples	Douglas Wilder
19	Syvasky Lafayette Poyner	Black	36	M	March 18, 1993	Williamsburg City	Electrocution	5 murder victims (Note: The 5 victims were: Joyce Baldwin, Clara Louise Paulett, Chestine Brooks, Vicki Ripple, and Carolyn Hedrick.)	Douglas Wilder
20	Andrew J. Chabrol	White	36	M	June 17, 1993	Chesapeake City	Electrocution	Lisa Harrington	Douglas Wilder
21	Joe Louis Wise Sr.	Black	31	M	September 14, 1993	Mecklenburg	Electrocution	William Ricketson	Douglas Wilder
22	David Mark Pruett	White	44	M	December 16, 1993	Virginia Beach City	Electrocution	Wilma Harvey and Debra McInnis	Douglas Wilder
23	Johnny Watkins Jr.	Black	33	M	March 3, 1994	Danville City	Electrocution	Betty Barker and Carl Buchanan	George Allen
24	Timothy Wilson Spencer	Black	32	M	April 27, 1994	Arlington	Electrocution	5 murder victims (Note: The 5 victims were: Susan Tucker, Debbie Davis, Susan Hellams, Diane Cho, and Carolyn Hamm. Spencer was executed for killing the first four victims.)	George Allen
25	Dana Ray Edmonds	Black	32	M	January 24, 1995	Danville City	Lethal injection	John Elliot	George Allen
26	Willie Lloyd Turner	Black	49	M	May 26, 1995	Southampton	Lethal injection	W. Jack Smith Jr.	George Allen
27	Dennis Waldon Stockton	White	54	M	September 27, 1995	Patrick	Lethal injection	Kenneth Wayne Arnder	George Allen
28	Mickey Wayne Davidson	White	38	M	October 19, 1995	Smyth	Lethal injection	Doris Davidson, Mamie Clatterbuck, and Tammy Clatterbuck	George Allen
29	Herman Charles Barnes	Black	31	M	November 13, 1995	Hampton City	Lethal injection	Clyde Jenkins and Mohammed Afifi	George Allen
30	Walter Milton Correll Jr.	White	34	M	January 4, 1996	Franklin	Lethal injection	Charles Bousman Jr.	George Allen
31	Richard Townes Jr.	Black	45	M	January 23, 1996	Virginia Beach City	Lethal injection	Virginia Goebel	George Allen
32	Joseph John Savino III	White	37	M	July 17, 1996	Bedford	Lethal injection	Thomas McWaters	George Allen
33	Ronald B. Bennett	Black	42	M	November 21, 1996	Chesterfield	Lethal injection	Anne Keller Vaden	George Allen
34	Gregory Warren Beaver	White	30	M	December 4, 1996	Prince George	Lethal injection	Virginia State Trooper Leo Whitt	George Allen
35	Larry Allen Stout	Black	33	M	December 10, 1996	Staunton City	Lethal injection	Jacqueline Kooshian	George Allen
36	Lem Davis Tuggle Jr.	White	44	M	December 12, 1996	Smyth	Lethal injection	Jessie Geneva Havens (Note: Also killed Shirley Brickey, but was executed for killing Havens.)	George Allen
37	Ronald Lee Hoke	White	39	M	December 16, 1996	Petersburg City	Lethal injection	Virginia Stell	George Allen
38	Michael Carl George	White	39	M	February 6, 1997	Prince William	Lethal injection	Alexander Eugene Sztanko (Note: Also killed Larry Wayne Perry, but was executed for killing Sztanko.)	George Allen
39	Coleman Wayne Gray	Black	39	M	February 26, 1997	Suffolk City	Lethal injection	Richard McClelland	George Allen
40	Roy Bruce Smith	White	50	M	July 17, 1997	Prince William	Lethal injection	Manassas Police Officer John Conner	George Allen
41	Joseph Roger O'Dell III	White	54	M	July 23, 1997	Virginia Beach City	Lethal injection	Helen Schartner	George Allen
42	Carlton Jerome Pope	Black	35	M	August 19, 1997	Portsmouth City	Lethal injection	Cynthia Gray	George Allen
43	Mario Benjamin Murphy	Hispanic	25	M	September 17, 1997	Virginia Beach City	Lethal injection	James Radcliff	George Allen
44	Dawud Majid Mu'Min	Black	44	M	November 13, 1997	Prince William	Lethal injection	Gladys Nopwasky (Note: Also killed Charles Shupe, but was executed for killing Nopwasky.)	George Allen
45	Michael Charles Satcher	Black	29	M	December 9, 1997	Arlington	Lethal injection	Anne Borghesani	George Allen
46	Thomas Howard Beavers Jr.	White	26	M	December 11, 1997	Hampton City	Lethal injection	Marguerite Lowery	George Allen
47	Tony Albert Mackall	Black	33	M	February 10, 1998	Prince William	Lethal injection	Mary Elizabeth Dahn	Jim Gilmore
48	Douglas McArthur Buchanan Jr.	White	29	M	March 18, 1998	Amherst	Lethal injection	4 murder victims (Note: The 4 victims were: Douglas Buchanan Sr., Geraldine Buchanan, Donald Buchanan, and Joel Buchanan.)	Jim Gilmore
49	Ronald L. Watkins	Black	35	M	March 25, 1998	Danville City	Lethal injection	William McCauley	Jim Gilmore
50	Ángel Francisco Breard	Hispanic	32	M	April 14, 1998	Arlington	Lethal injection	Ruth Dickie	Jim Gilmore
51	Dennis Wayne Eaton	White	41	M	June 18, 1998	Rockbridge (Note: Was tried and convicted in Fauquier County.)	Lethal injection	4 murder victims (Note: The 4 victims were: Walter Custer Jr., Ripley Marston, Judy Ann McDonald, and Virginia State Trooper Jerry Hines. Eaton was executed for killing Hines.)	Jim Gilmore
52	Danny Lee King	White	47	M	July 23, 1998	Roanoke	Lethal injection	Carolyn Horton Rogers	Jim Gilmore
53	Lance Antonio Chandler Jr.	Black	25	M	August 20, 1998	Halifax	Lethal injection	Billy Dix	Jim Gilmore
54	Johnile L. DuBois	Black	31	M	August 31, 1998	Portsmouth City	Lethal injection	Philip Council	Jim Gilmore
55	Kenneth Manuel Stewart Jr.	White	44	M	September 23, 1998	Bedford	Electrocution	Cynthia Stewart and Jonathan Stewart	Jim Gilmore
56	Dwayne Allen Wright	Black	26	M	October 14, 1998	Fairfax	Lethal injection	Saba Tekle (Note: Also killed Odell Thomas in Washington, D.C. and Reginald Turman in Maryland, but was executed for killing Tekle.)	Jim Gilmore
57	Ronald Lee Fitzgerald	Black	29	M	October 21, 1998	Pittsylvania	Lethal injection	Coy White and Hugh Morrison	Jim Gilmore
58	Kenneth Wilson	Black	34	M	November 17, 1998	Newport News City	Lethal injection	Jacqueline Stephens	Jim Gilmore
59	Kevin Wayne Cardwell	Black	29	M	December 3, 1998	Henrico	Lethal injection	Anthony Brown	Jim Gilmore
60	Mark Arlo Sheppard	Black	27	M	January 20, 1999	Chesterfield	Lethal injection	Richard Rosenbluth and Rebecca Rosenbluth	Jim Gilmore
61	Tony Leslie Fry	White	23	M	February 4, 1999	Chesterfield	Lethal injection	Leland Jacobs	Jim Gilmore
62	George Adrian Quesinberry Jr.	White	37	M	March 9, 1999	Chesterfield	Lethal injection	Thomas Haynes	Jim Gilmore
63	David Lee Fisher	White	57	M	March 25, 1999	Bedford	Lethal injection	David William Wilkey	Jim Gilmore
64	Carl Hamilton Chichester	Black	36	M	April 13, 1999	Prince William	Lethal injection	Timothy Rigney	Jim Gilmore
65	Arthur Ray Jenkins III	White	29	M	April 20, 1999	Warren	Lethal injection	Floyd Jenkins and Lee Brinklow	Jim Gilmore
66	Eric Christopher Payne	White	26	M	April 28, 1999	Richmond City	Lethal injection	Ruth Parham and Sally Marie Fazio	Jim Gilmore
67	Ronald Dale Yeatts	White	38	M	April 29, 1999	Pittsylvania	Lethal injection	Ruby Meeks Dodson	Jim Gilmore
68	Tommy David Strickler	White	33	M	July 21, 1999	Augusta	Lethal injection	Leann Marion Whitlock	Jim Gilmore
69	Marlon DeWayne Williams	Black	26	M	August 17, 1999	Chesapeake City	Lethal injection	Helen Bedsole	Jim Gilmore
70	Everett Lee Mueller	White	51	M	September 16, 1999	Chesterfield	Lethal injection	Charity Powers	Jim Gilmore
71	Jason Matthew Joseph	Black	27	M	October 19, 1999	Portsmouth City	Lethal injection	Jeffrey Anderson	Jim Gilmore
72	Thomas Lee Royal Jr.	Black	32	M	November 9, 1999	Hampton City	Lethal injection	Hampton Police Officer Kenneth Wallace (Note: Also killed James William Smith Jr., but was executed for killing Wallace.)	Jim Gilmore
73	Andre Lee Graham	Black	29	M	December 9, 1999	Richmond City	Lethal injection	Sheryl Stack (Note: Also killed Richard Rosenbluth and Rebecca Rosenbluth, but was executed for killing Stack.)	Jim Gilmore
74	Douglas Christopher Thomas	White	26	M	January 10, 2000	Middlesex	Lethal injection	James Wiseman and Kathy Wiseman	Jim Gilmore
75	Steve Edward Roach	White	23	M	January 13, 2000	Greene	Lethal injection	Mary Ann Hughes	Jim Gilmore
76	Lonnie Weeks Jr.	Black	27	M	March 16, 2000	Hampton City	Lethal injection	Virginia State Trooper Jose Cavazos	Jim Gilmore
77	Michael David Clagett	White	39	M	July 6, 2000	Virginia Beach City	Electrocution	4 murder victims (Note: The 4 victims were: Lam Van Son, Wendell Parish Jr., Karen Sue Rounds, and Abdelaziz Gren.)	Jim Gilmore
78	Russel William Burket	White	32	M	August 30, 2000	Virginia Beach City	Lethal injection	Katherine Tafelski and Ashley Tafelski	Jim Gilmore
79	Derek Rocco Barnabei	White	33	M	September 14, 2000	Norfolk City	Lethal injection	Sarah Wisnosky	Jim Gilmore
80	Bobby Lee Ramdass	Black	28	M	October 10, 2000	Fairfax	Lethal injection	Mohammed Kayani (Note: Also killed Darrell Ferguson, but was executed for killing Kayani.)	Jim Gilmore
81	Christopher Cornelius Goins	Black	27	M	December 6, 2000	Richmond City	Lethal injection	5 murder victims (Note: The 5 victims were: Robert Jones, Nicole Jones, David Jones, Daphne Jones, and James Randolph.)	Jim Gilmore
82	Thomas Wayne Akers	White	31	M	March 1, 2001	Franklin	Lethal injection	Wesley Brant Smith	Jim Gilmore
83	Christopher James Beck	White	26	M	October 18, 2001	Arlington	Lethal injection	Florence Marie Marks, David Kaplan, and William Miller	Jim Gilmore
84	James Earl Patterson	White	35	M	March 13, 2002	Prince George	Lethal injection	Joyce Snead Aldridge	Mark Warner
85	Daniel Lee Zirkle	White	33	M	April 2, 2002	Page	Lethal injection	Christina Zirkle and Jessica Shiflett	Mark Warner
86	Walter Mickens Jr.	Black	47	M	June 12, 2002	Newport News City	Lethal injection	Timothy Jason Hall	Mark Warner
87	Mir Aimal Kasi	Asian	38	M	November 14, 2002	Fairfax	Lethal injection	Frank Darling and Lansing Bennett (Note: Although both victims were killed at the same time, Kansi was only sentenced to death and executed for killing Darling.)	Mark Warner
88	Earl Conrad Bramblett	White	61	M	April 9, 2003	Roanoke	Electrocution	4 murder victims (Note: The 4 victims were: William Blaine Hodges, Teresa Lynn Hodges, Winter Ashley Hodges, and Anah Michelle Hodges.)	Mark Warner
89	Bobby Wayne Swisher	White	27	M	July 22, 2003	Augusta	Lethal injection	Dawn McNees Snyder	Mark Warner
90	Brian Lee Cherrix	White	30	M	March 18, 2004	Accomack	Lethal injection	Tessa Van Hart	Mark Warner
91	Dennis Mitchell Orbe	White	39	M	March 31, 2004	York	Lethal injection	Richard Burnett	Mark Warner
92	Mark Wesley Bailey	White	34	M	July 22, 2004	Hampton City	Lethal injection	Katherine Bailey and Nathan Bailey	Mark Warner
93	James Bryant Hudson	White	56	M	August 18, 2004	Halifax	Lethal injection	Stanley Cole, Walter Cole, and Patsy Cole	Mark Warner
94	James Edward Reid	Black	58	M	September 9, 2004	Montgomery	Lethal injection	Annie Mae Lester	Mark Warner
95	Dexter Lee Vinson	Black	43	M	April 27, 2006	Halifax	Lethal injection	Angela Felton	Tim Kaine
96	Brandon Wayne Hedrick	White	27	M	July 20, 2006	Appomattox	Electrocution	Lisa Yvonne Crider	Tim Kaine
97	Michael William Lenz	White	42	M	July 27, 2006	Augusta	Lethal injection	Brent Parker	Tim Kaine
98	John Yancey Schmitt	White	33	M	November 9, 2006	Chesterfield	Lethal injection	Earl Shelton Dunning	Tim Kaine
99	Kevin Green	Black	31	M	May 27, 2008	Brunswick	Lethal injection	Patricia Vaughan	Tim Kaine
100	Robert Stacy Yarbrough	Black	30	M	June 25, 2008	Mecklenburg	Lethal injection	Cyril Hugh Hamby	Tim Kaine
101	Kent Jermaine Jackson	Black	26	M	July 10, 2008	Newport News City	Lethal injection	Beulah Mae Kaiser	Tim Kaine
102	Christopher Scott Emmett	White	36	M	July 24, 2008	Danville City	Lethal injection	John Fenton Langley	Tim Kaine
103	Edward Nathaniel Bell	Black	44	M	February 19, 2009	Winchester City	Lethal injection	Winchester Police Officer Ricky Timbrook	Tim Kaine
104	John Allen Muhammad	Black	48	M	November 10, 2009	Prince William	Lethal injection	16 murder victims (Note: The 16 victims were: James Martin, James Buchanan, Prem Kumar Walekar, Sarah Ramos, Lori Ann Lewis-Rivera, Conrad Johnson, Keenya Nicole Cook, Jerry Taylor, Billy Gene Dillon, Million Woldemariam, Claudine Parker, Hong Im Ballenger, Pascal Charlot, Dean Harold Meyers, Kenneth Bridges, and Linda Franklin. The first six victims were killed in Maryland. Of the other ten victims, Cook was killed in Washington, Taylor in Arizona, Dillon in Texas, Woldemariam in Georgia, Parker in Alabama, Ballenger in Louisiana, Charlot in Washington, D.C., and Meyers, Bridges, and Franklin in Virginia. Muhammad was executed for killing Meyers.)	Tim Kaine
105	Larry Bill Elliott	White	60	M	November 17, 2009	Prince William	Electrocution	Dana Thrall and Robert Finch	Tim Kaine
106	Paul Warner Powell	White	31	M	March 18, 2010	Prince William	Electrocution	Stacie Reed	Bob McDonnell
107	Darick Demorris Walker	Black	37	M	May 20, 2010	Henrico	Lethal injection	Stanley Beale and Clarence Elwood Threat	Bob McDonnell
108	Teresa Wilson Bean Lewis	White	41	F	September 23, 2010	Pittsylvania	Lethal injection	Julian Clifton Lewis Jr. and Charles Lewis	Bob McDonnell
109	Jerry Terrell Jackson	Black	30	M	August 18, 2011	Williamsburg City	Lethal injection	Ruth Phillips	Bob McDonnell
110	Robert Charles Gleason Jr.	White	42	M	January 16, 2013	Wise	Electrocution	Harvey Gray Watson Jr. and Aaron Alexander Cooper (Note: Also killed Michael Kent Jamerson, but was executed for killing Watson and Cooper.)	Bob McDonnell
111	Alfredo Rolando Prieto	Hispanic	49	M	October 1, 2015	Fairfax	Lethal injection	9 murder victims (Note: The 9 victims were: Veronica Lynn Jefferson, Warren Fulton III, Rachael Raver, Manuel Sermeno, Anthony Gianuzzi, Stacey Siegrist, Herbert Farley, Lula Mae Farley, and Yvette Woodruff. The first four victims were killed in Virginia, while the rest were killed in California. Prieto was executed for killing Fulton and Raver.)	Terry McAuliffe
112	Ricky Javon Gray	Black	39	M	January 18, 2017	Richmond City	Lethal injection	8 murder victims (Note: The 8 victims were: Treva Gray, Bryan Taber Harvey, Kathryn Elizabeth Harvey, Stella Ann Harvey, Ruby May Harvey, Percyell Tucker, Mary Baskerville-Tucker, and Ashley Baskerville. Gray was killed in Pennsylvania, while the rest were killed in Virginia. Gray was executed for killing Stella and Ruby.)	Terry McAuliffe
113	William Charles Morva	White	35	M	July 6, 2017	Montgomery (Note: Was tried and convicted in Washington County.)	Lethal injection	Montgomery Sheriff's Deputy Eric Sutphin and Derrick McFarland	Terry McAuliffe

== Demographics ==
Race
White	57	50%
Black	52	46%
Hispanic	3	3%
Asian	1	1%
Age
20–29	26	23%
30–39	58	51%
40–49	20	18%
50–59	7	6%
60–69	2	2%
Sex
Male	112	99%
Female	1	1%
Date of execution
1970–1979	0	0%
1980–1989	8	7%
1990–1999	65	58%
2000–2009	32	28%
2010–2019	8	7%
2020–2029	0	0%
Method
Lethal injection	82	73%
Electrocution	31	27%
Governor (Party)
Mills Godwin (R)	0	0%
John N. Dalton (R)	0	0%
Chuck Robb (D)	4	4%
Gerald Baliles (D)	4	4%
Douglas Wilder (D)	14	12%
George Allen (R)	24	21%
Jim Gilmore (R)	37	33%
Mark Warner (D)	11	10%
Tim Kaine (D)	11	10%
Bob McDonnell (R)	5	4%
Terry McAuliffe (D)	3	3%
Ralph Northam (D)	0	0%
Total	113	100%

== See also ==
- Capital punishment in the United States
- Capital punishment in Virginia
- List of people executed in Virginia (pre-1972) – executions before Furman
