= Murder of Leann Whitlock =

1990 kidnapping-murder of a university student in Virginia

Leann Whitlock
- Born: Leann Marion Whitlock; November 30, 1970; Roanoke, Virginia, U.S.
- Died: January 5, 1990 (aged 19); Augusta County, Virginia, U.S.
- Cause of death: Fatal assault wounds to the head
- Resting place: Williams Memorial Park
- Education: James Madison University (incomplete)
- Occupation: Student
- Known for: Kidnap and murder victim
- Parents: Ed Whitlock (father); Esther Whitlock (mother)

On January 5, 1990, in Harrisonburg, Virginia, 19-year-old Leann Marion Whitlock (November 30, 1970 – January 5, 1990), an African-American sophomore at James Madison University, was kidnapped by two men outside a shopping mall and later murdered by her abductors, Ronald Lee Henderson and Thomas "Tommy" David Strickler (August 5, 1965 – July 21, 1999), the latter of whom was the ringleader of the crime.

Strickler was arrested a week after the murder and convicted of robbery, kidnapping, and capital murder. He was sentenced to death. Henderson was arrested in Oregon six months later and extradited to Virginia, where he was convicted in a separate trial of first degree murder, kidnapping, and robbery and sentenced to three consecutive life terms. Strickler remained on death row for nine years before being executed by lethal injection on July 21, 1999.

== Murder ==
On January 5, 1990, a 19-year-old university student was abducted outside a shopping mall in Harrisonburg, Virginia, and was later found murdered in a secluded area in Augusta County, Virginia.

On that day, 19-year-old Leann Marion Whitlock, a sophomore student of James Madison University, was driving her boyfriend's car to the mall, where her boyfriend had a part-time job, after she dropped her roommate off at another place. Whitlock, who arrived at the mall and originally was supposed to return the car to her boyfriend, was approached by two men, 24-year-old Thomas David Strickler (better known as Tommy Strickler) and 23-year-old Ronald Lee Henderson, the former of whom aggressively forced Whitlock to remain in the car. the two men forcibly boarded the car, abducting Whitlock in turn and told her to drive off; the men's female companion, Donna Kay Tudor, also entered the car with both Strickler and Henderson. There were multiple witnesses to the kidnapping.

After the group arrived at a forested area in Augusta County, Whitlock was taken into the forest, where she was stripped naked and assaulted by both Henderson and Strickler. Afterwards, Whitlock was bludgeoned to death by Strickler, who threw a 69-pound rock on her head several times. The men subsequently drove off in the stolen car with Tudor (who did not join the assault and therefore unaware of the murder), and they also stole some of Whitlock's valuables, including her earrings, identification cards and wristwatch.

Whitlock's naked and frozen body was found eight days after she went missing. An autopsy report later showed that Whitlock died as a result of multiple blows to her head.

== Trial of Tommy Strickler ==
Tommy Strickler

A week after the murder of Leann Whitlock, Tommy Strickler was arrested along with Donna Tudor after he was seen driving the car of Whitlock's boyfriend. Strickler was charged with capital murder, robbery, and kidnapping, while Tudor was charged with grand larceny for the alleged theft of the car. Henderson, who was still at large at that point, was also charged in absentia with capital murder, robbery, and kidnapping. Under Virginia state law, the offense of capital murder carries the death penalty.

Strickler's trial began on June 18, 1990. It was adduced during the trial that an eyewitness had seen Strickler approaching Whitlock's car and forcing her into the vehicle shortly before the abduction. Another eyewitness had also seen Strickler driving the victim's car near Augusta County on the date of the abduction. Tudor, who received Whitlock's stolen earrings, testified in court that she overheard both Henderson and Strickler talking about killing an African-American woman, addressing her with a racial slur; Whitlock was African-American. The prosecution also argued that the death of Whitlock was the work of two persons, as it was more likely for either Henderson or Strickler to hold the victim down while the other threw the rock down and inflicted fatal blows to Whitlock's head. Augusta County Commonwealth's Attorney A. Lee Ervin, who prosecuted Strickler during the trial, reportedly described the murder of Leann Whitlock as "outrageously vile, horrible and inhuman", and admonished Strickler for his actions.

On June 21, 1990, an Augusta County jury found Strickler guilty of kidnapping, robbery and capital murder. The same jury also issued their decision on sentence: they recommended double sentences of life imprisonment for the abduction and robbery charges, and the death penalty for the capital murder charge. One of the jurors, Bill Ruch, stated that the jury were all in agreement that Strickler was indeed guilty of the murder of Leann Whitlock, and they believed that Strickler was the ringleader based on the trial evidence, and hence they settled on the death penalty for Strickler.

On September 18, 1990, 24-year-old Tommy David Strickler was formally sentenced to death by Augusta County Circuit Court Judge Thomas H. Wood. In the verdict, Judge Wood admonished Strickler for his callous attitude towards Whitlock's death, pointing out that he went to a local nightclub to party just about an hour after murdering her, and stated that there was no excuse for Strickler to commit murder, in spite of evidence of his troubled childhood and low IQ, stating that it was emotionally difficult to actually feel sympathy for Strickler in view of the multiple testimonies and evidence of the heinous crimes he committed.

Strickler was the second White person in Virginia to be sentenced to death for the murder of an African-American person; the first person was Wayne Kenneth DeLong, who killed an African-American police detective from Richmond in 1986, but DeLong committed suicide in June 1993, a month before his execution date of July 15, 1993.

== Trial of Ronald Henderson ==
On July 10, 1990, after being on the run for six months, 24-year-old Ronald Henderson was arrested in Oregon for the murder of Leann Whitlock, and an extradition order was approved in August 1990. Four months later, after he decided not to oppose extradition, Henderson was extradited back to Virginia to stand trial for his role in the murder.

On March 25, 1991, Henderson's trial was conducted before another Augusta County jury, with Judge Rudolph Bumgardner III presiding. The prosecution argued that Henderson should be convicted of the same charges of capital murder as his accomplice Tommy Strickler. They adduced the testimony of Kenneth Workman, who heard Henderson admitting while drunk that he and Strickler killed Whitlock, referring to her by a racial slur. They also called upon another key witness named Jeffrey Woods, who claimed he overheard Henderson admitting to another prisoner, Michael Wiseman, that he dropped a rock on Whitlock. The prosecution also presented evidence that Henderson had given Whitlock's stolen watch to a woman at a bar, which was confirmed to be true despite Henderson's denials. Overall, the prosecution rejected Henderson's denial of killing Whitlock, stating that he had reason to lie in order to avoid the death sentence and his statements contradicted the objective testimonies and evidence.

On the other hand, Henderson's lawyers argued that their client played a considerably smaller role than Strickler in the murder: Henderson confessed to the police that he indeed abducted and robbed Whitlock but he did not kill Whitlock, and he had tried to stop Strickler from killing her. The defense also argued that Woods's testimony could not be relied on since it was uncorroborated and the prosecution did not summon Wiseman to back up Woods's claims, and at the time of his testimony, Woods had several felony charges pending against him and he agreed to have some of the charges dropped in exchange for the testimony. They also cited that Workman himself was a convicted felon and his credibility should be approached with caution.

On March 27, 1991, the jury found Henderson not guilty of capital murder, but guilty of a lesser charge of first-degree murder. The verdict allowed Henderson to no longer face the death penalty. Instead, the jury recommended that Henderson should be sentenced to life in prison for charges of robbery, first-degree murder and kidnapping. Reportedly, Whitlock's parents were disappointed, as they wanted Henderson to face the death penalty like Strickler, but they stated they would accept the jury's decision. Whitlock's father commented that Henderson shared the same culpability as Strickler for causing his daughter's death.

On June 17, 1991, 25-year-old Ronald Lee Henderson was given three life sentences for kidnapping, robbery and first-degree murder.

== Strickler's execution ==
=== Appeals of Strickler ===
In February 1991, Tommy Strickler filed a direct appeal to the Virginia Supreme Court.

On April 19, 1991, the Virginia Supreme Court rejected Strickler's direct appeal against the death sentence. The Virginia Supreme Court justices stated in their ruling that even if an offender did not inflict the fatal blows in cases of murder committed by more than one person, the said offender is likewise guilty of murder. It was noted that the killing of Leann Whitlock was committed by two people and it was impossible for a lone killer to hold the victim down while at the same time lethally bringing the rock down on Whitlock, and Strickler was therefore held guilty for having jointly took part in the fatal beating and sharing the common intention with his accomplice to do so.

On January 13, 1995, Strickler's second appeal to the Virginia Supreme Court was likewise dismissed.

After exhausting his state appeals, Strickler was originally scheduled to be executed on November 9, 1995. However, two days before his tentative execution date, Strickler was granted a stay of execution by U.S. District Judge Robert R. Merhige to allow him more time to pursue federal appeals against his death sentence.

In another appeal hearing in October 1997, District Judge Merhige allowed the appeal of Strickler and reversed the conviction and sentence on the grounds that the prosecution had improperly withheld evidence during his trial, but the ruling was ultimately overturned by the 4th Circuit Court of Appeals in June 1998, and the same court thus restored both Strickler's death sentence and capital murder conviction.

Subsequently, Strickler's second death warrant was signed and his execution was re-scheduled to take place on September 16, 1998. However, on September 14, 1998, two days before the upcoming execution, the U.S. Supreme Court postponed Strickler's execution while pending an appeal. In October 1998, the U.S. Supreme Court agreed to hear the arguments of Strickler, who claimed that the prosecution unlawfully withheld evidence in his trial and sought a review of his conviction.

On June 17, 1999, Strickler's appeal was dismissed by the U.S. Supreme Court, after the Supreme Court found that Strickler did not raise tangible claims that he suffered sufficient prejudice from the prosecution’s failure to disclose the evidence that would affect the jury’s verdict.

=== Execution ===
After the U.S. Supreme Court rejected his final appeal, Strickler's death sentence was re-scheduled to be carried out on July 21, 1999. Strickler's counsel filed a last-minute appeal against the execution to the U.S. District Court for the Eastern District of Virginia. The lawyers argued that the execution should be stayed in favor of a new trial for Strickler, because the real killer was not Strickler but Henderson, claiming that there was a letter written by the key witness Donna Kay Tudor, in which she allegedly admitted to lying and falsely accusing Strickler as the murderer. However, District Judge Robert E. Payne declined to rule on the case by asserting he had no jurisdiction to decide on the motion. Also, a handwriting expert confirmed that the handwriting inside the possible letter of Tudor did not match to her own handwriting.

On July 20, 1999, the eve of Strickler's execution, the 4th U.S. Circuit Court of Appeals rejected a follow-up appeal from Strickler.

On July 21, 1999, the same date of Strickler's scheduled execution, the U.S. Supreme Court denied his final appeal, and the Virginia governor Jim Gilmore simultaneously dismissed Strickler's clemency petition. Hours after the dismissal of his final appeals, 33-year-old Thomas David Strickler was put to death by lethal injection at the Greensville Correctional Center. In his last statement, Strickler continued to maintain he was innocent, and stated that he loved his family. He was pronounced dead at 9.05pm after the drugs were administered to him.

Strickler was one of the first few people to be executed in Virginia for the murder of an African-American person. In the U.S., it was extremely rare for White people to face capital punishment for murdering victims of African-American descent, and Strickler was one of only 21 people who were executed in the U.S. for such offenses as of 2025.

== Henderson's incarceration ==
After the end of his sentencing, Ronald Henderson was incarcerated at the Buckingham Correctional Center, where he is currently serving his life sentences as of 2025.

In August 1993, about two years after Henderson's sentencing, the surviving kin of Leann Whitlock were notified that Ronald Henderson would be released after receiving parole, which shocked the family as they expected Henderson to not be paroled and locked away for life for murdering Whitlock. However, it was subsequently discovered in the end that the Ronald Henderson who received parole was actually "Ronald Bernard Henderson", an African-American man convicted of cocaine possession, while the Ronald Henderson involved in Whitlock's murder was White and would not be eligible for parole until 2007. At the time of the notification error, there were four people named Ronald Henderson (including the co-offender of the Whitlock murder case) held in judicial custody under the Virginia prison system.

Throughout his imprisonment, Henderson was assessed for parole at least ten times based on available parole records, the earliest dated in September 2011, when Henderson was denied parole. Throughout the 2010s, Henderson's parole hearings ended with rejection in October 2012, August 2014, August 2016, November 2017, and October 2018 respectively.

In the 2020s, Henderson was denied parole in October 2020, August 2021, August 2022, October 2023, and August 2024 respectively.

== See also ==
- Capital punishment in Virginia
- List of people executed in Virginia
- List of people executed in the United States in 1999
- List of solved missing person cases: 1950–1999
- List of white defendants executed for killing a black victim
- Race and capital punishment in the United States
