= Dennis Wayne Eaton =

American convicted mass murderer (1957–1998)

- 1998 mugshot of Eaton
- Born: June 4, 1957; Rockingham County, Virginia, U.S.
- Died: June 18, 1998 (aged 41); Greensville Correctional Center, Virginia, U.S.
- Status: Executed by lethal injection
- Convictions: Capital murder (x2); First-degree murder (x2); Robbery; Breaking and entering Illegal use of a firearm Grand larceny
- Penalty: Death (January 11, 1990)

Details
- Victims: 4
- Date: February 20, 1989
- Location: Virginia
- Imprisoned at: Mecklenburg Correctional Center

Dennis Wayne Eaton (June 7, 1957 – June 18, 1998) was an American convicted mass murderer convicted of killing a police officer and three other people in Virginia in 1989. On February 20, 1989, motivated by intentions of jealousy and robbery, Eaton conducted a series of shootings that led to the four murders. Firstly, Eaton gunned down his roommate Walter Custer Jr. before he killed his next-door neighbour Ripley Marston via shooting. After murdering both Custer and Marston, Eaton fled south together with his girlfriend in Marston's car, and during the journey, Eaton also killed state trooper Jerry Hines, before he subsequently crashed his car into a telephone pole while avoiding a subsequent police chase through Salem. As the police cornered the couple, Eaton fatally shot his girlfriend Judy Ann McDonald and attempted to turn the gun on himself, but he survived his headshot wound with medical treatment and was thus charged with the four murders.

Eaton was put on trial for all the four murders, which took place across two different counties (Shenandoah County and Rockbridge County). Eaton was sentenced to triple life terms without parole for the murders of Marston, McDonald and Custer in separate trials held between September and October 1989. For the fourth crime of murdering Hines, however, Eaton was found guilty of capital murder and sentenced to death on January 9, 1990. Ten years after the killings, Eaton was put to death by lethal injection on June 18, 1998, after losing his appeals against the death sentence.

== Early life ==
Dennis Wayne Eaton, the youngest of ten children, was born in Virginia in 1957. Eaton, who dropped out of Stonewall Jackson High School at the ninth grade, had over 30 previous convictions of petty offences, ranging from theft and marijuana possession, since the mid-1970s before his 1989 conviction for murder. According to Eaton's neighbors, he was said to have a good-hearted personality, and sources revealed that in his adulthood, Eaton was the only child out of his family to care for his ailing mother, who was recovering from surgery on the same date Eaton was arrested for murder. At the time of his arrest, Eaton was working at an orchard.

== 1989 murder spree ==
On February 20, 1989, 32-year-old Dennis Wayne Eaton carried out an eight-hour shooting spree that left four people dead in Virginia.

Firstly, in Shenandoah County, Virginia, where he shared a mobile home with his girlfriend and roommate, Eaton shot and murdered his 26-year-old roommate, Walter "Nooner" Custer Jr., supposedly out of jealousy that he and Eaton's girlfriend shared a relationship between themselves. Eaton later proceeded to the house of his 68-year-old neighbour, Ripley Elwood Marston Sr., where he also gunned down Marston before he stole both Marston's wallet and car. Eaton and his 24-year-old girlfriend, Judy Ann McDonald, the latter who drove the car, fled the scene together and headed south.

As the couple drove into Rockbridge County, at about 11:30pm, they caught the attention of Jerry Hines, a 48-year-old police officer and state trooper, who suspected that the couple were drink driving while he was in midst of his patrol at Interstate 81. Hines attempted to make the couple pull over, but in midst of his encounter with the couple, Hines was shot twice by Eaton and he died at the scene. The body of Hines was found by another trooper Allen K. Golleher Jr., who earlier received a call for assistance from Hines regarding a traffic incident involving both Eaton and McDonald. An autopsy report revealed that one of the shots penetrated the chest through the right armpit of Hines, which in turn, lethally penetrated the lung and heart, while the other shot went through Hines's neck and reached the windpipe, which could also in the ordinary course of nature to cause death.

Shortly after the murder of Hines, the couple were pursued by several police officers in midst of fleeing the murder site. However, the couple crashed the car onto a telephone pole as the pursuit extended to Salem, Virginia. As the police officers cornered the couple, Eaton, in an attempt to avoid capture, shot McDonald first before he turned the gun on himself, shooting himself once in the head. However, only McDonald died at the scene, and despite being in critical condition, Eaton survived with timely medical treatment, and he was thus taken into custody for all four murders. Reports showed that during the surgery to treat Eaton's head injury, the doctors had to remove the right eyeball of Eaton due to the severity of the wound.

In the aftermath, the funeral of Hines was held at Collierstown on February 23, 1989, with many policemen attending the wake. Initially, the murder count was officiated at three, mainly Hines, Marston and McDonald, before the victim count was corrected to four, after the body of Custer was found at a nearby apple orchard days after his murder.

== Trials and sentencing ==
Murder charges

After his arrest, Dennis Eaton was charged with multiple counts of murder and firearm-related offences. The most serious was a capital murder charge, which, under Virginia law, carries the possibility of life imprisonment or the death penalty upon conviction. Eaton was confined in a mental hospital while awaiting his trial to reduce the possibility of him committing suicide before trial. Additionally, in March 1989, the defence sought a competency hearing to determine if Eaton was mentally fit to stand trial for all the four murders he committed.

McDonald

On September 27, 1989, Eaton pleaded guilty to the first-degree murder of Judy McDonald. He was thus sentenced to life in prison for the crime.

Marston and Custer

On October 13, 1989, Eaton pleaded guilty in a second trial for both the murders of Walter Custer Jr. and Ripley Marston. As part of a plea deal to take the death penalty off the table, Eaton was sentenced to two consecutive life sentences without the possibility of parole for the capital murder of Marston and first-degree murder of Custer. A third life term was also added to the sentence for robbery, in addition to 44 years for breaking and entering, illegal use of a firearm and grand larceny.

Hines

Eaton's third murder trial for the capital murder of Jerry Hines was scheduled to take place on November 27, 1989. The trial venue was changed from Rockbridge County to Warrenton in Fauquier County. Jury selection concluded on November 28, 1989.

During the trial itself, Chadwick J. Holley, a fellow prisoner of Eaton who was held on drug charges, testified that while he shared the same cell as Eaton, he heard the latter confessing to being the shooter who murdered Hines, as well as the other three victims. However, Eaton denied that he ever confessed to killing Hines per Holley's testimony, and claimed that it was Judy who was the triggerman responsible for the death of Hines.

On November 30, 1989, Eaton was found guilty of capital murder pertaining to the fatal shooting of Hines.

On December 11, 1989, the jury unanimously recommended the death penalty for the capital murder of Hines.

On January 11, 1990, 33-year-old Dennis Wayne Eaton was formally sentenced to death by Rockbridge County Circuit Judge George Honts.

== Eaton's appeals and execution ==
=== Appellate process ===
On September 21, 1990, the Virginia Supreme Court rejected Dennis Eaton's appeal against his death sentence and conviction for the murder of Jerry Hines.

On October 31, 1994, Eaton's appeal was denied by the U.S. Supreme Court.

On March 24, 1998, the 4th Circuit Court of Appeals rejected the appeal of Eaton.

In April 1998, Eaton's final appeal was dismissed by the U.S. Supreme Court.

=== Execution and aftermath ===
After exhausting his appeals in 1998, Dennis Eaton's death warrant was signed and his execution date was set for June 18, 1998. During the final week leading up to Eaton's execution, the sister of the murdered trooper Jerry Hines appealed to the governor for clemency, stating that the execution of her brother's killer would not bring her closure and that she forgave Eaton for murdering her brother. Hines's sister, also a former nun, requested to become the spiritual adviser of Eaton in the execution chamber, but her request was denied.

On June 18, 1998, 41-year-old Dennis Wayne Eaton was put to death by lethal injection at the Greensville Correctional Center. In his last words, Eaton said, "I'd like to say that I'm sorry. I'd like to thank my brothers and sisters at State Church. I love you all so much. Mom, I love you." Hines's widow and one of Hines's sons, as well as three family members of one of Eaton's other three victims reportedly attended the execution as witnesses.

== See also ==
- Capital punishment in Virginia
- List of people executed in Virginia
- List of people executed in the United States in 1998
