= Robert Gleason (murderer) =

American serial killer

- Gleason in 2010
- Born: April 10, 1970; Lowell, Massachusetts, U.S.
- Died: January 16, 2013 (aged 42); Greensville Correctional Center, Virginia, U.S.
- Status: Executed by electrocution
- Convictions: Capital murder (2 counts); First degree murder Use of a firearm in the commission of a felony
- Penalty: Life imprisonment (2008); Death (September 6, 2011)

Details
- Victims: 3+
- Span of crimes: 2007 – 2010 (confirmed murders)
- Country: United States
- State: Virginia

Robert Charles Gleason Jr. (April 10, 1970 – January 16, 2013) was an American serial killer and tattoo artist who was sentenced to death and executed in Virginia for the murder of two of his cellmates. Gleason, who was already serving a life sentence for another murder, was an execution volunteer who vowed to continue killing in prison if he was not put to death. Capital punishment was abolished in Virginia on March 24, 2021, officially making Gleason the last person to be executed in Virginia by electrocution.

== Crimes and sentencing ==
In 2008, Gleason was sentenced to life in prison for the 2007 murder of Michael Kent Jamerson (March 13, 1953 – May 8, 2007) in Amherst County, Virginia. Gleason murdered Jamerson to cover up his involvement in a drug gang. In 2009, while serving a life sentence at Wallens Ridge State Prison, Gleason had become frustrated with the Department of Corrections because they refused to move out his new, severely mentally ill cellmate, Harvey Gray Watson (September 11, 1945 – May 8, 2009). Watson was serving a 100-year sentence for a shooting spree on August 11, 1983, which resulted in one death and three injuries. He had also been previously acquitted of shooting and killing an intruder at his store in 1974. Gleason hog-tied, beat and strangled 63-year-old Watson on May 8, 2009, the second anniversary of Jamerson's death. Gleason pleaded guilty. In court and media interviews, Gleason vowed to continue killing if not given a death sentence.

Gleason also claimed to have killed other people before his incarceration for Jamerson's murder. He said he was paid to kill some of the alleged victims, while he killed others for angering him.

While awaiting sentencing at Red Onion State Prison, a highly secure prison for the state's most dangerous inmates, Gleason strangled 26-year-old Aaron Cooper (September 27, 1983 – July 28, 2010) through wire fencing that separated their individual cages in a prison yard on July 28, 2010. Cooper had been serving a 34-year sentence for robbery. Gleason was subsequently sentenced to death, voluntarily waived his appeals, and received his request. He chose the electric chair over lethal injection.

== Execution ==
Gleason was executed by electric chair at Greensville Correctional Center in Jarratt, Virginia, on January 16, 2013, at 9:08 p.m. He was the first person executed in the United States in 2013. He had a last meal that he wanted kept secret. His last words were purportedly, "Well, I hope Percy ain't going to forget to wet the sponge. Put me on the highway to Jackson and call my Irish buddies. Póg mo thóin. God bless." The phrase "Póg mo thóin," is translated from Irish as "Kiss my arse." His execution was the first to be carried out by electric chair since the March 2010 execution of Paul Warner Powell, also in Virginia. Gleason stands as the last person to die in the Virginia electric chair, the last person to die in the electric chair in any jurisdiction for almost six years until the November 2018 execution of Edmund Zagorski in Tennessee, and the most recent person executed by electrocution in a jurisdiction other than the state of Tennessee.

== Capital punishment debate ==
In 2021, Gleason's case was referred to when a bill was brought forth to end capital punishment in Virginia. Supporters of capital punishment referenced Gleason's case as an example of why Virginia should continue the practice, pointing out that Gleason had continued to kill while he was behind bars, and would have continued to do so had he not been executed. Advocates of capital punishment argued that executing Gleason had saved lives and that death was the appropriate sentence for people like Gleason.

On March 24, 2021, capital punishment was abolished in Virginia, officially making Gleason the last person to be executed in Virginia by electrocution.

== See also ==
- List of people executed in Virginia
- List of people executed in the United States in 2013
- List of serial killers in the United States
- List of white defendants executed for killing a black victim
- Race and capital punishment in the United States
- Volunteer (capital punishment)
- List of people executed by electrocution

Executions carried out in Virginia
Preceded by Jerry Terrell Jackson August 18, 2011	Robert Charles Gleason Jr. January 16, 2013	Succeeded by Alfredo Rolando Prieto October 1, 2015
Executions carried out in the United States
Preceded by Manuel Pardo Jr. – Florida December 11, 2012	Robert Charles Gleason Jr. – Virginia; January 16, 2013	Succeeded by Carl Henry Blue – Texas February 21, 2013
White defendants executed for killing a black victim in the United States
Preceded by Cleve Foster – Texas September 25, 2012	Robert Charles Glesason Jr. – Virginia; January 16, 2013	Succeeded by Frederick Treesh – Ohio March 6, 2013
