= Roger Keith Coleman =

American murderer (1958-1992)

- Born: November 1, 1958; Grundy, Virginia, U.S.
- Died: May 20, 1992 (aged 33); Greensville Correctional Center, Virginia, U.S.
- Status: Executed by electrocution
- Convictions: Capital murder Rape; Attempted rape
- Penalty: Death

Roger Keith Coleman (November 1, 1958 – May 20, 1992) was an American convicted murderer and rapist who was executed on May 20, 1992, for the rape and murder of his 19-year-old sister-in-law, Wanda Faye McCoy, at her home in Grundy, Virginia, on the night of March 10, 1981. A lifelong resident of Grundy, Coleman had worked as a coal miner.

Coleman had a history of sexual misconduct and crime dating back to adolescence. In 1972, at age thirteen, he was brought before juvenile court for making obscene phone calls to his female classmates. He later received a three-year prison sentence for the attempted rape of a local woman in 1977 and was paroled in 1979. After his release, he was a suspect in an indecent exposure incident at the Buchanan County Public Library in January 1981. Though he was never charged for this crime, the librarians positively identified Coleman after his arrest for the murder of his sister-in-law. Suspicion quickly fell upon Coleman for McCoy's murder, given his criminal record and the discovery that he had reported for work that day but had left after his shift was dismissed for the evening. Coleman was unable to provide a clear alibi for his whereabouts during the time frame of the crime and as the investigation continued, he was subsequently arrested and brought to trial. He was convicted of the crimes and sentenced to death in 1982.

After his conviction, Coleman would become known nationally and internationally to death penalty opponents, who seized upon his claims of injustice by the legal system and brought considerable media attention to the case. Coleman's case was discussed on major television shows such as Good Morning America, Larry King Live, Nightline, Phil Donahue Show, and Today. Major publications including the New York Times, Time, and the Washington Post also covered the case. Despite multiple appeals and attempts to win a new trial, his sentence was carried out in 1992 amid a storm of national and international media attention and protests. Coleman maintained his innocence throughout his incarceration and eventual execution.

Coleman's case drew national and worldwide attention before and after his execution because of his repeated claims of innocence. Appeals were supported by the anti-death penalty movement. After his death, his was the second case nationally in which DNA evidence was analyzed of an executed man. In January 2006, Virginia Governor Mark Warner announced that testing of DNA evidence had conclusively proven that Coleman was guilty.

== Crimes ==
On April 7, 1977, Coleman knocked on the door to Brenda Rife's home in Grundy and asked for a glass of water, after falsely claiming to be helping the cleanup crews aiding the recovery from catastrophic flooding three days prior. After she allowed him in, Coleman produced a gun and forced her to tie up her six-year-old daughter. He then walked Rife upstairs to her bedroom at gunpoint, where he ordered her to undress. When she refused, Coleman ripped open her bathrobe, threw her on the bed, and clambered on top of her. Rife scratched him on the neck and managed to escape. She then freed her daughter and ran from the house. Coleman chased them and tried to force them back inside. Rife grabbed Coleman's gun and threw it under the porch while screaming for help. As neighbors responded, Coleman fled. He was later convicted of attempted rape and sentenced to three years in prison.

In January 1981, Coleman allegedly exposed himself and masturbated in front of two librarians, Patricia Hatfield and Jean Gilbert, at a public library. The two women did not know Coleman, but Hatfield encouraged Gilbert, an artist, to draw his face. After showing a police officer the sketch, he suggested that the perpetrator might have been Coleman and encouraged her to check a high school yearbook to see if the faces matched. Although Hatfield said the pictures appeared to be a clear match, the police ignored the incident.

Wanda McCoy, 19, was attacked in her home in Grundy on March 10, 1981. She was raped, stabbed to death, and nearly beheaded from severe neck wounds. As there was no sign of a struggle, police believed that she had allowed her attacker into the house.

Coleman, her sister's husband, had access to the house and was quickly considered a suspect due to his prior convictions. Coleman had reported to work that night but left after his shift was dismissed.

Physical evidence at the McCoy house included a fingerprint on the front screen door, a pry mark on the front door molding, and bloodstains inside the house. The victim had broken fingernails; cuts on her hands; and a dark, dusty substance on her body. Flecks of blood found on Coleman's pants were determined to be the same blood type as the victim's. At the time, DNA testing was not available.

== Case ==
At trial in 1982, Coleman was convicted of the rape and capital murder of McCoy.

The prosecution for the case, led by Commonwealth Attorney Michael McGlothlin, asserted:

- The lack of forced entry showed that McCoy knew her attacker
- Coleman had been previously convicted of attempted rape
- A hair found on McCoy's body was determined to be similar to Coleman's
- Blood found on Coleman's clothes was McCoy's blood type
- A fellow prisoner said that Coleman had privately confessed the crime to him

Coleman's defense maintained:

- The pry mark on the door indicated forced entry
- Forensic tests of the semen found on the victim's body implicated more than one person
- The prosecution said that there was no struggle, but the victim had cuts, a bruise in her arm, and broken fingernails

== State appeals ==
Coleman's initial appeal in 1983 to the Virginia Supreme Court was denied, and the United States Supreme Court denied certiorari. Coleman filed a petition for a writ of habeas corpus in the Circuit Court for Buchanan County, Virginia, raising several federal constitutional claims for the first time. A two-day evidentiary hearing was held, and the court denied all of Coleman's claims. On September 4, 1986, the court entered its final judgment.

Coleman appealed to the Virginia Supreme Court, but the appeal was dismissed on the motion of the Commonwealth since his notice of appeal had not been filed in time. The Virginia Supreme Court requires for a notice of appeal to be filed within 30 days of entry of the final judgment. Coleman's notice of appeal was filed on October 7, which was 33 days after the circuit court had entered its judgment.

== Federal petition for habeas corpus ==
Coleman petitioned in the United States District Court for the Western District of Virginia for a writ of habeas corpus. However, federal courts may generally not review a state court's denial of a federal constitutional claim if the denial is based on a state procedural default that is both independent of the federal claim and sufficient to support the prisoner's continued custody. Since Coleman was in procedural default of his appeal in state court, that was independent of his federal constitutional claims. That was considered adequate to support his continued custody, and he was ineligible for relief in a federal habeas corpus proceeding. Although finding that Coleman was in procedural default, the District Court addressed all of his claims and found them without merit. The United States Court of Appeals for the Fourth Circuit affirmed the District Court's ruling, as did the US Supreme Court in 1991.

== Controversy and execution ==
In 1990, Coleman's DNA was tested. He was found to be within the 2% of the population who could have committed the crime. Some argued that DNA and blood tests combined reduced this figure to 0.2%.

While he was on death row, Coleman continued to claim his innocence. Because of increasing efforts by opponents of the death penalty in the United States, an international audience became interested in his case. Time magazine featured Coleman on its May 18, 1992, cover. Virginia Governor Douglas Wilder received 13,000 calls and letters about Coleman from around the world, nearly all in favor of clemency. Wilder arranged a secret last-minute polygraph test for Coleman, who failed.

Coleman was executed May 20, 1992, by electric chair. He shared his final meal with James McCloskey, executive director of Centurion Ministries, a group that had been working to prove Coleman's innocence. His final words were:

An innocent man is going to be murdered tonight. When my innocence is proven, I hope America will realize the injustice of the death penalty as all other civilized countries have. My last words are to the woman I love. Love is eternal. My love for you will last forever. I love you, Sharon. (Sharon Paul was a college student and the girlfriend of Coleman whom he had met by mail during prison.)

In 1998, Chicago lawyer John C. Tucker published May God Have Mercy (ISBN 0-385-33294-7), detailing his efforts to save Coleman from execution.

== DNA testing post-execution ==
Centurion Ministries and four newspapers, including the Washington Post, sought to have DNA evidence from the case re-examined in 2000. That year was the first instance of a court ordering DNA testing of a man who had been executed for rape and murder: Ellis Wayne Felker in Georgia. The results were inconclusive.

In 2002, the Supreme Court of Virginia declined the request. Centurion Ministries subsequently appealed to Virginia Governor Mark Warner.

On January 5, 2006, Warner ordered the retesting of Coleman's DNA evidence, which was sent to the Centre of Forensic Sciences in Toronto, Canada. It determined that his DNA matched that of semen found at the crime scene, with no exclusions, and that there was only a 1-in-19-million chance of a random match. On January 12, 2006, Warner's office announced that the test results conclusively confirmed Coleman's guilt.

== Aftermath ==
Supporters who believed in Coleman's innocence had expected DNA tests to exonerate him, but they were profoundly disappointed. Some death penalty opponents had believed that evidence of an innocent man's execution would have a major impact on the death penalty debate in the United States, as some people on death row had been known to be exonerated. If Coleman had been proven innocent, it likely would have contributed to anti-death penalty support. Death penalty supporters were able to argue that Coleman's case showed that the criminal justice system was functioning in having guilty people convicted and executed, which severely dampened moves to abolish capital punishment.

== See also ==
- Capital punishment in Virginia
- Capital punishment in the United States
- List of people executed in Virginia
- List of people executed in the United States in 1992

Executions carried out in Virginia
Preceded by Derrick Lyon Patterson December 22, 1991	Roger Keith Coleman; May 20, 1992	Succeeded by Edward B.Fitzgerald Sr. July 23, 1992
Executions carried out in the United States
Preceded by Jesus Romero Jr. – Texas May 20, 1992	Roger Keith Coleman – Virginia; May 20, 1992	Succeeded by Robert Vannoy Black Jr.– Texas May 22, 1992
