= William Morva =

American murderer (1982–2017)

- Morva's booking photo
- Born: February 9, 1982; Midlothian, Virginia, U.S.
- Died: July 6, 2017 (aged 35); Greensville Correctional Center, Virginia, U.S.
- Known for: Last person to be executed by the Commonwealth of Virginia
- Status: Executed by lethal injection
- Motive: Delusions
- Convictions: Capital murder (3 counts), (Note: Morva killed two people, but a third count of capital murder was added for the murder of multiple people.) attempting to commit murder with a firearm
- Penalty: Death

Details
- Date: August 20–21, 2006
- Country: United States
- State: Virginia
- Killed: Eric Sutphin, 40; Derrick McFarland, 32
- Weapon: Stolen Glock .40 S&W semi-automatic pistol

William Charles Morva (February 9, 1982 – July 6, 2017) was an Hungarian-American man convicted of the 2006 shooting deaths of Sheriff's Deputy Corporal Eric Sutphin, 40, and hospital security guard Derrick McFarland, 32, in the town of Blacksburg, Virginia. He was sentenced to death for the crime and was executed on July 6, 2017. Morva was the last inmate to be executed by the Commonwealth of Virginia before capital punishment in the state was abolished on March 24, 2021.

The shooting deaths occurred near the university campus of Virginia Tech while he awaited trial for attempted armed robbery. A jury sentenced him to death on June 23, 2008, but he was diagnosed after the trial as having serious mental illnesses, a delusional disorder that caused him to kill. Judge Ray Grubbs initially set the execution date for October 21, 2008. On June 4, 2009, an appeal for William Morva was made to the Virginia Supreme Court. However, the capital murder conviction and death sentence were confirmed on September 18, 2009.

The United States Supreme Court declined to review the case in February 2017. Subsequently, Judge Robert Turk set the execution date for July 6, 2017. On June 20, 2017, Morva's lawyers, on his behalf, filed a request for clemency with Virginia Governor Terry McAuliffe. They requested that Governor McAuliffe, in light of evidence concerning Morva's true mental state, commute his sentence from death to life in prison without the possibility of parole. They also urged the Governor to ensure that Morva receive treatment with anti-psychotic drugs. Since Morva's lawyers filed his clemency petition, several local and international groups and 28 Virginia lawmakers called on Governor McAuliffe to halt the execution of Morva. The daughter of sheriff's deputy Sutphin, one of the two men slain by Morva, expressed her support for his clemency petition and asked the Governor to spare his life.

Despite the efforts of Morva's lawyers, and many supporters locally and internationally, Governor McAuliffe declined to grant Morva's clemency. Morva was being held at the Greensville Correctional Center, in Jarratt, Virginia. Morva's lawyers released a statement on the Governor's decision. They stated that, although Morva lost his battle for clemency, "they hope by improving access to proper evaluation and treatment for persons living with severe mental illness, we can avoid future tragedies." Morva was executed by the Commonwealth of Virginia and pronounced dead at 9:15 p.m. on July 6, 2017. He had no last words. The drug cocktail used for the execution was "a controversial lethal injection formula that may have subjected the last prisoner to be executed by the state to an excruciating death equivalent to drowning."

== Early years ==
William Morva lived near Midlothian, Virginia, until his father, Charles, retired and moved the family to Blacksburg. Charles Morva worked as a substitute teacher at Blacksburg High School and barista at a local coffee shop until moving back to the Richmond area with his wife Elizabeth.

Christina Gardner, who attended high school with Morva, reported that he had a difficult relationship with his father. In 2000, he dropped out of high school and subsequently became a fixture in the Virginia Tech community.

In April 2004, Charles Morva died of cancer. His son's friends believe he did not know how to deal with his father's death and observed a spiraling decline in his behavior. Before his arrest in 2005, William Morva had garnered a reputation as a drifter. A self-professed survivalist, he was almost always without shoes, ate only raw meat, berries, and pine cones, and spoke of spending nights in the woods around Blacksburg. Many who knew him began questioning his mental state.

== Blacksburg shootings ==
On August 18, 2005, William Morva and another young man, both armed and wearing masks, approached the Blacksburg Deli Mart but left because the store was closed and locked. The clerk, still inside, phoned the police. The Blacksburg police later that night arrested Morva for attempted armed robbery.

A year later, while in jail awaiting trial, Morva was taken to Montgomery Regional Hospital on August 20, 2006, for a sprained ankle and wrist. After using a hospital bathroom, he knocked deputy Russell Quesenberry unconscious using a metal toilet-paper container. He took the deputy's gun and shot Derrick McFarland, a hospital security guard running to the deputy's aid. McFarland died from his wounds.

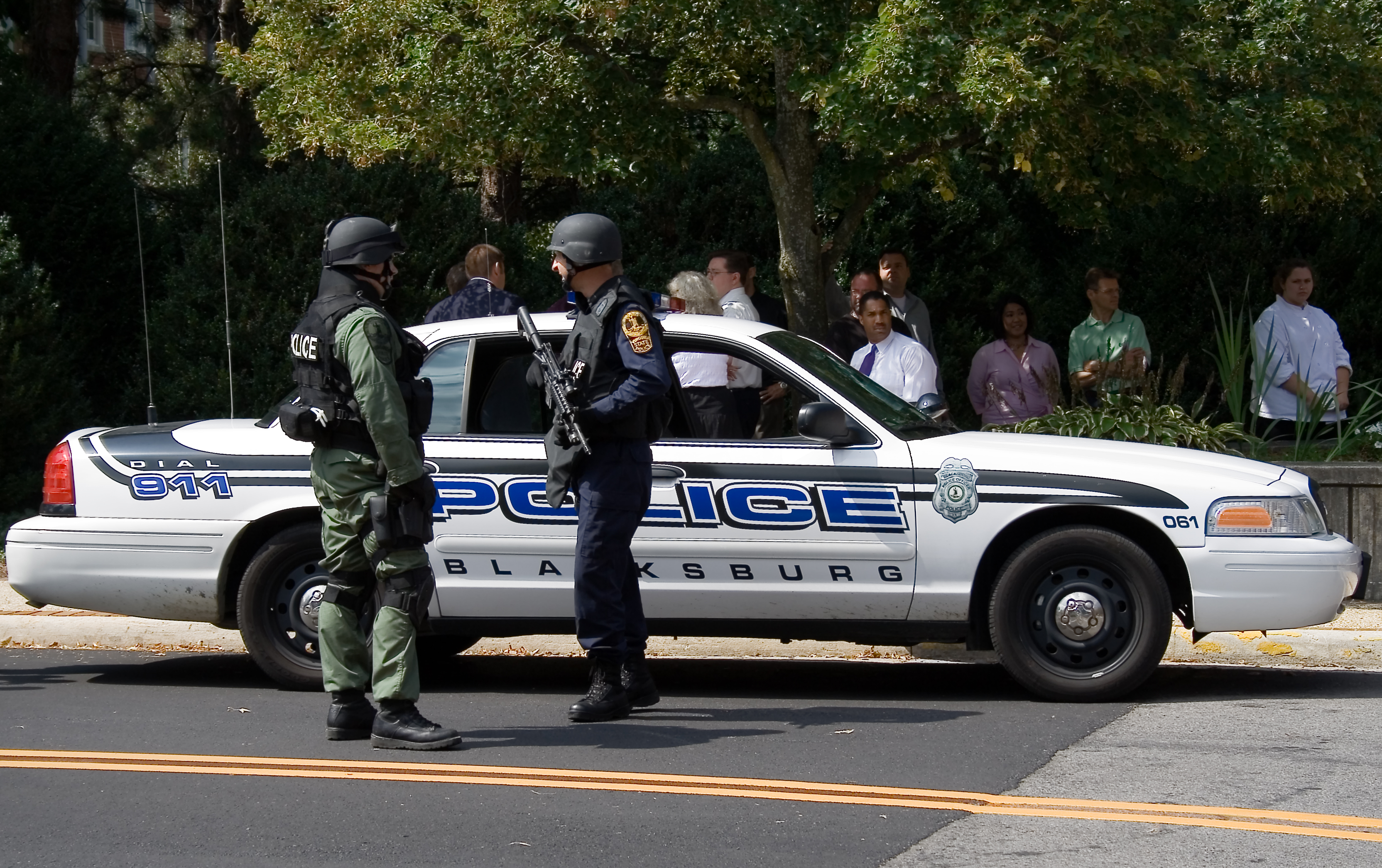
Police at Virginia Tech in Blacksburg, Virginia, responding to a report of William Charles Morva being seen in the area.

This initiated a manhunt for Morva, who, on the morning of August 21, 2006, shot and killed Montgomery County sheriff's deputy Cpl. Eric Sutphin on the Huckleberry Trail near the Virginia Tech Campus. Sutphin had been an officer for 13 years and had survived a prior shooting in May 2003, which killed Officer Scott Hylton, leading Sutphin to quit the police force. Sutphin returned, however, after just six months away despite making much more money as a modular home salesman. He was survived by his wife Tamara and his nine-year-old twin daughters.

Virginia Tech canceled classes and closed campus. He was later captured, shirtless and shoeless, approximately at 3:30 p.m. EDT, August 21, 2006, and taken into custody after being found hiding in a briar patch about 150 yards from where Sutphin was fatally shot.

== Legal proceedings ==
On August 29, 2006, Commonwealth's Attorney Brad Finch announced that William Morva would be charged with capital murder and use of a firearm in the shooting death of McFarland. A second capital murder charge would be sought in the shooting death of Sutphin, to be decided on at the grand jury meeting on October 10, 2006. Finch stated that he would seek the death penalty for Morva.

Morva's defense attorney requested a change of the trial location for Morva's original robbery charges. The trial was to be held at Montgomery County Circuit Court, but Morva's attorneys argued it would be impossible to find an impartial jury in Montgomery County due to the publicity Morva received since his escape and the subsequent murders. Morva's attorney stated, "I don't think there (have) been this many cases that have gotten nearly as much attention."

Morva's trial hearings began September 17, 2007, in Montgomery County for three counts of capital murder and one count of attempting to commit murder with a firearm. The third count of capital murder resulted from killing two people in less than three years, a capital offense in Virginia. On September 20, Judge Ray Grubbs ruled, following a jury selection process in which 45 prospective jurors were dismissed for cause, that the trial could not be held in Montgomery County.

On March 13, 2008, Morva was sentenced to death in an Abingdon, Virginia, court.

He made an appeal in June 2009 to the Supreme Court of Virginia. On September 18, 2009, the Supreme Court of Virginia affirmed Morva's convictions and death sentences in a 5–2 decision. The Virginia Supreme Court rejected the defense's claim that he should have been allowed to present an expert's testimony on whether he would endanger guards or fellow inmates if the jury sentenced him to life in prison without parole. On July 24, 2009, he was called to appear in Christiansburg by video conferencing to testify for the defense in a trial for his brother Michael Morva, who was charged with helping him escape from the Montgomery County Jail nearly three years before. This trial was delayed, and William Morva was expected to testify in a later trial.

In October 2010, the U.S. Supreme Court denied Morva's appeal.

On April 12, 2013, the Supreme Court of Virginia issued a published order dismissing Morva's petition for habeas corpus that challenged his convictions for capital murder. The court's opinion was handed on April 18, 2013.

On April 15, 2015, U.S. District Judge Michael Urbanski dismissed Morva's federal appeal.

On May 5, 2016, a federal appeals court rejected another appeal by Morva.

On February 21, 2017, The United States Supreme Court declined to hear the appeal. On May 9, 2017, as per a request by Virginia Attorney General Mark Herring four days prior, Morva's execution date was set for Thursday, July 6, 2017.

On June 20, 2017, Morva's lawyers filed his clemency request with Virginia Governor Terry McAuliffe. They petitioned the Governor to commute Morva's sentence from death to life in prison without the possibility of parole and to start treating him with antipsychotic drugs.

On June 27, 2017, the National Alliance on Mental Illness (NAMI) wrote a letter to Governor McAuliffe asking him to stop the execution of a clearly mentally ill man. NAMI highlighted the fact that Morva had been diagnosed with a long-standing mental illness that was initially misdiagnosed and that the jury did not hear that Morva's delusions led to his crimes.

On June 28, 2017, Linda A. Klein, the president of the American Bar Association (ABA), wrote to Governor McAuliffe to express concern over the scheduled execution of Morva. She asked the Governor to fully review evidence of Morva's delusions at the time he committed the crimes until the present.

On June 29, 2017, advocacy groups presented petition signatures of over 31,000 persons to Governor McAuliffe's office, urging him to grant clemency to Morva. The signatures were collected by the ACLU, Amnesty International, NAMI, Mental Health America in Virginia, the Virginia Council of Churches, and Virginians for Alternatives to the Death Penalty. Bill Farrar with the ACLU of Virginia expressed that "severe mental illness should not be a death sentence."

On July 3, 2017, Virginia delegate Mark Levine wrote that the execution of Morva would be a grave injustice. Levine noted that during the sentencing hearing, the jury was reportedly not informed of Morva's mental state or that he had delusions. Levine stressed that the jury had a right to know the full truth when deciding to give the death penalty. Delegate Levine, along with 27 other Democratic Virginia lawmakers, asked Governor McAuliffe to grant clemency for Morva. State lawmakers, who included 17 delegates: Del. Charniele Herring, Del. Jennifer Boysko, Del. Patrick A. Hope, Del. Sam Rasoul, Del. Marcus B. Simon, and Del. Eileen Filler-Corn, Del. Lamont Bagby, Del. Rob Bell, Del. Jeff Bourne, Del. Paul Krizek, Del. Joseph C. Lindsey, Del. Kenneth R. Plum, Del. Mark D. Sickles, Del. Marcus Simon, Del. Rip Sullivan, Del. Jeion Ward, and Del. Vivian E. Watts; five (5) senators: Sen. Adam Ebbin, Sen. Barbara Favola, Sen. Lionell Spruill, Sr., Sen. Mamie E. Locke and Sen. Scott Surovell, Minority Whip Alfonso Lopez, and House Democratic leader David Toscano, all joined this call for clemency. Members of Congress also voiced their support for clemency, including three Democratic United States House Representatives: Bobby Scott, Gerald "Gerry" Connolly, and Don Beyer.

Representatives from both Hungary, which had granted William Morva citizenship and the European Union met with and sent letters urging Governor McAuliffe to stop the execution of Morva. On July 5, 2017, two rights experts from the United Nations urged McAuliffe to halt the execution of a man with a psychosocial disability.

The same day, Rachel Sutphin, the daughter of Deputy Sheriff Eric Sutphin, one of the two men slain by William Morva, also expressed her support for his clemency petition. She asked McAuliffe to spare his life.

== Mental illness ==
Morva's mental decline initially was attributed to schizotypal personality disorder; he was diagnosed with the disorder following his arrest. As a result of this diagnosis, the jurors who sentenced him to death were told that he merely had odd beliefs and attitudes.

A fuller evaluation conducted later during his appeal determined that the diagnosis of schizotypal personality disorder was incorrect and that Morva had delusional disorder, which left him unable to tell reality from delusion.

Morva's case raises ethical questions about executing those with serious mental illnesses.

The ethical questions surrounding the execution of mentally ill persons is not a new issue in Virginia. In the past, governors have halted executions for mental health concerns. In 2008, Governor Tim Kaine commuted Percy Levar Walton's death sentence amid concerns about his competency. A decade earlier, Governor Jim Gilmore spared the life of Calvin Eugene Swann, who had schizophrenia.

== Related incident ==
Morva's brother, Michael Morva, was charged with conspiring to help his brother escape. The alleged conspiracy occurred in January 2006, when both brothers were in jail on charges related to the attempted robbery. Michael denied any connection with Morva's escape in August 2006 from police custody but was convicted on August 3, 2010, and sentenced to three years in prison.

At Michael Morva's sentencing in 2010, jurors asked the judge to recommend he receive mental health treatment. Both Morva brothers were diagnosed with delusional disorder, which has a genetic component. Michael Morva received treatment for his mental illness in prison and was released on May 27, 2016, after serving his sentence.

== See also ==
- Capital punishment in Virginia
- List of most recent executions by jurisdiction
- List of people executed in Virginia
- List of people executed in the United States in 2017
- List of United States Supreme Court cases involving mental health
- List of white defendants executed for killing a black victim
- Mentally ill people in United States jails and prisons
- Race and capital punishment in the United States

== Notes ==
Executions carried out in Virginia
Preceded by Ricky Javon Gray January 18, 2017	William Charles Morva; July 6, 2017	Succeeded by none
Executions carried out in the United States
Preceded by Robert Bryant Melson – Alabama June 8, 2017	William Charles Morva – Virginia; July 6, 2017	Succeeded by Ronald Ray Phillips – Ohio July 26, 2017
White defendants executed for killing a black victim in the United States
Preceded by Christopher Chubasco Wilkins – Texas January 11, 2017	William Charles Morva – Virginia; July 6, 2017	Succeeded by Mark James Asay – Florida August 24, 2017
