= Percy Levar Walton =

American convicted murderer (born 1978)

- Born: October 18, 1978 (age 47); Danville, Virginia
- Convictions: 3x aggravated murder
- Penalty: Originally sentenced to death; on June 9, 2008, commuted to life in prison without the possibility of parole

Details
- Victims: 3
- Date: November 1996

Percy Levar Walton (born October 18, 1978) is an American convicted murderer who was convicted and sentenced to death in 1997 for the November 1996 murders of Elizabeth and Jessee Kendrick, aged 81 and 80, and Archie Moore, aged 33, in Danville, Virginia.

He was scheduled to be executed on June 8, 2006, but the governor of Virginia, Tim Kaine, stayed the execution one hour before it was due to take place and ordered a mental examination of the convict to determine if he is fit for execution or not. It was reported that Walton has an IQ of just 66, albeit other reports state that a test conducted before his 18th birthday put his IQ at 90.

Governor Kaine stated that it would be immoral to either execute or pardon Walton without further investigations, and ordered that the court would evaluate the results of the examinations and, if applicable, set a new execution date on December 9, 2006. Kaine's decision sparked criticism from his political opponents, who during his 2005 election campaign claimed that he was soft on crime and no longer willing to make use of the death penalty.

The State of Virginia set an execution date of June 10, 2008; however on June 9, 2008, Governor Tim Kaine commuted his sentence to life in prison without parole, stating "one cannot reasonably conclude that Walton is fully aware of the punishment he is about to suffer and why he is to suffer it."

Walton was subsequently moved to the Marion Treatment Center, a Virginia Department of Corrections facility specially equipped to help mentally ill inmates. "Percy Walton is extremely mentally ill and profoundly impaired, and so obviously I think the governor acted appropriately and compassionately in granting our clemency request," attorney Jennifer Givens said.

As of 2025, Percy Levar Walton is currently housed at the Greensville Correctional Center.
