= Greensville Correctional Center =

State prison in Greensville County, Virginia

Coordinates: 36.7988°N 77.4864°W

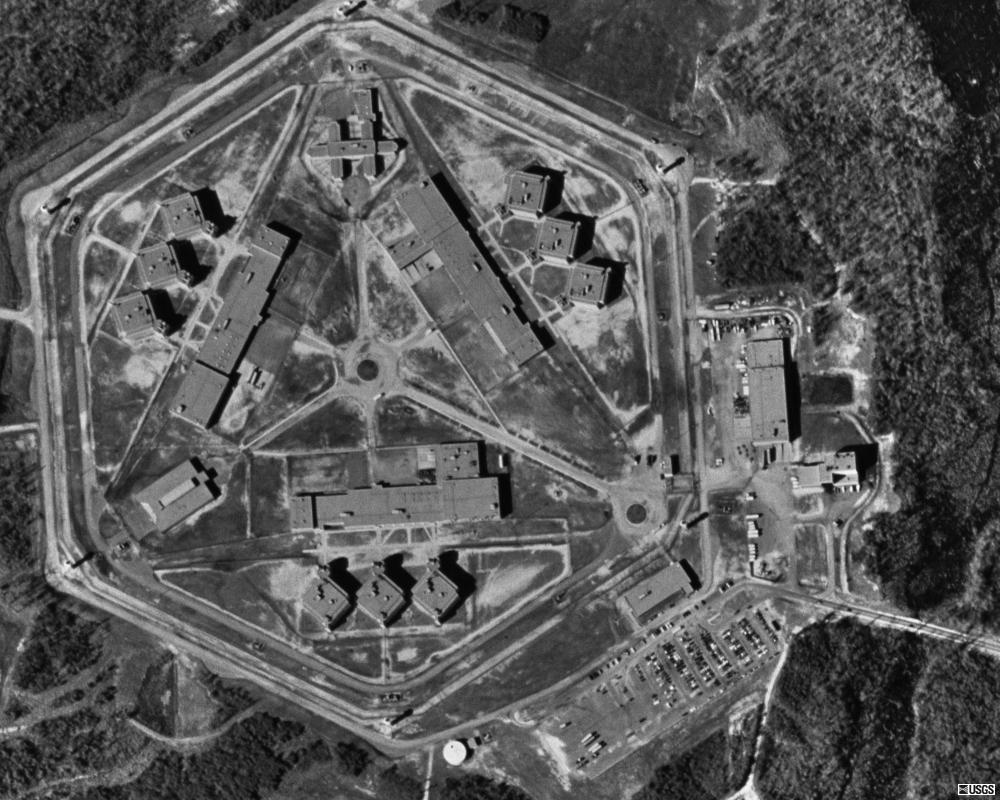
- 1994 aerial photo of the prison
- Interactive map of Greensville Correctional Center
- Location: 901 Corrections Way Jarratt, Virginia 23870-9614
- Status: Operational
- Security class: Level 3 (correctional center); Level 1 (work center)
- Population: 2,424 (August 2023)
- Opened: September 1990
- Managed by: Virginia Department of Corrections
- Warden: Clint Davis

Greensville Correctional Center is a prison facility located in unincorporated Greensville County, Virginia, near Jarratt. The prison, on a 1,105-acre (447 ha) plot of land, is operated by the Virginia Department of Corrections. Greensville housed the execution chamber that was used to carry out capital punishment by the Commonwealth of Virginia until the death penalty in Virginia was abolished in 2021.

== History ==
Opened in September 1990 in a ceremony presided over by Governor of Virginia L. Douglas Wilder, the $106 million facility was built to provide initial relief to the then overcrowded Virginia correctional system. The facility opening allowed for the subsequent closure of the Virginia State Penitentiary in downtown Richmond. The execution chamber moved from the former state penitentiary to Greensville in 1991.

Initially, the center was classified as a maximum security facility. However, with the subsequent opening of other facilities intended for the most hardened violent criminals, the security classification at Greensville has been lowered to medium security. The facility consists of 4 pod-style buildings (three have a capacity for 516 inmates each; the fourth can handle 192 higher-risk inmates) arranged in a hexagon in a 125-acre (0.51 km^{2}) campus-like setting. The tract of land upon which the Correctional Center is constructed measures 1,105 acres (4.47 km^{2}). It is located 1 mile (1.6 km) from Interstate 95. The primary contractor for the project was Morrison-Knudsen. There is a double perimeter fence topped with razor wire as well as six 52-foot (16 m) high guard towers to bolster perimeter security.

In July 1995, a minimum-security work camp for low-risk inmates was opened adjacent to the main complex. Together, the two facilities have a capacity of 3,007 inmates.

The facility contains a dedicated health care unit and mental health center which serves inmates in the eastern region of the Virginia corrections system. It was also home to the state death chamber, which was completed in April 1991; before Virginia abolished the death penalty in 2021, there were 111 executions by electrocution or lethal injection that have taken place in the L Building, located at the rear of the facility.

== Notable executions at Greensville Correctional Center ==
- Albert Jay Clozza – raped and murdered 13-year old Patricia Bolton; executed on July 24, 1991, the first person executed at Greensville Correctional Center.
- Roger Keith Coleman – convicted murderer of Wanda Faye McCoy and cause célèbre; executed on May 20, 1992. DNA evidence later confirmed his guilt.
- Syvasky Lafayette Poyner – spree killer; executed on March 18, 1993.
- Timothy Wilson Spencer – serial killer known as the Southside Strangler; executed on April 27, 1994.
- Dawud Majid Mu'Min – raped, robbed, and murdered Gladys Nopwasky while in a prison work crew; executed on November 13, 1997.
- Angel Francisco Breard – raped and murdered Ruth Dickie; executed on April 14, 1998, despite international pressure since Breard was a Paraguayan national.
- Dennis Wayne Eaton – convicted of murdering a state trooper and three other people in 1989; executed on June 18, 1998, by lethal injection.
- Tommy David Strickler– convicted of the 1990 murder of Leann Whitlock and executed on July 21, 1999.
- Michael David Clagett – convicted of the 1994 Virginia bar murders and executed on July 6, 2000.
- Mir Aimal Kansi – perpetrator of the 1993 CIA headquarters shootings; executed on November 14, 2002.
- Earl Conrad Bramblett – mass murderer; executed on April 9, 2003.
- Brandon Wayne Hedrick - convicted of the abduction, rape, and murder of Lisa Yvonne Crider, executed on July 20, 2006.
- John Allen Muhammad – serial killer and spree killer known as the Beltway Sniper for the Beltway Sniper Attacks; executed on November 10, 2009.
- Paul Warner Powell – raped and murdered Stacie Reed; executed on March 18, 2010.
- Teresa Wilson Bean Lewis – convicted of murder of husband and stepson; executed on September 23, 2010, the only woman executed by Virginia via lethal injection.
- Robert Charles Gleason Jr. – serial killer executed on January 16, 2013, the last person executed by Virginia via electric chair.
- Alfredo Rolando Prieto – serial killer; executed on October 1, 2015.
- Ricky Javon Gray – convicted of 2006 Richmond spree murders; executed on January 18, 2017.
- William Charles Morva – spree killer; executed on July 6, 2017, the last person executed by Virginia.

== Non-Death Row ==
- Ronald Rodan - Charged and found guilty for the disappearance and murder of Bethany Decker.
- Percy Walton - convicted of the murder of three strangers in Danville, Virginia.
- Jim Williams - YouTuber known as "Jay Williams Let's Live Life" served a majority of a 10 year sentence for Robbery and Malicious Wounding.

== See also ==
- Capital punishment in Virginia
- List of Virginia state prisons
