= Murder in Virginia law =

Murder in Virginia law constitutes the intentional killing, under circumstances defined by law, of people within or under the jurisdiction of the U.S. state of Virginia.

The United States Centers for Disease Control and Prevention reported that in the year 2020, the state had a murder rate slightly below the median for the entire country.

== Felony murder rule ==
In the state of Virginia, the common law felony murder rule is codified at Code of Virginia §§ 18.2-32, 18.2-33. This rule provides that anyone who kills another human being during the perpetration or attempted perpetration of arson, rape, forcible sodomy, inanimate or animate object sexual penetration, robbery, burglary or abduction is guilty of first degree murder.

== Penalties ==
Offense	Mandatory sentencing
Involuntary manslaughter	Up to 10 years in prison
Voluntary manslaughter	Up to 10 years in prison
Second-degree murder	5 to 40 years in prison
Felony murder	5 to 40 years in prison
First-degree murder	Minimum of 20 years and maximum of life in prison (prisoners are eligible for geriatric parole when they turn 60; eligible for parole after 20 years if the defendant was a juvenile)
Aggravated murder	Life without parole (ineligible for geriatric parole; eligible for parole after 20 years if the defendant was a juvenile) (Judge can use discretion to suspend portion of life sentence unless the victim was a police officer)

== See also ==
- Law of Virginia
