= Capital punishment in Virginia =

Capital punishment was abolished in Virginia on March 24, 2021, when Governor Ralph Northam signed a bill into law. The law took effect on July 1, 2021. Virginia is the 23rd state to abolish the death penalty, and the first southern state in the United States to do so.

The first execution in what would become the United States was carried out in Jamestown, Virginia, in 1608, when Captain George Kendall was executed in Jamestown for spying. Death penalty researcher Daniel Hearn has placed the number of executions in the state as over 2,000. In the modern, post-Gregg era, Virginia conducted 113 executions, the fourth most in the country, behind only Texas, Oklahoma and Florida. The last execution in the state was on July 6, 2017, when William Morva was executed via lethal injection for murder.

== Early history ==
The first recorded execution in the United States took place in 1608 at the Jamestown Colony in Virginia. Captain George Kendall was executed for treason. Hanging was the predominant method for executions before 1909. Other methods had been used during this time — three people convicted of piracy in 1700 were gibbeted, four pirates were hanged in chains in 1720, and a female slave was burned in 1737. Virginia was the first southern state to adopt electrocution, doing so in 1908; from 1910 until 1994, the electric chair was used for all executions.

On February 2, 1951, four African Americans (of the Martinsville Seven) were executed for rape in one case and another was executed for murder in an unrelated case—the most executions held on a single day in Virginia. On February 5, 1951, the remaining three defendants in the rape case were executed. The case of the Martinsville Seven led to scrutiny of racial bias in death penalties for rape in Virginia. With the exception of John Perkins in 1868, only Black men were executed for rape in Virginia after the American Civil War. The last execution for rape was that of serial rapist Linwood Bunch on February 17, 1961.

The youngest person to have been executed in Virginia was Clem, a 12-year-old slave who was owned by Hartwell Seat. Clem was hanged in 1787 for the murders of Henry Seat and Miles Seat. After the 19th century, only two women, Virginia Christian in 1912 and Teresa Lewis in 2010, were put to death by the state, when it took over executions from the counties.

Virginia has carried out one confirmed wrongful execution. In 1736, Andrew, a slave belonging to Richard Bradford, and a married white indentured servant named Elizabeth Williams were convicted of adultery for having consensual sex in Caroline County. Unsatisfied with the verdict, some successfully lobbied for Andrew to be prosecuted for rape. Andrew was convicted of rape, sentenced to death, and executed on June 4, 1736. The incident was later seen as a miscarriage of justice since it was undisputed that the two had engaged in consensual sex. Going forward, the county stopped punishing black men when white women gave birth to mixed race children. However, four white women would be flogged in such cases.

== Modern era post-Gregg ==
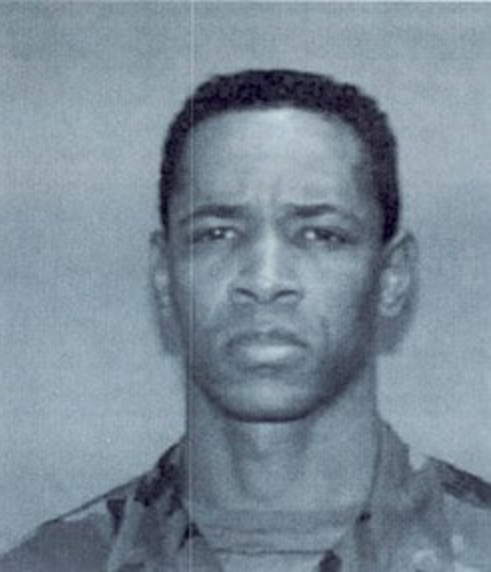
John Allen Muhammad during his time in the military

After the Supreme Court of the United States upheld Georgia's "guided discretion" laws in Gregg v. Georgia, Virginia's laws were modified along the same lines. The first person executed after being sentenced to death under these laws was Frank J. Coppola on August 10, 1982. He was the first person executed by the state in the modern era.

The electric chair continued to be solely used until 1994, when legislation was enacted giving inmates the choice of lethal injection or the electric chair, with lethal injection the default method if no decision was made. Seven inmates opted for the Virginia electric chair; the last to do so was Robert Gleason on January 16, 2013. Former Governor Tim Kaine has also stated that he opposes the option of the electric chair, but did not move to drop it as an option while in office.

Executions were carried out at Greensville Correctional Center near Jarratt, Virginia; the men's death row was located at the Sussex I State Prison near Waverly, Virginia and the women's death row was at the Fluvanna Correctional Center for Women. The execution chamber moved from the former Virginia State Penitentiary to Greensville in 1991. On August 3, 1998, the male death row moved from Mecklenburg Correctional Center to Sussex I.

In 1992, Roger Keith Coleman was executed by the state for the 1981 rape and murder of his sister-in-law Wanda McCoy. Coleman's case drew national and worldwide attention before and after his execution because of his repeated claims of innocence: Time magazine featured Coleman on its May 18, 1992, cover. After his death, his was the second case nationally in which DNA evidence was analyzed of an executed man. In January 2006, Virginia Governor Mark Warner announced that testing of DNA evidence had conclusively proven that Coleman was guilty of the crime. On November 10, 2009, Virginia executed spree killer John Allen Muhammad for the 2002 D.C. sniper attacks during which he killed 10 people. He was tried in Virginia rather than the District of Columbia in order to establish an impartial jury pool, and his death sentence was carried out in only six years.

The last person to be sentenced to death in Virginia was Mark E. Lawlor on June 23, 2011. In 2020, Lawlor won a federal appeal which required a new sentencing phase, and the new commonwealth attorney chose to reduce the sentence to life in prison without parole citing their personal beliefs regarding capital punishment.

== Abolition ==
In February 2021, the Virginia General Assembly voted to abolish the death penalty, and Governor Ralph Northam signed the bill into law on March 24, 2021. The bill took effect on July 1, 2021. Only two people were on death row in Virginia at the time of the abolition: Anthony Juniper and Thomas A. Porter. Their sentences were commuted to life without parole. The last execution in Virginia occurred in July 2017, when William Morva was executed for two murders he committed in 2006. The daughter of one of his victims supported the bill to end capital punishment, calling the practice outdated, ineffective, and failing to provide her any closure.

== Legal process ==
Before abolition, when the prosecution intended to seek the death penalty, the sentence was decided by the jury and had to be unanimous. In case of a hung jury during the penalty phase of the trial, a life sentence was issued, even if a single juror opposed death (there was no retrial). The governor held the power of clemency with respect to death sentences. The method of execution up until abolition was lethal injection, unless the condemned requested electrocution instead.

State law specified that at least six citizens who are not employees of the Department of Corrections were required to serve as witnesses to the execution. Since Governor George Allen signed an executive order on the matter in 1994, relatives of the victim(s) in the case had the right to witness the execution. Relatives of the condemned inmate were barred from being present. Virginia was the state with the shortest time on average between death sentence and execution (less than 8 years).

== Capital crimes ==
Before abolition in 2021, capital murder was the only crime for which the death penalty was applicable in Virginia. Under Virginia Criminal Code, capital murder was defined as "willful, deliberate, and premeditated" killing involving at least one of the following aggravating factors:

1. Be committed in the commission of abduction, when such abduction was committed with the intent to extort money or a pecuniary benefit or with the intent to defile the victim of such abduction;
2. Be committed for hire;
3. Be committed by a prisoner confined in a state or local correctional facility, or while in the custody of an employee thereof;
4. Be committed in the commission of robbery or attempted robbery;
5. Be committed in the commission of, or subsequent to, rape or attempted rape, forcible sodomy or attempted forcible sodomy or object sexual penetration;
6. Be committed against a law-enforcement officer, even of another state or of the federal government, when such killing is for the purpose of interfering with the performance of his official duties;
7. Be committed against more than one person as a part of the same act or transaction;
8. Be committed against more than one person within a three-year period;
9. Be committed in the commission of or attempted commission of drug trafficking;
10. Be committed pursuant to the direction or order of one who is engaged in a continuing criminal enterprise;
11. Be committed against a pregnant woman by one who knows that the woman is pregnant and has the intent to cause the involuntary termination of the woman's pregnancy without a live birth;
12. Be committed against a person under the age of 14 by a person age 21 or older;
13. Be committed in the commission of or attempted commission of an act of terrorism;
14. Be committed against a justice or judge when the killing is for the purpose of interfering with his official duties;
15. Be committed against a witness in a criminal case for the purpose of interfering with the person's duties in such case.

== See also ==
- Capital punishment in the United States
- Crime in Virginia
- Law of Virginia
- List of people executed in Virginia (pre-1972)
