= List of Virginia state prisons =

This is a list of state prisons in Virginia. It does not include federal prisons or county jails located in the Commonwealth of Virginia.

Facility	Location	Capacity	Notes
Augusta Correctional Center	Craigsville		Closed on July 1, 2024
Appalachian Detention Center	Honaker	1066	
Baskerville Correctional Center	Baskerville	488	
Bland Correctional Center	Bland	621	
Brunswick Work Center	Lawrenceville	708	
Buckingham Correctional Center	Dillwyn	1,100	
Caroline Correctional Unit	Hanover	137	
Central Virginia Correctional Unit #13	Chesterfield	250	
Coffeewood Correctional Center	Mitchells	1,193	
Cold Springs Correctional Unit #10	Greenville	150	
Culpeper Correctional Facility for Women	Culpeper		Closed as of 2014
Deep Meadow Correctional Center	Powhatan County	840	
Deerfield Correctional Center	Capron	1,069	
Dillwyn Correctional Center	Dillwyn	1,106	
Fluvanna Correctional Center for Women	Troy	1,200	
Green Rock Correctional Center	Chatham	987	
Greensville Correctional Center	Jarratt	3,055	
Halifax Correctional Unit	South Boston	248	
Haynesville Correctional Center	Haynesville	1,141	
Haynesville Correctional Unit #17	Haynesville		Closed on July 1, 2024
Indian Creek Correctional Center	Chesapeake	1,002	
James River Correctional Center	Goochland County		Closed April 1, 2011
Keen Mountain Correctional Center	Oakwood	879	
Lawrenceville Correctional Center	Lawrenceville	1,555	Operated by GEO Group as Virginia's only private state prison, until Aug. 1, 2024, when the State took it over.
Lunenburg Correctional Center	Victoria	1,200	
Marion Correctional Treatment Center	Marion	375	Mental health hospital
Mecklenburg Correctional Center	Boydton		Closed 2012
Nottoway Correctional Center	Burkeville	1,112	
Patrick Henry Correctional Unit	Ridgeway	136	
Pocahontas State Correctional Center	Pocahontas	1,034	
Powhatan Correctional Center			Closed 2015
Red Onion State Prison	Pound	848	
River North Correctional Center	Independence	1,024	
Rustburg Correctional Unit	Rustburg	152	
St. Brides Correctional Center	Chesapeake	1,192	
Sussex I State Prison	Waverly	1,139	
Sussex II State Prison	Waverly		Closed on July 1, 2024
Virginia Correctional Center for Women	Goochland	572	
Wallens Ridge State Prison	Big Stone Gap	1,200	
Wise Correctional Unit	Coeburn	108	
