= Morris Mason =

American murderer (1954–1985)

- Born: March 28, 1954; Philadelphia, Pennsylvania, U.S.
- Died: June 25, 1985 (aged 31); Virginia State Penitentiary, Virginia, U.S.
- Other name: The Killer for the Eastern Shore
- Status: Executed by electrocution
- Convictions: Capital murder First degree murder Attempted murder Abduction; Rape (2 counts); Sodomy; Malicious wounding Arson (4 counts); Burglary; Breaking and entering (3 counts); Grand larceny
- Penalty: Death

Details
- Victims: Ursula Stevenson, 86; Margaret Keen Hand, 71
- Span of crimes: May 2 – 14, 1978
- Country: United States
- State: Virginia
- Date apprehended: May 15, 1978

Morris Odell Mason (March 28, 1954 – June 25, 1985) was an American convicted rapist and murderer who called himself "the killer for the Eastern Shore". He was executed for the murder of Margaret K. Hand, although he was responsible for at least one other murder committed during a killing spree days prior that involved multiple burglaries and sexual assaults. His execution was controversial due to his diagnosis of schizophrenia and developmental disabilities, the latter of which caused activists and even Mason's executioner to worry that Mason was not mentally sound enough to be aware of his impending execution.

Governor Chuck Robb refused to grant clemency to Mason, citing internal memos stating that several psychiatric analyses of Mason indicated that he understood his actions. The memos also showed that Mason had retrieved incriminating evidence from Hand's burning house to avoid implicating himself. Furthermore, in two interviews prior to his execution, Mason exhibited full awareness of both his upcoming execution and why it was happening. In both interviews, he expressed remorse for his actions.

== Background ==
=== Early life ===
Mason was born in Philadelphia and was raised by his mother in Northampton County, Virginia. When he was a child, he complained that he could hear voices that ordered him to "destroy things." His neighbors reported that he was interested in firestarting as a child. He struggled in academics and never completed high school. Mason also joined the U.S. Army during the Vietnam War.

Years prior to the crimes that landed Mason on death row, Mason was diagnosed with intellectual disability, having been tested as having an IQ of 66, with another test showing that he had an IQ of 62. On three separate occasions, Mason was also diagnosed with paranoid schizophrenia. He was first placed under involuntary psychiatric commitment when he was 17 years old.

=== Early crimes ===
In 1975, Mason burglarized and set fire to a house in Virginia's Eastern Shore region. Shortly before Mason's conviction for those crimes, Dr. Richard Williams, a Chesapeake-based psychiatrist, examined Mason and found him to be mentally ill and unstable. A second psychiatric examination at Central State Hospital recommended that Mason be given psychiatric care while in prison serving his sentence for the grand larceny and arson. After the crime spree that landed him on death row, however, authorities refused to confirm whether Mason had been given psychiatric care during his first incarceration. For the grand larceny and arson, Mason was sentenced to 20 years in prison with 10 years suspended. It was Mason's first time in prison, but authorities suspected that he may have been responsible for other house fires and burglaries in his teens.

Prior to his parole in 1978, the Virginia Parole Board requested another evaluation of Mason, this time by an Eastern Shore parole officer. The parole board ultimately permitted Mason's release, and on April 12, 1978, just under a month before his crime spree, Mason was paroled. He got a job at a chicken planting house and lived with his mother, stepfather, and three stepsisters.

On May 1, 1978, the day before Ursula Stevenson's murder, Mason defrauded an innkeeper. On May 8, 1978, he was found guilty and received a 30-day suspended sentence. His parole officers were aware of his new conviction, but allowed Mason to remain on parole. A few days before the murder spree began, Mason asked his parole officer to help him be placed in psychiatric custody or a halfway house because "he was sure something terrible would happen" and cited difficulties with his alcoholic drinking habits. There were no halfway houses available in Virginia to take him in, so Mason was not placed into custody at the time.

== Crime spree ==
On May 2, 1978, Mason burglarized the home of 86-year-old Ursula Stevenson in Birdsnest, Virginia. He raped and murdered her, and then he set her house on fire. Mason's parole officers were informed that he was a suspect, but allowed him to remain on parole.

On May 13, 1978, Mason burglarized the home of 71-year-old Margaret Keen Hand. After forcing her to close her drapes and take off her clothes, he raped and sodomized her, beat her with an axe as she pleaded for her life, forced her to sit in a chair, nailed her wrist to the chair's armrest, tied her up, and set the room on fire. He left, but he returned to the house to retrieve a bag with his identity papers in it. Mason attributed this murder to an "alcoholic rampage."

On May 14, 1978, Mason burglarized a house where two sisters, aged 12 and 13, were home alone. The 13-year-old retrieved her father's pistol and attempted to shoot Mason, but he wrested the pistol from her and shot her in the abdomen, leaving her a paraplegic. Mason then kidnapped the 12-year-old and took her to a forest, where he raped and sodomized her, covered her with leaves, and set the leaves on fire. The leaves burned the girl's shirt and hair. Both girls survived the attacks. Later the same day, he burned down an unoccupied house owned by a woman. He was arrested on May 15, the next day. The homeowner of the burned house and the 12 and 13-year-old sisters later sued Mason's parole officers for negligence for not revoking his parole. However, their lawsuit was dismissed.

Against the advice of his attorneys, who urged him to use an insanity defense, Mason pleaded guilty to rape, arson, and capital murder. In court, after issuing his guilty plea, Mason boasted, "I am the killer for the Eastern Shore. I'm the only killer they ever had around here. I made the Eastern Shore popular." A judge sentenced him to death. Mason received seven life sentences plus 100 years for his other crimes. Shortly after his conviction and death sentence, Mason gave an interview in which he stated that his situation did not "worry" him and rhetorically asked, "Why should it worry me? I did wrong, right? So I get electrocuted."

== Death row, appeals, and execution ==
=== Death row ===
Mason's execution was controversial due to his mental disabilities. Other Virginia death row inmates, including Dennis Stockton and Joseph Giarratano, talked in diary entries and retrospective interviews about the fact that Mason was "crazy" and that "something wasn't right" with him. In a letter to anti-death penalty activist Reverend Joe Ingle, Giarratano said living with Mason on death row was like "living with a hyperactive eight-year-old. He could never sit still, and would never stop talking." Another unnamed inmate stated that inmates in the Virginia State Penitentiary felt "rare sympathy" for Mason because, despite the severity of his crimes, "it's evident the man ain't responsible" [sic]. Another inmate said, "He acts just like a big baby. . . . He couldn't stand to be by hisself [sic]. He would pay dudes with his VA money just to keep him company, write letters for him and stuff."

=== Appeals for clemency ===
Before Mason's execution, eight clergymen from Richmond, Virginia, met with Governor Chuck Robb in a bid to convince Robb to spare Mason's life on the basis of his mental disabilities. Robb ultimately refused to interfere in Mason's electrocution, allowing it to move forward. In justifying his decision, Robb cited internal memos stating that several psychiatric analyses of Mason completed by psychiatrists hired by the state of Virginia demonstrated that despite Mason's low IQ, schizophrenia, and intellectual disabilities, he understood his actions. The memos also cited Mason's retrieval of identifying information from Hand's burning house showing that he took steps to avoid implicating himself.

Mason's attorneys also petitioned the U.S. Supreme Court, given that a recent ruling would have permitted them to grant Mason a stay of execution based on his psychological disorders so that he could undergo examination by an independent psychiatrist. However, because Mason pleaded guilty to his charges, he was not eligible for a stay of execution under the ruling.

=== Execution ===
Mason's last meal consisted of four Big Macs, two large orders of French fries, two ice cream sundaes, two apple pies, and two large grape sodas, which he shared with two guards. He spent some of his final hours with Jerry Givens, Virginia's executioner who would ultimately carry out Mason's electrocution. Givens stated afterwards that Mason did not eat all of his sundaes and, instead, told Givens, "I can't eat all this; put it in the freezer for tomorrow." Givens said this made him realize Mason "had no idea" what was happening to him or that he was going to be executed: "He was not kidding or being sarcastic; I knew that he wasn't ready." Marie Deans, a death penalty abolitionist who was also with Mason during his final hours, stated that he was childlike and that his execution would be "just like killing an 8-year-old." Deans also said that shortly before he was led to the electric chair, Mason asked her what he should wear to his own funeral.

Mason also gave at least two interviews in the months leading up to his execution. The first interview was with the Richmond News Leader on January 31, 1985. During the interview, Mason said he could not remember much of Hand's murder beyond breaking into her house, as he had been on drugs and had blacked out; he then apologized for his actions, stating, "I'm totally sorry for doing it, that I broke into [Hand's] house, and, if I hurt her, I'm sorry". He said he recalled hearing voices on the night of the murder instructing him "to destroy something, tear up something," that he "just went on a rampage and tore up something", and that he had first complained of hearing voices in 1974. In a second interview with the Richmond News Leader just hours before his execution, Mason said he was not afraid to die, telling the reporter, "I ain't scared. I ain't worried one bit, because I got the Lord with me." Mason once more expressed remorse for the crime that sent him to death row and asked his victims for forgiveness, stating, "If I hadn't been on drugs, it wouldn't have happened".

Mason was executed on June 25, 1985. He asked Deans to escort him to the death chamber. He had no formal last words, although he briefly spoke to Tony Bair to say he would "go out strong just like I promised you." Bair was the warden of the Mecklenburg Correctional Center, where Virginia's death row inmates were held before their transfers to the Virginia State Penitentiary where the execution chamber and electric chair were held.

== See also ==
- Capital punishment in Virginia
- List of people executed in Virginia
- List of people executed in the United States in 1985
- Ricky Ray Rector
- Atkins v. Virginia

== General references ==
- Associated Press (June 26, 1985). "Two Men Convicted Of Murder Are Executed In Virginia And Texas". The New York Times.
- Helen Redmond. Executions Banned For Mentally Retarded. The New Abolitionist (August 2002, Issue 25). Retrieved on 2007-08-13.
- US Executions since 1976. Clark County Prosecutor. Retrieved on 2007-08-13.
- Human Rights Watch. "Beyond Reason: Defendants with Mental Retardation: Their Stories". Human Rights Watch.
