= Wilbert Lee Evans =

Executed American inmate from Virginia (1946–1990)

- Born: January 20, 1946; Raleigh, North Carolina, U.S.
- Died: October 17, 1990 (aged 44); Virginia State Penitentiary, Richmond, Virginia, U.S.
- Cause of death: Execution by electrocution
- Other name: Willie Evans
- Status: Executed
- Motive: To avoid arrest
- Convictions: North Carolina; Larceny and receiving Simple assault Attempted escape Assault (Note: The assault conviction was a felony; all the other crimes were misdemeanors.); Virginia; Capital murder
- Penalty: North Carolina; 4 to 5 years (Assault); Virginia; Death

Details
- Victims: William G. Truesdale, 47
- Date: January 27, 1981
- States: North Carolina and Virginia

Wilbert Lee Evans (January 20, 1946 – October 17, 1990) was an American convict who was executed in Virginia's electric chair for the murder of 47-year-old Deputy Sheriff William Gene Truesdale in Alexandria, Virginia. Truesdale's murder occurred in 1981 during Evans's attempted escape from custody, as Evans was accused of other crimes in North Carolina, including a previous murder, and had been temporarily transported to Virginia to testify in another man's extradition hearing there.

Evans's execution was controversial due to several factors, including his documented good behavior and rehabilitation behind bars; trial errors and prosecutorial misconduct that human rights organizations, death penalty abolitionists, and Evans's attorneys argued should have resulted in a retrial or a reduced sentence; and the gruesome nature of Evans's death, as reporters who witnessed his execution in Virginia's electric chair described it as botched, and The Virginian-Pilot called Evans's execution "one of Virginia's worst." In 2023, NPR obtained and released documents and tape recordings of several executions in Virginia's electric chair, one of which was that of Evans; the tape recording of Evans's execution did not include mention of it being botched, although contemporaneous press reports and witness accounts did.

== Early life ==
Evans was born to a father who was a funeral home director and a mother who was a housekeeper. He had five brothers and sisters. He grew up in Raleigh, North Carolina. When Evans was six years old, his mother died. His father died of a heart attack in March 1990, months before Evans's execution. Evans had only an elementary school education, although he gained literacy skills by reading court opinions and educating himself in law while on death row.

At the age of 18, Evans burglarized a gas station, seriously injuring one person. At another point in his youth, he took three members of a prison disciplinary committee as hostages and held them at knifepoint.

At the time of Truesdale's murder, Evans was charged with crimes in North Carolina. Several newspapers in 1981 described the charges as being for capital murder and robbery, while The Washington Post described the charges in 1990 as being for assault; the Richmond Times-Dispatch further stated that Evans had entered a North Carolina credit union, taken an employee to a backroom, threatened to kill her while holding her at gunpoint, and beaten her. While in custody in North Carolina awaiting trial on those charges, he was sent to Alexandria, Virginia, to testify at an extradition hearing for Clifton Taylor, alias Rufus Blood Taylor, a man charged with capital murder in the death of Bishop Mae Lawson.

On August 31, 1978, Evans was accused of shooting and killing 37-year-old Alton J. Collins during an argument over $20 in a card game in Raleigh. Evans was charged with Collins' murder, but the case never went to trial.

== Murder of William Truesdale ==
At approximately 3:30 pm on January 27, 1981, 47-year-old Deputy Sheriff William Truesdale, a native of Landover, Maryland, was in the process of transferring Evans and two additional prisoners in a van from the Alexandria Courthouse to the Alexandria City Jail following the extradition hearing at which Evans had testified. While the three prisoners left the van, Evans overpowered Truesdale and grabbed Truesdale's .38-caliber revolver. Evans then fired the gun, striking Truesdale at least once in the chest and causing Truesdale to fall down the stairs leading outside the jail. Evans then used the same revolver to shoot at the handcuffs keeping him tethered to the other two prisoners and fled the scene. Evans was a fugitive for fewer than 30 minutes. During this time, as Evans evaded other officers who responded to Truesdale's shooting, he attempted to shoot at two additional police officers, but the gun misfired. Police cornered him in a parking lot eight blocks away, at which point Evans shot himself in the stomach. Evans's self-inflicted gunshot wound proved to be nonfatal; Evans was sent to a hospital, where, the day after the shooting, he was reported to be in stable condition.

Truesdale died during surgery at Alexandria Hospital the day after the shooting.

== Trial, death row, and appeals ==
=== Trial ===
At trial, Evans apologized for the murder of Truesdale, testifying on the stand, "I didn't have no [sic] intention to shoot anyone. I'm sorry." During his trial and on death row, Evans insisted that Truesdale's shooting was an accident and that he unintentionally shot Truesdale while trying to shoot his handcuffs. Other officers who pursued Evans after Truesdale's shooting disputed Evans's contention that the shooting was an accident. One testified to Evans pointing Truesdale's gun at them and attempting to shoot at him and his partner when they caught up to Evans. Evans also claimed that his desire to run was impulsive, testifying during the trial that "[he] ended up with a hold of the gun and [he and Truesdale] were tussling. [Evans] was trying to shoot off the handcuffs" when he struck Truesdale by accident. An employee with the sheriff's department conducted an internal investigation during which he interviewed other inmates and concluded that Evans's escape was planned, and that Evans intended to leap from a window when he thought his handcuffs would be removed in the courthouse.

On April 18, 1981, a jury of eight women and four men deliberated four hours before convicting Evans of capital murder in the shooting of William Truesdale. They had the choice of pursuing a sentence of life imprisonment or the death penalty, and they recommended the death penalty. On June 1, 1981, Circuit Court Judge Wiley R. Wright formally sentenced Evans to death, stating that the jury served as "the conscience of the community" and that "their verdict had to be given great weight." Immediately after the trial, Evans's attorney stated he would file for a new trial; in the meantime, Judge Wright initially scheduled Evans to be executed on September 1, 1981.

=== Early appeals and prosecutorial misconduct ===
Most of Evans's appeals were based on procedural errors and prosecutorial misconduct during his trial. In Virginia, to secure a death sentence against a defendant, it was necessary to prove that the defendant would pose an ongoing threat to society if they were to remain alive. The prosecutor in Evans's case, Alexandria Commonwealth Attorney John Kloch, argued in favor of a death sentence by showing the jury documentation that Evans had seven prior convictions. The documents motivated the jury to recommend the death penalty for Evans. In 1982, while Evans was on death row, his attorneys discovered that most of the convictions never occurred and that a computer error multiplied the number of convictions Evans had on his record, while other supposed convictions never made it to trial because their charges were dropped prior; further memos showed that Kloch was aware of the errors but used them to his advantage anyway.

On March 28, 1983, Virginia admitted error in Evans's sentencing. The same day, Virginia Governor Chuck Robb signed legislation providing the state with the ability to re-sentence Evans. The previous law, decided in the 1981 Supreme Court of Virginia case Patterson v. Commonwealth, would have required Virginia to reduce Evans's death sentence into a mandatory and automatic life sentence, but the new law overrode Patterson and made it possible for Evans to receive another death sentence. In a hearing on April 12, 1983, Kloch admitted that he knew the evidence he used against Evans was falsified. Evans's attorneys criticized the delay in Virginia officials admitting error in Evans's case, arguing that the state intentionally delayed the admission of error in Evans's case so that it would be affected by Robb's re-sentencing legislation.

In February 1984, Evans was granted a new sentencing hearing before a different jury from the one that had sentenced him to death. The second jury heard evidence that prosecutors did not introduce in the first trial to justify that Evans posed an ongoing threat to society, including the 1978 murder of Alton Collins, for which Evans never went to trial. The second jury re-sentenced Evans to death. In September 1983, a judge affirmed Evans's second death sentence, ruling that the prosecutors and state attorney general's office had not participated in intentional misconduct by waiting until the new law overriding Patterson went into effect before they admitted error in Evans's case.

=== Role in Mecklenburg death row escape ===
On May 31, 1984, six death row inmates escaped from Mecklenburg Correctional Center. Evans attended initial planning meetings for the escape months prior, but he eventually stopped and did not ultimately participate in the escape attempt. He and fellow death row inmate Willie Lloyd Turner remained behind, and while Turner helped some of the escaping inmates to break out of the prison, he and Evans also saved several prison staff members' lives during the escape, protecting them from other inmates who wanted to rape and murder them, like the Briley Brothers. Evans said he originally stood against a wall and stayed out of conflict until he saw inmates strip, bound, and begin sexually assaulting a nurse, at which point he stopped them and convinced them that it would be more difficult for them to negotiate for clemency if they harmed the guards they held hostage. One unidentified guard stated in a published report a few days after the escapes, "I owe my life, as do all the other [guards], to [Wilbert] Evans and [Willie] Turner." One of Evans's attorneys, Jonathan Shapiro, told the press, "This kind of behavior needs to be rewarded because it was the right thing to do. It's also right as a matter of policy to put the message out in putting down prison uprisings."

The widow of Evans's murder victim criticized efforts to paint Evans as a hero. As Evans's attorneys attempted to use his intervention in the escape attempt as evidence of his heroism and against the notion that Evans posed an ongoing threat, Truesdale's widow told a reporter, "I don't want this man, whether he lives or dies, to be a hero. He is not a hero. He is not a martyr in our lives." Truesdale's widow also questioned Evans's motives for protecting the guards, accusing Evans of engaging in a "ploy, to save the people to help save himself," although Evans's attorneys, a former administrator for the Virginia Department of Corrections, and a criminology professor from Virginia Commonwealth University who once worked as a corrections official insisted that Evans's motive did not matter, that "a life saved is a life saved," and rewarding Evans with mercy for his good behavior would provide encouragement for other inmates to improve their own behavior.

Governor Robb and the state prison director conducted an investigation into the prison escape; their investigation considered the roles the Evans and Turner had played in the escapes and protecting prison workers. Shapiro requested that the state parole board and Robb commute Evans's death sentence to life based on his role in protecting prison workers; Evans's legal team argued that his role in protecting guards during the prison escape demonstrated that he did not pose a future threat to society.

Evans's execution was later scheduled to take place in October 1990. U.S. District Judge Robert R. Merhige Jr. granted Evans a last-minute stay of execution on October 14 to hold a "minitrial" to investigate the claims that Evans protected guards during the Mecklenburg escape. Evans's attorneys also sent Governor Douglas Wilder 29 pages of poetry, essays, and songs Evans had written while on death row, as well as contests he entered and awards he had been granted for his poetry. Multiple corrections officials sent pleas on Evans's behalf to spare his life. The state attorney general's office protested the delay, stating that it was the role of the jurors and the governor to respectively dictate what sentence an inmate got and whether it should be commuted. The 4th U.S. Circuit Court of Appeals agreed with the attorney general's office and overruled Merhige's delay, and the U.S. Supreme Court refused to hear Evans's case.

== Execution and aftermath ==
In an interview the day of his execution, Evans apologized to Truesdale's family and expressed regret for Truesdale's murder. He said he wanted Truesdale's surviving family members to read his poetry to see how much he had changed and started caring about others while awaiting his execution. He also expressed regret for the crimes which he had committed in his youth. He donated his poetry to the NAACP so they could use the proceeds to help impoverished youth in low-income, majority-minority neighborhoods. The U.S. Supreme Court turned down Evans's final appeal at 7:30 pm that night, and Governor Douglas Wilder made no comment or gesture to commute the sentence, stating that he would only comment further if he decided to commute Evans's sentence. Wilder never commented, allowing Evans's execution to move forward.

Wilbert Evans was executed on October 17, 1990. Before he was led to the electric chair, he pocketed a copy of a plea on his behalf written by U.S. Supreme Court Justice Thurgood Marshall, in which Marshall called Evans's imminent execution "dead wrong" and said Evans's execution proved that the Supreme Court could not guarantee "that given sufficient procedural safeguards, the death penalty may be administered fairly and reliably." Marshall, an opponent of capital punishment, was the only Supreme Court Justice to vote against the decision to turn down Evans's appeal. Evans wrote on his copy of Marshall's dissent, "Please bury this with me."

=== Botched execution ===
At least three media witnesses at Evans's execution from the Richmond Times-Dispatch, The Virginian-Pilot, and The Alexandria Journal reported that after Evans received the first jolt of electricity, blood appeared to pour from his eyes, mouth, and nose. National Public Radio (NPR) and The Virginian-Pilot later called Evans's execution "one of the worst in Virginia's history." Virginia's prison chaplain Russ Ford, who witnessed Evans's execution, said he believed Evans's execution amounted to torture. Ford wrote in a recollection of Evans's execution that witnesses were audibly and visibly disturbed by the blood streaming down Evans's chin, onto his shirt, and onto the floor where it pooled. Evans was pronounced dead at 11:09 pm after two shocks were administered.

=== Officials' response and aftermath ===
Following Evans's execution, Virginia prison officials offered multiple explanations for what happened, including that Evans may have suffered a nosebleed from the pressure of the electricity striking him, that the mask that concealed his face was too small and applied pressure to his nose, and that Evans's last meal of pork caused hypertension. In an interview two days before his execution, Evans confirmed a family history of high blood pressure in stating that was his mother's cause of death.

An operations officer who presided over Evans's execution stated that Evans only experienced a nosebleed; she posited that witnesses believed blood came from other orifices on Evans's body because the shape of the mask placed over Evans's face forced blood to flow in a way that gave the impression that Evans's eyes and mouth were bleeding as well. Fred A. Leuchter, billed at the time as an "execution consultant for 16 states," said he did not believe in the operations officer's theory that the mask shape caused any misunderstanding amongst witnesses regarding the source of Evans's bleeding. The state medical examiner's office completed an autopsy which found that Evans's bleeding began from his right nostril.

One prison official posited that Evans experienced pain during his execution, stating, "Well, that's possible. When you touch a circuit, you're going to feel a little something." A reporter with United Press International who witnessed Evans's execution and who was reportedly "shaken" as he exited the prison said he believed Evans "may have felt some kind of pain." The same reporter said he heard Evans "moan or groan" after the first of the two shocks was administered, and the reporter found this emitted sound to be disturbing. The Virginia Department of Corrections insisted that Evans's execution went according to plan, with one prison official stating that authorities were certain the electric chair had functioned as intended because "there was no need to administer any additional surge of electricity; the machines involved operated properly," and offering that "different people react [to the electricity] differently."

Willie Lloyd Turner, who had helped Evans protect corrections officials during the Mecklenburg death row escape, was executed by lethal injection on May 25, 1995.

In May 2011, the Alexandria Adult Detention Center was formally renamed the William G. Truesdale ADC, in honor of Evans's victim. Later the same day, Truesdale's son was sworn in as Alexandria's new deputy sheriff.

=== NPR recordings and records ===
On January 19, 2023, NPR released photos, documents, and tape recordings of four executions in Virginia's electric chair: those of Richard Lee Whitley in 1987, Alton Waye in 1989, Richard T. Boggs in July 1990, and Evans. The tapes once belonged to a former corrections official who privately donated them to the Library of Virginia, Virginia's state library, in Richmond, in 2006; within the library, they were marked as "restricted." The tapes demonstrated Virginia corrections officials' unpreparedness during the four executions. The documents also contained a photograph of Evans which was taken less than three hours before his execution, showing him standing and facing the photographer with his head cleanly shaved. NPR noted that the corrections official who verbally dictated the progression of events during Evans's execution neglected to mention his bleeding, although her voice broke and she stammered during the time the bleeding would have taken place.

On May 11, 2023, NPR released further documentation surrounding Virginia's execution process; this further documentation included additional photographs of Evans, also taken within three hours of his death, as he stood in different poses and positions from the ones released in January. NPR stated that each photo depicted Evans as "he scratches his chin, raises his eyes, turns on his side and slumps his shoulders." The documents also contained information on and photographs of Earl Clanton (executed in 1988) and Buddy Justus (executed in December 1990).

== See also ==
- Capital punishment in Virginia
- List of botched executions
- List of people executed in Virginia
- List of people executed in the United States in 1990
