= Jerry Givens =

American chief executioner of Virginia (1952–2020)

- Born: Jerry Bronson Givens; December 3, 1952; Richmond, Virginia, U.S.
- Died: April 13, 2020 (aged 67); Richmond, Virginia, U.S.
- Occupations: Executioner; activist
- Employer: Virginia Department of Corrections

Chief executioner of Virginia
- In office 1982–1999

Jerry Bronson Givens (December 3, 1952 – April 13, 2020) was the chief executioner of Virginia from 1982 until 1999, during which he executed 62 people, including two of the Briley Brothers. He spent most of his career in Virginia's correctional system, and was initially a supporter of capital punishment. However, beginning in 1999, he served a four-year prison sentence for money laundering and perjury, the latter of which is a felony in the Commonwealth of Virginia. This led to the termination of his career at the Virginia Department of Corrections and the loss of his title as Chief Executioner of Virginia. This experience, together with the revelation that Earl Washington Jr. was innocent, transformed Givens into an outspoken opponent of the death penalty, which he spent the rest of his life campaigning against. He died from COVID-19 during the COVID-19 pandemic.

== Early life ==
Givens was born December 3, 1952, in Richmond, Virginia, the youngest of his working-class parents' four children. He lost his father to drugs. As a teenager, he witnessed a young woman, whom he had been about to ask to dance, shot to death at a party. He attended Johnson C. Smith University on a football scholarship, but dropped out after suffering an injury. As a young man, he wanted to be a police officer. He worked at a Phillip Morris tobacco plant, but lost his job after a fight with a co-worker. Thereafter, he was hired as a guard at the Virginia State Penitentiary. In 1973 or 1974, he married Sadie Travers.

== Chief executioner ==
In 1982, Virginia's chief executioner retired, and Givens was promoted to the position. During the next seventeen years, he executed 62 people—25 by electric chair and, beginning in 1994, 37 by lethal injection. He found the latter method more upsetting, commenting in 2019 that "[w]hen it comes down to pushing that button, the only thing you could hear was the machine humming, but when it comes down to lethal injection you got the syringe in your hand and you're watching the chemicals go down in a plastic tube into his arm. You feel more attached." Among those he executed were the spree killers Linwood and James Briley. He was also scheduled to execute Earl Washington Jr., but Washington's death sentence was stayed pending his appeal before ultimately being commuted by Governor Douglas Wilder to life imprisonment in 1994.

He did not speak to friends or family about his work, and they did not know that he was an executioner for many years. His sister explained, "We were just thinking he was a guard." His wife only learned that he was an executioner in 1999. In addition, the majority of his family was against the death penalty. His sister said: "It hurt me because I’m against the death penalty. My whole family is. I tried to blot it out of my mind. I tried not to think about it, but sometimes I would, and I’d think, ‘Oh, he killed 62 people.’”

Though he was initially a supporter of capital punishment (he had volunteered to assist in executions, prior to his appointment as chief executioner), he said that executing people left him "in a daze", and that he "[felt] for the condemned man's family". He did not enjoy executions, but described himself as "addicted" to them. He intended to give up his role after his one hundredth execution. He prayed with the condemned before their executions, and they often confessed their crimes to him.

Givens was forced to resign as chief executioner in 1999 as a result of criminal charges against him.

== Legal troubles and change of heart ==
In 1999, Givens was convicted of perjury and money laundering, arising from his purchase of a vehicle using money he was alleged to have known came from the sale of illegal drugs. He maintained his innocence, blaming a childhood friend who he said he had thought turned his life around, but served four years in prison. While there, Givens—already a religious man—devoted himself to reading the Bible and contemplating Jesus Christ's teachings on forgiveness. It was also while he was in prison that he learned that Earl Washington Jr. was innocent and had been exonerated by DNA testing. This revelation had a major effect on Givens' thinking: he described God answering his prayers "by taking me to prison and taking Earl Washington out."

A few years after his release from prison, Givens connected with Jon Sheldon, a capital defense lawyer who was on the board of Virginians for Alternatives to the Death Penalty. Sheldon commented, "I remember thinking to myself, 'Man, this guy has PTSD.'" By that point, Givens had mixed feelings about his role as an executioner. Eventually, Givens turned against the death penalty.

== Advocacy work ==
On his release from prison, Givens got a job as truck driver for a company that installed and repaired guardrails. He also dedicated himself to campaigning against the death penalty. He served on the board of Virginians for Alternatives to the Death Penalty, and on the board of advisors of Death Penalty Action. He addressed the Virginia General Assembly in 2010, where he was credited by Chap Petersen with helping to defeat a bill to expand the death penalty to accomplices of murders, and the World Congress Against the Death Penalty in Brussels in 2019. In 2012, Givens went on a speaking tour, in support of Proposition 34, a California ballot measure to abolish the death penalty. He also authored memoirs, Another Day Is Not Promised, published in 2012. He described his advocacy work as "a mission from God". Givens was known to send letters to governors before high-profile executions. He would also conduct outreach in towns close to prisons, where he could connect with corrections officers.

== Death ==
In mid-March 2020, Givens began to feel sick. It is thought that he potentially contracted coronavirus at a revival at Cedar Street Baptist Church in early March. At least one revival attendee later tested positive for the virus. He was initially diagnosed with pneumonia and given antibiotics, but his condition worsened. He was then admitted to the hospital, where he tested positive for coronavirus and was put on a ventilator. Givens died April 13, 2020, at a hospital in Richmond, from complications of COVID-19. He was 67.
