= Montie Rissell =

American serial killer and rapist

- Rissell c. 1977
- Born: Montie Ralph Rissell; November 28, 1958 (age 67); Wellington, Kansas, U.S.
- Other name: Monte
- Conviction: First degree murder
- Penalty: Life imprisonment

Details
- Victims: 5 murders, 12 rape victims
- Span of crimes: August 4, 1976 – May 1977
- Country: United States
- State: Virginia
- Date apprehended: May 18, 1977
- Imprisoned at: Lawrenceville Correctional Center

Montie Ralph Rissell (born November 28, 1958), also known as Monte, is an American serial killer and rapist who raped and murdered five women between 1976 and 1977 in Alexandria, Virginia, where he lived.

== Early life ==
Rissell lived the first seven years of his life in his hometown of Wellington, Kansas. Rissell lived with his mother, who was married and divorced twice by the time Rissell was 12. Rissell's biological father left the home when Rissell was seven years old. Rissell had two older siblings: a brother, Harold, and a sister.

By the age of 14, Rissell had committed his first rape. He was charged with a series of petty crimes and was institutionalized in 1973. Shortly after his release in 1975, he was arrested for attempted robbery when, armed with a knife, he attempted to rob a woman in an elevator near his home. He received a five-year suspended sentence and dropped out of T. C. Williams High School at the age of 17.

== Murders ==
On August 4, 1976, Rissell saw 26-year-old Aura Marina Gabor, a sex worker living in the same apartment complex as Rissell on the 400 block of North Armistead Street in Alexandria. Rissell claimed he grew angry with her after she "allowed" him to have sex with her and she made it seem like she enjoyed it, so he drowned her in a nearby ravine.

The second murder occurred in March 1977, when Rissell raped and stabbed 22-year-old McDonald's manager trainee, Ursula Miltenberger, near the Hamlet Apartments. Her body was found March 6 in a wooded area in Fairfax County.

The third murder victim was 27-year-old Gladys Ross Bradley, a post office clerk and resident of Hamlet Apartments. Sometime in April 1977, Rissell waited outside her house with a steak knife from his mother's kitchen. He raped her twice, then dragged her by her feet to a nearby creek, where he then drowned her. Her body was found April 29, 1977.

The fourth murder victim was 34-year-old Aletha Byrd, a personnel counselor at the Woodward & Lothrop department store at Tysons Corner Center. Aletha had been missing from her home since April 10, 1977. She was found dead with multiple stab wounds on May 17 in a wooded area.

The fifth and final victim was 24-year-old Jeanette McClelland, a graphics design proofreader at Bru-El Graphics and also a resident of Hamlet Apartments. She was found raped and stabbed 100 times in a culvert near Shirley Highway on May 5, 1977. On May 18, police (who had Rissell under surveillance due to his being a suspect) searched Rissell's car and found Byrd's wallet, keys, and comb. Police later confirmed that Rissell's fingerprints were found on Miltenberger's car. Rissell confessed to killing all five women.

Rissell was charged with abducting, raping and murdering the five women. However, because he pleaded guilty to the murder charges, the abduction and rape charges were dropped. Rissell was sentenced to five consecutive life sentences on October 11, 1977. He was 18 years old at the time of his sentencing.

== Prison ==
While in prison, Rissell wrote a 461-page handwritten manuscript detailing his murders.

In June 1989, Rissell was among the largest group of community college graduates in the Virginia Penal System, along with 11 other inmates. They graduated with an associate degree in Arts & Sciences from Southside Virginia Community College.

Rissell became eligible for parole in 1995, which was heavily protested by the victims' family members and the community. Since then, Rissell has been granted an annual parole hearing each November; he has been denied parole each time.

As of 2026, Rissell is incarcerated at Lawrenceville Correctional Center.

== Popular culture ==
Rissell was featured in season 1, episode 4 of the 2017 Netflix crime drama, Mindhunter; actor Sam Strike portrayed him.

== See also ==
- List of serial killers in the United States
