= Joseph Giarratano =

American murderer (1957–2024)

- Born: Joseph M. Giarratano; August 26, 1957; New York City, New York, U.S.
- Died: October 6, 2024 (aged 67); Charlottesville, Virginia, U.S.
- Occupation: Scallop fisherman
- Status: Deceased
- Convictions: Capital murder First degree murder Rape
- Penalty: Death; commuted to life imprisonment

Details
- Victims: Barbara Ann Kline, 44; Michelle Kline, 15
- Date: February 4, 1979
- State: Virginia

Joseph M. Giarratano (August 26, 1957 – October 6, 2024) was an American murderer and prisoner who served in Deerfield Correctional Center in Southampton County, Virginia, and was on death row until having his sentence commuted to life imprisonment. On November 21, 2017, he was granted parole. He was convicted, based on circumstantial evidence and his own confessions, of murdering Toni Kline and raping and strangling her 15-year-old daughter Michelle on February 4, 1979, in Norfolk, Virginia. He had said that he was an addict for years and had blacked out on alcohol and drugs, waking to find the bodies. He was sentenced to death, and incarcerated on death row for 12 years at the former Virginia State Penitentiary.

Giarratano is notable for having become a serious legal scholar, helping mount litigation to explore constitutional rights of prisoners. Defense attorneys had mounted appeals to re-open his case in the late 1980s, based on what they said was new information, e.g. head and pubic hairs, sperm, finger prints, and bloody boot prints did not match Giarratano. He lost state and federal appeals due to procedural rules that barred review of errors that were not objected to at the time of trial. The case attracted international attention as his execution date was scheduled for February 1991. Three days before the execution date, Governor Douglas Wilder commuted Giarratano's death sentence to life in prison with the possibility of parole after 25 years imprisonment (after 13 years with allowance for time served). Mary Sue Terry, the state Attorney General, refused to seek a retrial, stating that she was confident that Giarratano was guilty of killing Kline and her daughter.

== Background ==
Born in The Bronx on August 26, 1957, Giarratano grew up in circumstances described by The New York Times as similar to those of many juvenile offenders: "a fractured family, an abusive mother, a father he did not meet until they were inmates in the same Florida prison 16 years ago. It also includes an early exit from school and an even earlier introduction to drugs." He became a scallop fisherman in Hampton Roads, Virginia.

Giarratano said that he woke in the Kline apartment after a blackout and found the two women dead. In a 1991 interview, he said that he assumed he killed them, but did not know. He fled to Florida. Feeling guilt, he turned himself in to police, and confessed to the murders. The trial was quick, and he was convicted and sentenced to death for the two murders. He later recanted his confessions.

== Death row ==
While on death row at Mecklenburg Correctional Center, Giarratano became free of his addiction, and also of the tranquilizer prescribed by prison doctors. After being introduced to law by another inmate, he began to study it intensively, becoming interested in constitutional law.

Giarratano became noted as a legal scholar published in the Yale Law Journal and assisted other prisoners with their cases. In addition, he sought to widen prisoners' rights, including to right of counsel, with an argument that was approved by the federal court of appeals but not the US Supreme Court. He worked to improve conditions in Virginia prisons, fighting for "increased access for visitors and confidentiality of communications with lawyers." He later developed as a scholar of constitutional law. It gave him purpose, and he began to help other prisoners. He helped file habeas corpus petitions for himself and several other prisoners.

He was involved in preparing arguments for Murray v. Giarratano, 492 U.S. 1 (1989), which reached the United States Supreme Court. It was an effort to enlarge the right to counsel. This argument was upheld at the federal appeals court level, but in Murray v. Giarratano, the Supreme Court ruled that there is no constitutional right to appointed counsel in state habeas corpus proceedings, and that the rule applies equally to capital cases.

Giarratano was involved in a 1984 escape attempt with seven other men from the Mecklenburg prison. Prison officials had an internal hearing and dealt with the men on an institutional basis.

=== Advocate for Earl Washington, Jr. ===
Giarratano was an advocate for fellow death row inmate Earl Washington Jr., and gained support for a pro bono defense of him less than a month before his execution scheduled for September 1985. He noted that Washington had an intellectual disability, which had not been considered at his trial or sentencing, and enlisted the help of Marie Deans and her network. Counsel gained a stay to enable an appeal. Newly available DNA testing, conducted post-conviction in 1993, called into question whether Washington had committed the crime for which he had been sentenced to death. Because Virginia law severely limits when new evidence may be introduced post-conviction, his conviction was upheld. However, Governor Douglas Wilder in January 1994 commuted Washington's sentence from death to life imprisonment.

Based on additional DNA testing in 2000, which was more accurate, Washington was fully exonerated. He received a full pardon from Governor James Gilmore and was released from prison. In 2006, he won a settlement from the estate of Agent Wilmore, who had coerced the false confession.

== Appeals ==
In the late 1980s, counsel investigating Giarratano's case noted the conflicts among his five confessions and new evidence that suggested he did not commit the crimes. Stab wounds were inflicted by a right-handed person, but Giarratano was left-handed. A hair sample and sperm sample that were found on the rape victim did not match Giarratano's, and bloody shoe prints found near the scene of the crime did not match Giarratano's. Nor did numerous fingerprints. The official autopsy report was altered after Giarratano made an official statement.

Defense attempts were made to appeal this case and re-open the case to introduce the contradictory evidence. Virginia has what defense attorneys characterize as strict procedural rules "severely limiting the introduction of new evidence and raising of objections after the trial". The prosecutor said they were trying to rework the evidence. The United States Court of Appeals for the Fourth Circuit, in Richmond, turned down his appeal in late 1989, and in 1990, Giarratano was seeking a hearing by the United States Supreme Court.

In February 1991, Giarratano's death sentence was commuted to life, with a pardon sentencing him to life imprisonment with a recommendation for new trial, and possibility of parole after 25 years (given the time already served, this made Giarratano eligible for parole in 13 years.) The Virginia Attorney General rejected his appeal for a new trial stating that evidence of innocence is irrelevant under Virginia's procedural rules.

== Life sentence and parole ==
Following commutation of his sentence, Giarratano was transferred among different prisons, first in Virginia. After being stabbed at one, he was transferred to prison in Utah and then to Illinois, under a state compact. He was returned to Virginia in March 1997. His counsel was seeking to locate physical evidence from the crime scene in 2004 in order to conduct DNA testing prior to his appeal to gain parole that year, the first time he would be eligible. Norfolk and state authorities have said they believe all the biological evidence in the Kline case was destroyed.

Giarratano was reassigned to the general prison population at Augusta Correctional Institution. There he set up a 14-week course at the prison on non-violence, with the help of columnist Colman McCarthy of the Washington Post, who had founded the Center for Teaching Peace. NBC nightly news covered the non-violence program; it received donations, including a grant from the Catholic Campaign for Human Development. The program was closed in 1995, due to "financial improprieties". The Department of Corrections later retracted the allegations as reported by the media. Giarrantano says that prison officials did not like it.

Officials transferred Giarrantano for a time to the mental health unit at the Powhatan Correctional Center, then to the Buckingham Correctional Center. He was stabbed by another inmate and has asserted that officials spread the word that he was a "snitch", which they deny. They eventually moved him to a prison in Utah, for his own protection. It was later reported in the Richmond Times Dispatch that he was transferred to Utah Supermax because the Virginia Corrections Director "had a politically hot prisoner that he wanted get rid of". He was transferred to Joliet, Illinois, and returned to Virginia in March 1997. He had kept communication with supporters at Amnesty International and other groups.

Giarratano recanted his confessions and was seeking parole when he was first eligible in the spring of 2004. Supporters still sought his freedom. In 2004, the state said they could not find any of the physical evidence collected from the crime scene in 1979, and "Norfolk and Virginia authorities have maintained that the biological evidence in Giarratano's case was destroyed years ago." At a hearing in 2004, his counsel was seeking this physical evidence in order to conduct DNA testing to exclude Giarratano from the scene. That forensic testing had not been available in 1979.

On November 21, 2017, Giarratano was granted parole. He died at his home in Charlottesville on October 6, 2024, at the age of 67.
