= Sorrell v. IMS Health Inc. =

- Supreme Court of the United States

Argued April 26, 2011 Decided June 27, 2011
- Full case name: Sorrell, Attorney General of Vermont, et al. v. IMS Health Inc. et al.
- Docket no.: 10-779
- Citations: 564 U.S. 552 (more) 131 S. Ct. 2653; 180 L. Ed. 2d 544; 2011 U.S. LEXIS 4794
- Argument: Oral argument

Case history
- Prior: Judgement for defendants, 631 F. Supp. 2d 434 (D. Vt. 2009); reversed and remanded, 630 F.3d 263 (2nd Cir. 2010); cert. granted, 562 U.S. 1127 (2011).

Holding
- A Vermont statute that restricted the sale, disclosure, and use of records that revealed the prescribing practices of individual doctors violated the First Amendment.

Court membership
- Chief Justice John Roberts Associate Justices Antonin Scalia · Anthony Kennedy; Clarence Thomas · Ruth Bader Ginsburg; Stephen Breyer · Samuel Alito; Sonia Sotomayor · Elena Kagan

Case opinions
- Majority: Kennedy, joined by Roberts, Scalia, Thomas, Alito, Sotomayor
- Dissent: Breyer, joined by Ginsburg, Kagan

Laws applied
- U.S. Const. amend. I

Sorrell v. IMS Health Inc., 564 U.S. 552 (2011), is a United States Supreme Court case in which the Court held that a Vermont statute that restricted the sale, disclosure, and use of records that revealed the prescribing practices of individual doctors violated the First Amendment. (Note: "Vermont law restricts the sale, disclosure, and use of pharmacy records that reveal the prescribing practices of individual doctors... Speech in aid of pharmaceutical marketing, however, is a form of expression protected by the Free Speech Clause of the First Amendment. As a consequence, Vermont’s statute must be subjected to heightened judicial scrutiny. The law cannot satisfy that standard.", Page 1.)

== Background ==
In 2007, Vermont passed the Prescription Confidentiality Law that required, among other things, that records containing a doctor's prescribing practices not be sold or used for marketing purposes unless the doctor consented. The law was a response to a Vermont Medical Society resolution stating that using the prescribing history of doctors in marketing was an intrusion into the way doctors practice medicine. The Vermont Medical Society had found that the marketing efforts of pharmaceutical companies used in large part the data of individual doctors' prescribing patterns, sold to the companies by pharmacies without the doctors' consent and successfully lobbied the Vermont legislature to enact the law.

Data mining companies and pharmaceutical manufactures contended that the law violated their First Amendment rights and sought declaratory and injunctive relief against Vermont officials. (Note: "The present case involves two consolidated suits. One was brought by three Vermont data miners, the other by an association of pharmaceutical manufacturers that produce brand-name drugs. These entities are the respondents here. Contending that [the Prescription Confidentiality Law] violates their First Amendment rights as incorporated by the Fourteenth Amendment, the respondents sought declaratory and injunctive relief against the petitioners, the Attorney General and other officials of the State of Vermont.", pp 5-6.) The United States District Court for the District of Vermont denied relief; the plaintiffs appealed to the United States Court of Appeals for the Second Circuit which reversed, holding that the law violated the First Amendment by restricting the speech of the companies without adequate justification. (Note: "After a bench trial, the United States District Court for the District of Vermont denied relief.... The United States Court of Appeals for the Second Circuit reversed and remanded. It held that [the Prescription Confidentiality Law] violates the First Amendment by burdening the speech of pharmaceutical marketers and data miners without an adequate justification.", p 6.) Vermont's Attorney General appealed to the Supreme Court, which granted certiorari to resolve the contradiction of a ruling of the United States Court of Appeals for the First Circuit, which had upheld similar laws in New Hampshire and Maine, concluding that the laws regulated economic conduct, not commercial speech.

== Opinion ==
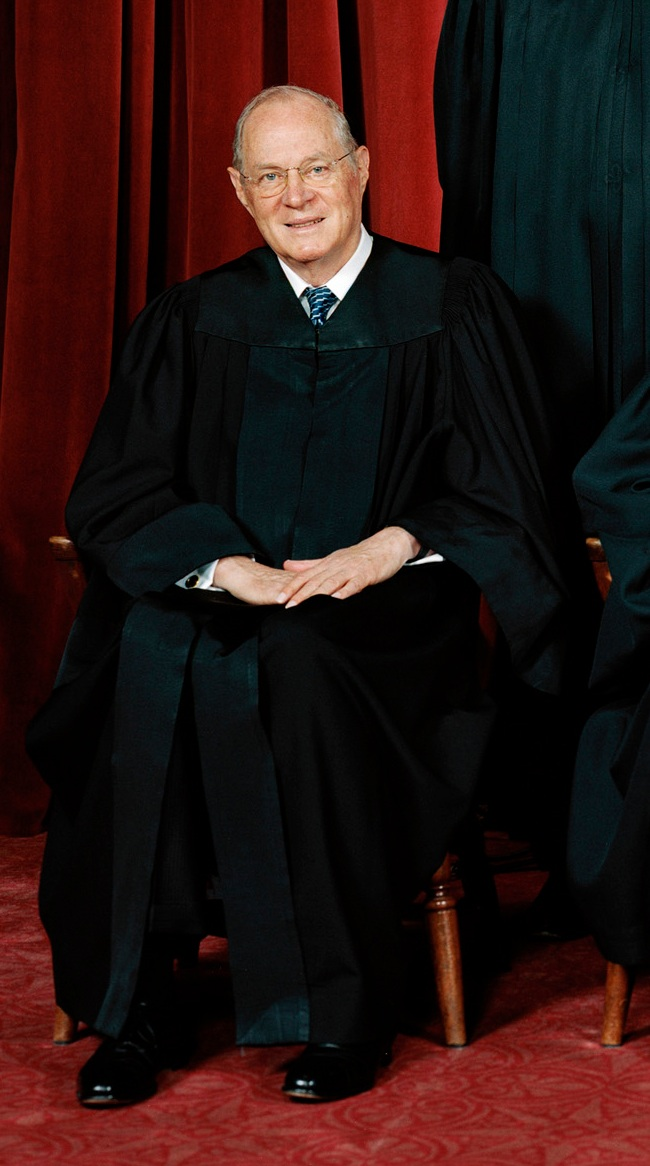
Justice Kennedy, the author of the Court's opinion.

Associate Justice Anthony Kennedy delivered the opinion of the Court, which Chief Justice Roberts, Justice Scalia, Justice Thomas, Justice Alito, and Justice Sotomayor joined. The Court held that the law violated the First Amendment and affirmed the judgment of the Court of Appeals.

The first finding of the Court was that the law placed content and speaker based restrictions on speech. (Note: "On its face, Vermont’s law enacts content and speaker based restrictions on the sale, disclosure, and use of prescriber-identifying information.", p 8.) Citing Cincinnati v. Discovery Network, Inc., the Court noted that these restrictions warranted heightened judicial scrutiny. (Note: "Act 80 is designed to impose a specific, content-based burden on protected expression. It follows that heightened judicial scrutiny is warranted. See Cincinnati v. Discovery Network, Inc", p 9.)

The Court rejected Vermont's argument that the law was only a commercial regulation and not a regulation of speech on the grounds that the law imposed more than an incidental burden on speech. (Note: "[the law] imposes more than an incidental burden on protected expression. Both on its face and in its practical operation, Vermont’s law imposes a burden based on the content of speech and the identity of the speaker.", p 11.)

The second and final finding of the Court was that Vermont did not meet its burden to justify its content-based law as consistent with the First Amendment. According to Board of Trustees, State Univ. of N. Y. v. Fox, Vermont must demonstrate that the law directly advances a substantial government interest. (Note: "To sustain the targeted, content-based burden [the law] imposes on protected expression, the State must show at least that the statute directly advances a substantial governmental interest", p 16.) The Court rejected Vermont's claims that the law was necessary to protect medical privacy and achieve improved public healthcare. (Note: "The State’s asserted justifications for [the law] come under two general headings. First, the State contends that its law is necessary to protect medical privacy, including physician confidentiality, avoidance of harassment, and the integrity of the doctor-patient relationship. Second, the State argues that [the law] is integral to the achievement of policy objectives—namely, improved public health and reduced healthcare costs. Neither justification withstands scrutiny.", pp 16-17.)

=== Dissent ===
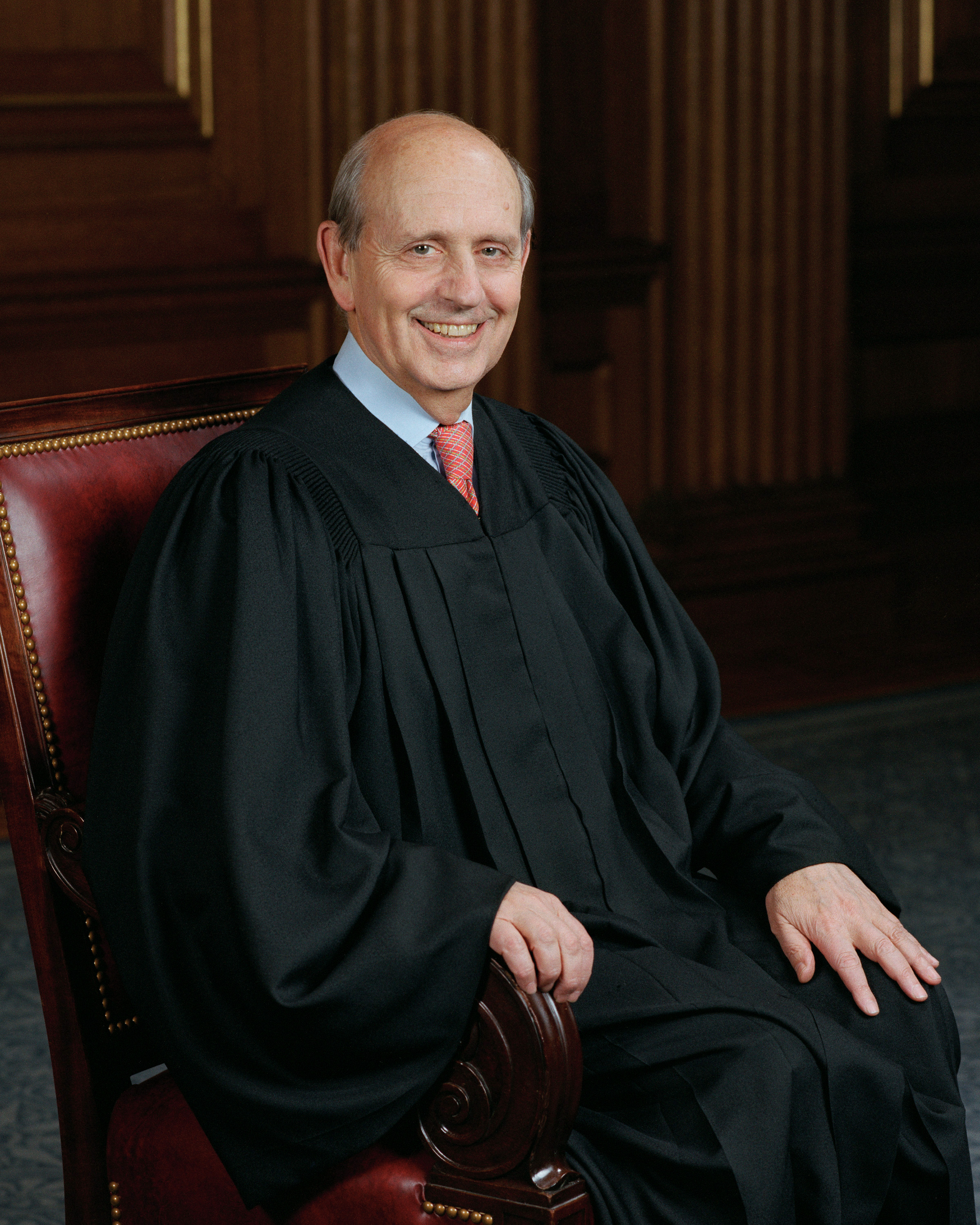
Justice Breyer, the author of the opinion for the dissent.

Associate Justice Stephen Breyer wrote a dissenting opinion, which Justice Ginsburg and Justice Kagan joined. Breyer argued that the law should be reviewed as an economic regulation, not under a heightened standard applied for First Amendment issues. Breyer found that the legitimate regulatory objectives outweighed the small harm done to First Amendment interests. (Note: "I would ask whether Vermont’s regulatory provisions work harm to First Amendment interests that is disproportionate to their furtherance of legitimate regulatory objectives. And in doing so, I would give significant weight to legitimate commercial regulatory objectives- as this Court did in 'Glickman'. The far stricter, specially 'heightened' First Amendment standards that the majority would apply to this instance of commercial regulation are out of place here.", p 2.) Breyer also noted that applying a strict First Amendment standard whenever a legislative program burdened speech would give judges the power to choose to undermine or support legislative efforts. (Note: "to apply a 'heightened' First Amendment standard of review whenever such a program burdens speech would transfer from legislatures to judges the primary power to weigh ends and to choose means, threatening to distort or undermine legitimate legislative objectives.", p 5.)
