= Murray v. Giarratano =

- Supreme Court of the United States

Argued March 22, 1989 Decided June 23, 1989
- Full case name: Edward W. Murray, Director of the Virginia Department of Corrections v. Joseph M. Giarratano
- Citations: 492 U.S. 1 (more)
- Argument: Oral argument

Case history
- Prior: Judgment for plaintiff, 668 F. Supp. 511 (E.D. Va., 1986); reversed on appeal, 836 F.2d 1421 (4th Cir. 1988); district court affirmed in en banc rehearing, 847 F.2d 1118 (4th Cir. 1988)

Holding
- Neither the Eighth Amendment nor the Due Process Clause requires States to appoint counsel for indigent death row inmates seeking state postconviction relief. United States Court of Appeals for the Fourth Circuit reversed and remanded.

Court membership
- Chief Justice William Rehnquist Associate Justices William J. Brennan Jr. · Byron White; Thurgood Marshall · Harry Blackmun; John P. Stevens · Sandra Day O'Connor; Antonin Scalia · Anthony Kennedy

Case opinions
- Plurality: Rehnquist, joined by White, O'Connor, Scalia
- Concurrence: O'Connor
- Concurrence: Kennedy (in judgment), joined by O'Connor
- Dissent: Stevens, joined by Brennan, Marshall, Blackmun

Murray v. Giarratano, 492 U.S. 1 (1989), is a United States Supreme Court case in which the Court held that capital defendants do not have a constitutional right to counsel in state collateral postconviction proceedings.

== Background ==
The case originated in a § 1983 class action lawsuit brought by death row inmate Joseph M. Giarratano in the United States District Court for the Eastern District of Virginia. Giarratano alleged that he and other death row inmates had a constitutional right to counsel in collateral proceedings challenging their convictions and sentences, and that the state of Virginia was not meeting its obligations to guarantee this right. The District Court agreed that Virginia was not meeting its constitutional obligations and ordered it to appoint postconviction counsel for indigent death row inmates who sought to file habeas corpus petitions. On appeal, a divided three-judge panel of the United States Court of Appeals for the Fourth Circuit reversed the district court's ruling. This panel's ruling, in turn, was reversed by the full Fourth Circuit sitting en banc, which upheld the District Court's ruling in Giarratano's favor.

== Supreme Court decision ==
The Supreme Court voted 5–4 to reverse the en banc Fourth Circuit on the grounds that, under the circumstances of the case, Virginia had taken adequate steps to make counsel available to indigent death row inmates. The plurality opinion was authored by Justice William Rehnquist and joined by three other justices. Justice Anthony Kennedy wrote an opinion concurring in the judgment only, stating:

While Virginia has not adopted procedures for securing representation that are as far reaching and effective as those available in other States, no prisoner on death row in Virginia has been unable to obtain counsel to represent him in postconviction proceedings, and Virginia's prison system is staffed with institutional lawyers to assist in preparing petitions for postconviction relief. I am not prepared to say that this scheme violates the Constitution.

The dissenting opinion was authored by Justice John Paul Stevens and joined by three other justices. Because all four dissenting justices argued that there was a right to government-appointed counsel in capital postconviction proceedings, and because Kennedy's concurrence also endorsed the existence of this right, some legal commentators have argued that Giarratano did not rule that there was no right to counsel in such proceedings. For example, Eric M. Freedman states that "[t]o read Giarratano as holding that states have no obligation to provide postconviction counsel to death row inmates is to misread it. On the contrary, five, and perhaps six, Justices plainly believed that states do have such an obligation."
