= Coffeewood Correctional Center =

State prison in Virginia, US

Coordinates: 38°21′54″N 78°01′10″W

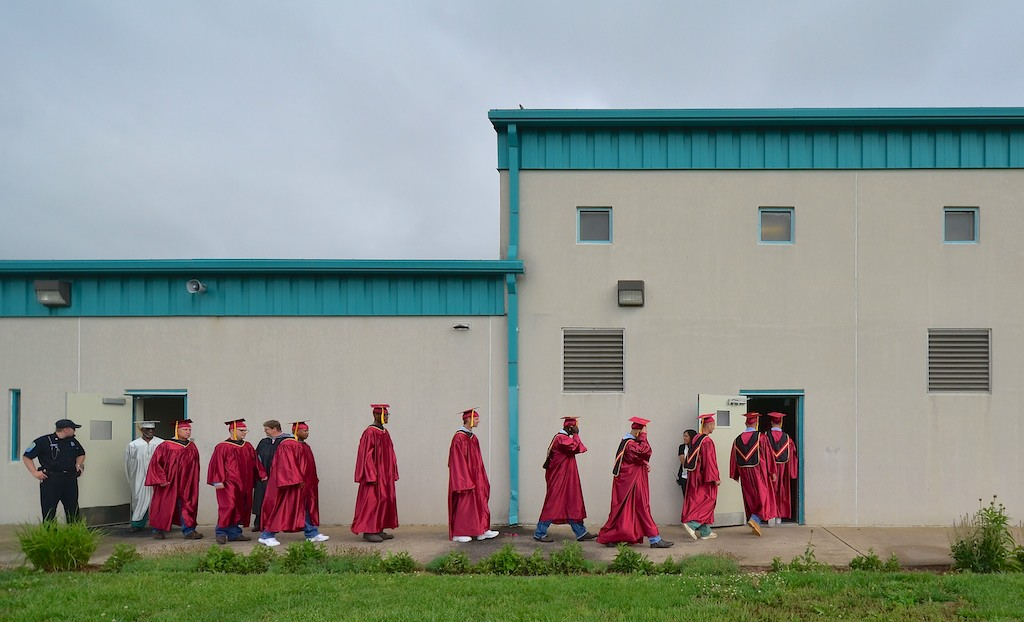
- Graduation of Germanna Community College student inmates
- Interactive map of Coffeewood Correctional Center
- Location: 12352 Coffeewood Drive Mitchells, Virginia
- Status: Operational
- Security class: level 2 (medium)
- Capacity: 1,193
- Population: 963 (June 4, 2025)
- Opened: 1994
- Managed by: Virginia Department of Corrections

Coffeewood Correctional Center is a state prison for men located in Mitchells, Culpeper County, Virginia, owned and operated by the Virginia Department of Corrections.

The facility was opened in 1994 and has a working capacity of 1,193 prisoners held at a level 2 (medium) security level.
