= Thomas Brooks III =

American convicted murderer and fugitive

- Brooks at the Virginia State Penitentiary in 1968
- Born: August 8, 1948 (age 78); Newport News, Virginia, U.S.
- Status: Escaped
- Conviction: First degree murder
- Penalty: 20 years imprisonment
- Escaped: August 24, 1970

Details
- Victims: Milton Carey Powell, 68 (as an accomplice)
- Date: April 3, 1968
- Country: United States
- Location: Newport News, Virginia

Thomas Brooks III (born August 8, 1948) is a convicted American murderer and fugitive who is wanted by the Virginia Department of Corrections (VADOC). On April 3, 1968, Brooks, then 19, and three other young men participated in the robbery and murder of a man in Newport News, Virginia. Brooks, who had served as a lookout, was convicted as an accomplice to the murder and sentenced to 20 years in prison. In August 1970, Brooks walked away from a prison work crew. He was never recaptured. His case is currently the oldest one on the VADOC's most wanted list.

== Crime and trial ==
Around 5:15 p.m. on April 3, 1968, 68-year-old Milton Carey Powell was closing his hardware store on Roanoke Avenue in Newport News when two teenagers walked in, fatally shot him, and made off with $400. The shooting was witnessed by Milton's brother, Allen Powell. Four teenagers were arrested and charged in the case five days later. They were 19-year-old Clarence Alexander Spratley, who was the triggerman, 19-year-old Thomas Brooks, 18-year-old Raymond Hill, and an unnamed 17-year-old boy. Spratley was also charged with two counts of armed robbery, one count of attempted armed robbery, and three counts of attempted murder for several other crimes he had committed. Prosecutors made a deal with Hill for him to testify against his co-defendants in exchange for not being prosecuted.

Brooks was tried first. During the trial, Hill testified that Brooks, who was found with a revolver when he was arrested, gave a gun to Spratley and was given $10 after the robbery. Brooks took the stand and claimed he left the gun without believing he was participating in a robbery and that he was not in the area at the time of the murder. However, Hill said Brooks was present and heard his two co-defendants laughing about "hitting" Powell.

On June 14, 1968, Brooks was found guilty of first-degree murder for his participation in the robbery. After his lawyers said he had only been a lookout, the jury recommended the most lenient sentence possible, 20 years in prison.

Spratley went on trial in November 1968. Allen Powell testified against him during the trial. Spratley was found guilty of first degree murder after a two-day trial. Prosecution sought a death sentence in his case, but the jury gave him a life sentence after deliberating for three hours and 35 minutes. In January 1969, Spratley received a concurrent 55-year sentence for two counts of armed robbery and one count of attempted armed robbery. He was presumably paroled in the 1980s or 1990s.

== Brooks's escape ==
After Brooks was found guilty of murder, he was sent to the Virginia State Penitentiary in Richmond to serve out his sentence. He lost his appeal to the Virginia Supreme Court in March 1969.

Brooks was eventually assigned to the Nansemond Correctional Field Unit in Isle of Wight County. On the morning of August 24, 1970, Brooks was part of a work crew clearing ditches alongside Virginia State Route 662 when he suddenly decided to walk away. He is currently the oldest case on the most wanted list for the Virginia Department of Corrections. To this day, authorities have not found any clues to Brooks's whereabouts.

== See also ==
- List of fugitives from justice who disappeared
