= River North Correctional Center =

State prison in Independence, Virginia

Coordinates: 36°36′54″N 81°07′37″W

- Interactive map of River North Correctional Center
- Location: 329 Dellbrook Lane Independence, Virginia
- Status: open
- Security class: medium
- Capacity: 1024
- Opened: 2013
- Managed by: Virginia Department of Corrections

The River North Correctional Center is a state prison for men located in Independence, Grayson County, Virginia, owned and operated by the Virginia Department of Corrections.

The facility was opened in 2013 and has a working capacity of 1024 prisoners held at a medium security level.

In November 2025, an inmate killed a corrections officer.

== Notable inmates ==
| Inmate Name | Register Number | Status | Details |
|---|---|---|---|
| Dennis Bowman | 2063396 | Serving multiple life sentences. | Subject of a Netflix Documentary. Found guilty of second degree murder of his adopted daughter |
| Rodney Lamont Fuller | 1144992 | Serving a life sentence. | One of two men who were hired by Teresa Lewis to murder her husband and stepson. |
| David Wayne Hoshaw Jr. | 1435526 | Serving two life sentences. | Convicted of the murders of Angelique Goyena and her mother, Vonda. |
| Peter Odighizuwa | 1090193 | Serving 6 life sentences. | Perpetrator of the 2002 Appalachian School of Law shooting in which he murdered faculty members Anthony Sutin and Thomas Blackwell, as well as student Angela Dales. |
| Marquie Brandon Williams | 1969748 | Serving a life sentence. | Convicted in the murder of his girlfriend Lisa Henderson. |
| Travis Ryan Brown | 1531479 | Serving a life sentence. | Convicted in the murder of 3 year old Khaleesi Cuthriell |
