= Briley brothers =

Sibling American spree/serial killers – 1971 and 1979

Linwood Earl Briley James Dyral Briley Jr. Anthony Ray Briley
- Linwood and James Briley
- Born: Linwood; March 26, 1954; Richmond, Virginia, U.S. James; June 6, 1956; Richmond, Virginia, U.S. Anthony; February 17, 1958 (age 68); Richmond, Virginia, U.S.
- Died: Linwood; October 12, 1984 (aged 30); Virginia State Penitentiary, Richmond, Virginia, U.S. James; April 18, 1985 (aged 28); Virginia State Penitentiary, Richmond, Virginia, U.S.
- Cause of death: Linwood and James; Execution by electrocution
- Status: Linwood and James; Executed; Anthony; Incarcerated at Lawrenceville Correctional Center, Lawrenceville, Virginia, U.S.
- Convictions: Linwood; Capital murder First degree murder (6 counts); Involuntary manslaughter Rape; Robbery; Use of a firearm in the commission of a felony James; Capital murder (2 counts); First degree murder Attempted murder Rape robbery Use of a firearm in the commission of a felony Anthony; First degree murder (4 counts); Robbery; Use of a firearm in the commission of a felony
- Penalty: Linwood and James; Death; Anthony; Life imprisonment

Details
- Date: March 12 – October 19, 1979
- Location: Richmond, Virginia
- Killed: 13–21 (including a murder committed in 1971 and a pregnant woman)
- Weapons: Rifle; Fire; Cinderblock; Baseball bat Knives; Scissors; Fork; Pistol

Linwood Earl Briley, James Dyral "J. B." Briley Jr., and Anthony Ray Briley were a sibling trio of serial/spree killers, rapists, and robbers who were responsible for a murder, rape, and robbery spree that took place in Richmond, Virginia, in 1979.

Linwood murdered a woman in 1971 and served a year in a reformatory. In 1979, the three siblings (with help from an accomplice, Duncan Eric Meekins) went on a killing spree in their home city of Richmond, killing at least twelve people. Two would-be victims escaped unharmed. Linwood and J. B. were sentenced to death. In 1984, the two elder brothers escaped death row with four other inmates but were recaptured within three weeks. Linwood and J. B. were executed by electric chair in 1984 and 1985, respectively. Anthony Briley and Duncan Meekins are both still incarcerated.

== Early lives ==
The three Briley brothers, Linwood Earl (March 26, 1954 – October 12, 1984), James Dyral Jr. (June 6, 1956 – April 18, 1985) and Anthony Ray (born February 17, 1958), were brought up by their parents, James Dyral Briley Sr. and Bertha, in Richmond's Highland Park neighborhood. Their oldest brother, Edward Jerome "Boot" (July 7, 1952 – November 19, 2020) left the home to live with relatives in North Carolina in his early teen years and was not involved with his younger brothers' later criminal activities. With their younger brother Anthony, Linwood and J.B. were regarded by older neighbors as young people who would help them repair cars or mow lawns. The brothers collected exotic pets, such as tarantulas, piranhas, and boa constrictors. When the brothers reached their teenage years, Bertha and James Sr. split up and she moved away. James Dyral Briley Sr., reportedly the only person whom the brothers respected, kept his bedroom door padlocked from the inside overnight.

== First murder ==
On January 28, 1971, 16-year-old Linwood committed the first killing. While alone at home, Linwood fatally shot Orline Christian, a 57-year old neighbor, with a rifle from his bedroom window as she was hanging laundry on a clothesline. The crime almost went unidentified, but her relatives noticed a small bloody mark under her armpit at the viewing and asked a funeral director to re-examine the body. Upon a second examination, a small caliber bullet wound was discovered under her armpit.

Standing in Christian's back yard, a detective used a sheet of plywood to represent her body, with a hole cut out to represent the wound. He determined that the bullet came from the Briley residence. There, the murder weapon was found and Linwood admitted to the crime by saying, "I heard she had heart problems; she would have died soon anyway." After his lawyer convinced the judge that the shooting had been an accident, Linwood was found guilty of involuntary manslaughter and sent to reform school to serve a one-year sentence for the killing. J.B. followed in his path, and at a similar age was sentenced to time in juvenile hall for firing upon a police officer during a pursuit.

== Murder spree ==
In 1979, the three Briley brothers and an accomplice, Duncan Eric Meekins, began the seven-month series of random killings that terrified the city and surrounding region.

Their first attack occurred on March 12, 1979, when Linwood knocked on the door of Henrico County couple William and Virginia Bucher. Claiming that he had car trouble and needed to use their telephone, Linwood eventually forced his way into their home. He held the couple at gunpoint and waved Anthony inside. The two Brileys tied up the couple and robbed the house, dousing each room with kerosene after stripping it of valuables. As they left, a lit match was tossed on the fuel. The two hurriedly packed their stolen loot – a television, CB radio, a .32 pistol, and jewelry – into their trunk and drove out of the area. William Bucher managed to free himself and his wife from their restraints, which Meekins had not tied tightly enough, and the two escaped just before the house became engulfed in flames. They would be the sole survivors of the rampage, although their cat perished in the blaze.

On March 21, Michael W. McDuffie, a vending machine serviceman, was kidnapped, assaulted, shot, and robbed in his car by the Brileys. Ten days later, on March 31, Linwood shot and killed 28-year old Edric Alvin Clark over a drug dispute involving Meekins.

On April 9, the brothers followed 76-year-old Mary Gowen across town from her babysitting job. They followed her into her house, beat, raped, robbed, and shot her. They escaped from the residence with many of her valuables.

The gang saw seventeen-year-old Christopher Philips hanging around Linwood's parked car on July 4. Suspecting that he might have been trying to break into his car, the gang surrounded him and dragged him into a nearby backyard. There, the three brothers wrestled him to the ground. When Philips screamed for help, Linwood killed him by dropping a cinderblock onto his skull.

On September 14, disc jockey John Harvey "Johnny G." Gallaher was performing with his band at a South Richmond nightclub. Stepping outside between sets for a break, he inadvertently encountered the Brileys. Having been looking around town for a victim all night without success, they decided to lie in wait for whoever might happen to step outside. Linwood assaulted Gallaher and forced Gallagher into the trunk of his own Lincoln Continental. Gallagher was then driven out to the ruins of a paper mill on Mayo Island, located in the middle of the James River, where he was removed from the trunk of his car and shot dead at point blank range in the head. The Brileys stole six dollars from his wallet and divided it amongst themselves. Gallaher's body was then dumped into the river. The remains were found two days later. When arrested months later, Linwood was still wearing a ring stolen from Gallaher's hand.

On September 30, the Brileys followed 62-year-old private nurse Mary Wilfong to her Richmond apartment. The brothers surrounded her just outside the door, and Linwood beat her to death with a baseball bat. The brothers then entered her apartment and robbed it of valuables. Neighbors heard Wilfong's screams, and she was found sprawled on the complex's steps, still holding the key to her home.

Five days later, on October 5, just two blocks from the Briley home on 4th Avenue, 75-year-old Blanche Page and her 59-year-old boarder Charles Garner were murdered by the brothers. Page was bludgeoned to death while Garner was fatally assaulted and stabbed to death with various weapons, which included a baseball bat, five knives, a pair of scissors, and a fork. The scissors and fork were left embedded in Garner's back, which had been set on fire.

On October 14, as a favor for a friend, Linwood, James, and Meekins visited Thomas Saunders, 32. After the men got into a fight, one of the Briley brothers threw a gun to Meeks, who shot and killed Saunders.

The victims of the final murders were the family of Harvey Wilkerson, a longtime friend of the brothers. On the morning of October 19, despite having promised a judge earlier that day that he would stay out of trouble while out on parole, J.B. led his brothers on another prowl that night for yet another victim. Upon seeing the brothers down the street, Wilkerson, who lived with his 23-year-old common-law wife Judy Diane Barton (who was eight months pregnant at the time) and her 5-year-old son Harvey Wayne Barton, instinctively closed and locked his door. The brothers noticed this action and then approached Wilkerson's front door. Fearing what they would do if he refused to comply, Wilkerson reluctantly allowed them inside.

Both adults in the home were overpowered, bound, and gagged with duct tape. Linwood then raped Judy Barton in the kitchen, within hearing distance of the others. Meekins continued the rape, after which Linwood dragged Barton back into the living room, briefly searched the premises for valuables, and then left the house. The three remaining gang members covered their victims with sheets. J.B. told Meekins, "you've got to get one," upon which Meekins took a pistol and fatally shot Wilkerson in the head. J.B. then shot and killed both Barton and Harvey.

Police happened to be in the general vicinity of the neighborhood, and later saw the gang members running down the street at high speed. They did not know where the shots had been fired. The bodies were not discovered until three days later, but the brothers were all arrested soon afterwards.

== Capture and incarceration ==
During interrogation by police, Meekins was offered a plea agreement in return for turning state's evidence against the Brileys. He took the offer and provided a full detailing of the crime spree; as a result, he escaped the death penalty and was incarcerated under an alias at an out-of-state prison away from the Briley brothers. Under the agreement, Meekins was given a life sentence plus 80 years, which at the time of conviction would make him eligible for parole after serving 12–15 years.

A single life sentence with parole eligibility was handed down to Anthony Briley, youngest brother of the trio, due to his limited involvement in the killings. Due to Virginia's "triggerman statute", both J.B. and Linwood received numerous life sentences for murders committed during the spree, but faced capital charges only in cases where they had physically participated in the actual killing of the victim. Linwood was sentenced to death for the abduction and murder of Gallaher, while J.B. received two death sentences, one for each of the murders of Judy Barton and her son Harvey. Both were sent to death row at Mecklenburg Correctional Center near Boydton in early 1980.

== Escape ==
Linwood and James Briley were the ringleaders in a six-inmate escape from Virginia's death row at Mecklenburg Correctional Center on May 31, 1984. During the early moments of the escape, in which a coordinated effort resulted in inmates taking over the death row unit, both Brileys expressed strong interest in killing the captured guards by dousing them with rubbing alcohol and tossing a lit match. Willie Lloyd Turner, another death row inmate (executed by lethal injection on May 25, 1995), stepped in J. B.'s way and blocked him from doing so. Meanwhile, Wilbert Lee Evans, on death row after being convicted of the murder of Alexandria City sheriff's deputy William Truesdale, prevented Linwood from raping a female nurse. Evans was executed by electrocution on October 17, 1990, despite pleas for clemency and confirmation from the Mecklenburg guards who said they owed their lives to Evans. Alexandria Commonwealth's Attorney John Kloch, who prosecuted Evans, opposed Evans's clemency; Governor L. Douglas Wilder ultimately denied clemency.

The group's initial plan was to escape into Canada. Two death row inmates, Lem Davis Tuggle Jr. (convicted of raping and murdering one woman shortly after being released for another such crime; executed by lethal injection on December 12, 1996) and Willie Leroy Jones (convicted of two capital murders; executed on September 11, 1992), almost succeeded, making it as far as Vermont before being captured at gunpoint by police. The group was held at Marble Valley Correctional Facility in Rutland, Vermont, pending their extradition back to Virginia. Splitting off from their two remaining co-escapees at Philadelphia, the Brileys went to live near their uncle, Johnny Lee Council, in the north of the city. They were captured on June 19 by a heavily armed group of FBI agents and police, who had determined their location by placing wiretaps on their uncle's phone line.

== Executions ==
In short order, the remaining appeals ran out for both brothers. On March 28, 1985, three weeks before his execution on April 18, 1985, James Briley married a writer in a prison ceremony attended by his father, James Sr. The brothers were executed in the electric chair at the Virginia State Penitentiary in Richmond; Linwood's execution took place on October 12, 1984, and J.B.'s execution took place on April 18, 1985. Linwood's last meal consisted of grilled tenderloin steak, a baked potato, green peas, a salad with French dressing, rolls with butter, cake, peaches, punch, and milk. Linwood's last words were "I am innocent."

Deborah Wyatt, Linwood's defense attorney, told the press that her client, who was the first person to be executed involuntarily in Virginia since 1962, made the process easier by being "exceedingly brave". Decades later, however, former Richmond Police Department Head of Homicide Stuart Cook recounted to the British television show Born to Kill? that Linwood had been terrified of being executed.

"Linwood Briley, as brutal as he was, was a coward, and they had to sedate him and actually pick him up by his belt and walk him to the electric chair."

J.B.'s last meal consisted of fried shrimp with cocktail sauce and a lemon-lime-flavored soft drink. In his final moments, he smiled at the witnesses and twice asked them "Are you happy?"

Before J.B. was executed, Shirley Barton Hayes, the mother of Judy Barton, pleaded for him to admit his guilt. She said she did not believe in capital punishment, but asked him to confess "so his soul would be right with God."

The day J.B. was executed, fellow inmates tried to delay the process by attacking guards with homemade knives. Nine guards and one inmate were injured.

Linwood was survived by one son, Norman Laquan Ampy, who later served time in prison for bank robbery and died in 2015; he is survived by a daughter. J.B. is survived by three daughters, who live in Richmond. The brothers are buried at the Council family's cemetery plot in Bethel, North Carolina.

Anthony Ray Briley was convicted of four counts of first degree murder, three of those for the Barton family murders. He received a life sentence plus 119 years, with the possibility of parole. Anthony avoided capital murder charges since it could not be proven that he had personally committed any of the murders. To date, all his applications for parole have been denied by the state parole board, as have those of Duncan Meekins, despite recommendations from former prosecutors Robert J. Rice and Warren Von Schuch, who have cited Meekins' assistance in prosecuting and convicting the Briley brothers.

== Victims ==
- January 28, 1971: Orline Christian, 57 (was shot and killed by Linwood alone)
- 1979
  - March 21: Michael Wayne McDuffie, 20
  - March 31: Edric Alvin Clark, 28 (shot by Linwood over a drug dispute)
  - April 9: Mary Gowen, 76
  - July 4: Christopher Phillips, 17
  - September 14: John Harvey "Johnny G." Gallaher, 62
  - September 30: Mary Wilfong, 62
  - October 5: The double killing
    - Blanche Page, 75
    - Charles Garner, 59
  - October 14: Thomas Saunders, 32
  - October 19: The Wilkerson family
    - Harvey Wilkerson, 27
    - Judy Diane Barton, 23 (was 8 months pregnant)
    - Harvey Wayne Barton, 5

== See also ==
- Capital punishment in Virginia
- List of people executed in Virginia
- List of people executed in the United States in 1984
- List of people executed in the United States in 1985
- List of fugitives from justice who disappeared
- List of serial killers in the United States
- List of prison escapes
