= Sussex II State Prison =

Former prison in Virginia, United States

Coordinates: 37°03′04″N 77°12′19″W

- Interactive map of Sussex II State Prison
- Location: 24427 Mussellwhite Drive Waverly, Virginia
- Status: Closed
- Security class: close
- Capacity: 1352
- Opened: 1999
- Closed: July 1, 2024
- Managed by: Virginia Department of Corrections

Sussex II State Prison was a prison of the Virginia Department of Corrections located in unincorporated Sussex County, Virginia, near Waverly. It was adjacent to Sussex I State Prison, which lies to its southeast, just across Mussellwhite Drive.

One of only four state prisons, the facility had a maximum capacity of 1,352 offenders. It was a security level 4 prison. The prison offers vocational and educational programs, as well as re-entry to offenders who qualify. In terms of building structure, the facility was identical to Sussex I State Prison.

In May 2004, two inmates attempted to escape the prison in a truck but were apprehended.

== Financial controversy ==
When Sussex I and Sussex II State Prisons were opened in 1998, they were built on state owned land which could not be subject to property taxes from Sussex County. An agreement was reached with the county Board of Supervisors for the state to instead make an annual "Payment in Lieu of Taxes", a service fee based on the land's value. That amount was assessed at $500,000 and it was utilized by the county for supporting their fire and emergency services, both of which service the prison. In 2010, during the Great Recession, this payment was cut from the state budget by then Governor Tim Kaine. It was never subsequently restored when the economy improved. This came to light in 2023, when local officials in Sussex County went to the media to discuss the financial burdens that both of the Sussex state prisons put upon their services.

== Planned closure ==
In December 2023, the Virginia Department of Corrections announced plans to permanently close the Sussex II State Prison along with three other state correctional facilities elsewhere in the commonwealth effective July 1, 2024. According to a press release from VADOC the closure decisions were made "to enhance employee, inmate, and probationer safety, to address longstanding staffing challenges, and in consideration of significant ongoing maintenance costs." As of January 2024, there were no inmates being housed at the prison in advance of its pending closure.
