= Andrew J. Boyle =

U.S. Army lieutenant general

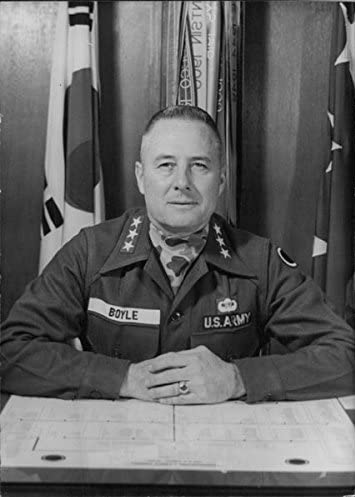
- Boyle as commander of I Corps, circa 1965
- Born: December 11, 1911; Braddock, Pennsylvania, U.S.
- Died: March 15, 2001 (aged 89); Culpeper, Virginia, U.S.
- Burial place: Little Fork Burying Ground, Rixeyville, Virginia, U.S.
- Education: United States Military Academy; Staff College, Camberley; Armed Forces Staff College; United States Army War College
- Spouse: Elaine White (m. 1936–2001)
- Children: 1
- Military career
- Service: United States Army
- Service years: 1935–1970
- Rank: Lieutenant General
- Nickname: Jack
- Service number: 019924
- Units: U.S. Cavalry Branch; U.S. Army Armor Branch
- Commands: Headquarters and Service Troop, 3rd Cavalry Regiment; 3rd Battalion, 3rd Armored Cavalry Regiment; Combat Command B, 2nd Armored Division; Programs Evaluation Office, Laos; Military Assistance Advisory Group–Laos; 25th Infantry Division; U.S. Army Armor Center; I Corps; V Corps
- Conflicts: World War II; Korean DMZ Conflict
- Awards: Army Distinguished Service Medal; Legion of Merit; Croix de Guerre (Belgium); Order of Leopold (Belgium); War Cross (Norway); Order of Service Merit (Second Class) (South Korea)
- Other work: Cattle rancher Chairman, Culpeper Planning Commission

Andrew J. Boyle (December 11, 1911 – March 15, 2001) was a career officer in the United States Army. A veteran of World War II and the 1966 Korean DMZ Conflict, Boyle attained the rank of lieutenant general. His commands included Military Assistance Advisory Group–Laos, the 25th Infantry Division, the U.S. Army Armor Center, I Corps, and V Corps. Boyle's U.S. awards included the Army Distinguished Service Medal and Legion of Merit. His foreign decorations included the Belgian Croix de Guerre and Order of Leopold, the War Cross of Norway, and South Korea's Order of Service Merit (Second Class).

A native of Braddock, Pennsylvania, Boyle was raised and educated in Baltimore, and served in the National Guard while still in high school. In 1935, he graduated from the United States Military Academy at West Point and began a career in the Cavalry. Initially assigned to the 7th Cavalry Regiment, during World War II he graduated from the British Staff College, Camberley, then served on the staff of Supreme Headquarters Allied Expeditionary Force (SHAEF), where he was responsible for T-Force activities throughout Europe. After the war, Boyle was an instructor at the United States Army Armor School and completed the Armor Officer Advanced Course, and he graduated from the Armed Forces Staff College in 1949. He served with the 3rd Armored Cavalry Regiment at Fort Meade, Maryland, and on the faculty at the Command and General Staff College, followed by attendance at the United States Army Airborne School.

In 1954, Boyle graduated from the United States Army War College, then was assigned to West Germany as commander of the 2nd Armored Division's Combat Command B, followed by assignment as the division chief of staff. His later assignments included commander of Military Assistance Advisory Group–Laos, the 25th Infantry Division, and the U.S. Army Armor Center. As a lieutenant general, Boyle commanded U.S. I Corps during the Korean DMZ Conflict, followed by command of U.S. V Corps. His last posting before his 1970 retirement was U.S. permanent military deputy to the Central Treaty Organization (CENTO).

In retirement, Boyle operated a beef cattle farm in Mitchells, Virginia and was involved in several Culpeper County charitable and civic causes. He died in Culpeper on March 1, 2001. Boyle was buried at Little Fork Burying Ground in Rixeyville, Virginia.

== Early life ==
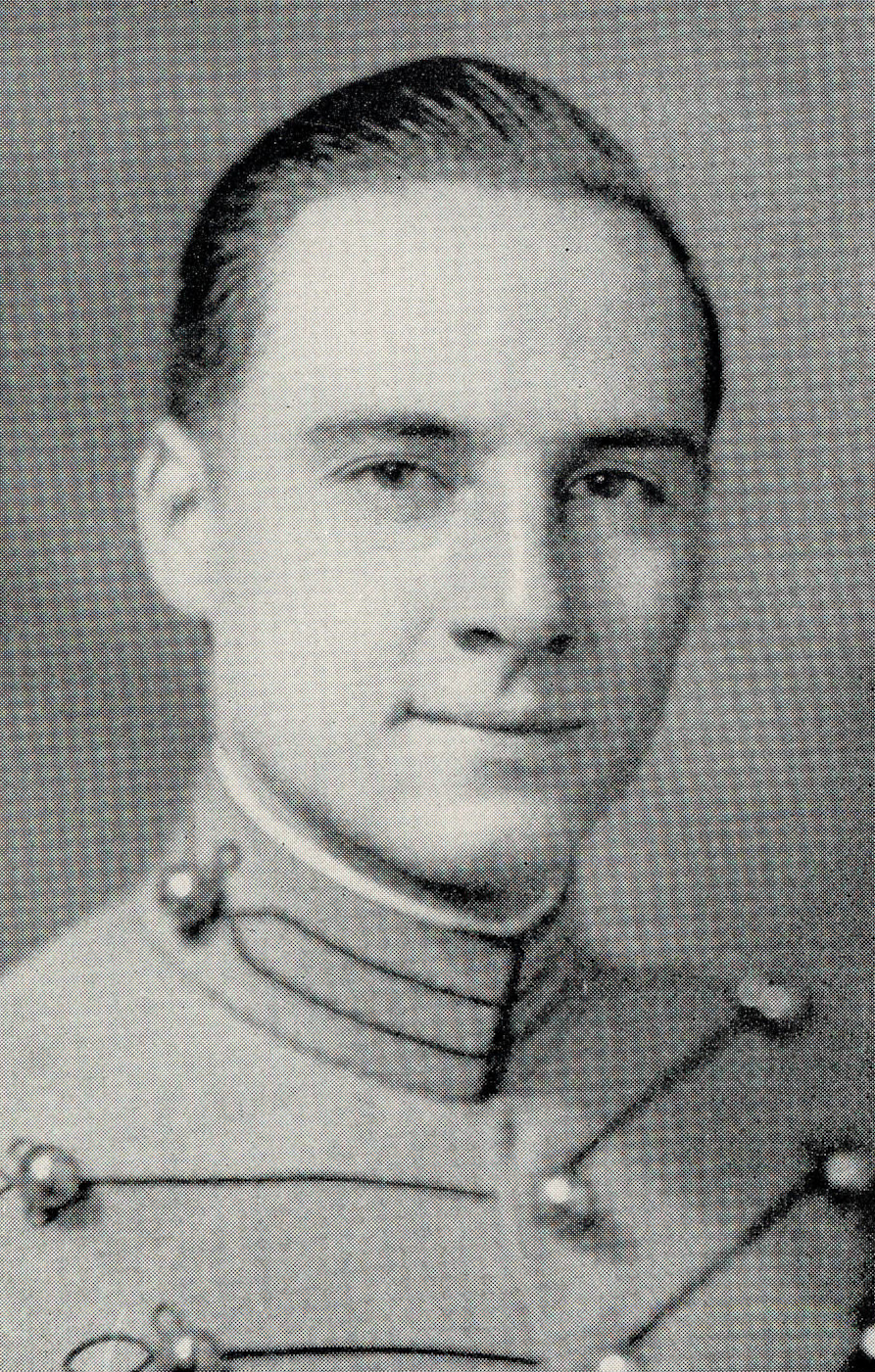
Boyle as a West Point cadet in 1935

Andrew Jackson Boyle was born in Braddock, Pennsylvania on December 11, 1911, a son of Elmer Newton Boyle and Monica (Shaffer) Boyle. He was raised and educated in Baltimore, and graduated from Forest Park High School in 1931, where he was a member of the track and field and football teams.

In the late 1920s and early 1930s, Boyle served as a private in the Maryland National Guard's 113th Ambulance Company, a unit of the 104th Medical Regiment. In 1930, he competed for an appointment to the United States Military Academy (USMA) at West Point available to members of the National Guard. He was the top finisher from Maryland on the examination, and went on to secure a place in the class of 1935. He completed a six-week preparatory course in the summer of 1931 and began studies at West Point that fall.

Boyle graduated from USMA in 1935 ranked 216th of 277 and received his commission as a second lieutenant of Cavalry. He was assigned to the 7th Cavalry Regiment and posted to Fort Bliss, Texas. In September 1936, Boyle married Elaine White in El Paso, Texas. They were married until his death and were the parents of a son, Andrew J. Boyle Jr.

== Start of career ==
Boyle commanded a platoon, then a troop in the 7th Cavalry until June 1939, and he was promoted to first lieutenant in June 1938. He was a student in the Fort Riley, Kansas Cavalry Officers' Course from September 1939 to September 1940 and he was promoted to temporary captain on September 9, 1940. After graduation, he was assigned to the 3rd Cavalry Regiment at Fort Myer, Virginia, where he commanded Headquarters and Service Troop, then a squadron, and assisted in moving the regiment to Fort Oglethorpe, Georgia.

Following U.S. entry into World War II, in June 1942 he was assigned to Fort Rucker, Alabama, where he assisted in organizing the first air base security training group, which instructed specialized battalions in tactics against parachute troops. From late 1943 to January 1944, Boyle attended the United States Army Command and General Staff College at Fort Leavenworth, Kansas. He then served on the staff of a Canadian armored unit in southern France until March, when he became a student at Staff College, Camberley. After graduating, he joined the staff of Supreme Headquarters Allied Expeditionary Force (SHAEF), where he was responsible for T-Force activities in the European theatre. After the war, Boyle remained in Europe as deputy chief of Field Information Agency, Technical.

== Continued career ==
After returning to the United States in 1947, Boyle spent three years as an instructor at the United States Army Armor School and completed the Armor Officer Advanced Course, which was followed by attendance at the Armed Forces Staff College, from which he graduated in 1949. He then joined the 3rd Armored Cavalry Regiment at Fort Meade, Maryland, first as commander of 3rd Battalion, then as the regimental executive officer. He then served for three years on the faculty at the Command and General Staff College, followed by attendance at the United States Army Airborne School.

After becoming qualified as a paratrooper, Boyle was attended the United States Army War College, from which he graduated in 1954. He was then assigned to West Germany as commander of the 2nd Armored Division's Combat Command B in Mainz, followed by assignment as the division's chief of staff in Bad Kreuznach. He was subsequently posted to Frankfurt as operations officer (G-3), on the staff of U.S. V Corps.

Boyle returned to the United States in 1957 and was assigned as deputy chief of staff for the Continental Army Command. In 1959, he was appointed president of the U.S. Army Armor Board at Fort Knox, which tested tanks and other armored vehicles and made recommendations for fielding and procurement. In 1960, Boyle was promoted to brigadier general and posted to the Kingdom of Laos as commander of the Programs Evaluation Office, a military advisory mission to the Royal Lao Armed Forces that he carried out clandestinely in order to comply with the Geneva Accords of 1954. In April 1961, he was appointed to command Military Assistance Advisory Group–Laos.

== Later career ==
After his service in Laos, Boyle was assigned to Fort Shafter, Hawaii as operations officer (G-3) of United States Army Pacific and promoted to major general. In 1963, he was assigned as commander of the 25th Infantry Division at Schofield Barracks. In 1964, Boyle returned to Fort Knox, this time as commander of the U.S. Army Armor Center.

In 1965, Boyle was promoted to lieutenant general and assigned to command of U.S. I Corps in South Korea. During this posting, Boyle took part in the Korean DMZ Conflict. In 1967, he was assigned as commander of U.S. V Corps in West Germany. His final assignment was U.S. permanent military deputy to the Central Treaty Organization (CENTO).

== Retirement and death ==
After Boyle's retirement, he resided on a farm, Allaway, in Mitchells, Virginia, where he raised beef cattle. He served as the first chairman of the Culpeper Planning Commission. He also served as president of the Mitchells' Ruritan Club and on the board of directors for the Culpeper Regional Hospital and the Piedmont Environmental Council. In addition, he led the effort to restore the Little Fork Church in Rixeyville and establish its cemetery, and later served as chairman of the church's building and grounds committee.

Boyle later sold his farm and moved to a home in Culpeper. He died in Culpeper on March 15, 2001. He was buried at Little Fork Burying Ground in Rixeyville.

== Awards ==
Boyle's U.S. awards included the Army Distinguished Service Medal and the Legion of Merit with two oak leaf clusters. His foreign awards included the Croix de Guerre from Belgium, the Order of Leopold from Belgium, the War Cross from Norway, and South Korea's Order of Service Merit (Second Class).
