= Sable Communications of California v. FCC =

Sable Communications of California v. Federal Communications Commission
- Supreme Court of the United States

Argued April 19, 1989 Decided June 23, 1989
- Full case name: Sable Communications of California, Inc. v. Federal Communications Commission, et al.
- Citations: 492 U.S. 115 (more) 109 S. Ct. 2829; 106 L. Ed. 2d 93; 1989 U.S. LEXIS 3135; 57 U.S.L.W. 4920; 66 Rad. Reg. 2d (P & F) 969; 16 Media L. Rep. 1961

Case history
- Prior: Appeal from the United States District Court for the Central District of California

Holding
- Since the First Amendment does not protect obscene speech, the ban was legitimate. However, sexual expression that is simply indecent is protected. Therefore, banning adult access to indecent messages "far exceeds that which is necessary" to shield minors from dial-a-porn services.

Court membership
- Chief Justice William Rehnquist Associate Justices William J. Brennan Jr. · Byron White; Thurgood Marshall · Harry Blackmun; John P. Stevens · Sandra Day O'Connor; Antonin Scalia · Anthony Kennedy

Case opinions
- Majority: White, joined by unanimous (parts I, II, IV); Rehnquist, Blackmun, O'Connor, Scalia, Kennedy (part III)
- Concurrence: Scalia
- Concur/dissent: Brennan, joined by Marshall, Stevens

Sable Communications of California v. Federal Communications Commission, 492 U.S. 115 (1989), was a United States Supreme Court case involving the definition of "indecent material" and whether it is protected under the First Amendment to the United States Constitution. The Court invalidated part of a federal law that prohibited "dial-a-porn" telephone messaging services by making it a crime to transmit commercial telephone messages that were either "obscene" or "indecent".

== Obscenity versus indecency ==
The often tough question of what it is that makes material indecent or obscene was an important aspect of this case. The murky line between these two categories has been difficult to determine. In Butler v. Michigan (1957), when dealing with the sale of books containing adult material, the Court "reversed a conviction under a statute which made it an offense to make available to the general public materials found to have a potentially harmful influence on minors". This case, however, did not deal with definitions. A case that did, which is one of the most crucial cases to this debate, was Miller v. California (1973), which involved the mailing of sexually explicit advertising brochures.

From this case, the Miller test was established as a way to determine whether a work can be considered obscene. The test has three major criteria:

- Whether the average person, applying contemporary community standards, would deem the work as appealing to the prurient interest,
- Whether the work depicted sexual conduct, as defined by state law, in a patently offensive way,
- Whether the work as a whole lacked serious literary, artistic, political, or scientific value.

All three parts must be fulfilled for the material to be considered obscenity.

== History of Dial-a-Porn ==
The first attempt to deal with dial-a-porn services occurred with subsection 223(b) in the 1934 Communications Act. With 223(b), it became illegal to make obscene or indecent phone calls to anyone who was either under 18 years old, or had not given consent. To regulate this, the FCC required dial-a-porn services to operate only between 9 p.m. and 8 a.m., and receive payment with a credit card. In 1984, the case of Carlin Communications, Inc. v. FCC, 749 F.2d 113 (2nd Cir. 1984) (Carlin I) deemed the time channeling to not be effective because it did not allow adults access to dial-a-porn services between 8 a.m. and 9 p.m., but still could allow access to minors who could not be stopped from calling between the current legal hours.

After getting rid of these time restrictions in 1985, the FCC began to use a system of user identification access codes, in addition to credit cards, to regulate these dial-a-porn services. They later added message scrambling, which made use of a descrambling device that was only available to adults to actually listen to dial-a-porn phone calls. The combination of these three regulatory practices were finally supported as being effective enough to protect minors after Carlin Communications, Inc. v. FCC, 837 F.2d 546 (2nd Cir.) (Carlin III).

== Case ==
In 1988, Congress amended subsection 223(b) of the Communications Act of 1934 to ban indecent and obscene interstate commercial phone messages, regardless of age. This made the business of Sable Communications, who had been in the dial-a-porn industry since 1983, illegal. The federal parties had argued that the only way to prevent children's access to dial-a-porn messages was through the complete ban of their telephone services. Sable Communications argued that the "legislation creates an impermissible national standard of obscenity, and that it places message senders in a 'double bind' by compelling them to tailor all their messages to the least tolerant community".

The Court said that if the government wants to protect children in this regard, it must do so by technological means, rather than by a total ban on the transmission of these messages. Although some children might be able to defeat these devices, a banning these services would have the impermissible effect of "limiting the content of adult telephone conversations to that which is suitable for children to hear".

== Ruling ==
A judge of the United States District Court for the Central District of California upheld the ban on obscene messages, but ordered the Act's enforcement against indecent ones. The Court upheld the district court ruling. Since the First Amendment does not protect obscene speech, as the Court found in Paris Adult Theatre I v. Slaton (1973), the ban on obscene speech was legitimate. However, sexual expression that is simply indecent is protected. Therefore, banning adult access to indecent messages "far exceeds that which is necessary" to shield minors from dial-a-porn services.

Words from the Court
Sexual expression which is indecent but not obscene is protected by the First Amendment...The Government may, however, regulate the content of constitutionally protected speech in order to promote a compelling interest if it chooses the least restrictive means to further the articulated interest. We have recognized that there is a compelling interest in protecting the physical and psychological well-being of minors. This interest extends to shielding minors from the influence of literature that is not obscene by adult standards.

The Government may serve this legitimate interest, but to withstand constitutional scrutiny it must do so by narrowly drawn regulations designed to serve those interests without unnecessarily interfering with First Amendment freedoms...It is not enough to show that the Government's ends are compelling; the means must be carefully tailored to achieve those ends.

== Significance ==
The court drew a sharp distinction between speech that meets the legal definition of "obscene" and speech that is "indecent" (sexually charged but not rising to the level of "obscene"). The court held that obscene speech could be restricted, but that merely indecent speech was protected by the First Amendment. The court also recognized a real need for governmental interest in shielding children from speech that could be obscene to minors, but not for adults. However, the court stressed that these limitations must be limited so they can distinguish what is and what is not restricted, carefully protecting the rights of adults to receive protected speech, even if that protected speech is indecent.
