= List of United States Supreme Court cases, volume 492 =

This is a list of all the United States Supreme Court cases from volume 492 of the United States Reports:

Case name	Citation	Date decided
Murray v. Giarratano	492 U.S. 1	1989
Granfinanciera, S.A. v. Nordberg	492 U.S. 33	1989
Hoffman v. Dept. of Income Maintenance	492 U.S. 96	1989
Sable Communications of California v. FCC	492 U.S. 115	1989
Dept. of Justice v. Tax Analysts	492 U.S. 136	1989
Pub. Employees Retirement System v. Betts	492 U.S. 158	1989
Duckworth v. Eagan	492 U.S. 195	1989
H.J. Inc. v. Sw. Bell Tel. Co.	492 U.S. 229	1989
Browning-Ferris Industries v. Kelco Disposal, Inc.	492 U.S. 257	1989
Penry v. Lynaugh	492 U.S. 302	1989
Stanford v. Kentucky	492 U.S. 361	1989
Wyoming v. United States	492 U.S. 406	1989
Brendale v. Yakima Nation	492 U.S. 408	1989
State Univ. of N.Y. v. Fox	492 U.S. 469	1989
Webster v. Reproductive Health Services	492 U.S. 490	1989
Allegheny Cnty. v. ACLU	492 U.S. 573	1989
Powell v. Texas	492 U.S. 680	1989
California v. Am. Stores Co.	492 U.S. 1301	1989
