= Haynesville Correctional Center =

Prison in Virginia, United States

Coordinates: 37°57′20″N 76°40′09″W

- Interactive map of Haynesville Correctional Center
- Location: 421 Barnfield Road Haynesville, Virginia
- Status: mixed
- Security class: level 2 (medium)
- Capacity: 1141
- Opened: 1993
- Managed by: Virginia Department of Corrections

The Haynesville Correctional Center is a medium security state prison for men located in Haynesville, Richmond County, Virginia, owned and operated by the Virginia Department of Corrections.

The facility was opened in 1993 and has a daily working population of 1,141 inmates, held at a range of security levels.
