= Duckworth v. Eagan =

- Supreme Court of the United States

Argued March 29, 1989 Decided June 26, 1989
- Full case name: Jack R. Duckworth v. Gary James Eagan
- Citations: 492 U.S. 195 (more) 109 S. Ct. 2875; 106 L. Ed. 2d 166

Holding
- Improperly informing a suspect that an attorney would be appointed for him "if and when you go to court," and then having him later sign a waiver with the proper Miranda warning before he makes incriminating statements does not render Miranda warnings inadequate.

Court membership
- Chief Justice William Rehnquist Associate Justices William J. Brennan Jr. · Byron White; Thurgood Marshall · Harry Blackmun; John P. Stevens · Sandra Day O'Connor; Antonin Scalia · Anthony Kennedy

Case opinions
- Majority: Rehnquist, joined by White, O'Connor, Scalia, Kennedy
- Concurrence: O'Connor, joined by Scalia
- Dissent: Marshall, joined by Brennan; Blackmun, Stevens (Part I)

Laws applied
- U.S. Const. amend. V

Duckworth v. Eagan, 492 U.S. 195 (1989), was a United States Supreme Court case dealing with police behavior when issuing the Miranda warning. The Court's decision was seen as weakening Miranda's protections.

== Background ==
After being questioned in regards to the stabbing of a woman, Gary Eagan was improperly read his Miranda Rights when police told him that he would be provided a lawyer "if and when you go to court." During the police investigation, Eagan did not make any incriminating statements, and waived his Miranda rights. The next day, Eagan was questioned again by police, and signed a waiver with the correct Miranda language. During the interrogation, Eagan confessed to the stabbing of the woman and revealed physical evidence of the crime committed. Later, Eagan claimed that the difference between the language in the first waiver he signed, and the second waiver he signed, made his confession inadmissible in a court of law.

== Opinion of the Court ==
Chief Justice Rehnquist wrote the opinion for the Court. The Supreme Court held that it was not necessary that the warnings be given in the exact form described in the Miranda decision, provided the warnings as a whole fully informed the suspect of his or her rights.
