= Marie Deans =

American anti-death penalty activist

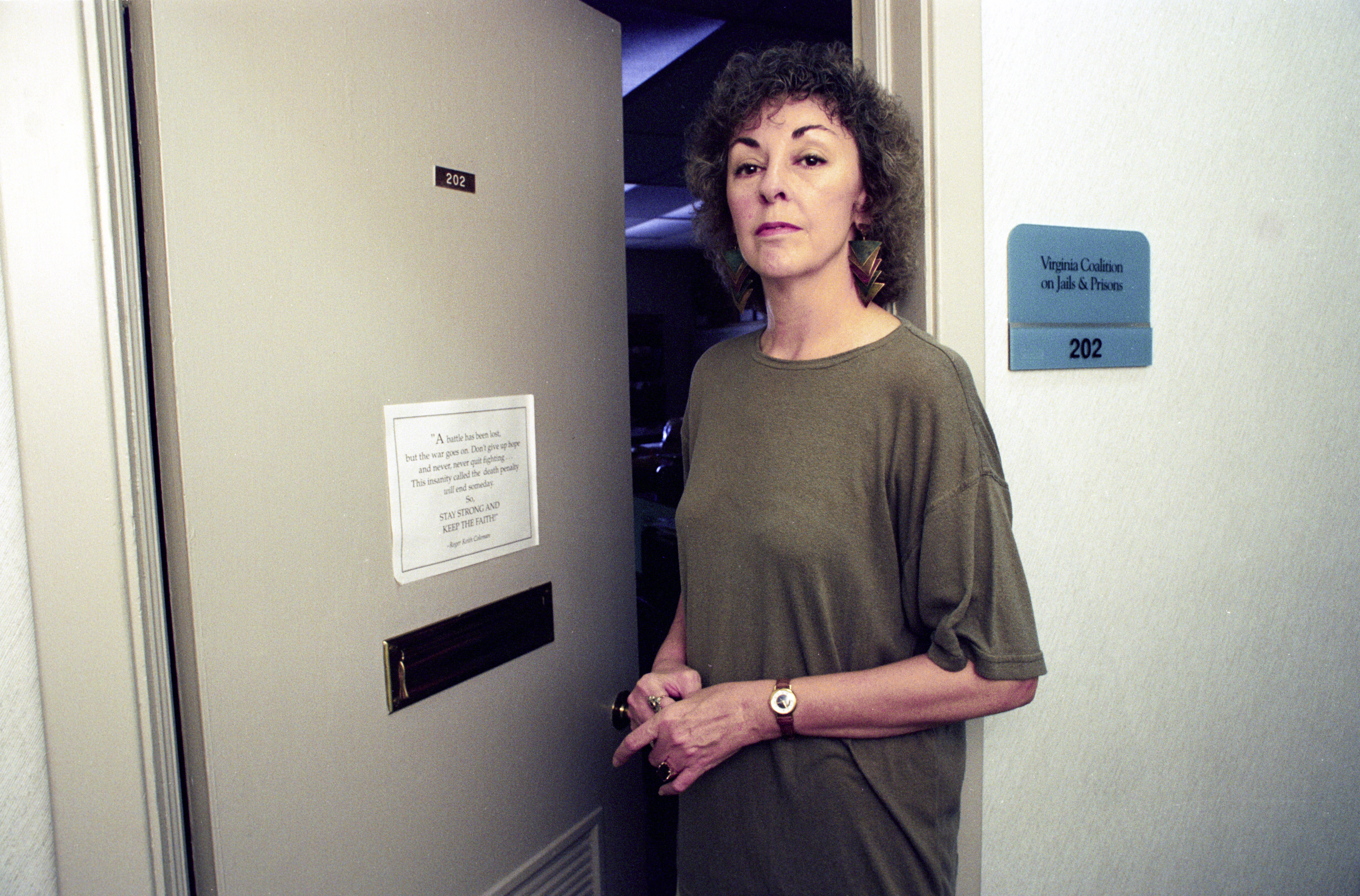
Marie Deans poses outside her office at the Virginia Coalition on Jails & Prisons

Susan Marie Deans (June 8, 1940 – April 15, 2011) was an American anti-death penalty activist who was committed to finding attorneys for men who were facing execution without legal representation. Marie's work began on death row began in South Carolina in the early 1980s and continued in Virginia for the next twenty years where she saved over 200 people from death sentences in Virginia and South Carolina. A memoir of Deans' life and work, titled A Courageous Fool: Marie Deans and Her Struggle Against the Death Penalty, was released in 2017.

== Early life and personal life ==
Susan Marie McFadden was born on June 8, 1940, in New Zion, South Carolina. Her parents were Joel Ellis McFadden II (1916-1985), a Charleston, South Carolina jewelry store owner, and Eva Alice "Hettie" McFadden (née Jackson; 1918–1983). Married three times, Marie was the mother of Joel McFadden and J. Robert Deans.

== Murder of Penny Deans ==
On August 20, 1972, four years after her marriage to Robert Lee Deans, his mother Evelyn Elizabeth "Penny" Deans (née Coin) was found murdered in her home in Charleston, South Carolina. Penny's murder was the beginning of Marie's anti-death penalty work. Deans recalled the moments just after she and her husband arrived to the crime scene, where "A young police officer, his uniform black in the night, came over and put his hand gently on my shoulder, telling me 'Don't worry, we'll catch the bastard and fry him." Deans was haunted by this officer's attempt to assuage her shock and sadness. She did not feel that "frying" the murderer would make her or anyone else feel better, or solve any other problems. "I had been like most people, not really thinking about the families of murderers," she wrote. But at this point, Deans began to put herself in the shoes of the killer's sister, and imagined the grief she would feel if her brother were killed by the state for committing a crime. She decided that the death penalty was wrong, and she was going to try to save people from the machinery of death.

== Anti-Death Penalty Work ==
Although Deans estimated that she saved over 250 inmates from their death sentences, she also lost 34 of the men she worked tirelessly to save. Deans "stood death watch" with each of these men, but could not emotionally withstand attending their executions.

Deans founded Victims' Families for Alternatives to the Death Penalty in 1976, later renamed Murder Victims' Families for Reconciliation. This organization was formed by people who, like Marie, opposed the death penalty and needed support after having a family member murdered. Marie felt that the families of murder victims need a "safe place from which they could speak out" because of tension she perceived among the families, abolitionists, and attorneys."

In 1979, Deans founded the Charleston chapter of Amnesty International.

In 1982, Deans made her first visit to Virginia's death row. One of the first inmates she met there was Joe Giarratano, who, in 1979 at age 21, had been convicted of allegedly murdering his girlfriend and raping her 15-year-old daughter. Despite receiving a notably speedy trial with legal inconsistencies, prosecutorial misconduct, coerced confessions, and "evidence" from a poor investigation, Giarratano was sentenced to death. Deans worked to convince the Virginia justice system, all the way up to then-Governor L. Douglas Wilder, that Giarratano may have been falsely accused. In 1991, with mere hours until Giarratano was scheduled to be executed, Wilder ordered that the sentence be halted. After retrials, Giarratano was given a life sentence with a chance for parole after 25 years of his 1979 conviction. In November 2021, Giarratano was granted parole.

In 1983, Deans moved to Virginia and founded the Virginia Coalition on Jails and Prisons.

In 1984, Deans met Earl Washington Jr. while visiting Virginia's death row. Washington had an IQ of 69 when he was arrested for allegedly murdering and raping Rebecca Williams of Culpeper, Virginia. It was not until 2000 that Washington Jr. would receive a full pardon by then-Virginia Governor James Gilmore after DNA evidence proved his innocence.

In 1994, the Virginia Coalition on Jails and Prisons closed after funding ceased. Marie never made more than $13,000 a year as the head of the Coalition, and in the final year of its existence she drew no salary at all. Following the closure, Marie founded the Virginia Mitigation Project, which continued her earlier work of convincing juries to reject capital verdicts. She also lectured, debated, and shared her expertise on mitigation.

== End of Life ==
On April 15, 2011, Deans died of lung cancer, after a long illness. Her memorial service was held on May 1, 2011, at St. Paul's Memorial Church in Charlottesville, Virginia. During the service, eulogies were delivered by the Reverend Joseph Ingle, actor and death penalty activist Mike Farrell, attorney Lloyd Snook, and sons Joel McFadden and Robert Deans. One of her pallbearers was former Virginia death row inmate Earl Washington Jr., who Deans helped factually exonerate. Deans was buried back in South Carolina in the Sardinia-Gable Cemetery in Clarendon County.
