= Earl Washington Jr. =

American former death-row inmate (born 1960)

Earl Washington Jr. (born May 3, 1960) is a former Virginia death row inmate, who was fully exonerated of murder charges against him in 2000. He had been convicted and sentenced to death in 1984 for the 1982 rape and murder of Rebecca Lyn Williams in Culpeper, Virginia. Washington has an IQ estimated at 69, which classifies him as intellectually disabled. He was coerced into confessing to the crime when arrested on an unrelated charge a year later.

Washington, who had not exhausted all of his appeals, was scheduled for execution in September 1985 but a pro bono defense effort and appeal gained a stay while working to appeal his conviction. Based on questions about his murder conviction raised in 1993 due to DNA testing, which had not been available at the time of trial, Washington's death sentence was commuted in 1994 by Virginia governor Douglas Wilder to life imprisonment. In 2000 additional DNA testing was done, as new technology was available. Based on this, Washington was pardoned by Governor James Gilmore and released from prison in 2001, after finishing a sentence for lesser crimes that he had actually committed. In 2006, he was awarded a settlement from the estate of Agent Curtis R. Wilmore, who had coerced Washington's confession. In 2007, he received a settlement from the state.

== Background ==
In 1982, 19-year-old Rebecca Lynn Williams, mother of three, was raped and murdered in Culpeper, Virginia. In 1983 in neighboring Fauquier County, Virginia, Earl Washington Jr., a black man with a major intellectual disability, was arrested for and admitted to breaking into the home of his elderly neighbor. Washington, who was drunk, had beaten 73-year-old Hazel Weeks with a chair, then stole a gun from her apartment which he used to shoot his brother, whom he'd recently had an argument with, in the foot. These were the only crimes for which Washington was indeed guilty. Washington openly wept when asked about this case, saying he was ashamed of it and that Weeks was a kind woman who had befriended him.

Washington pleaded guilty to malicious wounding and burglary for assaulting Weeks and was sentenced to 30 years in prison. One of his lawyers later said that the harshness of the sentence was based on his believed involvement in the murder of Rebecca Williams. They calculated that the average sentence at the time for the crimes for which Washington, who had no criminal record, was guilty would've been 15.1 years, with the average time served being roughly five years.

Subsequently, police coerced confessions from Washington for the rape/murder and three other sexual assaults. The other three charges were quickly disproven based on witness statements and physical evidence. The rape/murder case proceeded to trial based solely on the confession obtained after "days of police rehearsal and re-shaping" through leading questions and Washington agreeing to detectives' corrections when he got details of the crime, including the victim's race, and of the crime scene wrong.

With low-quality representation by defense counsel — his defense counsel had failed to discuss his intellectual disability as a mitigating factor during sentencing — Washington was convicted of capital murder and sentenced to death.

== Review and appeals ==
After fellow death row inmate Joseph Giarratano took on his case in 1985, shortly before Washington's scheduled execution in September of that year, he noted the inmate's mental disability. Giarratano contacted Marie Deans, a volunteer advocate with whom he had worked, who enlisted pro bono help to gain a stay of execution for Washington, who had yet to exhaust all of his appeals.

Washington's defense attorneys gained approval in 1993 to conduct an analysis of DNA evidence from the crime scene. This showed that Washington could not have made the semen stain and raised doubt that he was responsible for the crimes for which he was sentenced. The appeals court refused to hear the case because Virginia has severe limitations on when new evidence can be introduced post-conviction. In 1994, Governor Douglas Wilder commuted Washington's sentence to life in prison.

In 2000, after more accurate DNA testing connected another man to the crime, Washington was exonerated, receiving a full pardon from Governor James Gilmore. Washington was represented by attorneys Robert T. Hall, Eric M. Freedman, Gerald Zerkin and Barry A. Weinstein. He was paroled for his original malicious wounding and burglary convictions in February 2001. One of his lawyers expressed frustration that Washington did not receive credit for time served, which would've resulted in him being freed immediately.

In 2006, Washington was awarded $2.25 million from the estate of Agent Curtis R. Wilmore who had coerced the false confession from the defendant. In 2007, Washington, the state of Virginia, and Wilmore's estate agreed to a settlement whereby Washington was to receive $1.9 million for wrongful conviction from the state.

In 2007, Kenneth Tinsley, who was already serving a life sentence for rape, and had been identified in a review of the state DNA database as matching DNA from the crime scene, pleaded guilty to capital murder and rape to avoid the death penalty. As part of his plea agreement, Tinsley received two consecutive life sentences and agreed to waive his right to become eligible for parole.

== Aftermath ==
Since Washington's exoneration, the United States Supreme Court ruled in Atkins v. Virginia (2002) that the death penalty for persons with intellectual disability was unconstitutional. It ordered states to review the cases of persons on death row who had been convicted and shown to have such disability, and to commute their sentences to appropriate lower levels of punishment. Washington's case is frequently cited by opponents of the death penalty as an example of a wrongful conviction and death sentence. He is an innocent man who was narrowly saved from being executed. Jerry Givens, the executioner who had been scheduled to take Washington's life in 1985, cited this exoneration as a major factor in his conversion to anti-death penalty campaigner.

== See also ==
- List of wrongful convictions in the United States
- Legal ethics
- Exculpatory evidence
- Innocence Project
- List of miscarriage of justice cases
- Race in the United States criminal justice system
- Capital punishment in the United States
- Innocent prisoner's dilemma
- Miscarriage of justice
- False confession
- Overturned convictions in the United States
