= Deerfield Correctional Center =

Prison in Virginia, United States

- Interactive map of Deerfield Correctional Center
- Location: 21360 Deerfield Road Capron, Virginia; 36°43′46″N 77°14′45″W
- Status: Operational
- Security class: Level 2 (medium)
- Capacity: 1,080
- Population: 991 (June 2023)
- Opened: 1994
- Managed by: Virginia Department of Corrections
- Warden: Darrell Miller

Deerfield Correctional Center is a state prison for men located in Capron, Southampton County, Virginia, owned and operated by the Virginia Department of Corrections. The facility was opened in 1994 and has a working capacity of 1,080 prisoners.

It houses a special population of "geriatric and assisted living inmates": elderly, infirm, disabled, and other special-needs prisoners. The number of elderly prisoners has increased in Virginia's inmate population since the Commonwealth's abolition of parole in 1994. It is a level-two security prison (medium).

The site is adjacent to Virginia's former Southampton Correctional Center, which was established in 1938 as an agricultural facility. By 1955 Southampton had developed as a campus that included a livestock operation, a cannery, and a sewage disposal facility. Through prisoner labor, the facility supplied 80% of its own food. Southampton was closed in January 2009 and was demolished soon after.
