= Board of Trustees of State University of New York v. Fox =

- Supreme Court of the United States

Argued February 22, 1989 Decided June 29, 1989
- Full case name: Board of Trustees of State University of New York v. Fox
- Citations: 492 U.S. 469 (more) 109 S. Ct. 3028; 106 L. Ed. 2d 388; 1989 U.S. LEXIS 3289
- Argument: Oral argument

Case history
- Prior: Cert. to the United States Court of Appeals for the Second Circuit

Holding
- The Court of Appeals erred in requiring the District Court to apply a least restrictive means test to Resolution 66-156; so long as the means are narrowly tailored to achieve the desired objective, it is for governmental decisionmakers to judge what manner of regulation may be employed.

Court membership
- Chief Justice William Rehnquist Associate Justices William J. Brennan Jr. · Byron White; Thurgood Marshall · Harry Blackmun; John P. Stevens · Sandra Day O'Connor; Antonin Scalia · Anthony Kennedy

Case opinions
- Majority: Scalia, joined by Rehnquist, White, Stevens, O'Connor, Kennedy
- Dissent: Blackmun, joined by Brennan, Marshall

Laws applied
- U.S. Const. amend. I

Board of Trustees of State University of New York v. Fox, 492 U.S. 469 (1989), is a United States Supreme Court case in which the Court instructed a lower court to reevaluate the compatibility of a resolution of the State University of New York that prohibited private commercial enterprises from operating in SUNY facilities with the First Amendment. The Court instructed the lower court to use the standard outlined in Central Hudson Gas & Electric Corp. v. Public Service Commission (1980) and determine whether the restriction on speech advanced the state's interest and, if so, whether the state's method was the least restrictive means to that end. This approach ensures a balanced consideration, safeguarding the fundamental right to free speech while addressing the state's concerns in the most efficient and non-restrictive manner possible.
