= Sussex I State Prison =

Prison in Virginia, U.S.

Coordinates: 37°03′08″N 77°12′20″W

- Interactive map of Sussex I State Prison
- Location: 24414 Musselwhite Drive Waverly, Virginia
- Status: open
- Security class: maximum / mixed
- Capacity: 1139
- Opened: 1998
- Managed by: Virginia Department of Corrections
- Warden: Kemsy Bowles

Sussex I State Prison is a prison of the Virginia Department of Corrections located in unincorporated Sussex County, Virginia, near Waverly. It is adjacent to Sussex II State Prison, which lies to its northwest, just across Mussellwhite Drive.

The prison, a maximum security facility, opened in May 1998. It serves as an intake facility. It housed the state death row for men from the time it was moved from Mecklenburg Correctional Center in August, 1998 until the abolition of the death penalty in July, 2021. The actual execution chamber was at the Greensville Correctional Center.

== Security Concerns ==
In 2020, VADOC discovered that inmates at both Sussex I and Sussex II state prisons were able to jam their cell doors -- which allowed them to leave their cells without staff approval. This resulted in the cell doors not being able to close properly, which was identified as an immediate safety hazard. The agency commenced on a project to replace all cell doors in the facilities at a cost of $13.6 million dollars. In the meanwhile, each cell door was secured with a keyed padlock on a temporary basis with additional staff assigned to the cell house for the purposes of being able to unlock the cells in the event of a fire emergency in the unit. The installed temporary locking procedures were deemed in compliance by the Virginia State Fire Marshal's Office during a surprise inspection of Sussex I State Prison on March 23, 2022.
