= Buddy Justus =

American spree killer and rapist (1952–1990)

- Justus on the day of his execution
- Born: December 25, 1952; Niagara Falls, New York, U.S.
- Died: December 13, 1990 (aged 37); Virginia State Penitentiary, Virginia, U.S.
- Status: Executed by electrocution
- Motive: Rage over impending divorce Misogyny
- Convictions: Virginia; Capital murder Georgia; Murder; Kidnapping with bodily injury Rape; Armed robbery Florida; First degree murder
- Penalty: Death by electrocution

Details
- Victims: 4 (including an unborn child)
- Span of crimes: October 3 – 6, 1978
- Country: United States
- States: Virginia, Georgia, Florida

Buddy Earl Justus (December 25, 1952 – December 13, 1990) was an American spree killer who raped and murdered three women, including a pregnant woman, across Georgia, Florida, and Virginia in October 1978. Convicted of all three murders and sentenced to death in all three states, Justus was executed in Virginia in 1990.

== Early life ==
Justus was born in Niagara Falls, New York, on Christmas Day, 1952. He came from an abusive family, and eventually ended up in a Virginia orphanage.

Justus later married his adoptive mother, Alice. The marriage was extremely dysfunctional. Alice often accused her husband of infidelity and there were frequent separations. During one such separation, Justus tried to commit suicide twice and indicated he would try again unless his wife returned. Justus's spiritual adviser, Reverend Thomas Smith, later said that the murders were motivated by Justus's impending divorce. He said Justus "went crazy" after learning that Alice wanted a divorce.

Prior to the murders, Justus was employed at the tire shop owned by the father of a man named Paul Grenga, a former Assistant District Attorney in Niagara County, New York. The Justus case later inspired Grenga to helped author legislation to strength the penalties for crimes against pregnant women in New York.

== Murders ==
On October 3, 1978, Justus broke into the Ironto, Virginia trailer of Ida Mae Moses, 21, then raped, murdered, and mutilated her. Moses, a nurse, had been set to give birth in two weeks and had already planned a name for her unborn son.

Justus moved south, picking up an 18-year-old hitchhiker, Dale Goins, along the way. They kidnapped and murdered 32-year-old housewife Rosemary Jackson while she was leaving a store in Atlanta. Days later, in Florida, Justus and Goins kidnapped and murdered 21-year-old Stephanie Hawkins, who had been preparing for her son's birthday party. Justus was the triggerman in both murders and raped both women before killing them.

== Trial and execution ==
Justus was arrested on October 11, 1978, in Grundy, Virginia. He and Goins were tried for each of the three murders they had committed. Justus was convicted of killing Moses, Jackson, and Hawkins, receiving a death sentence for each murder. Goins, received multiple life sentences in Georgia and Florida after his lawyers successfully argued that he had a lesser role in the murders and had been coerced into participating by Justus. As of 2025, Goins is serving his life sentence in Georgia.

In 1983, Justus said he was planning to waive his appeals, but then changed his mind.

Justus twice tried to kill himself on death row.

After his appeals failed, Justus was executed in the electric chair at the Virginia State Penitentiary on December 13, 1990. His last meal consisted of steak, french fries, tossed salad, strawberry pie, and tea. A request for a glass of wine was denied. Inmates usually banged the bars whenever an execution took place, but this time, there was silence. The prison was almost empty since it was set to be closed the next day. Prison officials granted a final request by Justus to make his final steps to the electric chair by himself rather than with guards at his side.

Justus had no last words, but released a statement of apology a few days before his execution. In a morning interview with WFIR on the day of his execution, Justus wept after learning that the sister of Ida Moses called WFIR to say she forgave him. Justus said, "I want it to be over with, not for me, but for the victims' families. I'm ready to go to a better place. I want it to be put to rest. I've asked for forgiveness to a lot of people and I was able to forgive myself." He also admonished capital punishment, calling it "barbaric", and asking, "Let me be the last person."

"We are supposed to be a society that's supposed to be caring ... and that to continue capital punishment is taking steps backward. There's better ways to deal with it than to take lives."

Justus was the last man executed at the Virginia State Penitentiary. All subsequent executions in Virginia were carried out at Greensville Correctional Center.

== See also ==
- Capital punishment in Virginia
- List of people executed in Virginia
- List of people executed in the United States in 1990
