= Mitchells, Virginia =

Unincorporated community in Virginia, United States

- Unincorporated community
- Location within Virginia Location within the United States
- Coordinates: 38°22′37″N 78°01′42″W
- Country: United States
- State: Virginia
- County: Culpeper
- Elevation: 351 ft (107 m)
- Time zone: UTC-5 (Eastern (EST))
  - Summer (DST): UTC-4 (EDT)
- ZIP code: 22729
- Area code: 540
- GNIS feature ID: 1493299

Mitchells is an unincorporated community in Culpeper County, Virginia, United States. Mitchells is located on State Route 615, 6.8 miles (10.9 km) south-southwest of Culpeper. Mitchells has a post office with ZIP code 22729.

== Notable people ==
Andrew J. Boyle, U.S. Army lieutenant general, resided in Mitchells during his retirement.
