= Virginia State Penitentiary =

Closed prison in Richmond, Virginia, US

Coordinates: 37°32′22″N 77°26′53″W

Virginia State Penitentiary was a prison in Richmond, Virginia. Towards the end of its life it was a part of the Virginia Department of Corrections.

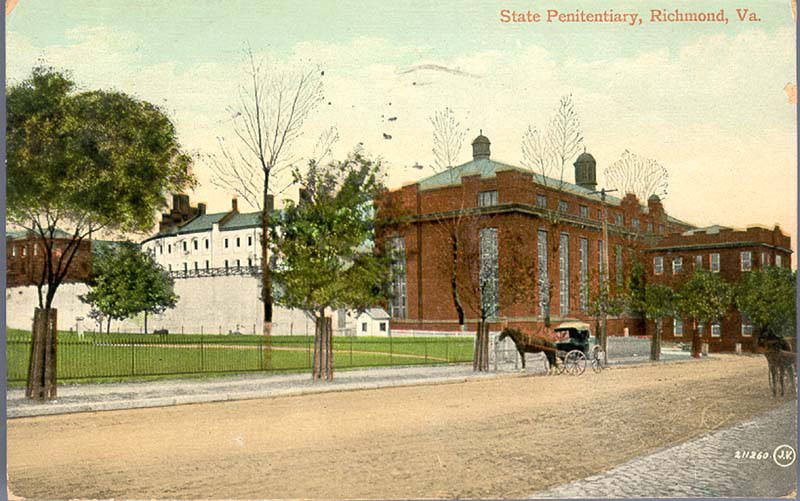
Early 1900s.

First opening in 1800, the prison was completed in 1804; it was built due to a reform movement preceding its construction. Thomas Jefferson initiated these reforms and submitted an initial design which was not constructed. The original building was the first American design of Benjamin Henry Latrobe, who later designed the U.S. Capitol building. In the early 19th-century, the penitentiary operated a nail factory that was staffed by its prisoners. It was in direct competition with Thomas Jefferson's nail factory and Catharine Flood McCall's Alexandria factory that were staffed by enslaved and free laborers. The Penitentiary became profitable in 1807 from prisoner-made nails and other products. By 1815, it undercut McCall's and Jefferson's businesses, both of which ultimately closed down.

The prison once housed Virginia's men's death row and execution chamber in Building A. In 1908, Virginia officials passed a bill to "establish a permanent place in the State Penitentiary at Richmond, Va. for the execution of state felons upon whom the death penalty [had] been imposed." The bill was amended to change Virginia's method of execution to the electric chair, signed by Governor Claude A. Swanson on March 16, 1908, and became effective starting July 1. The prison's first execution by electrocution was that of Henry Smith on October 13, 1908, in the basement of Building A.

In 1928 the original building was demolished and a new prison was erected on the same site in Richmond, just north of the James River. It expanded to occupy an entire campus of high-walled cellblocks and administrative buildings, in the block bordered by Byrd, Spring, Belvedere and South 2nd Streets.

The prison closed in 1991, and the execution chamber was moved to the Greensville Correctional Center near Jarratt. The Virginia State Penitentiary was demolished that year. The site is owned by Afton Chemical.

== Notable inmates ==
- Virginia Christian – Juvenile offender; executed for murdering her boss in 1912.
- Floyd Allen – Mass murderer convicted of his role in a courthouse shootout; executed on March 28, 1913. One of Floyd's sons, Claude, who participated in the shootings and was condemned to death as well, was executed 11 minutes after him.
- Odell Waller – Convicted murderer; executed in 1942.
- Martinsville Seven – Convicted rapists; all executed in 1951.
- Henry Lee Lucas – Serial killer; served time at the Virginia State Penitentiary for burglary in the 1950s.
- Jeremiah McCray – Serial killer; executed in 1958.
- Thomas Brooks III – Convicted murderer; served time at the Virginia State Penitentiary before being transferred to a prison work crew. He escaped in August 1970 and was never recaptured.
- Frank Joseph Coppola – Robbed and murdered a woman; executed on August 10, 1982, the first person executed in Virginia after the state reinstated capital punishment.
- Linwood Earl Briley – Serial killer, spree killer, and one of the Briley Brothers; executed on October 12, 1984.
- James Dyral Briley – Serial killer, spree killer, and one of the Briley Brothers; executed on April 18, 1985.
- Morris Odell Mason – "The Killer for the Eastern Shore"; executed on June 25, 1985.
- Wilbert Lee Evans – Convicted murderer; executed on October 17, 1990, in a botched execution.
- Buddy Earl Justus – Spree killer; executed on December 13, 1990, the last person executed at the Virginia State Penitentiary.
