= Lawrenceville Correctional Center =

Prison in Virginia, United States

Coordinates: 36°46′52″N 77°48′48″W

- Interactive map of Lawrenceville Correctional Center
- Location: 1607 Planters Road Lawrenceville, Virginia
- Status: open
- Security class: medium
- Capacity: 1555
- Opened: 1998; 28 years ago
- Managed by: GEO Group

The Lawrenceville Correctional Center is a medium-security state prison for men located in Lawrenceville, Brunswick County, Virginia. From 2003 to 2024, GEO Group operated the prison under contract with the Virginia Department of Corrections. On August 1, 2024, the state took over the prison. It houses 1555 inmates.

When the facility was first completed in 1998 as the first private prison in Virginia, it was managed by Corrections Corporation of America.
