= Mecklenburg Correctional Center =

Prison in Virginia, United States

Coordinates: 36°39′39″N 78°21′49″W

Mecklenburg Correctional Center was a maximum security prison operated by the Virginia Department of Corrections in unincorporated Mecklenburg County, Virginia, United States, near Boydton. It was closed in 2012 due to a decrease in the number of inmates in the Virginia corrections system and expensive ongoing maintenance needs. The 189 acres (76 ha) facility served as a reception and classification facility.

Mecklenburg formerly housed the Commonwealth of Virginia's male death row. It is located at (36.6607, -78.3636).

== History ==
It first opened in 1976. Opened at a cost of $20 million, this 360-inmate facility was intended to serve as the facility for the "worst of the worst" among inmates in the Virginia Department of Corrections system – a maximum security prison. At the opening ceremony, Governor Mills E. Godwin Jr. stated that the facility served as a "monument to failure", as the inmates to be housed there were viewed as the most incorrigible and likely unable to be returned to free society.

The first warden at Mecklenburg was Gene Johnson. Johnson's assistant warden for operations and security was Fred L. Finkbeiner, who had served as the warden of the well-known Joliet and Pontiac maximum-security prisons in Illinois.

On August 3, 1998, the male death row moved to its final location, the Sussex I State Prison, from the Mecklenburg Correctional Center. Capital punishment in Virginia was abolished in 2021.

=== The 1984 escape from death row ===
Six inmates facing the Virginia electric chair made an escape from the facility on May 31, 1984. The inmates who escaped included two of the Briley Brothers (Linwood and James), along with Lem Tuggle, Earl Clanton, Derick Peterson, and Willie Jones. They had observed how correctional officers were complacent and often failed to follow security procedures. While returning to the building from evening recreation time around 8:00 pm, Clanton hid in the bathroom next to the entrance of the death row cell block, then charged out on cue from another inmate when the adjacent control room's door was left open.

Clanton overpowered the officer inside and released all of the locks in the cell block. Inmates took over the block with homemade knives and blindfolded and bound responding officers, changing into their uniforms. Death row inmates Wilbert Lee Evans and Willie Lloyd Turner had participated in planning meetings for the escape months prior, but they ultimately did not participate; guards later stated that Evans and Turner also prevented the escaping inmates from harming any prison workers, and at least one stated he "[owed] his life" to Evans and Turner. Evans's attorneys in particular argued that his role in protecting guards in the escape should have earned him mercy from execution. Evans was ultimately executed in the electric chair in 1990, and Turner was executed by lethal injection in 1995.

The escaping inmates bluffed their way out of the prison by calling the front gate of the prison and pretending to be officers who needed a van supplied and both gates opened to aid in the disposal of a bomb supposedly constructed by the inmates. The bomb was actually a portable TV covered with a blanket. The group correctly deduced that the prison had no set protocol for bomb disposal and so the gate officer could be fooled into opening both gates at the same time, in violation of standard procedure.

The six escapees put on riot helmets to conceal their faces and carried the TV out of the unit on a stretcher while spraying it with a fire extinguisher. They put it into the waiting van, which they drove straight out of the prison at 10:47 pm. Once the six men were free, they crossed into nearby North Carolina. Unable to agree on their next move, they soon split up in the town of Warrenton and abandoned the van in a schoolyard.

Clanton and Peterson were caught the following afternoon, on June 1, in Warrenton. A patrol car driving past a laundromat spotted the two men inside, one of them wearing what appeared to be a correctional officers' jacket with the badges torn off. They had stopped to eat cheese and drink wine from a convenience store.

Tuggle, Jones and the Briley brothers stole a pickup truck with the vanity tag 'PEI-1' from the driveway of its owner. The Brileys were dropped off in Philadelphia, Pennsylvania, where a local uncle got them a job at a North Philadelphia car garage under assumed names. Tuggle and Jones planned to continue north into Canada, as they knew that Canadian authorities would not extradite fugitives facing execution. They got as far north as Vermont, where Tuggle was apprehended in Stamford on June 8 after robbing a souvenir shop for $80.

Jones gave himself up the following day, on June 9, just five miles south of the Canada–US border in Jay, Vermont. He was cold, hungry, and bitten by flies, so he called his mother, who persuaded him to turn himself in. Tuggle and Jones were housed at Marble Valley Correctional Facility in Rutland, pending extradition back to Virginia.

The Brileys were caught last, on June 19, after the FBI traced a phone call they made to a contact in New York City back to the garage where they were working. All six men were returned to Virginia under heavy security. Upon their return, they were held on $10 million bond each.

Much of what has been revealed about the escape came from fellow inmate Dennis Stockton. Stockton was also on death row for murder and originally planned to escape with them, but backed out because he anticipated his case would be overturned on appeal. During the escape, he wrote down everything that happened minute by minute in his diaries, which were later published in a Norfolk, Virginia newspaper, the Virginian Pilot. Stockton did not succeed in his appeal and was executed in 1995.

==== Execution dates of escapees ====
- Linwood Briley – October 12, 1984
- James Briley – April 18, 1985
- Earl Clanton – April 14, 1988
- Derick Peterson – August 22, 1991
- Willie Leroy Jones – September 11, 1992
- Lem Tuggle – December 12, 1996

All were executed by electrocution, except for Tuggle, who was executed by lethal injection.

==== Crimes of each escapee ====
- Linwood Briley – Shot and killed Disc jockey John Gallaher in 1979 after kidnapping and robbing him in Richmond, Virginia. Briley also committed at least ten other murders with his brothers James and Anthony.
- James Briley – Robbed and murdered Harvey Wilkerson, his son Harvey Jr. and Judy Barton at a Richmond, Virginia home in 1979. The victims had all been shot, Barton was also raped. Briley also committed at least eight other murders with his brothers Linwood and Anthony
- Earl Clanton – Stabbed and strangled Wilhemina Smith during a robbery of her Petersburg, Virginia apartment in 1980. Clanton was previously convicted of another murder in New Jersey in 1972.
- Derick Peterson – Shot and killed Howard Kauffman during a Hampton, Virginia grocery store robbery in 1982.
- Willie Leroy Jones – Robbed and murdered Graham and Myra Adkins at their rural Richmond area home in 1983.
- Lem Tuggle – Raped and murdered Jessie Havens in 1983 in Smyth County, Virginia. Tuggle was previously convicted of killing Shirley Brickey in 1971.

=== Reforms following the escapes ===
The 1984 escapes resulted in the Virginia corrections system undertaking reforms, and several personnel being adversely affected. The director of the Department of Corrections was forced to resign. The warden of the facility, Gary Bass, was transferred from that position. In federal courtroom testimony in a case involving the prison on September 27, 1984, Bass stated that various lawsuits against the prison had weakened morale among corrections staff and left them feeling that the "ACLU was running the prison".

In the years that followed the 1984 escape, the department undertook many reforms at Mecklenburg Correctional Center. Educational programs were introduced for inmates, as well as work details. COs received better training, to reduce prisoner abuse and ensure that force was used only when emergency situations warranted it. The number of inmate-on-CO assaults dropped significantly in the following years.

=== Facility reclassification ===
The prison was proposed for closure by Governor L. Douglas Wilder in 1993. However, the succeeding administration of Virginia Governor George Allen determined that Mecklenburg should remain open, reclassifying it from a maximum security to medium security 'intake' facility. During the prison's last decade of operation, it was used to house inmates short term. They were newly convicted and spent a few months at Mecklenburg before being classified based on their security risk and reassigned to other prisons.

Death row was moved from this facility to Sussex I State Prison near Waverly, Virginia in 1997.

== Closure ==
In 2011, Virginia Governor Bob McDonnell ordered MCC closed, citing removal of 1,000 Pennsylvania inmates who were housed at another facility (Green Rock Correctional Center) under contract. MCC closed May 24, 2012 and was slated for demolition in 2013. The Virginia Department of Corrections plans to limit what is sent to a landfill to just 50 tons of demolition debris, or 2 percent of the project’s estimated total. In November 2017, the demolition of the center was completed and the land was deeded to the town of Boydton. It has been zoned M-1 for possible future industrial use. In 2023, Microsoft corporation had purchased this land and began constructing additional facilities to expand its existing Boydton data center.

== See also ==
- List of prison escapes
