= Virginia Department of Corrections =

- Uniform patch for the Virginia Department of Corrections
- Abbreviation: VADOC

Agency overview
- Formed: late 1700s
- Employees: 11,769
- Annual budget: $1,364,068,980

Jurisdictional structure
- Operations jurisdiction: Virginia, USA
- Map of Virginia Department of Corrections's jurisdiction
- Area: 42,774 square miles (110,780 km^{2})
- Population: 8,096,604 (2011 census)
- General nature: Civilian police

Operational structure
- Headquarters: Richmond, Virginia
- Elected officer responsible: Terrance Cole, Secretary of Public Safety
- Agency executive: Joseph W. Walters, Director

Facilities
- Facilities and Offices: 39

Website
- VADOC Website

The Virginia Department of Corrections (VADOC) is the government agency responsible for community corrections and operating prisons and correctional facilities in the Commonwealth of Virginia in the United States. The agency is fully accredited by the American Correctional Association and is one of the oldest functioning correctional agencies in the United States. Its headquarters is located in the state capital of Richmond.

== History ==
From the time of the first settlement at Jamestown to the relocation of the state capital to Richmond in the late 18th Century, Virginia relied upon corporal and capital punishment as its penal measures. Gradually, Virginia began to use small county jails for sentences of confinement.

After the Revolutionary War, Virginia Governor Thomas Jefferson began to urge the state to construct a "penitentiary house." At that time, penitentiary houses were then beginning being used throughout Europe to confine and reform criminals. However, for more than a decade, the Virginia General Assembly ignored Jefferson's ideas.

In 1796, a wave of reform swept the General Assembly of Virginia, and the famous British-American architect Benjamin Henry Latrobe, (1764-1820), (later Architect of the Capitol) was hired to design a penitentiary house for the newly formed Virginia Department of Welfare and Institutions. Latrobe's facility was constructed on a site outside of Richmond overlooking the James River. The facility, which received its first prisoners in 1800 and was completed (with using prison labor) in 1804, (earlier than the current oldest state prison in America, the still standing Eastern State Penitentiary (1829-1971) in Philadelphia and seven years before the neighboring Maryland Penitentiary (now Metropolitan Transitional Center and centerpiece of an extensive corrections complex) began in downtown Baltimore) was known by generations of Virginians as the "Virginia State Penitentiary" or "The Pen." The structure later burned and was torn down in 1905. A new facility was built and operated continuously afterwards until it too was demolished in 1992. In 1896, a penal farm operation (James River Correctional Center) was established in Goochland County for "miscreants and the infirm." This facility closed April 1, 2011, but the James River Work Center continues to operate in that same location today.

"Community Corrections" philosophy and policy officially began being used in the Commonwealth of Virginia on October 1, 1942, designated as the Probation and Parole Services Agency, with the employees of the division referred to as Probation and Parole Officers. By an act of the Virginia General Assembly in 1944, the VADOC was officially formed out of the former Virginia Department of Welfare and Institutions, the Virginia Parole Board, and the Virginia Department of Probation and Parole Services. Today, the VADOC oversees all operations of the Commonwealth's corrections facilities.

== Organizational structure ==
The VADOC is an agency of the Virginia Office of Public Safety. Virginia Secretary of Public Safety Terrance Cole oversees 12 government agencies, including the VADOC. The VADOC's department director Chadwick Dotson was appointed to the position by Governor Glenn Youngkin in September 2023 to succeed Harold Clarke, who had announced his retirement after serving as director since November 2010. Dotson, a retired judge, had previously served as the chair of the Virginia Parole Board.

Underneath the director are three divisions — Operations, Re-entry & Programs and Communication, and Administration — each overseen by a deputy director.

- The Chief of Corrections Operations manages the regional facilities' day-to-day operations as well as probation and parole activities. The Operations division is also responsible for ensuring VADOC compliance with the Prison Rape Elimination Act (PREA) and the Americans with Disabilities Act (ADA). Community Corrections is also responsible for completing risk assessments on certain sexual offenders for the courts and providing victims with information.
- The Chief Deputy Director oversees Re-entry & Programs, Communication, and Victim Services.
- The Deputy Director of Administration manages the agency's core business activities, including Human Resources, Information Technology, Finance, and Virginia Correctional Enterprises.

== Re-entry initiative ==
In May 2010, Governor Bob McDonnell signed Executive Order Number Eleven establishing the Virginia Prisoner and Juvenile Offender Re-entry Council. The Council was formed to tie together the re-entry initiative amongst the state agencies, local agencies, and community organizations. The Secretary of Public Safety then composed a task force to further develop the Virginia Adult Re-entry Initiative, or VARI. The plan gave directions for streamlining services, shifting some organizational practices, and establishing new ways to measure achievement while keeping with the public safety practices, which Governor McDonnell listed as top priority.

Through the Re-entry Program, offenders are evaluated upon arrival to the facility to determine the best strategy for their re-entry preparation plan. They are also tested to determine their risk for recidivism. An initial Re-entry Case Plan is developed and typically updated depending on the offender's actions. Workshops and programs are made available to prepare the offender for re-entry into the community.

As of December 2023, there were 23,604 offenders housed in VADOC facilities. This was a decrease of twenty percent in the inmate population from just four years earlier when there were 29,347 inmates in the system. A 2011 study showed among the 36 states that report felon recidivism — defined as re-imprisonment within three years of release — Virginia has the fourth lowest recidivism rate in the United States.

== Facilities ==
List of Virginia state prisons

=== Dress code regulations of facilities ===
The dress code for visitors includes no tube tops, halter tops, mini-skirts, leggings, form fitting clothing, and revealing necklines and/or excessive splits. No denim is allowed.

=== Death row ===
Prior to the abolition of capital punishment in Virginia in 2021, male death row was located at the Sussex I State Prison, while females were housed at the Fluvanna Correctional Center for Women. Prior to August 3, 1998, the male death row was housed at Mecklenburg Correctional Center. The execution chamber was located at the Greensville Correctional Center near Jarratt.

Through 1990, the male death row was located at the Virginia State Penitentiary in Richmond, which began hosting executions on October 13, 1908. After the prison building was replaced in 1928, the men's death row and the execution chamber were housed in Building A. The execution chamber was moved from the Virginia State Penitentiary to Greensville in 1991.

== Legal issues and controversies ==
=== Human Rights Watch: Red Onion ===
A 1999 report by Human Rights Watch raised concerns over conditions at Red Onion State Prison. The report states that "the Virginia Department of Corrections has failed to embrace basic tenets of sound correctional practice and laws protecting inmates from abusive, degrading or cruel treatment" and claims that "racism, excessive violence and inhumane conditions reign inside."

=== ADA compliance (Minnis et al. v. Johnson et al.) ===
In January 2010, complaints against the VADOC were filed in US District Court stating deaf and hard of hearing inmates could not properly communicate with friends and family outside the facility, had no visual notifications for safety announcements in the facilities, and had limited access to sign-language interpreters. In November 2010, after reviewing the complaints, the VADOC became the first corrections department in the country to install videophones, allowing deaf and hard of hearing inmates to communicate with friends and family outside the facility. In addition, sign language versions of rules, proceedings, medical appointments, meals, and events were also made available, and interpreters were brought in twice a week.

=== Reading material restrictions (Couch v. Jabe et al.) ===
The department permits the circulation of some softcore sexual-orientation magazines such as "Playboy". Previously, some classic literature books with erotica, such as "Ulysses" by James Joyce, "Lady Chatterley's Lover" by D. H. Lawrence, and "Fanny Hill" were banned. In 2010, as a result of a lawsuit filed by an inmate, a Federal court instructed the state corrections agency to begin permitting the circulation of the books.

=== Strip searches ===
In December 2019, press reports indicated that an eight-year-old was ordered to strip naked in order to be searched before she was allowed to visit her father. A spokesman for the department apologized.

=== Tampon ban ===
In September 2018, the department made headlines for banning female visitors to inmates from wearing tampons or menstrual cups in concerns over contraband being smuggled into the prisons. The ban was rescinded that same month after a public outcry and inquiry from the ACLU.

== See also ==
- List of United States state correction agencies
- List of law enforcement agencies in Virginia
- Prison
