= Missing persons cases along U.S. Route 29 in Virginia =

U.S. Route 29 (Virginia) list of missing persons cases

Since 1996, there has been an unusually high number of cases involving young women disappearing along U.S. Route 29 (US 29) in Virginia, or an area known as the "Route 29 Corridor". Five young women disappeared in five years between 2009 and 2014, earning it a particularly notorious reputation. Of the nine murders/disappearances, only the cases of Morgan Dana Harrington (2009), Alexis Murphy (2013) and Hannah Graham (2014) were solved ending in convictions of their murderers, the other cases are still unsolved.

== Route 29 ==
Route 29 is a United States federal highway that stretches from Pensacola, Florida to Silver Spring, Maryland. It was originally constructed in October 1925. Currently, U.S. Route 29 stretches around 1,036 miles up and down the East coast. It has also been more recently known for a number of disappearances since 1996.

== Possible serial killer ==
Richard Marc Evonitz was a serial killer active in the area from 1996 until 2002. While it was never confirmed, Evonitz was also suspected of being the Route 29 Stalker. In hindsight, detectives had claimed that it was highly unlikely to have multiple offenders in one area at one time. Evonitz was involved in the murder of three girls from Spotsylvania County, Virginia and the kidnapping and assault of a teenage girl in South Carolina. In addition, Evonitz was also suspected of two rapes prior to his offenses in Spotsylvania County. This was never confirmed.

In June 2002, Evonitz committed suicide by shooting himself in the head with his handgun as he was surrounded by police.

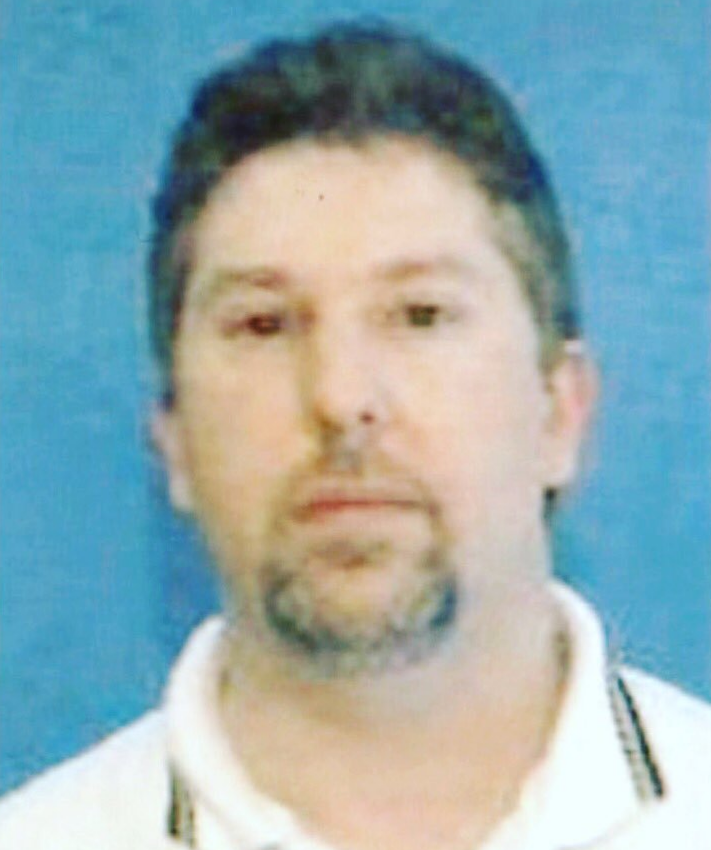
Richard Evonitz

== Route 29 "Stalker" ==
The route 29 stalker was never caught nor identified after over 20 years. Police and investigators are still unsure whether the route 29 stalker was Richard Marc Evonitz, the serial killer active in the area around the same time.

According to witnesses on Route 29, an unidentified stalker would flag down women who appeared to be driving alone. The incidents reported of the Route 29 stalker occurred between Manassas, Virginia and Charlottesville, Virginia.

== Cases ==
=== Alicia Showalter Reynolds ===
Alicia Showalter Reynolds disappeared on her drive to Charlottesville, Virginia, to shop with her mother on March 2, 1996. Sources say Reynolds never made it to her destination. Alicia is thought to be the first of many disappearances along U.S. Route 29.

Police claim Alicia's killer must have known the area in which her body was found. Alicia's remains were found in what was said to be the middle of an isolated field that sources claim only a local could have known about near the Lignum area in Culpeper County, on May 7, 1996. Neighbors of the area say they only found the remains once they noticed vultures circling the area, however, the police stated she was most likely murdered the day she was abducted. Originally, officials believed Alicia was a victim of Richard Marc Evonitz, a serial killer active during her disappearance. This was never confirmed, and Reynolds' case still remains cold today.

=== Julianne Williams and Laura "Lollie" Winans ===
Julianne Williams, 24, and Laura "Lollie" Winans, 26, were found dead at their campsite in Shenandoah National Park in May 1996. In June 2024, a deceased convicted rapist from Ohio, Walter "Leo" Jackson Sr., was identified as a suspect based on DNA testing, but was not considered a suspect for other cases along Route 29.

=== Anne Carolyn McDaniel ===
20-year-old Anne Carolyn McDaniel was last seen leaving a group home in the town of Orange on September 18, 1996. Her burned remains were found four days later within just 10 miles (16 km) of the location where Alicia Showalter Reynolds's body was found.

=== Morgan Dana Harrington ===
Morgan Dana Harrington was a 20-year-old student at Virginia Tech when she disappeared from Charlottesville near John Paul Jones Arena while attending a Metallica concert on October 17, 2009. Her body was found at Anchorage Farm in Albemarle County months later on January 26, 2010. On September 15, 2015, Jesse Matthew was formally charged with first degree murder and abduction with intent to defile in the murder of Morgan Harrington.

=== Samantha Clarke ===
19-year-old Samantha Ann Clarke was last seen in Orange shortly after midnight on September 13, 2010. On Friday, January 15, 2021, the Town of Orange Police Department reclassified her disappearance as a murder. “Due to new information and advances in investigative and forensic technology, Samantha’s missing person investigation has been reclassified as an active abduction and murder investigation,” according to OPD Chief.

=== Sage Smith ===
Sage Smith, also known as Dashad and Unique, was a 19-year-old transgender woman who went missing on November 20, 2012. She was last seen waiting for a date near downtown Charlottesville, approximately three and a half miles south of the Albemarle County location where Alexis Murphy's abandoned car was found in August 2013. Erik McFadden was the last person known to have seen Sage before her disappearance. Shortly after telling Charlottesville police he and Sage had made plans to meet that day and agreeing to a further interview, McFadden went missing for over a decade. Though Sage Smith's case had gone cold and remains unsolved, in November 2025 police announced they had located McFadden in Los Angeles while he was in the process of trying to change his name. Erik McFadden remains a person of interest in the case, with police asking to hear from anyone who has information regarding him and his whereabouts since he went missing.

=== Alexis Murphy ===
Alexis Tiara Murphy, a 17-year-old, went missing after leaving her home in Shipman, reportedly headed to Lynchburg on August 3, 2013. She was seen on security footage at a gas station in Lovingston, Virginia, and her car was later found outside a theater off US 29 just north of Charlottesville. Her remains were discovered on private property on December 20, 2020, and were positively identified by a Virginia crime lab on February 5, 2021. Law enforcement waited to announce confirmation to the public until February 17, 2021, in order to allow the family time to grieve and make proper arrangements. Despite not knowing the location of Alexis' body until 2020, a suspect was taken into custody and charged with her abduction in 2013. Randy Taylor was later found guilty of first-degree murder in the commission of an abduction and abduction with intent to defile in connection with the disappearance of Murphy.

=== Hannah Graham ===
Hannah Elizabeth Graham, 18-year-old University of Virginia student went missing and was last seen at the Downtown Mall in Charlottesville on the early morning of September 13, 2014. On September 24, 2014, Jesse L. Matthew was arrested in Galveston County, Texas, while being wanted for the abduction and abduction with intent to defile Graham. On October 18, 2014, Graham's remains were found at an abandoned property in Albemarle County, Virginia. Jesse L. Matthew was scheduled to appear in court on December 4, 2014. Matthew entered an Alford plea and was sentenced to three life terms.

=== Bonnie Santiago ===
Bonnie Santiago, a 56-year-old woman, was last seen by her boyfriend on July 12, 2014, at his residence in the Carter Mountain Orchards area in Albemarle County, Virginia. Her van was located a few days later in which there was evidence of a violent struggle as blood was found at the scene, and there were footprints on the inside of the windshield. Santiago's belongings, including medication for her heart condition, were left inside.

In 2016, a warrant filled in Augusta County revealed that a septic tank near Craigsville was futilely drained in search of her body.

== Potential links between cases ==
Given the short time frame and similarities between the cases, specifically the small geographic region where they occurred and the age and gender of the victims, it is often wondered whether the cases are linked.

Taylor, the man charged with the abduction of Murphy, was a friend of Clarke's and is known to have called her cell phone several times on the night of her disappearance, but he has never been charged with anything in relation to her case. Despite many people suggesting Taylor was the Route 29 Stalker, police have said there is nothing linking him to the case, and Taylor was in prison when Reynolds was killed.
