= Murder of Alexis Murphy =

2013 child murder in Virginia, U.S.

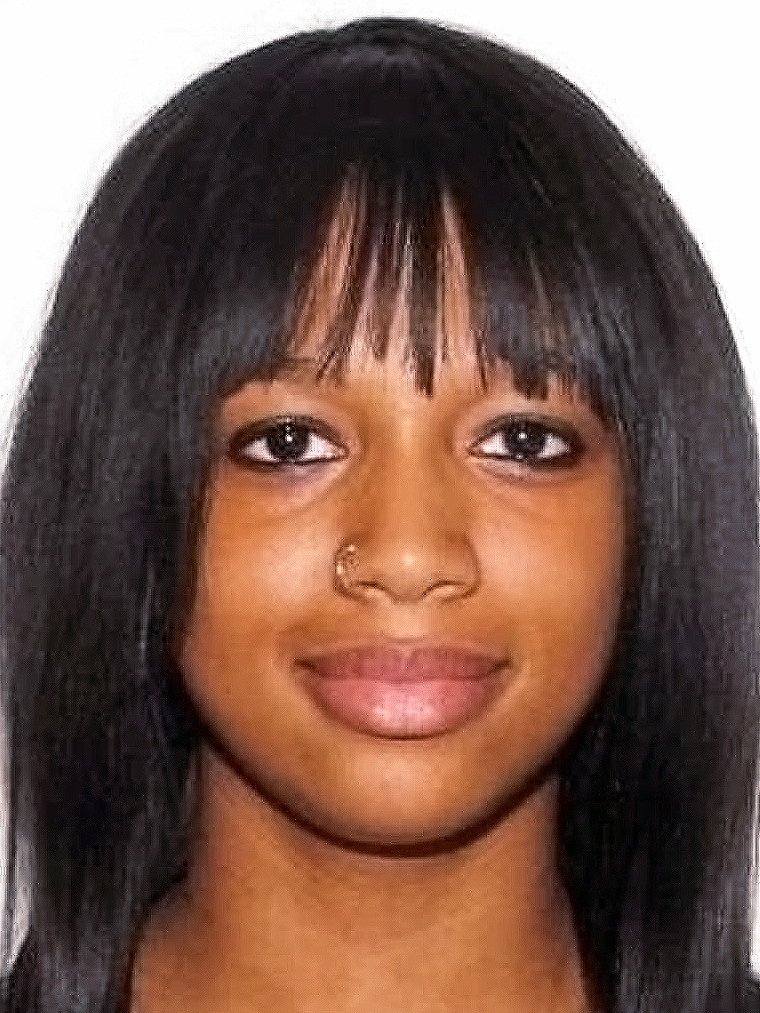
- Murphy in 2013
- Location: Lovingston, Virginia, U.S
- Date: August 3, 2013
- Attack type: Murder, abduction
- Victim: Alexis Murphy
- Perpetrator: Randy Taylor
- Charges: First-degree murder; First-degree felony murder; Abduction
- Verdict: Guilty of all charges
- Sentence: Life imprisonment

Alexis Tiara Murphy (June 5, 1996 – August 3, 2013) was a 17-year-old teenager who was murdered in Lovingston, Virginia, on August 3, 2013. Murphy, a student of Nelson County, Virginia, disappeared after last being seen at a gas station in Lovingston. Evidence was recovered from a vehicle and camper (referred to as a trailer by some outlets) belonging to 48-year-old Randy Taylor. Despite the absence of Murphy's body, Taylor was arrested and prosecuted for Murphy's kidnapping and murder.

Taylor was put on trial on May 1, 2014. He was found guilty a week later and given two life sentences. Taylor was also linked to the disappearance of Virginia teenager Samantha Clarke, who went missing in 2010.

On December 3, 2020, remains were located on private property in Lovingston. The remains were transported to the Central District Office of the Chief Medical Examiner (OCME) in Richmond and positively identified as Alexis Murphy on February 5, 2021. The identification of the remains was not announced publicly until February 17, 2021, to allow Murphy's family time to grieve and make proper arrangements.

== Disappearance ==
On August 3, 2013, Alexis Tiara Murphy left her home in Shipman, Virginia, to travel to Lynchburg. She was last seen at a Liberty gas station in Lovingston, Virginia, on the evening of August 3, where she was driving a white 2003 Nissan Maxima. In the following days, she was reported as missing and a search was launched. Murphy's car was found on August 6 in Albemarle County, where it had been abandoned in a theater parking lot. On August 10, the police announced that they were trying to identify photographs of persons seen in close proximity to Murphy. The following day, a suspect, later identified as Randy Taylor, was arrested.

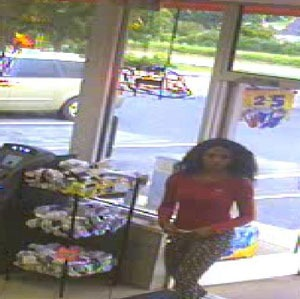
Surveillance Photo showing the last sighting of Murphy at a Liberty gas station.

== Investigation ==
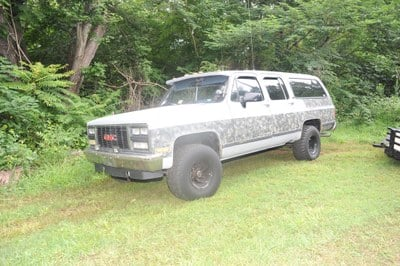
Randy Allen Taylor's late-model GMC Suburban

Prior to arresting Taylor, police investigated him as one of several people who appeared on the gas station's surveillance video. Taylor was seen holding the door for Murphy as she entered the store. Her 2003 Nissan Maxima was later captured following Taylor’s camouflaged Suburban. The cars appeared to head north on U.S. 29 in the direction of Taylor’s camper. The police searched Taylor's camper, where they found a strand of Murphy's hair. As Taylor lived near a river, dive teams and canine units conducted a search and found a red sweater. The sweater was initially speculated to have belonged to Murphy, but an investigator later stated otherwise. Several cell phones were also found and sent to the FBI lab in Quantico for testing. Authorities found DNA evidence that Murphy had been in Taylor's camper.

On September 24, 2013, Taylor was indicted on two felony charges. In January 2014, Taylor was indicted on charges of first-degree murder, first-degree felony murder and abduction with the intent to defile, as well as an unrelated grand larceny charge and was denied bond. Investigators searched Taylor's property shortly before he was set to be tried.

== Trial and sentencing ==
Taylor's case was brought to trial on May 1, 2014. Jury selection took about eight hours to complete and the trial was presided over by Judge Michael Gamble. Judge Gamble issued a gag order to prevent law enforcement officials, lawyers and their employees from speaking publicly about the case. Taylor pleaded not guilty to the charges of murder, stating that while Murphy had been in his camper, she had arrived with another man, Damien Brown, in order to buy marijuana and that the two had left together. His lawyer, Michael Hallahan, argued that law enforcement did not fully investigate this claim and focused predominantly on Taylor despite Brown leaving the state shortly after Murphy disappeared.

Evidence brought against Taylor included testimony from a cashier at the gas station, a bloody T-shirt; and evidence pulled from Taylor's camper, which included the strand of hair, a torn fingernail, and a diamond earring stud. Hallahan had made a pretrial attempt to suppress statements and the evidence found via search warrants, but this was denied.

On May 8, Taylor was found guilty on the charges of first-degree murder in the commission of an abduction and abduction with intent to defile in connection with the disappearance of Murphy. During the sentencing, Taylor tried to bargain for a lesser sentence. He said that a third person had been involved and that he would reveal the location of the body in exchange for a twenty-year sentence; Taylor's offer was declined.

On July 23, 2014, Taylor was given two life sentences.

On December 3, 2020, Murphy's remains were located in Lovingston. The identification of the remains was not announced publicly until February 17, 2021.

== Jesse Matthew link and appeal ==
In October 2014, shortly after the remains of Hannah Graham were discovered, Taylor requested that authorities perform a DNA test on Jesse Matthew. Taylor's lawyer alleged that because Matthew had been linked to several disappearances, including that of Morgan Dana Harrington, he could have been responsible for Murphy's disappearance. Hallahan also requested a social media analysis to see if Murphy had ever contacted Matthew via any of her social media accounts. Nelson County Commonwealth's Attorney Anthony Martin remarked there was nothing to tie the two cases together but ran the requested tests, which ruled Matthew out as a suspect.

In December of the same year, Taylor filed an appeal, claiming that he did not receive a fair trial and that he received poor representation from Hallahan. His appeal was denied in May 2015 and a second appeal was filed with the Supreme Court of Virginia. His second appeal was denied in February 2016.

== See also ==
- List of kidnappings
- List of solved missing person cases (post-2000)
- Missing persons cases along U.S. Route 29 in Virginia
