= Red Onion State Prison =

Prison in Virginia, U.S.

- Location in Virginia
- Location: Wise County, Virginia; 37°6′40″N 82°33′00″W
- Status: Operational
- Security class: Supermax
- Capacity: 848
- Population: 713 (July 2011)
- Opened: August 1998
- Managed by: Virginia Department of Corrections
- Director: Joseph Walters
- Warden: Rick White
- Website: vadoc.virginia.gov/facilities/western/redonion/

Red Onion State Prison (ROSP) is a supermax state prison located in unincorporated Wise County, Virginia, near Pound. Operated by the Virginia Department of Corrections (VADOC), it houses about 800 inmates. The prison opened in August 1998.

It was the model for and is practically identical to Wallens Ridge State Prison in Big Stone Gap, the state's second supermax facility, which opened in 1999.

== Background ==
Plans were announced in 1992 to build a prison on Red Onion Mountain, with cost of construction estimated at $52 million. 375 acres of land were donated by the Pittston Coal Company, which reserved some rights to mineral extraction. Many residents of Wise County supported constructing the prison because of jobs it would provide and because it would remain relatively isolated. One official said: "It's off the beaten path. You won't even know it's there." The prison was designed by Daniel, Mann, Johnson & Mendenhall, a subdivision of AECOM since 1984.

The final cost of construction was over $70 million, with ground broken in 1995. As of 1999, the prison employed almost 800 people. Many of the corrections officers arrived at Red Onion after being laid off from jobs in nearby coalfields.

Red Onion is one of six new prisons built in Virginia between 1995 and 2000. It thus contributed an increase in capacity to the Virginia Corrections system that allowed the state to contractually accept inmates from outside the state. In 1999, the District of Columbia Department of Corrections was paying the Virginia Department of Corrections to house 69 prisoners at the Red Onion State Prison. These contracts were substantially reduced in 2004, when VADOC announced that it needed more supermax space for Virginians. In 2011, VADOC reported only 15 out-of-state inmates at Red Onion: two from Pennsylvania and thirteen from the U.S. Virgin Islands.

== Population ==
Red Onion is a "supermax" prison, intended to incarcerate "the worst of the worst." Critics of the prison have alleged that many inmates are sent to Red Onion not because they have committed severe crimes but because they broke rules at other facilities. Some 55% of Red Onion's prisoners have sentences longer than 15 years, and 12% have life sentences.

Red Onion was for many years the home of surviving "Beltway sniper" Lee Boyd Malvo. It also used to hold convicted murderer and activist Joseph Giarratano, who for some time was allowed to teach a course on nonviolence.

== Conditions ==
More than two-thirds of prisoners at Red Onion are held in solitary confinement, or "segregation". They are confined to their cells 23 hours per day in 8’ x 10’ cells with 6” x 24” windows for light. Length of confinement ranges from two weeks to fourteen years. Food and medicine are served through trays in the cell door.

Opportunities for education and work are more limited than in most prisons due to the higher security level; however, Red Onion offers janitorial work, a GED program, and a literacy program. The prison uses a video education system which allows the playing of prerecorded video files over 5" CCTV screens.

The facility was designed to minimize contact between corrections officers and prisoners as well as among prisoners.

=== Human rights criticisms ===
A 1999 report by Human Rights Watch raised concerns over conditions in Red Onion. The report states that "Virginia Department of Corrections has failed to embrace basic tenets of sound correctional practice and laws protecting inmates from abusive, degrading or cruel treatment" and claims that "racism, excessive violence and inhumane conditions reign inside." In 2001, Amnesty International released another report citing human rights violations at Red Onion.

Critics note that Red Onion's solitary confinement rate is the highest in the Virginia prison system. A reported 173 of the prisoners in solitary confinement have been diagnosed with mental illnesses, and some contend that isolation exacerbates their conditions and limits their ability to get treatment.

"Control Unit Torture", art created by Red Onion inmate Kevin "Rashid" Johnson

The reports also cite the use of firearms with live ammunition by guards (an unusual practice in American prisons), which has led to inmate injuries. They also object to the use of electroshock weapons by guards. Critics also point to "five point restraints" as an instance of cruel punishment. These are devices that guards use to physically restrain inmates. They are officially used to limit movement of prisoners who threaten themselves or others, but critics such as Amnesty International have argued that guards use them for punishment and torture.

Mac Gaskins, a prisoner at Red Onion for fourteen years, reported: "having your fingers broken inside of these places, being bitten by dogs, being strapped to beds for days, as we've talked about many times, being forced to defecate on yourself – I mean all of this has led to these men demanding to be treated as human beings. It's like if you are put inside prison, you forfeit that right to be treated as a human being." Gaskins also reported that prisoners were denied access to soap, toothpaste, and books. Kevin "Rashid" Johnson, prison artist and organizer, has for years reported multiple instances of brutality and mistreatment from officers.

Advocates for Red Onion prisoners also note that the majority of those incarcerated are African Americans from Richmond or Northern Virginia, whereas most of the corrections officers are whites from Appalachia. It is suggested that this racial disparity leads to active racism which exacerbates the human rights abuses.

Human Rights Watch complained that much was still unknown about the prison, as a result of the difficulty of seeing inside or communicating with prisoners. Mother Jones reported that inmates were required to wear electroshock "stun belts" while meeting with outside investigators.

Inmate Kawaski Bass died after being attacked by another prisoner in his cell on September 9, 2011. His family accuses the warden and guards on duty of ignoring screams for help, and has filed a lawsuit against them, Red Onion State Prison, and the state of Virginia.

=== Response to criticisms ===
Prison officials confirm that isolation is normal at Red Onion, but argue that they do not engage in the cruel practice known as "solitary confinement". They also disagree with complaints about access and say that prisoners can receive visits from attorneys, and from family and friends for four hours a month.

Former Governor Bob McDonnell stated: "People behind bars have civil rights. At the same time, we have a duty to promote public safety. If people show, even in prison, that they can't get along with other prisoners, then they are treated accordingly." Former VADOC director Ronald J. Angelone, during whose term (1994–2002) Red Onion was designed and opened, defended the supermax system as necessary to avoid violence, saying: "There is no Department of Corrections magic wand that makes them decent human beings while in prison. They have to be housed appropriately so that the employees and the other inmates aren't subjected to violent behavior."

Former Virginia state senator Kenneth W. Stolle, who served as chairman of the Virginia State Crime Commission, has argued that rehabilitation at Red Onion is less important because so many prisoners serve life sentences, saying: "If they're getting out, obviously we have a responsibility to make sure they at least have an opportunity to be functioning members of society. Most people envisioned that Red Onion and Wallens Ridge were going to be dedicated to people with life sentences." The state announced that it would restrict the use of restraints as punishment in response to the report from Human Rights Watch.

=== Department of Justice investigation ===
Responding to the report from Human Rights Watch, the U.S. Department of Justice announced that in October 2000 that it would open an investigation. The Virginia Department of Corrections announced plans in March 2012 to review solitary confinement policies at Red Onion. A Washington Post report suggested that this announcement would continue to postpone action by the Department of Justice.

=== Hunger strike ===
On May 22, 2012, inmates in Red Onion began a hunger strike to bring "abusive prison conditions to light". The prisoners said: "Regardless of sexual preference, gang affiliation, race and religion, there are only two classes at this prison: the oppressor and the oppressed. We the oppressed are coming together. We're considered rival gang members, but now we're coming together as revolutionaries. We're tired of being treated like animals." Inmates issued 10 demands including "fully cooked food", "unrestricted access to complaint and grievance forms", "an adequate standard of living", and "adequate medical care".

Red Onion officials stated that the hunger strike ended within a week. Supporters of the strikers challenged these reports and contended that the prison has taken pains to isolate and silence strike leaders in order to discourage communication with the outside world.

=== Self-immolations ===
On May 25, 2022, DeAndre Gordon self-immolated in order to be transferred to a different prison due to racism and other abuses he suffered. He sustained 3rd degree burns to his leg.

On September 15, 2024, Ekong Eshiet and Trayvon Brown, two black inmates at Red Onion State Prison, set themselves on fire while in solitary confinement to demand an end to the unbearable isolation, racism, and brutality. Both survived. According to Eshiet's mother in an interview after the incident, "Officers have withheld [Eshiet's] medication, spit in his food, taken his lifeline to the outside world, his tablet, violated his Quran, and used racial slurs," Ekong, himself, appeared on a PrisonRadio show where he revealed his reasons why he self-immolated.

Two other men, Demetrius Wallace and Charles Coleman, stated they burned themselves in 2024. The former wrote, "Lastly on August (sic "Aug") 23, 2024 while being housed in solitary confinement being arrested and threatened by several prison officials, being denied showers and given trays with no food on them... I set the top of my foot on fire in desperation to get off the compound and have something done about what I was going through. This caused me to receive third-degree burns and undergo two surgeries and receive a skin graft."

==== Department of Corrections denial ====
After news reports of six inmates self-immolating, on November 27, 2024, the director of the Virginia Department of Corrections issued a statement claiming that the reports were "nothing more than bad-faith efforts to try to score cheap political points by advocacy groups". They then denied that any inmates self-immolated at all, saying "To be clear, these inmates did not set themselves on fire or self-immolate, as some reports have ludicrously suggested." The department then affirmed that all prisoners who were burned during the alleged incidents had received proper care, saying, "Some of the inmates were treated for burns at the Department's secure medical facility at the VCU Medical Center and cleared to return to the facility, while others did not require outside medical treatment." The department also stated that, despite their assertion that the inmates did not self-immolate, that "All six inmates have been referred to mental health staff for treatment" and "several of these inmates have a history of engaging in self-harm."

== Notable inmates ==
=== Current ===
Inmate Name	Register Number	Status	Details
Jesse Leroy Matthew Jr.	1667409	Serving multiple life sentences for numerous crimes.	Originally arrested as a suspect in the 2014 Murder of Hannah Graham. His arrest then led to him also being a suspect in the 2009 Murder of Morgan Dana Harrington, and sexual assault allegations. He was then sentenced for a sexual assault in 2005, and for the murders of both Hannah and Morgan.
Joaquin Rams	1487190	Serving a life sentence.	Murdered his own 15-month-old son.
Christopher Darnell Jones Jr.	Unknown	5 life sentences + 23 years.	Killer of 3 University of Virginia football players in a 2022 mass shooting at the University

=== Former ===
- Jorge Avila-Torrez (born 1988), serial killer
- Robert C. Gleason (1970–2013), serial killer; murdered two inmates; was transferred to Greensville Correctional Center
- Lee Boyd Malvo - One of the two 2002 D.C. Snipers who killed 17 people, he was transferred from Red Onion State Prison to Keen Mountain Correctional Center in 2024.
- Randall Via – Inmate featured in the HBO documentary Solitary: Inside Red Onion State Prison; later transferred to Buckingham Correctional Center. He is the host of the prison podcast "Red Onion Randy".

== See also ==
- Solitary: Inside Red Onion State Prison, HBO documentary film
