= Horman =

Horman is a surname. Notable people with the surname include:

- Arthur T. Horman (1905 – 1964), American screenwriter
- Charles Horman (1942–1973), journalist
- Kyron Horman (born 2002), American missing person
- William Horman (c. 1440–1535), headmaster

== See also ==
- Disappearance of Kyron Horman
- John Horman Trophy
- Sherry Hormann (born 1960), film director
