= Kara Robinson Chamberlain =

American victim's advocate and true crime influencer

- Born: Kara Robinson; 1986 or 1987 (age 39–40); Columbia, South Carolina
- Occupations: True crime influencer, victim's advocate

Kara Robinson Chamberlain (born 1986 or 1987) is an American true crime influencer, victim's advocate, and former police department employee. She first gained national attention upon being abducted by Richard Evonitz in 2002 at the age of 15 and escaping 18 hours later. Information she learned about him during her abduction was key to the police subsequently finding him. She subsequently became a police department employee, a victim's advocate, and a true crime influencer on social media. As of 2026, she hosts a Freeform true crime documentary series titled Somebody Knows Something. She is the subject of two documentaries.

== Biography ==
Robinson was born in 1986 or 1987 and grew up in Columbia, South Carolina. On June 24, 2002, she was watering plants outside a friend's house when Richard Evonitz arrived in a car, claiming to offer pamphlets. After she told him that she didn't live there and that her friend's parents weren't home, he approached, pressed a gun to her neck, and forced her into a storage bin in the trunk of his car. As he began driving, she began memorizing details, including how many turns he took, what brand of cigarettes he smoked, and the serial number of the storage bin she was inside. She has since stated, in reflection, "My survival mechanism said 'All right, let's gather as much information as we can. Fear barely kicked in.' " On the way to his apartment, he handcuffed and gagged her.

For 18 hours, he assaulted her at his apartment. However, she continued gathering information, such as the name of his doctor and dentist from fridge magnets. She also tried to keep him calm, such as by volunteering to sweep the kitchen floor. Around dawn, she was able to free a hand from her handcuffs, and removed her leg restraints. She then escaped, asking a car to take her to the police station. She then took the police back to his apartment, but he had fled. However, the police found clippings of the murders of three girls in his apartment. He was later caught by the police and shot himself.

For the remainder of her high school and college, she worked for the DNA lab and victim's services at her county sheriff's office, and went on to attend the police academy, where she was the only woman in her class. She became a school resource officer, and also worked in victim's services and as an investigator in assault and abuse cases. She left law enforcement to become a stay-at-home mom.

She went on to, after participating in Lifetime's special Smart Justice: The Jayme Closs Case in 2019, become a motivational speaker, and started an account on TikTok, where she soon went viral with a video about her instructor at the police academy teaching about her case. Her videos at first focused on coping with PTSD and trauma. By September 2020, she had more than 150,000 followers. She has also shared tips on how to escape if you're restrained. She co-hosted a podcast called The Survivor's Guide to True Crime with Kimberly Corban. She has been called on to TV to discuss topics including the disappearance of Nancy Guthrie.

In 2026, she was announced as the host of a Freeform true crime documentary series, Somebody Knows Something, about her investigating unsolved crimes. The series also streamed on Hulu, where it premiered on August 10, 2026. Cases discussed include the disappearance of Steven Koecher, the shooting of Liz Barraza, the disappearance of Kyron Horman, and the disappearance of Amy Wroe Bechtel. She has stated all the stories selected have a high chance to be solved and have new information being investigated. That same year, she also co-starred in true crime three-part series The Serial Killer Connection with Bonnie Lou, Evonitz's ex-wife, focused on investigating Evonitz and, in her words, "find[ing] other cases that he's tied to".

She is the subject of two documentaries: Escaping Captivity: The Kara Robinson Story (2021) by MarWar Junction on Oxygen, and Lifetime's The Girl Who Escaped: The Kara Robinson Story (2023) where Katie Douglas starred as Robinson. Both were executive produced by Elizabeth Smart.
