= Killing of Missy Bevers =

Murdered American fitness instructor

Missy Bevers
- Born: Terri Leann Strickland; August 9, 1970; Graham, Texas, U.S.
- Died: April 18, 2016 (aged 45); Midlothian, Texas, U.S.
- Cause of death: Murder
- Resting place: Shiloh Cemetery; Ovilla, Texas, U.S.
- Spouse: Brandon Bevers (m. 1998)
- Children: 3
- Relatives: Randy Bevers (father-in-law)

On April 18, 2016, the body of Terri Leann "Missy" Bevers (née Strickland) was found at Creekside Church of Christ in Midlothian, Texas. Bevers' murder garnered media attention after Midlothian police released surveillance footage from inside the church, which shows an unknown person dressed in armor and a SWAT uniform walking around the church's hallways while occasionally breaking glass and opening doors. The case remains unsolved despite tips and theories.

== Background ==
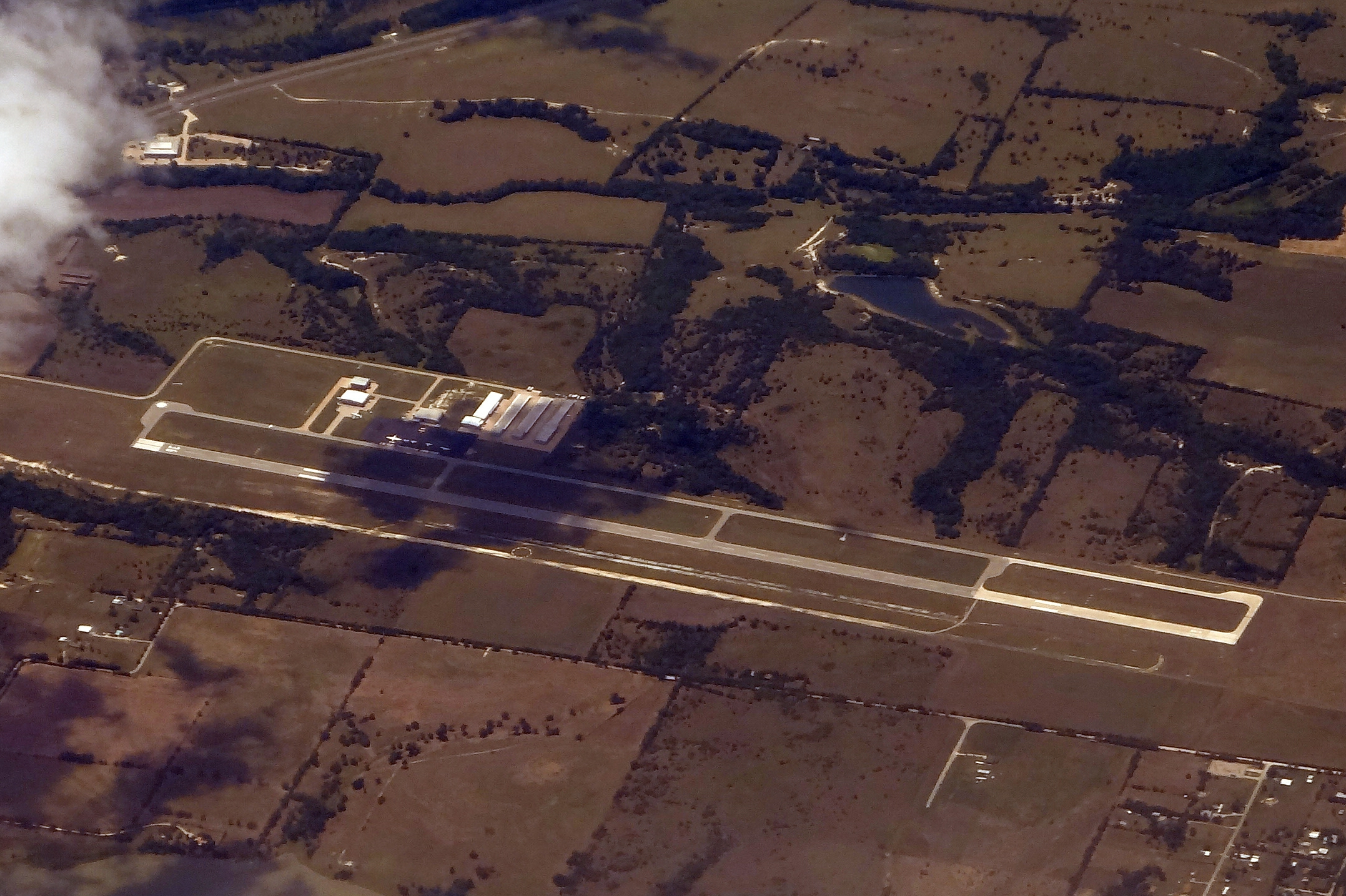
Creekside Church (top left), southwest of Mid-Way Regional Airport (center)

Terri "Missy" Bevers was born on August 9, 1970, in Graham, Texas. She married Brandon Bevers in 1998, She was the mother of three daughters, and the family resided in Red Oak. Bevers worked as a fitness instructor, holding Camp Gladiator bootcamps at Midlothian's Creekside Church of Christ. The night before her death, Bevers informed her students that the fitness class would be held inside the church due to the unfavorable weather, as opposed to the typical site at the church's parking lot.

== Killing ==
Bevers was last seen on surveillance footage entering the church at 4:18 a.m while preparing for her upcoming fitness class that was set to start at 5 a.m. Bevers was in the midst of transporting her exercise gear from her truck to the church. Shortly after 5 a.m., a student of Bevers' fitness class entered the church and saw Bevers' body. Emergency services were called and the crime scene investigated. Bevers was pronounced dead shortly after the police arrived. Bevers was found dead with several puncture wounds to the head and chest. A police warrant alleged that these wounds were "consistent with tools the suspect was carrying throughout the building." A hammer was found alongside other tools near Bevers' body.

Initially, police considered burglary as a possible motive for the break-in. However, they were unable to find anything missing inside the church, and the killer left behind several items belonging to Bevers, among them her purse and iPad. At one point, police believed Bevers was not only targeted, but that the suspect planned to make the crime appear as if it was a burglary gone wrong, according to unnamed sources. One of the warrants filed by police claimed that the suspect possessed a smartphone. Police also believe that Bevers might have conversed with her murderer preceding the crime.

Investigators first believed the suspect to be a male. However, police later changed their position, stating that although the suspect's gait appears to be feminine, the suspect's sex is not known for sure. The suspect wore what appeared to be SWAT police outfit and tactical gear from head to toe, including a "POLICE"-marked vest, a black helmet, and a black pair of gloves. Bevers' relatives were questioned during the investigation. The alibis of Bever's husband and her father-in-law were questioned and confirmed by police. Suspicions were roused when a published search warrant reported her father in law, four days after the murder, bringing to a dry cleaner a bloodied shirt. He later explained the blood as dog blood spilled by two dogs fighting. Midlothian police performed a forensic analysis on the shirt, confirming the absence of human blood and the presence of dog blood.

Investigators also made note of the suspect's distinct walking gait. The suspect in the surveillance footage appears to walk slowly, sometimes steadying themselves with the wall while having trouble moving their right foot or leg. Midlothian police have stated that this distinct gait may have been due to a temporary condition. In 2021, the FBI asked Dr. Michael Nirenberg, a forensic podiatrist, to study the suspect's gait. Nirenberg stated that the person's gait is affected by the weight of the gear and weapons, and that there is no relationship between gait and gender. He concluded that the suspect's gender cannot be determined solely from their gait.

As of 2026, police do not believe the investigation to be cold. Law enforcement indicated there are unnamed persons of interest in the investigation.

=== Surveillance footage ===
Police checked the church's surveillance camera system early on during the investigation. Although cameras outside the church were not functioning on the day of the murder, cameras inside the church were functional and surveillance footage was recovered. Surveillance footage taken at around 4 a.m. appears to show the suspect of an unknown sex and identity walking in the church's hallways while occasionally smashing glass and attempting to open doors lining the church hallways. Surveillance footage reportedly shows Bevers walking down the church hallways before her murder, although this specific footage has not been released to the public by the Midlothian police. The Midlothian police have also not revealed where Bevers and the suspect crossed paths. It is believed that the suspect murdered Bevers in a violent encounter inside the church.

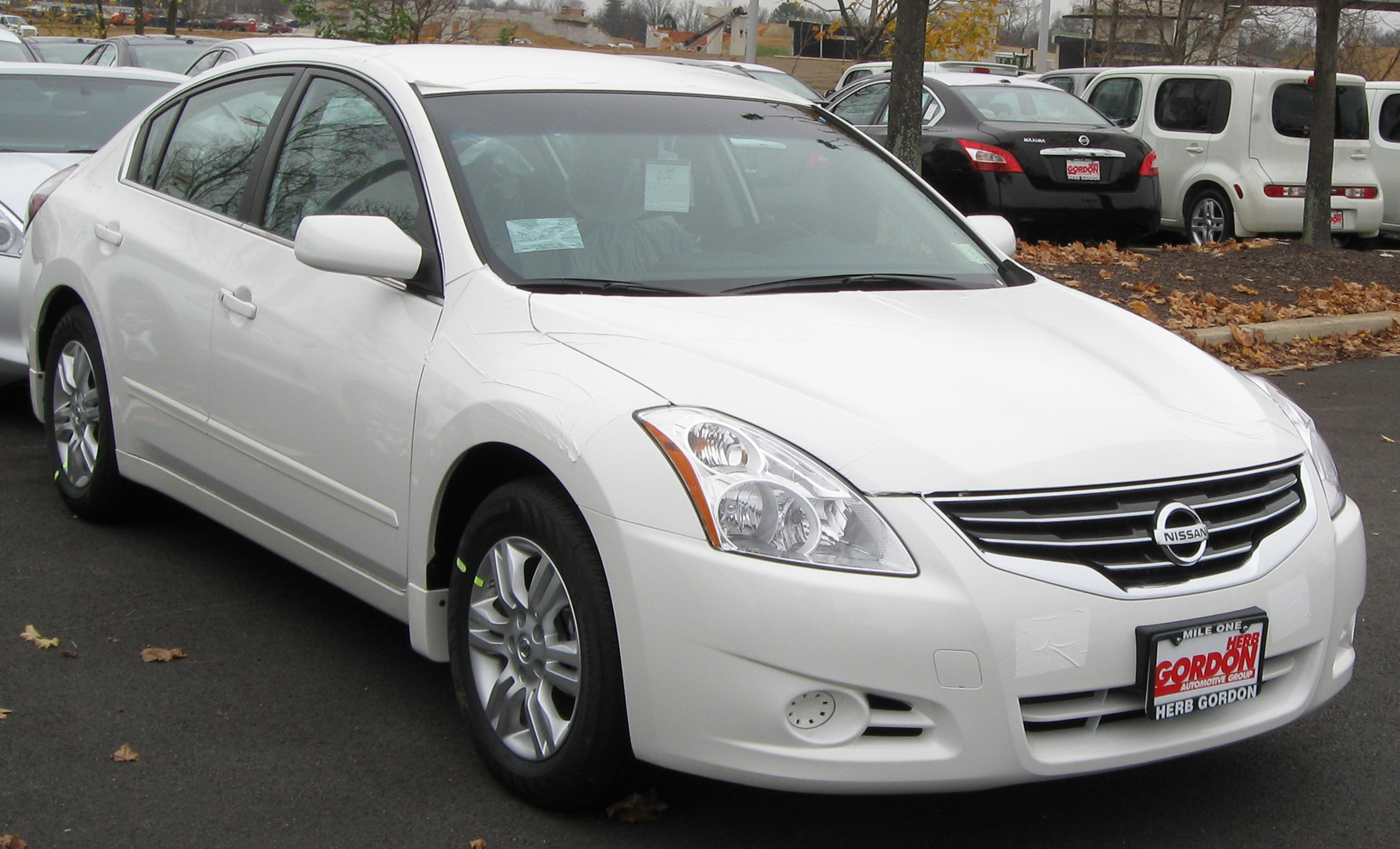
2010 Nissan Altima 2.5S sedan, similar to the unidentified one recorded driving suspiciously in the parking lot a few hours before the killing

In May 2016, Midlothian Police released a still image of what is believed to be a 2010–2012 Nissan Altima driving around early morning in the parking lot of SWFA Outdoors, a sports goods store located close to Creekside Church. The car, which police believe has an oval bumper sticker, pulled into the SWFA Outdoors parking lot at around 2 a.m. before leaving just a few minutes later. Police believe they could help the investigation. Later, in December 2016, SWFA Outdoors released the full surveillance footage from the parking lot. The video shows the vehicle of interest entering the parking lot the same early morning as the murder. The driver circles the store's parking lot, flashes the vehicle's headlights randomly, and parks in a secluded area for a few minutes before exiting the parking lot onto U.S. Route 287. As of June 2023, police have not identified the driver, and have also not definitively concluded whether or not this vehicle is related to Bevers' killing.

== Reward and tips ==
Initially, a reward was set at $10,000 before doubling to $20,000 and rising to $50,000. As of 2021, there is a reward of $150,000 for information potentially helpful in capturing the suspect.

According to Midlothian police, tips are received about the case on a daily basis. As of 2022, a podcast called True Crime Broads discusses the case, and was first launched with the intention of keeping people talking about the case. The podcast creators also maintain a billboard advertising the $150,000 reward for any information that could help solve the murder.

== See also ==
- List of unsolved murders (2000–present)
- Shooting of Liz Barraza – Unsolved shooting in Tomball, Texas, US. Another unsolved case in similar circumstances.
