= Richard Evonitz =

American serial killer, kidnapper, and rapist (1963–2002)

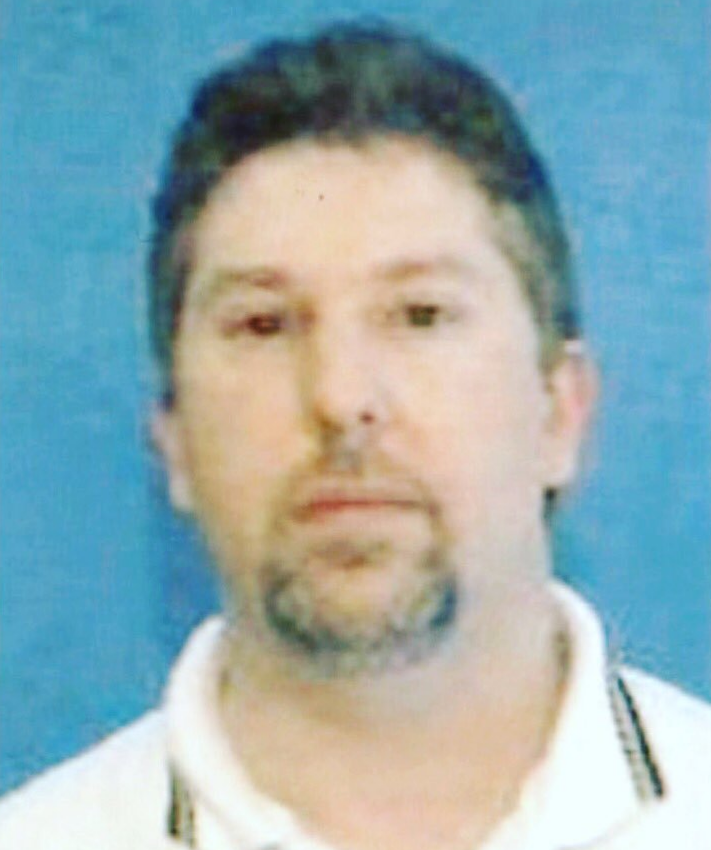
- Driver's license photo distributed by the Federal Bureau of Investigation
- Born: Richard Marc Edward Evonitz; July 29, 1963; Columbia, South Carolina, U.S.
- Died: June 27, 2002 (aged 38); Sarasota, Florida, U.S.
- Cause of death: Suicide by gunshot
- Occupations: Manager of Jiffy Lube; Sonar technician in United States Navy; Salesman; Air compressor company employee
- Spouse(s): Bonnie Lou Gower (1988–1996); Hope Marie Crowley (1999–2002)
- Conviction: Lewd exposure (1987)
- Penalty: Two years of probation

Details
- Victims: 3+
- Span of crimes: 1987–2002
- Country: United States
- States: Virginia South Carolina; Others possible

Richard Marc Edward Evonitz (July 29, 1963 – June 27, 2002) was an American serial killer, kidnapper, and rapist responsible for the murders of at least three teenage girls in Spotsylvania County, Virginia, and the abduction of Kara Robinson in Lexington County, South Carolina. He has been suspected in other murders and confessed additional crimes to his sister shortly before his suicide.

== Early life and career ==
Richard Marc Edward Evonitz was born on July 29, 1963, at Providence Hospital in Columbia, South Carolina, to Joseph and Tess Evonitz. The eldest of three siblings, he had two sisters: Kristen, born in July 1968, and Jennifer, born in March 1971. The family was dysfunctional. His parents separated when he was a baby and again when he was 12. They divorced in 1985. His father was an alcoholic who often passed out after drinking. He frequently belittled the family, calling them "morons" and "peons", and drowned Evonitz's dog in front of him. When Evonitz was 6, Joseph attempted to drown him. Later, his wives said he experienced nightmares about his father.

After graduating from Irmo High School in 1980, Evonitz worked briefly as a Jiffy Lube manager, before joining the United States Navy. He served as a sonar technician and received a Good Conduct Medal before being honorably discharged after eight years. After leaving the Navy, Evonitz worked at businesses that sold compressors and grinding equipment. He filed for bankruptcy in 1997 after a divorce. His house was foreclosed in 1999 following a failed business venture. At the time of his death, Evonitz had been working at an air-compressor company since moving to South Carolina a few years earlier.

== Criminal history ==
=== Assaults ===
On January 3, 1987, Evonitz pulled up beside 15‑year‑old Kelli Ballard in Jacksonville, Florida, and exposed himself and masturbated while she walked her 3-year-old sister down the street. The next day, he was seen following Ballard and her mother in a mall parking lot. They took down his license plate and alerted police. He was arrested a month later when his ship returned to port. He entered a plea of no contest and received three years' probation. He told police he "had a problem masturbating in front of girls." Evonitz was also suspected in a 1994 abduction and a 1995 rape in Spotsylvania, Virginia.

=== Murder of Sarah Cherry ===
Sarah Margaret Cherry

On July 6, 1988, 12-year-old Sarah Margaret Cherry was abducted while babysitting at a home in rural Bowdoin, Maine. Several days later, her body was found hidden in a wooded area. She had been bound with rope, sexually assaulted with birch sticks, stabbed, and strangled with a scarf. On March 18, 1989, Dennis Dechaine was convicted of the murder. He has filed multiple appeals, maintaining that he is innocent, and the circumstances of his conviction remain disputed.

Evonitz served as a sonar technician aboard USS Koelsch, which was based in Portland, Maine, from May 8, 1988, to May 31, 1989, while the ship was undergoing a refit at Bath Iron Works. Deirdre Enright, founder of the University of Virginia Law School's Innocence Project, has linked Evonitz to Cherry's murder due to similarities with his modus operandi. He had access to a white Toyota Corolla similar to a vehicle seen near where Cherry's body was found, and he was known to visit Brunswick Naval Air Station commissary, thirteen miles (21 km) south of Bowdoin. DNA recovered from Cherry's body was deemed insufficient for comparison to Evonitz's profile. Dechaine remains incarcerated at Maine State Prison in Warren, Maine.

=== Route 29 stalker ===
Alicia Showalter Reynolds

At 7:30 a.m. on March 2, 1996, 25-year-old Alicia Showalter Reynolds left her home in Baltimore, Maryland, to drive to Charlottesville, Virginia. At 6 p.m., her car was found abandoned along a highway near Culpeper, Virginia. Witnesses later reported seeing her on Route 29 speaking to a man with a blue pickup truck. Her body was found in a wooded area fifteen miles (24 km) southeast of where she had gone missing on May 7, 1996. After her disappearance, about twenty women reported that a man in a pickup truck had tried to get them to pull over while driving on Route 29 in early 1996. During the same period, a Virginia State Police trooper encountered the man believed to be the Route 29 stalker three times on highways in northern and central Virginia.

Anne Carolyn McDaniel

On September 22, 1996, the burned remains of 20-year-old Anne Carolyn McDaniel were found by sportsmen exercising their dogs ten miles (16 km) from where Reynolds's body was found. McDaniel, who had cerebral palsy, was last seen leaving a group home in Orange on September 18, 1996, attempting to hitchhike along Route 29.

=== Silva and Lisk murders ===
Sofia Marlene Silva

On September 9, 1996, Evonitz abducted 16-year-old Sofia Marlene Silva from her home in Spotsylvania County, Virginia, after she returned from school near Loriella Park. She was last seen doing her homework on her front steps. Her decomposed body was found a month later in Birchwood Creek in King George County. She was wrapped in a white cover and her pubic hair had been shaved off.

Kathryn and Kristin Lisk

On May 1, 1997, Evonitz abducted sisters Kristin Michelle Lisk, 15, and Kathryn Nicole Lisk, 12, from their front lawn on Block House Road in Spotsylvania County. They were last seen getting off their school buses. Their father returned home to find no sign of them except Kristin’s book bag in the yard. After sexually assaulting them, Evonitz strangled the sisters and dumped their bodies in the South Anna River. Their bodies were found five days later.

=== Abduction of Kara Robinson ===
On June 24, 2002, Evonitz abducted 15-year-old Kara Robinson from a friend's yard in Lexington, South Carolina. He approached her pretending to offer "pamphlets." After she said her friend's parents were not home, he held a gun to her neck and forced her into a plastic bin with a gag in her mouth. He took her to his apartment, raped her, forced her to take Valium, and tied her to his bed. After watching news coverage about her abduction, he tied her to a homemade wooden apparatus to spread her legs. While Evonitz slept, Robinson freed herself, escaped, and identified him to police using information she found on his refrigerator. She went outside and found two men in a car who took her to the sheriff's office.

Police determined that fibers from the furry handcuffs on Robinson were also found on the bodies of Silva and the Lisk sisters. Kristin Lisk's handprint was lifted from inside Evonitz's car trunk. In his apartment, police found nude photos of young girls, hundreds of pornographic images and videotapes of children on his computer, including one showing him molesting a young girl and another showing him masturbating to Polaroid photos of other children. They also found a large amount of girls' underwear to which he had done various acts that have not been linked to any specific individual.

=== Capture and suicide ===
On June 27, 2002, Evonitz called his sister Jennifer and admitted to having committed "more crimes than he can remember." He told her to meet him at an IHOP in Jacksonville, Florida, but she contacted police. Later that day, he was surrounded by police on Bayfront Drive in Sarasota, Florida. He was urged to surrender, but after a police dog was released, Evonitz shot himself in the head with his .25 caliber handgun.

== Media ==
Evonitz's case was featured in an episode of Deadly Sins titled "Insatiable". On February 11, 2023, Lifetime released a television film titled The Girl Who Escaped: The Kara Robinson Story. The film starred Katie Douglas as Kara Robinson, Cara Buono as Debra Robinson, and Kristian Bruun as Richard Evonitz. Elizabeth Smart served as an executive producer. YouTube personalities Anthony Padilla and Kris Collins also interviewed Robinson.

== See also ==
- List of serial killers in the United States
