= John Paul Jones Arena =

University of Virginia basketball court

- "Tony Bennett Court"
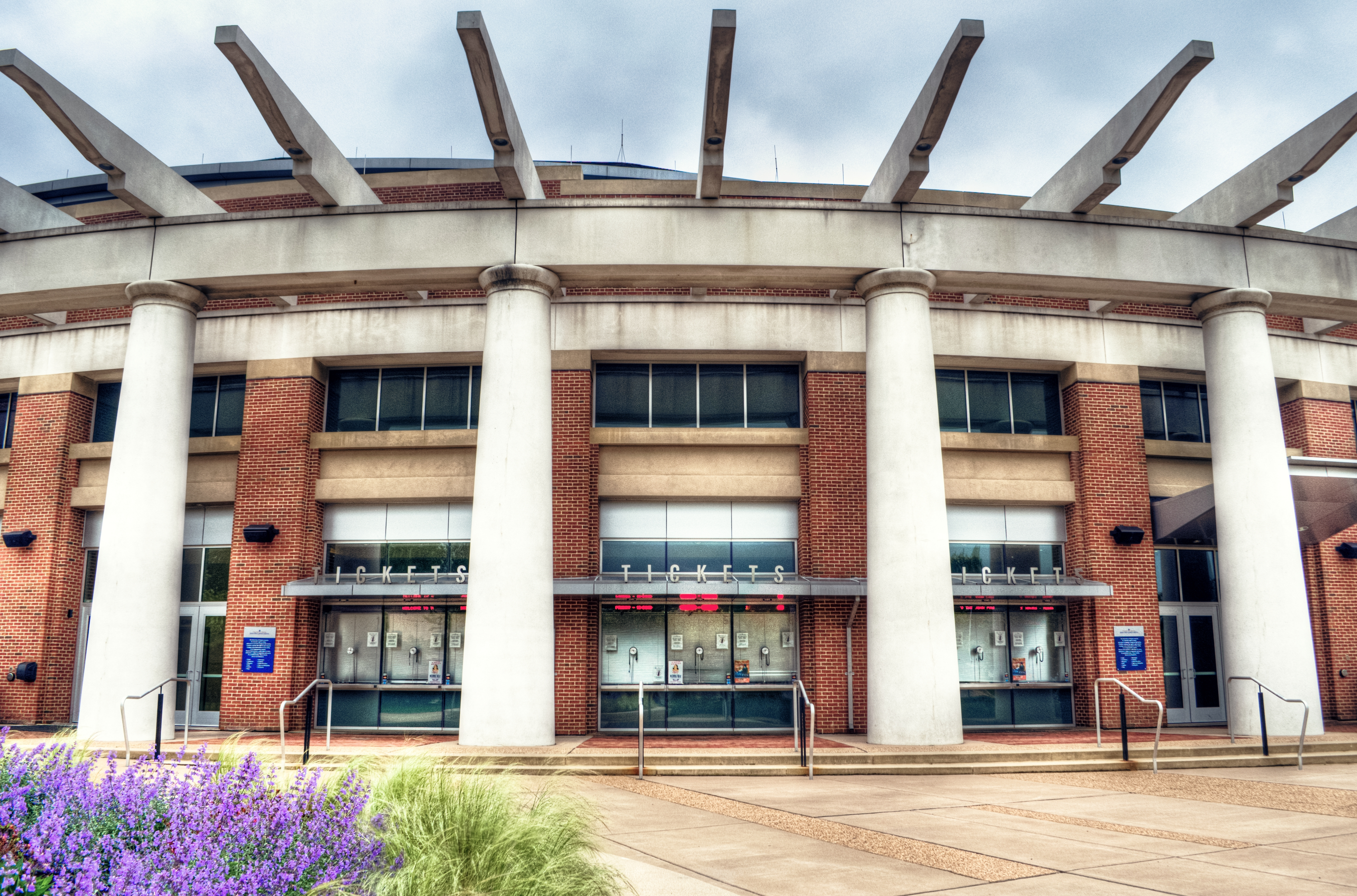
- Interactive map of John Paul Jones Arena
- Location: 295 Massie Road; Charlottesville, Virginia 22903
- Coordinates: 38.0460°N 78.5068°W
- Owner: University of Virginia
- Operator: ASM Global
- Capacity: Basketball: 14,623; Concerts: *End stage 180°: 12,467; *End stage 270°: 14,075; *End stage 360°: 15,177; *Center stage: 15,405; *Theatre: 7,352
- Record attendance: 15,219 (11/12/06 vs. Arizona)

Construction
- Groundbreaking: May 30, 2003
- Opened: August 1, 2006
- Cost: $131 million ($229 million in 2025 dollars)
- Architect: VMDO Architects
- Structural engineer: Ellerbe Becket
- General contractor: Barton Malow

Tenants
- Virginia Cavaliers (Men's & Women's Basketball)

John Paul Jones Arena, or JPJ, is a multi-purpose arena owned by the University of Virginia in Charlottesville, Virginia. Since November 2006, it serves as the home to the Virginia Cavaliers men's and women's basketball teams, as well as for concerts and other events. With seating for 14,623 fans (nearly twice the capacity of its predecessor, University Hall) John Paul Jones Arena is the largest indoor arena in Virginia and the biggest Atlantic Coast Conference basketball arena located outside of large metropolitan areas. (Note: The Carrier Dome is in the Syracuse metropolitan area of 700,000; the Yum! Center is in the Louisville metropolitan area of 1,300,000; and the Dean Smith Center and PNC Arena are in the Research Triangle metro area of 2,000,000. JPJ is in the Charlottesville metropolitan area of just 200,000.) Sports Illustrated named John Paul Jones Arena the best new college basketball arena of the 2000s.

Virginia fans in the arena are known for cheering loudly for defensive stands and for providing what Rick Pitino, who went winless in three attempts at JPJ, called "one of the best home court advantages [he's] ever seen" where UVA fans seem that they are "on top of you." JPJ opened for basketball on November 12, 2006, as Virginia defeated No. 10 ranked Arizona, 93–90, and handed Lute Olson a season-opening loss in his final season.

On February 21, 2026, the playing surface at John Paul Jones Arena was renamed to "Tony Bennett Court", ahead of #14 Virginia's matchup with Miami, in honor of the retired men's head coach who led the Hoos to the national championship in 2019.

Virginia men's basketball is 257–63 (.803) at John Paul Jones Arena as of March 2025.

== History ==
The design features Roman pergolas on the outside as well as the inside, a modern take on the university's Greek-inspired Jeffersonian architecture.

Paul Tudor Jones, who earned a B.A. in Economics from UVA in 1976, donated $35 million of his personal funds for the construction of the arena. Granted naming rights in exchange for the donation, he opted to name the arena in honor of his father, John Paul Jones, a 1948 graduate of the University of Virginia School of Law. The arena is sometimes incorrectly assumed to be named for either John Paul Jones, the founder of the United States Navy, or John Paul Jones, the bassist for the English rock band Led Zeppelin.

The arena plays host to not only basketball games, but a wide variety of concerts, performances and other events; for example, its opening season in 2006 included events such as the Charlottesville-originated Dave Matthews Band, as well as Cirque du Soleil, Larry the Cable Guy, The Wiggles, Disney on Ice & WWE Monday Night Raw.

The arena also houses office space for SMG staff, the UVa athletics media relations department, video services and dining services. It also features coaches' offices, practice facilities and an extensive sports medicine facility for men's and women's basketball teams.

The arena's first event was Cirque du Soleil's Delirium on Tuesday, August 1, 2006, but the official Grand Opening event was a two-night tour-ending stand by Charlottesville natives Dave Matthews Band, September 22–23, 2006. An "open house" event for the local community was conducted on July 22, 2006.

In February 2007, the arena was awarded the title of "Best New Major Concert Venue" at Pollstar's 18th Annual Concert Industry Awards.

== Basketball ==
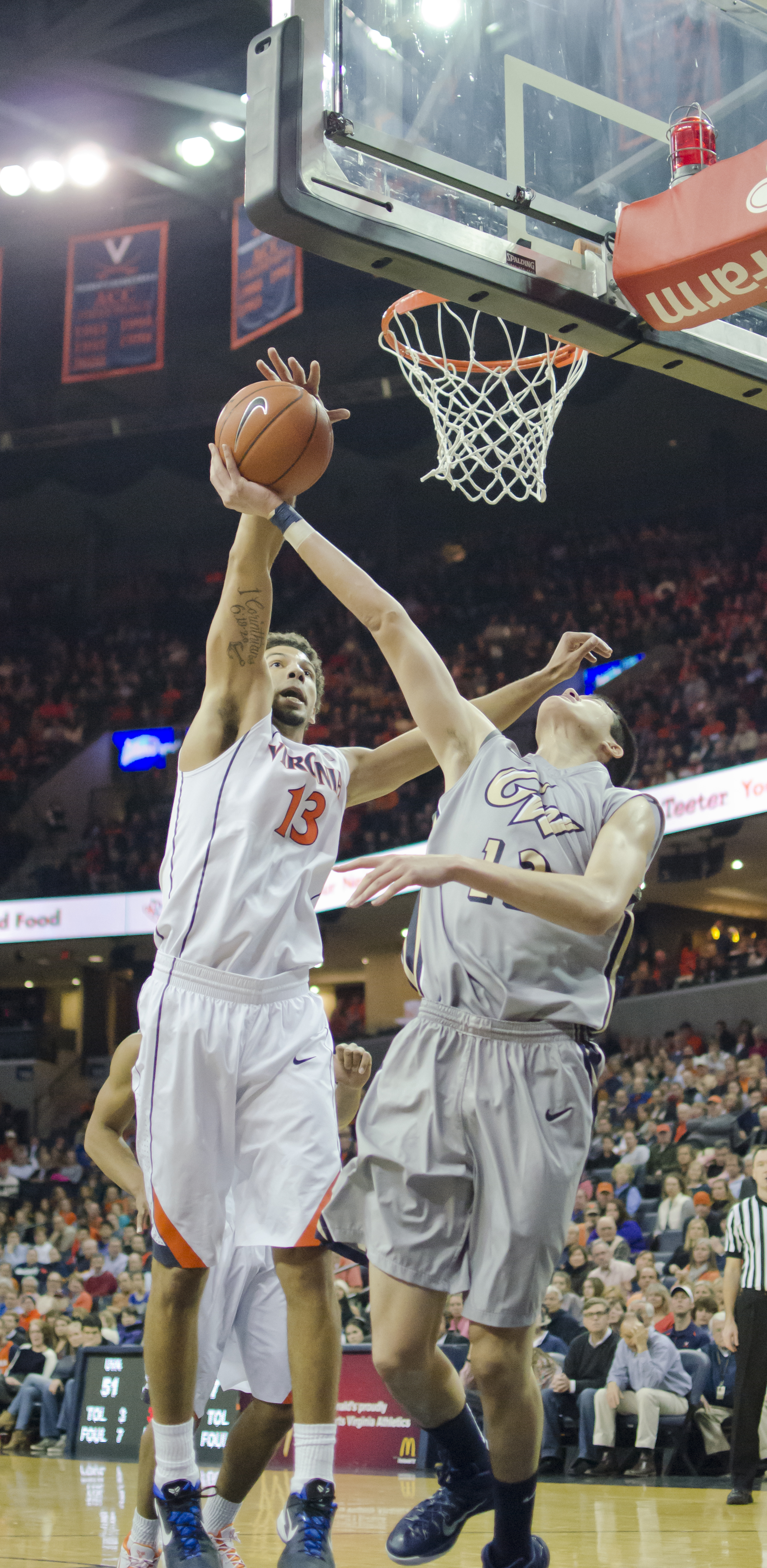
Anthony Gill blocking a shot in 2014, with JPJ interior as backdrop

The University of Virginia opened the John Paul Jones Arena on November 12, 2006, with a pair of victories. The Virginia women's basketball team defeated Old Dominion University 92–72 in the afternoon. Later that evening in front of a capacity crowd of 15,219, the Virginia men's basketball team defeated No. 10 ranked Arizona 93–90, rallying from a 19-point first-half deficit. Both games included elaborate pre-game festivities that featured a fireworks display and the Cavalier mascot rappelling from the rafters. Michael Buffer was introduced to announce the Virginia starting lineup prior to the men's game.

On March 1, 2007, the men's basketball team defeated Virginia Tech 69–56, clinching a share of first place in the final ACC regular season standings for the 2006–2007 season. The victory marked the school-record 16th home win of the season, and the Cavaliers finished 16–1 for the season in their new arena. Furthermore, Virginia went an undefeated 8–0 in league games at home for the first time since the Hoos went 7–0 at home in 1982. Also at this game, the fans in attendance said goodbye to two fourth-year players, J. R. Reynolds and Jason Cain, both of whom had contributed to the Virginia basketball program.

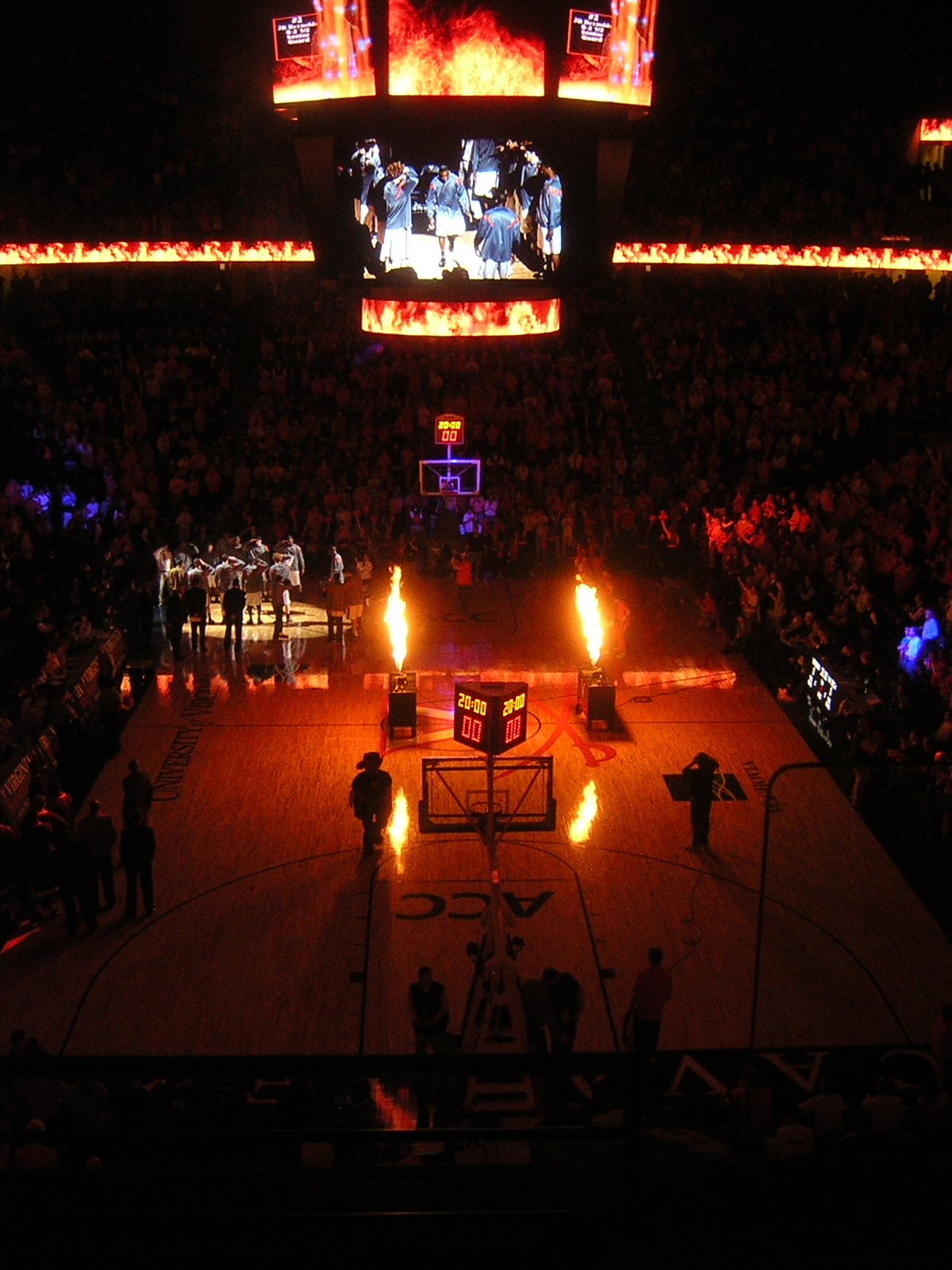
JPJ has a fire display when announcing the UVA starters

On February 28, 2013, Virginia upset No. 3 Duke which led to thousands of fans rushing the court. The 2012–2013 Cavaliers set a school record with 18 regular season home wins, finishing with a home record of 18–1.

On March 1, 2014, No. 12 Virginia dominated No. 4 Syracuse 75–56 at JPJ to win the ACC regular season title outright. The same day, the Virginia student section, the "Hoo Crew," won the 2014 Naismith Student Section of the Year award. It was the final home game for future NBA players Joe Harris and Akil Mitchell, as well as former walk-on player Thomas Rogers; Rogers' three-point field goal at the end of the game, and the subsequent reaction by the crowd and team, were particularly noted by media and the Cavalier fanbase.

On December 21, 2014, Virginia tied an NCAA record in JPJ by allowing the NCAA-bound Harvard just one field goal in the first half; Virginia went on to win 76–27.

== Home-court advantage ==
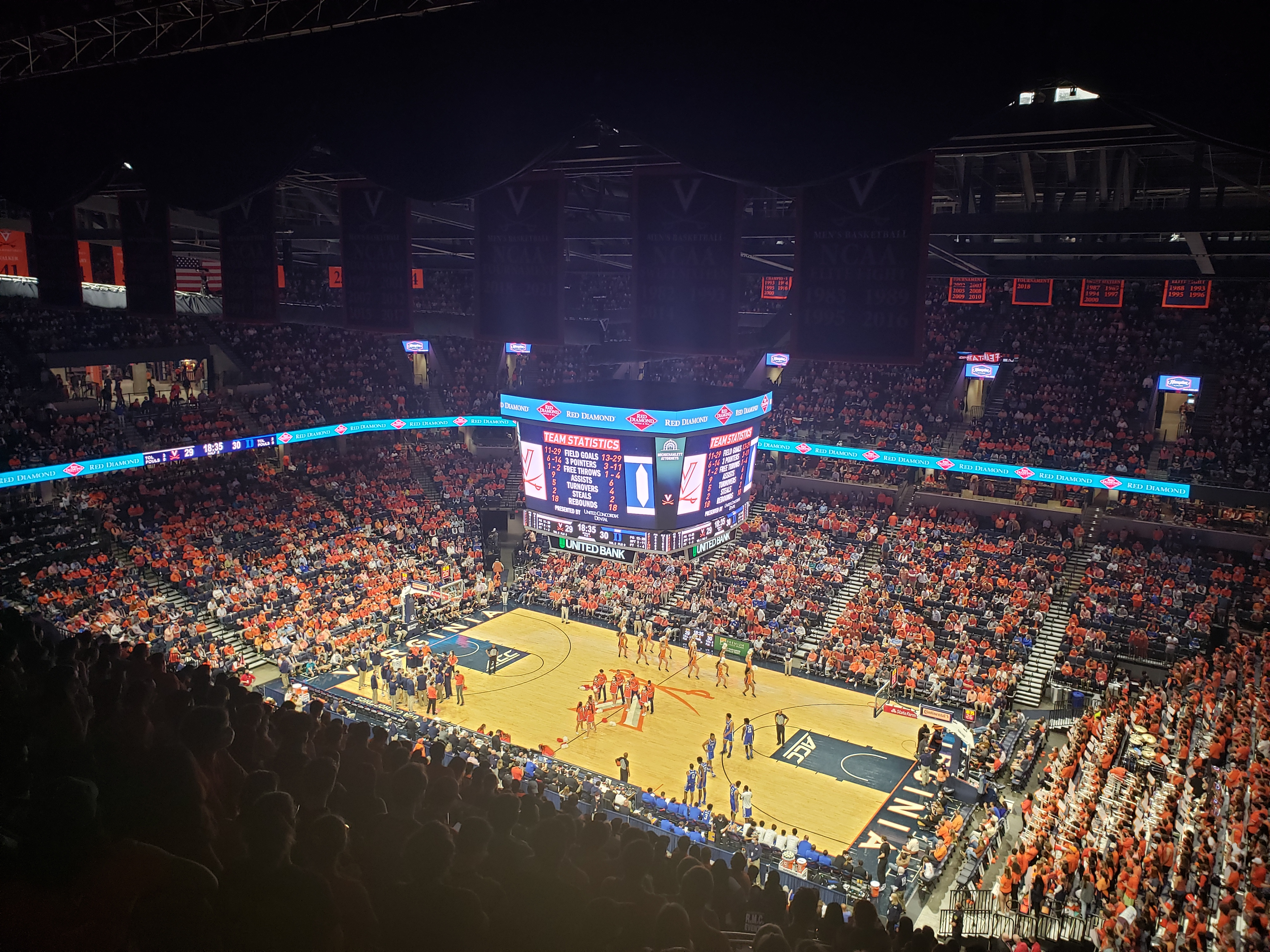
UVA playing host to Duke at JPJ in February 2022.

JPJ is known as harboring one of the best basketball home-court advantages and crowd noise in the Atlantic Coast Conference and nationwide. Hall of Fame coach Rick Pitino of Louisville (and Kentucky) said on the eve of his first game at JPJ in 2015 that he'd heard Virginia has "one of the best arenas in the ACC" and he was "looking forward to seeing it." After his first visit, a five-point victory for No. 3 Virginia against No. 9 Louisville, Pitino lamented that at JPJ the UVA crowd is "on top of you." Pitino would later add to his praise, "[At UVA] they all stand up with 10 seconds to go [on the shot clock], cheering their team on defensively. I have not seen that in my 40 years of college basketball." ESPN ranked John Paul Jones Arena as the second toughest arena in which to play in the ACC.

=== 76–27 ===
On two occasions at JPJ, Virginia men's and women's basketball teams defeated strong competition by exact scores of 76–27, margins of 49 points and near-triplings of their opponent's scoring. On December 20, 2014, No. 6 ranked UVA defeated an NCAA Tournament bound Harvard team 76–27. Harvard, coached by Tommy Amaker, had been ranked in the AP Top 25 just one month prior. Two years later on January 26, 2017, the unranked UVA women's team upset No. 19 Virginia Tech, coached by Kenny Brooks, by an identical score of 76–27. In both cases, the Cavaliers' defensive style forced their highly rated opponents to take many outside shots, of which they made very few. Harvard (7–1) shot 16% — 8 for 50 – on field goals and 18% on three-point field goals. The No. 19 Hokies (16–3) made 18% of field goals and shot 7% — 2 for 29 – on three-point field goal attempts.

== Other events ==
John Paul Jones Arena is the unofficial home venue for the Dave Matthews Band, which was founded in Charlottesville in 1991. The band has played the arena thirteen times, including the arena's grand opening and the band's 25th anniversary show. The venue has been site of many memorable moments for the band, such as a fan in a trench coat mysteriously walking the stage in 2006, and the final show before the band's first ever break from touring in 2010. In 2023, a banner was added commemorating the band’s venue record of 13 performances.

On August 14, 2006, WWE presented Monday Night Raw at the arena. This was the first time WWE had presented in Charlottesville, Virginia. Before John Paul Jones Arena was built, Charlottesville was not equipped to handle the masses of WWE fans.

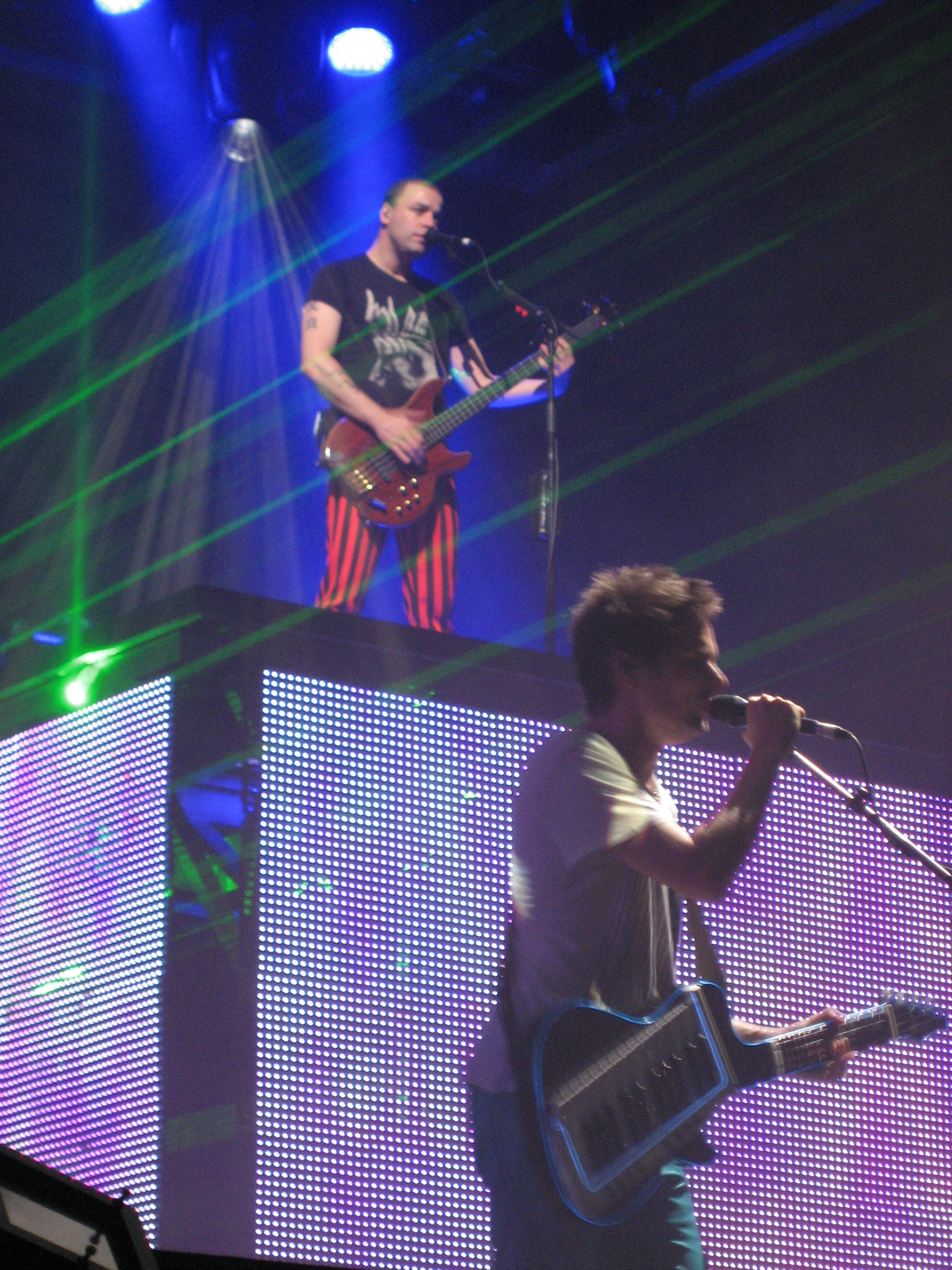
British rock band Muse playing at JPJ in October 2010

On October 25, 2008, Jay-Z played a concert at the arena, making him the first hip-hop act to play there.

On October 17, 2009, Metallica played their "World Magnetic" tour at the arena, supported by Lamb of God and Gojira. The arena became the site of the disappearance of 20-year-old Virginia Tech student Morgan Dana Harrington from the concert. She mysteriously left the arena in search of a restroom, despite 18 female restrooms being provided inside the secured arena. A "no return on exit" policy was enforced. Harrington's skeletonized body was found at Anchorage Farm, Albemarle County on January 26, 2010. Jesse Matthew was later charged with Harrington's (and Hannah Graham's) abduction and murder, and he pled guilty to the crimes in exchange for life in prison in March 2016.

On December 5, 2009, Phish played the final show of their 2009 Fall Tour at the arena. At the beginning of a first set "Ya Mar", an erratic fan ran on stage fully naked. He hugged guitarist Trey Anastasio and kissed him on the cheek. He made three laps around the stage before finally being run down by security. Anastasio proceeded by saying, "Let's hear it for the naked guy, pick him up, that took a lot of balls." Later on, the lyrics of "Ya Mar" stated "he was a naked pa", and "Run like an Antelope" was changed to "Run like a Naked Guy, out of control".

In September 2010, the Professional Bull Riders (PBR) brought their Built Ford Tough Series tour to JPJ Arena; prior to this, the arena had hosted an event on the PBR's Enterprise Tour (which was one of the PBR's minor league tours that was eventually combined with the other minor league tours to create the Touring Pro Division in 2010).

On June 23, 2015, Paul McCartney played a sold-out show at John Paul Jones Arena as part of his 2015 Out There tour. Two days later, the arena hosted a rally to welcome home the 2015 Virginia Cavaliers baseball team following their College World Series championship.

On April 13, 2019, John Paul Jones Arena hosted Hot Wheels Monster Trucks Live.

On September 13, 2019, the Virginia Men's Basketball team got their 2019 NCAA tournament championship rings at John Paul Jones Arena. Fans got to see the stars of the team and also got to see the raising of the 2019 NCAA Tournament National Champions banner.

On April 23, 2023, Tina Fey appeared at John Paul Jones Arena as part of the "UVA President’s Speaker for the Arts" series, a conversation which was moderated by University of Virginia President, James E. Ryan.

== See also ==
- List of NCAA Division I basketball arenas
- List of basketball arenas
