= Joaquin Rams =

American murderer and suspected serial killer

- Born: John Anthony Ramirez; 1972 (age 53–54); New York, U.S.
- Status: Incarcerated
- Motive: Life insurance money
- Conviction: Capital murder
- Penalty: Life imprisonment without parole

Details
- Victims: 1–3
- Span of crimes: 2003–2012
- Country: United States
- State: Virginia
- Date apprehended: 2012
- Imprisoned at: Red Onion State Prison, Wise County, Virginia

Joaquin Shadow Rams Sr. (born John Anthony Ramirez; 1972) is an American murderer and suspected serial killer. Convicted and sentenced to life imprisonment for the drowning death of his 15-month-old son Prince in October 2012, he is additionally suspected in the deaths of his ex-girlfriend and mother, as in all of these cases, he had taken out insurance policies with large sums on the victims.

== Early life ==
Little is known about Rams' early years and upbringing. Born John Anthony Ramirez in 1972, in New York now living in Manassas, Virginia, he was the third child of Alma Collins, who had had 2 other sons in New York. According to 2nd older half-brother, Joseph Velez, Joaquin's violent tendencies showed at just three years of age, when he hit him on the head with a hammer while faking a request for a kiss. Prior to his arrest for his son's death, Rams had several run-ins with the law, among them for running an online pornography business and an alleged rape of a 19-year-old woman in 2012, which he claimed was consensual, although the woman - Lara McLeod - claimed otherwise.

== Murders ==
=== Shawn Mason ===
The first death surrounding Rams was that of his ex-girlfriend and mother of his first son, 22-year-old Shawn Katrina Mason, who was found with a single gunshot wound to the head at her Manassas apartment in March 2003. According to Rams, he had broken into the apartment because he couldn't contact her, and when he found the body, he immediately phoned the authorities. Upon their arrival, the officers arrested Joaquin for the break-in, two gun-related charges, and burglary, but Rams wasn't charged in Mason's death. According to Manassas police, he remains the prime suspect in her death, as he tried to collect a $143,000 insurance policy from her employer, falsely believing that he was the beneficiary.

=== Alma Collins ===
In 2008, Joaquin's mother, Alma Collins, was found asphyxiated at her home in rural Bristow. Initially, the Prince William County authorities ruled the death a suicide, which was disputed by her son Joseph Velez and sister Elva Carabello. In this case, Rams collected a $162,000 insurance policy, and he remains a suspect in her death.

=== Prince McLeod Rams ===
In 2010, Joaquin began an online relationship with 29-year-old Hera McLeod, a woman from Gaithersburg, Maryland. The two stuck together until July 2011, shortly after their son Prince was born, upon which Hera left him. She was granted sole custody of Prince in March 2012, but the Montgomery County court still allowed supervised visits with a retired police officer for Rams, despite McLeod's objections. Eventually, the supervision requirement was lifted by Justice Michael J. Algeo, allowing Rams to take his son on the weekends. On one such visit on October 20, 2012, Prince fell unconscious at his father's house, which was shared with a married couple. When paramedics arrived, they found the toddler naked and wet on the floor, with Rams explaining that he had given him a cold bath in attempt to prevent a fever-induced seizure, something Prince was known to suffer from. After failing to resuscitate him for 40 minutes, the child was taken to Inova Fairfax Hospital, where he died the next day.

== Trial and imprisonment ==
After his son's death, Joaquin Rams was arrested, as two previous other people close to him had died in similar suspicious circumstances, with CPS finding peculiar injuries on the boy's body, including dried out blood in his nose and a bruise on his forehead. In addition, it was also discovered that he had tried to collect several life insurance policies issued on his son, all of them amounting to more than $560,000. He denied responsibility, claiming that Prince had died from the seizure.

At his capital murder trial, a medical examiner stated that although Prince Rams did have a history of seizure, one hadn't occurred on that day. Prosecutors speculated that his motive for the murder was deep financial troubles, a sentiment backed by four jailhouse informants who testified against Rams. Although the child's death was ruled to be undetermined, Justice Randy Bellows found the defendant guilty of his son's death, as all evidence pointed that Joaquin had planned out the killing since he took insurance policies in September 2011, when the child was only two months old. In exchange for waiving his right to a jury trial, Rams was spared a death sentence and instead received a life sentence without parole. He is currently imprisoned at the Red Onion State Prison, and remains to be charged with the other deaths.

Later, Hera McLeod, sued the psychologist who testified that Joaquin could be alone, safely, with Price. She won $550,000 in a wrongful death settlement.
