= Shooting of Liz Barraza =

Unsolved shooting in Tomball, Texas, US

Coordinates: 30.123894546173062°N 95.5579829384099°W

- Location: Tomball, Texas (Houston)
- Date: January 25, 2019; 7 years ago
- Attack type: Shooting
- Weapon: Revolver
- Deaths: 1
- Victim: Liz Barraza
- Website: www.whokilledlizbarraza.com
- Locations 1 06:47-06:50 CCTV footage of suspicious vehicle circling school parking lot 2 06:52 Shooting location, garage sale, Barraza home 3 06:57 the suspicious dark pickup vehicle flees turning into Sandusky Drive

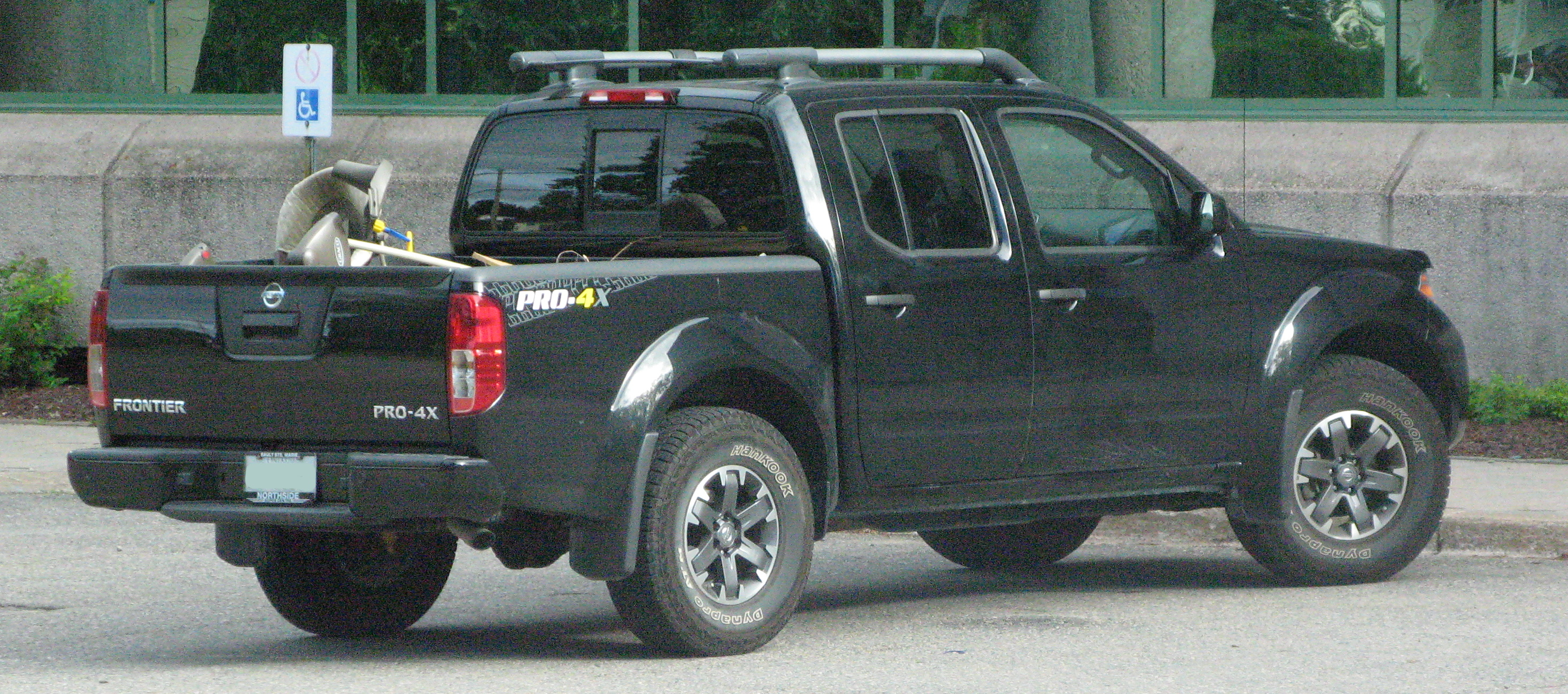
Black 2019 Nissan Frontier Pro-4X similar to the suspicious vehicle that was recorded on video fleeing the scene

On the morning of January 25, 2019, Elizabeth Nuelle Barraza was shot at her home in Tomball, Texas, part of Houston Metropolitan Area. She died of her injuries a day later on January 26 after being transferred to hospital. As of 2026, the case remains unsolved garnering international interest.

== Background ==
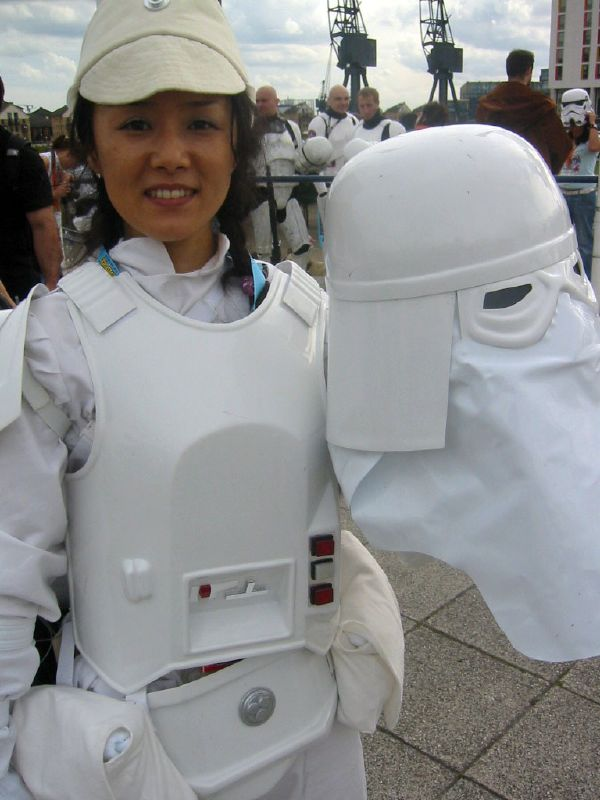
Unrelated 501st Legion cosplayer dressed as stormtrooper

Liz Barraza was born Elizabeth Nuelle to parents Bob and Rosemary Nuelle, and married to Sergio for nearly 5 years. Barraza had been arranging a garage sale on the driveway of her home. She had been a member of 501st Legion and a stormtrooper helmet was among the items she was selling. She had taken the day off from her job as a data reporter for a pipeline inspection company.

== Murder ==
She visited Starbucks at 06:08, and at 06:48 her husband left for work via Princeton Place Drive. Local surveillance video footage recovered showed a suspect approaching her at 06:52, apparently shooting her, then sprinting away. Poor quality audio was also recorded via her Google Nest doorbell camera which appeared to record a conversation between her and the suspect. Shots appeared to have been fired at point blank range and before fleeing, the suspect stood over her momentarily.

== Investigation ==
Harris County Sheriffs, Texas Rangers and the FBI have investigated the case and found no evidence against her husband. Nothing was stolen but a vehicle of interest resembling a black (or dark) 2019 Nissan Frontier Pro-4X (or possibly Nissan Titan) was recorded on video first around 02:00 driving by the Barraza home, then at 06:48 at a nearby school parking lot. A few minutes later, Barraza's husband passed by on his way to work, then the vehicle traveled somewhere for a few minutes then to the scene. The suspect on video has never been officially positively identified but appeared to wear a loose robe and long hair down. The vehicle sped away after the shooting and was also then sighted on surveillance footage (from another camera) traveling south on Sandusky Drive at 06:57-06:58.

== Aftermath ==
A memorial bench was placed in nearby Burroughs Park in 2025. In May 2025 police investigators confirmed life insurance had not been paid out.

The case remains unsolved and a $50,000 reward is offered via Crime Stoppers USA Houston. In May 2026, Liz's father passed away and was posthumously honored in a service at the aforementioned bench. Nuelle was also an active member of Parents of Murdered Children and Crime Victims United.

== Media ==
External videos
- The Garage Sale Murder Somebody Knows Something, 2026

In 2022, Paula Zahn covered the case in On the Case with Paula Zahn - "A Fairy Tale Ruined" (Season 25, Episode 7) A short report also appears on NBC.

In 2026, it will feature on Unsolved Mysteries. It was also the subject of season 1 episode 6 of Somebody Knows Something (with Kara Robinson) on ABC on September 7.

=== Podcasts ===
In 2026, a three part podcast was also produced by The Consult (Real FBI Profilers). It has also been an episode of Crime Junkie in 2025 and True Crime Broads.

== See also ==
- Killing of Missy Bevers – Murdered American fitness instructor in 2016. Another unsolved early morning killing of a woman in 2010s Texas (before Barraza) where the suspect appears on camera potentially in disguise.
