= Solitary: Inside Red Onion State Prison =

- Film poster
- Directed by: Kristi Jacobson
- Music by: T. Griffin
- Country of origin: United States
- Original language: English

Production
- Producers: Julie Goldman; Kristi Jacobson; Katie Mitchell
- Cinematography: Nelson Hume
- Editor: Ben Gold
- Running time: 82 minutes
- Production company: HBO

Original release
- Network: HBO
- Release: December 9, 2016

Solitary: Inside Red Onion State Prison is a documentary film by HBO about Red Onion State Prison, a supermax prison, in the U.S. state of Virginia, focusing on the use and effects of solitary confinement.

One of the inmates featured in the documentary, Randall Via, later became known for hosting The Red Onion Randy Podcast, which he records from within the Virginia Department of Corrections.
