= Disappearance of Kyron Horman =

Unsolved 2010 disappearance of an American boy

Kyron Horman
- Horman at his school's science fair on June 4, 2010, shortly before his disappearance.
- Born: Kyron Richard Horman; September 9, 2002; Portland, Oregon, U.S.
- Disappeared: June 4, 2010 (aged 7); Portland, Oregon, U.S.
- Status: Missing for 16 years, 5 months and 17 days
- Education: Skyline Elementary School
- Occupation: Student
- Parents: Kaine Horman (father); Desiree Young (mother)
- Relatives: Terri Horman (stepmother)

On June 4, 2010, Kyron Richard Horman, a seven‑year‑old elementary student, disappeared from Skyline Elementary School in Portland, Oregon, United States, after attending a science fair. His stepmother, Terri, last saw him walking to his classroom before she left the school at about 8:45 am and ran errands. Terri reported Kyron missing after he failed to return home on the school bus and discovered his teacher had marked him absent for the day. Local and state police, along with the Federal Bureau of Investigation (FBI), conducted an extensive search and launched the largest criminal investigation in Oregon's history.

In late June 2010, investigators alleged that Terri had offered money to their landscaper to kill her husband, Kyron's father Kaine; Terri denied the claim. Kaine filed for divorce and obtained a restraining order against Terri. Kyron's mother, Desiree Young, filed a civil lawsuit against Terri in June 2012, alleging she was responsible for her son's disappearance; Young later dropped the lawsuit.

The Multnomah County Sheriff's Office digitized the entire case file in 2025 and announced in June 2026 their use of new technology to aid in the search for Kyron. As a result of this process, the FBI is reexamining the case. As of 2026, Kyron's whereabouts remain unknown.

== Background ==
Kyron Richard Horman was born September 9, 2002, in Portland, Oregon, to Desiree Young and Kaine Horman, an engineer at Intel. The couple divorced eight months into Young's pregnancy, with Young citing irreconcilable differences. They initially shared custody of Kyron, but in 2004 Young was diagnosed with kidney failure that required extensive medical treatment. As a result, Kaine assumed full custody, though Young remained actively involved in Kyron's upbringing.

In 2007, Kaine married Terri Moulton (born March 14, 1970), a substitute teacher originally from Roseburg. Kaine and Moulton had begun a relationship around 2001 while he and Young were in the process of divorcing. The couple married in 2007 during a trip to Kauaʻi, Hawaii. In December 2008, Moulton gave birth to their daughter, Kiara. At the time, Kyron was a student at Skyline Elementary School near Forest Park.

== Disappearance ==
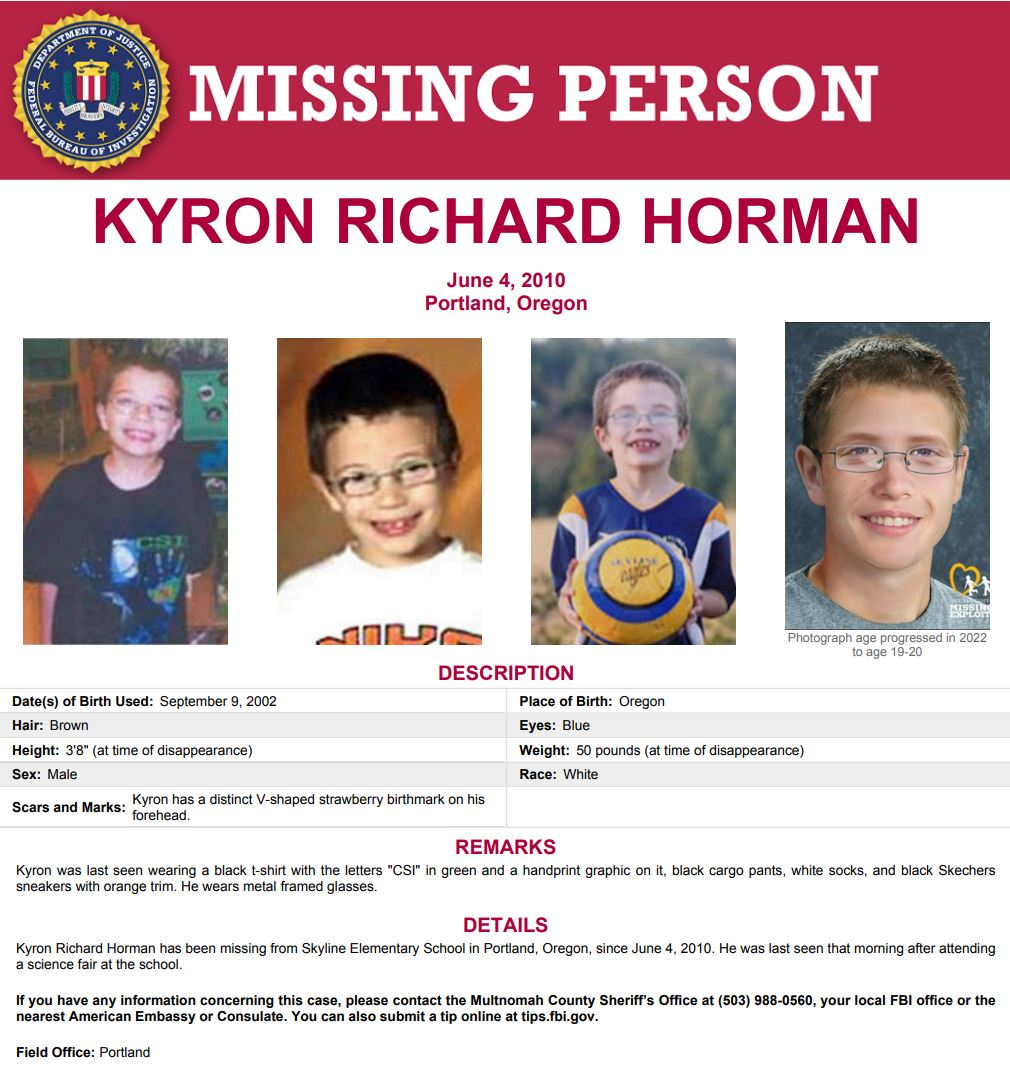
Missing poster produced by the FBI

Locations June 4, 2010
1 08:45 Skyline Elementary School, where Kyron Horman was last seen.
2 09:00–09:12 Terri visits Fred Meyer groceries, 7355 NE Imbrie Dr, Hillsboro, OR 97124 where prescription was unavailable.
3 09:30–10:00 Terri visits Fred Meyer groceries, 15995 SW Walker Rd, Beaverton, OR 97006.
4 10:10 Terri visits Michael's Craft, 18069 NW Evergreen Pkwy, Beaverton, OR 97006.
5 11:39–12:20 Terri visits 24 Hour Fitness gym, 1265 NW Waterhouse Ave, Beaverton, OR 97006.

On June 4, 2010, Kyron was taken to Skyline Elementary School by his stepmother, Terri, who remained with him while he attended a science fair. Terri stated that she left the school at approximately 8:45 a.m. and last saw Kyron walking down the hallway toward his classroom. When Kyron did not return home on the school bus at 3:30 p.m., Terri contacted the school and learned that his teacher had marked him absent for the day. She reported his disappearance to police at 3:45 p.m. The search for Kyron began at 4:33 p.m., with officers responding to both the school and the Horman residence.

According to Terri's statements to investigators, after leaving the school at 8:45 a.m., she ran errands at two Fred Meyer grocery stores until about 10:10 a.m. Between then and 11:39 a.m., she said she drove her daughter around in an effort to soothe the toddler's earache. Terri reported that she then went to a local gym and exercised until about 12:40 p.m. By 1:21 p.m., she had returned home and posted photographs of Kyron at the science fair on Facebook.

== Investigation and search efforts ==
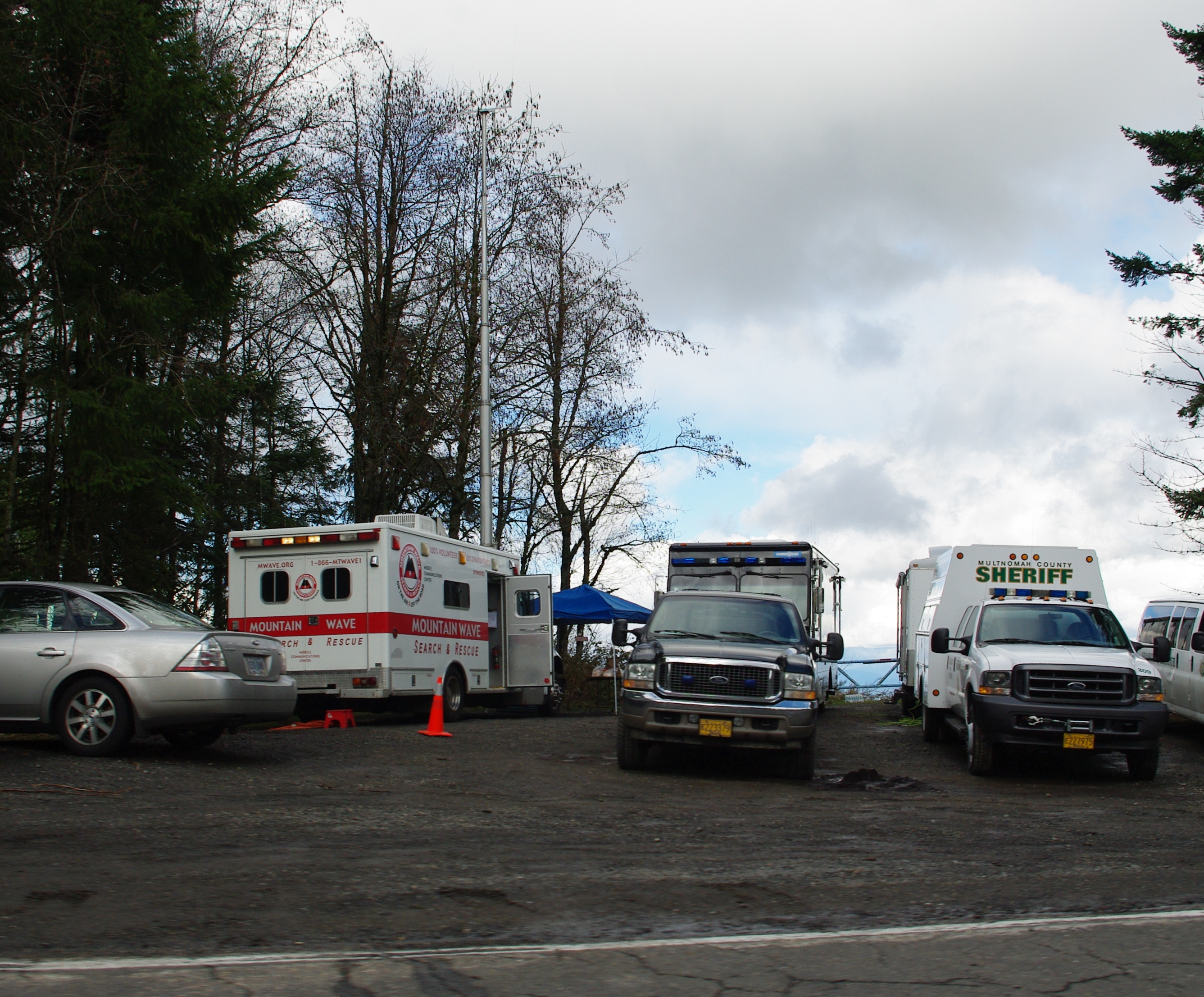
Search and rescue vehicles along Skyline Boulevard during search in March 2011

Search efforts for Kyron were extensive and primarily focused on a 2-mile (3.2 km) radius around Skyline Elementary and on Sauvie Island, approximately 6 miles (9.7 km) away. Law enforcement did not disclose their reasons for searching the area where they did, which included a search of the Sauvie Island Bridge. On June 9, 2010, the Horman family, who had initially refused to speak with the media, released a statement:

Kyron's family would like to thank people for support and interest in finding their son. The outpouring of support and continued effort strengthens their hope. We need for folks to continue to assist us in our goal. Please search your properties — cars, out buildings, sheds, etc. Also check with neighbors and friends who may be on vacation or may need in assistance in searching. There are a lot of resources here to help you search, so please don't stop. It is obviously a difficult time and they want to speak to the public so you can hear it from Kyron's family as they come together to share their message. Their objective is to keep the focus on Kyron and not about anything else.

On June 12, around 300 trained rescuers were on the ground searching wooded areas near the school. The search for Kyron, which spanned ten days, was the largest in Oregon history and included over 1,300 searchers from Oregon, Washington and California. A reward posted for information leading to the discovery of Kyron, which was initially $25,000, increased to $50,000 in late July 2010. By November 29, 2010, search efforts in Kyron's case had cost an estimated $1.4 million, according to county commissioners, and yielded 4,257 tips.

In a May 2017 report by Portland station KGW, Kyron's case was described as still "active and ongoing." Two months later, in July 2017, law enforcement conducted further searches along Skyline Boulevard, but the searches yielded no results.

In 2025, the Multnomah County Sheriff's Office completed digitization of over 5,300 documents in the case, and announced in June 2026 that they would be "leveraging new technology tools to advance the investigation." KGW reported that following this process, the FBI's Behavioral Analysis Unit will reexamine the case file. Multnomah County District Attorney Nathan Vasquez reported that law enforcement was "working on this behind the scenes, following every possible clue. We are as determined today as we were in the days after Kyron disappeared, and my office will not rest until we have answered the question of what happened to Kyron Horman [...] We will continue our hunt for justice for as long as it takes." Sheriff Nicole Morrisey O'Donnell added, "Our commitment to Kyron's case remains as strong today as it was when he was first reported missing. We will keep doing everything we can to provide Kyron's family the resolution they deserve."

If Kyron is alive, he would be 24 years old, as of November 12, 2026.

== Legal proceedings ==
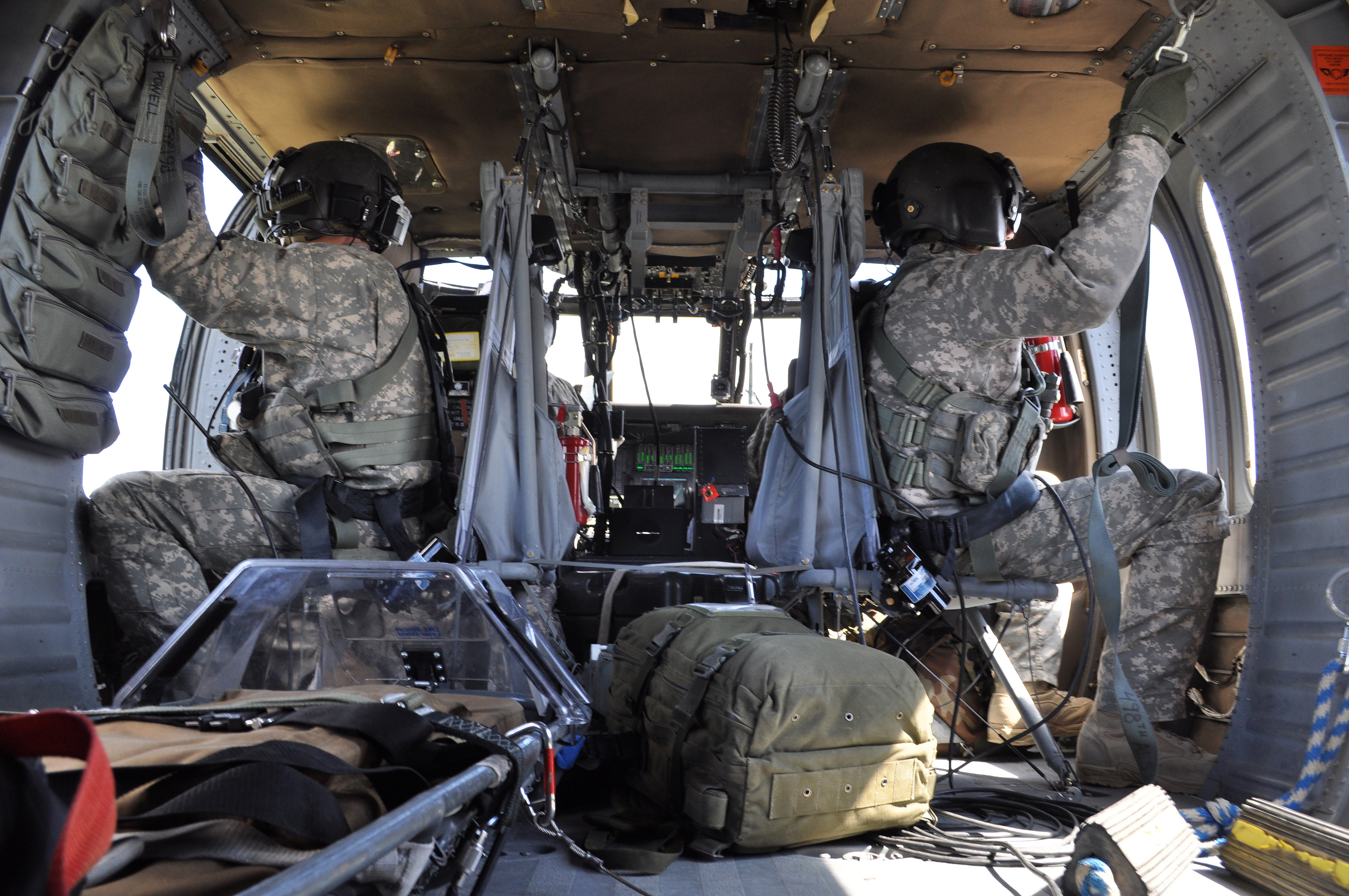
Oregon Army National Guard soldiers providing air support in the search for Horman

In late June 2010, in the midst of the search, Kaine was reportedly told by investigators that Terri had offered their landscaper, Rodolfo Sanchez, "a lot of money" to kill her husband. Sanchez testified in a deposition that Terri approached him to help kill her husband in January 2010, five months before Kyron's disappearance; in her own deposition, Terri denied the charge. Investigators convinced Sanchez to confront Terri while wearing an audio surveillance device, but they were unable to obtain any evidence and could not make an arrest. On June 28, Kaine filed for divorce and obtained a restraining order against Terri. The divorce was granted and Terri was eventually granted supervised visitation with her daughter.

During this time, Terri failed two separate polygraph examinations regarding Kyron's disappearance. In August 2010, it was announced that law enforcement were searching for an individual allegedly seen by two witnesses sitting inside Terri's truck outside Skyline Elementary the day of the disappearance. Bruce McCain, a former sheriff for the Multnomah County Sheriff's Office, told CBS News: "The identity of that second person, if he or she existed, could be critical in determining what happened to Kyron after 9 a.m. on June 4."

=== Grand jury ===
In July 2010, a Multnomah County grand jury subpoenaed several friends of Terri, including DeDe Spicher, whom Young and Kaine described as having "been in close communication with Terri" and "providing Terri with support and advice that is not in the best interests of our son." According to law enforcement, Spicher was "extremely cooperative" and allowed a search of her property and car, as well as enduring three hours of questioning from detectives. On the day of Kyron's disappearance, Spicher was gardening for a homeowner on Germantown Road in Northwest Portland and was allegedly unaccounted for during a three-hour period, though Spicher claimed she had never left the property. She also helped Terri purchase an untraceable cell phone after Kaine had moved out of the house. During this time, Spicher told journalists: "There's this horror that my friend is going through. If I thought for a second that she was capable of [foul play], I would not have been there. She would not have been my friend in the first place."

In early August 2010, Young, Kaine and the Skyline Elementary School principal were subpoenaed and testified during the grand jury hearing. In December 2010, it was reported by The Oregonian that the grand jury had yet to provide compelling evidence yielding a potential indictment.

In May 2017, it was reported by Portland station KGW that a secret grand jury panel continued to hear evidence in Kyron's disappearance, and had convened on multiple occasions.

=== Lawsuit against Terri Horman ===
On June 1, 2012, Young filed a civil lawsuit against Terri, claiming that she was "responsible for the disappearance of Kyron." The lawsuit attempted to prove that Terri had kidnapped Kyron on the day he disappeared. Young sought $10 million in damages. On August 15, 2012, a federal court judge denied a motion by Terri to delay the lawsuit.

On July 30, 2013, it was announced that Young had dropped the lawsuit against Terri so as not to interfere with the ongoing police investigation.

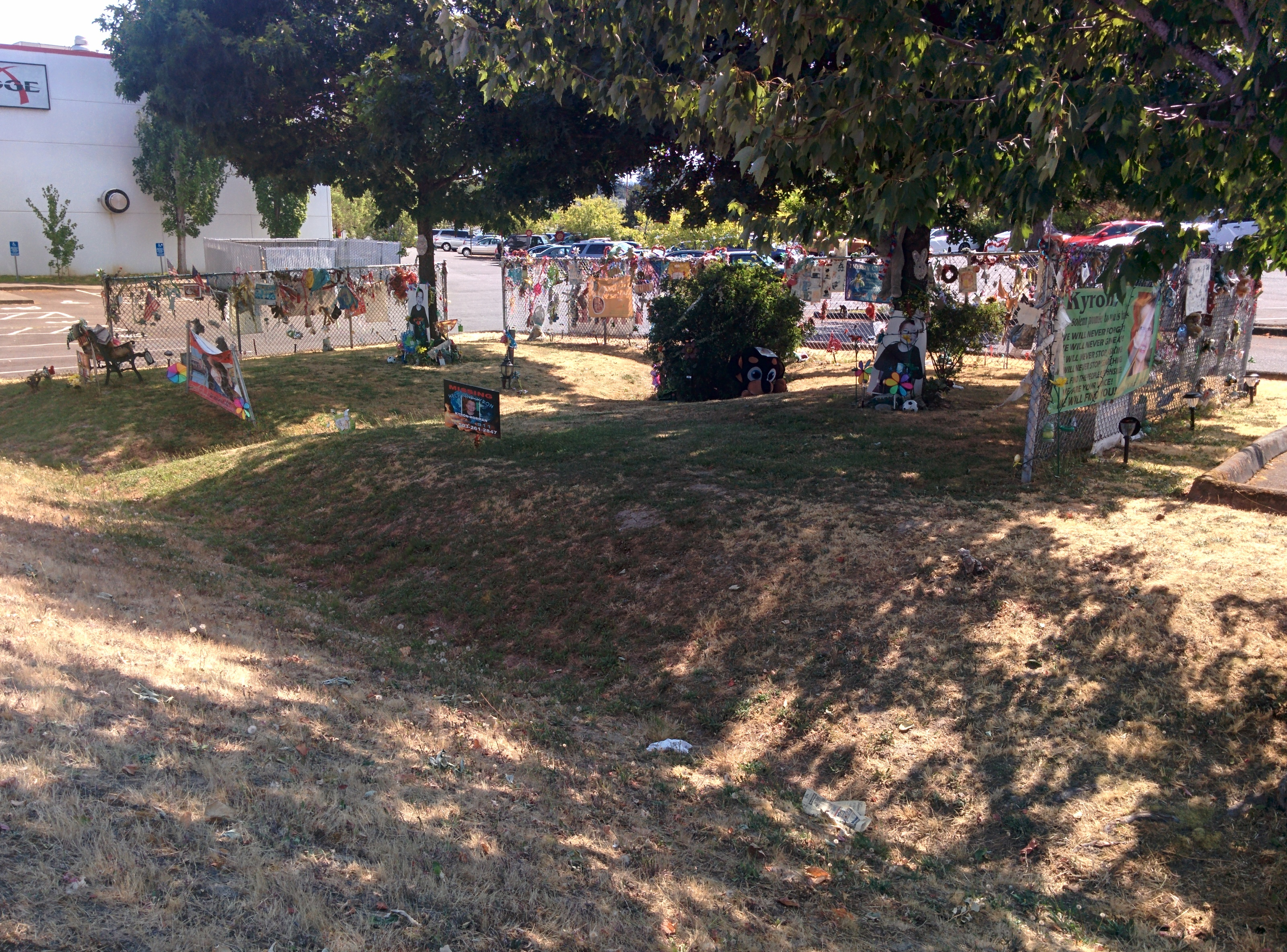
Memorial for Horman, 2015

== Media ==
Terri appeared as a guest on Dr. Phil in 2016, during which she told Phil McGraw: "I was advised from the beginning by law enforcement, by my husband at the time, by attorneys in the beginning, not to say anything. I've always wanted to. I've asked multiple times to speak out and have not been allowed." She denied having any involvement in Kyron's disappearance, and also stated her belief that he was kidnapped, adding: "There was a man in a white pickup truck, Ford, parked on Highway 30 at the 7-Eleven, which is not near the school. He was acting very strangely and he was addressed by one of the employees because he had been pacing back and forth in front of the 7-Eleven for about an hour."

External videos
- Lost at the Science Fair, Somebody Knows Something, 2026

In 2026, the case was featured in Kara Robinson Chamberlain's show Somebody Knows Something.

== Bibliography ==
- Boy Missing: The Search for Kyron Horman, written by Rebecca Morris, was released in May 2020.

== See also ==
- List of people who disappeared
- List of kidnappings
