= The Anchorage (Charlottesville, Virginia) =

Historic house in Virginia, United States

- U.S. National Register of Historic Places
- Virginia Landmarks Register
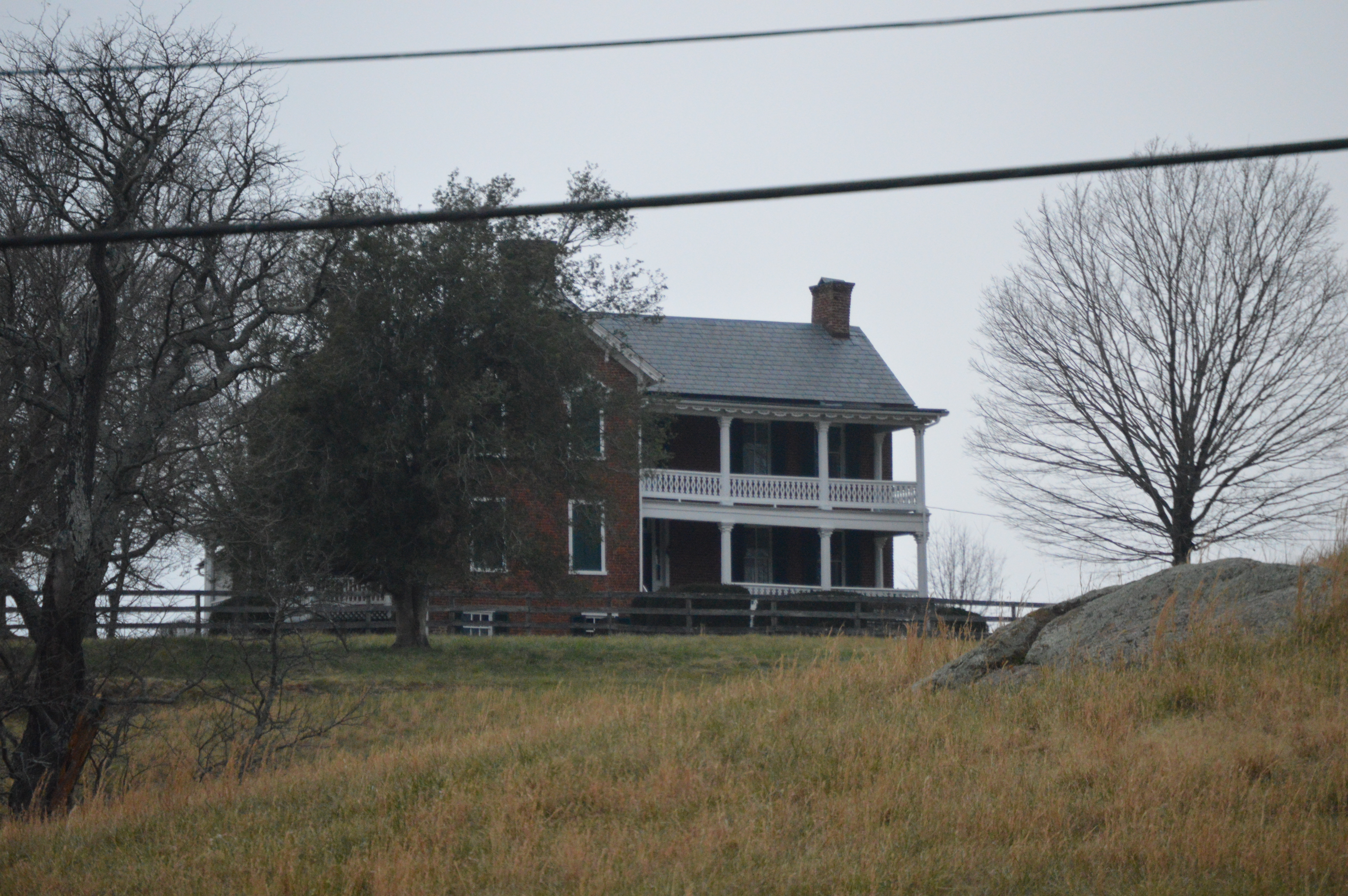
- Distant view from U.S. Route 29

- Location within Virginia Location within the United States
- Location: 1864 Anchorage Farm, near Charlottesville, Virginia
- Coordinates: 37°58′24″N 78°37′00″W
- Area: 100 acres (40 ha)
- Built: c. 1825, c. 1850
- Architectural style: Gothic Revival, Italianate
- NRHP reference No.: 01000688
- VLR No.: 002-0734

Significant dates
- Added to NRHP: July 13, 2001
- Designated VLR: March 14, 2001

The Anchorage is a historic home and farm complex located near Charlottesville, Albemarle County, Virginia. The original section of the house, built about 1825, consists of a two-story, brick hall and parlor plan dwelling with a raised basement and a slate roof. About 1850, a north facing brick wing was added and the house was remodeled to reflect the then popular Italianate and Gothic Revival styles. An existing porch was later made two-story, and, in the early 1900s, a small wood framed kitchen wing was added. Also on the property are a contributing barn and family cemetery.

It was added to the National Register of Historic Places in 2001.
