= Kimberly Corban =

American activist (born 1985)

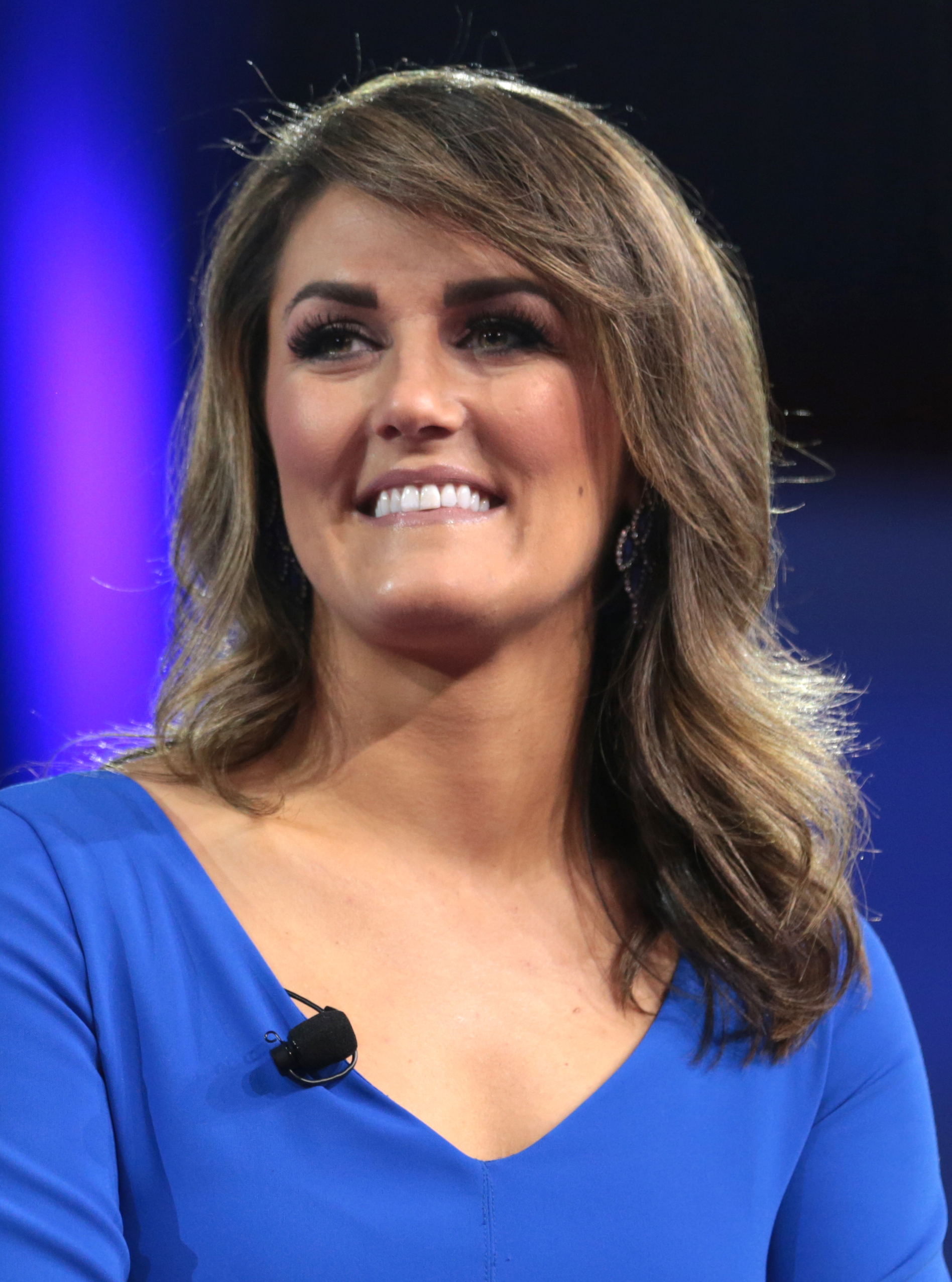
Corban in 2017

Kimberly S. Corban (born 1985) is a rape survivor and crime victim advocate. She is notable for her victim advocacy speeches, a nationally televised question at CNN's 'Guns in America' Town hall hosted by Anderson Cooper with former president Barack Obama to discuss the Second Amendment and her 2018 TEDx Talk, 'How my sexual assault was hijacked by politicians and lobbies'.

== Background ==
In May 2006, when Corban was a 20-year-old college student, a stranger broke into her off-campus apartment at the University of Northern Colorado, held her there for two hours, and raped her. After surviving the assault, she immediately reported the crime to the Greeley Police Department. She later served as the key witness in her attacker's 2007 Weld County, Colorado trial, resulting in a burglary and sexual assault conviction. Her rapist is currently serving a 24-life term in a Colorado prison.

Following the jury's guilty verdict, Corban released her name to the media, intending to serve as an example for other rape victims to come forward. She has given presentations to numerous advocate groups, high schools and colleges, justice professionals, and various government agencies internationally on sexual assaults, using her case to illustrate how she believes the criminal justice system should work.

Corban graduated from the University of Northern Colorado with a bachelor's degree in Psychology and master's degree in Criminal Justice. She worked as a victim advocate for her local police department and later at the District Attorney's office, creating and running the Adult Diversion Program.

In January 2016, Kimberly Corban attended CNN's 'Guns in America' Townhall with Barack Obama. Corban shared with the president her survivor story and then described her belief that she had the basic responsibility to protect herself and her children by exercising her right to bear arms and carry her weapon as well.

Corban delivered a TEDx talk on December 1, 2018, titled 'How my sexual assault was hijacked by politicians and lobbies'. The talk discussed how both sides of the political spectrum weaponize survivors of sexual assault to gain money, power, and votes.

Corban has been featured in many forms of media, including CNN, Fox News, The Washington Post, USA Today, Cosmopolitan magazine, Elle magazine, MSN.com, and The New York Times. Today, she is an international speaker on sexual violence prevention and best practices for supporting trauma survivors. She also consults with organizations and communities on the Start By Believing campaign. Corban is the co-host of a podcast called Survivor's Guide To True Crime.
