= Murder of Morgan Dana Harrington =

Murder of American student

Morgan Dana Harrington
- Born: July 24, 1989; Charlottesville, Virginia, U.S.
- Disappeared: October 17, 2009 (aged 20); Charlottesville, Virginia, U.S.
- Cause of death: Homicide
- Body discovered: January 26, 2010
- Known for: Missing person and murder victim

Morgan Dana Harrington (July 24, 1989 – October 17, 2009) was a 20-year-old Virginia Tech student who disappeared from the John Paul Jones Arena while attending a Metallica concert at the University of Virginia (UVA) in Charlottesville, Virginia.

Her remains were discovered three months later in rural farmland. A forensic connection was later made to Jesse L. Matthew, Jr., the prime suspect in the murder of Hannah Graham, another UVA student who is believed to have been abducted on September 13, 2014. On September 15, 2015, Matthew was formally charged with first-degree murder and abduction with intent to defile in the murder of Harrington. On March 2, 2016, Matthew pleaded guilty to the abduction and murder of both Graham and Harrington, receiving four consecutive life sentences with no possibility of parole.

== Disappearance ==
On October 17, 2009, Harrington and three friends drove to the John Paul Jones Arena at the University of Virginia in Charlottesville for a Metallica concert. During the opening act's performance, Harrington told friends that she was going to the restroom. She mysteriously left the arena in search of a restroom, despite 18 female restrooms being provided inside the secured arena. A "no return on exit" policy was enforced. When she did not return, they called her cell phone at 8:48pm and she told them that she was locked out of the arena because of its "no re-entry" policy, adding that she would find a way home and they should not worry. According to witness reports, she was last seen at around 9:30pm hitchhiking on a nearby bridge. There were also two witnesses who claimed to have seen her with three men after she had left the arena.

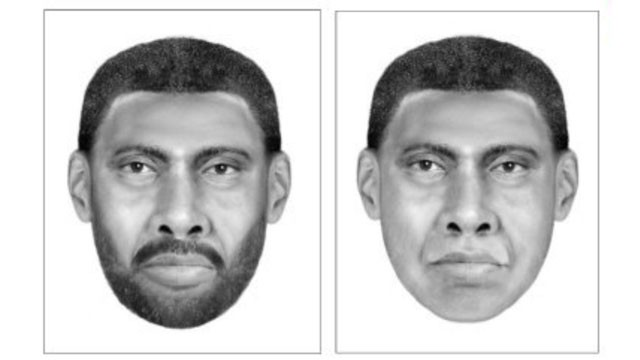
Police composite sketch of suspect.

Harrington's purse, containing her identification and cell phone (with batteries removed), was discovered in the RV lot at UVA's Lannigan Athletic Field following her disappearance. Her remains were discovered by a farmer on January 26, 2010, about ten miles (16 km) from the arena, in a remote area of the 742-acre (3.00 km^{2}) Anchorage Farm, more than one-and-a-half miles from road access. Although investigators did not release information about her death, her parents confirmed that it had been very violent and that bones were broken. Her mother Gil later confirmed that her daughter had been raped.

In April 2010, forensic tests confirmed that a Pantera T-shirt, which had been found in November 2009 outside of an apartment building about a mile-and-a-half from the arena, was indeed the shirt Harrington had been wearing on the night she went missing. Police also determined a forensic link between Harrington's murder and an abduction and sexual assault in Fairfax in September 2005. They also believed that the killer was familiar with the area where Harrington's body was found.

== Aftermath ==
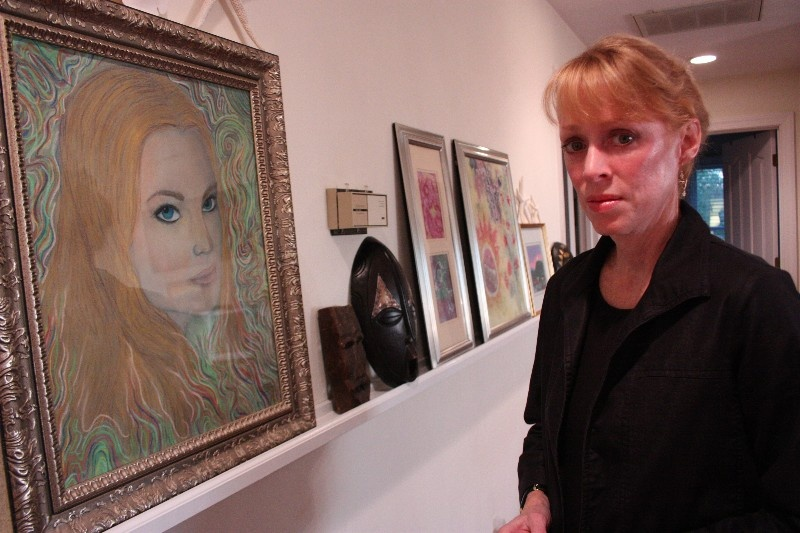
Morgan Harrington's mother, Gil, with a self-portrait by her daughter.

The case achieved such widespread national attention that the Virginia General Assembly honored the murdered student with a special resolution.

The killing provoked fears, expressed by her parents in many meetings with media including national television broadcasts, that a serial killer might be living in Virginia. DNA was later tied to a September 2005 attempted abduction in Fairfax City.

Crimestoppers offered a $100,000 reward, and the band playing on the night of Harrington's death, Metallica, added an additional $50,000 reward for information leading to a conviction.

Her parents continued to appear at numerous special events, including the University of Virginia's annual "Take Back the Night" rally and urged UVA administrators to work toward a safer campus.

In September 2014, Harrington's case was linked to the murder of Hannah Graham in Charlottesville, Virginia, through "forensic evidence" pertaining to Jesse Matthew, the main suspect in the latter case. On October 20, 2014, Matthew was indicted in a 2005 abduction in Fairfax, Virginia. Over a decade earlier, Matthew had twice been accused of sexual assault at two separate Virginia colleges he attended as a student. He left each school immediately after each allegation. The reported assaults occurred within an 11-month period of each other, as Matthew moved from the evangelical Christian Liberty University in Lynchburg to Christopher Newport University in Newport News. Police investigated each report, but in neither incident was a criminal case brought against him. On the night of Morgan Harrington's disappearance Matthew was driving a taxicab in Charlottesville. On September 15, 2015, Jesse Matthew was formally charged with first-degree murder and abduction with intent to defile in the murder of Morgan Harrington. The trial date was originally set for October 17, 2016, and moved back to October 24, 2016, because October 17 is the anniversary of Harrington's disappearance.

On March 2, 2016, after Matthew pleaded guilty to the 2014 murder of Hannah Graham and the 2009 murder of Morgan Harrington, a judge sentenced him to four consecutive life sentences. Under the plea agreement terms, Matthew gives up his right to appeal and would not be eligible for geriatric release.

It was reported on May 21, 2019, by various local news outlets that Matthew was diagnosed with stage four colon cancer. He was transferred from the Red Onion State Prison in Wise County, VA, to Sussex I State Prison in Waverly, VA, for cancer treatment. Both the Harrington and Graham families were notified of his transfer.

== See also ==
- List of people who disappeared mysteriously: post-1970
