= Murder of Hannah Graham =

2014 American murder of college student

Hannah Graham
- Born: Hannah Elizabeth Graham; February 25, 1996; Reading, Berkshire, England
- Disappeared: September 13, 2014; Downtown Mall; Charlottesville, Virginia, United States
- Died: c. September 13, 2014 (aged 18); Albemarle County, Virginia, United States
- Cause of death: Homicide
- Body discovered: 37°55′26″N 78°36′55.5″W; 3193 Old Lynchburg Road; North Garden, Virginia; October 18, 2014
- Resting place: Ivy Hill Cemetery, Alexandria, Virginia, U.S.
- Education: West Potomac High School; University of Virginia
- Height: 5 ft 11 in (180 cm)
- Parent(s): Sue Graham (mother); John Graham (father)

Hannah Elizabeth Graham (February 25, 1996 – c. September 13, 2014) was an 18-year-old second-year British-born American student at the University of Virginia who went missing on September 13, 2014. She was last seen early in the morning that day, at the Downtown Mall in Charlottesville, Virginia. Five weeks later, her remains were discovered on Old Lynchburg Road, in southern Albemarle County. Jesse Matthew pleaded guilty to murdering Graham and was sentenced to life imprisonment. He was also found guilty and given three additional life sentences for other, previous crimes, including the murder of Morgan Dana Harrington.

== Background ==
Hannah Graham's friends last heard from her via text message at about 1:20 am on September 13, 2014, after she told them she was on her way to a party, but was lost. She had attended another party before disappearing.

According to surveillance footage and witness testimony, among the last places Graham was seen was at Tempo Restaurant with Jesse Leroy "LJ" Matthew Jr., a 32-year-old man and person of interest. A witness also said that Matthew was seen in the restaurant holding an arm around Graham, and that she looked drunk. The last witness to see Graham alive says that she was with a man who "did not look friendly." As Graham was standing by a vehicle identified to be Matthew's orange 1998 Chrysler Sebring, the witness heard her say, "I'm not getting in that car with you!"

Over a decade earlier, Matthew was twice accused of sexual assault at two separate Virginia colleges – Liberty University in Lynchburg and Christopher Newport University in Newport News – and left each school immediately after each allegation. The reported assaults occurred within an eleven-month period of each other. Police investigated each report, but in neither incident was a criminal case brought against him. On July 7, 2021, Matthew was named in a class action lawsuit against Liberty University alleging that he had sexually assaulted a 15-year-old girl while at Liberty University.

== Search ==
=== Volunteer search ===
On September 20, a volunteer search for Graham took place throughout Charlottesville. Over 1,000 volunteers were reported to have been involved in the search.

=== Search efforts ===
On September 25, Charlottesville police chief Timothy Longo said he believed that Graham was either in Charlottesville or one of the surrounding nine counties, and asked property owners to search for her on their own land. The Department of Emergency Management organized two-person search teams in the search for Graham and estimated that as of September 26, those crews spent 44 hours in the field since the volunteer search.

=== Remains found ===
On October 18, 2014, human remains were found in southern Albemarle County, by searchers from the Chesterfield County Sheriff's Office. At a press conference later that day, Chief Longo stated that the remains had not been positively identified as Graham; however, authorities informed Graham's parents of the discovery. The remains were sent to the Chief Medical Examiner's office in Richmond for identification. On October 24, the remains were positively identified as Graham. That same day, Graham's parents visited the property where she was found.

On November 18, The Washington Post reported that a cause for Graham's death was determined but was withheld at the request of law enforcement. Later that day, the Albemarle County Police Department reversed course, releasing that Graham died of homicide by an "undetermined etiology".

== Suspect ==
On September 19, the local police identified a man they described as a "person of interest" whom they saw on surveillance cameras leaving a bar with Graham. The police have concluded that Graham may have gotten into a car with this man. They also searched the man's car and apartment, but declined to arrest or identify him at that time. The police identified the "person of interest" as Matthew the following day, in an effort to make contact with him for further questioning.

Police again searched Matthew's apartment on September 22; during the search, they took items of clothing from his apartment, but would not elaborate on the importance of these items. Police described the searches as a major break in the case and offered a US$100,000 reward (equivalent to $136,000 in 2025) for information relating to Graham's disappearance.

=== Arrest ===
On September 21, the police issued an arrest warrant for reckless driving by Matthew. On September 23, Longo announced that Matthew had been charged with abduction with intent to defile. On September 24, Longo, during a joint press conference with the FBI, announced that the suspect had been arrested in a sparsely populated part of Galveston County, Texas, after being recognized by a woman on a beach.

=== Legal proceedings ===
Matthew's first court appearance was scheduled for December 4, 2014. Matthew's attorney stated that he would not ask the court for bail for his client.

On February 10, 2015, Albemarle County commonwealth's attorney Denise Lunsford announced that Matthew was being indicted for first-degree murder of Graham, in addition to the abduction charges. On May 5, 2015, prosecutors announced that Matthew would be charged with capital murder. The increased charge of capital murder meant that Matthew could have faced the death penalty if convicted. The trial date was set for July 5, 2016. On March 2, 2016, Matthew pleaded guilty. Later, Matthew received four additional life terms.

=== Fairfax case ===
On October 20, 2014, Matthew was indicted on charges of attempted murder, object sexual penetration, and abduction with intent to defile from an incident that occurred in September 2005 in Fairfax, Virginia. On November 14, 2014, Matthew pleaded not guilty to the charges, and a trial was set to begin on March 9, 2015. On February 6, 2015, the Fairfax trial was postponed, with a new trial to be set on February 13. On February 18, Matthew appeared in court, where Albemarle County Circuit Judge Cheryl Higgins scheduled his jury trial to begin on June 29.

However, the trial began on June 8, and on June 10, Matthew abruptly entered an Alford plea, and was convicted on all charges. On October 2, 2015, Matthew was sentenced to three life terms in the Fairfax case.

=== Connection to Morgan Harrington case ===
On September 29, 2014, it was reported that forensic evidence taken from the investigation into the murder of Morgan Dana Harrington in 2009 matched evidence taken from Matthew. Sources close to the Graham investigation added that Harrington interacted with Matthew on the night she disappeared. Graham's remains were found about 5 miles (8 km) from the location where Harrington's remains were discovered.

On September 15, 2015, Matthew was formally charged with first degree murder and abduction with intent to defile in the murder of Harrington. In a February 29, 2016, letter to news media, prosecutors said Matthew would plead guilty. Matthew pleaded guilty and received four additional life terms. As of May 2025, he is serving his sentences at Red Onion State Prison.

== Memorial ==
After Graham's remains were discovered and identified, students at UVA erected a memorial on grounds in her honor. The World Bank also holds an annual award for innovations to reduce gender-based violence held in memory of Graham. The Hannah E. Graham Memorial Scholarship was created in 2021 in honor of her dedication and participation in softball leagues around Northern Virginia.

== See also ==
- List of solved missing person cases (2010s)
