= Murder of Yeardley Love =

American murder case

- Location: 38.035568°N 78.498778°W; 222 14th Street, Charlottesville, Virginia, U.S.
- Date: May 3, 2010; 16 years ago
- Attack type: Murder by blunt force trauma
- Victims: Yeardley Reynolds Love, aged 22
- Perpetrator: George Wesley Huguely V
- Charges: First-degree murder; Second-degree murder (lesser included offense); Robbery of a residence; Burglary; Entering a house with an intent to commit a felony; Grand larceny
- Verdict: Guilty of second-degree murder and grand larceny; Not guilty on remaining charges
- Convictions: Second-degree murder, grand larceny
- Sentence: 23 years in prison plus 3 years probation

The murder of Yeardley Love took place on May 3, 2010, in Charlottesville, Virginia, United States. Love, a University of Virginia (UVA) women's lacrosse student-athlete, was found unresponsive in her Charlottesville apartment, and later that day, UVA men's lacrosse player George Wesley Huguely V was arrested by Charlottesville police. Huguely was tried and found guilty of Love's murder, receiving a 23-year prison sentence.

== Background ==
=== Yeardley Love ===
Yeardley Love
- Born: Yeardley Reynolds Love; July 17, 1987; Baltimore, Maryland, U.S.
- Died: May 3, 2010 (aged 22); Charlottesville, Virginia, U.S.
- Cause of death: Murder by blunt force trauma
- Education: University of Virginia
- Occupation: College student-athlete

Yeardley Reynolds Love was born on July 17, 1987, in Baltimore, Maryland, to John and Sharon Love. She resided in Cockeysville, Maryland. At Notre Dame Preparatory School, Love was a member of the varsity lacrosse and field hockey teams all four years, and was an All-County lacrosse player in 2006. She was admitted to the University of Virginia (UVA), where she majored in political science and minored in Spanish. She was also a member of the sorority Kappa Alpha Theta. As a member of the UVA women's lacrosse team, the Cavaliers, Love scored her first goal in her first game, playing against Virginia Tech. She started in nine of her sixteen games in 2009, and in three of her fifteen games in 2010.

=== George Huguely ===
George Huguely
- Born: George Wesley Huguely V September 17, 1987 (age 39); Washington, D.C.
- Occupation: College student-athlete (former)
- Status: In prison
- Convictions: Second degree murder, grand larceny
- Penalty: 23 years in prison plus 3 years probation

Details
- Imprisoned at: Beaumont Correctional Center

George Wesley Huguely V was born on September 17, 1987, in Washington, D.C., to George Wesley Huguely IV and Marta Sanson Lavarraque, who was first married to Andrew Murphy and whom she subsequently divorced. Huguely attended the all-boys Landon School in Bethesda, Maryland, and resided in Chevy Chase, Maryland. At Landon, Huguely played football, and was an All-American lacrosse player. During his senior year at Landon, he was the quarterback of the football team.

In 2007, Huguely was charged with underage possession of alcohol in Florida, where his family owns a vacation house. In 2008, he was arrested for public drunkenness and resisting arrest outside the Phi Kappa Sigma fraternity house located at Washington and Lee University. Police tased Huguely to subdue him. In that incident, he received a suspended sentence of sixty days and six months of probation, was fined, and was ordered to perform community service and participate in a drug treatment program. He did not disclose this arrest to UVA, despite a requirement to do so. During the 2010 season, Huguely was a midfielder for the Virginia Cavaliers men's lacrosse team. He majored in anthropology.

=== Love and Huguely's relationship ===
Love and Huguely met their freshman year, and were often seen hanging out together with their teammates. They had been dating for more than two years by the time of spring 2010, just prior to her murder. It was Huguely's aggressive behavior, triggered by alcohol, that caused their relationship to be on and off. In 2009, Huguely attacked a teammate after hearing that he had kissed Love. Before her murder, Huguely sent threatening text messages and emails to Love.

== Murder and initial arrest ==
Around 2:15 a.m. EDT (UTC−04:00) on May 3, 2010, Charlottesville police were called to Love's apartment on 14th Street in the University Corner district. At the scene, Love was found unresponsive, and was pronounced dead. The 9-1-1 call from Love's roommate reported that she suffered an alcohol overdose, but detectives noticed "obvious physical injuries to her body" upon arrival. The suspect, George Huguely, was living next door.

On May 4, Huguely was charged with murdering Love, and was held in the Albemarle-Charlottesville Regional Jail. At a May 6 court appearance, his attorney, Fran Lawrence, stated: “Ms. Love's death was not intended, but an accident with a tragic outcome.” Huguely appeared at the hearing via video.

Huguely and Love dated over the course of two years, but had broken up. At the Charlottesville police station, Huguely waived his Miranda rights, and narrated graphic details of his assaulting Love, stating that he kicked open her locked bedroom door, and “shook Love, and her head repeatedly hit the wall.” Huguely admitted that he took, and intended to destroy, her Apple laptop computer when he fled her apartment. Evidence that police seized from Huguely's apartment included two Apple laptop computers, a spiral notebook, two white socks, bathroom and entryway rugs, and a Virginia lacrosse shirt with a red stain. Investigators also followed leads of domestic violence between Huguely and Love, including threatening email and text messages that he sent to her post-breakup; a violent encounter between the couple that was broken up by several visiting lacrosse players from the University of North Carolina at Chapel Hill; and an incident in which Huguely attacked Love while drunk, whereafter Huguely claimed he did not recall hitting her. An unnamed student reported that the couple broke up after the drunken Huguely assaulted Love.

== Legal proceedings ==
A preliminary hearing for Huguely on a first-degree murder charge was held April 11, 2011, in Charlottesville District Court. Huguely continued to be held without bond at the Charlottesville jail. On January 7, 2012, prosecutors added five additional charges: felony murder, robbery of a residence, burglary, entering a house with an intent to commit a felony, and grand larceny. On April 18, 2011, a grand jury indicted Huguely on first-degree and felony murder charges, and a trial date of February 6, 2012, was set.

Closing arguments were made on February 18, and jury deliberations began on Tuesday, February 22. After deliberating for about nine hours, the jury delivered a verdict of guilty of second-degree murder and grand larceny. After a further two hours of deliberation, the jury recommended a 26-year sentence: 25 years for second-degree murder, and one year for grand larceny. The jury ruled out the "heat of passion" clause that characterizes voluntary manslaughter. A few of the jurors who spoke to the news media cited the importance of the videotape of Huguely's police interrogation, which was a central part of prosecutor Dave Chapman's case; the jury found that “pretty much every opportunity he had, he lied first. He was not telling the truth on several occasions.”

On May 8, 2012, non-jurors for the first time were able to see Huguely in a 64-minute video, in which he was told of Love's death. As he was interrogated by police, Huguely admitted, “I may have grabbed her neck,” and “maybe I shook her a little bit.” He then retells the argument and fight that happened in Love's bedroom, demonstrating how he shook her and kicked her door. Eventually, the detective informs Huguely that Love is dead. Huguely reacts in disbelief, and laments, “Kill me.” Because of the raw emotions seen in this tape, the jury was convinced that Love's murder was not premeditated.

=== Conviction and sentencing ===
On August 30, 2012, Huguely was formally sentenced to 23 years in prison by Judge Edward Hogshire, with sentences of 23 years for the second-degree murder conviction, and one year for the grand larceny conviction to run concurrently.

=== Appeals process ===
The Court of Appeals of Virginia issued a ruling on April 23, 2013, which granted Huguely an appeal based on two key issues. The court agreed with the defense's argument that Huguely's right to counsel was violated when one of his attorneys, Rhonda Quagliana, fell ill and missed a day of trial. The court also granted the appeal based on the failure to exclude "Juror 32," because of possible doubts about that juror's impartiality. The Court of Appeals then heard oral arguments from Huguely's new lawyer, former U.S. Solicitor General Paul Clement, on December 11, 2013. Clement argued for a new trial, arguing Huguely was denied his right to an attorney when one of his two lawyers fell ill during the trial. Nine days into the trial, Huguely co-counsel Quagliana became visibly ill with stomach flu, but the trial judge refused to grant a continuance, even though Huguely objected; co-counsel Frances Lawrence was asked by the trial judge whether he could proceed without Quagliana, and affirmed he could. In addition to raising questions about "Juror 32," Huguely's appeal team also objected to the trial judge's refusal to allow "blame the victim" questions of jurors, and said the jury was not properly instructed on the definition of "malice," an element in a second-degree murder conviction. The Court of Appeals ruled against Huguely on March 4, 2014, affirming the second-degree murder conviction. In November 2014, the Virginia Supreme Court declined to consider Huguely's appeal.

More than four years after Huguely was sent to prison, his mother, Marta Murphy, spoke out. Murphy said that her son should have been convicted of a lesser charge and face less prison time, as the murder was a "drunken accident." Murphy concluded that Huguely had no intent to murder Love, and that Love's death was caused by injuries sustained from falling off the bed. Marta Murphy claimed she waited to speak out in respect for Love's family. Murphy believes that the criminal justice system has proven to be wrong, and did not come to the correct verdict concerning her son.

=== Huguely in prison ===
In late September 2012, Huguely was moved from the Albemarle-Charlottesville Regional Jail to the Powhatan Reception and Classification Center. On October 15, 2012, he was assigned to Keen Mountain Correctional Center, a high-security state prison in the far southwestern corner of Virginia; Keen is a Level 4 facility in Virginia's six-tier system of rating prison security. A spokesperson for the Virginia Department of Corrections said Huguely must serve at least a year of his 23-year sentence with no major infractions before the state would consider allowing him to transfer to the Maryland prison system (where he could be closer to his parents' home in Bethesda). In early November 2013, Huguely was transferred from the Keen Mountain Correctional Center to River North Correctional Center in Independence, Virginia. The River North facility opened in October 2013, and is a Level 4 facility meant for long-term prisoners. As of December 2016, he was being held at the Augusta Correctional Center in Craigsville. Huguely is currently held at the Beaumont Correctional Center, a level 5 facility, which requires no disruptive behavior for at least past 24 months prior to consideration for a transfer to any less secure facility. His release date is June 17, 2030, at which time he will be 42 years old. He is currently housed at Coffeewood Correctional Center in Mitchells, VA.

=== Wrongful death civil lawsuits ===
On April 26, 2012, Sharon Love filed a wrongful death lawsuit against Huguely, asking for $29.45 million in compensatory damages and $1 million in punitive damages. On May 1, 2012, she filed a $29.45 million wrongful death lawsuit against UVA, men's lacrosse head coach Dom Starsia, associate head coach Marc Van Arsdale, and UVA director of athletics Craig Littlepage, alleging gross negligence on the part of the coaching staff. The suit alleged: “It was well known to the players and coaches on the UVA men's and women's lacrosse teams that Huguely's alcohol abuse and erratic, aggressive behavior was increasingly getting out of control, especially his obsession with Love, and his aggressiveness and threats to Love.” But despite this, no action was taken “to discipline Huguely, to suspend or remove Huguely from the lacrosse team, to refer Huguely for treatment or counseling for alcohol/substance abuse or anger/aggressive behavior management, or to subsequently report Huguely's potential risk of violence, pursuant to the UVA Policy on Preventing and Addressing Threats or Acts of Violence.”

The Love family dropped its suit against UVA and its coaches on July 23, 2013, with no reason given. The wrongful death suit against Huguely was scheduled to go to trial September 29, 2014, but after multiple delays, was pushed back to a trial date of July 30, 2018; ultimately, shortly before the scheduled trial date, the civil suit was dropped (dismissed without prejudice) by Love's family on June 11, 2018.

The Love family refiled its suit against George Huguely in 2018, and a trial began in Charlottesville District Court on April 25, 2022. On May 2, a jury found Huguely liable, and awarded $15 million in compensatory damages, split evenly between Sharon Love and Love's sister, Lexie Love Hodges.

== Aftermath ==
At a May 6, 2010 candlelight vigil, UVA president John T. Casteen III said: “My hope for Yeardley, and for you, is that her dying inspires an anger, a sense of outrage that engenders determination here; and wherever Yeardley's name is recognized, that no woman, no person in this place, this community, this state, our nation need either fear for her safety or experience violence for any reason.” On May 8, 2010, a funeral Mass for Love was held at the Cathedral of Mary Our Queen that was attended by around two thousand people.

On May 10, 2010, UVA women's lacrosse coach Julie Myers explained the team planned to go forward with its role in the NCAA tournament: “Let's do it the way that Yards would want us to do it.” In their respective tournaments, the men's team advanced to the semifinal, and the women's team advanced to the quarterfinal.

=== One Love Foundation established ===
Following her death, UVA retired Love's jersey number 1. Within months of her murder, her family established the One Love Foundation to raise awareness about domestic violence, especially relationship violence.

In 2014, the One Love Foundation released a film titled Escalation that has since become required viewing for student-athletes at a number of universities. Since 2016, the One Love Foundation has collaborated with the National Football League (NFL).

== See also ==
- Clery Act
