= Forge =

Hearth used for heating metals, or workplace containing such a hearth

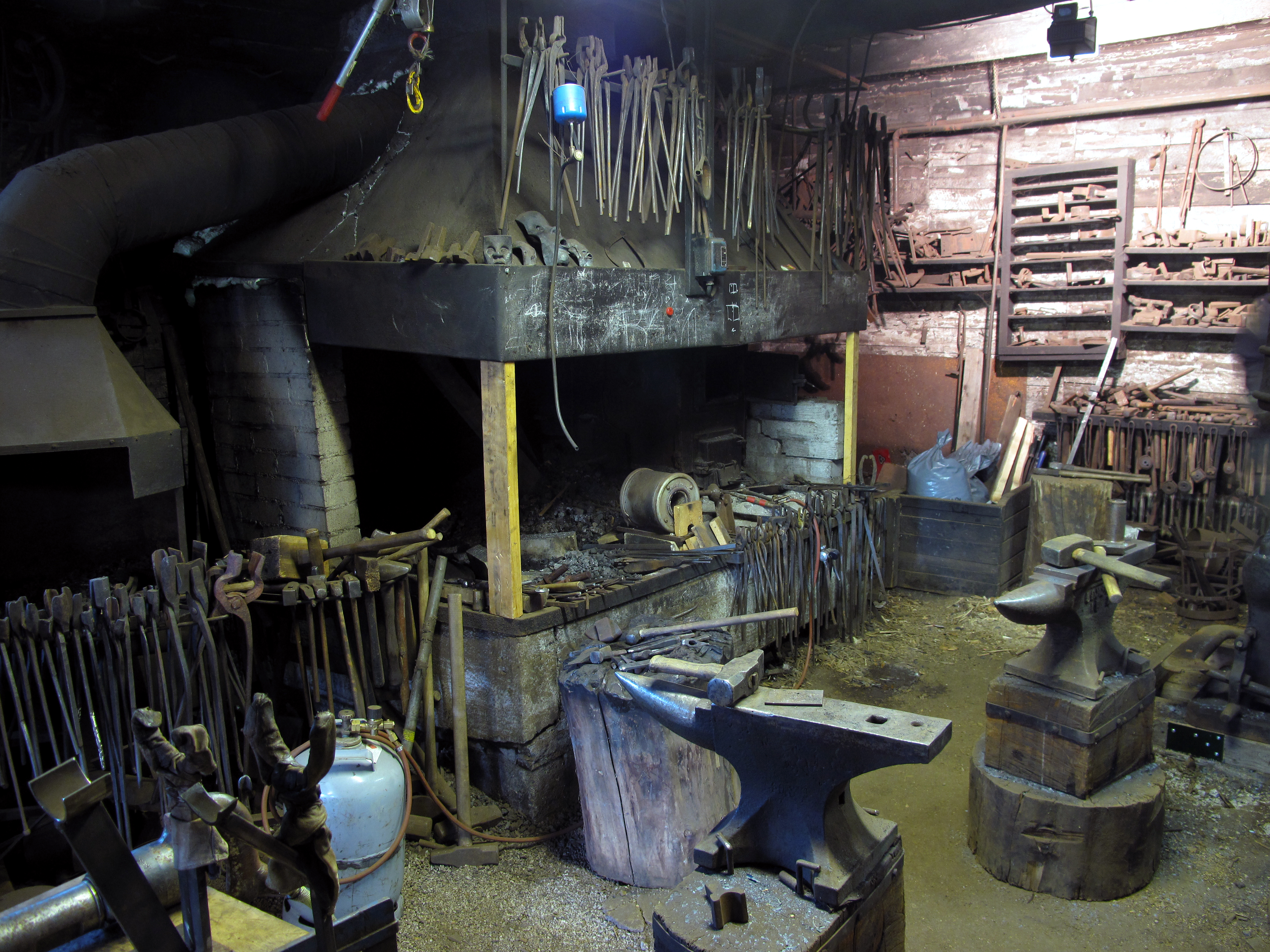
The inside of a typical smithy in Finland

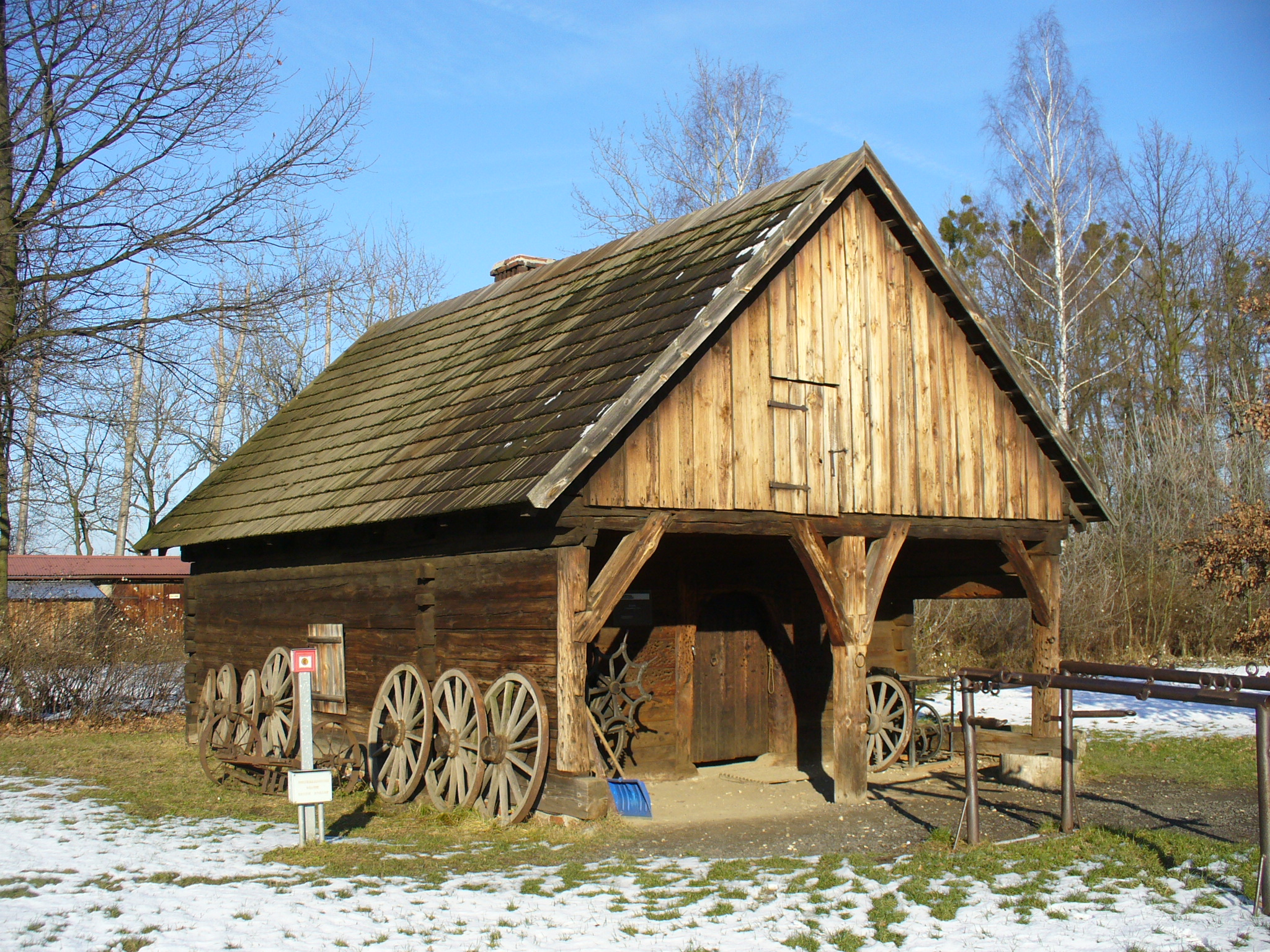
Wooden smithy built in 1726 in Opole, Upper Silesia, Poland

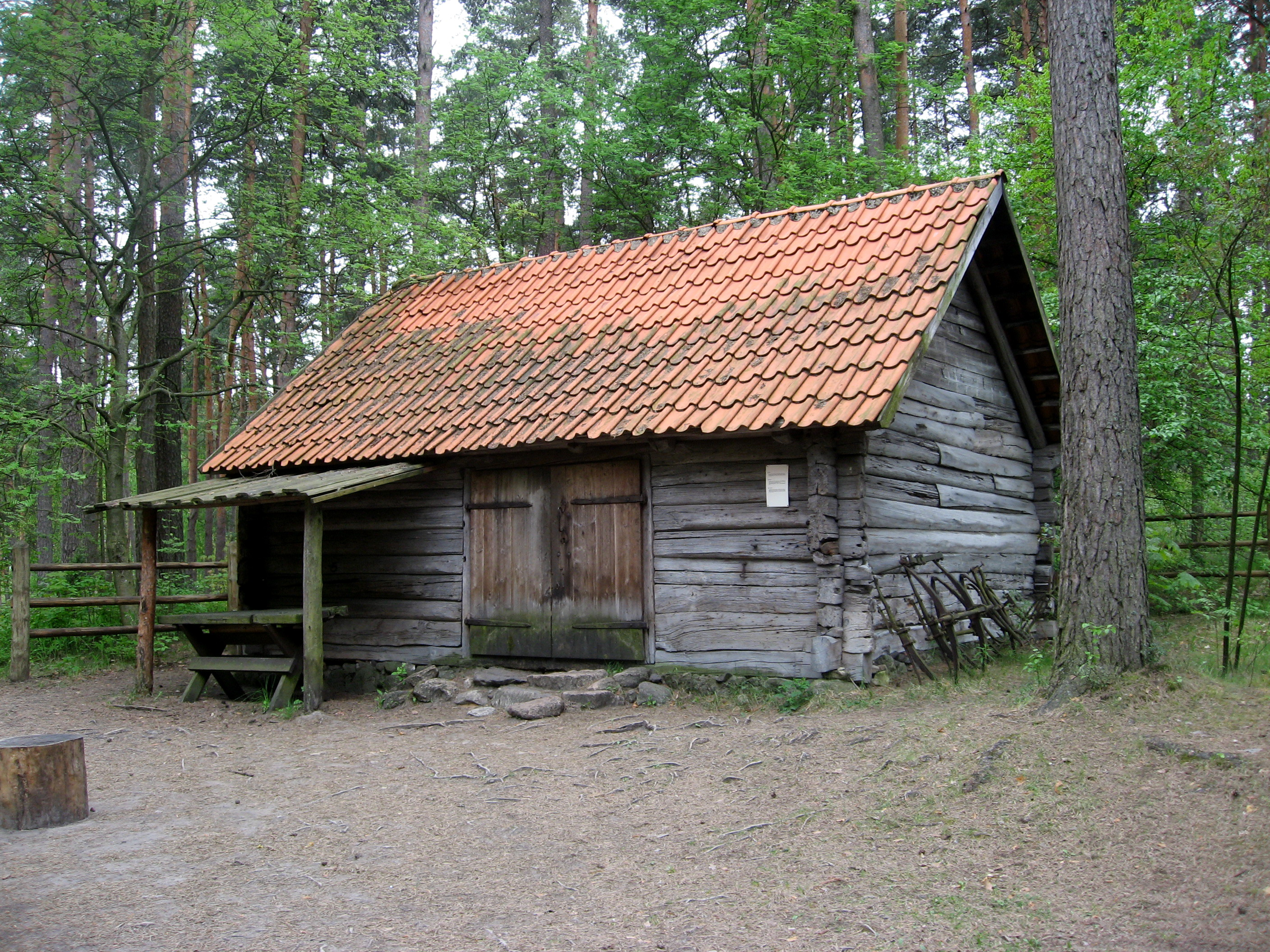
A smithy built around 1880 in Mērsrags, Courland, Latvia currently located at The Ethnographic Open-Air Museum of Latvia

A forge is a type of hearth used for heating metals, or the workplace (smithy) where such a hearth is located. The forge is used by the smith to heat a piece of metal to a temperature at which it becomes easier to shape by forging, or to the point at which work hardening no longer occurs. The metal (known as the "workpiece") is transported to and from the forge using tongs, which are also used to hold the workpiece on the smithy's anvil while the smith works it with a hammer. Sometimes, such as when hardening steel or cooling the work so that it may be handled with bare hands, the workpiece is transported to the slack tub, which rapidly cools the workpiece in a large body of water. However, depending on the metal type, it may require an oil quench or a salt brine instead; many metals require more than plain water hardening. The slack tub also provides water to control the fire in the forge.

== Types ==
=== Coal/coke/charcoal forge ===
Bottom blast coal forge

A forge typically uses bituminous coal, industrial coke or charcoal as the fuel to heat metal. The designs of these forges have varied over time, but whether the fuel is coal, coke or charcoal the basic design has remained the same.

A forge of this type is essentially a hearth or fireplace designed to allow a fire to be controlled such that metal introduced to the fire may be brought to a malleable state or to bring about other metallurgical effects (hardening, annealing, and tempering as examples). The forge fire in this type of forge is controlled in three ways: amount of air, the volume of fuel, and shape of the fuel/fire.

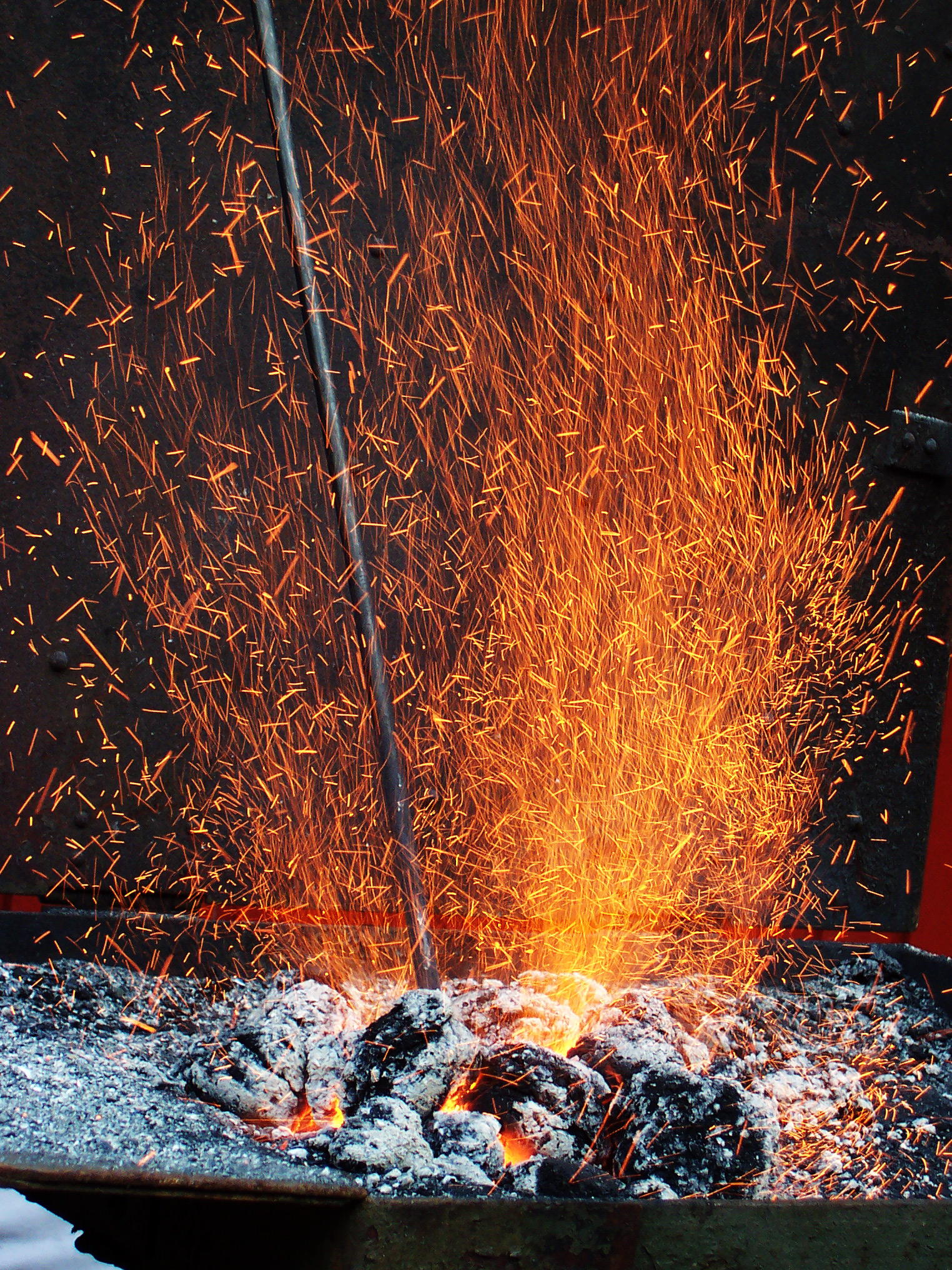
A forge fire for hot working of metal

Over thousands of years of forging, these devices have evolved in one form or another as the essential features of this type of forge:

- Tuyere—a pipe through which air can be forced into the fire
- Bellows or blower—a means for forcing air into the tuyere
- Hearth—a place where the burning fuel can be contained over or against the tuyere opening. Traditionally hearths have been constructed of mud-brick (adobe), fired brick, stone, or later, constructed of iron.

During operation, fuel is placed in or on the hearth and ignited. A source of moving air, such as a fan or bellows, introduces additional air into the fire through the tuyere. With additional air, the fire consumes fuel faster and burns hotter (and cleaner - smoke can be thought of as escaped potential fuel).

A blacksmith balances the fuel and air in the fire to suit particular kinds of work. Often this involves adjusting and maintaining the shape of the fire.

In a typical coal forge, a firepot will be centered in a flat hearth. The tuyere will enter the firepot at the bottom. In operation, the hot core of the fire will be a ball of burning coke in and above the firepot. The heart of the fire will be surrounded by a layer of hot but not burning coke. Around the unburnt coke will be a transitional layer of coal being transformed into coke by the heat of the fire. Surrounding all is a ring or horseshoe-shaped layer of raw coal, usually kept damp and tightly packed to maintain the shape of the fire's heart and to keep the coal from burning directly so that it "cooks" into coke first.

If a larger fire is necessary, the smith increases the air flowing into the fire as well as feeding and deepening the coke heart. The smith can also adjust the length and width of the fire in such a forge to accommodate different shapes of work.

The major variation from the forge and fire just described is a 'backdraft' where there is no fire pot, and the tuyere enters the hearth horizontally from the back wall.

Coke and charcoal may be burned in the same forges that use coal, but since there is no need to convert the raw fuel at the heart of the fire (as with coal), the fire is handled differently.

Individual smiths and specialized applications have fostered the development of a variety of forges of this type, from the coal forge described above to simpler constructions amounting to a hole in the ground with a pipe leading into it.

=== Gas forge ===
A gas forge typically uses propane or natural gas as the fuel. One common, efficient design uses a cylindrical forge chamber and a burner tube mounted at a right angle to the body. The chamber is typically lined with refractory materials such as a hard castable refractory ceramic or a soft ceramic thermal blanket (ex: mineral wool). The burner mixes fuel and air which are ignited at the tip, which protrudes a short way into the chamber lining. The air pressure, and therefore heat, can be increased with a mechanical blower or by taking advantage of the Venturi effect.

Gas forges vary in size and construction, from large forges using a big burner with a blower or several atmospheric burners to forges built out of a coffee can utilizing a cheap, simple propane torch. A small forge can even be carved out of a single soft firebrick.

The primary advantage of a gas forge is the ease of use, particularly for a novice. A gas forge is simple to operate compared to coal forges, and the fire produced is clean and consistent. They are less versatile, as the fire cannot be reshaped to accommodate large or unusually shaped pieces. It is also difficult to heat a small section of a piece. A common misconception is that gas forges cannot produce enough heat to enable forge-welding, but a well-designed gas forge is hot enough for any task.

=== Finery forge ===
A finery forge is a water-powered mill where pig iron is refined into wrought iron.

== Forging equipment ==
=== Anvil ===
The structure of an anvil

The anvil serves as a workbench to the blacksmith, where the metal to be forged is worked. Anvils may seem clunky and heavy, but they are a highly refined tool carefully shaped to suit a blacksmith's needs. Anvils are made of cast or wrought iron with a tool steel face welded on or of a single piece of cast or forged tool steel. Some anvils are made of only cast iron and have no tool steel face. These are not real anvils, and will not serve a blacksmith as such because they are too soft. A common term for a cast iron anvil is "ASO" or "Anvil Shaped Object". The purpose of a tool steel face on an anvil is to provide what some call "rebound" as well as being hard and not denting easily from misplaced hammer blows. The term rebound means it projects some of the force of the blacksmith's hammer blows back into the metal thus moving more metal at once than if there were no rebound. A good anvil can project anywhere from 50 to 99% of the energy back into the workpiece. The flat top, called the "face" is highly polished and usually has two holes (but can have more or less depending on the design). The square hole is called the hardy hole, where the square shank of the hardy tool fits. There are many different kinds of hardy tools. The smaller hole is called the pritchel hole, used as a bolster when punching holes in hot metal, or to hold tools similar to how the hardy tool does, but for tools that require being able to turn a 360-degree angle such as a hold-down tool for when the blacksmith's tongs cannot hold a workpiece as securely as it needs to be. On the front of the anvil, there is sometimes a "horn" that is used for bending, drawing out steel, and many other tasks. Between the horn and the anvil face, there is often a small area called a "step" or a "cutting table" That is used for cutting hot or cold steel with chisels, and hot cut tools without harming the anvil's face. Marks on the face transfer into imperfections in the blacksmith's work.

=== Hammer ===
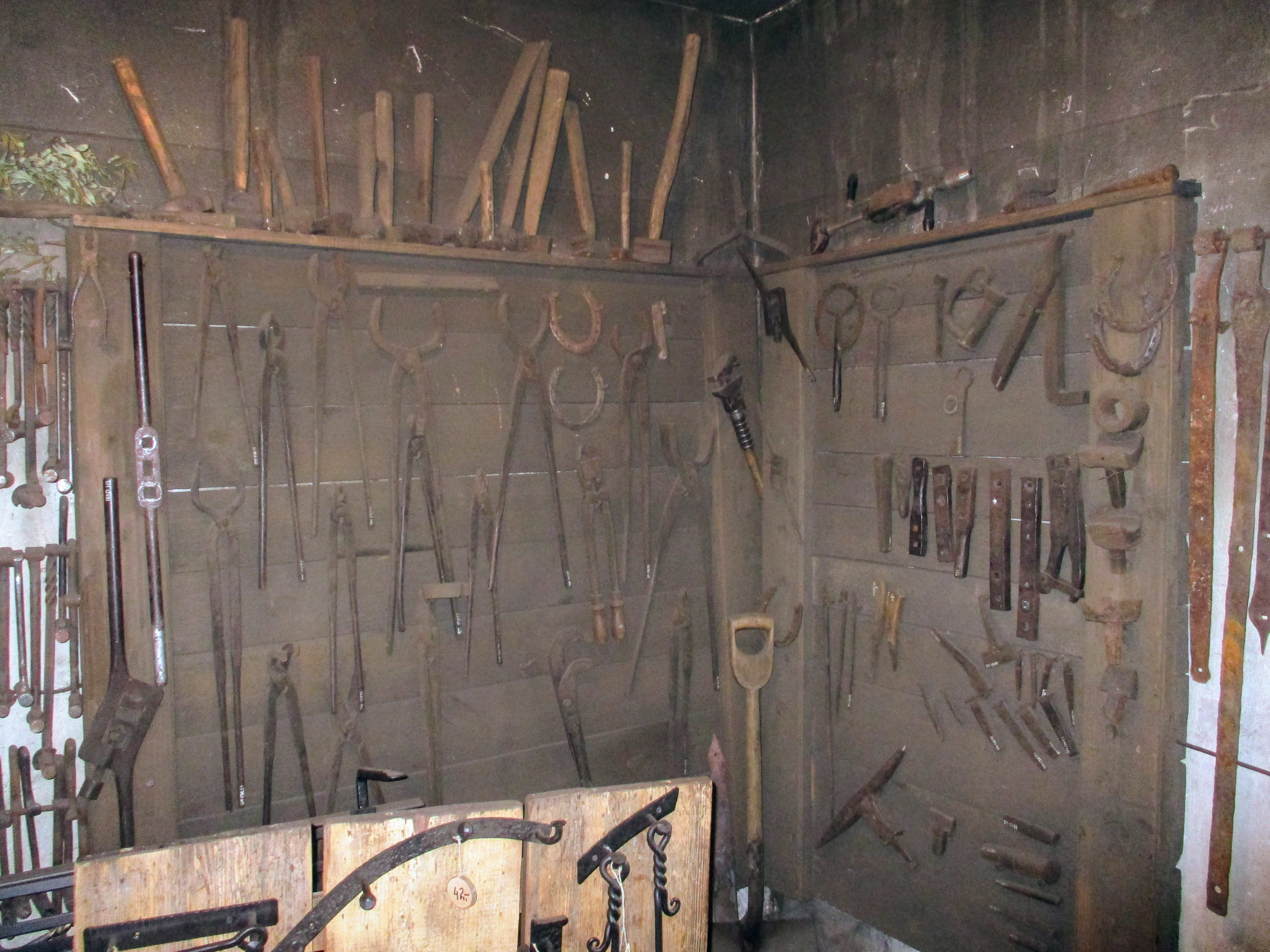
Various traditional blacksmith tools

There are many types of hammer used in a blacksmith's workshop but this will name just a few common ones. Hammers can range in shape and weight from half an ounce to nearly 30 pounds depending on the type of work being done with it.

1. Hand hammer - used by the smith.
  - Ball-peen hammer
  - Cross-peen hammer
  - Straight-peen hammer
  - Rounding hammer
2. Sledge hammer - used by the striker.

=== Chisel ===
Chisels are made of high carbon steel. They are hardened and tempered at the cutting edge while the head is left soft so it will not crack when hammered. Chisels are of two types, hot and cold chisels. The cold chisel is used for cutting cold metals while the hot chisel is for hot metals. Usually, hot chisels are thinner and therefore can not be substituted with cold chisels. Also, many smiths shape chisels as to have a simple twisted handle as to resemble a hammer, they can be used at a greater distance away from the hot metals. They are very useful and found throughout the world.

=== Tongs ===
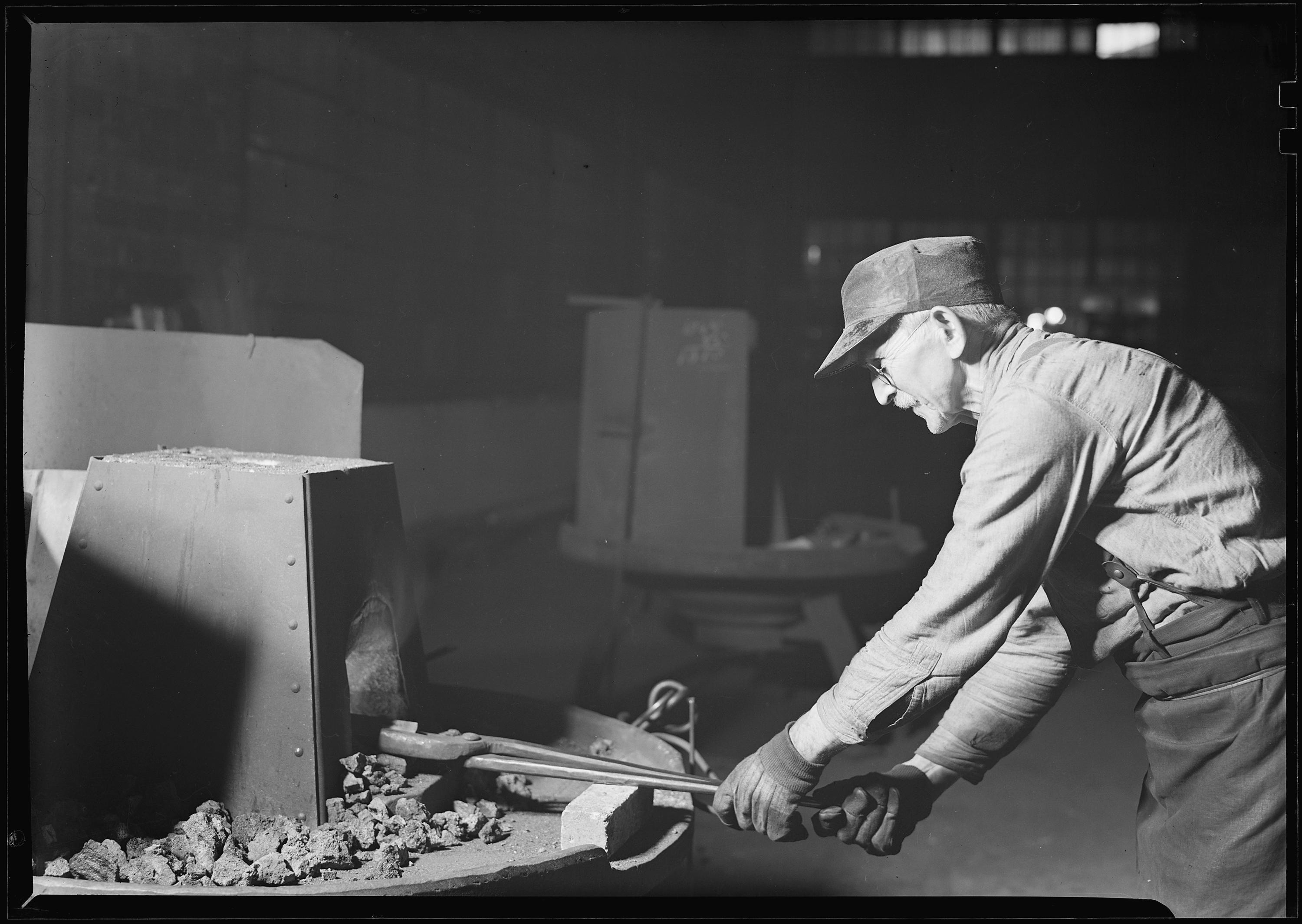
Blacksmith using tongs

Tongs are used by the blacksmith for holding hot metals securely. The mouths are custom made by the smith in various shapes to suit the gripping of various shapes of metal. It is not uncommon for a blacksmith to own twenty or more pairs of tongs; traditionally, a smith would start building their collection during the apprenticeship. There are various types of tongs available in the market. (1) flat tong (2) rivet or ring tong (3) straight lip fluted tong (4) gad tong

=== Fuller ===
Fullers are forming tools of different shapes used in making grooves or hollows. They are often used in pairs, the bottom fuller has a square shank which fits into the hardy hole in the anvil while the top fuller has a handle. The work is placed on the bottom fuller and the top is placed on the work and struck with a hammer. The top fuller is also used for finishing round corners and for stretching or spreading metal.

=== Hardy ===
The hardy tool is a tool with a square shank that fits in a hardy hole. There are many different kinds of hardy tools such as the hot cut hardy, used for cutting hot metal on the anvil; the fuller tool, used for drawing out metal and making grooves; bending jigs - and too many others to list.

=== Slack tub ===
A slack tub is usually a large container full of water used by a blacksmith to quench hot metal. The slack tub is principally used to cool parts of the work during forging (to protect them, or keep the metal in one area from "spreading" for example, nearby hammer blows); to harden the steel; to tend a coal or charcoal forge; and simply to cool the work quickly for easy inspection. In bladesmithing and tool-making the term will usually be changed to a "quench tank" because oil or brine is used to cool the metal. The term slack is believed to derive from the word "slake", as in slaking the heat.

== Types of forging ==
=== Drop forging ===
Drop forging is a process used to shape metal into complex shapes by dropping a heavy hammer with a die on its face onto the workpiece.

==== Process ====
The workpiece is placed into the forge. Then the impact of a hammer causes the heated material, which is very malleable, to conform to the shape of the die and die cavities. Typically only one die is needed to completely form the part. Extra space between the die faces causes some of the material to be pressed out of the sides, forming flash. This acts as a relief valve for the extreme pressure produced by the closing of the die halves and is later trimmed off of the finished part.

==== Equipment ====
The equipment used in the drop forming process is commonly known as a power or drop hammer. These may be powered by air, hydraulics, or mechanics. Depending on how the machine is powered, the mass of the ram, and the drop height, the striking force can be anywhere from 11,000 to 425,000 pounds. The tools that are used, dies and punches, come in many different shapes and sizes, as well as materials. Examples of these shapes are flat and v-shaped which are used for open-die forging, and single or multiple-impression dies used for closed die forging. The designs for the dies have many aspects to them that must be considered. They all must be properly aligned, they must be designed so the metal and the flash will flow properly and fill all the grooves, and special considerations must be made for supporting webs and ribs and the parting line location. The materials must also be selected carefully. Some factors that go into the material selection are cost, their ability to harden, their ability to withstand high pressures, hot abrasion, heat cracking, and other such things. The most common materials used for the tools are carbon steel and, in some cases, nickel-based alloys.

==== Workpiece materials ====
The materials that are used most commonly in drop forging are aluminium, copper, nickel, mild steel, stainless steel, and magnesium. Mild steel is the best choice, and magnesium generally performs poorly as a drop forging material.

== Mythology ==
Various gods and goddesses are associated with the forge in a number of mythologies, such as the Irish Brigid, West African Ogun, Greek Hephaestus and Roman Vulcan.

== See also ==
- Oven
- Kiln
- Furnace
- Clinker (waste)
- Blast furnace
- Crucible steel
- Steel mill
- Steel industry
- Catalan forge
