= Craigsville School =

Historic school building in Virginia, US

- U.S. National Register of Historic Places
- Virginia Landmarks Register
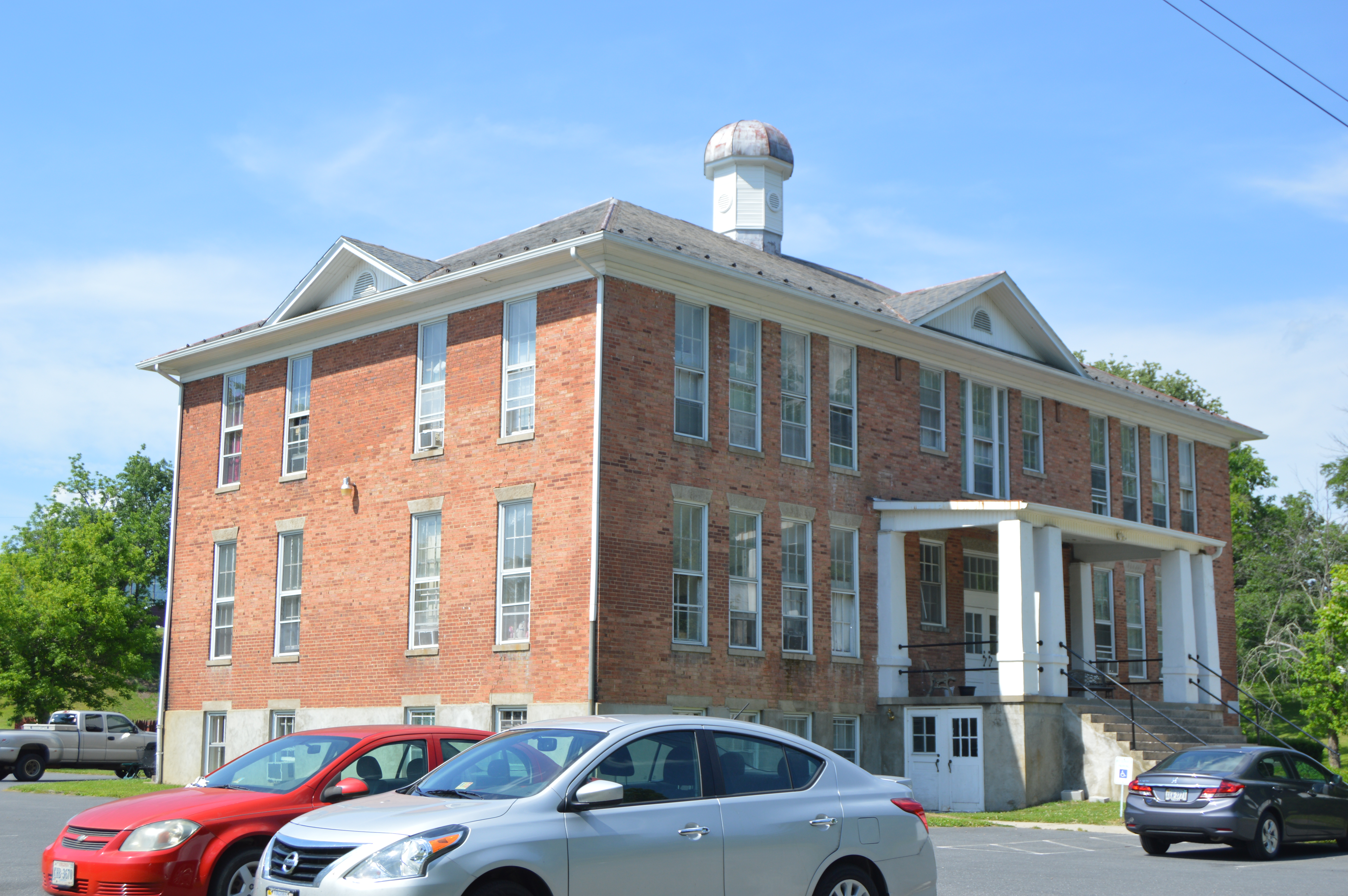
- Front and southwestern side

- Location within Virginia Location within the United States
- Location: Railroad Ave., Craigsville, Virginia
- Coordinates: 38°04′46″N 79°22′47″W
- Area: 1 acre (0.40 ha)
- Built: 1917
- Architectural style: Vernacular Colonial Revival
- MPS: Public Schools in Augusta County Virginia 1870--1940 TR
- NRHP reference No.: 85000383
- VLR No.: 007-1146

Significant dates
- Added to NRHP: February 27, 1985
- Designated VLR: December 11, 1984

Craigsville School, also known as Craigsville Grammar School, is a historic public school building located at Craigsville, Augusta County, Virginia, built in 1917. It is a large, two-story symmetrical rectangular brick building, built in the Colonial Revival style. The school closed in 1968, and was converted to apartments in 1983–1984.

It was listed on the National Register of Historic Places in 1985.

== History and description ==
In the 1910s, Augusta County began consolidating its one- and two-room schools into larger facilities modeled on the square Georgian form. The building lacked a gymnasium and originally housed all grades through high school. In the 1920s, the high school utilized about half of the second floor while the grammar school used all the remaining spaces. "The high-school curriculum proved to be more limited compared to other high schools in the County, with no instruction in agriculture or home economics. Due to the crowded conditions in this school by the late 1920s, the county constructed a new high school in Craigsville in 1932. This older building then became the elementary school and continued in use until 1968. The building remained vacant until 1983–1984 when it was converted into 14 apartments." The remodeling retained much of the original detail and trim.

The school was designed on a full double-pile, central-passage plan. "It features a one-story, wooden entrance portico and original wooden belfry atop the low-pitched hipped roof. Colonial detailing highlights the fairly stylish design. The original one-story wooden portico still frames the central entrance and flanking windows, although its second-floor balustrade has been removed. A similar portico serving the back entrance has been removed. Granite jack arches embellish the tall 6-over-6 sash windows arranged symmetrically around the entire building. Shingled wooden cross gables pierced with fanlights further adorn each of the four sides."
