= Keen Mountain Correctional Center =

Prison in Oakwood, Virginia, United States

- Interactive map of Keen Mountain Correctional Center
- Location: State Route 629, Oakwood, Virginia; 37.22335°N 81.97903°W
- Status: Open
- Security class: Maximum
- Capacity: 1200
- Opened: 1990
- Managed by: Warden: Israel Hamilton
- Director: Joseph Walters

Keen Mountain Correctional Center is a level 4, maximum security correctional facility in Oakwood, Virginia. It opened in 1990 and houses up to 1200 adult male offenders.

== Notable inmates ==
Inmate Name	Register Number	Status	Details
Christopher Bryan Speight	1471716	Serving 5 life sentences without parole.	Perpetrator of the 2010 Appomattox shootings in which he murdered 8 people, including his sister, and her family.
George Wesley Huguely	1458946	Serving a 23-year sentence.	Convicted in the 2010 murder of Yeardley Love, in which Huguely killed her by repeatedly hitting her head against a wall.
Lee Boyd Malvo	1180834	Serving multiple life sentences.	Convicted for his role in the 2002 DC Sniper attacks and sentenced to multiple terms of life imprisonment in both Virginia and Maryland for the murders of ten victims. He was originally sent to Red Onion State Prison, following conviction, but was transferred to Keen Mountain Correctional Center in 2024.
Richard Alden Samuel McCroskey III	1434584	Serving 4 life sentences	Perpetrator of the Farmville murders.
