= Catalan forge =

It refers to the technology and building to obtain iron

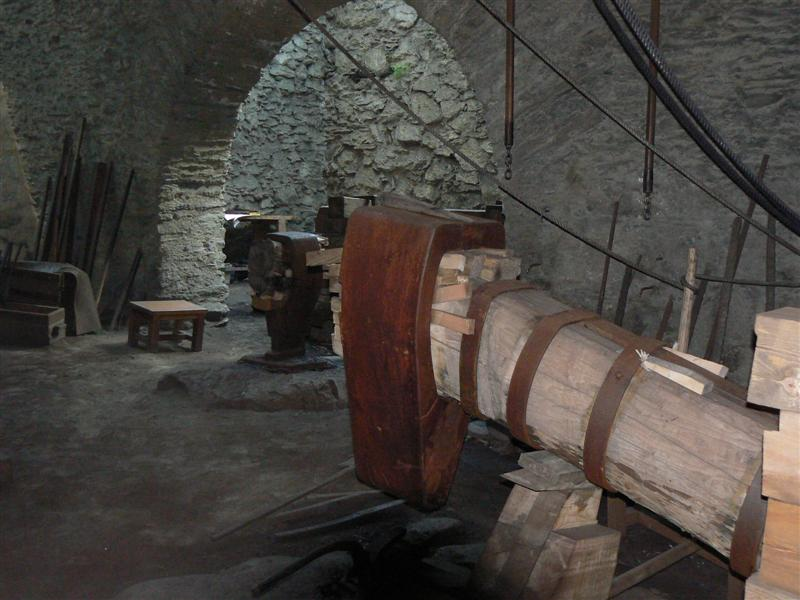
Hammer inside a Catalan forge.

The Catalan forge is a set of technological processes designed to obtain iron by directly reducing the ore—without going through the intermediary of smelting as in a blast furnace—and then shingling the resulting massé. (Note: Massé: iron burr obtained in the furnace after ore reduction.) The Catalan forge employs hydraulic power to operate a hammer or trip hammer, and a ventilation system, known as the trompe, is utilized to maintain the furnace's combustion. The term refers to the technology and building where this activity occurs. Despite its name, this type of forge was used extensively from the 17th to the 19th century in mountainous regions such as the Alps, the Massif Central, and the Pyrenees, as well as by the first American settlers.

== Origin ==
Metallurgy has used rich, easily meltable ores for millennia, including compact brown hematites and decomposed, hydrated carbonates. The ores were placed in circular hearths dug into the ground and constructed from clay in a rudimentary manner. These hearths were fueled by charcoal and activated by two leather bellows. The ores were transformed into a malleable mass of iron, known as a "burr," through the application of heat and pressure. This mass was then beaten with hammers to remove slag and impurities. This was the "hand forge," or "flying forge," constructed where the ore was discovered. When the vein was exhausted or charcoal was in short supply, the metallurgists departed from the site and established their operations elsewhere, leaving behind the crucibles and slag heaps. The consumption of charcoal was a significant contributing factor to the deforestation of the Pyrenees, which in turn gave rise to numerous conflicts, including the War of the Maidens.

The hand forge was a ubiquitous primitive tool. It was gradually understood that river mills, which were used for grinding grain or powering sawmills, could also be used for beating metal. The iron mill gradually supplanted the hand forge with two waterwheels, one of which activated the bellows and the other the hammer. The innovation that would become the most distinctive aspect of Catalan forging appeared in Italy during the early 17th century. This innovation, variously known as the "Pyrenees" or the "Alps" in different regions, reached the French Pyrenees around the midway point of the century and subsequently proliferated throughout the Pyrenean region.

== Tools and features ==
=== The hydraulic trompe ===
Animated diagram of how a traditional trompe operates.

A defining feature of the Catalan forge is the necessity for a relatively elevated head, ranging from 7 to 10 meters. The water is directed into a wooden receptacle, the paicherou, and allowed to flow down a vertical pipe, the shaft. Typically, two shafts are in operation concurrently. The shaft is constructed from a tree trunk bisected and subsequently hollowed out. Subsequently, iron bands are affixed to join the two components. At the upper extremity of the pipe, apertures are created at oblique angles, descending inwards and serving as aspirators. The shaft opening is closed by movable wedges, operated from below, which regulate the water flow. The lower extremity of the shaft culminates in a sizable trapezoidal wooden receptacle designated as the "wind box." The water flows into the wind box, which is directed onto a bench-like structure protected by a stone slab. It then exits the wind box through a sliding door. As the water descends, air is drawn in through the suction tubes, resulting in a mixture of water and air that flows into the box. The pressurized air is then conveyed through a quadrangular duct, designated as the "man or sentinel," and subsequently through a nozzle to the upper portion of the firebox. Consequently, the proboscis offers a permanent and automated solution for the ventilation of the firebox, which can be precisely regulated by varying the flow rate.

=== Foyer ===
A further defining characteristic of the Catalan forge is the blowing over a low, open hearth with a trompe. Thus, the Catalan forge differs from the Stückofen, another highly advanced low furnace of the same period, in that the charge filled the latter's chimney.

The foyer is a quadrangular mass of masonry (comprising clay and large stones), measuring 2.5 to 3 meters in length and 0.70 to 0.90 meters in height. One of its sides is inclined at an angle to the ground. The hearth is positioned at the intersection of two walls. The dimensions of the furnace vary depending on the smith and their specific requirements. The base of the furnace, or hearth, is constructed from a single large slab of granite or gneiss. The stones that support and surround the crucible are frequently grindstones or fragments of old millstones, preventing water or humidity accumulation. The wall on the shorter side of the crucible is arched and has an opening through which the nozzle from the windbox can pass.

The crucible, a pivotal component of the Catalan forge, exhibits distinctive inner surfaces. The front face, designated as the "hand," is situated on the left when observing the crucible from a frontal perspective. The left face, which allows the wind to pass through, is called the porges. The posterior aspect of the crucible is the cellar, while the lateral aspect is the ore or contrevent. The basement is constructed of masonry, while the remaining sides are lined with thick iron plates. The latairol is constructed of two plates, separated by a third plate, the restanque, which serves as a fulcrum for the workers' levers, facilitating the lifting of the massé. As mentioned earlier, the plates are affixed to one another by a horizontal crosspiece. This plie is supported by robust structures on either side, frequently comprising substantial stones and an antiquated hammerhead.

=== Hammer ===
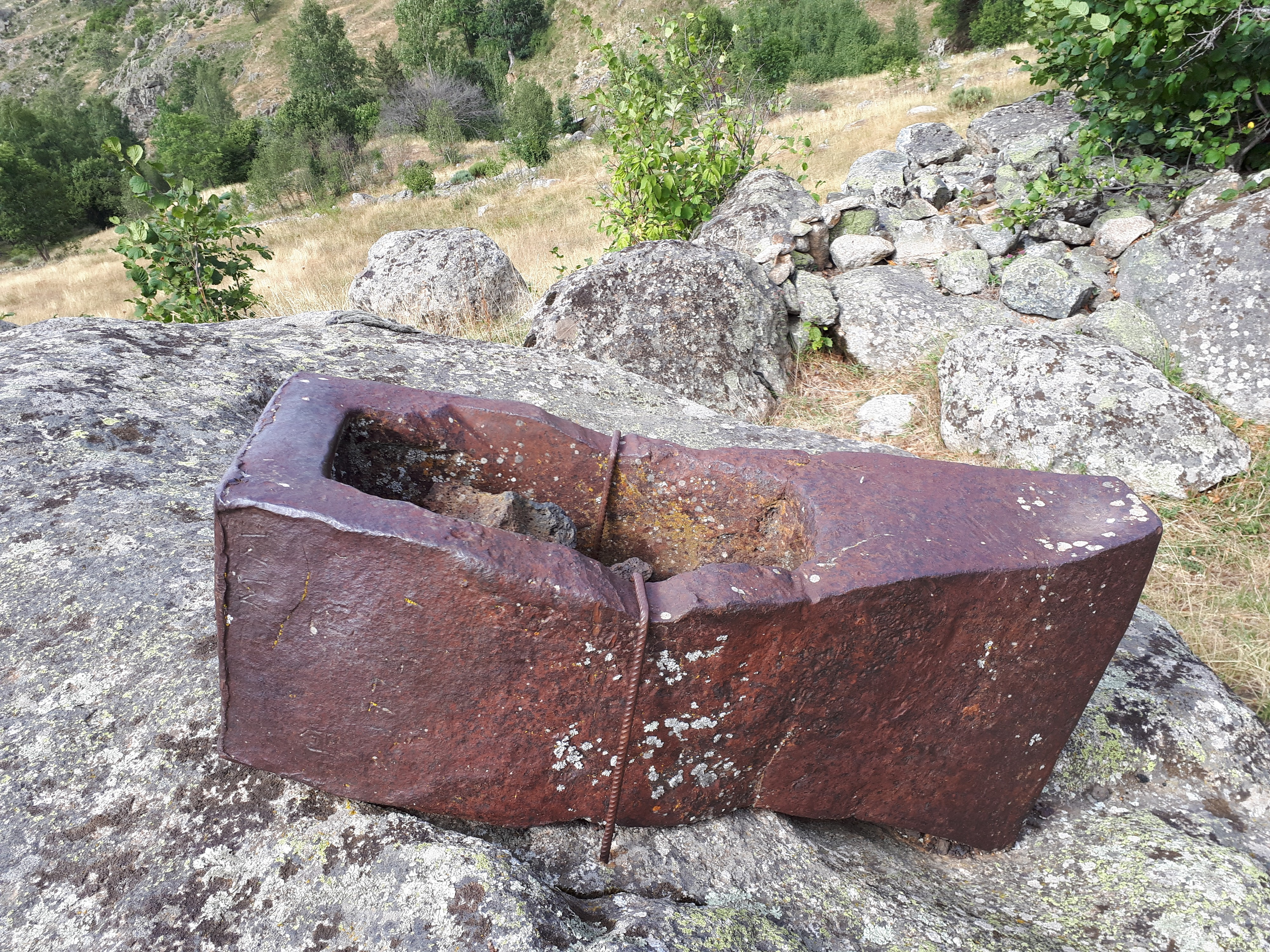
Hammer from an old forge, dated 1774, at the foot of the village of Mantet, Pyrénées-Orientales.

The hammer utilized to strike the massé represents the primary tool employed by the forge. A hydraulic wheel drives the hammer. The wheel is affixed to a cylindrical wooden axle, with cams protruding from its circumference. The cams are designed to grip the tail of the hammer, (Note: It is therefore a terminal swift, also known as a “toggle swift”.) which is positioned perpendicularly and movable vertically on an axle. The hammer is elevated until the cam releases its grip and falls back. At this juncture, the subsequent cam advances to initiate a repetition of the process, as mentioned earlier. The anvil, the point at which the hammer headlands, is fitted with a removable metal pile in its center, which can be changed according to the nature of the work in progress. Similarly, the hammerhead is a heavy metal mass, but its lower part—the part that comes into contact with the hammerhead—is also removable. The cadence of the hammer blows is regulated by varying the rate of fall on the wheel.

== Layout of the forge ==
=== Construction ===
The forge is situated on a watercourse with an adequate flow rate, sufficient elevation, and convenient accessibility, given the necessity for transporting ore, coal, and finished products, typically by mule. The advent of the horn prompted the relocation or upgrading of existing forges, contingent on their geographical positioning. (Note: See article Forges de la vallée de l'Ouzom (in French))

The stream is channeled and directed to two paicherous: one feeds the trompe, and the other is the paddlewheel that drives the swift(s). The water flow can be regulated by opening or closing the relevant valves. The interior of the forge consists of multiple sections, one of which is designated for the hammers. The hammer, or malh (actually a swift), is the critical tool used to shape the mass of raw iron (the 'massé'), transforming it into refined bars or its final shape before shipment.

The wind box, strategically situated at the base of the horn, is a crucial component that ensures the furnace's efficiency. A wall through which the tuyere passes separates it from the furnace. The various rooms or compartments are responsible for the reception and distribution of the raw materials, namely ores, coal, and finished iron. Additionally, workers can be allocated a designated area during their designated rest periods.

=== Staff ===
In principle, the forge is staffed by a brigade of eight workers.

- Four masters are responsible for the following areas: the foyer, the maillé, and two escolas. The foyer is responsible for overseeing the operation of the forge. The maillé, or hammer-maker, is to supervise the iron's mechanical work and the hammer's operationmaillé, or hammer-maker, is to oversee the iron's mechanical work and the hammer's operation. The escolas are responsible for managing the fire and wind.
- Four "valets" assist the blacksmiths, crushing the ore with the hammer.
- A "garde-forge" procures raw materials, ore, and coal.
- A "clerk" is responsible for the oversight of supplies, orders, and accounting.

=== Production ===
An iron magnifier weighs approximately 125 kilograms. Consequently, a well-coordinated team can operate the device manually. (Note: By comparison, a stückofen magnifier weighs between 200 and 350 kg and has to be divided into two stücks before it can be processed.) The production of this magnifying glass requires five hours of shingling and forging before it can be transformed into a marketable iron product.

== Geographical distribution ==
- Pyrénées-Orientales
- Ariège
- Pyrénées-Atlantiques
- Andorra

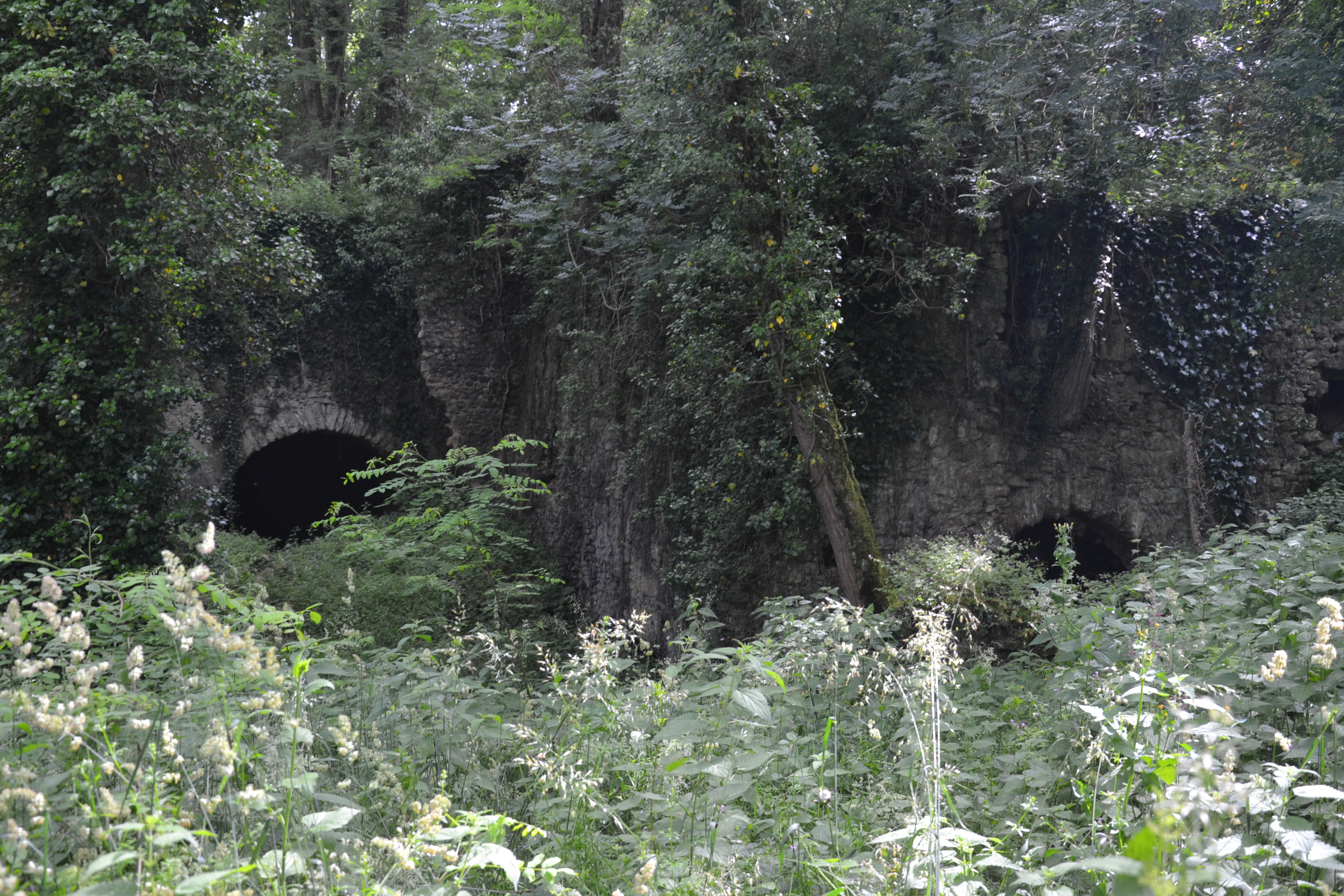
The Queille forges, near Saint-Quentin-la-Tour (Ariège).

In France, the numerous modest rural metallurgical facilities reliant on the Catalan forge, which had persisted despite the advent and enhancements of blast furnaces, ultimately ceased to exist at the advent of the 20th century, when the Thomas process was perfected. This process was responsible for the remarkable expansion of the Lorraine steel industry. Before the Franco-Prussian War of 1870, the two departments of Meurthe and Moselle collectively produced 1.4% of France's steel output. By 1913, Thomas Steel, produced exclusively in Meurthe-et-Moselle, accounted for 69% of the nation's total steel production. This trend was also accentuated by the significant advancement in transportation methods, which enabled manufactured goods to be delivered to distant locations from their point of production.

The initial American settlers refined the cast iron they produced using the Catalan forge, a relatively simple construction compared to blast furnaces and their associated forges. This process was employed in the southern United States until the mid-nineteenth century.

== Disappearance ==
Catalan forges disappear in the Ariège Pyrenees
Year	In operation	Production (quintals) 48,951 kg	Iron price (Fr/Qt)
1843	52	59 753	47,25
1847	46	53 044	42,52
1850	48	55 000	35,50
1853	55	72 125	38,00
1857	45	51 450	36,25
1860	30	43 000	34
1863	19	29 600	33
1867	15	16 700	30
1873	6	3 300	26,91
1875	6	1 800	34

The growth and subsequent decline of the Catalan forges had a notable influence on the price of charcoal. At the zenith of the process, the price of wood rose considerably: from 1833 to 1842, the cost per quintal increased from 7.50 to 9-10 francs. As production declined, the price also fell. In 1854-1855, it was sold for 8 francs, but by 1868, it was worth only 6.10 francs, and by 1872, it was worth 6.80 francs, despite the high inflation rate.

== See also ==
- Forge

== Bibliography ==
- Verna, Catherine (2002). Le Temps des moulines. Fer, technique et société dans les Pyrénées centrales (xiiie – xvie siècles) (in French). Paris: Publications de la Sorbonne. doi:10.4000/medievales.1033.
- Cantelaube, Jean (2005). La forge à la catalane dans les Pyrénées ariégeoises. Une industrie à la montagne (xviie – xixe siècle) (in French). Toulouse: Presses universitaires du Midi. doi:10.4000/books.pumi.37921. ISBN 978-2-912025-17-3.
- Codina, Olivier (2005). "Marchés sidérurgiques et forges : les espaces du fer andorran (1600-1876)". Annales du Midi: Revue archéologique, historique et philologique de la France méridionale (in French). 117 (251). Privat: 383–405. doi:10.3406/anami.2005.7506.
- Grüner, Emmanuel-Louis (1878). Traité de métallurgie — métallurgie générale (in French). Paris: Dunod.
- Levainville, Jacques (1922). L'Industrie du Fer en France (in French). Paris: Armand Colin.
- Durfee, William F. (1890). American Industries since Columbus. Popular Science Monthly. Vol. 38. D. Appleton and Company.
- Strassburger, Julius H. (1969). Blast Furnace-theory and Practice. Gordon and Breach Science Publishers. ISBN 9780677104201.
- Armengaud, A. (1953). La fin des forges catalanes dans les Pyrénées ariégeoises. Annales. Economies, sociétés, civilisations (in French). Vol. 8. Armand Colin. pp. 62–66. doi:10.3406/ahess.1953.2134.
- Richard, Tom (1838). Études sur l'art d'extraire immédiatement le fer de ses minerais sans convertir le métal en fonte (in French). Paris: L. Mathias. pp. from 162 to the end.
- Jules, François (1843). Recherches sur le gisement et le traitement direct des minerais de fer dans les Pyrénées et particulièrement dans l'Ariège (in French). Paris: LIBRAIRES DES CORPS ROYAUX DES PONTS ET CHAUSSÉES ET DES MINES.
