= Farmville murders =

2009 quadruple homicide in Virginia

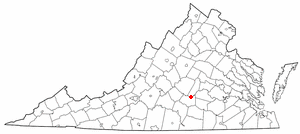
- Location of Farmville in the U.S. state of Virginia.
- Location: 37°17.7971′N 78°24.0735′W; 505 First Avenue; Farmville, Virginia, United States
- Date: September 2009
- Attack type: Quadruple homicide
- Weapons: Ball-peen hammer and splitting maul
- Deaths: Mark Niederbrock (age 50); Debra Kelley (age 53); Emma Niederbrock (age 16); Melanie Wells (age 18)
- Perpetrator: Richard Samuel McCroskey (age 20)

The Farmville murders occurred in Farmville, Virginia, in September 2009 – the quadruple bludgeoning homicide of Mark Niederbrock, Debra Kelley, their daughter Emma Niederbrock and friend Melanie Wells.

Emma Niederbrock shared an online friendship with Richard Alden Samuel McCroskey III, a troubled aspiring rapper who travelled from California. Together, Emma, McCroskey, Emma's parents and Wells attended a concert the week before. When Wells' mother could not locate her daughter, she alerted police, who discovered the murders.

McCroskey, 20 years old, was subsequently arrested, convicted of the murders and sentenced to life in prison.

== The murders ==
The murders took place at Debra Kelley's home, where Kelley lived with her daughter Emma Niederbrock. The bodies were found just after 3:00 p.m. on September 18, 2009, the victims having been bludgeoned to death with a ball-peen hammer and splitting maul. Three bodies were found in a downstairs bedroom and one in a room upstairs.

According to police, Emma's parents, Debra Kelley and Mark Niederbrock, had taken her and her friends Melanie Wells and Richard McCroskey to a horrorcore concert, the Strictly for the Wicked Festival, in Southgate, Michigan days before the killings.

Prince Edward County Commonwealth's Attorney James Ennis said McCroskey's anger over his failing relationship with Emma and text messages she had sent while they were in Michigan led to the killings. After the four returned to Virginia, McCroskey became increasingly distraught about the relationship, as he had an expectation that he and Emma were seeing each other exclusively and was unhappy with how things were going.

Early the next morning, McCroskey attacked the three female victims in the house as they were sleeping and killed each within a short period of time around 3 a.m., according to Ennis. He stated that McCroskey first killed Wells, who was on a sofa in a first-floor den, then Kelley in an upstairs room, and finally Emma in her downstairs bedroom. He struck each victim multiple times with the maul. "No one awoke," Ennis said, adding that the victims had no defensive wounds. Mark Niederbrock arrived at the home three days later, about 5 p.m. on September 17, and McCroskey fatally attacked him with the maul in a living room before moving Mark and Wells' bodies into Emma's room, and attempted to clean up the bloody den.

At some point, McCroskey used a digital camera to record a video of himself, in which he indicated that he knew he had to pay for what he had done and contemplated suicide.

A press release was issued to the public at the time of the murders, and an e-mail was sent to Longwood University students. The following Monday, the Attorney General and the Town of Farmville Police Department held a press conference where the bodies were identified.

== Victims ==
Rev. Mark Alan Niederbrock was a pastor at a Presbyterian church in Hixburg in northern Appomattox County, and father of 16-year-old Emma Niederbrock. Niederbrock had been heading Walker's Presbyterian Church for the past six years. Born in Illinois, Niederbrock was an Eagle Scout and graduate of the University of Illinois. Before he entered the ministry he worked as a graphic designer. Niederbrock and his wife Debra Kelley had been divorced for about nine months.

Dr. Debra Sue Kelley was a 53-year-old associate professor of sociology and criminal justice studies at Longwood University. Dr. Kelley was a mentor to many students during her tenure, many of whom entered proud careers in law enforcement, fire/rescue, and associated fields as practitioners of the subjects she taught. Her memorial can be visited in the northwest grounds of Ruffner Hall adjacent to High Street.

Emma Kelley Niederbrock was Mark Niederbrock's and Debra Kelley's 16-year-old daughter and an online friend of Richard McCroskey, the convicted murderer. She had been homeschooled since middle school.

Melanie Grace Wells was the 18-year-old daughter of Thomas G. Wells Jr. and Kathleen Wells, of Inwood, West Virginia, and Emma Niederbrock's friend. Wells and her family moved to West Virginia from Louisville, Kentucky, just before Wells was to enter high school. Wells dropped out and was studying for her high school equivalency diploma. She attended Musselman High School. Wells had been staying with Emma Niederbrock and Emma's mother.

== Perpetrator ==
Richard McCroskey
- Born: Richard Alden Samuel McCroskey III; December 26, 1988 (age 37)
- Other names: Syko Sam, LiLdEmOnDoG
- Occupations: Amateur horrorcore rapper and graphic designer
- Status: Currently serving four life sentences
- Motive: Romantic rejection
- Conviction: Guilty
- Criminal charge: Four counts of murder
- Penalty: Life in prison

Richard Alden Samuel McCroskey III (born December 26, 1988) had been a graphic designer and amateur horrorcore rapper. He had been living with his father and 21-year-old sister in Castro Valley, California. McCroskey and his sister had been raised in Hayward, California before moving to Castro Valley.

In high school, McCroskey had been teased and harassed because of his weight and red hair. Neighbors described him as a loner. His sister Sarah recalled him as a mild-mannered and kind person who wouldn't fight back when bullied and never reacted badly to anything without provocation. McCroskey's MySpace page featured songs he authored with violent lyrics, dealing with subjects including mutilation, death and the thrill of murder.

After dropping out of Tennyson High School in Hayward, McCroskey attended Hayward High School for a period of time before again dropping out. About five months prior to the murders, McCroskey had been devastated when his father asked their mother to move out. He was excited for a planned trip to Virginia to see friend Emma Niederbrock, whom he had dated online for almost a year and spoken with almost daily by phone. He flew to Virginia on September 6, 2009.

== Investigation, arrest and conviction ==
Prior to discovering the murders, Melanie Wells' mother had called police asking them to check on her daughter. Each time Melanie Wells' mother had called the Kelley home and spoken with Richard McCroskey, McCroskey had given her a different story.

When police arrived at the Kelley home, McCroskey answered the door and told police Wells was at the movies with a friend. The police left, and when Melanie Wells' mother called police again they went to the house and discovered the bodies.

By that time, McCroskey had fled, stealing and wrecking Mark Niederbrock's 2000 Honda. Unaware of the murders, a deputy issued him a summons for driving without a license but did not arrest him. Prince Edward Sheriff's Sgt. Stuart Raybold said at the time there was no reason for the deputy to be suspicious. During this time, McCroskey made a call to confess he had just killed the victims.

McCroskey was apprehended at Richmond International Airport on September 19, where police found him sleeping in the baggage claim area, about to fly back to California. McCroskey, who had no prior criminal record, was first charged with first degree murder, robbery and grand larceny (stealing the car), but later was charged with six counts of capital murder. McCroskey was subsequently held in Piedmont Regional jail, on suicide watch.

Police concluded the victims died from blunt force trauma to the head. Police occult expert Don Rimer, brought in because of symbols found in the music the teens listened to, described the murder scene as a slaughter house.

McCroskey did not initially cooperate with police after his arrest.

The police took McCroskey's computer, house phones and more than a dozen paper bags full of evidence from his home. McCroskey was charged with six counts of capital murder per Virginia criminal law.

On September 20, 2010, facing a death sentence, McCroskey pleaded guilty to two counts of capital murder and two counts of first-degree murder, and received four sentences of life imprisonment. Commonwealth's Attorney James Ennis says that the victims' families supported his decision to reach a plea agreement instead of going to trial and seeking the death penalty.

As of 2026, he is serving his sentence at Keen Mountain Correctional Center, a maximum security prison in Oakwood, Virginia.
