= Augusta Correctional Center =

Prison in Virginia, US

Coordinates: 38°03′33″N 79°21′57″W

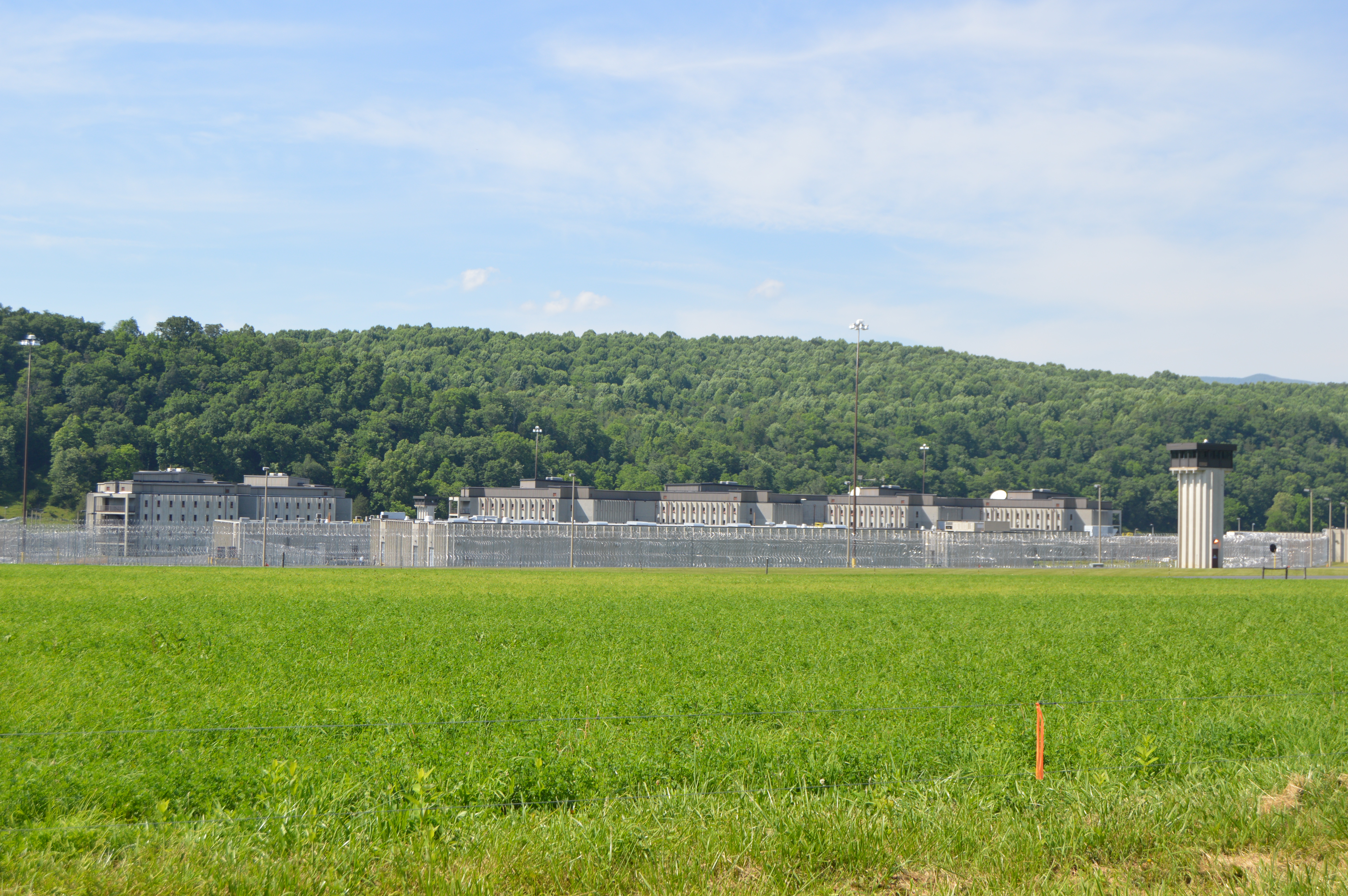
- Interactive map of Augusta Correctional Center
- Location: 1821 Estaline Valley Road Craigsville, Virginia
- Status: Closed
- Security class: Close
- Capacity: 1,222
- Opened: 1986
- Closed: July 1, 2024
- Managed by: Virginia Department of Corrections

The Augusta Correctional Center was a state prison for men located near Craigsville in Augusta County, Virginia, United States.

Owned and operated by the Virginia Department of Corrections, the facility opened in 1986 and had a working capacity of 1,222 prisoners held at a level 3 security level. Inmates must have no disruptive behavior for 2 years to be considered to be transferred to a less secure facility.

== Planned Closure ==
In December 2023, VADOC announced that Augusta Correctional Center, along with three other state correctional facilities, would be permanently closed effective July 1, 2024. Reasons cited for the closure included the difficulty in hiring and retaining new employees to fill vacancies at the prison. VADOC estimated that Augusta was spending over one million dollars annually on employee overtime. There were also concerns about the safety of staff in light of the low number of employees, as the reduced workforce could lead to increased risks of incidents and inadequate supervision of inmates.

Reports indicate that the prison site was under contract for purchase in April 2026.

== Notable prisoners ==
- Montie Rissell, serial killer
- Anthony Briley, one of the Briley Brothers
