= Ball-peen hammer =

Type of hammer used in metalworking

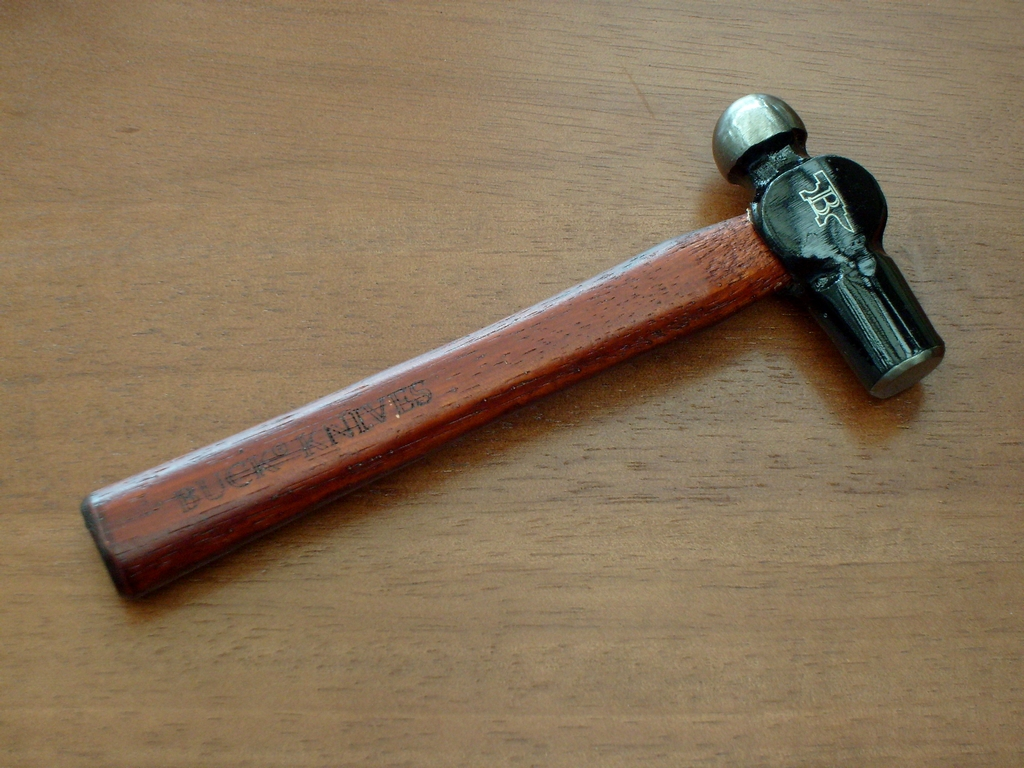
Example of a hard-faced ball-peen hammer

A ball-peen (also ball-pein) or machinist's hammer is a type of peening hammer used in metalworking. It has two heads, one flat and the other, called the peen, rounded.

== Etymology ==
In the word "ball-peen", peen, probably comes from a North Germanic source; compare dialectal Norwegian penn ("peen"), Danish pind ("peg"), German Pinne ("the peen of a hammer"), Old Swedish pæna ("to pound iron with a hammer").

== Uses ==
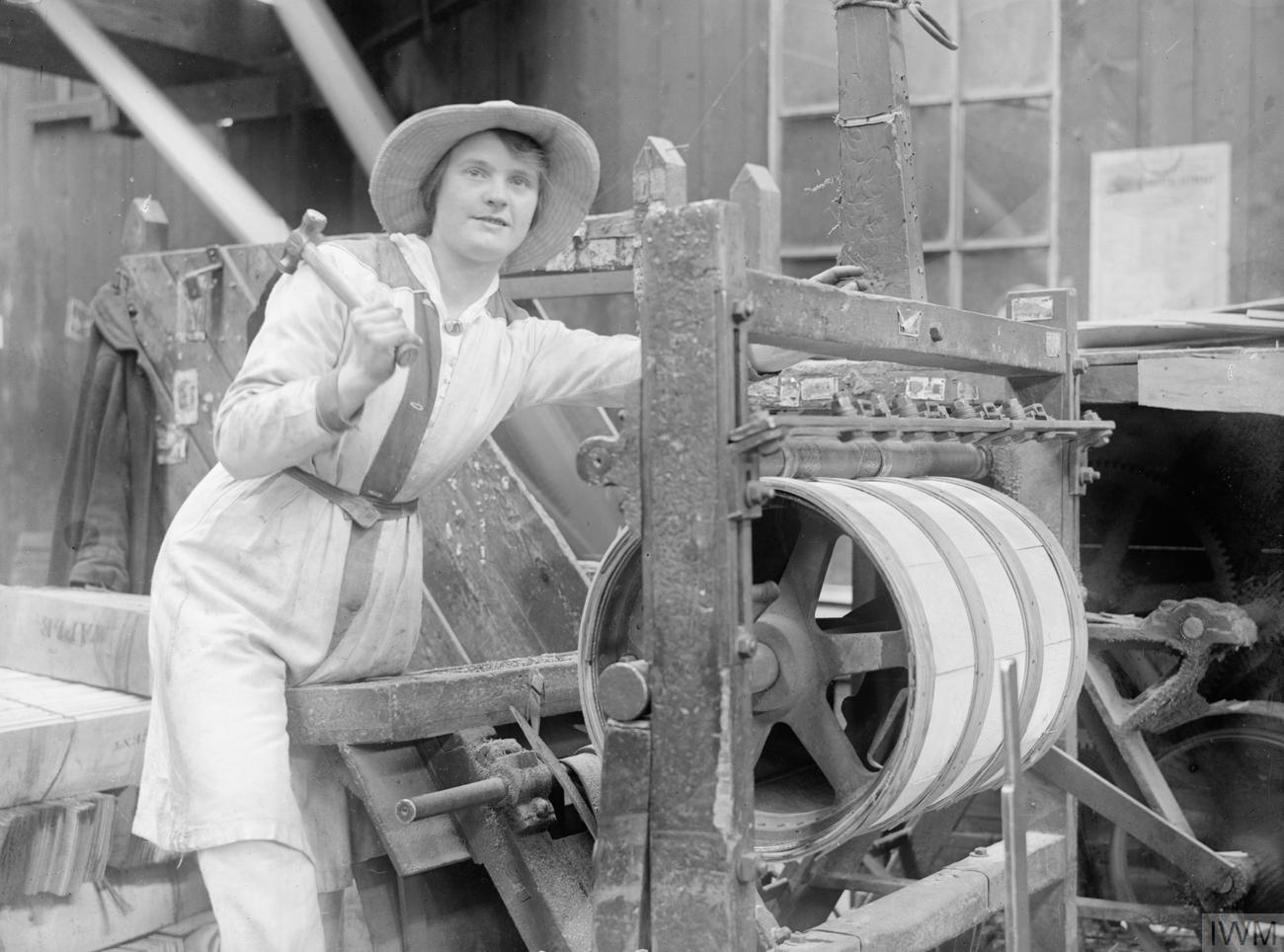
A cooper using a ball-peen hammer to construct a cask in September 1918

Besides peening (surface-hardening by impact), the ball-peen hammer is useful for many tasks, such as striking punches and chisels (usually performed with the flat face of the hammer). The peening face or ball face is useful for rounding off edges of metal pins and fasteners, such as rivets. It can also be used to make gaskets for mating surfaces: a suitable gasket material is held over the surface that needs a gasket, and the operator lightly taps around the edges of the mating surface to perforate the gasket material.

== Crime ==
The ball peen hammer has been described as “the favourite weapon” of the Hells Angels. It was also the weapon used by Peter Sutcliffe, dubbed the Yorkshire Ripper, an allusion to the Victorian serial killer Jack the Ripper, to murder at least 13 women and attack a further possible nine.

A ball peen hammer, along with a splitting maul, were the weapons used by 20-year old Richard Samuel McCroskey to murder 4 people in Farmville, Virginia.

== Variants ==
Variants include the straight-peen, diagonal-peen, and cross-peen hammer. Instead of a ball-shaped head, these hammers have a wedge-shaped head. The straight-peen hammer has a wedge oriented parallel to the hammer's handle. The cross-peen hammer's wedge is oriented perpendicular to the handle. The head of a diagonal-peen hammer, as the name implies, has a wedge set at a 45° angle from the handle; it can be a left angle or a right angle, and some peen hammers have a double diagonal wedge for ergonomic reasons. They are commonly used by blacksmiths during the forging process to deliver blows for forging or to strike other forging tools.

== Head materials ==
Ball-peen hammer heads are typically made of heat treated forged high-carbon steel or alloy steel; it is harder than the face of a claw hammer. Softer brass heads are sometimes used.

== Bibliography ==
- Benford, Tom (2006). Garage and Workshop Gear Guide. MotorBooks/MBI. ISBN 0-7603-2312-7.
- Sher, Julian; Marsden, William (2006). Angels of Death: Inside the Bikers' Empire of Crime. Toronto: Alfred Knopf Canada. ISBN 9780307370327.
