= Craigsville, Virginia =

- Town
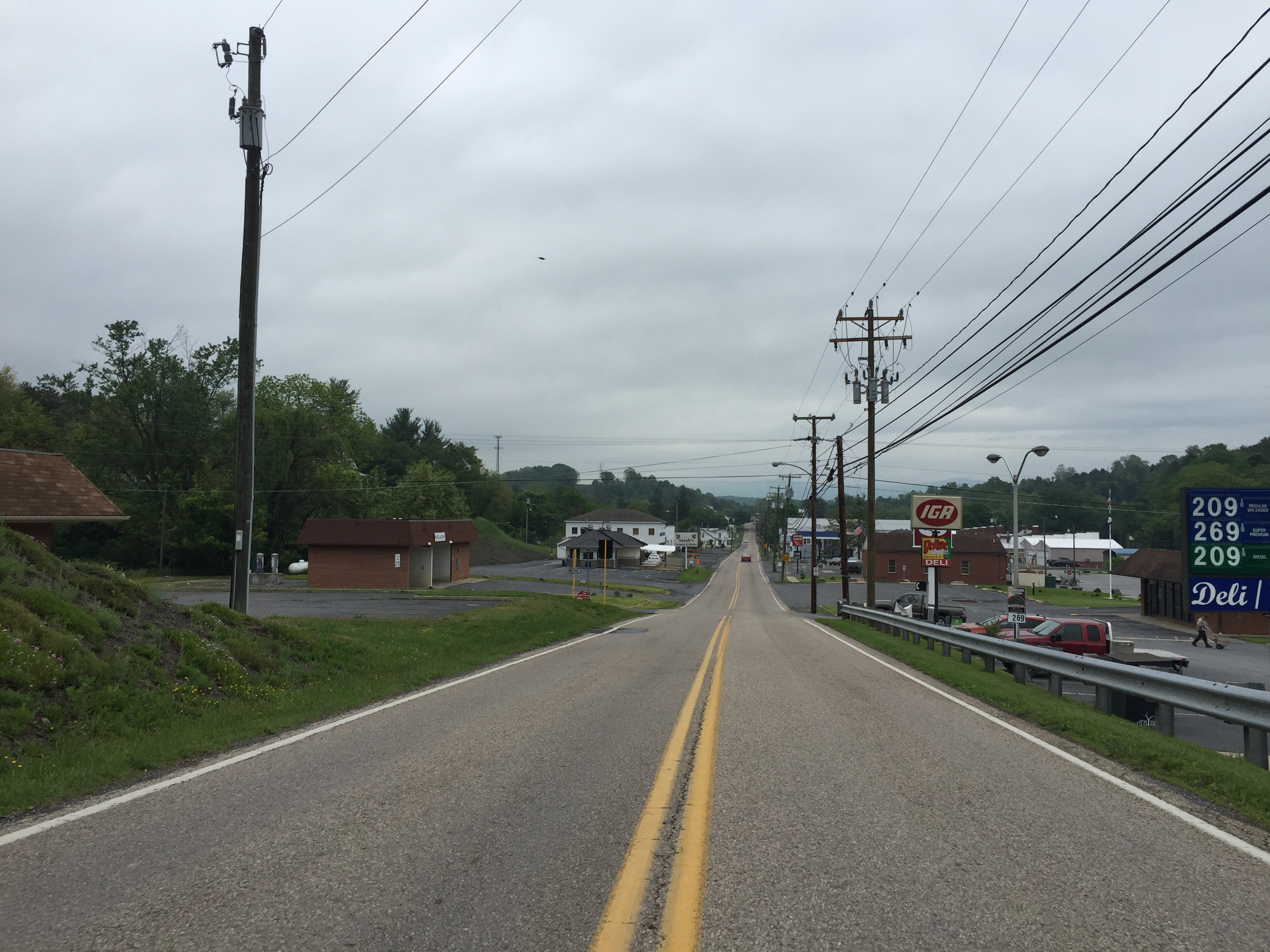
- SR 42 in Craigsville

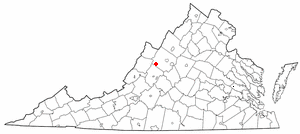
- Location of Craigsville, Virginia
- Coordinates: 38°4′46″N 79°22′52″W
- Country: United States
- State: Virginia
- County: Augusta

Area
  - Total: 2.07 sq mi (5.35 km^{2})
  - Land: 2.07 sq mi (5.35 km^{2})
  - Water: 0 sq mi (0.00 km^{2})
- Elevation: 1,529 ft (466 m)

Population (2020)
  - Total: 899
  - Estimate (2019): 931
  - Density: 450.5/sq mi (173.94/km^{2})
- Time zone: UTC-5 (Eastern (EST))
  - Summer (DST): UTC-4 (EDT)
- ZIP Code: 24430
- Area code: 540
- FIPS code: 51-19904
- GNIS feature ID: 1492819
- Website: http://www.craigsville.us

Craigsville is a town in Augusta County, Virginia, United States. As of the 2020 census, Craigsville had a population of 899. It is part of the Staunton–Waynesboro Micropolitan Statistical Area.

== History ==
The Craigsville School was listed on the National Register of Historic Places in 1985.

The history of Craigsville can be traced back to 1721 when a Scotch-Irish couple, William and Jeanette Craig, Scottish immigrants, received a land grant from the government for the purpose of farming. They were the first settlers on the land, which eventually came to be named for them. The area grew, however remaining a farming community from 1721 to the 1850s.

Mr. & Mrs. Craig raised a family which consisted of two (2) sons, Robert and James. Mr. Craig gave his sons the farm, dividing it equally between them. Robert inherited the eastern half while James inherited the western half.

More Recently:

Since incorporation in 1960, the Town has been able to supply water and sewer services to almost everyone in the Town and even some residents in the county. The water and sewer systems have been updated with the assistance from Community Development Block Grants. The Town operated the street lights which have been increased to over 100.

The early 1960s saw the advent of many changes to this community. The county school system moved the high school from Craigsville to Buffalo Gap. The elementary school later moved from its former location to the old high school building with the elementary school building no longer being used. The building has since been renovated and converted into apartments.

Many of the former stores such as the bakery, laundry mat, barber shop, drug store, theater and hotel have long since closed. However, there are still stores which provide almost any item desired or required by the Town residents.

The Lehigh Portland Cement Company closed in 1968 as well as the Craigsville division of the Stillwater Worsted Mill Industry. The building that was formerly Stillwater is currently used for storage.

On the positive side, the Augusta Correctional Center moved into Estaline Valley. The town supplies water services to the prison, which pays for the service on a monthly basis and offers many employment opportunities. However, the prison’s permanent closure was announced in December 2023 by the Virginia Department of Corrections. Craigsville’s economic livelihood is at stake; the town will lose key water revenue from the prison, and local businesses could also take a financial blow with fewer people coming into town.

== Geography ==
Craigsville is located at 38°4′46″N 79°22′52″W (38.079439, −79.381224).

According to the United States Census Bureau, the town has a total area of 2.0 square miles (5.3 km^{2}), all land.

== Transportation ==
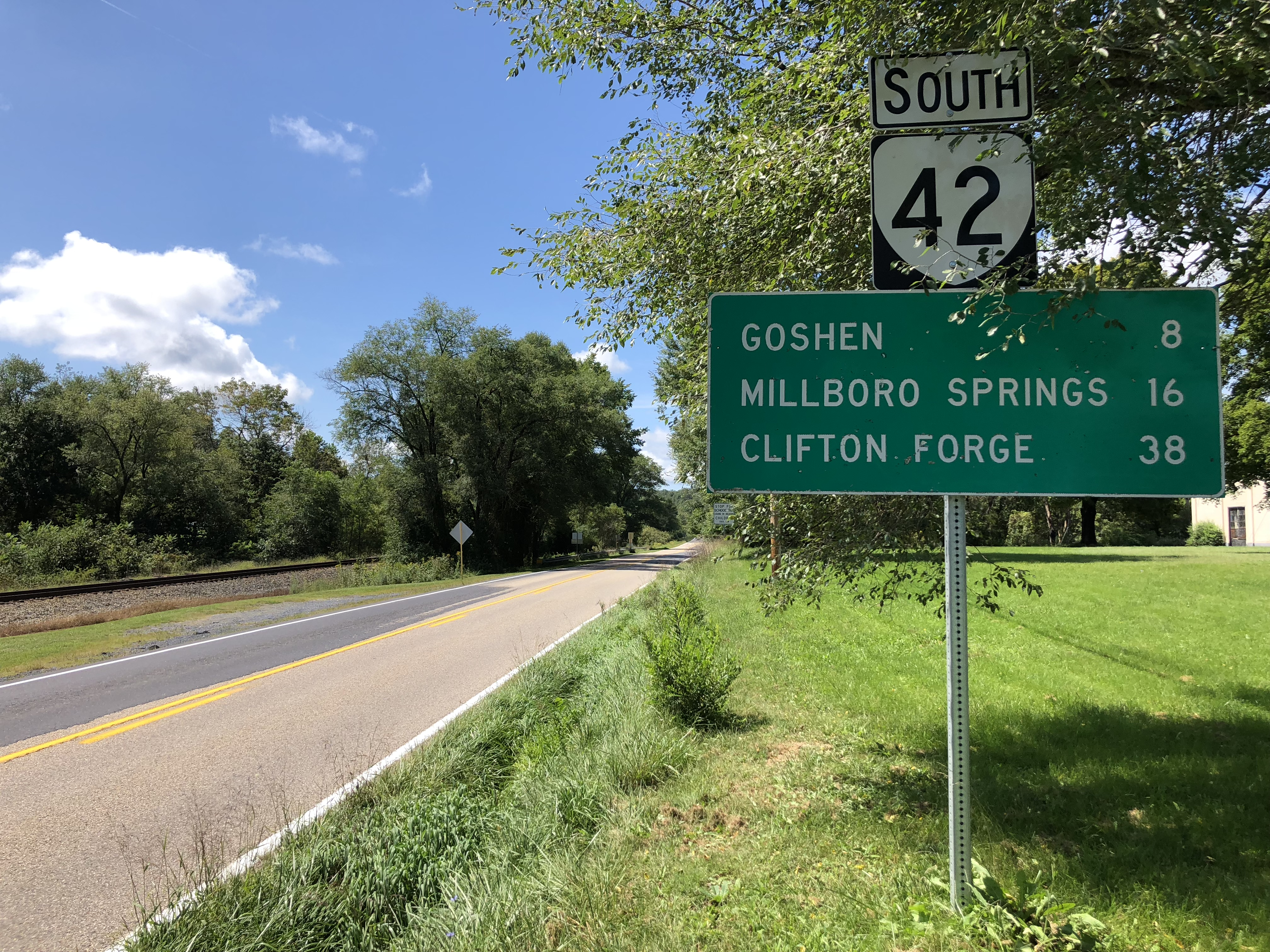
View south along SR 42 leaving Craigsville

The only significant highway providing access to Craigsville is Virginia State Route 42. To the northeast, the road connects with U.S. Route 250 and, via Virginia State Route 254, Interstate 81 near Staunton. To the southwest, the road connects to Interstate 64.

== Demographics ==
Historical population
Census	Pop.	Note	%±
1880	117		—
1960	978		—
1970	988		1.0%
1980	845		−14.5%
1990	812		−3.9%
2000	979		20.6%
2010	923		−5.7%
2020	899		−2.6%
U.S. Decennial Census

As of the census of 2000, there were 979 people, 413 households, and 272 families living in the town. The population density was 495.5 people per square mile (190.9/km^{2}). There were 474 housing units at an average density of 239.9 per square mile (92.4/km^{2}). The racial makeup of the town was 96.73% White, 1.74% African American, 0.31% Native American, 0.20% from other races, and 1.02% from two or more races. Hispanic or Latino of any race were 0.41% of the population.

There were 413 households, out of which 31.5% had children under the age of 18 living with them, 49.2% were married couples living together, 13.6% had a female householder with no husband present, and 34.1% were non-families. Of all households, 32.0% were made up of individuals, and 14.8% had someone living alone who was 65 years of age or older. The average household size was 2.37 and the average family size was 2.98.

In the town, the population was spread out, with 24.9% under the age of 18, 8.0% from 18 to 24, 29.6% from 25 to 44, 21.7% from 45 to 64, and 15.8% who were 65 years of age or older. The median age was 38 years. For every 100 females there were 83.3 males. For every 100 females age 18 and over, there were 82.8 males.

The median income for a household in the town was $27,500, and the median income for a family was $36,771. Males had a median income of $23,688 versus $21,667 for females. The per capita income for the town was $16,226. About 9.3% of families and 13.1% of the population were below the poverty line, including 11.3% of those under age 18 and 13.3% of those age 65 or over.

== Notable person ==
- Tony Schiavone, AEW and WCW professional wrestling announcer and sports talk show host

== Climate ==
The climate in this area is characterized by hot, humid summers and generally mild to cool winters. According to the Köppen Climate Classification system, Craigsville has a humid subtropical climate, abbreviated "Cfa" on climate maps.
