= Indian Creek serial killings =

2016–17 serial killings in Kansas City, Missouri

Fredrick Scott
- Born: Fredrick Demond Scott; November 18, 1994 (age 31)
- Convictions: Four counts of first-degree murder Four counts of armed criminal action

Details
- Victims: 4 confirmed, 6 total suspected
- Span of crimes: 2016–2017
- Country: United States
- State: Missouri
- Date apprehended: 2017

The Indian Creek serial killings were a series of murders that occurred between August 2016 and August 2017, near the Indian Creek Trail, Kansas City, Missouri. During that period, six victims were found shot and murdered in surrounding areas nearby the trail, and most of them were middle-aged men. Investigators later deduced that the killings were likely committed by the same person, due to the similarities between these cases. A male suspect, Fredrick Demond Scott (born November 18, 1994), was arrested in 2017 after DNA tests linked him to the crime, and after a trial in 2026, he was found guilty of four out of six murders, and is currently awaiting sentencing.

== Killings ==
Between August 2016 and August 2017, six people — one woman and five men — were found murdered near the Indian Creek Trail in southern Kansas City, Missouri. The proximity of several of the crime scenes along the trail led local media to refer to the killings collectively as the "Indian Creek serial murders."

Based on investigations, most of the male victims were being killed after they were last seen walking near or on the trail. The first male victim, 55-year-old John Palmer, was found dead in the forest nearby the Indian Creek Trail, where he was shot to death on August 19, 2016. The second presumed victim was 67-year-old David Lenox, who was last seen heading home after he brought his two pet dogs for a walk and went to the bathroom near his Willow Creek apartment, before he was found shot to death on February 27, 2017. Two months after Lenox's murder, the third presumed victim, 57-year-old Timothy Rice, was shot multiple times and killed inside a shelter at a park where he was camping.

On May 18, 2017, the fourth victim, 61-year-old Michael "Mike" Darby was killed while he was walking his dogs along the Indian Creek Trail. The fifth victim and the only female victim, Karen Harmeyer, was killed sometime in July 2017, approximately two months after Darby’s death. Harmeyer, who was homeless, was living in a wooded area near a local church in Granville, Missouri, at the time of her death. Her body was discovered inside the tent where she had been living.

The sixth and final murder occurred on August 13, 2017, when 57-year-old Steven Gibbons was fatally shot after he got off a bus in south Kansas City. This was the case that led to the identification and capture of the serial killer, after the police obtained surveillance camera footage that showed the victim being tailed by the perpetrator before he was shot, and evidence left at the crime scene that linked the culprit to not only Gibbons's murder but the rest as well.

== Investigations ==
=== Identification of the suspect ===
On August 29, 2017, the authorities announced that they arrested 22-year-old Fredrick Demond Scott as a suspect behind the Indian Creek serial killings. Scott was arrested on August 17, 2017, and he was identified as the perpetrator in two of the homicides through footage evidence and DNA testing. In the case of Steven Gibbons, the police identified Scott as the killer through the footage evidence that captured Scott following Gibbons after the latter got off the bus, before Gibbons was shot dead. A cigarette butt and an iced tea bottle were also found at the scene of Gibbons's murder, and the DNA profile on both items were matched to Scott. Additionally, in the case of John Palmer, the police matched Scott to the DNA profile recovered from a T-shirt found at the scene of Palmer's death.

Investigations also revealed that throughout the previous year leading up to his arrest, Scott had separately filed four stolen gun reports to the police. The first three homicides occurred within days — and, in some cases, mere hours — of these reports, but it was not clear when the fourth gun theft was reported. It was speculated that the four reports were filed by Scott as a strategy to distract the investigators and prevent himself from being linked to the killings. While the motive was not clearly identified at this point, the police suspected that the killings were likely racially-motivated, because it was uncovered that back in 2014, Scott allegedly made a threat to kill white people, and it was noted that the victims were white and middle-aged while Scott himself was African-American. However, Scott's mother revealed in an interview that Scott did not have any ill-feelings towards white people and he was also diagnosed with paranoid schizophrenia, for which he declined to seek medical treatment.

=== Charges ===
On August 29, 2017, Scott was charged with two counts of first-degree murder and criminal action for the deaths of Steven Gibbons and John Palmer. He was also identified as a prime suspect behind the killings of the other three male victims.

On October 6, 2017, Scott was charged with the murder of Karen Harmeyer, after her death was linked to Scott.

On March 2, 2018, Scott was indicted by a grand jury with the murders of Harmeyer, Gibbons and Palmer. He was additionally indicted with three more murder counts for the deaths of the other three male victims: David Lenox, Timothy Rice and Michael Darby.

=== Background of the suspect ===
Fredrick Demond Scott was born on November 18, 1994, in Kansas City. He reportedly started signs of a mental disorder in his childhood, and according to his mother, he was diagnosed with paranoid schizophrenia in the early 2000s, but refused to seek treatment. As a result, Scott attended the "Center Alternative School", an alternative school for children with mental disabilities.

In 2013, Scott was arrested for assaulting his mother, but was soon released after she recanted her testimony. A year after that, Scott started making statements espousing the superiority of African Americans over whites and the need to carry out mass murders. Shortly before graduating from high school, he publicly stated that, inspired by the Columbine High School massacre, he planned to carry out a similar attack on the students and staff at his own school.

Soon afterwards, Scott was expelled and arrested for terroristic threats. He was convicted of this charge and sentenced to 180 days imprisonment. On December 14, 2015, his 23-year-old half-brother Gerrod H. Woods was shot and killed alongside another man, Fanandous B. Groves, during a robbery by 20-year-old Jimmie Verge, a black resident of Kansas City. After serving out his sentence, Scott enrolled back in school and graduated in 2015. However, his stepbrother's death had a profound effect on his mental state, leading to him being increasingly aggressive towards others.

Following his graduation, Scott started working at a local Burger King, but still occasionally shoplifted. In 2016, he was caught for one of these thefts and imprisoned for several months. At the time of the crimes, Scott frequently used the Indian Creek trail as a shortcut, due to the fact that he had no personal transportation and often walked or used the bus to travel around.

== Pretrial developments ==
In June 2021, four years after he was first arrested, Fredrick Scott was ruled mentally incompetent to stand trial for the Indian Creek Trail serial murders. Four months later, in October 2021, Scott was re-evaluated and he was deemed mentally fit to plead and stand trial.

In June 2024, a hearing was scheduled in July 2024 to again determine Scott's mental competency to stand trial. The hearing was held on July 30, 2024, and during the session, Scott had a public outburst in court and had to be taken out of the courtroom.

On August 1, 2024, Judge Charles McKenzie of the Jackson County Circuit Court issued a court order to subject Scott to a state behavioral health program through the Missouri Department of Mental Health, where he would undergo another psychiatric evaluation. A month later, a Missouri Department of Mental Health attorney told the press that Scott would potentially be eligible for an early psychiatric assessment if he was subjected to proper medication and management.

On July 7, 2025, Judge McKenzie ruled that Scott was mentally competent to be tried for the serial murder case. Three days later, on July 10, 2025, a trial date of September 3, 2026, was set for Scott to face trial for the murders.

== Trial of the suspect ==
On September 3, 2026, nearly ten years after his first murder, Fredrick Scott officially stood trial for the Indian Creek Trail murders.

During the second day of trial, the prosecution summoned the police officers who responded to each of the six murder scenes as witnesses, and these officers testified in court and provided the description of the crime scenes. The third day oversaw the trial's focus on two of the victims, Mike Darby and Karen Harmeyer, and a witness named Andrew Durk testified that he last saw Darby walking his two dogs on the trail while cycling, and when he came around the curve, he found Darby lying dead on the path. Charles Sexton, the man who found Harmeyer's body, also came as a witness, and he testified that his wife knew the victim, who was a patron of a small business operated by his wife, who became worried after the victim did not show up for some time. Police sergeant Stefany Jones, who responded to the scene of Harmeyer's murder, noted that the body was severely decomposed and infested with maggots, and the face appeared to have been caved in.

On the fourth day, evidence was presented to the jury to describe the murder of Steven Gibbons, and the officers who responded to the scene of crime came to court as witnesses. The surveillance footage that captured Scott tailing after Gibbons before his death was also shown in court. At one point, the defence sought a mistrial declaration due to the interaction between two of the jurors and a deputy, who instructed them to leave the premises when Scott was escorted into the courthouse's elevator.

The prosecution also presented evidence documenting Scott’s purchase of four firearms from a local Kansas City pawn shop. According to the shop’s records, Scott purchased a 9mm pistol on August 15, 2016, followed by a second 9mm pistol on February 21, 2017. He purchased a third 9mm pistol on March 28, 2017, and a fourth on June 20, 2017. Police later recovered three of the receipts for these purchases during a search of Scott’s home. During the seventh day of the trial, evidence was submitted to demonstrate that Scott worked on the same shift as the second victim, David Lenox, at a Pizza Hut restaurant on February 26, 2017, the day before Lenox was murdered.

The jury was also presented with interrogation videos during the trial itself. In one video, when questioned about the murder of Gibbons, Scott initially denied any involvement in this killing before he recanted the statement and claimed that it was an accident, and stated that the gun accidentally fired at Gibbon when he was moving it to his right pocket. In another video, pertaining to the murder probe in the Palmer case, Scott similarly denied that he killed Palmer, but after the police told him that they found his DNA at the crime scene, Scott admitted that he encountered Palmer on the trail back in August 2016, and Palmer allegedly called Scott a racially offensive term, which led to Scott shooting Palmer.

During the closing submission phase, the prosecution urged the jury to convict Scott of all the six murders, due to the multitude of evidence demonstrating his connection to the victims, while the defence centered their arguments on his mental state, stating that Scott suffered from both bipolar disorder and depression, and there was insufficient grounds to satisfy the threshold for first-degree murder since the principle of deliberateness was cast in doubt by the mental condition of Scott, and also refuted that there was no direct evidence linking Scott to the murders. After the conclusion of closing submissions, the jury began to deliberate the case on September 17, 2026.

On September 22, 2026, at the end of the trial, the jury found Scott guilty of four counts of first-degree murder and four counts of armed criminal action. The same jury additionally found him not guilty of the remaining two murders of Timothy Rice and David Lenox. The prosecution announced their decision to seek life imprisonment without the possibility of parole for Scott on the four murder convictions.

On the same day Scott was convicted, the same jury returned with their sentencing verdict, recommending life without parole for each of the four murder counts, as well as 15 years for each count of armed criminal action. Scott is scheduled to be formally sentenced on November 23, 2026.

== See also ==
- List of serial killers in the United States
