= James Rodney Hicks =

American serial killer

- Born: April 17, 1951 (age 75); Etna, Maine, U.S.
- Children: 2
- Conviction: First degree murder (3 counts)
- Penalty: 10 years (1977); Life imprisonment without parole (2000)

Details
- Victims: 3
- Span of crimes: 1977–1996
- Country: United States
- State: Maine
- Date apprehended: 1997
- Imprisoned at: Maine State Prison

James Rodney Hicks is an American serial killer who murdered three women in Maine. He is one of the state's only known serial killers.

== Victims ==
His first murder was that of his wife Jennie Hicks in 1977. His second murder was of Jerilyn Towers in 1982, followed by Lynn Willette in 1996.

== See also ==
- List of serial killers in the United States
