= Ivan Page =

American serial killer

- Born: Ivan Lee Page; April 7, 1969 (age 57); Michigan, U.S.
- Conviction: First degree murder
- Penalty: Life imprisonment

Details
- Victims: 3
- Span of crimes: 1998–2001
- Country: United States
- State: Michigan
- Date apprehended: August 2007

Ivan Lee Page (born April 7, 1969) is an American serial killer who strangled three prostitutes to death in Flint, Michigan, between 1998 and 2001. As a result of DNA testing, Page was arrested for the murders in 2007 while incarcerated for different crimes, later being convicted of one and sentenced to life in prison.

== Murders ==
On May 13, 1998, the body of 34-year-old Patricia "Tresa" Peeler was found dumped near Avenue A in Flint. Due to her being a prostitute, police initially suspected that Peeler had died from a cocaine overdose. However, when investigating the cause of death, Dr. Ljubisa Dragovic stated that Peeler was likely smothered to death. DNA from a male was recovered at the scene.

Over a year later, on October 8, 1999, the body of 31-year-old Lisa Marie Price was found. Price, a sex worker from Canton, Ohio, was found lying in a yard on Susan Street near W. Mott Avenue. An autopsy showed she had been strangled to death. According to police, after the discovery of Price they believed that it was linked to the murder of Peeler, and started speculating a serial killer. DNA was again located on her body.

On January 20, 2001, the body of 34-year-old Deena Brown, a mother of three, was found outside of Northridge Academy. Next to her body was a sweatshirt which, later on, was proven to have been the weapon used to strangle her to death. DNA was found on the sweatshirt.

== Arrest and convictions ==
In March 2006, Page was convicted of cocaine possession and weapons charges. While serving his sentence at a state prison camp, Page was required to submit a sample of his DNA so it could be entered into the FBI's Combined DNA Index System. In August 2007, following the results, his DNA was matched to the DNA that was found on the three murdered women. Following this, he was charged with the murders.

After his arrest, Page's former cellmate, Jerome Currie, came forward and stated that Page often bragged about "choking hos" and "killing those hos". Around this time another man, Lee Plum, said that the night before Brown's body was found, he and Page took turns having sex with her when Page became upset and took Brown into a room for about 30 seconds, only to come out alone and mention something about the police.

Page went to trial for the murder of Deena Brown in 2008. His defense argued the DNA evidence did not prove that he killed her, but rather he had sex with her and someone else might have killed her. In December, he was found guilty, and the following January he was sentenced to life in prison.

Due to his current life term, and the possible risk of discrepancies in witnesses' statements if to try Page again, he will not be tried for the other two murders.

== See also ==
- List of serial killers in the United States
