= List of serial killers in the United States =

A serial killer is typically a person who murders three or more people, with the murders taking place over more than a month and including a significant period of time between them, and who murders to satisfy a psychological need. The Federal Bureau of Investigation (FBI) defines serial murder as "a series of two or more murders, committed as separate events, usually, but not always, by one offender acting alone".

The United States has by far the largest number of documented serial killers in the world. According to Radford University's Serial Killer Information Center, it has more documented serial killers than the next ten highest countries on the list combined.

== Identified serial killers ==
Name	Years active	Proven victims	Possible victims	Fate	Notes	Ref.
Ables, Tony	1970–1990	4	4+	Sentenced to life imprisonment	Murdered robbery victim; paroled and later killed at least three women in St. Petersburg, Florida	
Acevedo, Francisco	1989–1996	3	3	Sentenced to 75 years to life	Strangled three prostitutes in New York between 1989 and 1996	
Adams, Edward James	1920–1921	7	7	Killed by police	Murdered seven people, including three policemen	
Adams, Stanley Theodore	1999	3	5+	Sentenced to death	Murdered three people between August and October 1999, and suspected for at least two more killings	
Agrue, John	1966–1982	3	3+	Died in 2009	Killed his sister-in-law in Illinois; paroled and moved to Colorado, where he killed two more women	
Albanese, Charles	1980–1981	3	3	Executed 1995	Poisoned family members with arsenic in Fox Lake, Illinois to receive their inheritance	
Alcala, Rodney	1971–1979	8	50–130+	Died in prison awaiting execution	Sometimes called "The Dating Game Killer" because of his 1978 appearance on the television show The Dating Game in the midst of his murder spree	
Alix, Franklin DeWayne	1997–1998	4	4	Executed 2010	Murdered people in Houston, Texas, during robberies	
Allen, Herman	1930–1942	4	4	Executed 1942	Killed a lodger in 1930; after release, he killed three more people in a fit of jealousy	
Allen, Howard	1974–1987	3	3	Died in prison	Targeted elderly victims during burglaries in Indiana	
Allen, Quincy	2002	4	4	Sentenced to death; commuted to life imprisonment	Murdered four people in North and South Carolina between July–August 2002	
Allridge, Ronald	1976–1985	3	3	Executed 1995	Murdered people in Fort Worth, Texas, in robberies alongside his brother	
Alston, Robert Sylvester	1991–1993	4	6	Sentenced to life imprisonment	Raped and strangled prostitutes and drug addicts around Greensboro, North Carolina, dismembering their bodies post-mortem	
Anderson, Joshua	2006–2007	4	5	Sentenced to life imprisonment	Fatally shot at least four people in Tulsa, Oklahoma, cannibalizing one, in a series of robbery and revenge-related murders.	
Anderson, Stephen Wayne	1977–1980	3	3	Executed 2002	Murdered three people, including one while incarcerated at Utah State Prison and two as a prison escapee	
Andrews, Patrick	1997–2007	3	3	Sentenced to life imprisonment	Killed three people between 1997 and 2007, including one while incarcerated at USP Hazelton	
Angelo, Richard	1987	4	10	Sentenced to life imprisonment with a minimum term of 50 years	Long Island nurse who poisoned patients in his care	
Archerd, William Dale	1947–1966	3	6	Died in prison	First person convicted of using insulin as a murder weapon	
Archer-Gilligan, Amy	1910–1917	10	50	Died in Connecticut Hospital for the Insane	Poisoned a husband and residents of her nursing home in Windsor, Connecticut	
Arguelles, Roberto	1992	4	4+	Died in prison	Known as "The Salt Lake City Strangler"; violent sex offender who kidnapped and murdered women and girls	
Armstrong, John Eric	1999–2000	5	18	Sentenced to life imprisonment	Navy sailor convicted for murdering five prostitutes in Michigan and Illinois. Confessed to eleven additional murders in East Asia during the 1990s, which were not confirmed.	
Atkins, Benjamin	1991–1992	11	11	Died in prison	Known as "The Woodward Corridor Killer"; serial rapist who preyed on women in Highland Park and Detroit, Michigan	
Atkins, Joseph	1969–1985	3	3	Executed 1999	Murdered his half-brother; paroled, and later murdered his adoptive father and a neighboring couple's daughter during a drunken shooting spree	
Avalos, Johnny	2012–2015	5	5	Sentenced to life imprisonment	Raped and strangled women in San Antonio, Texas	
Avila-Torrez, Jorge	2005–2009	3	3	Sentenced to death; commuted to life imprisonment	Murdered two underage girls in 2005 in Illinois and a 20-year-old Navy Petty Officer in Virginia in 2009	
Balaam, Anthony	1994–1996	4	4	Sentenced to life imprisonment	Known as "The Trenton Strangler"; raped and murdered four women in Trenton, New Jersey	
Baldi, Joseph	1970–1972	4	4	Died in prison	Known as "The Queens Creeper"; mentally-ill burglar who stabbed women to death in the Jamaica, Queens neighborhood after breaking into their apartments	
Baldwin, Clark Perry	1991–1992	3	6+	Died in prison	Long-haul trucker linked via DNA to the murders of three women in Wyoming and Tennessee	
Barber, Danny	1978–1980	4	4	Executed 1999	Murdered three women and one man in Dallas County, Texas, having sex with the corpses of two of his victims	
Barfield, Velma	1971–1978	7	7	Executed 1984	North Carolina serial poisoner who was the first woman in the United States to be executed after the 1976 resumption of capital punishment and the first since 1962. She was also the first woman to be executed by lethal injection.	
Barnes, James Antonio	1988	3	7	Released in 2016	Mentally-ill factory worker who shot and killed prostitutes around Memphis	
Barone, Cesar	1991–1993	5	7+	Died in prison awaiting execution	Killed women around the Portland area and sexually assaulted a number of others	
Barr, Charles	1923	3	3	Executed 1926	Known as "The Petting Party Bandit"; shot couples in lovers' lanes in Memphis during robberies	
Barrett, Eugene	1959–1995	3	3	Died in prison	Killed three women he was romantically involved with in Honolulu, Hawaii	
Baumeister, Herb	1980–1996	11	20	Committed suicide to avoid arrest	Responsible for murdering at least eleven victims who were found buried on his property in Westfield, Indiana	
Baxter, Patrick	1987–1990	3	3	Sentenced to life imprisonment	Raped and murdered one girl and two women in Westchester County, New York	
Beach, Richard	1999	5	5	Sentenced to life imprisonment	Murdered five men in Kansas City, Missouri because of drug use in his house	
Beardslee, Donald	1969–1981	3	3	Executed 2005	Murdered a woman in Missouri; paroled, and later murdered two more women on separate occasions in California	
Beasley, Richard	2011	3	3	Sentenced to death	Murdered three men after luring them with online advertisements of fake job offers	
Beck, Martha	1947–1949	3	20	Executed 1951	With accomplice Raymond Fernandez, became known as "The Lonely Hearts Killers"	
Bell, Cimarron	2003–2004	4	4	Sentenced to death	Shot his girlfriend, and then a trio of men in financially motivated schemes	
Bell, Larry Gene	1984–1985	3	4+	Executed 1996	Abducted, raped and murdered women in the Carolinas, then made taunting phone calls to their families	
Bender Family	1869–1872	11	11+	Unknown	Family of serial killers who lived and operated in Labette County, Kansas	
Berdella, Robert	1984–1987	6	6	Died in prison	Known as "The Kansas City Butcher" and "The Collector"; kidnapped, raped, tortured, and murdered young men in Missouri	
Berkowitz, David	1976–1977	6	6	Sentenced to life imprisonment	Known as "The Son of Sam" and the ".44 Caliber Killer"; shot eight random strangers, killing six, in and around New York City	
Betterton, Monroe	1904–1919	3	3	Executed 1920	Murdered his wives in Missouri and Oklahoma during violent arguments	
Bianchi, Kenneth	1977–1978	12	12	Sentenced to life imprisonment	With accomplice Angelo Buono Jr., known as "The Hillside Stranglers". Murdered young women in Los Angeles and Washington	
Bible, Danny	1979–1983	4	4	Executed 2018	Known as "The Ice Pick Killer"; serial rapist who raped and murdered a neighbor, then committed a triple murder four years later	
Biegenwald, Richard	1958–1983	6	11	Died in prison	Active in New Jersey, suspected in at least two other murders	
Biehler, Robert	1966–1973	4	4	Died in prison	Career criminal who shot four people in Los Angeles to cover up other crimes	
Bird, Jake	1930–1947	13	46	Executed 1949	Sentenced to death for the murders of two people; confessed to forty-four other murders	
Bishop, Arthur Gary	1979–1983	5	5	Executed 1988	Preyed on young boys in Utah between 1979 and 1983	
Bittaker, Lawrence	1979	5	5	Died in prison awaiting execution	With accomplice Roy Norris known as "The Tool Box Killers"; kidnapped, sexually assaulted, tortured and murdered teenage girls in Los Angeles County, California	
Bixler, Rodney Troy	2000	3	4	Sentenced to 40 years in prison	Strangled three women in Kentucky in 2000	
Bladel, Rudy	1963–1978	7	7	Died while incarcerated at Henry Ford Allegiance Health	Known as "The Railway Killer"; his case was part of Michigan v. Jackson, which was later overruled by the Supreme Court	
Blair, Terry	1982–2004	7	9	Died in prison	Sentenced to 25 years in prison for one murder, released on parole after serving 21 years and committed additional murders upon release	
Blake, Eugene	1967–1984	3	3	Sentenced to life imprisonment	Murdered a girl during an unprovoked attack; later paroled and committed two additional murders across Ohio and West Virginia	
Blank, Daniel	1996–1997	6	6	Sentenced to death	Murdered six people between 1996 and 1997 in River Parishes, Louisiana	
Bloomfield, Clifton	2005–2008	5	5	Sentenced to life imprisonment	Movie extra who murdered five people in Albuquerque, New Mexico	
Bolin, Oscar Ray	1986–1987	4	4+	Executed 2016	Murdered three women in Florida and a fourth woman in Texas	
Boatman, Leo	2003–2019	4	4	Sentenced to death	Murdered two campers in 2006, plus two prisoners between 2010 and 2019, all in Florida	
Bolsinger, John Charles	1980–1988	4	4	Committed suicide in custody	Convicted of manslaughter in Utah in 1980; posthumously linked to three rapes and murders in Eugene, Oregon	
Bonin, William	1979–1980	21	36+	Executed 1996	Known as "The Freeway Killer"; preyed on young men and boys in Southern California with several accomplices	
Bounds, Dallen	1999	4	4	Committed suicide to avoid arrest	Murdered acquaintances around South Carolina	
Bowles, Gary Ray	1994	6	6+	Executed 2019	Known as "The I-95 Killer"; targeted gay men in Florida, Georgia and Maryland	
Boyd, Charles Anthony	1986–1987	3	3	Executed 1999	Known as "The Bathroom Slayer"; preyed on women living in the same apartment building in North Dallas he was living in with his brother at the time	
Bradley, James Opelton	1988–2014	3	3	Sentenced to life imprisonment	Murdered his stepdaughter; paroled, and later murdered two women	
Brandt, Charlie	1971–2004	4	7+	Committed suicide to avoid arrest	Shot his parents in 1971 when he was 13, killing his pregnant mother; stabbed his wife and niece to death in 2004	
Brant, Joseph	2007–2008	4	4+	Sentenced to life imprisonment	Killed at least four women in New Orleans in the aftermath of Hurricane Katrina	
Brashers, Robert Eugene	1990–1998	8	8+	Committed suicide to avoid arrest	Known as "Mister Maroon"; serial rapist who murdered at least eight women and girls in Kentucky, Missouri, South Carolina, and Texas, including four in the 1991 Austin yogurt shop murders.	
Bright, Larry	2003–2004	8	8+	Sentenced to life imprisonment	Known as "The Bonecrusher"; strangled black prostitutes at his house in Peoria, burning some of them afterwards	
Britt, Eugene	1995	7	10	Sentenced to life imprisonment	Raped and murdered girls and women in Gary and Portage, Indiana	
Briley Brothers	1979	12	21	Executed 1984/1985 (Linwood and James) Sentenced to life imprisonment (Anthony)	Three brothers and an accomplice responsible for eleven murders	
Broadnax, Donald	1977–1996	3	3	Sentenced to death	Shot his friend to death; later murdered his wife and her grandson while out on work release	
Brooks, Shelly	2001–2006	7	20+	Sentenced to life imprisonment	Raped and murdered middle aged women around Detroit, Michigan	
Brown, Curtis Don	1985–1986	3	18	Sentenced to life imprisonment	Murdered three women around Arlington and Fort Worth, Texas between 1985 and 1986; suspected of up to eighteen murders.	
Brown, Debra Denise	1984	8	8	Sentenced to death; commuted to life imprisonment	Accomplice of Alton Coleman	
Brown, Kenyel	2019–2020	6	6	Committed suicide to avoid arrest	Known as "The Metro Detroit Serial Killer"; lifelong criminal who killed six people in the course of robberies between December 2019 and February 2020 in Wayne County, Michigan	
Brown, Raymond Eugene	1960–1987	5	5	Died in prison awaiting execution	Killed three relatives as a teenager; paroled, and later killed and mutilated his girlfriend and her young daughter	
Brudos, Jerry	1968–1969	4	4	Died in prison	Known as "The Lust Killer" and "The Shoe Fetish Slayer"; necrophile and foot fetishist who assaulted, murdered and dismembered women in Oregon	
Brummett, Lyle	1975–1976	3	3	Sentenced to life imprisonment	Raped and strangled three women in Texas with an accomplice	
Buenoano, Judy	1971–1983	3	3+	Executed 1998	Murdered her husband, son and a boyfriend. Apprehended in 1983 after poisoning and car bombing a fiancé	
Bullock, David	1981–1982	6	6+	Sentenced to 150 years to life	Known as "The .38 Caliber Killer"; shot people at random around New York City to "amuse himself"	
Bunday, Thomas	1979–1981	5	6	Committed suicide to avoid arrest	United States Air Force non-commissioned officer who targeted women and young girls in Fairbanks, Alaska, while serving at Eielson Air Force Base	
Bundy, Ted	1971–1978	20	30+	Executed 1989	Preyed on young white women throughout the United States	
Buono, Angelo Jr.	1977–1978	10	10	Died in prison	With accomplice Kenneth Bianchi, known as "The Hillside Stranglers". Murdered young women in Los Angeles	
Burchart, Leslie	1994–1996	3	7+	Died in prison	Schizophrenic vagrant who killed fellow homeless men; prime suspect in the Golden Years Murders	
Burkett, Nathaniel	1978–2002	5	5+	Died in prison	Murdered women in Mississippi and Nevada during a 24-year period	
Burkhart, Timothy	1986–2001	4	4+	Committed suicide to avoid arrest	Murdered young girls and women in Pierce County, Washington	
Busch, Henry	1960	3	3	Executed 1962	Strangled three women in California, saying that he felt an irresistible urge to kill	
Bush, Jason Eugene	1997–2009	3	5	Sentenced to death	Neo-Nazi who killed at least three Hispanic people in racially motivated slayings	
Butler, Eugene	1900–1906	6	6	Died in North Dakota State Hospital	Mentally ill farmer in Niagara, North Dakota who killed six men and buried their bodies under his home; his crimes were discovered two years after his death during a home renovation	
Byrd, Maurice Oscar	1980–1981	5	6	Executed 1991	Perpetrator of the 1980 Pope's Cafeteria shooting in Missouri where four victims were killed, as well as the 1981 robbery-murder of Fred Johnson in Georgia, and the prime suspect of the 1980 unsolved murder of Margaret Marie Walsh.	
Cable, James Ray	1977–1989	4	6+	Died in prison	Murdered an inmate while imprisoned for rape; released, then killed at least three women in Kentucky	
Campbell, Charles Rodman	1975–1982	4	4+	Executed 1994	Murdered a woman, her daughter, and a neighbor in Clearview, Washington in 1982. DNA test would later connect Campbell to the murder of a University of Washington student in 1975.	
Canaday, John Dwight	1968–1969	3	3	Died in prison	Considered Washington state's first known serial killer; sexually assaulted and murdered women in Seattle	
Cannon, Patty	1802–1829	4	25+	Died in prison awaiting trial	Gang leader who kidnapped slaves and free blacks to either sell or torture them	
Cantu, Peter Anthony	1993	3	3	Executed 2010	Leader of the "Black and White" gang that kidnapped, raped, and murdered a woman and two teenage girls in a Texas	
Caputo, Ricardo	1971–1977	4	6	Died in prison	Argentine-born man who killed three women in the U.S. and one in Mexico	
Carignan, Harvey	1949–1974	3	5+	Died in prison	Known as "The Want-Ad Killer"; escaped hanging for a 1949 killing on a technicality	
Caro, Fernando Eros	1979–1980	3	5+	Died in prison	Kidnapped, raped and shot children and teenagers around Fresno County, California	
Carpenter, David	1979–1981	8	10+	Sentenced to death	Known as "The Trailside Killer"; serial rapist known for stalking and murdering women hiking on trails in state parks in California	
Carr, Robert Frederick	1972–1976	4	4	Died in prison	Pedophile who targeted children in both Florida and Connecticut.	
Carson, Michael Bear	1981–1983	3	3+	Sentenced to 75 years to life	Dubbed "The San Francisco Witch Killers"; considered suspects in nearly a dozen other deaths in the U.S. and Europe	
Carson, Suzan	1981–1983	3	3+	Sentenced to 75 years to life	Dubbed "The San Francisco Witch Killers"; considered suspects in nearly a dozen other deaths in the U.S. and Europe	
Castro, Edward	1986–1987	3	3	Executed 2000	Robbed and murdered gay men across three Florida counties	
Catlin, Steven David	1976–1984	3	4	Sentenced to death	Poisoned his mother and two wives with Paraquat	
Catoe, Jarvis	1935–1941	8	11	Executed 1943	Sometimes referred to as the "D.C. Strangler"; active in Washington, D.C.	
Chadd, Billy Lee	1974–1978	3	4	Sentenced to life imprisonment	Raped and murdered two women in California. He also murdered a man in Nevada.	
Chandler, Oba	1989–1990	4	4+	Executed 2011	Also known as "Dave Posner" and "Dave Posno"	
Chase, Richard	1977–1978	6	6	Committed suicide prior to execution	Known as "The Vampire of Sacramento"; necrophile and cannibal who murdered six people in the span of a month, between December 1977 and January 1978 in Sacramento, California	
Chaves, Louis	1968–1987	3	3	Released in 2022	Murdered a couple in 1968 and later killed a police officer in 1987	
Chavez, Juan	1986–1990	6	6+	Committed suicide in prison	Robbed and killed gay men in three cities in Los Angeles County	
Chavez, Juan Rodriguez	1985–1995	12	12	Executed 2003	Known as "The Thrill Killer"; killed a neighbor during a burglary; paroled and went on a killing spree with a teenage accomplice	
Cherry, Ervin	1993–1994	3	3	Sentenced to life imprisonment	Habitual criminal who strangled three women in North Florida	
Chester, Elroy	1997–1998	5	5	Executed 2013	Killed five people in Texas, including his brother-in-law	
Childs, Terry	1979–1985	5	12	Died in prison	Kidnapped, tortured, raped and killed women across Nevada and California	
Christensen, William Dean	1982–1983	4	24+	Died in prison	Known as "The American Jack the Ripper"; murdered and mutilated people between Canada and the United States	
Christiansen, Thor Nis	1976–1979	4	4	Murdered in prison by fellow inmate	Preyed on college-aged women in California	
Christopher, Joseph	1980–1981	12	12	Died in prison	Known as "The Midtown Slasher" and the ".22-Caliber Killer"; targeted mainly African-American men and boys in New York, shooting some victims and stabbing and dismembering others	
Clark, Doug	1980	7	7	Died in prison awaiting execution	With accomplice Carol Bundy, known as "The Sunset Strip Killers"; preyed on young women in West Hollywood and Los Angeles, California	
Clark, Vernon Lee	1980–1989	4	6+	Sentenced to life imprisonment	Sexually assaulted and killed at least four women in Maryland	
Clement, Mary	1880–1885	4	4	Died in 1944	Luxembourgish immigrant who poisoned her family members with arsenic; released in 1886	
Code, Nathaniel	1984–1987	8	12	Sentenced to death	Committed at least eight murders in Shreveport, Louisiana	
Coffman, Cynthia	1986	4	4	Sentenced to death	Kidnapped four women by ATMs before accomplice James Gregory Marlow strangled them	
Cole, Carroll	1947–1980	5	35	Executed 1985	Drowned an 8-year old classmate while still a child and strangled multiple women in California, Nevada and Texas as an adult	
Coleman, Alton	1984	8	8	Executed 2002	Multi-state killer who, with his accomplice, murdered a man and injured another, murdered four women and three young girls, and raped a young girl	
Collins, Harvey	1953–1955	3	3	Executed 1957	Marine who stabbed a woman to death in Kentucky; later killed two people in Washington during robberies	
Colvin, Dellmus	1987–2005	7	7+	Sentenced to life imprisonment	Truck driver who killed prostitutes in New Jersey and Ohio	
Conde, Rory Enrique	1994–1995	6	6	Sentenced to death	Known as "The Tamiami Trail Strangler"; Colombian-born man who killed six prostitutes in Florida over a span of five months	
Cook, Anthony	1973–1981	9	9+	Sentenced to life imprisonment	Committed crimes together	
Cook, Nathaniel	1973–1981	9	9+	Released in 2018	Committed crimes together	
Cooks, Jessie Lee	1973–1974	15	73+	Died in prison	Part of "The Death Angels", group responsible for the Zebra murders	
Cooksey Jr., Cleophus	2017	8	9	Sentenced to death	Murdered eight people in Phoenix, Arizona between November and December 2017.	
Cooper, Samuel	2006–2007	5	5	Sentenced to life imprisonment	Shot and killed men in North Carolina	
Copeland, Faye	1986–1989	5	12	Died in 2003 after release on parole in 2002	The oldest couple ever sentenced to death in the United States	
Copeland, Ray	1986–1989	5	12	Died in prison awaiting execution	The oldest couple ever sentenced to death in the United States	
Corll, Dean	1970–1973	29	29+	Murdered by accomplice Elmer Wayne Henley	Known as "The Candy Man" and "The Pied Piper". Crimes referred to as "The Houston Mass Murders"; raped and murdered boys and young men in Texas with the aid of teenaged accomplices David Owen Brooks and Elmer Wayne Henley	
Corona, Juan	1971	25	25	Died in prison	Mexican farm contractor who murdered male migrant workers in Sutter County, California, and buried their bodies in peach orchards	
Corwin, Daniel Lee	1987	3	3	Executed 1998	Abducted and killed three women around Texas	
Costa, Tony	1968–1969	4	8	Committed suicide in prison	Preyed on women in and around Truro, Massachusetts	
Cottingham, Richard	1967–1980	18	85–100	Sentenced to life imprisonment	Known as "The Torso Killer"; raped, strangled and dismembered numerous women across New York and New Jersey	
Covington, Juan	1998–2005	3	3+	Sentenced to life imprisonment	Shot people at random in Philadelphia due to paranoid hallucinations	
Cowan, Mary	1884–1894	6	6	Died in prison	Known as "The Borgia of Maine". Poisoned two husbands and four children	
Cox, Frederick Pete	1997	3	3	Sentenced to life imprisonment	Murdered prostitutes in Orlando, Florida	
Cox, Michael	1984	3	3	Sentenced to death	Kidnapped and fatally stabbed three teenage girls in California, burying their bodies in the Eldorado National Forest	
Craine, Louis	1984–1987	4	5+	Died in prison	Responsible for at least two of "The Southside Slayer" murders in South Los Angeles	
Crawford, Andre	1993–1999	11	11	Died in prison	Chicago transient who preyed on prostitutes and the destitute	
Creech, Thomas Eugene	1974–1981	5	42	Sentenced to death	Transient who killed people in various states, some allegedly as part of a biker gang or for human sacrifices	
Crump, Thomas Wayne	1980–1982	4	7	Died in prison	Murdered three people during a five-month crime spree in 1980 and a cab driver in 1982; confessed to murders dating back to 1956	
Cullen, Charles	1988–2003	29	400+	Sentenced to life imprisonment	Nurse in New Jersey and Pennsylvania who murdered patients	
Cunanan, Andrew	1997	5	5	Committed suicide to avoid arrest	Italian fashion designer Gianni Versace was among his victims	
Cunningham, Mark William	1983	3	3	Sentenced to life imprisonment	Shot and killed three men in Southern California for no apparent reason	
Curry, James Richard	1982–1983	4	5	Committed suicide in custody	One victim was Mary Silvani, whose identity was not discovered for 37 years	
Cutlip, Jeffrey Paul	1975–1993	3	4	Died in prison	Murdered two women and a teenage girl in Oregon	
Dahmer, Jeffrey	1978–1991	17	17	Murdered in prison by fellow inmate Christopher Scarver	Milwaukee cannibal who retained various body parts of his victims	
Daniels, James Edward	1963–1984	4	4	Died in a car crash prior to apprehension	Killed acquaintances in minor disputes	
Danielson, Robert Wayne	1970–1982	7	7+	Committed suicide prior to execution	Murdered people at campsites across three states	
Danks, Joseph Martin	1986–1990	7	7	Sentenced to death	Murdered his cellmate while serving a life sentence for murdering six homeless men during a stabbing spree	
Daugherty, Jeffrey Joseph	1976	5	5	Executed 1988	Robbed and murdered a total of four women and one man in Pennsylvania and Florida.	
Davis, Bruce Alan	1971–1982	3	33	Committed suicide in prison	Murdered two men during robberies, and later a prison guard; confessed to numerous sexually motivated murders of men across the country	
Davis, Charles William	1975–1977	4	4+	Sentenced to life imprisonment	Ambulance dispatcher who abducted, raped and killed women in Baltimore	
Davis, Frank	1971–1983	3	3	Died in prison	Raped and murdered three teenage boys in Indiana	
Davis, Girvies	1978–1979	4	9+	Executed 1995	Accomplice of Richard Holman; killed people during robberies since eliminating witnesses was "easier" than wearing a mask	
Davis, William George	2017–2018	4	7	Sentenced to death	Nurse who killed patients at the Tyler, Texas hospital where he worked	
DeAngelo, Joseph James	1979–1986	13	13+	Sentenced to life imprisonment	Known as "The Golden State Killer", "The Visalia Ransacker", "The East Area Rapist", and "The Original Night Stalker"; murdered three people in Sacramento and ten people in Southern California from 1975 through 1986; also linked to more than fifty rapes in the Sacramento area from 1976 to 1979	
DeJesus, Carmello	1971–1973	3	4	Committed suicide to avoid arrest	Itinerant gambler who killed female acquaintances during arguments	
Demps, Bennie	1971–1976	3	3	Executed 2000	Murdered two people during a robbery in 1971, and later killed another inmate in 1976 while serving life imprisonment	
Dennis, Jerome	1991–1992	5	5	Sentenced to life imprisonment	Responsible for killing five women in Newark and East Orange, New Jersey, while on parole	
Denton, Earl Van	1970–1977	8	8	Executed 1997	Along with accomplice Paul Ruiz, escaped from prison and murdered seven people in Arkansas, Louisiana, and Oklahoma while serving life sentence for previous murder	
Devonshire, William	2003–2022	3	3	Died before trial	Murdered a neighbor in Delaware; paroled, then murdered two homeless women along the Tamiami Trail in Florida	
Dewantoro, Harnoko	1991–1992	3	3	Sentenced to death; released in 2019	Indonesian national who killed two business associates and his brother in Los Angeles, stashing their bodies in storage facilities	
Dieteman, Samuel	2005–2006	8	8	Sentenced to life imprisonment	Targeted random strangers during drive-by shootings and arsons in Phoenix, Arizona. Accomplice Dale Hausner committed suicide in prison	
Dillon, Thomas	1989–1992	5	5+	Died in prison	Shot men at random in southeastern Ohio	
Dodd, Westley Allan	1989	3	3	Executed 1993	Convicted sex offender who sexually assaulted and murdered three young boys in Vancouver, Washington, in 1989	
Dominique, Ronald	1997–2006	23	23+	Sentenced to life imprisonment	Raped and murdered male victims in Louisiana	
Donaldson, Howell	2017	4	4	Sentenced to life imprisonment	Shot and killed four people, seemingly at random, in the Seminole Heights neighborhood of Tampa, Florida	
Dorsey, Leon	1994	3	3	Executed 2008	Murdered store employees around Texas	
Doss, Nannie	1927–1954	11	11	Died in prison	Known as "The Giggling Granny" and "The Jolly Black Widow"; poisoned four husbands, two children, her two sisters, her mother, a grandson, and a mother-in-law	
Dotson, Jessie	1994–2008	7	7	Sentenced to death	Killed a man during a botched drug deal; after release, he killed six people, including his brother, brother's girlfriend, and two nephews	
Dowler, David	1983–1987	3	3	Sentenced to life imprisonment	Poisoned three acquaintances in Odessa, Texas	
Duffy, Charles Lee	1997	3	3	Sentenced to life imprisonment	Robbed, raped, and murdered women across two Georgia counties	
Dugan, Brian	1983–1985	3	3+	Sentenced to death; commuted to life imprisonment	Serial rapist active in and around Chicago, Illinois	
DuMond, Wayne	1972–2001	3	3	Died in prison	Gained notoriety after Governor Mike Huckabee commuted his life sentence for rape in Arkansas; later went on to rape and murder two women in Missouri	
Duncan, Joseph Edward	1996–2005	5	7	Died in prison awaiting execution	Raped at least seventeen young boys and three young girls	
Duncan, Vender	1955–1957	3	3	Executed 1959	Burglar who raped and violently beat elderly women in San Francisco, fatally injuring three	
Dunkle, Jon	1981–1985	3	3	Sentenced to death	Murdered three young boys in California, including his friend's younger brother	
Durocher, Michael Alan	1983–1988	5	5	Executed 1993	Murdered five people in Florida, including his six-month-old son, his girlfriend and her daughter	
Durousseau, Paul	1997–2003	7	7+	Sentenced to death; commuted to life imprisonment	Murdered seven women in the Southeastern United States, included two who were pregnant; German authorities suspect Durousseau may have killed several local women when he was stationed there with the Army during the early 1990s	
Eaglin, Dwight Thomas	1998–2003	3	3	Sentenced to death	Murdered a man outside a bar in 1998, before killing a fellow prisoner and female correction officer at a prison in 2003.	
Edwards, Andrew David	1987–1992	4	4	Sentenced to life imprisonment	Murdered transients in alcohol-induced rages	
Edwards, Edward	1977–1996	5	15+	Died in prison awaiting execution	Sentenced to death for shooting his foster son in 1996 insurance murder	
Edwards, Mack Ray	1953–1970	6	6+	Committed suicide prior to execution	Pedophile who preyed on children in Los Angeles County, California	
Edwards, Thomas Francis	1970–1981	3	3	Died in prison awaiting execution	Known as "The Bethesda Butcher"; shot and killed a young girl in California; posthumously linked to two murders in Maryland	
Eichinger, John	1999–2005	4	4	Sentenced to death	Stabbed three women and a child to death in Pennsylvania; two of the women had rejected his romantic advances	
Eisele, Joseph	1867	3	3	Executed 1868	Known as "The Parkersburg Murderer"; German emigrant who killed fellow emigrants in violent robberies	
Ellis, Walter E.	1986–2007	8	10+	Died in prison	Known as "The Milwaukee North Side Strangler"	
Engleman, Glennon	1958–1980	5	7+	Died in prison	Dentist who worked as a contract killer and plotted with women to kill their husbands so they could share the insurance money	
Erskine, Scott	1989–1993	3	3+	Died in prison awaiting execution	Raped and murdered two young boys in California and a woman in Florida	
Ervin, Joe Michael	1969–1981	6	6	Committed suicide in custody	Shot and killed a police officer in Denver, Colorado while avoiding a murder warrant in Texas; posthumously linked to four additional murders in the Denver metropolitan area	
Escobar, Ramon	2018–2023	7	8	Sentenced to life imprisonment	Beat his uncle, aunt, and several homeless people to death between Texas and California	
Espinosa, Felipe	1863	32	32	Killed by Tom Tobin	Murdered various people across the Colorado Territory	
Evans, Donald Leroy	1985–1991	3	70	Murdered in prison by a fellow death row inmate	Suspected of another dozen murders but recanted his confessions to over seventy more	
Evans, Gary	1985–1997	5	5	Committed suicide after escaping police custody	Leader of a ring of jewelry and antique thieves who operated in and around Capital District, New York	
Evonitz, Richard	1996–1997	3	3+	Committed suicide to avoid arrest	Kidnapped, raped and murdered three girls in Spotsylvania County, Virginia, and abducted and assaulted a 15-year-old girl in Richland County, South Carolina	
Ewell, John	2010	4	4	Sentenced to life imprisonment	Advocate against the "3 strikes law" who robbed and murdered middle-aged and elderly people in Los Angeles	
Eyler, Larry	1982–1984	21	24	Died in prison awaiting execution	Known as "The Interstate Killer" and the "Highway Killer"; preyed on boys and young men in the Midwest	
Falling, Christine	1980–1982	6	6	Sentenced to life imprisonment	Epileptic who strangled infants in Florida because of voices in her head	
Fautenberry, John	1990–1991	5	6	Executed 2009	Befriended, murdered and robbed people across four states	
Fayne, Lorenzo	1989–1993	6	6	Sentenced to death; commuted to life imprisonment	Raped and murdered a woman and five children in Wisconsin and Illinois	
Feltner, Jeffrey	1988–1989	7	7	Died in prison	Nurse's aide who smothered patients to "end their suffering"	
Ferguson, John Errol	1974–1978	8	12	Executed 2013	Murdered multiple people in the Miami-Dade County, Florida area	
Fernandes, Roberto Wagner	2000–2001	3	4+	Died in a plane crash	Brazilian flight attendant who killed prostitutes in Miami, Florida; suspected in other deaths	
Fernandez, Raymond	1947–1949	3	20	Executed 1951	With accomplice Martha Beck, became known as "The Lonely Hearts Killers"	
Figueroa, Danny	1986	3	3	Died in prison	Known as "The Backwoods Sniper"; Self-styled survivalist who shot three people to death across Southern California	
Fish, Albert	1924–1932	3	8+	Executed 1936	Known as "The Werewolf of Wysteria"; sadist and pedophile who cannibalized several children.	
Fisher, Constance	1954–1966	6	6	Accidentally drowned after escaping from a mental hospital	Paranoid schizophrenic who drowned her six children on two different occasions in Maine	
Fitzsimmons, George	1969–1973	4	4	Died in prison	Known as "The Karate Chop Killer"; mental patient who killed his parents in New York, then was released and killed his aunt and uncle in Pennsylvania	
Flowers, Norman	2004–2005	3	4	Sentenced to life imprisonment	Raped, beat, and strangled women in their Las Vegas apartments	
Floyd, Cecil Henry	1973–1974	6	11	Died in prison	Murdered people during robberies, sometimes with the help of his wife or other accomplices	
Foley, Robert Carl	1976–1991	7	9+	Sentenced to death	Murdered a man in a 1976 shooting, killed four people during a 1989 shooting, and killed a pair of brothers in 1991.	
Ford, Lester	1991	3	3	Sentenced to life imprisonment	Murdered three women and raped two others during a six-month crime spree in Queens, New York	
Ford, Wayne Adam	1997–1998	4	4+	Sentenced to death	Killed and mutilated four women in California	
Forte, Linwood	1990	3	4	Sentenced to death	Known as "The Nightstalker"; home invader who suffocated elderly residents at their homes in Goldsboro	
Fountain, Clayton Anthony	1974–1983	5	5	Died in prison	Killed his superior officer in the Philippines, then killed inmates and guards in federal prisons	
Francois, Kendall	1996–1998	8	10+	Died in prison	Known as "The Poughkeepsie Killer"; convicted of the murders of eight women in New York	
Frank, Antoinette Renee	1993–1995	4	4	Sentenced to death	New Orleans Police Department officer who murdered three people during a robbery with accomplice Rogers LaCaze; previously murdered her father two years earlier	
Franklin, Joseph Paul	1977–1980	11	22	Executed 2013	Also attempted to assassinate Larry Flynt and Vernon Jordan	
Franklin Jr., Lonnie David	1985–2007	10	25+	Died in prison awaiting execution	Known as "The Grim Sleeper"; charged after DNA evidence linked him with ten murders in Los Angeles since 1985	
Frederick, James Anthony	1991–1992	3	3	Sentenced to life imprisonment	Killed people during robberies in Lantana, Florida	
Fry, Robert	1996–2000	4	4	Sentenced to death; commuted to life imprisonment	Killed four men and women in Farmington, New Mexico	
Gacy, John Wayne	1972–1978	33	33+	Executed 1994	Known as "The Killer Clown"; preyed on young men and boys in and around Chicago	
Gallego, Charlene	1978–1980	10	10+	Released in 1997	Known as the "Sex Slave Killers"; kidnapped, sexually assaulted, and murdered ten people in three states	
Gallego, Gerald	1978–1980	10	10+	Died in prison awaiting execution	Known as the "Sex Slave Killers"; kidnapped, sexually assaulted, and murdered ten people in three states	
Garcia, Anthony	2008–2013	4	4	Sentenced to death	Former doctor who killed four people in Omaha, Nebraska, as revenge for being fired	
Gardner, Earl	1925–1935	3	3	Executed 1936	Killed a man during a fight; after release, he killed his wife and infant son	
Gardner, Ray Dempsey	1941–1949	3	3	Executed 1951	Killed people in North Dakota, Utah, and Montana	
Garduno, Santiago	1900s–1932	3	4	Executed 1933	Killed at least three people in Colorado and New Mexico	
Gargiulo, Michael	1993–2008	3	10	Sentenced to death	Known as "The Hollywood Ripper"; stabbed three women to death	
Garrison, Wayne Henry	1972–1989	3	3	Sentenced to death; commuted to life imprisonment	Murdered three children, two of which as a child himself, in Tulsa, Oklahoma	
Gary, Carlton	1970–1978	4	8+	Executed 2018	Known as "The Stocking Strangler"; raped and murdered elderly women in Columbus, Georgia; also linked to a murder in New York	
Gaskin, Louis Bernard	1986–1989	3	3	Executed 2023	Known as the "Ninja Killer"; robbed and murdered a couple three years after killing a man who owed him money, in Florida	
Gaskins, Donald Henry	1953–1982	9	100+	Executed 1991	Convicted of nine murders; claimed to an author to have killed more than 100	
Gavin, Kevin	2015–2021	3	5	Sentenced to life imprisonment	Handyman who murdered three elderly women at a housing complex in Brooklyn over monetary disputes	
Gay, Randy	1978–2011	3	3	Sentenced to death	Murdered three people, including his father-in-law and his biological father, during arguments	
Gayles, Clifford	1934–1947	3	3	Executed 1948	Killed his girlfriend; paroled and went on a crime spree, resulting in the deaths of two others	
Gaynor, Alfred	1995–1998	9	9	Sentenced to life imprisonment	Raped and strangled drug-addicted women in Springfield, Massachusetts	
Gecht, Robin	1981–1982	18	18	Sentenced to 120 years in prison	Leader of the organized crime group known as "The Ripper Crew" or "The Chicago Rippers"	
Geralds, Hubert	1994–1995	5	5	Sentenced to death; commuted to life imprisonment	Known as "The Englewood Strangler"; Illinois man who sexually assaulted and strangled sex workers	
Getreu, John	1963–1974	3	4+	Died in prison	Raped and murdered a 15-year-old girl on a U.S. Army base in West Germany in 1963 and was released after six years, then returned to the United States and murdered two young women in the early 1970s near Stanford University	
Gibbs, Janie Lou	1966–1967	5	5	Died in 2010 after release in 1999	Killed her three sons, a grandson, and her husband, by arsenic poisoning	
Gibson, Keith	2008–2021	3	7	Sentenced to life imprisonment	Killed strangers and his mother during robberies in Delaware and Pennsylvania after being paroled from prison	
Gibson, Mose	1908–1920	3	7+	Executed 1920	Committed murders during burglaries or during the course of robberies across several states. Guilt has been questioned	
Gibson, William Clyde	2002–2012	3	33	Sentenced to death	Sexually assaulted and murdered women across Indiana	
Gifford, Bertha	1900–1928	3	17	Died in Missouri State Hospital #4	Missouri serial poisoner; found not guilty by reason of insanity	
Gilbert, Kristen	1989–1996	4	4+	Sentenced to life imprisonment	Induced cardiac arrest in patients and would then respond to the coded emergency, often resuscitating the patients herself	
Giles, Bernard	1973	5	5	Sentenced to life imprisonment	Abducted, raped and murdered female hitchhikers in orange groves near Titusville, Florida	
Gillis, Sean Vincent	1994–2004	8	8	Sentenced to life imprisonment	Stalked, kidnapped, raped, murdered, and mutilated Louisiana women	
Gilyard, Lorenzo	1977–1993	6	13+	Sentenced to life imprisonment	Known as "The Kansas City Strangler"; targeted mostly sex workers in and around Kansas City, Missouri	
Glatman, Harvey	1957–1958	3	4	Executed 1959	Known as "The Glamour Girl Slayer" and "The Lonely Hearts Killer"; posed as a professional photographer in California to lure his victims with the promise of a modeling career before binding them and sexually assaulting them and photographing then murdering them	
Glaze, Billy	1986–1987	3	20+	Died in prison	Guilt has come into question by the discovery of DNA evidence excluding Glaze and implicating another man	
Gleason, Robert Charles	2007–2010	3	3+	Executed 2013	Killed two fellow inmates while serving a life sentence for another murder, and vowed to keep killing if he was not put to death	
Goble, Sean Patrick	1994–1995	4	4+	Sentenced to life imprisonment	Known as "The Interstate Killer"; truck driver who kidnapped and murdered prostitutes along various highways	
Gollehon, William	1985–1991	7	7	Sentenced to death	Convicted of killing a woman, then killed six inmates in prison	
Gomez, Lloyd	1950–1951	9	9	Executed 1953	Known as "The Phantom Hobo Killer"; murdered nine homeless men across California	
Gordon, Steven Dean	2013–2014	4	5	Sentenced to death	Sex offender who raped and strangled prostitutes in Santa Ana and Anaheim, California, aided by accomplice Franc Cano	
Gore, David Alan	1981–1983	6	6	Executed 2012	One of the pair known as "The Killing Cousins"; murdered women in Vero Beach and Indian River County, Florida, with the aid of his cousin Fred Waterfield	
Gosnell, Kermit	1989–2010	4+	200+	Died in prison	A former abortion doctor who ran a Philadelphia abortion clinic, where authorities found remains of 47 late-term aborted and born-alive children. Gosnell was convicted in the death of three born-alive children and an abortion recipient, though staff testimony indicated hundreds of cases of children born alive during abortion procedures and then killed by Gosnell.	
Goudeau, Mark	2005–2006	9	9	Sentenced to death	Known as "The Baseline Killer"; a serial kidnapper, rapist, thief, and serial killer that terrorized the Phoenix metro area	
Graham, Gwendolyn	1987	5	5	Sentenced to life imprisonment	Accomplice of Cathy Wood; nurse's aide that preyed on elderly women in a Walker, Michigan nursing home	
Graham, Harrison	1986–1987	7	7	Sentenced to life imprisonment	Murdered seven women in Philadelphia and kept their remains in his apartment	
Grant, Gary	1969–1971	4	4	Sentenced to life imprisonment	Killed three children and a young woman in Renton, Washington	
Grant, Waldo	1973–1976	4	4+	Died in prison	Murdered four gay men in New York City	
Granviel, Kenneth	1974–1975	7	9	Executed 1996	Raped and stabbed women and children in Fort Worth, Texas, in sexually motivated attacks	
Grate, Shawn	2006–2016	5	5	Sentenced to death	Murdered women in rural Ohio	
Gray, Dana Sue	1994	3	3	Sentenced to life imprisonment	Preyed on elderly women, murdering three; caught after a fourth intended victim survived and identified her	
Gray, Marvin	1971–1992	3	41	Died in prison	Most dangerous prisoner in Colorado until his death; confessed to the murders of forty-one people across eight different states	
Gray, Ricky Javon	2005–2006	8	8	Executed 2017	Killed his wife in Pennsylvania, then went on a killing spree in Virginia with his cousin, Ray Dandridge	
Gray, Ronald	1986–1987	4	4	Sentenced to death	Soldier who raped and murdered women near Fort Bragg	
Green, Larry	1973–1974	15	73+	Sentenced to life imprisonment	Part of "The Death Angels", group responsible for the Zebra murders	
Green, Ricky Lee	1985–1986	4	12	Executed 1997	Bisexual drifter; his wife helped in two of the murders	
Green, Samuel	1817–1821	3	3+	Executed 1822	Known as "The Terror of New England"; robbed and murdered various people across New England and Canada with accomplice William Ash	
Greenawalt, Randy	1974–1978	7	9	Executed 1997	Killed at least one man in January 1974; later escaped from prison with another inmate, killing a family of four and a couple in Arizona and Colorado	
Greenwell, Harry Edward	1987–1989	3	3	Died before apprehension	Known as the "I-65 Killer"; posthumously linked to murders of motel clerks along Interstate 65	
Greenwood, Vaughn	1964–1975	11	11	Died in prison	Known as "The Skid Row Slasher"; preyed mainly on transients and the homeless in Southern California	
Grinder, James B.	1976–1984	4	4	Died in prison	Murdered three girls in Arkansas; later murdered a woman in Missouri	
Grissom, Richard	1977–1989	4	5	Sentenced to life imprisonment	Killed three women in Johnson County, Kansas, after having been released from prison for a previous murder; the bodies of his latter victims have yet to be found	
Groves, Vincent	1978–1988	7	20+	Died in prison	Raped and strangled prostitutes in Denver and the surrounding areas	
Guerrero, Jose	1995–1998	3	3	Sentenced to death	Raped, shot, and strangled women in Madera, California	
Gunness, Belle	1900–1908	14	14+	Unknown	Norwegian-born murder-for-profit killer who killed her suitors and children	
Hahn, Anna Marie	1933–1937	5	5	Executed 1938	German-born murder-for-profit killer who poisoned five elderly men	
Halbower, Rodney	1976	3	5	Sentenced to life imprisonment	Suspect in the Gypsy Hill killings	
Hall, James Waybern	1938–1945	4	24+	Executed 1946	Killed his wife in 1944 and three other men while hitchhiking in 1945. Confessed to 20 or more murders	
Halliday, Lizzie	1891–1906	4	8+	Died in Matteawan State Hospital for the Criminally Insane	Irish immigrant who killed three people in Upstate New York. While incarcerated at Matteawan State Hospital for the Criminally Insane, she killed a hospital attendant. First woman sentenced to be executed by the electric chair; commuted to a life sentence in a mental institution after a medical commission declared her insane.	
Hammond, Andrew	2020–2022	3	3	Sentenced to life imprisonment	Shot three people to death in Fresno, California between 2020 and 2022	
Hampton, T. J.	1887–1893	5	5	Executed 1901	Drifter who murdered five people across three states	
Hance, William Henry	1977–1978	4	4	Executed 1994	Known as "The Forces of Evil"; United States Army soldier who murdered four women on and around military bases	
Hancock, Phillip Dean	1982–2001	3	3	Executed 2023	Killed three men during drug-related disputes in Oklahoma	
Hankins, Terry	2000–2001	5	5	Executed 2009	Mansfield, Texas man who murdered members of his own family	
Hansen, Robert	1971–1983	17	37	Died in prison	Known as "The Butcher Baker"; abducted, raped, and murdered women in and around Anchorage, Alaska. Hansen released many of his victims into the Alaskan wilderness after abducting them and hunted them with a semi-automatic rifle and a knife.	
Harpe Brothers	1797–1804	39	50+	Lynched 1799 (Micajah) Executed 1804 (Wiley)	Brothers or cousins; America's first known serial killers	
Harris, DeWayne Lee	1997–1998	3	3+	Sentenced to 94 years in prison	Known as "The Seattle Jungle Killer"; strangled prostitutes in Seattle, dumping their bodies in an area known as 'The Jungle'	
Harris, Michael Darnell	1981–1982	4	10	Sentenced to life imprisonment	Raped, beat and strangled elderly women across Michigan; claims to be innocent	
Harris, Robert Alton	1975–1978	3	3	Executed 1992	Killed his brother's roommate; after release, robbed and killed two brothers	
Harris, Robert Wayne	1999–2000	6	6	Executed 2012	Killed a woman whom he suspected of stealing money from him, then killed five of his former coworkers three days after he was fired	
Harris, Warren	1977	3	4	Released in 2024	Known as "The French Quarter Stabber"; attacked and stabbed people in homophobic attacks in New Orleans	
Harrison, Kenneth	1967–1969	4	4	Committed suicide in prison	Known as "The Giggler"; murdered people around Boston due to homicidal urges, and later called the police to inform of his crimes	
Harrison, Lester	1951–1973	5	7	Unknown	Murdered prison inmate; after release, raped and murdered women in Chicago's Grant Park	
Harvey, Donald	1970–1987	37	80	Murdered in prison by fellow inmate	Known as "The Angel of Death"; hospital orderly who murdered patients in Ohio and Kentucky	
Hassell, George	1917–1926	13	13	Executed 1928	Annihilated his family on two separate occasions	
Hatcher, Charles Ray	1969–1982	5	16	Committed suicide in prison	Convicted of two child murders in 1978 and 1982, also stabbed to death a fellow inmate and another man 20 years apart	
Hausner, Dale	2006	8	8	Committed suicide prior to execution	Accomplice of Samuel Dieteman. Convicted of killing people in random drive-by shootings in Phoenix, Arizona	
Hayes, Robert	2005–2006	3	7+	Sentenced to life imprisonment	Known as "The Daytona Beach Killer"; assaulted and shot three women in Florida. DNA tests have linked him to a fourth murder committed in 2016	
Hayter, John Price	1953–1986	3	3	Died in prison	Drifter who killed a fellow prisoner and two women in Texas and Florida	
Hazzard, Linda	1908–1911	15	15+	Died in 1938	Known as the "Starvation Doctor"; quack doctor and swindler who promoted fasting, pummeling and hours-long enemas as treatments. In 1911, she was found guilty of manslaughter in the state of Washington and was sentenced to two to twenty years of hard labor for killing at least fifteen people for financial gain at a sanitarium she operated near Seattle. Released on parole after only serving two years and later, for unknown reasons, received a full pardon from Governor Ernest Lister in 1916. Hazzard died after subjecting herself to her treatment methods.	
Hearn, John Wayne	1985	3	3	Sentenced to life imprisonment	Murdered three men for insurance money	
Heirens, William	1945–1946	3	3	Died in prison	Known as "The Lipstick Killer"; Illinois teenager convicted of the murder of three Chicago women in the 1940s	
Helm, Boone	1850–1864	11	11+	Executed 1864	Known as "The Kentucky Cannibal"; mountain man and Old West gunfighter who murdered and partially consumed his victims throughout the American West	
Henley, Elmer Wayne	1970–1973	7	7	Sentenced to life imprisonment	Crimes referred to as "The Houston Mass Murders"; accomplice of Dean Corll, whom he later killed in self-defense	
Henry, John Ruthell	1975–1985	3	3	Executed 2014	Murdered his first wife in Dade City in 1975; paroled, and later murdered his second wife and stepson	
Hernandez, Alexander	2014	5	5	Sentenced to life imprisonment	Shot five people to death during a series of random drive-by shootings in California.	
Hernandez, Ramon Torres	1994–2001	3	5+	Executed 2012	Kidnapped and murdered women in Bexar County, Texas	
Herzog, Loren	1984–1999	3	19	Committed suicide prior to release	With accomplice Wesley Shermantine, known as "The Speed Freak Killers"	
Heuermann, Rex	1993–2010	8	8+	Sentenced to life imprisonment	Committed the Gilgo Beach serial killings	
Hickey, J. Frank	1883–1911	3	3	Died in prison	Known as "The Postcard Killer"; poisoned a coworker with laudanum in Massachusetts and strangled two young boys in New York	
Hickey, Michael J.	1976–1977	4	4	Released in 1999	Murdered and mutilated a 15-year-old girl who reported his friend to the police for drug possession, and later killed three people in a bombing at the behest of Mark Hopkinson	
Hicks, James Rodney	1977–1996	3	3	Murdered three women starting with his wife	One of Maine's only known serial killers	
Hickson, Monroe	1946	4	4	Died while a fugitive	Known as "Bluecorns"; murdered shopkeepers around Aiken County, South Carolina	
Hill, Clarence	1938–1940	6	6	Sentenced to life imprisonment; released in 1964	Attacked couples at lovers' lanes in Duck Island, New Jersey, and the surrounding area between 1938 and 1942	
Hill, Ivan	1979–1994	9	9+	Sentenced to death	Known as "The 60 Freeway Killer"; responsible for at least one of the Southside Slayer murders	
Hill, Walter	1952–1977	5	5	Executed 1997	Killed three people after serving time for two separate murders	
Hilton, Gary	2007–2008	4	4+	Sentenced to death	Known as "The National Forest Serial Killer"; abducted and killed hikers in national forests across three states	
Hinton, Ronald	1996–1999	3	3	Sentenced to life imprisonment	With two accomplices, strangled three women in the Rogers Park neighborhood of Chicago	
Hittle, Daniel	1973–1989	7	7	Executed 2000	Killed his adoptive parents in Minnesota; paroled, and later killed five others in Texas during a shooting spree	
Hodges, Henry Eugene	1988–1990	3	8	Sentenced to death	Convicted of three murders of homosexual men in Georgia and Tennessee. Confessed to at least eight murders of homosexual men in total.	
Holman, Richard	1978–1979	4	9+	Sentenced to life imprisonment	Accomplice of Girvies Davis; killed people during robberies since eliminating witnesses was "easier" than wearing a mask	
Holmes, H. H.	1891–1894	9	27+	Executed 1896	Convicted of only one murder, but definitively tied to at least eight more; confessed to a total of 27	
Hooker, John Michael	1971–1988	3	3	Executed 2003	Killed a guest at a house party; later stabbed to death his common-law wife and her mother	
Honken, Dustin Lee	1993	5	5	Executed 2020	Drug dealer who killed witnesses against him and their children with the help of his girlfriend, Angela Johnson	
Hopewell, Raymont	1999–2005	5	5	Sentenced to life imprisonment	Attacked elderly residents of Baltimore, Maryland	
Hopkins, John W.	1972–1978	3	3+	Committed suicide in prison	Known as "The Mohawk Ripper"; abducted, raped and stabbed college students in the Mohawk Valley region	
Housel, Tracy	1985	3	17	Executed 2002	Killed at least three people during a six-week crime spree across four states	
Howell, William Devin	2003	7	7	Sentenced to life imprisonment	Convicted of killing seven women in 2003; believed to be the most prolific serial killer in Connecticut history	
Hoyt, Waneta	1965–1971	5	5	Died in prison	New York woman who murdered her five children; exonerated under New York law because she died before her appeal	
Hughes, Mervin Ray	1986–1999	3	4+	Sentenced to death	Known as "The Serial Shooter"; killed two people and injured ten others during a shooting spree in Oakland, after having been released from prison for a previous shooting death	
Hughes, Michael	1986–1993	7	7+	Sentenced to death	Responsible for at least one of the Southside Slayer murders	
Hughes, Philip Joseph	1972–1975	3	3+	Sentenced to life imprisonment	Killed three women with his ex-wife in Contra Costa County, California	
Hunter, Bert Leroy	1968–1988	3	3	Executed 2000	Murdered a tavern owner; later paroled and murdered an elderly woman and her son with an accomplice	
Hunter, Felando	2012	4	4	Sentenced to life imprisonment	Murdered two men and two teenage boys during robberies in Detroit	
Hunter, Demorris	1985–2002	3	3	Sentenced to life imprisonment in California, and the death penalty in Florida	Murdered one victim in 1985, and two more women in 2002	
Hunter, Richard Louis	1986	4	4	Sentenced to life imprisonment	Raped and strangled elderly women in Atlanta	
Huntsman, Megan	1996–2006	6	6	Sentenced to 30 years to life	Pleasant Grove, Utah woman who strangled six of her newborn children	
Hyatt, Terry	1979–1987	3	3+	Sentenced to death	Kidnapped, raped and murdered women across North Carolina	
Ingle, Phillip Lee	1991	4	4	Executed 1995	Murdered two elderly couples in North Carolina for no apparent reason	
Irvin, Leslie	1954–1955	6	6+	Died in prison	His Supreme Court case set a precedent for fair trials of highly publicized defendants	
Irvin, Marvin	1979–1990	3	3	Sentenced to life imprisonment	Former police officer who murdered women in St. Joseph, Missouri	
Jablonski, Phillip Carl	1978–1991	5	5	Died in prison awaiting execution	Murdered women in California and Utah	
Jackson, Anthony	1972	3	7	Sentenced to life imprisonment	Known as "The Hitchhike Murderer"; raped and murdered women, often college students, who hitchhiked around the Greater Boston area	
Jackson, Calvin	1973–1974	9	9	Sentenced to life imprisonment	Murdered and robbed women in Manhattan's East Side, abusing their corpses post-mortem	
Jackson, Charles	1975–1982	8	8+	Died in prison	Responsible for at least eight of the East Bay Slayer murders	
Jackson, Freddrick	2020–2022	4	4	Sentenced to 50 years in prison	Shot four men to death in Arkansas	
Jackson, Homer	1983–1993	4	4+	Died in 2023 after release in 2022	Raped and strangled prostitutes across Portland, Oregon; case noted for messy trial and questionable evidence	
Jackson, Mary Jane	1856–1861	4	4	Sentenced to 10 years in prison; freed after nine months	Known as "Bricktop"; prostitute who murdered four men in New Orleans	
Jackson, Ray	1989–1990	6	6	Sentenced to life imprisonment	Known as the "Gillham Park Strangler"; murdered six sex workers in Kansas City, Missouri.	
Jackson, Vickie Dawn	2000–2001	10	10+	Sentenced to life imprisonment	Poisoned patients in Nocona, Texas, with Mivacron	
Jackson, William Perry	1980	5	5	Sentenced to life imprisonment	Together with two accomplices, killed five people during robberies in Oregon and Washington	
Jennings, Desmond Domnique	1993	5	20	Executed 1999	Killed people in drug-related robberies in Fort Worth, Texas	
Jennings, Wilbur Lee	1981–1984	6	6+	Died in prison awaiting execution	Known as "The Ditchbank Killer"; raped and murdered women in Fresno and Sacramento County, California, dumping their bodies in ditches afterwards	
Jesperson, Keith Hunter	1990–1995	8	8+	Sentenced to life imprisonment	Known as "The Happy Face Killer"; truck driver who murdered at least eight women across multiple states	
Johansen, William	1933–1940	3	3	Executed 1941	Sea merchant who murdered and mutilated three women, including his wife, in New York and California.	
Johnson, Alvin	1972–1983	3	3	Died in prison	Transient who killed people during alcoholic binges; one murder committed with Wilbur Lee Jennings	
Johnson, Brandon Dewayne	2008–2009	3	3	Sentenced to 100 years in prison	Killed three men during robberies in Little Rock, Arkansas	
Johnson, Cecil	1980–1985	4	4	Executed 2009	Killed three people during a robbery in Nashville, Tennessee in 1980, and a fellow death row prisoner at Tennessee State Prison in 1985	
Johnson, Matthew Steven	2000–2001	3	5	Sentenced to life imprisonment	Preyed on disenfranchised young women in Connecticut	
Johnson, Melvin	1984–1988	4	4+	Died in prison	Sex offender posthumously linked to sexually motivated murders in Decatur, Illinois	
Johnson, Michael	2008–2010	4	4+	Sentenced to 190 years in prison	Responsible for the murders of four sex workers in Chicago	
Johnson, Milton	1983–1984	10	10+	Died in prison	Committed what was called The Weekend Murders in Will County, Illinois. Victims included two deputy sheriffs	
Johnson, Raymond Eugene	1995–2007	3	3	Executed 2026	Murdered an acquaintance; paroled, and later killed his ex-girlfriend and her infant daughter	
Johnson, Vincent	1999–2000	5	6	Sentenced to life imprisonment	Known as "The Brooklyn Strangler"; preyed on sex workers in and around New York City	
Jones, Andre Vernell	1978–1979	5	8	Sentenced to death; commuted to life imprisonment	Murdered a couple, then murdered three more people on the same day with Freddie Tiller	
Jones, Daniel O.	1998–2001	4	4	Sentenced to life imprisonment	Stabbed young women to death during home invasions in Kansas City, Missouri	
Jones, Genene	1977–1982	2	60+	Sentenced to 99 years in prison	Texas pediatric nurse who poisoned infants in her care; was due to be released March 2018; however, prosecutors charged her with two additional murders	
Jones, George Lamar	1972–1997	3	3+	Died in prison	Drug addict who strangled prostitutes in Milwaukee, Wisconsin	
Jones, Jack Harold	1983–1995	3	3+	Executed 2017	Murdered at least three women in Florida and Arkansas; a serial rapist was wrongfully convicted for one murder	
Jones, Syd	1900s–1914	13	13	Executed 1915	Drifter who admitted to a dozen murders committed across the U.S.	
Jones, Willie Ben	1980–1990	3	4	Sentenced to 60 years in prison	Killed sex workers because "they had to be punished"	
Joubert, John	1982–1983	3	3	Executed 1996	Known as "The Nebraska Boy Snatcher"; murdered young boys in Maine and Nebraska	
Joyner, Anthony	1983	6	18	Sentenced to life imprisonment	Raped and killed elderly women at the Philadelphia nursing home he worked at	
Junco, Francisco del	1995–1996	4	4	Sentenced to life imprisonment	Cuban immigrant who murdered and then burned the bodies of prostitutes in Miami	
Kadamovas, Jurijus	2001–2002	5	5	Sentenced to death; commuted to life imprisonment	Accomplice of Iouri Mikhel; Lithuanian immigrant who kidnapped five people for ransom money in California and killed them	
Kallinger, Joseph	1974–1975	3	3	Died in prison	Committed crimes with his 15-year-old son Michael Kallinger	
Kaczynski, Ted	1978–1995	3	3	Committed suicide in prison	Nicknamed the 'Unabomber', Kaczynski murdered three individuals and injured twenty-three others in a nationwide mail bombing campaign against people he believed to be advancing modern technology and the destruction of the natural environment.	
Kaprat, Edwin	1991–1993	6	6	Murdered in prison by fellow inmates	Known as "The Granny Killer"; robbed, murdered and set fire to the homes of his victims in Hernando County, Florida, most of whom were elderly women	
Kearney, Patrick	1965–1977	21	43	Sentenced to life imprisonment	Known as "The Trash Bag Killer"; necrophile and sadist who targeted young men and boys in Southern California	
Kee, Arohn	1991–1998	3	3+	Sentenced to life imprisonment	Known as the "East-Harlem Rapist"; raped seven women in Manhattan from 1991 to 1998, killing three of them	
Keith, Leroy	1934–1956	3	3	Executed 1959	Shot three men during holdups in Ohio and New York	
Kehoe, Chevie	1995–1996	4	4	Sentenced to life imprisonment	White supremacist terrorist who killed fellow white supremacist and later killed a family of three with accomplice Daniel Lewis Lee	
Kelley, John William	1986–1988	3	3	Sentenced to life imprisonment	Convicted rapist who killed a young hitchhiker and a married couple in rural California	
Kelly, Alvin Andrew	1984	4	4	Executed 2008	Killed a family of three and later his roommate during robberies	
Kelly Family	1887	11	11	Killed by vigilantes	Family of serial killers who killed and robbed wealthy travellers in No Man's Land	
Kemper, Edmund	1964–1973	10	10	Sentenced to life imprisonment	Known as "The Co-Ed Killer"; murdered his grandparents at age 15; released at age 21, he then murdered six young women, as well as his mother and her friend, in California	
Keyes, Israel	1990s–2012	3	11+	Committed suicide in custody	Three confirmed victims; linked to eleven victims in four states	
Kibbe, Roger	1977–1987	8	8+	Murdered in prison by fellow inmate	Known as "The I-5 Strangler"; murdered young women picked up on the freeways around Sacramento, California	
Kimball, Scott Lee	2003–2004	4	5+	Sentenced to 70 years in prison	FBI Informant; proposed as a suspect in the West Mesa murders	
Kinne, Sharon	1962–1964	3	3	Died in 2022 after escape in 1969	Her arrest warrant is one of the longest outstanding in American history	
Kennedy, Edward Dean	1978–1981	3	3	Executed 1992	Killed a man during a robbery; killed two men, including a police officer, after escaping	
Kirkland, Anthony	1987–2009	5	5	Sentenced to death	Preyed on young women in the Cincinnati area	
Klimek, Tillie	1914–1921	5	7	Died in prison	Polish-born Chicago poisoner	
Knapp, Alfred	1894–1902	5	5+	Executed 1904	Known as "The Hamilton Strangler"; murdered women and girls in Ohio and Indiana	
Knight, Thomas	1974–1980	4	4	Executed 2014	Murdered four people between 1974 and 1980	
Knighton, Robert Wesley	1973–1990	5	5	Executed 2003	Embarked on a two-state killing spree with his girlfriend and a teenage friend after serving time for killing a man	
Knowles, Paul John	1974	18	35	Killed by police	Known as "The Casanova Killer"	
Koedatich, James	1971–1982	4	4	Sentenced to death; commuted to life imprisonment	Killed a man and a cellmate in Florida, he went on to kill two others in New Jersey	
Kohlhepp, Todd	2003–2016	7	7+	Sentenced to life imprisonment	Responsible for several murders in South Carolina, including the "Superbike Murders".	
Kokoraleis, Andrew	1981–1982	18	18	Executed 1999	Brothers and members of the organized crime group known as "The Ripper Crew" or "The Chicago Rippers"	
Kokoraleis, Thomas	1981–1982	18	18	Released in 2019	Brothers and members of the organized crime group known as "The Ripper Crew" or "The Chicago Rippers"	
Koster, Brent Eugene	1972	3	3	Released in 2020	Teenage accomplice of Danny Ranes, who actively participated in three of his four murders	
Kraft, Randy	1971–1983	16	67	Sentenced to death	Known as "The Scorecard Killer"; kept a coded list of young men and boys that he raped and murdered in Southern California, Michigan and Oregon	
Krajcir, Timothy	1977–1982	9	9	Sentenced to life imprisonment	Confessed to killing five women in Missouri and four others in Illinois and Pennsylvania	
Kudzinowski, Peter	1924–1928	3	3	Executed 1929	Imprisoned for the murder of a friend. Murdered two children following his release	
Ladd, Robert Charles	1978–1996	4	4	Executed 2015	Killed a woman and three children in Dallas; paroled and later killed another woman in Tyler	
Lagrone, Edward	1976–1991	4	6	Executed 2004	Murdered an acquaintance; later killed a 10-year-old girl he had impregnated and two of her great-aunts	
Lake, Leonard	1983–1985	11	25	Committed suicide in custody	With accomplice Charles Ng, they are also known as "The Operation Miranda Killers"	
LaLaurie, Delphine	1834	2	14+	Died in Paris, France	New Orleans socialite who tortured and maimed her slaves	
Lannon, Sean	2021	5	16	Sentenced to 95 years in prison	Killed at least five people in New Jersey and New Mexico, including his ex-wife	
LaRette, Anthony	1976–1980	16	31	Executed 1995	Drifter who stalked, raped and stabbed to death women in multiple states	
Lassor, Raymond	1984	3	3	Sentenced to life imprisonment	First criminal to be successfully prosecuted under the 1984 Rhode Island 'Life Without Parole Statute'	
Laudenberg, Adolph	1972–1975	4	6	Died in prison	Known as "The Santa Strangler"; murdered women in the San Pedro neighborhood of Los Angeles and one in San Francisco, and is the prime suspect for two similar murders	
Lee, Daniel Lewis	1990–1996	4	4	Executed 2020	Neo-Nazi terrorist who killed man during a robbery; after release, he killed a family of three with accomplice Chevie Kehoe	
Lee, Derrick Todd	1992–2003	7	7+	Died in prison awaiting execution	Known as "The Baton Rouge Serial Killer"; convicted of two murders; linked by DNA evidence to five others	
Lehr, Scott Alan	1991–1992	3	4+	Sentenced to death	Known as "Baby Seat Rapist"; convicted of three murders	
Levins, Benjamin	1926–1927	9	10	Executed 1927	Killed at least nine people, including from two families, in Tampa, Florida	
Lewingdon, Gary	1977–1978	10	10	Died in prison	Known as "The .22 Caliber Killers"	
Lewingdon, Thaddeus	1977–1978	9	9	Died in prison	Known as "The .22 Caliber Killers"	
Liberty, Robert	1966–1970	3	3	Murdered by inmate while awaiting trial	Known as "The Candlelight Killer"; murdered his girlfriend and later two men in ritualistic style	
Lindahl, Bruce	1974–1981	4	12+	Died from accidental self-inflicted injuries	Posthumously connected to various rape-murders in DuPage County through DNA	
Lindsey, William Darrell	1988–1996	7	25	Died in prison	Murdered seven prostitutes in Florida and North Carolina	
Lipscomb, Nathaniel	1958–1959	3	4	Executed 1961	Known as "The Dawn Strangler"; beat, raped and strangled three women in Baltimore	
Little, Jerry	1985–1988	4	4	Died in prison	Raped and strangled women in St. Louis, Missouri	
Little, Samuel	1970–2005	61	93+	Died in prison	Known as "The Choke-and-Stroke Killer"; transient who allegedly killed ninety-three women in fourteen states	
Lockett, Will	1912–1920	4	4	Executed 1920	Lockett's trial resulted in an averted race riot and attempted lynching that was stopped when the police and National Guard opened fire on the lynch mob	
Lockhart, Michael Lee	1987–1988	4	6+	Executed 1997	Received death sentences in three states; executed by the state of Texas	
Long, David Martin	1978–1986	5	7	Executed 1999	Killed men and women in personal disputes in Texas and California	
Long, Bobby Joe	1984	10	10+	Executed 2019	Known as "The Classified Ad Rapist"; serial rapist who kidnapped, assaulted and murdered women in Florida's Tampa Bay area	
Long, Neal	1972–1975	4	7+	Died in prison	Known as "The Shotgun Slayer"; racist who murdered black people in drive-by shootings in Dayton, Ohio	
Lucas, David Allen	1979–1984	3	6	Sentenced to death	Murdered five women and one boy around San Diego County, California, by slashing their throats	
Lucas, Henry Lee	1960–1983	3	3+	Died in prison	Convicted of eleven murders, confessed to approximately 3,000 murders, although most of his confessions are considered outlandish	
Lunz, Christopher	2003–2009	3	20	Committed suicide in prison	Murdered his father; killed his cellmate and confessed to killing a fugitive sex offender	
Lyles, Anjette	1952–1958	4	4	Died in a mental hospital	American restaurateur responsible for the poisoning deaths of four relatives in Macon, Georgia, apprehended on May 6, 1958, and sentenced to death yet later was involuntarily committed due to her diagnosis of paranoid schizophrenic	
Lynch, Franklin	1987	3	13	Sentenced to death; commuted to life imprisonment	Known as "The Day Stalker"; preyed on elderly women in the East Bay, California	
Macek, Richard	1974	3	3+	Committed suicide in prison	Known as "The Mad Biter"; killed two women and one girl in sexually motivated attacks in Wisconsin and Illinois	
Madison, Michael	2012–2013	3	3+	Sentenced to death	Preyed on women in East Cleveland, Ohio	
Mailhot, Jeffrey	2003–2004	3	3	Sentenced to life imprisonment	Known as "The Rhode Island Ripper"; murdered and dismembered prostitutes in Woonsocket.	
Majors, Orville Lynn	1993–1995	6	130	Died in prison	Licensed practical nurse who was convicted of murdering his patients in Clinton, Indiana	
Malveaux, John Peter	1997	4	4	Sentenced to life imprisonment	Raped and strangled women around Opelousas, Louisiana	
Malvo, Lee Boyd	2002	7	17	Life imprisonment without parole (overturned on May 26, 2017); Supreme Court of the United States heard the case on October 16, 2019	With accomplice John Allen Muhammad, perpetrated the D.C. sniper attacks	
Mansfield, Billy	1975–1980	5	5+	Sentenced to life imprisonment	Murdered women and girls in Florida and California, burying most of them in the family home in Weeki Wachee with the aid of his father and younger brother	
Marcelin, Harvey	1963–2022	3	3	Sentenced to life imprisonment	Murdered three women in New York	
Marquette, Richard Laurence	1961–1975	3	3	Sentenced to life imprisonment	Oregon man who murdered three women, drained their blood, mutilated and dismembered their bodies. First 11th person named on the FBI's 10 Most Wanted List	
Martin, Deangelo Kenneth	2018–2019	4	6	Sentenced to 45–70 years in prison	Raped and murdered women in abandoned houses in Detroit.	
Martin, James David	1989–2005	3	3	Sentenced to 42–64 years in prison	Strangled three across three states, including his wife	
Martin, Nollie Lee	1972–1977	4	4	Executed 1992	Murdered a mother and her two daughters in North Carolina and murdered another woman in Florida.	
Martin, Lee Roy	1967–1968	4	4	Murdered in prison by fellow inmate	Known as "The Gaffney Strangler". Sexually assaulted and killed two women and two young girls in South Carolina. Stabbed to death by a fellow prison inmate in 1972	
Martin, Rhonda Belle	1926–1951	6	6	Executed 1957	Alabama woman who poisoned family members	
Masini, Frank	1991–1992	4	4	Sentenced to life imprisonment	Italian man who burglarized and murdered elderly people in New Jersey	
Mason, David	1980–1982	5	6	Executed 1993	Killed four elderly neighbours in 1980 and his cellmate in 1982 while imprisoned on lesser charges; suspected of shooting dead his boyfriend	
Massof, Steven	2003–2008	3	100+	Released in 2019	Accomplice of Kermit Gosnell	
Matthews, Eric	1994–1998	4	4	Sentenced to life imprisonment	Rapist who his killed ex-girlfriends, wife and stepson	
Matix, William	1985–1986	4	6	Killed by police	With accomplice Michael Lee Platt, killed two men during robberies and two FBI agents during a shootout in which both men were killed; also suspected of killing his wife and a female coworker in 1984	
Maupin, Thomas	1988–2001	3	3	Sentenced to 12 years	Itinerant criminal who killed an 8-year-old girl and two adult women in Washington and Tennessee	
Maury, Robert	1985–1987	3	3+	Sentenced to death	Known as "The Tipster Killer"; killed at least three women in California, then called into crime stoppers to report his crimes and receive award money	
Maust, David Edward	1974–2003	5	5	Committed suicide in prison	Convicted of killing five teenage boys; one in Germany in 1974, another in 1981, and three he buried in his basement	
Mayrand, Edward	1983–1994	3	3	Died in prison	Strangled three women in New England	
Mays, Reta	2017–2018	8	8+	Sentenced to life imprisonment	Nursing assistant who murdered seven elderly male military veterans with injections of insulin while employed at a VA hospital in Clarksburg, West Virginia	
McCarthy, Kimberly	1988–1997	3	3	Executed 2013	Robbed and killed elderly people to support her cocaine addiction	
McCoy, Stephen	1980–1981	3	3	Executed 1989	With his accomplice James Paster, the pair murdered three people in the Houston Area	
McCray, Jeremiah	1956–1958	5	5	Executed 1958	Itinerant laborer who killed elderly people during robberies	
McDuff, Kenneth	1966–1992	9	14+	Executed 1998	Known as "The Broomstick Killer"; death sentence for 1966 triple-murder commuted; began killing again three days after 1989 parole	
McFadden, Jerry Walter	1973–1986	4	4+	Executed 1999	Known as "The Animal"; murdered three people in Texas and posthumously linked to a previous murder in Oregon	
McFadden, Reginald	1969–1994	3	4+	Died in prison	Murdered an elderly woman as a teenager; later paroled and killed at least two people during a crime spree; his case greatly affected the parole system in both Pennsylvania and New York	
McGhee, Timothy	1997–2001	3	12	Sentenced to death	Known as "The Monster of Atwater", he is alleged to have been responsible for at least twelve homicides between 1997 and 2001, three of which led to convictions.	
McGregor, Edward George	1990–2006	4	4	Sentenced to life imprisonment	Raped, stabbed, and strangled women in Greater Houston	
McKnight, Anthony	1985	5	5	Died in prison awaiting execution	Rapist who killed young girls and women in Oakland, California; responsible for some of the East Bay Slayer murders	
McKnight, Gregory	1992–2000	3	3	Sentenced to death	Murdered three people in Ohio, burying the bodies of two on his property in Chillicothe afterwards	
McWatters, Eugene	2004	3	3	Died in prison	Known as "The Salerno Strangler"; Murdered women in Port Salerno, Florida	
Meach, Charles L.	1973–1982	5	5	Died in prison	Beat a grocery store clerk to death in Anchorage, Alaska, in 1973 and later shot four teenagers to death at a campsite in 1982	
Medellín, Jose	1993	3	3	Executed 2008	Member of the "Black and White" gang that kidnapped, raped, and murdered a woman and two teenage girls in a Texas	
Medley, Joseph Dunbar	1944–1945	3	3	Executed 1946	Robbed and murdered three women after absconding from prison while serving time for armed robbery	
Meirhofer, David	1967–1974	4	4	Committed suicide in custody	First serial killer to be apprehended via usage of offender profiling	
Melanson, Roy	1974–1988	3	5+	Died in prison	Drifter connected to the rape-murders of at least three women in three states	
Mendenhall, Bruce	2007	3	9+	Sentenced to life imprisonment	Known as "The Rest Stop Killer"; truck driver who abducted and murdered prostitutes across several states	
Metheny, Joe	1976–1996	5	10	Died in prison	Raped and murdered women in Baltimore, allegedly cannibalizing his victims	
Meza Jr., Raul	1982–2023	3	13+	Sentenced to life imprisonment	Raped and murdered an 8-year-old girl in 1982, later killed a woman in 2019 and his roommate in 2023; suspect in as many as ten other homicides	
Mikhel, Iouri	2001–2002	5	5	Sentenced to death; commuted to life imprisonment	Accomplice of Jurijus Kadamovas; Russian immigrant who kidnapped five people in California for ransom money and killed them	
Miller, Donald	1977–1981	5	5	Died in prison awaiting execution	Raped and murdered a co-ed in Long Beach; later bludgeoned to death gay men in Hollywood	
Miller, Donald Gene	1977–1978	4	4	Incarcerated	Raped and killed women in East Lansing, Michigan	
Miller, Joseph Daniel	1986–1990	5	5+	Sentenced to death; commuted to life imprisonment	Kidnapped, raped and strangled black women around Harrisburg, Pennsylvania	
Miller, Joseph Robert	1976–1993	6	6+	Sentenced to death; commuted to life imprisonment	Killed prostitutes in Chicago and Peoria, some after being paroled for murder	
Mills, Lawrence Paul	2017	3	4	Sentenced to 28–48 years in prison	Murdered two prostitutes and an unborn baby by running them over with his car in Detroit, Michigan	
Millsap, Bruce	1995–1996	8	8	Sentenced to death	Murdered victims during robberies committed across California	
Misch, David	1986–1989	3	4+	Sentenced to life imprisonment	Murdered a woman in 1989 and committed a double homicide in 1986; suspected in and awaiting trial for the murder of 9-year-old Michaela Garecht	
Mitchell, Roy	1922–1923	9	9	Executed 1923	Raped, robbed and murdered victims in Waco, Texas	
Moore, Manuel	1973–1974	15	73+	Died in prison	Part of "The Death Angels", group responsible for the Zebra murders	
Morin, Stephen	1969–1981	4	48	Executed 1985	Suspected in over thirty unsolved violent crimes across the country	
Morris, Cory	2002–2003	5	5+	Sentenced to death	Known as "The Crackhead Killer"; necrophile who murdered at least five prostitutes at his trailer in Phoenix, Arizona	
Morrison, Kelsie	1921–1922	3	3	Killed by police	Perpetrator of the Osage Indian murders; granted immunity in exchange for his testimony	
Mors, Frederick	1914–1915	8	8	Committed suicide to avoid arrest	Murdered eight elderly patients by poison while employed in a nursing home in New York City; committed to Hudson River State Hospital; escaped in May 1916	
Morse, Hugh	1959–1961	4	4+	Died in prison	Former fugitive who murdered four women during a cross-country crime spree	
Morton, David Bruce	1983–1990	3	3+	Sentenced to life imprisonment	Morton has also been considered a suspect in a series of highly publicized murders on young women in Santa Fe, New Mexico	
Mosley, Eddie	1973–1987	8	16+	Died in prison	Raped and murdered numerous young girls and women in and around Fort Lauderdale, Florida	
Motts, Jeffrey Brian	1995–2005	3	3	Executed 2011	Murdered a fellow inmate in 2005 while serving two life sentences for the 1995 murder of two relatives. Volunteered to be executed and waived his appeals	
Muehlberg, Gary	1990–1993	5	6+	Sentenced to life imprisonment	Known as "The Package Killer"; tortured and murdered prostitutes and one male acquaintance around St. Louis	
Muhammad, John Allen	2002	7	17	Executed 2009	With accomplice Lee Boyd Malvo, perpetrated the D.C. sniper attacks	
Mullin, Herbert	1972–1973	13	13	Died in prison	California schizophrenic who shot, stabbed and bludgeoned victims ranging in age from 4 to 72. Died in California Health Care Facility prison in 2022	
Mullins, Michael	1999–2012	3	3	Sentenced to life imprisonment	Murdered three women over the span of 13 years in Memphis, Tennessee	
Nance, Wayne	1974–1986	6	6+	Killed by intended victim	Known as "The Missoula Mauler"	
Nardello, Antonio	1884–1885	3	3	Executed 1886	Italian laborer who robbed and murdered other laborers in Maryland and Washington, D.C.	
Nash, Stephen	1955–1956	5	11	Executed 1959	Murdered at least five men and boys in California. Confessed to killing a total of 11 victims (all male).	
Naso, Joseph	1977–1994	6	10+	Sentenced to death	Murdered six women in California; suspect in the Alphabet murders	
Neal, William Lee	1998	3	3	Sentenced to death	Killed three women and raped a fourth woman in captivity after a long history of confidence tricks, domestic abuse, and abandonment of families.	
Nelson, Earle	1926–1927	22	29	Executed 1928	Known as "The Gorilla Man". Executed for a murder he committed in Canada	
Nemechek, Francis	1974–1976	5	5	Sentenced to life imprisonment	Raped and killed four women and a young boy in Kansas	
Newman, Allan Patterson	1991–1992	4	4	Died in prison	Murdered carjacking victims during a three-state crime spree	
Ng, Charles	1983–1985	11	25	Sentenced to death	With accomplice Leonard Lake, they are also known as "The Operation Miranda Killers"	
Nissensohn, Joseph	1981–1989	4	4+	Sentenced to death	Raped and murdered teenagers and women in California and Washington	
Nixon, Robert	1937–1938	3	5	Executed 1939	Known as the "Brick Moron"; confessed to five murders and multiple assaults in Los Angeles and Illinois; Nixon served, in part, as the basis of the character of Bigger Thomas in Richard Wright's 1940 social protest novel Native Son	
Noe, Marie	1949–1968	8	8	Died in 2016	Pennsylvania woman who murdered eight of her children; two others died of natural causes	
Normore, Mario	2017	4	4	Sentenced to life imprisonment	Murdered four acquaintances during robberies or arguments	
Norris, Roy	1979	5	5	Died in prison	With accomplice Lawrence Bittaker known as "Tool Box Killers"; kidnapped, sexually assaulted, tortured and murdered teenage girls in Los Angeles County, California	
Northcott, Gordon Stewart	1926–1928	3	20	Executed 1930	Canadian immigrant who was convicted of sexually assaulting and murdering three young boys in Wineville, California, in what become known as the Wineville Chicken Coop murders; his mother, Sarah Louise Northcott, was charged and convicted as an accomplice	
O'Brien, Derrick Sean	1993	3	3	Executed 2006	Member of the "Black and White" gang that kidnapped, raped, and murdered a woman and two teenage girls in a Texas	
Ocampo, Itzcoatl	2011–2012	6	6	Committed suicide in custody	Former marine suspected of killing six people around Orange County, California	
O'Dell, Diane	1982–1985	3	4	Sentenced to life imprisonment	Sullivan County, New York woman who murdered her illegitimate infants by asphyxiation	
Ortiz, Juan David	2018	4	4	Sentenced to life imprisonment	Border Patrol agent who shot four sex workers in Webb County, Texas and attempted to kill a fifth woman.	
Pace, Lyndon Fitzgerald	1988–1989	4	5	Sentenced to death	Robbed and murdered elderly women primarily in Atlanta's Vine City neighborhood. In 1990, he robbed the apartment of Coretta Scott King	
Page, Ivan	1998–2001	3	3	Sentenced to life imprisonment	Murdered prostitutes in Flint, Michigan	
Panzram, Carl	1920–1929	5	22	Executed 1930	Murderer, rapist, and arsonist; convicted of two murders, but confessed to nineteen others	
Pardo, Manuel	1986	9	9	Executed 2012	South Florida former police officer who acted in partnership with Rolando Garcia; the two claimed to be ridding the world of drug dealers	
Parker, Gerald	1978–1979	6	6	Sentenced to death	Known as "The Bedroom Basher"; Orange County, California man who raped and murdered five women. Parker was not identified until 1996	
Paster, James	1980–1981	3	5	Executed 1989	With accomplice Stephen McCoy, the pair murdered three people in the Houston Area. Paster confessed to two other murders for which he was never tried.	
Patton, Carl	1973–1977	5	5	Died in prison	Killed four acquaintances and one accomplice for money and to cover up his crimes	
Peete, Louise	1913–1944	3	3+	Executed 1947	Convicted of murdering a man and woman decades apart; four other acquaintances died suspiciously and four husbands committed suicide	
Penton, David Elliott	1984–1988	5	9+	Sentenced to life imprisonment	Child molester who abducted and murdered young children in Texas and Ohio	
Perkins, Reginald	1980–2000	3	6	Executed 2009	Murdered his stepmother in 2000 and two other women in Fort Worth in 1991. He also confessed to murdering another woman in Ohio in 1980 and is linked to two other murders in Cleveland	
Perry, Donna	1990	3	3+	Sentenced to life imprisonment	Formerly known as Douglas Perry prior to 2000 gender transition, which the prosecution claimed was an attempt to avoid suspicion. Targeted female sex workers in Spokane County, Washington	
Peterson, Christopher	1990	4	7	Sentenced to death; commuted to 120 years in prison	Known as "The Shotgun Killer"	
Petrocelli, Tracy	1981–1982	3	8+	Sentenced to death in Nevada; sentence overturned. Sentenced to life imprisonment in California and Washington.	Killed three people, including his girlfriend, between October 1981 and March 1982, and suspected in at least one or more murders.	
Pierce, William	1970–1971	9	9+	Died in prison	One of his victims was the daughter of a South Carolina state representative	
Pizzuto, Gerald	1985	4	4	Sentenced to death	He was convicted and sentenced to death in Idaho for a double murder, in addition to more than 69 years' jail for killing two more people in Washington	
Platt, Michael Lee	1985–1986	4	5	Killed by police	With accomplice William Matix, killed two men during robberies and two FBI agents during a shootout in which both men were killed; also suspected of killing his wife in 1984	
Player, Michael	1986	10	10	Committed suicide to avoid arrest	Known as "The Skid Row Slayer"; targeted mostly homeless individuals in the Skid Row neighborhood of Los Angeles	
Pough, James Edward	1971–1990	12	12	Committed suicide to avoid arrest	Killed a friend in 1971, then went on a shooting rampage in 1990	
Powers, Harry	1931	5	5+	Executed 1932	Known as "The West Virginia Bluebeard"; Dutch immigrant who lured victims through "lonely hearts" advertisements, murdering them for their money	
Presley, Aeman	2014	4	4	Sentenced to life imprisonment	Shot and killed people in DeKalb and Fulton Counties, Georgia during robberies	
Pressdee, Heather	2022–2023	3	17	Sentenced to life imprisonment	Nurse convicted of murdering three patients in her care and is suspected to have murdered an additional fourteen	
Price, Craig	1987–1989	4	4	Incarcerated	Convicted as a minor; given an additional 10–25 year sentence for assaulting a corrections officer in prison	
Price, Larme	2003	4	4	Sentenced to life imprisonment	Known as the "Thrill Killer"; murdered four immigrants in New York in revenge for the September 11 attacks	
Prieto, Alfredo	1988–1990	9	9	Executed 2015	Attacked mainly couples in Virginia and California, shooting them both after raping the women	
Prince Jr., Cleophus	1990	6	6	Sentenced to death	Known as "The Clairemont Killer"; raped and murdered women in San Diego County, California	
Pruett, Marion Albert	1981	5	5	Executed 1999	Committed his crimes while in the United States Federal Witness Protection Program	
Pruitt, Pleasant	1888–1902	3	3	Committed suicide to avoid arrest	Murdered his three wives in Indiana	
Puente, Dorothea	1982–1988	9	15	Died in prison	Murdered elderly and mentally disabled boarders in Sacramento, California, before cashing their Social Security checks; convicted of three killings, suspected of six others	
Queho	1909?–1919	13	23	Died while a fugitive	First Nevadan serial killer, found dead in cave five miles upriver from El Dorado Canyon. Cause of death uncertain.	
Rader, Dennis	1974–1991	10	10	Sentenced to life imprisonment	Known as "The BTK Killer"; killed men, women and children in Wichita and Park City, Kansas, while sending taunting letters to local police and media outlets	
Ralston, Larry	1975–1977	4	5+	Sentenced to death; commuted to life imprisonment	Abducted young women and teenage girls in Ohio	
Ramirez, Richard	1984–1985	15	15+	Died in prison awaiting execution	Known as "The Night Stalker"	
Ranes, Danny	1972	4	4	Died in prison	Kidnapped, raped and murdered women around Kalamazoo, Michigan, with teenage accomplice Brent Koster	
Rardon, Gary	1962–1974	4	4	Died in 2024 after release in 2020	Murdered a man whom he was hitchhiking with, then murdered three more men in a 4-day spree	
Rasmussen, Terry Peder	1978–2002	6	6+	Died in prison	Known as "The Chameleon Killer"; main suspect in the Bear Brook murders, as well as other murders	
Ray, Clifton	1987–1994	3	6+	Sentenced to life imprisonment	Responsible for the murders of three women in Kansas City, Missouri	
Red Dog, James Allen	1973–1991	5	5	Executed 1993	Killed four people personally; also provided a prison gang with a lethal dose of drugs so they could kill another inmate	
Reece, William Lewis	1997	4	4+	Sentenced to death	Kidnapped, raped and murdered teenage girls and young women in Texas and Oklahoma	
Reed, Todd Alan	1999	3	5	Sentenced to life imprisonment	Known as "The Forest Park Killer"; sex offender who raped and strangled three homeless women in Portland, Oregon	
Rees, Melvin	1957–1959	5	9+	Died in prison	Known as "The Sex Beast"	
Reeves, Jack	1967–1994	4	4	Sentenced to 99 years in prison	Killed his three wives after they planned to leave him; also killed a man while stationed in Italy	
Reid, Paul Dennis	1997	7	7	Died in prison awaiting execution	Known as "The Fast Food Killer"; committed seven murders during three fast-food restaurant robberies in Metropolitan Nashville and Clarksville, Tennessee	
Rembert, Robert	1997–2015	5	5+	Sentenced to life imprisonment	Truck driver who killed people across Ohio	
Reséndiz, Ángel Maturino	1986–1999	10	16	Executed 2006	Known as "The Railroad/Railway/Railcar Killer"; primarily murdered people in their homes near railroad tracks	
Respus, Asbury	1900s–1931	8	8+	Executed 1932	Serial killer active in North Carolina with no particular victim profile; victims' ages ranged from 8 to 80, both male and female, and both white and black; claimed that mental health episodes prompted him to commit random murders	
Rhoades, Robert Ben	1975–1990	4	50+	Sentenced to life imprisonment	Known as "The Truck Stop Killer"; truck driver who converted the sleeper cab of his truck into a torture chamber where he kept women, torturing and sexually assaulting them, before killing them	
Rice, Stanley	1963–1968	3	5+	Died in prison	Itinerant child molester who shot and killed young boys in Canada and the U.S.	
Rich, Darrell Keith	1978	4	4	Executed 2000	Known as "The Hilltop Rapist"; preyed on young women and girls in Redding, California	
Richards, Stephen D.	1876–1878	6	9+	Executed 1879	Known as "The Nebraska Fiend", Richards murdered six to nine people including a mother and her children. Suspected of additional murders.	
Richmond, Earl	1991	4	5	Executed 2005	Ex-Sergeant who raped and murdered four women in New Jersey and North Carolina	
Ridgway, Gary	1982–1998	49	90+	Sentenced to life imprisonment	Known as "The Green River Killer"; targeted sex workers and runaways in Washington	
Rifkin, Joel	1989–1993	9	17+	Sentenced to 203 years to life	Mostly preyed on sex workers in New York City and Long Island	
Rissell, Montie	1976–1977	5	5	Sentenced to life imprisonment	Raped and murdered women in Alexandria, Virginia	
Ritchie, James Dale	2016	5	5	Killed by police	Known as "The Anchorage Serial Killer"; shot people at random in parks or along bike paths in and around Anchorage, Alaska	
Rivera, Reinaldo	1999–2000	4	4	Sentenced to death	Abducted, raped and killed women in the Augusta metropolitan area	
Robbins, Malcolm	1979–1980	4	4+	Died in prison awaiting execution	Itinerant child molester who murdered young boys and teenagers in various states	
Robinson, Amos Earl	1983–2004	3	5+	Sentenced to life imprisonment	Along with accomplice Abron Scott, Robinson kidnapped and killed a man in Florida in 1983, and killed two prisoners in 1998 and 2004 respectively. Suspected of killing and raping two women in 1983.	
Robinson, Harvey Miguel	1992–1993	3	3	Sentenced to death	Teenager who stalked, raped and killed women in Allentown, Pennsylvania	
Robinson, John Edward	1984–1999	8	8+	Sentenced to death	Sometimes referred to as "The Internet's first serial killer"	
Robinson, John Wesley	1896–1913	3	3	Executed 1915	Murdered his girlfriend; later paroled and choked to death his wife and stepdaughter before dismembering their bodies	
Robinson, Sarah Jane	1881–1886	8	11	Died in prison	Known as "The Boston Borgia"; Irish-born poisoner who murdered family members and associates for profit in Massachusetts with the aid of accomplices Thomas R. Smith and Dr. Charles C. Beers	
Roche, John Francis	1953–1954	4	6	Executed 1956	Active primarily in the Yorkville neighborhood of Manhattan	
Rodriguez, Antonio	2010	3	3	Sentenced to life imprisonment	Known as "The Kensington Strangler"; raped and killed drug-addicted women in Kensington, Philadelphia	
Rodriguez, Robert Neal	1984–1992	3	3	Committed suicide to avoid arrest	Former police officer who murdered a woman and two teenage girls in Florida	
Rogers, Dayton Leroy	1983–1987	7	8+	Sentenced to death; commuted to life imprisonment	Known as "The Molalla Forest Killer"; raped and murdered sex workers in Oregon	
Rogers, Glen Edward	1993–1995	4	5	Executed 2025	Known as the "Casanova Killer"; murdered women across several states	
Rogers, Ramon	1993–1996	3	4	Sentenced to death	Murdered his roommate and two ex-girlfriends in San Diego, dismembering their remains post-mortem	
Rolling, Danny	1989–1990	8	8	Executed 2006	Pleaded guilty to murdering five students in Gainesville, Florida	
Ross, Michael Bruce	1981–1984	8	8+	Executed 2005	Known as "The Roadside Strangler"; sexually assaulted and murdered women and girls in Connecticut and New York	
Roye, Norman	1953–1954	3	3	Executed 1956	Known as "The Dreaded Strangler"; Manhattan youth who murdered women during home invasions	
Rozier, Robert	1981–1986	4	7	Serving 25 years to life on a conviction for check kiting under a third strike law	Former NFL player; sentenced to 22 years for murder after agreeing to testify against Yahweh ben Yahweh's organization	
Rulloff, Edward H.	1844–1870	3	5	Executed 1871	Known as "The Genius Killer"; Canadian-born doctor, lawyer, schoolmaster, photographer, inventor, carpet designer, phrenologist, philologist and career criminal active in New York. Rulloff's brain is said to be the second largest brain on record and is on display at the Wilder Brain Collection in the psychology department of Cornell University	
Rundle, David Allen	1986	3	3	Sentenced to death	Strangled young women and teenage girls in California's Sacramento and Placer counties	
Runge, Paul	1995–1997	7	8+	Sentenced to death; commuted to life imprisonment	Sexually assaulted and murdered women and one girl in Cook and DuPage counties in Illinois	
Russell, George Waterfield	1990	3	3	Sentenced to life imprisonment	Known as "The Charmer"; raped and murdered women in Seattle suburbs, mutilating and having sex with the corpses afterwards	
Saenz, Kimberly Clark	2008	5	10+	Sentenced to life imprisonment	Killed five patients by injecting bleach into their dialysis lines	
Saldivar, Efren	1988–1998	6	50+	Sentenced to life imprisonment	Respiratory therapist who murdered his patients at Adventist Health Glendale	
Samartaney, Malik	1991–2019	3	6	Sentenced to 41 years in prison	Killed one of his friends, his son, and his daughter	
Sanchez, Altemio	1990–2006	3	3+	Committed suicide in prison	Known as "The Bike Path Rapist"; responsible for three murders and numerous rapes spanning a 25-year period in Buffalo, New York	
Sanders, Martin Lee	1980–1983	4	4	Died in prison	Truck driver who sexually assaulted and murdered young women across Washington	
Sapp, William	1992–1993	3	3+	Sentenced to death	Rapist who murdered women and children around Springfield, Ohio	
Scarver, Christopher	1990–1994	3	3	Sentenced to life imprisonment	Murdered fellow inmates Jeffrey Dahmer and Jesse Anderson while serving life sentence for murder	
Schmid, Charles Howard	1964	3	4	Murdered in prison by fellow inmates	Known as "The Pied Piper of Tucson"; murdered three teenage girls in Arizona with the aid of local teenagers	
Scott, Abron	1983	3	3	Sentenced to life imprisonment	Along with accomplice Amos Robinson, Scott kidnapped and killed a man in Florida in 1983, and he also pleaded to killing and raping two women in 1983.	
Scott, Fredrick Demond	2016–2017	4	6	Convicted	Charged with the Indian Creek serial killings of five men and one woman. Convicted of four of these murders.	
Seda, Heriberto	1990–1993	3	3	Sentenced to life imprisonment	New York City copycat of the Zodiac Killer; selected his victims based on their astrological signs	
Sellers, Sean	1985–1986	3	3	Executed 1999	Only one of 22 juveniles executed in the United States in the modern era to have been executed for a crime committed under the age of 17	
Segundo, Juan	1986–1995	4	4+	Sentenced to death; commuted to life imprisonment	Raped and killed young girls and women in the Fort Worth area	
Sells, Tommy Lynn	1980–1999	6	22+	Executed 2014	Confessed to murdering dozens of people, possibly in excess of 70, only six are confirmed	
Seoung, Doeur	1985–1998	4	4	Sentenced to life imprisonment	Cambodian-born burglar who raped, strangled and robbed his victims, beginning when he was a teenager	
Severance, Charles	2003–2014	3	3	Sentenced to life imprisonment	Murdered elderly residents in Alexandria, Virginia, out of hatred for the rich	
Sharp, Michael Eugene	1982	3	5+	Executed 1997	Abducted, raped and killed women and children across West Texas	
Shaw, Sebastian	1991–1992	3	13	Died in prison	Murdered victims selected at random in Portland, Oregon; confessed to additional murders, including one in California	
Shawcross, Arthur	1972–1989	14	14	Died in prison	Known as "The Genesee River Killer"; raped and murdered two children in Watertown, New York in 1972. Paroled in 1987, he began murdering primarily sex workers in the Rochester area in 1988. Arrested in 1990.	
Sherman, Lydia	1863–1877	12	12	Died in prison	Known as "The Derby Poisoner"; poisoned eight children in her care, six of which were her own, and her three husbands in Connecticut and Rhode Island	
Shermantine, Wesley	1984–1999	4	19	Died in prison awaiting execution	With accomplice Loren Herzog, known as "The Speed Freak Killers"	
Shore, Anthony Allen	1986–1995	4	4+	Executed 2018	Known as "The Tourniquet Killer"; murdered three young girls and a young woman in Texas	
Shulman, Robert	1991–1996	5	5	Died in prison	Preyed on sex workers in New York	
Siebert, Daniel Lee	1979–1986	10	13	Died in prison awaiting execution	Killed nine people across America in three months; responsible for at least one of the Southside Slayer murders	
Sifuentes, Jose	1998–2003	3	3	Sentenced to life imprisonment	Strangled three women in Dallas; after posting bail he fled the country for sixteen years before he was re-apprehended in 2019	
Silva, Mauricio	1978–1984	4	4	Sentenced to death	Known as "The Monster"; killed an acquaintance as a teenager; paroled and went on to kill two teenage runaways and his half-sister	
Silveria Jr., Robert Joseph	1981–1996	9	30+	Sentenced to life imprisonment	Known as "The Boxcar Killer"; alleged member of Freight Train Riders of America	
Silverstein, Thomas	1981–1983	3	5	Died in prison	Aryan Brotherhood leader who killed two fellow inmates and a guard at USP Marion	
Simmons, Beoria	1981–1983	3	3	Sentenced to death; commuted to life imprisonment	Preyed on women and teenage girls in Jefferson County, Kentucky	
Simon, J.C.X.	1973–1974	15	73+	Died in prison	Part of "The Death Angels", group responsible for the Zebra murders	
Sims, Ray Dell	1974–1977	5	5+	Sentenced to life imprisonment	Raped and strangled teenage girls in Fresno	
Sinclair, Charles T.	1980–1990	13	13+	Died in prison	Known as "The Coin Shop Killer"; targeted coin shop owners in order to rob them of valuable coin collections	
Singh, Michael	1975–1982	3	3	Murdered in prison by a fellow inmate	Killed his girlfriend and two wives during violent outbursts	
Sitts, George Sidney	1945–1946	3	3	Executed 1947	Killed a man during a robbery; killed two police officers after escaping	
Six, Andrew Wessel	1984–1987	4	4	Executed 1997	Found guilty of the 1987 murder of 12-year-old Kathy Allen, who was kidnapped in Iowa and later murdered in Missouri; posthumously linked to a 1984 triple murder in Iowa	
Smallwood, Robert	1999–2006	3	3	Sentenced to life imprisonment	Raped and murdered women in Lexington, Kentucky, and additionally linked to other rapes	
Smith, Andrew Lavern	1980–1983	4	4	Executed 1998	Killed four people and attempted to kill a fifth along Interstate 85 in South Carolina	
Smith, Anthony Wayne	1999–2001	3	4	Sentenced to life imprisonment	Former defensive end who, with accomplices, killed at least three people during personal disputes	
Smith, Gayno	1961–1962	6	6	Died in prison	Killed six family members in Iowa	
Smith, Lemuel	1958–1981	5	6	Sentenced to death; commuted to life	First convict to kill an on-duty female corrections officer	
Smith, Mark Alan	1969–1970	4	12+	Sentenced to life imprisonment	Convicted of killing at least four women in Illinois and Arkansas; claimed in his book to have murdered eight women while stationed in Germany	
Smith, Michael Dewayne	2001–2002	3	3	Executed 2024	Killed three people in gang-related murders in Oklahoma	
Smith, William Scott	1981–1984	4	4+	Sentenced to life imprisonment	Kidnapped, raped and strangled women in Salem, Oregon	
Snyder, Leroy	1969	7	7	Died in prison	Active in Camden, New Jersey, in a period of eight months.	
Solomon Jr., Morris	1986–1987	6	7	Died in prison awaiting execution	Known as "The Sacramento Slayer"	
Soper, Edward Bates	1880–1897	5	5	Executed 1899	Killed his father, wife and two children in Missouri in separate incidents; fled to Oregon, where he killed another young child before his capture	
Sowell, Anthony	2007–2009	11	11	Died in prison awaiting execution	Known as "The Cleveland Strangler" and "The Imperial Avenue Murderer"	
Spangler, Robert	1978–1993	4	4	Died in prison	Murdered members of his own family in Colorado and Arizona	
Spencer, Timothy Wilson	1984–1988	5	5	Executed 1994	Known as "The Southside Strangler"; committed three rapes and murders in Richmond, Virginia, and one in Arlington County, Virginia, in the autumn of 1987. He is believed to have committed at least one previous murder, in 1984, for which a different man was wrongfully convicted.	
Spillman, Jack Owen	1994–1995	3	3	Sentenced to life imprisonment	Known as "The Werewolf Butcher"	
Spisak, Frank	1982	3	3	Executed 2011	Neo-Nazi who shot people during a racist and antisemitic shooting spree at Cleveland State University	
Spreitzer, Edward	1981–1982	18	18	Sentenced to death; commuted to life imprisonment	Member of the organized crime group known as "The Ripper Crew" or "The Chicago Rippers"	
Stafford, Roger Dale	1974–1978	9	34	Executed 1995	His wife implicated him in thirty-four different murders in seven different states	
Stano, Gerald	1969–1980	22	41+	Executed 1998	Murdered young women and girls in Florida, New Jersey and Pennsylvania	
Stayner, Cary	1999	4	4	Sentenced to death	Brother of kidnap victim Steven Stayner; murdered women in and around Yosemite National Park	
Steeves, Richard	1965–1985	6	6	Sentenced to life imprisonment	Murdered five people in three states from 1965 to 1966; was controversially released from prison in 1985 and later killed a sixth person	
Stephani, Paul Michael	1980–1982	3	3	Died in prison	Known as "The Weepy-Voiced Killer" due to a series of telephone calls he made to police, anonymously reporting his crimes in a remorseful and high-pitched voice; active in the Minneapolis–Saint Paul area	
Stevens, Charles	1989	4	4	Sentenced to death	Murdered four people from April to July 1989 on California Interstate-580	
Stickles, Martin	1899–1900	3	3	Executed 1901	Known as "The Kelso Killer"; murdered three people during robberies in Cowlitz County, Washington	
Stokes, Winford	1969–1978	3	3	Executed 1990	Career criminal and prison escapee who murdered people in St. Louis	
Strong, Preston	2005–2007	7	7	Sentenced to death	Killed a doctor and a family-of-six in Arizona	
Suff, William	1974–1992	14	14+	Sentenced to death	Known as "The Riverside Prostitute Killer"	
Sully, Anthony	1983	6	6	Died in prison awaiting execution	Ex-policeman who tortured and killed prostitutes and drug dealers at his Burlingame warehouse	
Sumner, Jesse	1963–1973	4	4	Died in prison	Murdered his robbery accomplice; paroled and murdered three young women in the vicinity of the Illinois State University	
Sumpter, Michael	1969–1973	3	3	Died in 2001	Raped and murdered women in the Boston area, including Jane Britton	
Surratt, Edward Arthur	1977–1978	7	18+	Sentenced to life imprisonment	Serial rapist and murderer operating mainly in western Pennsylvania and eastern Ohio, also known as "The Shotgun Killer". Although suspected in more than eighteen murders, Surratt was convicted of one murder in South Carolina. Surratt confessed to six additional murders in 2021.	
Sutton, Nicholas Todd	1979–1985	4	4	Executed 2020	Killed two friends and his grandmother during money and drug-related disputes; later stabbed to death a prison inmate	
Swango, Michael	1981–1997	4	60	Sentenced to life imprisonment	Physician and surgeon who poisoned patients and colleagues in the US and Zimbabwe	
Swann, James	1993	4	4	Found not guilty by reason of insanity and confined to Saint Elizabeths Hospital	Known as "The Shotgun Stalker"; responsible for random drive-by shotgun shootings in Washington, D.C.	
Syed, Muhammad	2022	3	4	Sentenced to 30 years to life	Killed three Muslim men in drive-by shootings from July to August 2022. He is also suspected in the fourth murder in November 2021, but has not been charged so far.	
Taborsky, Joseph "Mad Dog"	1950–1957	7	7	Executed 1960	Only convict in Connecticut to be sentenced to death twice for different crimes	
Tavares, Daniel	1988–2007	4	4	Sentenced to life imprisonment	Murdered a woman, his mother and later two others after release from prison	
Taylor, Alvin	1985–1987	4	4	Sentenced to involuntary commitment	Schizophrenic who murdered friends and acquaintances across Wisconsin during psychotic episodes.	
Taylor, Kevin	2001	4	4	Sentenced to life imprisonment	Preyed on sex workers in Southside Chicago	
Terry, Michael	1985–1986	6	6	Sentenced to life imprisonment	Murdered six men in Atlanta, Georgia, in a 10-month period	
Tersargyan, Alberd	2008–2010	4	4	Committed suicide in custody	Armenian immigrant who murdered a family of three and a prostitute in Hollywood, Los Angeles	
Tholmer, Brandon	1981–1983	12	34	Sentenced to life imprisonment	Known as "The West Side Rapist"; preyed on elderly women in Westside, Los Angeles County	
Thomas Jr., John Floyd	1972–1986	7	15+	Sentenced to life imprisonment	Known as "The Southland Strangler" and "The Westside Rapist"	
Thomas, Regis Deon	1992–1993	3	3	Sentenced to death	Gang member who killed three people, including two police officers, in Compton, Los Angeles	
Thompson, William Paul	1984	3	6	Executed 1989	Robbed and killed two men at a bar, then killed another man while on the run	
Thornburg, Jason Alan	2017–2021	3	5	Sentenced to death	Murdered and dismembered three people in Texas in September 2021; additionally confessed to killing his girlfriend and his roommate	
Toole, Ottis	1976–1983	6	6+	Died in prison	Accomplice of Henry Lee Lucas; claimed to have murdered Adam Walsh	
Toppan, Jane	1895–1901	12	31+	Died in Taunton State Hospital	Known as "Jolly Jane"; nurse who poisoned both patients and family members in Massachusetts	
Torrence, Michael	1987	3	3	Executed 1996	Robbed and killed two men with his brother and his wife; later killed a prostitute in Charleston during an argument	
Travis, Maury	2000–2002	12	20+	Committed suicide in custody	Suspected of kidnapping, torturing and killing women at his home in Ferguson, Missouri	
Trawick, Jack	1972–1992	5	14	Executed 2009	Executed for murdering a student in 1992. Confessed to killing five to 14 women in Alabama and other states, but only three victims were confirmed.	
Ture Jr., Joseph	1978–1980	6	6+	Sentenced to life imprisonment	Murdered a family of four and two other women in Minnesota	
Turner, Chester	1987–1998	15	16+	Sentenced to death	Convicted of murdering ten women and a viable unborn baby in South Los Angeles	
Turner, Douglas	1987–1991	9	9	Committed suicide prior to execution	Convicted of killing a family of three, then killed six inmates in prison	
Urdiales, Andrew	1986–1996	8	8	Committed suicide prior to execution	United States Marine who murdered women in Indiana, Illinois and California	
Valenti, Richard Raymond	1973–1974	3	3	Died in prison	Serial killer who killed three teenage girls between 1973 and 1974 in Folly Beach, South Carolina. Valenti was sentenced to life imprisonment for two of the murders, and he died in prison in 2020.	
Vann, Darren Deon	2013–2014	7	7+	Sentenced to life imprisonment	Indiana murderer who killed seven women; five of which were found in abandoned structures in the city of Gary	
Vaultz, Horace Van	1981–1986	3	3+	Sentenced to life imprisonment	Raped and murdered women across California; his home contained photographs of over twenty potential victims	
Van Dyke, David	1979–1980	6	6	Sentenced to life imprisonment	Murdered six people in their homes in Milwaukee, Wisconsin	
Vermilya, Louise	1893–1911	9	9	Died in 1913	Charges dismissed	
Victor, Clarence	1964–1987	3	3	Died in prison	Killed three people in Omaha, Nebraska, the latter two while on parole	
Villarreal, David	1979–1981	5	7	Sentenced to life imprisonment	Gay drifter who tortured and murdered acquaintances in San Antonio and Dallas	
Wade, Joshua	1994–2007	5	5+	Died in prison	Murdered people across Alaska during angry outbursts or robberies	
Wagner, Kenny	1925–1926	5	5	Died in prison	Murdered three police officers and two other men during prison escapes and as a fugitive	
Waldrop, Billy	1973–1982	3	3	Executed 1997	Killed an elderly man during a robbery after serving time in prison for two other murders	
Walker, Anthony Guy	1975–1986	6	6+	Sentenced to life imprisonment	Career criminal who murdered mainly across Lenawee County, Michigan	
Walker, Gary Alan	1984	5	5	Executed 2000	Known as the "Roaming Rapist"; murdered four women and one man in Oklahoma and Kentucky	
Walker, Tracy	1991–2021	4	4	Sentenced to life imprisonment	Killed a security guard during an argument; released and later killed fellow homeless people in Rancho Dominguez	
Wallace, Henry Louis	1990–1994	11	11	Sentenced to death	Known as "The Taco Bell Strangler"; preyed on women in and around Charlotte, North Carolina	
Walton, Edward	1896–1908	5	5	Executed 1908	Confessed to murdering five people across five states	
Walls, Frank Athen	1985–1987	5	5	Executed 2025	Confessed to murdering five people across Ocean City, Florida	
Ward, Ronald James	2000	4	4+	Died in prison	Murdered at least three women and one man in three states, in the span of four months	
Wardrip, Faryion	1984–1986	5	5	Sentenced to death	Serial rapist who assaulted and murdered women in Wichita Falls, Texas and the surrounding counties. Death sentence currently under appeal	
Warren, Edward Delon	1976–1979	3	3	Died in prison	Murdered a couple in Brookings, Oregon; later linked via DNA to an unsolved murder in Portland	
Warren, Lesley Eugene	1987–1990	4	8	Sentenced to death	Known as "The Babyface Killer"; raped and murdered women in New York and the Carolinas	
Washington, Steven	1963	3	3	Died in prison	Known as "The Window-Screen Rapist"; juvenile who raped and killed elderly women around St. Petersburg, Florida	
Watson, Alexander Wayne	1986–1994	4	4	Sentenced to life imprisonment	Raped, stabbed and strangled women in two Maryland counties	
Watts, Carl Eugene	1974–1982	14	100+	Died in prison	Known as "The Sunday Morning Slasher"; assaulted, tortured and murdered teenaged girls and young women in Michigan and Texas	
Webb, Emanuel Lovell	1990–1994	5	5+	Sentenced to 60 years in prison	Known as "The East End Killer"; raped and killed four women in Connecticut and a fifth woman in Georgia	
Weldon, Stewart	2017–2018	3	3	Sentenced to life imprisonment	Tortured and murdered women in Springfield, Massachusetts	
Wells, William	2003–2019	7	7	Sentenced to death	Murdered his wife and four other people in 2003. Also killed two prisoners, one in 2011 and another in 2019 respectively.	
Werner, Karl F.	1969–1971	3	3	Died in prison	Murdered teenage girls in Santa Clara County, California	
Wheeler-Weaver, Khalil	2016	3	4	Sentenced to 160 years in prison	Killed women he met through dating apps in Orange, New Jersey	
Whisenhant, Thomas	1963–1976	4	4+	Executed 2010	Kidnapped and murdered female clerks from convenience stores in Mobile County, Alabama	
White, Larry Lamont	1983	3	3	Sentenced to death	Shot and killed women in Louisville, Kentucky, during apparent robberies	
White, Nathaniel	1991–1992	6	6	Sentenced to 150 years to life	Confessed to bludgeoning and stabbing six women to death in Hudson Valley, New York, while on parole	
White, Robert	1980–2013	4	4	Sentenced to 50 years in prison	Sexually assaulted and beat three women to death in Hartford, Connecticut, while on parole for an earlier murder	
Whiteling, Sarah	1888	3	3	Executed 1889	Known as "The Wholesale Poisoner"	
Whitten, Hattie	1900–1902	3	3	Committed suicide in custody	Maine woman who poisoned her husband and two children	
Wickline, William	1979–1982	3	5+	Executed 2004	Known as "The Butcher"; drug addict who killed people in West Virginia and Ohio, dismembering and beheading their bodies post-mortem	
Wilder, Christopher	1984	8	8+	Killed by police	Known as "The Beauty Queen Killer"; Australian man who abducted and murdered women across the US	
Wiley, Nicholas	2004	3	7	Sentenced to life imprisonment	Known as "The Syracuse Serial Killer"; sex offender who confessed to killing seven people in Syracuse, New York	
Williams, Dorothy	1987–1989	3	3	Died in prison	Robbed and killed elderly people to support her heroin addiction	
Williams, Kenneth Dewayne	1998–1999	4	4	Executed 2017	Killed two people on the same day, then killed two more people after escaping from prison	
Williams, Laron	1977–1981	3	5+	Murdered in prison by fellow death row inmates	Strangled a prostitute in Nashville, Tennessee; later escaped from prison, murdering a police officer and priest; suspect in other murders across several states	
Williams, Leslie Allen	1991–1992	4	4	Sentenced to life imprisonment	Necrophile who killed and raped at least four women in Michigan while on parole for rape from 1991 to 1992.	
Williams, Ronald Turney	1975–1981	3	3	Sentenced to death	Criminal who murdered a police officer in 1975, another police officer while escaping from prison, and a final victim while he was a fugitive	
Williams, Scott	1997–2006	3	3	Died in prison	Killed women in Charlotte and Monroe, North Carolina	
Williamson, Thomas Andrew	1868–1890	4	4	Executed 1891	Murdered four people in Illinois and Missouri, including his wife	
Willie, Robert Lee	1978–1980	3	5	Executed 1984	Murdered at least three people in Louisiana	
Wimberly, Anthony	1984–1985	3	3	Sentenced to life imprisonment	Murdered three women in Oakland during a crime spree	
Wise, Martha	1924–1925	3	3	Died in prison	Poisoned seventeen members of her own family in Ohio	
Wood, Cathy	1987	5	5	Released in 2020	Accomplice of Gwendolyn Graham; nurse's aide that preyed on elderly women in a Walker, Michigan nursing home	
Wood, David Leonard	1987	6	9	Sentenced to death	Known as "The Desert Killer"; raped and murdered young girls and women in El Paso, Texas, burying their bodies in the desert afterwards	
Wood, Frederick Charles	1926–1960	5	5	Executed 1963	Violent habitual criminal who killed people in various New York cities, starting at age 14	
Woodbury, Michael	2007–2017	4	4	Sentenced to death	Convicted of a triple murder in New Hampshire in 2007. Later murdered a fellow inmate in 2017 while serving his life sentence in Florida while under a interstate compact order.	
Woodfield, Randall	1979–1981	18	44	Sentenced to life imprisonment	Known as "The I-5 Killer" and "The I-5 Bandit"; serial rapist, kidnapper, robber and burglar who preyed on women along the Interstate 5 corridor running through Washington, Oregon and California	
Woodward, Arthur T.	1923–1925	5	5	Died before apprehension	Perpetrator of the Osage Indian murders	
Wooten, Charles	1969–1993	3	3	Sentenced to life imprisonment	Killed two gas station attendants in Fort Worth during robberies; paroled, and later killed his father during an argument	
Wright, Douglas Franklin	1969–1991	7	7+	Executed 1996	First criminal executed by lethal injection in Oregon	
Wuornos, Aileen	1989–1990	7	7	Executed 2002	Known as the "Damsel of Death"; shot seven men to death in Florida between 1989 and 1990	
Yates, Robert Lee	1975–1998	16	16+	Sentenced to death; commuted to life imprisonment	Known as "The Grocery Bag Killer"; targeted women in and around Spokane, Washington	
Zarinsky, Robert	1965–1974	3	10	Died in prison	Murdered three teenage girls in Monmouth County, New Jersey; was also acquitted in the murder of a police officer	

== Unidentified serial killers ==
This is a list of unidentified serial killers who committed crimes within the United States.

Name	Years active	Proven victims	Possible victims	Region where active	Notes	Ref.
Alphabet murders	1971–1973	3	3	NY	Also known as the "Double Initial Murders"; murders of three young girls in the Rochester, New York area in the early 1970s	
Ann Arbor Hospital murders	1975	10	10	MI	Poisonings of ten patients at the Veteran's Administration Hospital in 1975. Two nurses, Filipina Narciso and Leonora Perez, were convicted but a new trial was ordered because of prosecutorial misconduct. The prosecution chose to drop the charges rather than retry.	
Atlanta child murders	1979–1981	28	30	GA	A series of murders committed in Atlanta, Georgia, between July 1979 and May 1981. Over the two-year period, at least twenty-eight children, adolescents, and adults were killed. Wayne Williams was charged and sentenced for the two adult murders, with twenty-four of the other murders attributed to him.	
Atlanta Lover's Lane Murders	1977	3	3	GA	A series of unsolved shootings of couples in Atlanta from January to March 1977	
Atlanta Ripper	1911	15	15–21	GA	Mystery murderer(s) of fifteen Atlanta women in 1911	
Axeman of New Orleans	1918–1919	6	6	LA	Responsible for the deaths of at least six people and the injuries of six to fourteen people in New Orleans and the surrounding areas from 1918 to 1919	
Bag murders	1975–1977	6	6	NY	Murders and dismemberment of gay men in Lower Manhattan, whose body parts were wrapped in garbage bags and thrown into the Hudson River; convicted murderer Paul Bateson was a prime suspect in the killings, but never charged	
Bigfoot Killer	1975	7	7	MI	Raped and murdered sex workers in Detroit; nicknamed derived from the suspect's large hands and feet	
Boca Raton murders	2007	3	3	FL	Three unsolved murders of women committed at the Town Center Mall in Boca Raton, Florida in 2007	
Boston Strangler	1962–1964	13	13	MA	1960s deaths of thirteen women (five young, eight older), mostly with their own stockings as ligature. Albert DeSalvo confessed to the murders, but was never indicted; DNA evidence tested in 2013 suggested his guilt in one of the cases	
Bouncing Ball Killer	1959–1960	6	7+	CA	Series of murders targeted towards elderly women in Los Angeles; convicted murderer Raymond Ward Clemmons confessed to the murders, but he was never charged due to a lie detector indicating he was being untruthful	
Bra murders	1967–1971	5	5	CT	Strangulations of five sex workers in Stamford, Connecticut; schizophrenic preacher Benjamin Franklin Miller was prosecuted for the crimes, but acquitted by reason of insanity, leaving his true guilt in question	
Castration serial murders	1980–1986	2	5+	WY, PA, UT, GA, CT	Series of murders of men who were shot in the back of the head and then castrated post-mortem	
Charlie Chop-off	1972–1974	4	4	NY	Murders of five boys in Manhattan in 1972 and 1973. A mental patient confessed to one slashing death. Four stabbings also involving mutilation remain unsolved	
Chicago Strangler	2001–2021	55	75+	IL	Raped and strangled predominantly African-American prostitutes and other vulnerable women in Chicago; could possibly be multiple serial killers	
Cincinnati Strangler	1965–1966	7	7	OH	Raped and strangled seven mostly elderly women in Cincinnati, Ohio, between 1965 and 1966; Cab driver Posteal Laskey Jr. is commonly believed to be culprit	
Cleveland Torso Murderer	1935–1938	12	20+	OH, possibly PA and CA	Also known as the "Mad Butcher of Kingsbury Run"; responsible for 12–13 murders in the Cleveland, Ohio area in the 1930s	
Colonial Parkway Killer	1986–1989	8	8	VA	Believed to have murdered at least eight people in Virginia between 1986 and 1989; left three couples dead and one couple missing and presumed dead. In January 2024, authorities announced that at least two of the murders had been conclusively linked to an official suspect, Alan W. Wilmer Sr., a local fisherman who died in 2017. Wilmer was also identified as a suspect in an unrelated third murder.	
Columbus murders	1965–1966	3	3	OH	Three fatal shootings committed in Columbus and West Jefferson	
Connecticut River Valley Killer	1978–1987	7	7+	MA, NH, VT	Stabbed at least six women to death in New England in the 1980s, severely injured one	
Cumminsville Killer	1904–1910	5	5	OH	Murdered and mutilated women in the Cincinnati neighborhood of South Cumminsville	
Dayton Strangler	1900–1909	6	6	OH	Murdered five women and one man in Dayton, Ohio, in the early 20th century; one man was wrongfully convicted for the murders	
Denver Prostitute Killer	1975–1995	17	27	CO	Abducted, raped and strangled young girls and women around Denver and its various suburbs	
Denver Strangler	1894–1903	3	5	CO	Strangled three prostitutes in Denver in ten weeks; also thought to be responsible in two more murders	
Doodler	1974–1975	6	16	CA	Sketched then stabbed to death gay men in San Francisco, California in the 1970s	
Dr. No	1981–1990	9	9+	OH, IL, NY, PA	Suspected of raping and strangling prostitutes alongside the Interstate 71; his first suspected victim is Marcia King, who was identified in 2018. Samuel Legg III, a trucker, has been arrested and charged but thus far (as of 2020) is incompetent to stand trial. He is receiving psychiatric treatment while they try to restore competency.	
Eastbound Strangler	2006	4	4	NJ	Murdered four women near Atlantic City, New Jersey, in 2006.	
Edgecombe County serial killer	2005–2009	10	11	NC	Murders of nine women and disappearance of another since 2005 around Rocky Mount, North Carolina. Antwan Pittman has been convicted in one case	
Essex County prostitute killings	1993–1998	14	15	NJ	Murders of at least fourteen women involved with prostitution in Essex County, New Jersey. Multiple perpetrators are suspected, and in 1998 Harrison Hogue was arrested for one of the murders but was ruled incompetent to stand trial.	
Flat-Tire murders	1975–1976	12	35	FL	Killed young girls and women in Broward and Miami-Dade Counties by offering help with fixing their car tires, before he sexually assaulted them and drowned them in canals	
Flint Serial Slasher	2009–2010	5	5	MI, OH, VA	Stabbing attacks against mostly small-framed African-American men, with the main area being Flint, Michigan; an Israeli national, Elias Abuelazam, has been convicted in one of the murders and remains the prime suspect in the other four	
Fort Myers Eight murders	Mid-1990s	8	8	FL	The remains of eight adult men discovered murdered in a wooded area in Fort Myers, Florida, on March 23, 2007. The men are believed to have been at the location since the mid-1990s. Convicted murderer and serial rapist Daniel Conahan has been named as the prime suspect	
Frankford Slasher	1985–1990	8	9	PA	Allegedly responsible for nine murders in the Frankford neighborhood of Philadelphia, Pennsylvania; Leonard Christopher was convicted of one murder; another murder was committed in same style while he was incarcerated; believed to still be at large	
Freeway Phantom	1971–1972	6	6	DC	Raped and strangled six young women and girls in Washington, D.C., in the early 1970s, dumping their bodies by freeways	
Gold Sock Killer	1973	3	3	FL	Strangled a woman and two teenage girls with socks in Broward County, Florida between July and August.	
Golden Years Murders	1990–1996	13	13+	VA	Murders of elderly women in Richmond, Virginia; murderer Leslie Burchart was convicted for some of the killings, but his guilt is disputed	
Great Basin Killer	1983–1997	4	4+	WY, UT, NV, ID	Allegedly responsible for the "Great Basin Murders", in which young girls and women were raped and killed across the Great Basin area; initially consisting of nine supposed murders, those have since been solved and attributed to different perpetrators	
Gulf Killer	1971–1979	16	16+	FL	A series of unsolved murders that occurred primarily in Pasco County, Florida in the 1970s; likely multiple killers	
Gypsy Hill killings	1976	5	5+	CA	Known as the "San Mateo slasher"; five unsolved killings, of young women in San Mateo County, California, during early 1976; in 2014, the FBI named Rodney Halbower as a person of interest in the Gypsy Hill killings; as of 2018, he has been convicted in two of the murders	
Hampton Roads Killer	1987–1996	12	12	VA	The perpetrator responsible for the murders of 12 men, most of whom were homosexual, in the Hampton Roads region of Virginia, and most victims were strangled; suspected to be Elton Manning Jackson, who was charged and convicted of one of the murders	
Hog Trail Murders	1993–1996	6	11	FL	Mutilated bodies of young men found in Charlotte County, Florida; thought to be linked to Daniel Conahan, who was charged and convicted of one of the murders	
Harbor City serial shootings	1993	3	3	CA	Shot four black men from his Jeep, three of them fatally	
Honolulu Strangler	1985–1986	5	5	HI	Raped and strangled five young women in Hawaii in 1985 and 1986	
I-45 Killer	1980	0	4+	TX	Strangled four known victims in 1980 and sexually assaulted some. Two of the four women have never been identified.	
I-70 killer	1992–2001	6	9+	IN, MO, KS; TX (suspected)	Killed and robbed six store clerks around the Midwestern United States	
I-70 Strangler	1980–1991	12	12+	IN, OH	Killed gay men and dumped their bodies near I-70; suspected serial killer Herb Baumeister is considered the prime suspect in the case	
Jeff Davis 8	2005–2009	8	8	LA	The bodies of eight women were found in swamps and canals surrounding Jennings, Louisiana. Originally thought to be a serial killer, but multiple suspects may be involved	
Little Rock serial stabbings	2020–2021	3	3	AR	Random stabbing murders against strangers that occurred in Little Rock, Arkansas	
Lone Woman Murders	1943–1949	9	12+	CA	Over nine unsolved femicides committed in Los Angeles that involved sexual mutilation, including the famous Black Dahlia murder	
Main South Woodsman	2002–2004	3	5	MA	Murdered prostitutes picked up from Worcester's Main South neighborhood, dumping the bodies in various towns across the state and neighboring Maine. Convicted murderer Alex Scesny is considered the prime suspect, but has never been charged.	
The Man from the Train	1890–1912	0	59+	USA	Killed whole families in their sleep, from the East Coast to the West, arriving and departing by train. Existence (probable but identity unproven) was discovered over 100 years after the murders by analysis of contemporary records, showing a markedly common modus operandi for many previously unconnected crimes.	
Miami Strangler	1964–1970	9	11	FL	Murdered at least nine women in Miami, Florida, between 1964 and 1970	
Michigan Murders	1967–1969	1	7	MI	Raped, stabbed, and strangled young women between the ages of 13 and 21 in the Washtenaw County area of Michigan. John Norman Collins was convicted of the last murder in the series and strongly suspected to be responsible for all seven murders attributed to the same perpetrator.	
Missouri River Killer	1982–1994	7	7+	MO	Abducted and killed women and young girls in Kansas City, Missouri, and surrounding areas. The killer was noted for amputating his victims' legs before dumping their remains in the Missouri River. Gregory Breeden, a then-Kansas City resident, remains the prime suspect in the case due to his relations with several of the victims, but he vehemently denied being the killer.	
Mulatto Axe Murders	1911–1912	35	49+	LA, TX	Axe murders of a minimum of twelve African-American and interracial families along the Southern Pacific railroad line running through Louisiana and Texas. Raymond Barnabet was tried and convicted of the murders of one family. His teenage daughter, Clementine Barnabet was arrested shortly afterwards following the murder of another family and confessed to the murders of thirty-five others. She was later convicted of one murder, but released from prison in 1923. Both convictions have been disputed by historians. No one has ever been charged with the other slayings	
Nassau County serial murders	1984–1989	5	5	NY	Murders of five prostitutes committed in the Nassau County area; Allen Gormely, convicted of murdering two prostitutes in Long Beach in 1990, is considered the current prime suspect	
New Bedford Highway Killer	1988–1989	9	11	MA	Murders of nine women and disappearance of two others between 1988 and 1989	
Oakland County Child Killer	1976–1977	4	4+	MI	Also known as the "Babysitter"; responsible for the murders of four or more children in Oakland County, Michigan in 1976 and 1977	
Oklahoma City Butcher	1976–1986	3	3	OK	Killed and mutilated three women in Oklahoma City between 1976 and 1986	
Phantom Killer	1946	5	5	TX	Believed to have committed the Texarkana Moonlight Murders in Texas between February 23 and May 4, 1946	
Pittsburg serial murders	1998–1999	5	5	CA	Single or multiple offenders who murdered one man and four women over three months in the city of Pittsburg, California	
1996 Raleigh murders	1996	6	6	NC	Series of murders and rapes across the Raleigh, North Carolina area; multiple killers are suspected, including one who was convicted of two murders	
Redhead murders	1978–1992	5	14+	TN, AR, KY, MS, PA, WV	Series of unsolved homicides believed to have been committed by an unidentified serial killer in Tennessee, Arkansas, Kentucky, Mississippi, Pennsylvania and West Virginia, also known as "The Bible Belt Strangler"	
Sacramento Mad Killer	1940–1941	5	6+	CA	Unidentified serial killer who murdered middle-aged men picked up from bars in the Sacramento area	
San Diego serial murders	1985–1990	43	43+	CA	Murders of women, predominantly prostitutes and drug addicts, across San Diego County. Initially believed to be a single serial killer, but later determined to be multiple killers.	
Santa Rosa hitchhiker murders	1972–1973	7	7+	CA	A series of at least seven unsolved homicides involving female hitchhikers that took place in Sonoma County and Santa Rosa of the North Bay area of California in 1972 and 1973	
Servant Girl Annihilator	1884–1885	8	8	TX	Also known as the "Austin Axe Murderer"; responsible for at least seven murders and severe injuries to seven others in Austin, Texas between 1884 and 1885	
Skid Row Stabber	1978–1979	11	11	CA	Murdered homeless men in Los Angeles' Skid Row neighborhood; Bobby Joe Maxwell was falsely convicted of two of the murders and accused of the rest, and died while in a coma prior to being exonerated	
South Florida serial murders	1997–2001	3	10+	FL	Murdered women, most of whom were homeless or prostitutes, primarily by strangling, four of the ten murders have been solved	
South Memphis prostitute killings	2011	3	4	TN	Murders of three sex workers in Memphis, Tennessee, in the winter of 2011; possibly linked to a fourth murder committed in 2015	
Storyville Slayer	1991–1996	24	24+	LA	Abducted, strangled and drowned predominantly female prostitutes around New Orleans; thought to be multiple killers	
Stockton serial shootings	2021–2022	7	7	CA	Shot one man to death in Oakland and five in Stockton and shot a woman in Stockton who survived her injuries. Wesley Brownlee was arrested for the murders on October 15, 2022.	
Suitland murders	1986–1987	5	9	MD, DC	Abducted, raped and stabbed to death women around Suitland, Maryland; convicted murderer Alton Alonso Best is considered the prime suspect	
Texas Killing Fields	1970s–2000s	4	30+	TX	Since the early 1970s, roughly thirty bodies have been extracted from the fields, mainly consisting of young girls. As of March 2024, six of the cases have been definitively solved, and authorities now believe that multiple offenders are involved.	
Tube Sock Killings	1985	4	6	WA	Unsolved murders which occurred in the remote community of Mineral in Washington	
Ventura Strangler	1977	3	3+	CA	Targeted sex workers in Ventura County, California, over several months in 1977; a suspect, Warren Alexander, was arrested in 2024	
Waverly stranglings	1971–1976	3	3	IA	A teenage girl and two young women were abducted and strangled in and around Waverly; due to the similarities between the cases, it is speculated that this was the work of a possible serial killer.	
West Mesa murders	2003–2009	11	11+	NM	Remains of eleven women, who disappeared between 2003 and 2005, found buried in the desert in Albuquerque, New Mexico, in 2009 and attributed to a bone collector.	
Zodiac Killer	1968–1974	5	37	CA; NV (possible)	Targeted young couples. Remains unsolved but open in the California jurisdictions the five certain Zodiac murders occurred. Potentially thirty-seven total victims claimed but unverified.	

== See also ==
- List of rampage killers in the United States
- List of mass shootings in the United States

International:

- Lists of serial killers

== Bibliography ==
- Burkhalter Chmelir, Sandra (2003). "Serial Killers". In Robert Kastenbaum (ed.). Macmillan Encyclopedia of Death and Dying. Vol. 2. New York: Macmillan Reference USA/Thomson/Gale. p. 1. Archived from the original on May 3, 2009.
- Morton, RJ (2005). "Serial murder multi-disciplinary perspectives for investigators" (PDF). Federal Bureau of Investigation.
- Grann, David (2017). Killers of the Flower Moon: The Osage Murders and the Birth of the FBI. New York: Knopf Doubleday Publishing Group. ISBN 9780385534253.
- Hollandsworth, Skip (2015). The Midnight Assassin. New York: Henry Holt. p. 81. ISBN 978-0-8050-9767-2.
- Lane, Brian; Gregg, Wilfred (1995) [1992]. The Encyclopedia Of Serial Killers. New York City: Berkley Book. ISBN 0-425-15213-8.
