= Diane O'Dell =

American female serial killer (born 1953)

- Born: 1953 (age 72–73); Orwell Township, Pennsylvania, United States
- Status: Incarcerated
- Motive: Children were illegitimate Fathers of children abandoned her
- Conviction: Second-degree murder
- Penalty: Life imprisonment

Details
- Victims: 3–4
- Date: 1982/1983/1985
- Country: United States
- Locations: Sullivan County, New York
- Weapon: Asphyxiation
- Date apprehended: May 17, 2003; 23 years ago

Diane O'Dell (born 1953) is an American serial killer who was convicted of murdering three of her 12 children. She was also investigated for the disappearance of another one of her children. O'Dell regularly traveled with the corpses. The bodies of the three dead newborns were found in May 2003 in a storage shed O'Dell rented and abandoned in Safford, Arizona.

By all accounts, she murdered them because they were illegitimate. O'Dell told police the babies died at birth between 1981 and 1984. She kept the three babies in a storage unit for over ten years. When she defaulted on her rent, her landlord cleared out her possessions and discovered the corpses. The case became known as 'The Babies in Boxes Murder Case'.

== Trial ==
In her 2003 trial, the jury rejected three counts of first degree murder, but unanimously found her guilty of second degree murder.

In 2004, she was sentenced to life in prison. She will be eligible for parole in 2029.

== See also ==
- List of serial killers in the United States
