= Samuel Cooper (serial killer) =

American serial killer

- Born: Samuel James Cooper Jr. January 12, 1977 (age 49); North Carolina, U.S.
- Status: Incarcerated
- Convictions: First degree murder (5 counts); Armed robbery
- Penalty: 5 life terms without the possibility of parole

Details
- Victims: 5
- Span of crimes: 2006–2007
- Country: United States
- State: North Carolina
- Weapons: 9mm Ruger P89DC; 40 S&W Ruger P94
- Imprisoned at: Warren Correctional Institution, NC

Samuel James Cooper Jr. (born January 12, 1977) is an American serial killer who murdered five men in North Carolina between 2006 and 2007. Convicted of five counts of first-degree murder, Cooper was spared a death sentence and sentenced to life in prison without parole.

== Early life ==
One of four children born to Samuel Cooper Sr. and his wife Jacqueline, Cooper grew up in an abusive home. His father regularly beat his wife and children with a baseball bat, broomstick, leather belt, or his fists. Cooper, whom his mother knew as "Little Sammy", always got the worst abuse, which started by the time he was 3 months old; his mother recalled an incident where her husband shook and threw him because he was crying and then punched her in the face. One of Cooper's sisters described their father as "the devil" and even considered suicide due to the abuse. The children even once plotted to kill their father, but never acted on it.

By the time he was 13 years old, Cooper stopped crying during the beatings, and, according to a psychiatrist at his murder trial, stopped "feeling fear or fearing pain."

== Adult years ==
Cooper committed numerous crimes as an adult, including several armed robberies in 1994. In 1999, while serving time for the robberies, Cooper and two other inmates escaped by attacking and overpowering their supervisor, then taking control of his vehicle. When he was in court to be sentenced for the escape several months later, Cooper attacked a deputy in court and unsuccessfully tried to take her sidearm. He was released from prison for these crimes in February 2006.

== Murders, trial, and conviction ==
On May 12, 2006, Samuel shot and killed Ossama Haj-Hussein, 43. On June 3, 2006, he shot and killed LeRoy Jernigan, 41. On April 27, 2007, he shot and killed Timothy Barnwell, 34. On October 12, 2007, he shot and killed Ricky High, 48. On October 14, 2007, he shot and killed Tariq Hussain, 52. He killed some of his victims during armed robberies.

Police arrested Cooper in November 2007 following a local bank robbery. Cooper was linked to the murders from a handgun he had dropped while fleeing the bank robbery. He eventually confessed to the murders.

Cooper was charged, tried, and found guilty of five counts of first degree murder. Cooper's defense team sought a life sentence, arguing that his childhood abuse had affected his mental state. Prosecutors sought a death sentence, pointing to his history of violence, saying that even if Cooper did suffer from mental disorders, they did not have any effect on his willingness to kill. The jury ultimately spared Cooper's life, and he was instead sentenced to five life terms without parole, one for each murder. He is serving his sentence at Warren Correctional Institution.

== See also ==
- List of serial killers in the United States
