= Nathaniel Harvey =

American serial killer (1950–2020)

- NJDOC mugshot c. 2010
- Born: March 21, 1950; Camden, New Jersey, U.S.
- Died: November 27, 2020 (aged 70); South Woods State Prison, Bridgeton, New Jersey, U.S.
- Convictions: Murder; Rape; Assault with intent to rape Assault and battery Lewdness
- Penalty: Death; commuted to life imprisonment

Details
- Victims: 2
- Span of crimes: 1978–1985
- Country: United States
- State: New Jersey
- Date apprehended: October 28, 1985

Nathaniel Harvey (March 21, 1950 – November 27, 2020) was an American murderer who was sentenced to death in New Jersey for the 1985 rape-murder of a woman in Plainsboro. He was one of only eight men on New Jersey's death row when it was abolished in 2007 by then-Governor Jon Corzine. His death sentence was commuted to life in prison, and he died at South Woods State Prison in 2020. A few years after his death, he was linked through DNA evidence to a separate rape-murder committed in East Windsor in 1984.

== Crimes ==
=== 1978 Middlesex County rape ===
On October 16, 1978, Harvey was driving through Monroe Township in Middlesex County when he began tailing a car being driven by a 24-year-old woman. He followed her home and pulled into her driveway, then approached her questioning her family's occupations. When she went inside, presumably to get information for Harvey, he followed close behind and attacked her. He raped and beat her before the victim managed to escape through a rear window and ran to a neighbor's home for help. Coincidently, the woman had been raped just months prior by 45-year-old Herman Schmidt, who had no known connection to Harvey.

Harvey turned himself in on October 20 after the victim identified him from a series of photographs. He was charged with rape, assault with intent to rape, atrocious assault, battery, burglary and lewdness. He was convicted of four of these charges in March 1979 and was sentenced to 15–20 years in prison. He was imprisoned at New Jersey State Prison until a New Jersey Parole Board granted him parole in early 1983.

=== Murder of Donna Macho ===
Donna Macho, a 19-year-old Hightstown High School graduate, disappeared from her parents' home in East Windsor on February 26, 1984. At the time, she was employed as a legal secretary with aspirations to make a career in modeling. On the night of February 25, the day prior to her disappearance, she was home alone with her 14-year-old sister Julie, and the two had spent several hours watching horror movies before Julie went to bed. The next morning, Julie awoke to find Donna missing. Her car was discovered several miles away with blood stains on the passenger seat, leading investigators to believe she had been murdered. Police suspected her kidnapper carried her out of the house and forced her to drive to a secluded location. Detectives also discovered evidence of a sexual assault as semen was found in Macho's bedroom. A reward of $2,000 was put up by her parents for information.

On April 2, 1995, a boy scout troop discovered skeletal remains in a wooded area in Cranbury. Along with the remains, pieces of clothing and jewelry were discovered in the immediate area. Through dental records, the remains were identified as belonging to Macho, over eleven years after she went missing.

=== Murder of Irene Schnaps ===
On June 17, 1985, the body of 37-year-old Irene Schnaps was discovered inside her Princeton Meadows apartment in Plainsboro Township. The discovery was made by a coworker who went to Schnaps' apartment after she failed to show up to her job at an RCA plant. The initial investigation into her death revealed that she had been sexually assaulted and beaten to death with a blunt object. A bloody sneaker print left by her killer was discovered at the crime scene.

On October 28, Harvey was arrested for attempting to kidnap a 13-year-old girl in West Windsor earlier that same month. In a search of his vehicle, police discovered a watch that matched the description of a watch that had been stolen from Schnaps' apartment. Subsequently, a sneaker print that was collected from his vehicle was matched to the one found in Schnaps' apartment. Afterwards, Harvey was charged with her murder and pleaded not guilty.

== Convictions, death sentence and appeals ==
Harvey went to trial on September 30, 1986. On the first day, assistant prosecutor Thomas J. Kapsak claimed that, upon his arrest, Harvey confessed to killing Schnaps before later recanting. Harvey's defense denied this and proclaimed their client was innocent. The alleged confession was key as to why the jury found Harvey guilty on all counts on October 10, and seven days later imposed a verdict of death. After his death sentence, Harvey attempted to get a new trial on the basis that his alleged confession should not have been used at trial. In 1991, the United States Supreme Court ruled that Harvey's confession should not have been used as evidence and he was granted a new trial.

Harvey's second trial spanned from October to December 1994, and he was again convicted and sentenced to death. In 2007, New Jersey Governor Jon Corzine, a death penalty opponent, signed legislation that officially eliminated capital punishment in the state; because of this, Harvey and the other seven New Jersey death row inmates were resentenced to life in prison. In 2015, Harvey appealed his conviction and again was granted a new trial. In 2017, an appeals court upheld the decision granting Harvey a third trial.

== Death and aftermath ==
On November 27, 2020, Harvey died at South Woods State Prison while awaiting his third trial.

In April 2023, investigators announced they had linked Harvey to Macho's murder based on his DNA matching the semen found in her bed.
