= North Camden =

Populated place in Camden County, New Jersey, US

Coordinates: 39.95712°N 75.09189°W

- Neighborhood of Camden
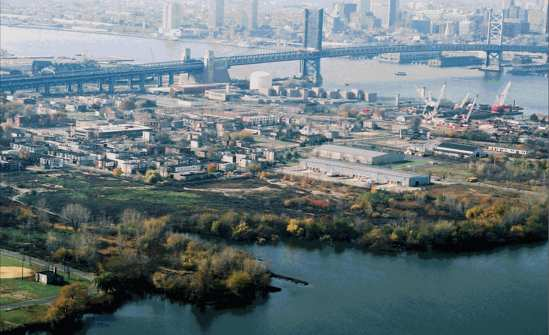
- Aerial view of North Camden
- Interactive map of North Camden
- Country: United States
- State: New Jersey
- County: Camden
- City: Camden
- Area code: 856

North Camden is a district of Camden, New Jersey. The population is 7,874. Cooper Point and Pyne Point are located in the area.

== Early history ==
The neighborhood of North Camden was made part of the city of Camden in 1852. Originally composed of the lands north of Birch street and Linden street. Historically the purchased territory of William Cooper who built his home on what is now Coopers Point. He then built his estate on Pyne Point Park. There are only a few remaining structures still standing in North Camden that belonged to the original Cooper Family such as the Joseph Cooper House and Benjamin Cooper House. The Joseph Cooper House is an old manor on Pyne Point built in 1695 by Joseph Cooper son of William Cooper. The Benjamin Coopers House is a farm house on Point and Erie Street built in 1734 also known as the Old Stone Jug. Nearby there was The Coopers Point Hotel on State Street built in 1770 by Samuel Cooper. The hotel would later be purchased by the Camden and Atlantic Railroad and be used as an office building eventually to be torn down in 1896.

== Demographics ==
The area of North Camden is approximately 0.613 square miles. North Camden has a population of 8,159 people between the 2 neighborhoods of Cooper Point and Pyne Point. The population density according to the 2016 Census is 13,303 residents per square mile.

=== Housing information ===
The 2016 Census reports that the Median household income is $20,667 which is lower than the Camden average of $26,783. This low income is showcased throughout the neighborhood with multiple abandoned houses in the neighborhood. As of 2016 median rent for a North Camden resident is $542 which is lower than the Camden median rent of $713. As of 2016 the average value of a detached house is $280,000 is higher than the Camden city average of $128,521. The estimated cost of a town house in North Camden in 2016 is $71,000.

==== Racial distribution ====
According to the 2016 Census data North Camden is a predominantly Hispanic community. The community is 68% Hispanic, which is approximately 4,552 of 6,692 people. The African American community is 26% of the community with 1,740 of 6,692 people. The rest of the community is made up of 5% white and 1% Asian.

== Education ==
=== Cooper's Poynt School ===
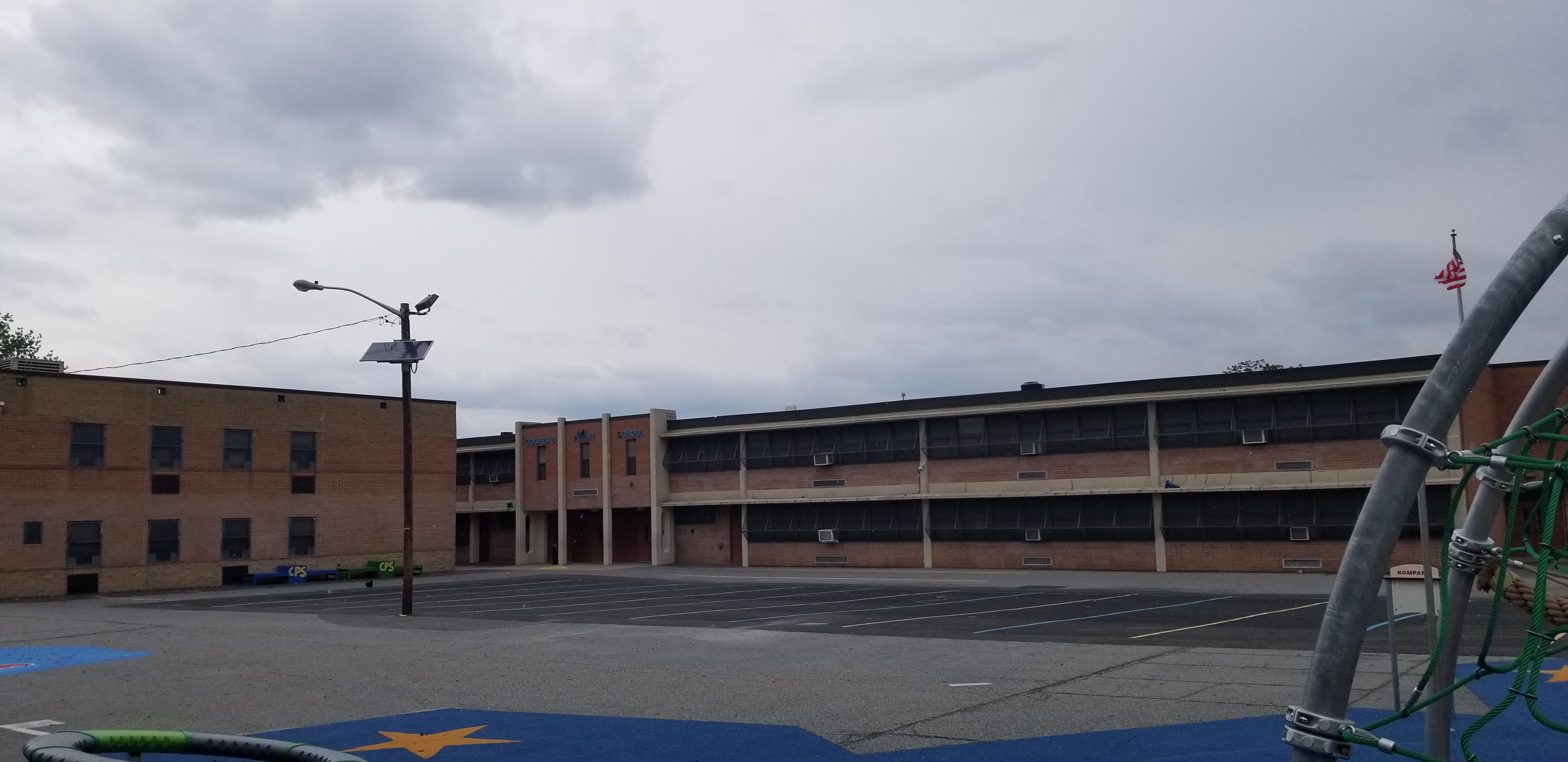
Cooper's Poynt School Building and school yard

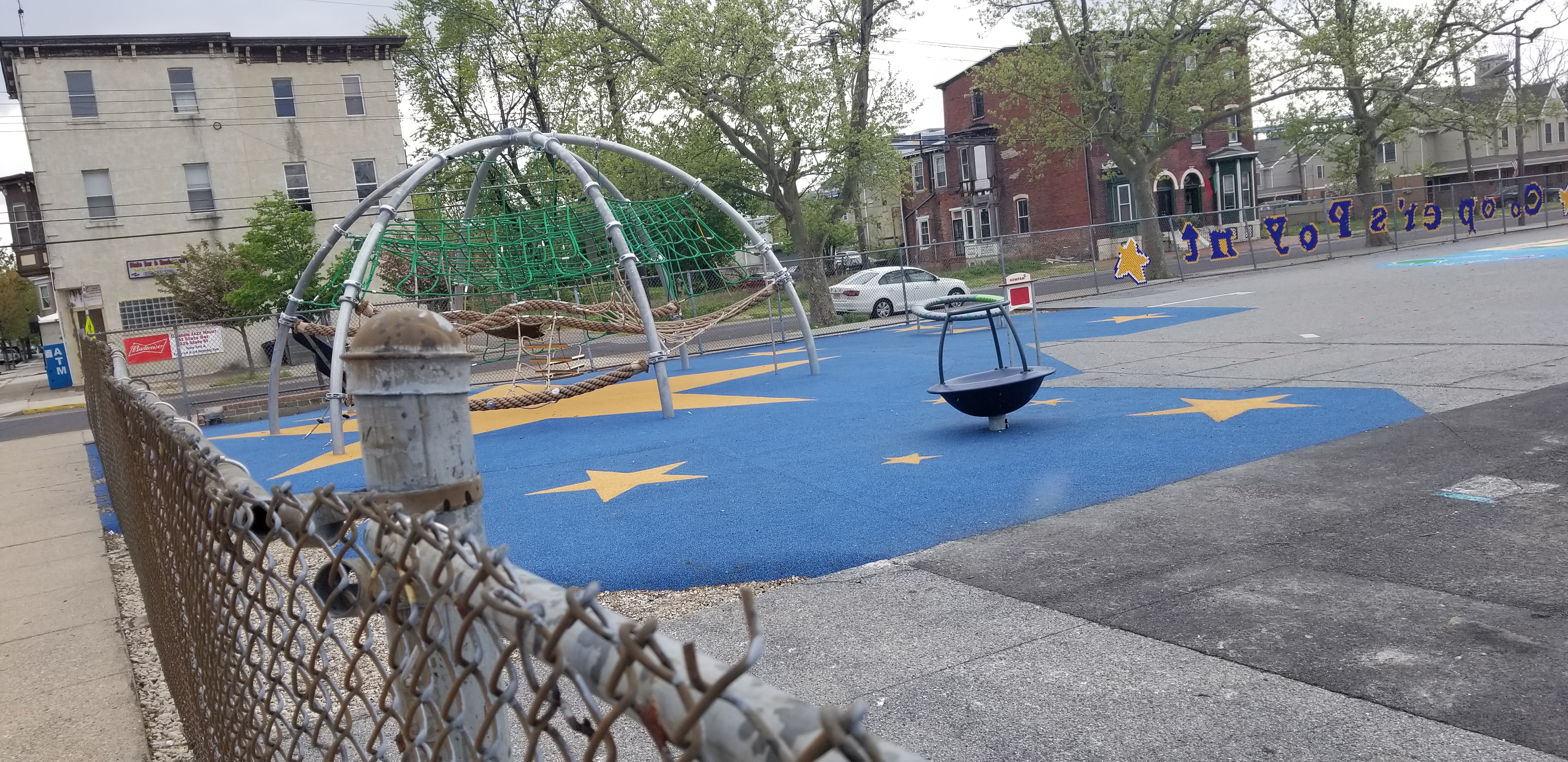
Cooper's Poynt built the students a Jungle gym to have fun safely

Cooper's Poynt middle school is a K-8 school. On February 18, 2005, the School board of Camden made a decision to make their schools K-8. Coopers Poynt was built in 1967. In 2003, a 3rd grade student by the name of Lorenzo "Alexander" Gibson who attended Cooper's Point was on the path to become the youngest Chess master in history. He was a part of a small chess club and adapted the game fast.

=== Mastery High School of Camden – Molina Campus ===
Formerly known as Rafael Cordero Molina School. The school is named after Puerto Rican educator Rafael Cordero who advocated for free schooling for all children regardless of social standing or race. He is also known as "Father of Public Education in Puerto Rico". On March 27, 1993 Rutgers University- Camden Campus adopted Rafael Cordero Molina School. This gave the elementary school access to many of the universities resources that the school does not have. Swimming pools and art galleries were some of the things students were excited for. The relationship started when graduate students started helping the students of Molina with homework and saw an increase in student grades. The school is now a charter elementary school split into two schools. Molina Upper Elementary and Molina Upper Elementary.

=== Mastery High School ===
Formerly known as Pyne Point Middle school was a K-8 school. The school was built in 1960. After the school lab burned down in 1987 the school was gifted a new lab by AT&T/Bell Laboratories in 1988. The fire caused about $200,000 in damage so the school district could only replace the books because the lab equipment was too expensive. Mr. Walker one of the sciences teachers said that he was excited about the new equipment and could go back to teaching hands-on science. The school was adopted by Mastery school's in 2001.

== See also ==
- Joseph Cooper House
