= A. C. Wagner =

A. C. Wagner may refer to:

- Adam C. Wagner, German-American architect who designed breweries including the American Brewing Company Plant
- Albert C. Wagner (1911–1987), director of New Jersey's Department of Corrections
- Albert C. Wagner Youth Correctional Facility in Chesterfield, New Jersey
