= Ricardo Cepates =

Serial rapist, 2001 to 2003

- Cepates's NJDOC Mugshot
- Born: April 26, 1971 (age 55); Honduras
- Occupation: Construction worker
- Penalty: Probation (1998); 139 years in prison (2005)

Details
- Victims: 7 (5 raped, 2 attempted)
- Span of crimes: September 20, 2001 – December 6, 2003
- State: New Jersey
- Date apprehended: December 6, 2003
- Imprisoned at: New Jersey State Prison

Ricardo Cepates (born April 26, 1971) is a Honduran convicted serial rapist and kidnapper who assaulted seven women in the city of New Brunswick, New Jersey, from 2001 to 2003. His modus operandi was to attack his victims during the late afternoon or early morning in the vicinity of Rutgers University, where some of his victims were attending as students. Cepates was captured the day of his last attack after being accosted and beaten by an angry group of residents.

His crimes caused controversy over illegal immigration. Cepates had been arrested for attempting to assault a woman three years before the serial rapes began, but after being arrested, authorities made no progress to deport him to his native Honduras.

== Crimes ==
=== Events ===
1. September 20, 2001: at approximately 7:30 p.m., a 21-year-old woman was attacked by a man with a broken bottle between Hamilton and Woodbridge streets. She was beaten, dragged into the nearby woods and sexually assaulted.
2. October 13, 2001: at approximately 3:00 a.m., a 25-year-old woman was sexually assaulted and stabbed in her apartment on French Street.
3. February 23, 2002: at approximately 5:00 a.m., a 46-year-old woman and her 14-year-old daughter were attacked at knifepoint in a field off Jersey Avenue near Baldwin Street. They were both raped.
4. August 16, 2002: at approximately 10:30 p.m., an 18-year-old woman was beaten, thrown to the ground and dragged off a sidewalk between Somerset and Albany streets. She was threatened with a knife and robbed.
5. June 28, 2003: at approximately 5:30 a.m., a woman was attacked at knife point between French and Louis streets. She was dragged into an alleyway and sexually assaulted.
6. December 6, 2003: a failed rape occurred when a man accosted a young woman in a convenience store. She fought back and the man fled.

=== Investigation ===
Police sketch of Cepates c. 2003 (Middlesex County Sheriff's Office)

In early June 2003, New Brunswick investigators started to investigate the rapes as possibility being connected to a serial rapist. By late June, they confirmed this suspicion by finding the same male DNA at multiple crime scenes. At the same time, the rapist was ruled out in several unsolved rapes in occurred in the surrounding area.

On December 6, after the last attack, a bystander chased the assailant through a more than a foot of snow across French Street. Two other men joined him and attacked the assailant, beating him until police arrived. When they arrested the man, he was identified as Cepates, then 32 years old. He was working as a construction worker at the time and possibly as a day laborer. He was married and had one child. He did not immediately admit involvement. Later, DNA tests linked him to six other rapes. He pleaded not guilty to all charges and was held at the Middlesex County Adult Correction Center on $1,625,000 bail.

=== Legal proceedings ===
In April 2004, a grand jury formally indicted Cepates on several counts of aggravated sexual assault, kidnapping, making terroristic threats, weapons possession, aggravated assault, burglary and child endangerment. Later in the year, Cepates was convicted on all counts. In February 2005, he was sentenced to 139 years in prison. In sentencing, judge Frederick DeVesa said that Cepates, "terrorized an entire community for two years and the Rutgers University campus". By the time of his sentencing, Cepates had confessed to all of the crimes and apologized to the victims in court. In 2014, the New Jersey Supreme Court denied Cepates a new hearing.

Cepates is currently imprisoned at New Jersey State Prison.

== Controversy ==
Cepates' crimes attracted controversy among New Brunswick residents when it was found out that before he committed the rapes, he had been arrested for attempting to assault another woman. In 1998, he was arrested for grabbing a woman and holding a knife to her throat as she walked down Livingston Avenue. He was charged with criminal restraint and possession of a weapon for unlawful purposes. He pleaded guilty to the charges and received probation. He was not a registered U.S. citizen at the time, and New Jersey authorities made no effort to have him deported to his native country, something that became controversial after his 2003 arrest.
