= Jerome Dennis =

Jerome Dennis may refer to:

- Jerome Dennis (Canadian football)
- Jerome Dennis (serial killer)
