= Cooper Point, Camden =

Populated place in Camden County, New Jersey, US

Coordinates: 39.95613°N 75.12537°W

Cooper Point
- Neighborhood of Camden
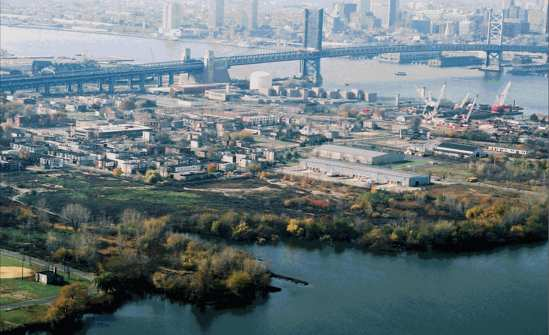
- Former Riverside Prison (demolished) and Weeks Marine facilities seen beyond the Benjamin Franklin Bridge
- Interactive map of Cooper Point
- Country: United States
- State: New Jersey
- County: Camden
- City: Camden
- Area code: 856

Cooper Point (also known as Cooper Poynt) is a neighborhood in the northwestern part of Camden, New Jersey, United States. According to the 2000 U.S. census, the neighborhood has a population of 2,880. It is north of Cooper Grant and the Central Waterfront the other neighborhoods located near the Benjamin Franklin Bridge.

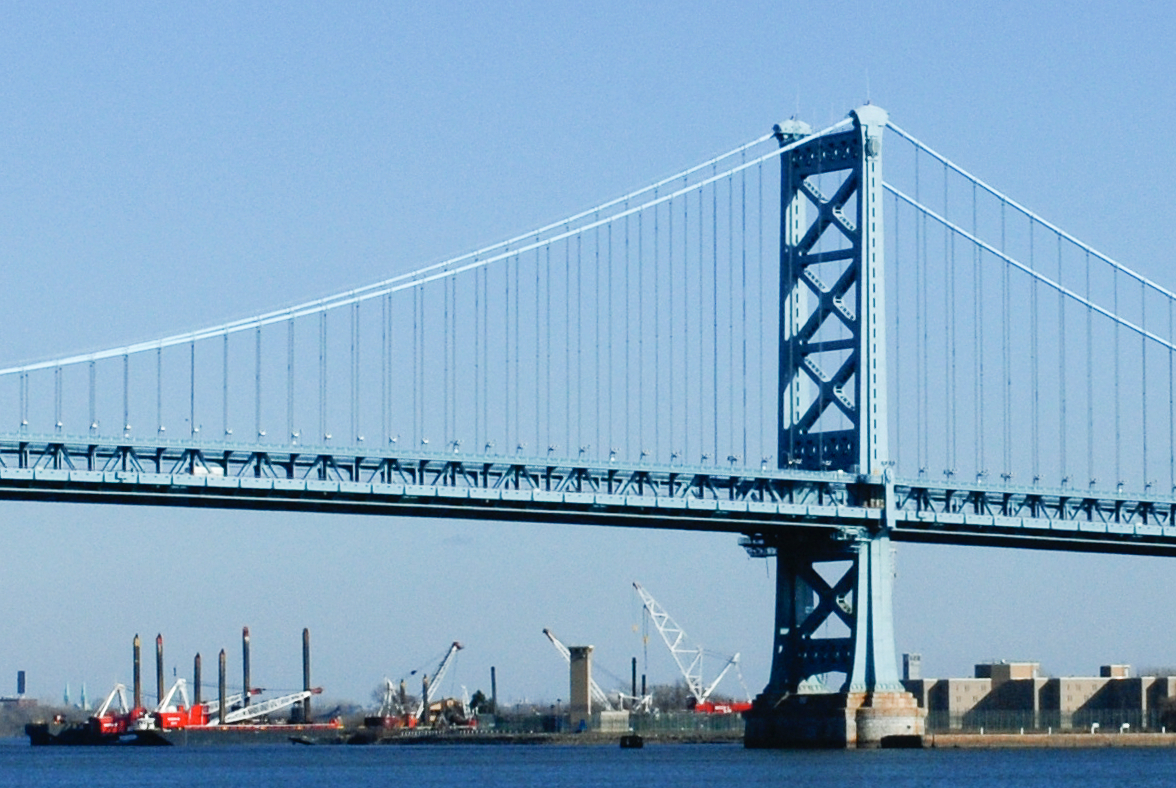
Looking northeast to waterfront of Cooper Point with Weeks Marine

The yards of Weeks Marine and the site of the former Riverfront State Prison are located along the Delaware River. In May 2013, the New Jersey Economic Development Authority announced that it would seek developers for the site. In September 2013, Waterfront Renaissance Associates announced that it proposed to build the Riverfront World Trade Center, a development of 2.3-million-square-foot campus on 16 acres on the site. The project would be built in four phases, the first of which would be a promenade along the Delaware River.

== See also ==
- Benjamin Cooper House
- Joseph Cooper House
- Penn-Jersey Shipbuilding Corp.
- John H. Mathis & Company
- United States lightship Barnegat (LV-79)
