= Brian Aitken =

American marketing consultant, entrepreneur, & writer

Brian Aitken is an American marketing consultant, entrepreneur, and writer.

In 2009, Aitken became a cause célèbre among gun-rights activists in the United States, after he was convicted and sentenced to seven years in prison for possessing handguns legally purchased in Colorado and transported in New Jersey from one residence to another. Aitken spent four months in prison before New Jersey Governor Chris Christie commuted Aitken's sentence to time served. In 2012, the New Jersey Superior Court, Appellate Division and the State of New Jersey dismissed three illegal possession of firearms convictions and in 2018 Aitken was pardoned by Governor Christie.

== Background ==
Aitken was born in Pennsylvania and moved to Colorado, where he married a fellow New Jersey émigré and became a legal resident. After his divorce, he returned to New Jersey, where he had attended college to be near his young son and other family members. During the course of his move back to New Jersey, he made several trips by commercial airline to and from Colorado. Prior to the last trip, he reviewed guidance from the United States Department of Homeland Security Transportation Security Administration to ensure he could legally transport three handguns in his checked luggage.

== Arrest ==
In January 2009, Aitken's mother dialed 911 while Aitken was packing his car to move to Hoboken. His mother, "a social worker trained to be sensitive to suicidal indicators" hung-up the phone before the call was answered. Afterwards police came to the house. The responding officers searched Aitken's car and discovered three locked and unloaded handguns in the trunk. Aitken was subsequently arrested for possession of these weapons and was sentenced to seven years in prison by Judge James Morley. Judge Morley's decision not to provide information to the jury regarding exceptions to New Jersey's relatively strict firearm possession laws became a source of controversy. Gun laws in the United States vary widely by state and require expert knowledge to understand the differences.

During the jury instructions, Judge Morley did not charge the jury with the exemptions to the New Jersey law despite arguments by the defense that Aitken met one of the exemptions and was therefore innocent of the charges. The jury returned three times requesting to be made aware of the laws that provide exemptions for lawful possession; however, all three requests were denied by the judge.

On December 20, 2010, after Aitken had spent four months in prison, New Jersey Governor Chris Christie commuted Aitken's sentence to time served, and Aitken was released from Mid-State Correctional Annex. On January 12, 2018, Governor Christie pardoned Brian Aitken.

== Post-release activities ==
In 2011, Aitken gave talks to a local Tea Party group and addressed the Students for Liberty at its annual conference.

Also in 2011, he criticized the borough of Woodland Park, New Jersey, for fining a resident (a friend of Aitken's) for refusing to remove a "Ron Paul 2012" yard sign from his front yard.

In 2014, Aitken crowdfunded over $40,000 via Indiegogo to publish a memoir, petition the Supreme Court of the United States, and attempt to gain custody of his son. After being released, Aitken announced plans to file a 42 U.S.C. § 1983 civil-rights lawsuit against the police officers, the prosecutor and the judge for their actions in the case and also to seek custody of his son.

== 2021 shooting and plea agreement ==
On November 19, 2021, Aitken was arrested after he shot a man who admitted at trial to trespassing on to Aitken's home in Telluride, Colorado and physically assaulting Aitken. The man suffered a leg wound; he was hospitalized and later discharged. Aitken was charged with attempted first-degree murder. The contractor said that he was walking away when Aitken shot him. Aitken said he acted in self-defense.

The trial began in January 2024; on February 7, 2024, the jury acquitted Aitken on the charge of second degree attempted murder; the jury could not reach a unanimous verdict on the lesser charges (such as assault, prohibited use of a firearm, and reckless endangerment).

A retrial was set for May 2024, but before the trial began, Aitken reached a plea agreement with prosecutors. Aitken pleaded nolo contendere to a misdemeanor for discharging a firearm on his property and was sentenced to one year of unsupervised probation, and the other charges were dropped.
