= Albert C. Wagner =

American corrections officer

Albert C. Wagner (1911 – June 18, 1987) was the director of the New Jersey Department of Corrections from 1966 to 1973.

== Biography ==
He was born in Trenton, New Jersey in 1911 to Mary and Albert Wagner. He attended Villanova University and the University of Pennsylvania for an MS.

He went to work for the New Jersey Department of Corrections in 1936. He worked at the Bordentown Reformatory in Bordentown, New Jersey.

A resident of Ewing Township, New Jersey, he died of a heart attack on in Portsmouth, England while on vacation, at age 76. He was buried at the First Presbyterian Church of Ewing Cemetery in Ewing Township.

== Legacy ==
The A. C. Wagner Youth Correctional Facility in Bordentown, New Jersey is named for him.
