= Frank Masini =

Italian-American serial killer

- Born: April 14, 1944 (age 82); Naples, Italy
- Conviction: Murder (4 counts)
- Penalty: Life imprisonment (minimum of 60 years)

Details
- Victims: 4
- Span of crimes: 1991–1992
- Country: United States
- State: New Jersey
- Date apprehended: December 22, 1992
- Imprisoned at: New Jersey State Prison

Frank Masini (born April 14, 1944) is an Italian-American serial killer and necrophile who murdered three elderly women and one man at their residences in Ocean and Essex County, New Jersey, from 1991 to 1992. He was arrested and confessed to all crimes to avoid a potential death sentence. He was sentenced to life in prison in 1993.

== Early life ==
Masini was born on April 14, 1944, in Naples, Italy. He moved to the United States at age 17 and settled in Livingston, New Jersey. Masini wound up in the grasps of law enforcement as early as 1966, when he was convicted of burglary. After his release, he found work in low-skilled labor. He married a woman named Anna with whom he fathered two children. He owned two homes and found work as a handyman.

== Murders ==
On November 24, 1991, Masini visited his aunt, 85-year-old Anna Masini at her home to use the telephone, but eventually started up a conversation with her, in which the two chatted over soft drinks. After finishing, he attacked Anna with a knife, stabbing her in the neck repeatedly until her death. Afterwards he sexually assaulted the body and fled the home. Anna's body was eventually found on November 27, but Masini would not become a suspect in that murder, and it sat unsolved for the next year while Masini continued his travels. On December 11, 1991, Masini was prowling through East Orange, when he entered the home of 79-year-old Angelina Ialeggio. Ialeggio was known to Masini, who was a relative via marriage. While at the home, Masini grabbed a knife, and like the first victim, he began a violent attack on Angelina, in which he sexually assaulted her while stabbing her. After the killing, Masini pocketed money and left the home.

On November 24, 1992, exactly a year after killing his aunt, Masini went to the home of 81-year-old Michael Krieger and his wife 78-year-old Betty, a retired couple living in West Orange. The couple was expected to attend a Thanksgiving party in New York the next day when they agreed to let Masini do some house work. Masini had done carpentry work at their house in the past, since the 1980s. Masini first attacked Michael with a letter opener after discussing floor work. When Betty came to see what was going on, Masini attempted to hide, but when she saw what he had done to Michael, Masini stabbed her in the back. The next day, the Krieger's son reported to the police to pay a visit to their home, and they discovered the bodies. In the initial investigation, they found items from the home had been stolen. Since no evidence of forced entry could be found, police focused their investigation on people possibly close to the Kriegers. Masini, who was known to have done carpentry work for the couple was questioned, but insisted he had nothing to do with it. However, after police located a bloody footprint the killer left behind at the home, they matched it to a pair of specialized hiking boots that Masini owned, and he was arrested.

== Criminal proceedings ==
While Masini was in jail, police and other authorities searched his home in Orange, and found his wife to be wearing a ring which Angelina Ialeggio had owned. Thus, on December 23, Masini was charged with Ialeggio's murder, and held on $1,000,000 bail. Detectives began a careful examination of Masini's movements, and they thus connected him to the unsolved murder of his aunt Anna in November 1991. Superior Court Judge Joseph Falcon ruled that Masini had to give blood, hair and saliva samples to investigators.

He pleaded not guilty to all charges, despite the overwhelming evidence; each victim Masini was acquainted with, all were killed on a Wednesday, all were elderly, the female victims had been sexually assaulted, and all were stabbed in the neck. Subsequently, Masini went under two psychiatric tests, all of which confirmed he was competent to stand trial.

After some time, Masini eventually turned over his plea, and admitted what he had done; the possibility of the death penalty was thrown away, and other charges, such as robbery and sexual assault, were dropped. It also meant that Masini would skip a trial. During his sentencing in April 1993, Masini exchanged to Judge Joseph Falcon "I need help. Please help me. I am very sorry. God forgive me". Masini was initially sentenced to life imprisonment for the murders, with the possibility of parole after serving 60 years. He will not become eligible for parole until December 20, 2052.

== See also ==
- List of serial killers in the United States
