= New Jersey State Prison =

State prison for men in Trenton, New Jersey

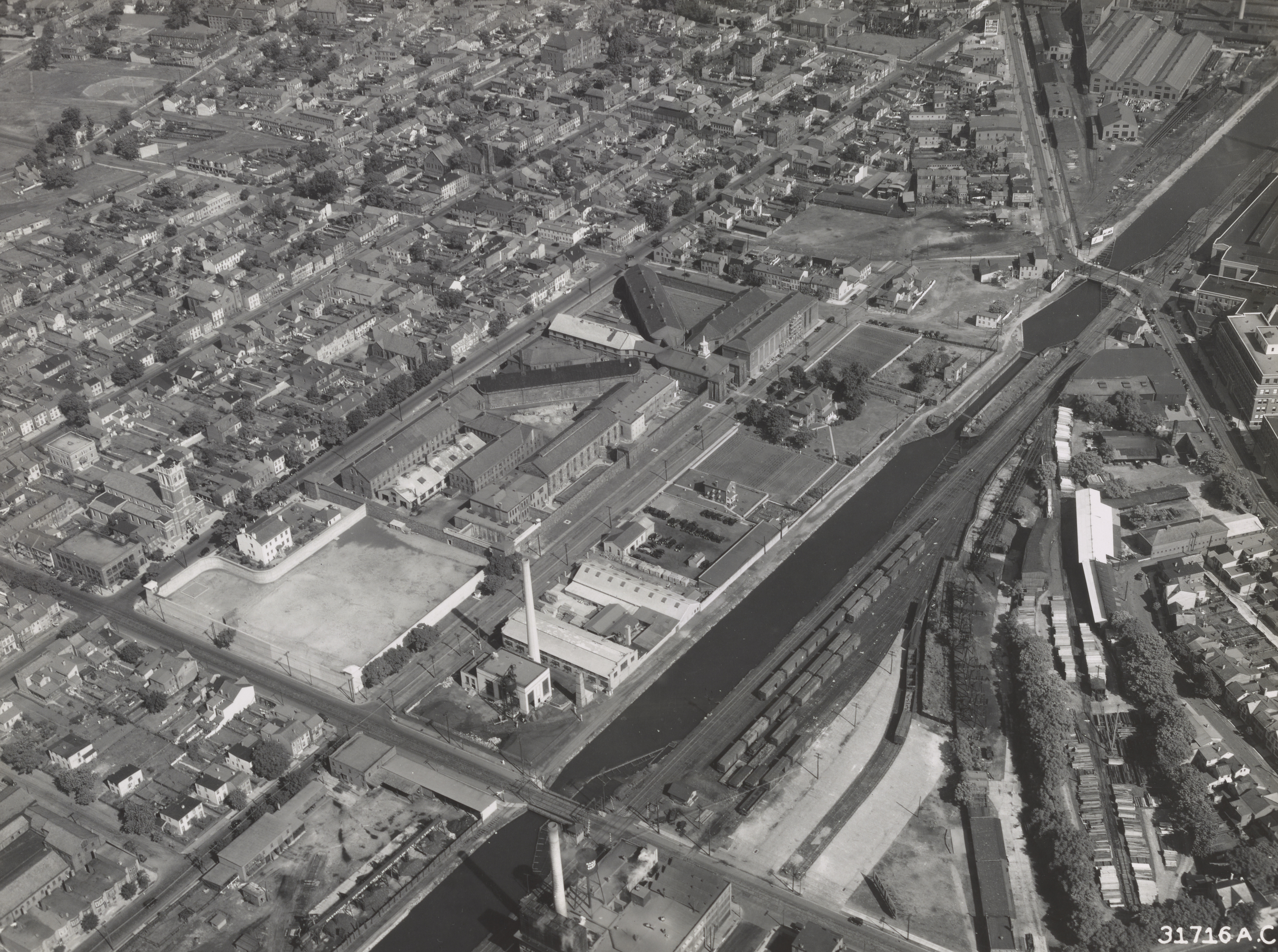
- Aerial view of the prison in the 1940s
- Interactive map of New Jersey State Prison
- Location: Trenton, New Jersey; 40°12′25″N 74°45′24″W
- Status: Operational
- Security class: Maximum
- Capacity: 1,819
- Population: 1,620 (January 1, 2016)
- Opened: 1836 (190 years ago)
- Former name: Trenton State Prison
- Managed by: New Jersey Department of Corrections
- Website: NJ Department of Corrections

The New Jersey State Prison (NJSP), formerly known as Trenton State Prison, is a state men's prison in Trenton, New Jersey operated by the New Jersey Department of Corrections. It is the oldest prison in New Jersey and one of the oldest correctional facilities in the United States. It is the state's only completely maximum security institution, housing the most difficult and/or dangerous male offenders in the inmate population. NJSP operates two security units and provides a high level of custodial supervision and control. Professional treatment services, such as education and social work, are a priority at the facility. The Bureau of State Use Industries operated the bedding and clothing shops that were once located in Shop Hall at the facility. These industries have been relocated to South Woods State Prison.

NJSP also housed New Jersey's death row for men and execution chamber until the state abolished capital punishment in 2007. One notable inmate is Jesse Timmendequas, who was formerly on death row for the rape and murder of 7-year-old Megan Kanka. This crime inspired the passing of Megan's Law, which requires communities to be notified when a convicted sex offender moves into their area.

== History ==
The New Jersey State Prison is a complex that consists of three separate but interconnected physical plants from three different eras of prison construction that took place on the property. The three sections are the 1798 Penitentiary House, the 1832 Fortress Penitentiary, and the 1982 contemporary prison facility.

The 1798 Penitentiary House, which was the first state prison in New Jersey and the third in the nation after the Walnut Street Jail in Philadelphia and Newgate in New York City, is also the oldest building still in operation as part of an active, working prison in the United States. This allows NJSP to lay claim to being the oldest continuously operating state prison in the US. The only surviving portion of the 1798 Penitentiary House is the original Front House, which functioned originally as the living quarters for the Keeper of the State Prison, the four Assistant Keepers (the first 4 men who served in the capacity of what are known today as State Correction Officers), the Armory, administrative office space on the first floor and a row of cells for the confinement of disruptive prisoners in the basement. Since the Penitentiary House stopped housing prisoners within a few years after the 1832 Fortress Penitentiary opened, the Auburn Correctional Facility can lay claim to having the oldest continuously operating cell house in the US.

After completion and the relocation of the Penitentiary House inmates to the new John Haviland-designed Fortress Penitentiary compound in 1836, the 1798 facility alternately served as Mercer County's jail facility during construction of their workhouse in Titusville, and then as the state arsenal until 1929, when all National Guard equipment and services that were based there were transferred to the newly completed ANG base at Sea Girt, at which time control of the empty compound was returned to the prison. In 1930, all of the Penitentiary House buildings were demolished, with the exception of the Front House, which was remodeled into a residence for the Keeper of the State Prison, a use for which it is still designated today. The cleared land on which the Penitentiary House cell houses and shop buildings had stood previously were enclosed in a 22 foot high reinforced concrete wall and opened as the Big Yard in 1930. This new, large recreation yard eased the cramped conditions inside the walls of the main compound, which up until that time had limited space to devote to outside recreation.

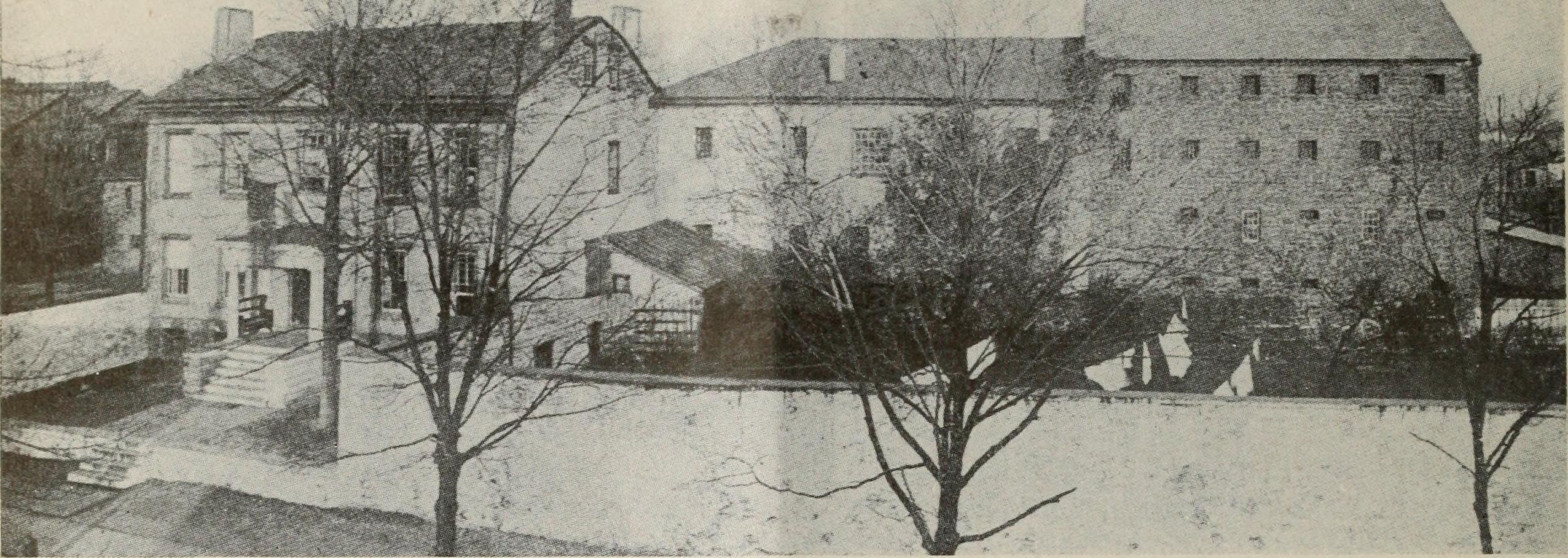
Prison in 1917

In his 1917 master's thesis, published as "History of the Penal, Reformatory and Correctional Institutions of New Jersey" the late Dr. Harry Elmer Barnes, a noted American historian, published a history and analysis of the state prisons, reformatories and penal institutions of New Jersey up to that time. His work was an analysis of the application of the various penal philosophies and their successes, failures and changes from 1798 to 1917. He separated the Penitentiary House and the 1832 Fortress Penitentiary into two "systems" in this work. The term "system" as used by Barnes was at that time used as "paradigm" is today — his "First Prison System in NJ" as applied to the Penitentiary House and "Second Prison System in NJ" as applied to the 1832 facility did not describe two separate prisons nor did it indicate two separate prison agencies.

This was a history and description of New Jersey's transition away from the "congregate system" of confinement, wherein all persons regardless of age, sex or mental state were simply confined in the Penitentiary House, to the "Pennsylvania system" of confinement, which consisted of keeping prisoners confined in single cells, completely isolated from other prisoners and the Keepers. The authority and management of the State Prison as an agency did not change – The Keeper as the agency head supervised the Penitentiary House, oversaw and contributed inmate labor to the construction of the Fortress Penitentiary between 1832 and 1836, and supervised the transfer of all inmates from the old to the new compound in 1836 and continued on in the new compound. This construction, transfer and continuation of operations from one side of the property to the other provides a link between the old and new compounds, and demonstrates that the New Jersey State Prison has existed and continuously operated in the same location since 1798. Thus, Dr. Barnes described a change in penal theory and practice, not the abolition of the old buildings and governing agency and the substitution of a new one. No break in operation or management occurred.

The 1832 facility was expanded several times throughout the 19th Century with new construction adding wings in the years between 1859 and 1907, and larger Shop Hall buildings as well. In 1895–96 when 6 Wing was constructed, the original walls were extended to the corners of the old Penitentiary House compound to enclose that wing as well as the newer Shop Hall building, which heretofore had been outside the main walls.

In 1918, New Jersey corrections officials and prison advocates supported demolishing the New Jersey State Prison, considering its portions built between 1832 and 1836 using prison labor to be badly outdated. Following prison riots in 1952, a committee again pressured Governor Alfred E. Driscoll to replace the facility. While two of the three wings were built between 1979 and 1982, the oldest wing remains in use. In 2011, the Department of Corrections unsuccessfully sought $200 million to replace the West Compound, its oldest portion, to avoid class-action litigation over poor housing conditions. In September 2025, the state's Corrections Ombudsperson reported on the facility's poor conditions and recommended replacing the West Compound.

== Death row ==
Prior to the 2007 repeal of the death penalty, the death row for men and execution chamber was in the Capital Sentence Unit (CSU) at the New Jersey State Prison. This unit was first established in 1907 to transition death sentences away from county jails toward state-run executions using the new electric chair, built by Carl Adams of Trenton, in the shops of his Adams Electric Company. The first execution by electrocution occurred on December 11, 1907. The last such electrocution took place in 1963. In 1979 the Death House (8 Wing), along with the old hospital wing were demolished to make way for a new Gymnasium.

In 1999 death row inmate Robert "Mudman" Simon, who was convicted of killing a police officer, died during a fight. The lethal injection chamber at the prison was never used, and the death penalty was repealed in December 2007. Therefore, the final execution to take place at the prison was a January 22, 1963 electrocution. The former lethal injection room now serves as an office.

The prison is divided into security zones, including a 'red list' designation for inmates classified as high risk. This zone houses prisoners with serious criminal histories such as Class A felonies or those deemed to pose significant threats to institutional security due to their influence within the inmate population.

== Notable inmates ==
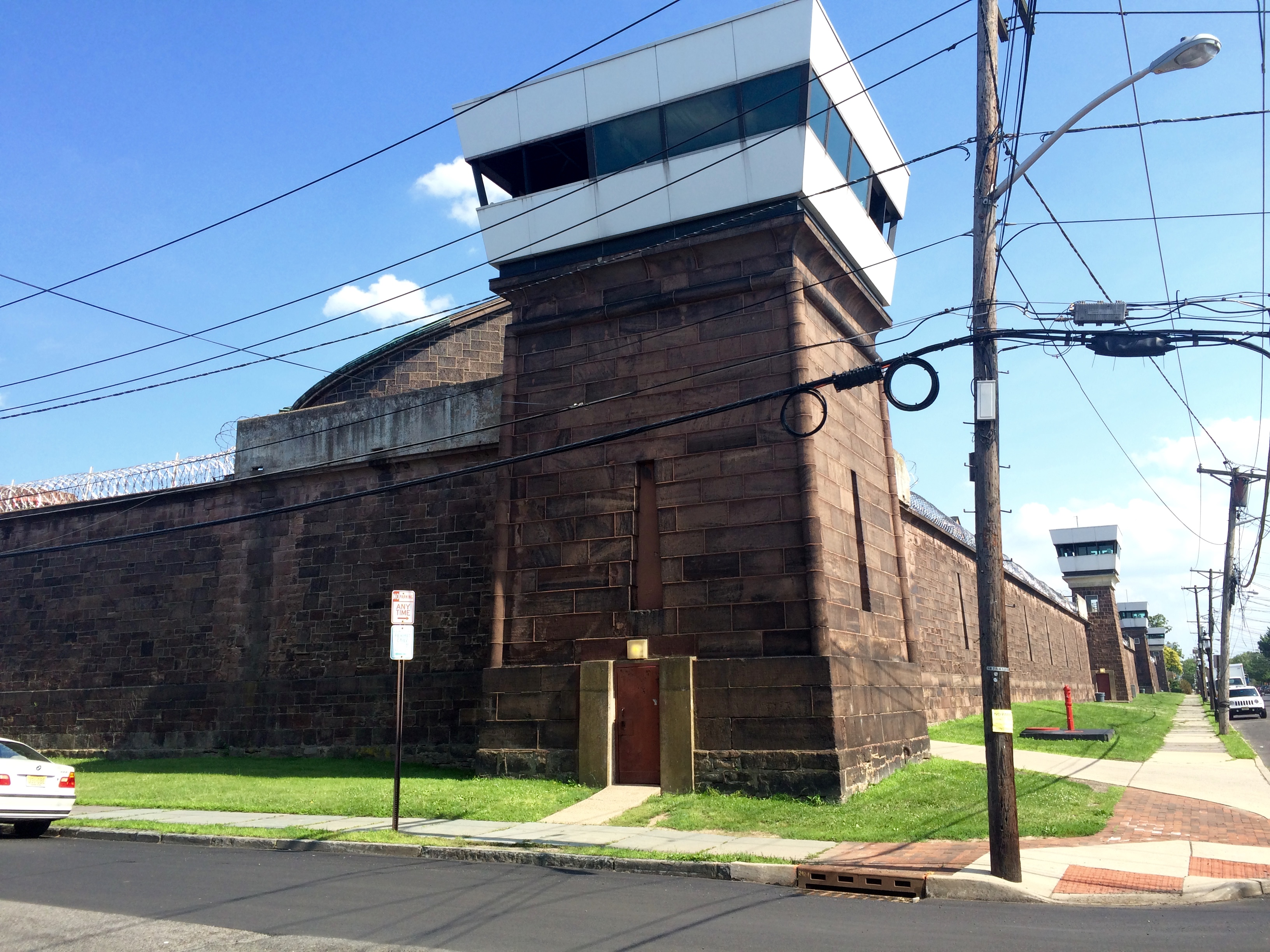
Part of the 1832 "Fortress" portion of the prison, with modern modifications

- Sundiata Acoli, a former member of the Black Panther Party and the Black Liberation Army who was sentenced to life in prison in 1974 for murdering a New Jersey state trooper.
- Max B (2009–present) Rapper/former member of Byrdgang. Refused a 10-year plea deal hoping to beat the charges and return to rapping. Sentenced to 17 to 20 years for first-degree aggravated manslaughter.
- Anthony Balaam, serial killer who murdered four sex workers.
- Richard Fran Biegenwald (1940–2008), serial killer who killed at least nine and is suspected in at least two other murders. Operated in Monmouth County, New Jersey in the early 1980s.
- Rubin Carter (1957–1966, 1967–1985), boxer wrongly convicted of murder. He was released in 1985 and went on to become an activist for the wrongly convicted.
- Ricardo Cepates (1971–present), Honduran immigrant who raped multiple women and young girls in New Brunswick between 2001 and 2003.
- Vernon Collins (1950–present), Baltimore narcotics hit man; the inspiration for the character Wee-Bey Brice of The Wire.
- Richard Cottingham (1946–present), serial killer from New Jersey who tortured, killed and dismembered at least six women and possibly many more from 1967 to 1980.
- Charles Cullen (1960–present), New Jersey's most prolific serial killer. Admitted to killing at least 35 people while working as a nurse in numerous New Jersey and Pennsylvania hospitals.
- Jerome Dennis, serial killer who murdered five women and teenage girls.
- Bruno Hauptmann, executed for the kidnapping and murder of Charles Lindbergh's toddler son.
- Ralph Hudson (1920–1963), convicted of murdering his wife. He was the final person executed in New Jersey's history.
- James Koedatich (1948–present), was sentenced to death for raping and murdering two women in two months in late 1982. His sentence was commuted to life imprisonment.
- Peter Kudzinowski (1903–1929), serial killer who killed a man and two children. He was executed in 1929.
- Richard Kuklinski (1935–2006), mafia hit man known as "The Iceman" who was connected to the Gambino crime family.
- John List killed his entire family. Nicknamed "The Boogeyman of Westfield".
- Frank Masini (1944–present), serial killer who murdered four elderly people. Active around Ocean and Essex County.
- Robert O. Marshall (1939–2015), originally sentenced to death for hiring a hit-man from Louisiana to kill his wife, his sentence was commuted to life in prison.
- Kai the Hitchhiker was an internet sensation. However, McGillvary was arrested on murder charges on May 16, 2013, for the death of New Jersey attorney Joseph Galfy. In 2019 a jury found him guilty of first-degree murder and he was sentenced to 57 years in prison.
- Joseph Vincent Moriarty (1910?–1979), numbers racketeer.
- Fred Neulander The Cherry Hill rabbi who paid Len Jenoff and drifter Paul Daniels $18,000 to kill his wife Carol on November 1, 1994.
- James Allen Paul (1947–2000), sentenced to life imprisonment for the murder of 47-year-old Virginia Vickory. Additionally believed to have murdered two others in Vermont and Connecticut for which he was not brought to trial.
- Ahmad Khan Rahimi (2016–present), suspected perpetrator of the 2016 New York and New Jersey bombings.
- Richard Rogers, serial killer who murdered and dismembered at least two gay and bisexual men between 1992 and 1993.
- Edgar Smith, convicted murderer
- Leroy Snyder (1931–2001), serial killer who killed seven people within a year in Camden, New Jersey.
- Elmer Edward Solly (1945–2007), convicted of manslaughter and best known for his escape from prison and twenty-seven years as a fugitive.
- Steven Spader, convicted for the home invasion and murder of Kimberly Cates in Mont Vernon, New Hampshire.
- Jerry Spraggins (1967–present), convicted for the 1983 sexual assault and murder of an elderly woman at her apartment in Montclair. Tried, but acquitted, for two similar deaths at that same apartment from 1981 to 1983.
- Jesse Timmendequas (1961–present), who was sentenced to death for the rape and murder of seven-year-old Megan Kanka, which led to the passage of Megan's Law.
- Lloyd Woodson, sentenced to 14.5 years in 2012 for attempted armed robbery (second degree), possession of a firearm for unlawful purpose, unlawful possession of a rifle, possession of a defaced firearm, possession of hollow-point bullets, and possession of high-capacity ammunition magazines.
- Khalil Wheeler-Weaver, serial killer sentenced to 160 years in prison for killing three women and trying to kill a fourth.
- Christopher Walwrath, Former New York State Corrections officer convicted in the murder of Robert Brooks in 2025.
