= James Allen Paul =

American spree killer

- Paul in court
- Born: April 19, 1947; Norfolk, Virginia, U.S.
- Died: March 3, 2000 (aged 52); New Jersey State Prison, Trenton, New Jersey, U.S.
- Other names: James Dalton; Steve Sanders
- Conviction: Murder
- Penalty: Life imprisonment

Details
- Victims: 3
- Span of crimes: May 15 – 22, 1984
- Country: United States
- States: New Jersey, Connecticut, Vermont

James Allen Paul (April 19, 1947 – March 3, 2000) was an American spree killer who murdered three people during a seven-day rampage across three states during May 1984.

Paul was born on April 19, 1947, in Norfolk, Virginia. Little is known about his early life, but in his adult years Paul obtained work as stable hand for farms. In 1983, Paul moved to Room 1 at the Belvedere Motel on Route 22 in Readington Township, New Jersey. At the same motel lived 47-year-old Virginia Vickory.

On May 15, 1984, Vickory was found murdered in a field in Readington Township, having been shot in the face at a close range. Police quickly circled in on Paul, then 37 years old, who also went under multiple aliases including James Dalton and Steve Sanders. Paul fled to Connecticut not long after and, on May 17, 18-year-old Robin White went missing. Investigators believe White may have been hitchhiking and Paul offered her a ride and later killed her. White's body was found along a road in Portland, Connecticut on May 20, shot to death with the same gun used to kill Vickory. Then, on May 22, 45-year-old George Call, a nurse of 10 years at the Sullivan Home nursing home, was found shot to death at a rest area along Interstate 91 in Springfield, Vermont. He had been shot in the face twice, just like Vickory, with his wallet stolen.

A warrant was put out for Paul's arrest after Call's murder, and numerous tips began to flow in. Paul was considered armed and dangerous, and a nationwide alert was issued. Some of the tips sent by people began to shed light on Paul's whereabouts. Investigators began to develop a theory that Paul would return to New Jersey to pay a phone call from a family member. They tracked Paul's potential movements to a diner in Arlington, New Jersey, where he was trying to call a relative, and they arrested him. They found that Paul had been in possession of Vickory's car, and had a .22 caliber handgun latched onto him. Paul was held without bail at the Hunterdon County Jail until he was formally charged with Vickory's murder.

Paul was additionally charged with the killings of White and Call; however, he never went to trial for their murders. He was due to stand trial for Vickory's murder, and to avoid a possible death sentence, Paul pleaded guilty to Vickory's murder, as well as burglary and other charges, and was sentenced to life imprisonment. For the remainder of his sentence, Paul remained in custody at New Jersey State Prison, which he stayed in until he died on March 3, 2000.
