= Garden State Youth Correctional Facility =

Prison in New Jersey, United States

- Location within New Jersey
- Location: Crosswicks, New Jersey; 40°09′34″N 74°40′35″W
- Status: Operational
- Security class: Minimum to maximum
- Capacity: 1511
- Opened: 1968
- Managed by: New Jersey Department of Corrections

Garden State Youth Correctional Facility is a New Jersey Department of Corrections state prison that houses young adult offenders ages 18-30, located in the Crosswicks section of Chesterfield Township in Burlington County, New Jersey, United States. The facility opened in 1968 and has a maximum capacity of 1511 inmates.

As of 2025 its population is now 961.

== Notable Inmates ==
- Christopher Gregor
- Assata Olugbala Shakur
