= Leroy Snyder =

American serial killer

- Mugshot c. 1969
- Born: February 13, 1931; Camden, New Jersey, U.S.
- Died: October 1, 2001 (aged 70); New Jersey State Prison, Trenton, New Jersey, U.S.
- Other name: "Duke"
- Conviction: First degree murder (3 counts)
- Penalty: Life imprisonment

Details
- Victims: 7
- Span of crimes: February 14 – September 8, 1969
- Country: United States
- State: New Jersey
- Date apprehended: September 11, 1969

Leroy Snyder (February 13, 1931 – October 1, 2001) was an American serial killer who, in 1969, murdered six women and one man in Camden, New Jersey, while on parole for armed robbery. After his arrest, he pleaded guilty to each crime to avoid a potential death sentence and was given six life sentences, dying in prison in 2001.

== Early life ==
Snyder was born in Camden on February 13, 1931, the fifth in a family of seven children. The family was seriously dysfunctional and they lived in a socially disadvantageous environment, as Leroy and his siblings were raised in multiple locations. In the mid-1940s, Leroy, along with other siblings returned to Camden, where he sparked his early criminal escapades.

== Crimes ==
In December 1949, at age 18, Snyder attempted to strangle a local woman using a clothesline. Arrested not long after, he was jailed only briefly before being released and returning to Camden. There, he was apprehended by authorities after making vulgar threats of rape to two young women. He was jailed again for four years before being released in June 1955.

Snyder was once again arrested in July 1955 for robbing and assaulting a cab driver in Philadelphia, Pennsylvania, for which he was given a five-year sentence. Another arrest came in 1959 for armed robbery, for which he was sentenced to ten years imprisonment. He was incarcerated at New Jersey State Prison until being paroled in December 1968.

=== Murders ===
Between February and September 1969, a series of shockingly brutal murders rocked Camden and the surrounding areas. It was the worst murder-spree the city dealt with in 20 years. Six women and one man were killed:

- Lula Crawley (45) – killed on February 14, 1969. She was stabbed to death in her South Camden furniture store. She was found lying face down in a pool of blood, gagged, with her hands bound behind her back with heavy twine. An autopsy found that she was stabbed 13 times in the chest, neck and back. Witnesses reported seeing a suspicious black man wandering around the store the day of Crawley's murder, and a sketch of the suspect was drawn and publicized in local newspapers.
- Mary Freeman (56) – killed on April 12, 1969. She was found floating face down in a foot-and-a-half of water in a vacant house. She had allegedly engaged in prostitution. An autopsy report indicated that Freeman had been raped and stabbed to death.
- Shirley Brittingham (32) and Warren Wells (27) – killed on April 25, 1969. Brittingham was six months pregnant when she was brutally beaten, shot multiple times, and stabbed to death, while Wells had his throat slashed and was shot in the back six times. Their bodies were discovered in the basement of an abandoned home on Commerce Street.
- Lovie Williams (52) – killed on May 19, 1969. She was found in her home with her face badly beaten and her stomach slit open.
- Vera Stevens (45) – killed on August 9, 1969. She was found beaten to death. An autopsy report indicated that Stevens had been raped.
- Gertrude Friedman (58) – killed on September 8, 1969. She was working alone at her linoleum store when the intruder entered and attacked her. She was repeatedly raped before her throat was slit with a knife. Her body was found later that day after a customer entered the store and was alarmed by nobody attending the counter. Her wristwatch was stolen and some of the clothes she had been wearing were missing.

== Arrest ==
Three days after Friedman's murder, authorities raided Snyder's home on Cherry Street and arrested him for murder. Police recovered Friedman's stolen watch and several of her missing clothes from his house. After his arrest, the brutal murders in Camden abruptly came to an end. Before Snyder's capture, two men were arrested as suspects in the killings and later cleared of suspicion:

- Richard Morton, 32, was arrested in May 1969 and charged with murder of Lovie Williams. He was seen welding a hunting knife in her neighborhood the day of the murder. He was released and cleared of suspicion not long after.
- William McDaniels, 29, was a soldier in the U.S. Army who at the time was AWOL and laying low in Camden. He was arrested on June 13, 1969, and charged with the murders of Brittingham and Wells. He was released from custody and cleared of suspicion only a few days later.

Snyder was questioned in the other murders by detectives Earl Smith and Nate Jones. He confessed to each murder with graphic details that had not originally been made public. Authorities also investigated Snyder's possible involvement in three additional murders committed in the Camden area, but he was eventually ruled out as a suspect.

== Imprisonment and death ==
Under New Jersey law, Snyder couldn't be sentenced to death after a confession, so on July 17, 1970, Snyder was sentenced to three terms of life imprisonment.

Snyder was required to serve at least 43½ years of his sentence before being considered for parole, which would have been in 2014. On October 1, 2001, Snyder, who had served 31 years of his initial sentence, died at New Jersey State Prison at age 70.

== See also ==
- List of serial killers in the United States
