= Central Reception and Assignment Facility =

Intake and central processing facility for the New Jersey prison system

Coordinates: 40°14′50″N 74°48′17″W

Central Reception and Assignment Facility (CLOSED)
- Interactive map of Central Reception and Assignment Facility (CLOSED)
- Location: 2401 Stuyvesant Avenue Trenton, New Jersey
- Status: Closed
- Security class: Mixed
- Capacity: 562
- Opened: 1997
- Closed: 2021
- Managed by: New Jersey Department of Corrections

Central Reception and Assignment Facility (CRAF) is an intake and central processing facility for the New Jersey prison system, located in Trenton, New Jersey. It was opened in 1997, closed in 2021.
