= Joseph Vincent Moriarty =

- Joseph Vincent Moriarty on September 29, 1960
- Born: June , 1910; Jersey City, New Jersey, US
- Died: February 26, 1979 (aged 68); Jersey City, New Jersey, US
- Other name: Newsboy Moriarty
- Years active: 1923-1975
- Status: Deceased
- Criminal charges: Bookmaking (N.J.S. 2A:112-3) Possession of lottery slips (N.J.S. 2A:121-3) (1962); Tax evasion (1971)

Details
- Imprisoned at: New Jersey State Prison

Joseph Vincent Moriarty (June 1910 – February 26, 1979), also known as Newsboy Moriarty, was an Irish American mobster in Hudson County, New Jersey who controlled the numbers game.

== Biography ==
He was born in June 1910 in Jersey City, New Jersey to Ellen Hussion (1884–?) and Michael Moriarty (1883-c1919) of County Galway, Ireland who had married on April 15, 1906, in Somerville, Massachusetts.

He got started in the numbers racket when he was 13 years old, around 1923. He always wore the same set of inexpensive clothes. By the 1950s he lived with his two sisters in a small brownstone in the Horseshoe section of Jersey City that housed the poor Irish immigrants.

In the numbers game a player picks any three-digit number and bets anywhere from a few pennies to a few dollars. The wager would be placed at a neighborhood candy store, newsstand, or tavern. Each day, the winning number is determined, and there may be none, one, or multiple winners. The number was usually the last three digits of attendance figures at a specified race track or the dollar figures of U.S. Treasury receipts, published in the next day's newspapers, or another tamper-proof number. A player's chance of winning with any given bet is one in 1,000 for a three digit number, 10 x 10 x 10.

On September 15, 1958, a Jersey Central commuter train carrying 200 passengers plunged off the Newark Bay railroad drawbridge, which was open for marine traffic. The engineer had disregarded a stop signal. Both diesel locomotives and the first two coaches plunged into Newark Bay and sank immediately, killing 48 people. A third coach, number 932, snagged by its rear truck, hung precariously off the lift bridge for two hours before it also toppled into the water. An Associated Press photo of the disaster made the front pages of the newspapers with the numbers 9-3-2 appearing on the side of the train. That number received a large number of bets and was the winning number the following day. Moriarty was able to pay in full and that brought him to the attention of Mike Coppola, which may have led to Moriarty's arrest in Jersey City.

Moriarty was arrested for possession of betting slips and was placed in New Jersey State Prison. On July 2, 1962, while he was in prison, two day laborers who were fixing a garage came across his 1947 Plymouth at 47 Oxford Avenue in Jersey City. In the trunk was $2.6 million in cash (equivalent to $27.7 million in 2025), and $13,000 in stocks and bonds. On July 3, 1962, FBI agents seized the assets. He originally denied ownership but then filed a tax form listing them as income.

He was released from prison in 1965.

In 1971, he was reportedly kidnapped and tortured by people seeking to locate other cash.

He was rearrested and sent to prison and ordered to pay $1.5 million in federal income taxes in 1972. By the end of his career in crime, he had been arrested 47 times. Around 1975, while serving another prison term on betting charges, he was diagnosed with prostate cancer. In 1976, in his mid-60s, his sentence was commuted by New Jersey Governor Brendan Byrne. Moriarty died three years later, on February 26, 1979, in Christ Hospital, Jersey City.
