= William H. Fauver Youth Correctional Facility =

Prison in New Jersey, United States

Coordinates: 40°38′58″N 74°51′50″W

- Interactive map of William H. Fauver Youth Correctional Facility
- Location: 31 Petticoat Lane Annandale, New Jersey
- Status: Open
- Security class: Mixed (youth facility)
- Capacity: 808
- Opened: 1929
- Managed by: New Jersey Department of Corrections

William H. Fauver Youth Correctional Facility (formerly known as Mountainview Youth Correctional Facility) is a New Jersey Department of Corrections state prison for young adult offenders ages 18-30, located in the Annandale section of Clinton Township in Hunterdon County, New Jersey, United States. The present-day facility has a maximum capacity of 808 juvenile inmates.

The grounds encompass "747 acres of rolling hills", first used by the state in 1913 for a farm facility for the mentally ill. It was redesignated as a corrections site for males between 16 and 26, "Annandale Farms", in 1929.

From at least 2008, the prison has had a difficult history. Two inmates have been murdered inside in recent years (Carl J. Epps, Jr. in August 2010, and Joshua Jones in August 2012), amid a long litany of assaults, drugs offenses, and inappropriate romantic relationships.

In February 2021 it was revealed that the prison would close in the coming year, as part of the state's $44.8 billion spending proposal.
