= Northern State Prison =

Prison in New Jersey, United States

Coordinates: 40.713°N 74.173°W

- Interactive map of Northern State Prison
- Location: 168 Frontage Road Newark, New Jersey
- Status: Open
- Security class: Minimum-Maximum
- Capacity: 2615
- Opened: 1987
- Managed by: New Jersey Department of Corrections

Northern State Prison is a state-run prison located at 168 Frontage Road in Newark, New Jersey, for male offenders. It is operated by the New Jersey Department of Corrections. Northern State Prison offers community service activities to all minimum security inmates. The prison also houses the Security Threat Group Management Unit, which provides treatment to inmates affiliated with gangs that threaten the security of the institution.

As of August 1, 2006, Northern State Prison housed 2,615 inmates.

As of 2025 the population is now 2,179.

== Notable inmates ==
- Max B – served 16 years starting in 2009
- Larry Ray - served six months in 2000 for violation of parole, interference with child custody, bail jumping, and contempt of court
- Chuck Wepner – served 17 months starting in 1988 on drug charges when he was found with four ounces of cocaine
