= Pomona Hall =

Historic house in New Jersey, United States

- U.S. National Register of Historic Places
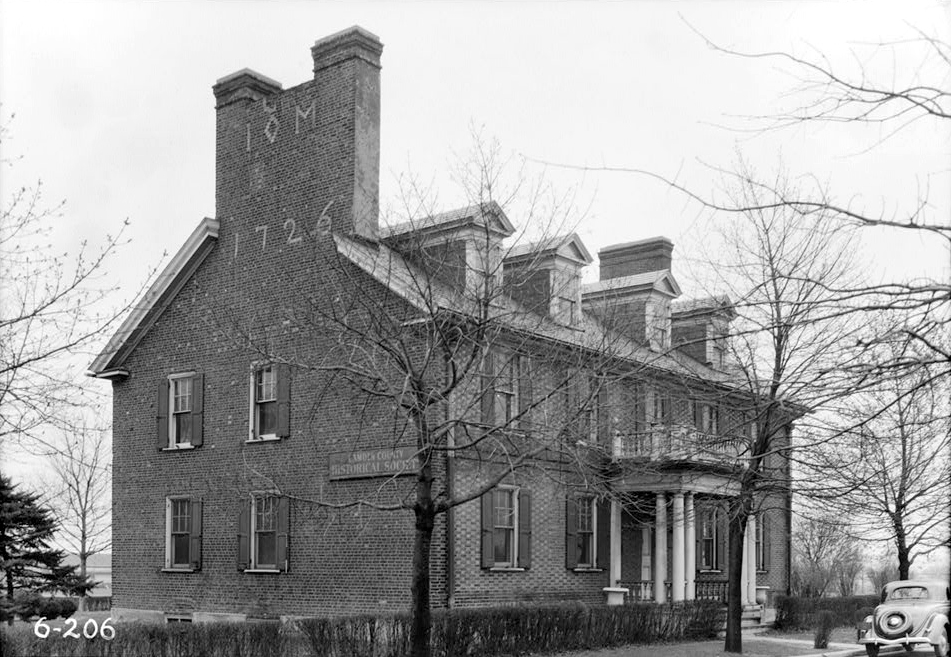

- Location within Camden County, New Jersey Location within New Jersey Location within the United States
- Location: Park Boulevard and Euclid Avenue, Camden, New Jersey
- Coordinates: 39°55′51″N 75°5′40″W
- Area: 0 acres (0 ha)
- Built: 1726
- NRHP reference No.: 71000499
- Added to NRHP: August 12, 1971

Pomona Hall is a colonial mansion located at 1900 Park Boulevard and Euclid Avenue, in Camden, Camden County, New Jersey, United States, that operates as a museum by the Camden County Historical Society. The first building on the site was constructed in 1718, while construction of the more substantial mansion house was started in 1726, with later additions made in 1788. It is not known when the house was first called Pomona Hall; but it is marked on Hill's Map of Philadelphia and Environs, published in 1809.

== Historical data ==
Joseph Cooper Jr., who built the first part of Pomona Hall, was the son of Joseph Cooper Sr., and the grandson of William Cooper, who came to the American colonies from England in 1676 or 1679. He settled first at Burlington, moving to Pyne Point in 1681. Here he purchased a tract of three hundred acres from the proprietors and from the Indian chief Tallacca. On June 12, 1697, Joseph Cooper Sr., purchased a tract of four hundred and twelve acres from Abraham and Joshua Carpenter along the south branch of Cooper's Creek. This tract was conveyed to his son Joseph Jr., on December 16, 1714. Initials on the north chimney breast indicate that Joseph and Mary Cooper built that portion of the house in 1726. Joseph Cooper died in 1749. The property passed to his younger brother, Isaac.

Joseph Cooper was a member of the New Jersey General Assembly from Gloucester County from 1760 to 1749. He was a friend of Benjamin Franklin. Franklin mentions him as one of the friends he acquired during his stay in Burlington. The memorial and the record of the Friends Meeting of Haddonfield says of him:

"He was an exemplary friend, and serviceable amongst us in many respects, careful to rule in his own house. He departed this life about the first of the eighth month 1749, having express‘d little before that he had done justly, loved mercy, and hoped that he had been careful to walk humbly.

The next owner of Pomona Hall was Marmaduke Cooper, Isaac's son. Marmaduke, although a Quaker (Religious Society of Friends), took part in the struggle between the mother country and the colonies before the war started. He was a member of the Committee of Observation for Gloucester County and a member of the Committee of Correspondence. When the Philadelphia Meeting of Suffering advised all Friends to be conscientious objectors, he withdrew from all activities.

In 1788 Marmaduke built the south portion of Pomona Hall. The marking on the breast of the other chimney indicates that Marmaduke and Mary Cooper were the builders. This later portion conforms to the architecture of the rest of the house. The addition is clearly shown by the vertical joint in the brickwork on both front and rear walls close by the hallway doors, and also by the headings of the cellar windows, the older part was crudely arched by a single row of bricks while in the newer section keyed stone lintels are used.

The north wall of the hallway was one of the original outside walls; it is carried to the roof beams. The partition walls running laterally between the front and the back rooms on the north side of the house furnish the support for the ceiling rafters of the attic rooms. The woodwork of the older part of the house is marked by severe simplicity and symmetrical lines. The newels are plain; the balustrades are gracefully turned and fastened by wooden pegs. In the original living room, which is on the left side of the hallway, is a fireplace which originally had a facing of blue tiles.

== Architecture ==
Pomona Hall has been restored to its appearance during the American Revolution. It has been called the "finest example of a Georgian style plantation house in New Jersey."

The Historic American Buildings Survey (HABS) conducted a detailed survey of the building in 1936, creating architectural drawings and photographs of the existing conditions and gathering documents about the history of the building.

- Owner: City of Camden. The building is occupied by the Camden County Historical Society.
- Date of Erection: 1726–1788
- Architect: unknown
- Builder: Joseph Cooper Jr. for the 1726 section; Marmaduke Cooper for the newer section
- Present Condition: Good (1936)
- Number of Stories: Two and one-half
- Materials of Construction:
  - Foundation - Stone
  - Exterior walls - front Flemish bond with black glazed headers; west elevation in alternating header and stretcher rows; the end walls form gables as settings for the wide chimney breast
  - Interior walls - Plaster; left side of hall wide tongued groved boards, most fireplace ends paneled
  - Roof - Pitch with dormers and with a roof walk between the chimney breasts

== See also ==
- Joseph Cooper House
- Benjamin Cooper House
- National Register of Historic Places listings in Camden County, New Jersey
- List of the oldest buildings in New Jersey

== Bibliography ==
- Boyer, C.S. "Pomona Hall, The Home of Joseph Cooper, Jr." A reprint of articles appearing in the West Jersey Press of June 2,9, and 16, 1955
- Clement, John (1787). Sketches of the First Emigrant Settlers in Newton Township, Old Gloucester County Camden. Joseph Crukshank.
- A Collection of Memorials Concerning Divers deceased Ministers and others of the people called Quakers in Pennsylvania, New Jersey, and Parts adjacent Philadelphia. Joseph Crukshank. 1787.
- Cooper, H. E. (1787). Sketches of the First Emigrant Settlers in Newton Township, Old Gloucester County Camden. Joseph Crukshank.
