= Peter Kudzinowski =

American serial killer (1903–1929)

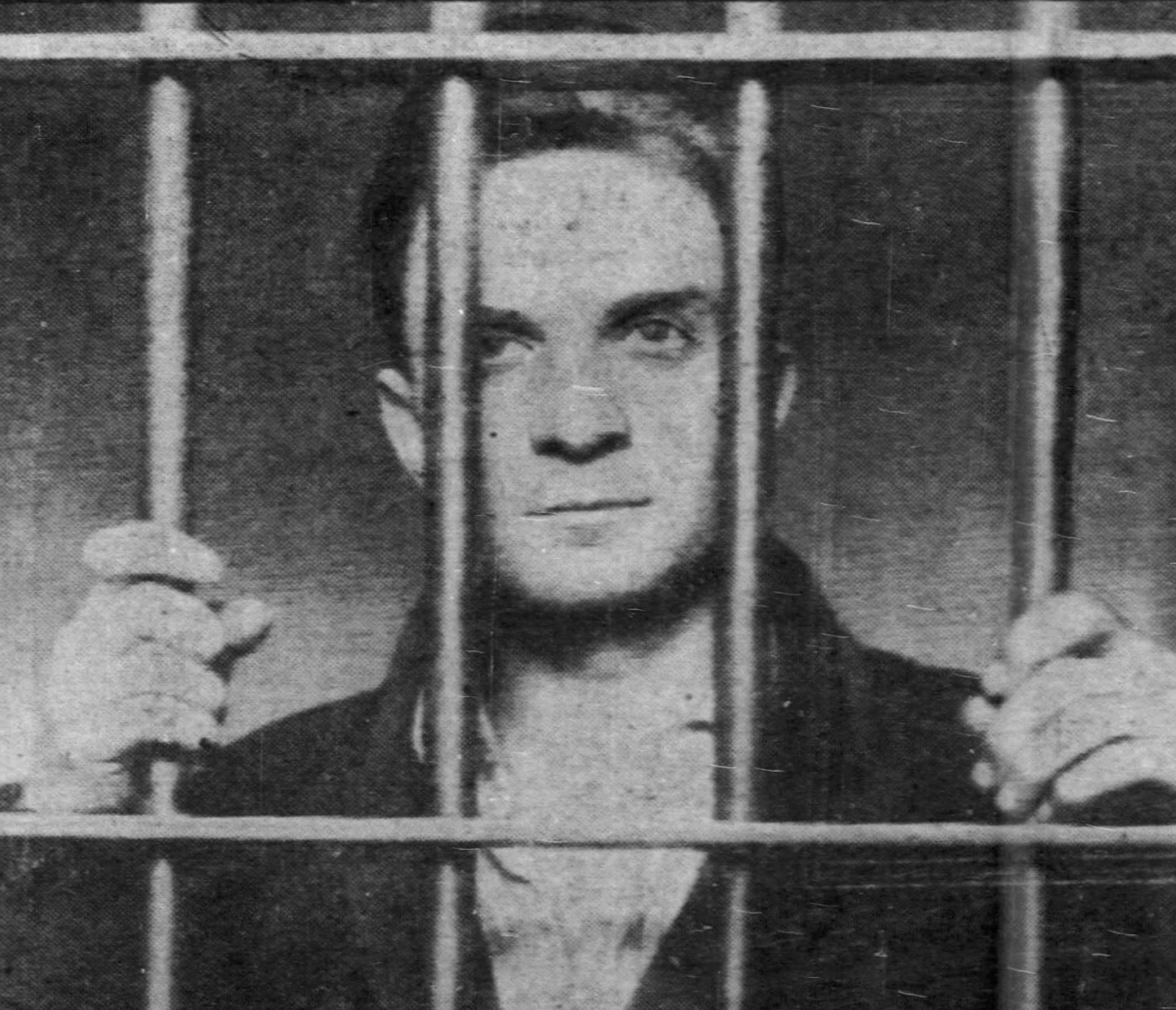
- Kudzinowski on death row c. 1928
- Born: August 13, 1903; Dickson City, Pennsylvania, U.S.
- Died: December 21, 1929 (aged 26); Trenton State Prison, New Jersey, U.S.
- Other names: Ray Rogers; Roy Lambert
- Status: Executed by electrocution
- Conviction: First degree murder
- Penalty: Death

Details
- Victims: 3–4+
- Span of crimes: March 8, 1924 – November 17, 1928
- Country: United States
- States: New Jersey; New York (state)
- Date apprehended: December 3, 1928
- Imprisoned at: Trenton State Prison

Peter Kudzinowski (August 13, 1903 – December 21, 1929) was an American serial killer who was linked to at least three murders committed within a four-year span.

An alcoholic, he confessed to his crimes while jailed for public intoxication in order to lift the burden of his conscience, stating he committed his murders in an equal state of intoxication. He was sentenced to death by the state of New Jersey after a quick legal process and spent a year on death row before he was executed in the electric chair at Trenton State Prison.

His crimes coincided with those of fellow serial killer Albert Fish, who also committed at least three murders (and was suspected of more) within the same time and area.

== Early life ==
Peter Kudzinowski was born on August 13, 1903, in Dickson City, Pennsylvania, to Polish immigrant parents Paul and Veronica. He is frequently and incorrectly referred to as Polish-born. (Note: Kudzinowski's father, Paul, had immigrated in 1893. His mother, Veronica, did so between 1894 and 1897. Both were residents of Dickson City in 1900.: Census 1900: Recorded immigration year for Paul: 1893; Veronica: 1894. As Kudzenski.; Census 1910: Recorded immigration year for Paul: 1893; Veronica: 1895. As Kojonski.; Census 1920: Recorded immigration year for Paul: 1893; Veronica: 1897. As Kudsinowski.; Census 1930: Recorded immigration year for Paul: deceased; Veronica: 1895. As Kutzinowski.) He was the youngest of four boys and grew up in the Scranton area.

Kudzinowski suffered a skull fracture in the sixth grade after diving into a shallow pool. This had a noticeable effect on his behavior; he refused to go to school anymore. He subsequently worked a stint in the Lackawanna Coal Mine and later held a job in the Lackawanna Railroad yards in Secaucus.

== Murders ==
=== Harry Quinn ===
After Kudzinowski was jailed for seven-year-old Joseph Storelli's murder in 1928, he also confessed to two other murders. Kudzinowski murdered 20-year-old Harry Quinn in Scranton on March 8, 1924. The two were friends and were traveling to Spring Brook Township, where Quinn was looking to land a job with the Spring Brook Water Supply Company. Kudzinowski had introduced himself as "Ray Rogers" and "Roy Lambert" to some of Quinn's family members on what turned out to be the last day they would hear anything from Quinn.

After the two of them had an altercation over a bottle of whiskey, Kudzinowski crushed Quinn's head with a rock. Kudzinowski's older brother later recalled that Kudzinowski came to visit him, told him he had been in a scrape, and needed money to leave town, without mentioning what had actually happened. Not having heard from Quinn in a few years, his family members presumed he had abandoned them and had been looking to get in touch with him through newspaper advertisements.

=== Julia Mlodzianowski ===
Kudzinowski also admitted to murdering Julia Mlodzianowski, a five-year-old girl from Jersey City, who was at a school picnic at Lake Hopatcong on August 19, 1928, although after he was captured, he told reporters he "had doubts" that he had actually murdered her. He lured her away from her parents before strangling her to death and dismembering her body, which was then disposed of in the Delaware Water Gap.

=== Joseph Storelli ===
Kudzinowski met seven-year-old Joseph Storelli in a "half drunk" state late afternoon on November 17, 1928, on First Avenue in East Village, New York. Kudzinowski accosted two other children at the same location, but they ran away. Kudzinowski lured the boy away with the promise of a box of candy and a visit to a motion picture show. He then took him by the Port Authority Trans-Hudson train to Journal Square in Jersey City and finally walked him to the New Jersey Meadowlands near Secaucus. When Joseph tried to get away, Kudzinowski knocked him down and hit him several times. Worrying that the boy's cries would attract passing cars, Kudzinowski slashed his throat, covered the body with the boy's overcoat, and left him.

== Capture ==
Kudzinowski was jailed in Detroit for public intoxication. He confessed to Storelli's murder to his jailer, who laughed at him. Kudzinowski was released after sobering up. On December 3, 1928, Kudzinowski drunkenly staggered up to a police traffic booth and told the officer there that he was wanted by the police. Upon being asked whether he meant for murder, he replied "You'll find out." In jail again, Kudzinowski was interviewed by Detroit detectives who obtained the rough edges of his confession. He was primarily motivated to confess by the weight of his conscience, stating "I'm willing to pay the penalty, and the sooner it's over, the better. I had to confess. It was troubling me."

He was quickly transported to Jersey City to stand trial. The state brought in a medical expert, who characterized Kudzinowski as possessing a psychopathic personality. The defense brought its own experts who analyzed the X-rays made after the diving accident in his youth. He was found guilty of first-degree murder on January 17, 1929. When asked if he had anything to say before the sentence was passed, Kudzinowski remained silent. He was sentenced to die in the electric chair at Trenton State Prison in the week of February 24. Kudzinowski stated he was ready to die and felt he would probably commit more murders if he were ever set free again.

=== Execution ===
His father, Paul, had suffered a complete breakdown upon learning of his son's deeds, with his health reportedly declining very rapidly and "aging in years." Paul Kudzinowski died on June 23, while Kudzinowski was held on death row. He lost an appeal on October 14. A final appeal to Governor Morgan Foster Larson of New Jersey to have his death sentence commuted to life in prison on grounds of insanity was denied on December 17. Kudzinowski appeared unfazed by his conviction, but on the night of his execution by electric chair on December 21, he appeared nervous and was unable to repeat the prayers uttered by his priest immediately before death. He requested ice cream for his last meal and declined to make a final statement.

== Aftermath ==
Storelli's father later took his family back to Italy, leaving behind only Joseph's older brother, who ended up serving a year in prison and who was at one point arrested for robbing a high-stakes card game. He was eventually shot and killed by police during a routine inspection.

Kudzinowski was considered a suspect in the disappearance of Billy Gaffney, who vanished in 1927. Albert Fish would later claim to have murdered Gaffney. Kudzinowski and Fish committed their crimes in the same time span and geographic area, and both killed children. He was also a suspect in the murder of Irving Pickelny, who disappeared from Brooklyn in February 1927.

== See also ==
- List of serial killers in the United States
