= Riverfront State Prison =

Former prison in Camden, New Jersey

Coordinates: 39°57′13″N 75°07′39″W

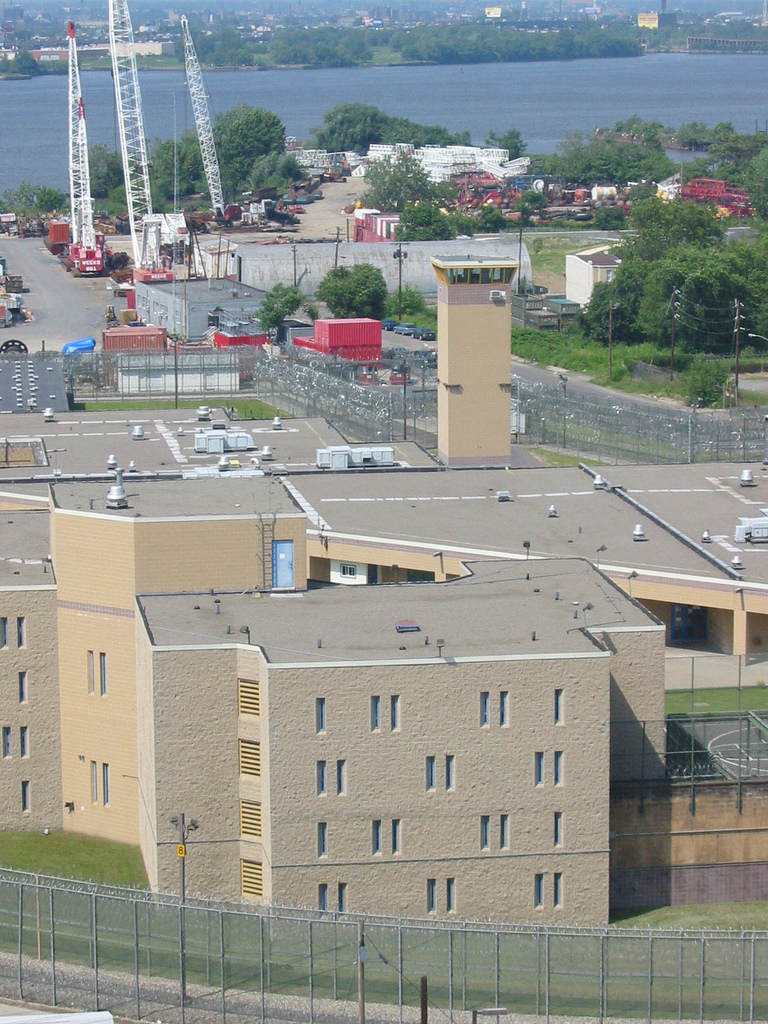
Riverfront State Prison

Riverfront State Prison (RSP) is a former prison in Camden, New Jersey, that was operated by the New Jersey Department of Corrections from August 12, 1985, to 2009. It was located in the neighborhood of Cooper Point at the intersection of Delaware Avenue and Elm Street.

The prison first opened after the state paid Camden money in exchange for receiving a plot of land that was used to establish the prison. It having been constructed at a cost of $31 million. The prison had a design capacity of 631 inmates, but housed 1,020 in 2007 and 1,017 in 2008.

In 2007, while the state was preparing to close Riverfront, it considered establishing a replacement state prison in Cumberland County, which already had three other state prisons. When officials from the city of Bridgeton, New Jersey, heard of a state report proposing to move Riverfront's prisoners to South Woods State Prison in Bridgeton, Bridgeton officials opposed the plans.

The last prisoners were transferred in June 2009 to other locations and the prison was closed. The state had a savings of $43 million per year. The 16-acre site is considered surplus property by the state. The buildings were demolished in 2009. In December 2012, the New Jersey Legislature approved the sale of the 16-acre (6.5 ha) site, considered surplus property, to the New Jersey Economic Development Authority.

In May 2013 the New Jersey Economic Development Authority announced that it would seek developers for the site. In September 2013 Waterfront Renaissance Associates announced that it proposed to build the Riverfront World Trade Center, a development of 2.3-million-square-foot campus on 16 acres (6.5 ha) on the site. The project would be built in four phases, the first of which would be a promenade along the Delaware River.

On September 2, 2024, the state made an aggressive proposal involving $800 million in public incentives to the Philadelphia 76ers to build a mixed-used stadium on the site. This immediately prompted condemnation from multiple groups opposed to using public funds to support for-profit sports franchises, along with calls for investigations to any possible connection to George Norcross, his family, and associates who are under federal indictment.
