= Anthony Balaam =

American serial killer

- Born: July 9, 1965 (age 61); Trenton, New Jersey, U.S.
- Other name: The Trenton Strangler
- Motive: Rage; Power
- Convictions: Murder (4 counts); Aggravated sexual assault (4 counts)
- Penalty: Life imprisonment (minimum of 120 years)

Details
- Victims: 4
- Span of crimes: 1994–1996
- Country: United States
- State: New Jersey
- Date apprehended: August 8, 1996
- Imprisoned at: New Jersey State Prison

Anthony Balaam (born July 9, 1965), known as The Trenton Strangler, is an American serial killer who raped and murdered four prostitutes between 1994 and 1996 in Trenton, New Jersey, luring them with sex-for-drugs encounters. Balaam was captured after his would-be fifth victim escaped, and he was later given a life sentence for his crimes.

== Early life ==
Balaam, a native of Trenton, lived at 421 Stuyvesant Avenue with a roommate at the time of the killings. Although a crack user, he had a ten-year relationship with a woman who bore him two children and was described as an unassuming, polite and soft-spoken young man. He did not interact much with his neighbors, and from July 1995 to January 1996, he moved temporarily to Detroit, before returning to Trenton. Before his capture, he was arrested on several occasions for drug offences and burglary.

== Murders ==
Balaam's modus operandi was to cruise around the streets, within two miles of his home, looking for potential victims. He would approach sex workers in the early hours of the day, offering them crack in exchange for sex, and when they moved to an isolated location, he pulled out a knife and threatened them before proceeding to rape and then strangle them. Three of the bodies were disposed of in vacant lots, while the last one was left in a rundown hotel. His would-be fifth victim had managed to escape after being raped on February 16, and at least one other woman had managed to flee unharmed.

The victims were as follows:

- Karen Denise Patterson (41) – October 24, 1994
- Valentina Cuyler (29) – March 19, 1995
- Connie Hayward (27) – April 10, 1995
- Debora Ann Walker (37) – July 29, 1996

== Arrest, trial and sentence ==
On the morning of July 29, 1996, Catherine Emerson, a neighbor of Balaam's, was contacted and informed to go look outside by another neighbor. Upon doing so, she found the body of a small-framed woman, lying on the grass at a nearby lot. The police were informed, quickly determining that the body belonged to Walker. Soon after, another body was found in the vicinity. Both of the women had been raped before death, and DNA testing on the semen pointed to Balaam.

He was swiftly arrested, but remained calm and collected, politely speaking to the detectives. Balaam admitted responsibility for the stranglings, describing about the rage and power he felt while slowly strangling the women. His guilt was confirmed by being identified by the woman who had evaded him.

Before bringing him to court, investigators contacted their colleagues in Detroit to determine whether Balaam might have committed murders there. A homicide investigator from the city denied that Balaam was a suspect in any unsolved cases in or around the area. With this cleared up, the trial began, charging him with the murders, in addition to robbery and possession of illegal weapons. After a four-week-long trial, Anthony Balaam was convicted and sentenced to life imprisonment, with a minimum of 120 years. He will not become eligible for parole until August 4, 2116.

== See also ==
- List of serial killers in the United States
