= Richard Biegenwald =

American serial killer

Richard Fran Biegenwald
- Biegenwald in a undated prison photograph
- Born: August 24, 1940; Staten Island, New York, U.S.
- Died: March 10, 2008 (aged 67); New Jersey State Prison, Trenton, New Jersey, U.S.
- Other name: The Thrill Killer
- Convictions: First degree murder; Murder (5 counts)
- Penalty: Death; overturned and re-sentenced to life imprisonment

Details
- Victims: 6 convicted, suspected of 8 total
- Span of crimes: December 18, 1958 – January 4, 1983
- Country: United States
- State: New Jersey
- Date apprehended: January 22, 1983

Richard Fran Biegenwald (August 24, 1940 – March 10, 2008) was an American serial killer and arsonist who murdered six people, four women and two men, in Monmouth County, New Jersey, between 1958 and 1983. He is suspected in at least two other murders.

== Early life ==
Born in Staten Island, New York, Biegenwald was frequently beaten as a child by his alcoholic father. At the age of five, Biegenwald set fire to their home and was sent for observation at a Rockland County Psychiatric Center.

By the age of eight, Biegenwald was drinking and gambling. At age nine he underwent electroshock therapy at New York's Bellevue Hospital. After his therapy, Biegenwald was placed in the State Training School for Boys in Warwick, New York. During his years there, Biegenwald was accused of theft and inciting other inmates to escape. During trips to visit his mother on Staten Island, he would steal money from her.

When he was 11, he set himself on fire in his mother's home. When Biegenwald was 16 years old, he graduated from the eighth grade and was released from the Training School to attend high school. Biegenwald dropped out of high school after only a few weeks.

Soon after dropping out of school, Biegenwald went to Nashville, Tennessee, where he stayed for two years. Biegenwald stole a car in Nashville, and was arrested in Kentucky by federal agents for transporting a stolen car across state lines. He returned to Staten Island in 1958.

== Murders ==
After his return, Biegenwald stole another car and went to Bayonne, New Jersey. There, on December 18, 1958, Biegenwald robbed a grocery store with accomplice Frank Spardoff, shooting and killing the proprietor, Stephen Sladowski, an attorney and prosecutor. Biegenwald fled the state after the murder, but was captured two days later in Salisbury, Maryland, after a shooting involving police. Biegenwald was extradited to New Jersey, where he was convicted of murder and given a life sentence. Biegenwald was released from prison on parole in 1975 after 17 years imprisonment.

Biegenwald worked odd jobs for three years and kept a low profile. In 1977, Biegenwald was suspected of a rape, and was wanted for failing to report to his parole officer. Biegenwald was arrested in Brooklyn in 1980 on the rape charge, but was released after the victim failed to pick him out of a lineup. Biegenwald got married, and he and his wife moved to Asbury Park, New Jersey. Biegenwald befriended Dherran Fitzgerald, who would play a role in several of his future murders.

Biegenwald struck again when he shot and killed 18-year-old Anna Olesiewicz in Ocean Township, New Jersey. Her body was found in January 1983 by children playing in a wooded lot behind a Burger King on Route 35 and Sunset Avenue, fully clothed with no signs of sexual assault and with four bullets in her head. He had found the young woman walking down the boardwalk in Asbury Park, and lured her into his car. A friend of Biegenwald's wife went to the police after Biegenwald showed her another young woman's body that he had hidden inside his Asbury Park home's garage.

Biegenwald was also suspected, but never charged, in two other killings. One involved the shooting death of John Petrone, an ex–convict and sometimes police informer, unearthed—minus his jawbone—on a remote New Jersey wildlife preserve. The other case involved Virginia Clayton, 17, abducted and killed on September 8, 1982. Her body was found three days later, four miles from the site where Petrone was buried.

=== Capture ===
Police surrounded Biegenwald's home on January 22, 1983, where Dherran Fitzgerald also lived. Police lured Biegenwald out of his house using a ruse and when he stepped off his back porch, he was grabbed by officers. Fitzgerald saw the commotion and hid himself in a secret room with several weapons. Detectives located the room and after threatening to shoot through the wall, he surrendered. A search of the home revealed a large cache of weapons and illegal drugs. Police confiscated several pipe bombs, handguns, rifles, shotguns, a machine gun, Rohypnol, chloral hydrate, marijuana, a live puff adder, venom collecting apparatus, and floor plans for several area notable residences and businesses.

During questioning, Fitzgerald told police of a third body, that of a young woman, that Biegenwald had shown him hidden in his garage. This victim was driven to the rear of Burger King in Ocean Township, and dumped in the wooded area behind. Fitzgerald told police that he helped Biegenwald transport another body to his mother's house in Staten Island and bury it in the basement. Fitzgerald went on to say that while he was digging in the basement, he exhumed a body that Biegenwald had buried there some time before. Fitzgerald led police to three other bodies in addition to the two buried in Staten Island.

As the investigation went on, police located a ninth victim, William Ward, who was buried in a shallow grave in Neptune City, New Jersey. Ward was a prison escapee whom Biegenwald had shot four or five times in the head and then disposed of at a cemetery nearby.

Police only had enough evidence to charge Biegenwald with five counts of first degree murder. Fitzgerald turned state's evidence.

== Death ==
Biegenwald died on March 10, 2008, at St. Francis Medical Center in Trenton, New Jersey, from a combination of both respiratory failure and kidney failure. His death was confirmed by Corrections Department spokeswoman Deirdre Fedkenheuer in an interview to the Associated Press.

== Victims ==
- Stephen Sladowski—Shot to death in 1958 after a robbery attempt in Bayonne, NJ.
- John P. Petrone—Police informant shot to death in June 1978 at an abandoned airport in Flemington, NJ.
- Maria Ciallella—Shot and dismembered on November 1, 1981. She was buried at Biegenwald's mother's house.
- Virginia Clayton—Abducted and murdered September 8, 1982, body found 3 days later 4 miles from location of where John Petrone's body was discovered.
- Deborah Osbourne—Stabbed to death on April 8, 1982. She was buried on top of Ciallella's body at Biegenwald's mother's house.
- Anna Olesiewicz—Shot four times in the head on August 28, 1982, after being lured away from the Asbury Park boardwalk. Her body was left behind a Burger King in Ocean Township, NJ.
- William Ward—Drug dealer and prison escapee shot 3 or 4 times in the head and killed by Biegenwald at his home in Asbury Park in September 1982.
- Betsy Bacon—Disappeared November 20, 1982.
- Sofia Marrone-- Disappeared March 16, 1978. Body discovered 6 days later and remained unidentified until November of 2026. Known as Montauk Mary while unidentified.

Of these murders, Biegenwald was convicted of murdering Sladowski, Ciallella, Osbourne, Olesiewicz, Ward & Bacon, three of whom he pleaded guilty to.

== See also ==
- List of serial killers in the United States
- List of serial killers by number of victims
