= Jerry Spraggins =

American murderer and suspected serial killer

- Born: Jerry Jerome Spraggins; December 17, 1954 (age 71); New Jersey, U.S.
- Convictions: Murder; Sexual assault Aggravated robbery
- Penalty: 40-years-to-life

Details
- Victims: 1–3
- Span of crimes: 1981–1983
- Country: United States
- State: New Jersey
- Date apprehended: For the final time on April 7, 1985
- Imprisoned at: New Jersey State Prison, Trenton, New Jersey

Jerry Jerome Spraggins (born December 17, 1954) is an American murderer, rapist, and suspected serial killer. Convicted and sentenced to 40 years to life in prison for the 1983 murder of a woman at an apartment in Montclair, New Jersey, he was also suspected, but ultimately acquitted of two similar murders that occurred in that same apartment from 1981 to 1983. Spraggins remains incarcerated for his single murder conviction.

== Early life and crimes ==
Jerry Jerome Spraggins was born on December 17, 1954, in New Jersey. Little is known about his early life, but he and his family moved to Montclair when he was ten years old. As an adult, he married, had a son and found employment as a taxi driver for the Claridge Taxi Company, in addition to working part-time as a mechanic.

While mostly considered a humble, ordinary man, Spraggins was also a Peeping Tom who frequently spied on naked women whenever he felt certain urges. Due to this, he was arrested and convicted on charges of voyeurism and marijuana possession in 1977, and in November 1980, he was arrested again on charges of criminal trespassing, criminal sexual contact and lewdness.

== Murders ==
In November 1981, 83-year-old Lillian Harris, an elderly woman who lived in an apartment in the Cranetown Apartments housing complex, was found dead. Her cause of death was initially believed to be the result of a heart attack, but some investigators cast doubt on this theory when they noticed some of the jewellery was missing. However, as there was no strong evidence suggesting foul play, the death was written off as natural.

On April 18, 1983, the decomposing body of 51-year-old Joan R. Leight was found in the same apartment. Initially, her death was also attributed to a heart attack, but it was later suggested that she had been asphyxiated and possibly sexually assaulted. Five months later, on September 2, the body of yet another woman, 68-year-old Sarah G. McHale, was found in the apartment. Unlike the previous victims, however, this time it was apparent that she was sexually assaulted, smothered with a pillow and ultimately strangled by her assailant. The similarities between her murder and the two previous deaths sparked renewed interest in the odd case, with some suggesting that all three had fallen victims to a serial killer.

== Arrest, trial and imprisonment ==
On December 16, 1984, Spraggins was arrested for breaking into a different apartment complex, for which he was charged with trespassing and attempted sexual assault. Due to the similarity of this act and the murders at Cranetown Apartments, investigators started delving into his past and uncovered his criminal record. With this, they were able to confirm that a fingerprint left on one of the window screens matched those of Spraggins. On April 7, 1985, when he learned that the police were searching for him, Spraggins voluntarily went to the police station to see what was going on, where he was immediately booked and charged with the murders of Leight and McHale.

While awaiting trial, Spraggins initially refused to do any interviews but finally agreed to give one to the Herald News in August 1985, claiming that he wanted to show the public that he was not the monster the media portrayed him as. In said interview, Spraggins was frank about his past convictions but claimed innocence in the murders, saying that when he was freed he would move away. He also advised young people to find some meaning in their lives and not get into trouble.

At his trial, however, Spraggins admitted responsibility for all three crimes, saying that he had a "problem about looking in windows" and wanted to get it off his chest. In his admissions, he admitted to sexually assaulting both Leight and McHale, but claimed that he thought both of them had fallen into unconsciousness and would simply wake up later. When it came to Harris, he gave a much briefer statement in which he admitted that some jewellery found in his room by his father and sister not long after the woman's death were indeed hers. His lawyer contested the motion that the confessions should be entered as evidence, claiming that the police had obtained them against his client's will and under duress.

Spraggins was eventually found guilty solely on the McHale murder charge, and was acquitted of all other charges related to Harris and Leight's deaths. During sentencing, the prosecution sought the death penalty, claiming that Spraggins' crime was enough to warrant it, while his lawyer argued that his client was mentally ill and therefore ineligible for such a sentence.

In the end, he was sentenced to a total of 40-years-to-life for the murder and sexual battery charges, and as of April 2025, Spraggins continues to serve his sentence at the New Jersey State Prison.
