= South Woods State Prison =

State prison in Bridgeton, New Jersey, US

Coordinates: 39.4131°N 75.2076°W

- Interactive map of South Woods State Prison
- Location: Bridgeton, New Jersey
- Status: Open
- Security class: medium & maximum
- Capacity: 3327
- Opened: 1997
- Managed by: New Jersey Department of Corrections

South Woods State Prison is a state prison for male offenders located in Bridgeton, Cumberland County, New Jersey, United States. It is operated by the New Jersey Department of Corrections.

== History ==
In the 1990s state officials planned to open a new prison in southern New Jersey. Officials planned to select one of several proposed sites in Camden County, Cumberland County, and Gloucester County. State officials narrowed the proposed sites to Bridgeton and Millville in Cumberland County. In 1992 officials said that they selected Bridgeton over Millville as the site for the proposed prison.

South Woods State Prison opened in 1997 and is the newest, as well as the largest, prison in New Jersey. When officials from the City of Bridgeton heard of a state report proposing to move over 1,000 prisoners from Riverfront State Prison in Camden to South Woods, Bridgeton officials opposed the plans.

There were 3,363 inmates of various custodial levels as of 2010.

As of 2025 the population is 3,118.

== Facilities ==
The Bureau of State Use Industry operates footwear, clothing, printing/graphics, signs and decals/binders shops at the facility.

== Notable Inmates ==
Inmate Name	Register Number	Status	Details
Richard Cottingham	000378516A	Serving 3 life sentences plus 117.5 years.	Serial Killer who was convicted in the early 1980's of 5 murders that happened between 1977-1980. In 2022, Cottingham has confessed to numerous other murders.
Nathaniel Harvey		. Died in prison in 2020	Was convicted of raping and murdering a woman in Plainsboro Township and sentenced to death; his death sentence was overturned after Governor Jon Corzine abolished the death penalty in 2007. Posthumously linked to another murder after his death.

== See also ==
- List of New Jersey state prisons
- List of law enforcement agencies in New Jersey
- List of United States state correction agencies
- Prison
