= Mid-State Correctional Facility (New Jersey) =

Prison in New Hanover Township, New Jersey

Coordinates: 39°59′51″N 74°35′02″W

- Interactive map of Mid-State Correctional Facility
- Location: Wrightstown, New Jersey (at Fort Dix)
- Status: Operational
- Security class: Drug treatment
- Capacity: 696
- Opened: 1982; 44 years ago
- Managed by: New Jersey Department of Corrections

Mid-State Correctional Facility is a New Jersey Department of Corrections state prison for juvenile offenders, located in Wrightstown, New Jersey on the grounds of Fort Dix. The facility opened in 1982. In April 2014, the prison was "closed for renovation".

Mid-State was scheduled to re-open in January 2017 as a specialized licensed drug treatment and detention center, with a capacity of 696. In April 2017, the facility re-opened. The facility now serves as a "treatment prison" for inmates, who can enroll in treatment programs that are state-certified.
