= Benjamin Cooper House =

Historic building in New Jersey

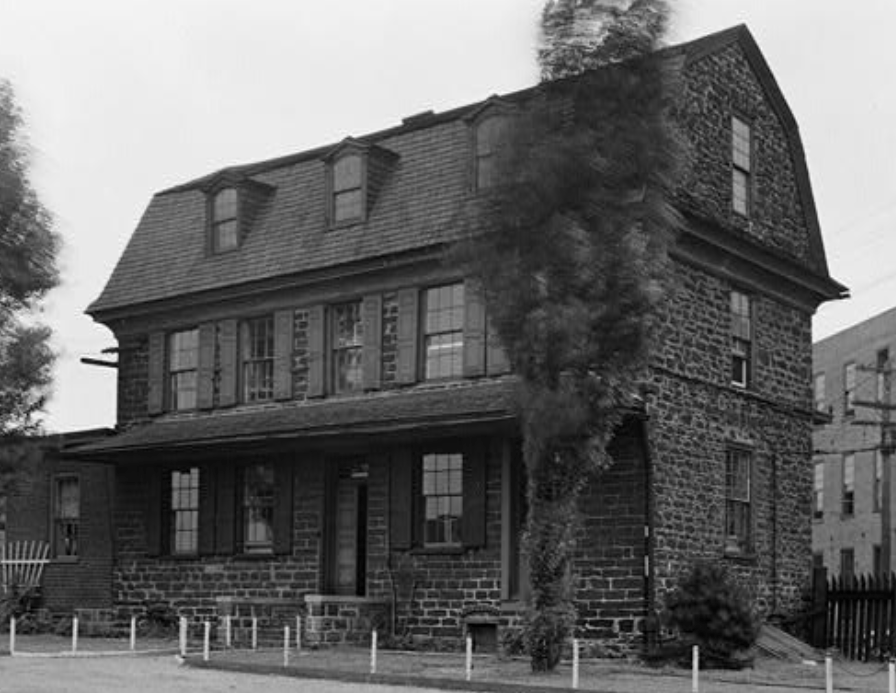

The Benjamin Cooper House is an 18th-century farmhouse and ferry house in Camden, New Jersey, in the United States. It is located at Erie Street in the Pyne Point neighborhood in North Camden. It was originally built in 1734 and served as a ferry stop as well as a residence. It later became a hotel and an entertainment venue. The building suffered extensive damage in a fire on Thanksgiving Day 2012.

The Benjamin Cooper House was built as a two-story Dutch colonial home with an addition made later in the late 18th century. The main part of the house is built from stone and the subsequent addition of brick. During the occupation of Philadelphia by the British and Hessian forces in the American Revolutionary War, it served as a headquarters for British Lt. Colonel Abercromby. In the early 19th century, it served as a pleasure garden and was open in the springs and summers to the public. It served as the last ferry tavern in Camden and as a saloon in its later years, known as the Old Stone Jug. Toward the end of the 19th century it was purchased by the John H. Mathis Company.

== See also ==
- Joseph Cooper House
- Pomona Hall
- National Register of Historic Places listings in Camden County, New Jersey
- List of the oldest buildings in New Jersey
