= Jerome Dennis (serial killer) =

American serial killer

- Mugshot
- Born: December 14, 1966 (age 59); Newark, New Jersey, U.S.
- Convictions: Murder (5 counts); Aggravated sexual assault (2 counts); False imprisonment (2 counts); Aggravated assault (1 count); Armed robbery (1 count); Parole violation (1 count)
- Penalty: Life imprisonment (minimum of 60 years)

Details
- Victims: 5
- Span of crimes: 1991–1992
- Country: United States
- State: New Jersey
- Date apprehended: April 13, 1992
- Imprisoned at: New Jersey State Prison

Jerome Dennis (born December 14, 1966) is an American serial killer who kidnapped and murdered four women and a teenage girl in Essex County, New Jersey, from 1991 to 1992. At the time of the murders, he was on parole for a prior rape conviction. After his arrest, Dennis pleaded guilty and was later sentenced to life imprisonment in 1993.

== Early life ==
Dennis was born on December 14, 1966, the seventh in a family of nine children, and raised in the Columbus Homes in Newark. Raised primarily by his mother, Dennis grew up in the grip of law enforcement, starting at age 11, but was never charged with any crime because of his young age. He dropped out of school in the seventh grade, afterwards he escalated from minor theft to rape.

On November 6, 1981, Jerome, 14, along with his brother William, committed a rape in downtown Newark. After the attack both brothers traveled to Military Park and stopped at a payphone to report the attack, along with giving up their identity and were subsequently arrested by police, by which time the phone call had lasted almost an hour.

After their initial arrest, Jerome and William confessed to having committed another two rapes the month before in October. The boys were charged as adults and stood trial together, in which their father testified on part of the prosecution. Jerome, then 14, was convicted in December 1981 for rape, false imprisonment and armed robbery, and was sentenced to 30 years in prison, with the minimum release possibility being after 10 years.

== Murders ==
Dennis took up baking while incarcerated, and attended vocational cooking classes and a Bible study group. In early October 1991, Jerome, who had served 10 years of his 30-year prison sentence, was granted early release, and on November 19, he was paroled. Soon after he moved into a home in East Orange, and was hired at Pleasantdale Bakery in West Orange, New Jersey as a porter.

Within two months of his release, on December 12, Dennis attacked 26-year-old Zelda Bailey, but she was not seriously injured and survived. Four days later, Dennis attacked 41-year-old Robyn Carter in Newark, raping, and strangling Carter to death. Her body was discovered the same day. Two months later on February 15, 1992, Dennis abducted 30-year-old Elizabeth Clenor, who was returning from a McDonald's where she had applied for a job. Dennis raped and bludgeoned her to death before disposing her body in an abandoned house.

Six days later, on February 21, Dennis attacked 30-year-old Stephanie Alston, and fatally stabbed her to death, then dumped her body approximately 50 yards from Clenor's body. The next day, on February 22, Dennis was armed with a knife when he attacked 23-year-old Khydijah Harris, who survived. On April 10, 1992, Dennis killed 16-year-old Jamillah Jones. Jones was out with her friends, and when nighttime fell, she decided it was best to return home. At about six blocks away from her house, Dennis attacked Jones, raping and stabbing her to death, then throwing her body off a pedestrian overpass.

Between then and April 11, Jones' body was discovered along with the bodies of Clenor, Alston, and the youngest victim, 14-year-old Shakia Hedgespeth. They were found within blocks from one another along the Garden State Parkway but were proven to have been killed days apart.

== Investigation ==
Both the Newark Police Department and East Orange's became aware of Dennis' crimes, but did not know his identity yet. At the time, they falsely believed the serial killer had murdered seven women, whose bodies were found in rural areas around the New Jersey cities of Newark and East Orange, and two other women reported to have been assaulted at knifepoint by a man in the areas.

During the investigation, police in both cities announced to the public that an active serial killer investigation was underway. Female residents were advised not go anywhere unattended, and patrol cars were constantly driving around the cities. Soon enough, a moral panic grew among the citizens of both cities, and the Federal Bureau of Investigation (FBI) joined in to investigate. The reality of a serial killer stalking women in East Orange and Newark was something the cities had not been used to, and at the time, the case made headline news on multiple occasions.

The East Orange Police Department and the FBI formed a task force with input from surrounding law enforcement agencies to investigate the cases. Community meetings were held, and flyers were handed out all over city that gave advice to safety and self-defense. Investigators were made aware of Jerome Dennis, a 25-year-old bakery worker with a juvenile record that included rape. After some time, Jerome's blood, hair and saliva samples were sent in for examination by investigators involved in the taskforce. Next, detectives put up a photo line-up and showed it to the two surviving victims, both identified Jerome with little question.

== Arrest ==
On April 13, 1992, Dennis was arrested and charged with 35 felonies, including rape, robbery, assault, kidnapping, one count of manslaughter, and four counts of murder. He was held at $2,000,000 bail. After the arrest, Newark officials held a public meeting, in which over 250 people showed to ask questions. While the arrest was a relief to investigators, the public were skeptical of Dennis' arrest, the main reason being they believed that the arrest was made to ease their fears.

Dennis himself pleaded innocent to the charges, however, after some time, he made a full confession to all the murders. One of Dennis' lawyers stated that his client suffered from schizophrenia, and requested a psychiatric test on Dennis.

== Convictions ==
On February 27, 1993, Dennis pleaded guilty to 13 charges; five counts of murder in the deaths of Carter, Clenor, Alston, Jones, and Hedgespeth, two counts of aggravated sexual assault, one count of aggravated assault, one count of armed robbery, two counts of criminal restraint, and one count of parole violation. Due to the plea other lesser charges were dropped. The plea agreement also allowed him to avoid a possible death sentence. Dennis received two consecutive and three concurrent life terms, with parole eligibility after 60 years. Dennis currently resides in New Jersey State Prison, and will become eligible for parole on April 10, 2052, when he is 85 years old.

== See also ==
- List of serial killers in the United States

== Bibliography ==
- Robert Keller (July 8, 2016). 50 American Serial Killers You've Probably Never Heard Of: Volume 5. CreateSpace Independent Publishing Platform. ISBN 978-1535138468.
