= Albert C. Wagner Youth Correctional Facility =

Prison in New Jersey, United States

Coordinates: 40.16°N 74.67°W

- Interactive map of Albert C. Wagner Youth Correctional Facility
- Location: 500 Ward Avenue Chesterfield Township, New Jersey
- Status: Closed
- Security class: Youth / treatment
- Capacity: 1235
- Opened: 1934
- Closed: January 3, 2020
- Managed by: New Jersey Department of Corrections

The Albert C. Wagner Youth Correctional Facility was a detention facility, located on Ward Avenue in Chesterfield Township, New Jersey, United States. It is named for state corrections official Albert C. Wagner.

== History ==
First opened in 1934, the mixed-security facility is owned and was operated by the New Jersey Department of Corrections. The facility housed violent young offenders, as well as those incarcerated on narcotics charges. As of August 7, 2009, the prison had an inmate population of 1,235.

The facility emphasized vocational, academic and social programs as well as individual and group therapy, substance abuse treatment and psychiatric treatment. The Bureau of State Industries operated a metal fabrication shop at the facility.
