= Joseph Cooper House =

Historic house in New Jersey, United States

- U.S. National Register of Historic Places
- New Jersey Register of Historic Places
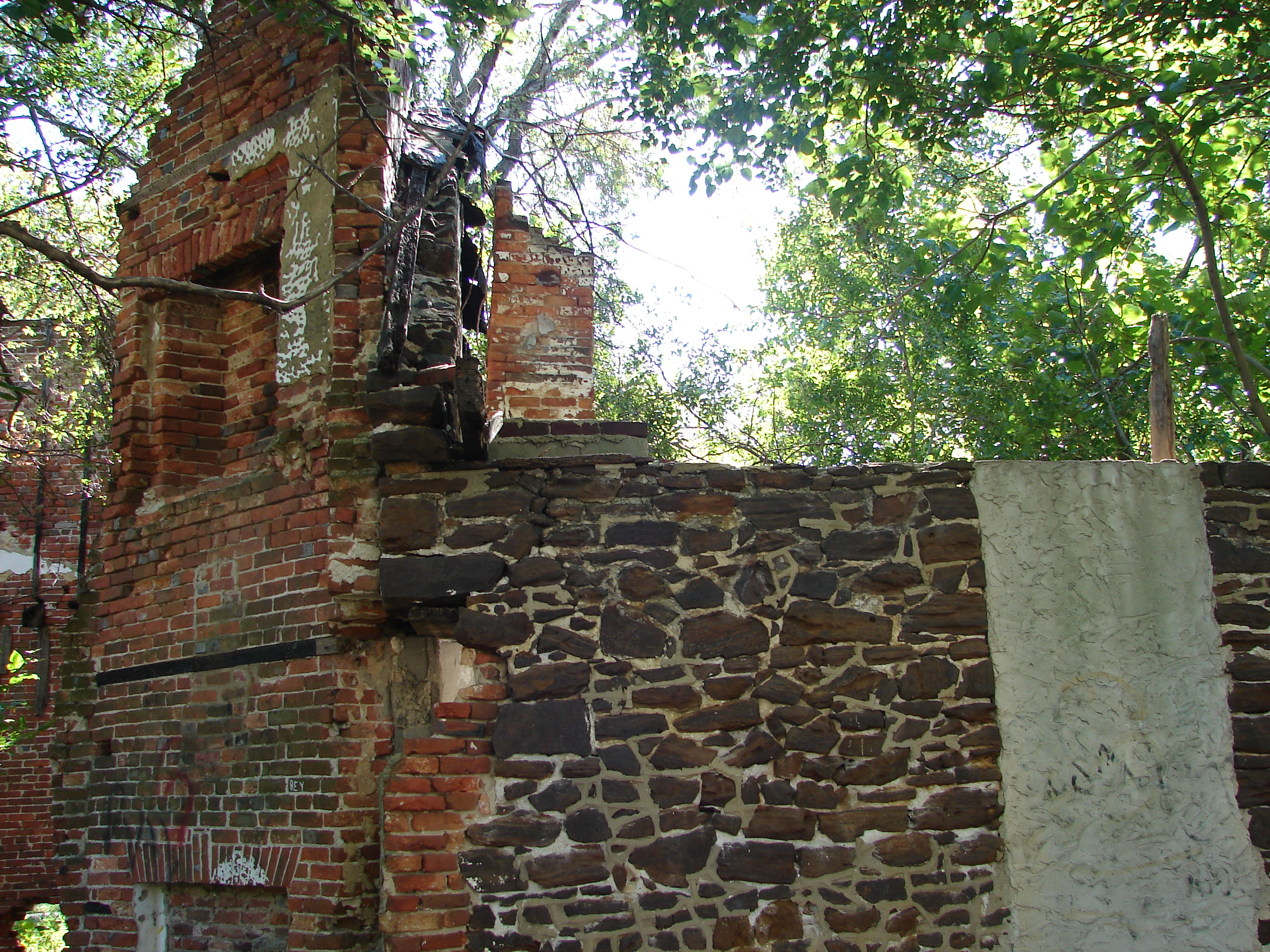

- Location within Camden County, New Jersey Location within New Jersey Location within the United States
- Location: Head of 7th Street in Pyne Point Park, Camden, New Jersey
- Coordinates: 39°57′16″N 75°6′57″W
- Built: ca. 1695
- NRHP reference No.: 73001086
- NJRHP No.: 900

Significant dates
- Added to NRHP: March 14, 1973
- Designated NJRHP: August 7, 1972

Joseph Cooper House is located in Camden, Camden County, New Jersey, United States. The house was built in 1695 and added to the National Register of Historic Places on March 14, 1973, for its significance in architecture. A fire, about 2005, destroyed the roof. The ruins of the building are planned to become a pavilion in the surrounding park.

== History and description ==
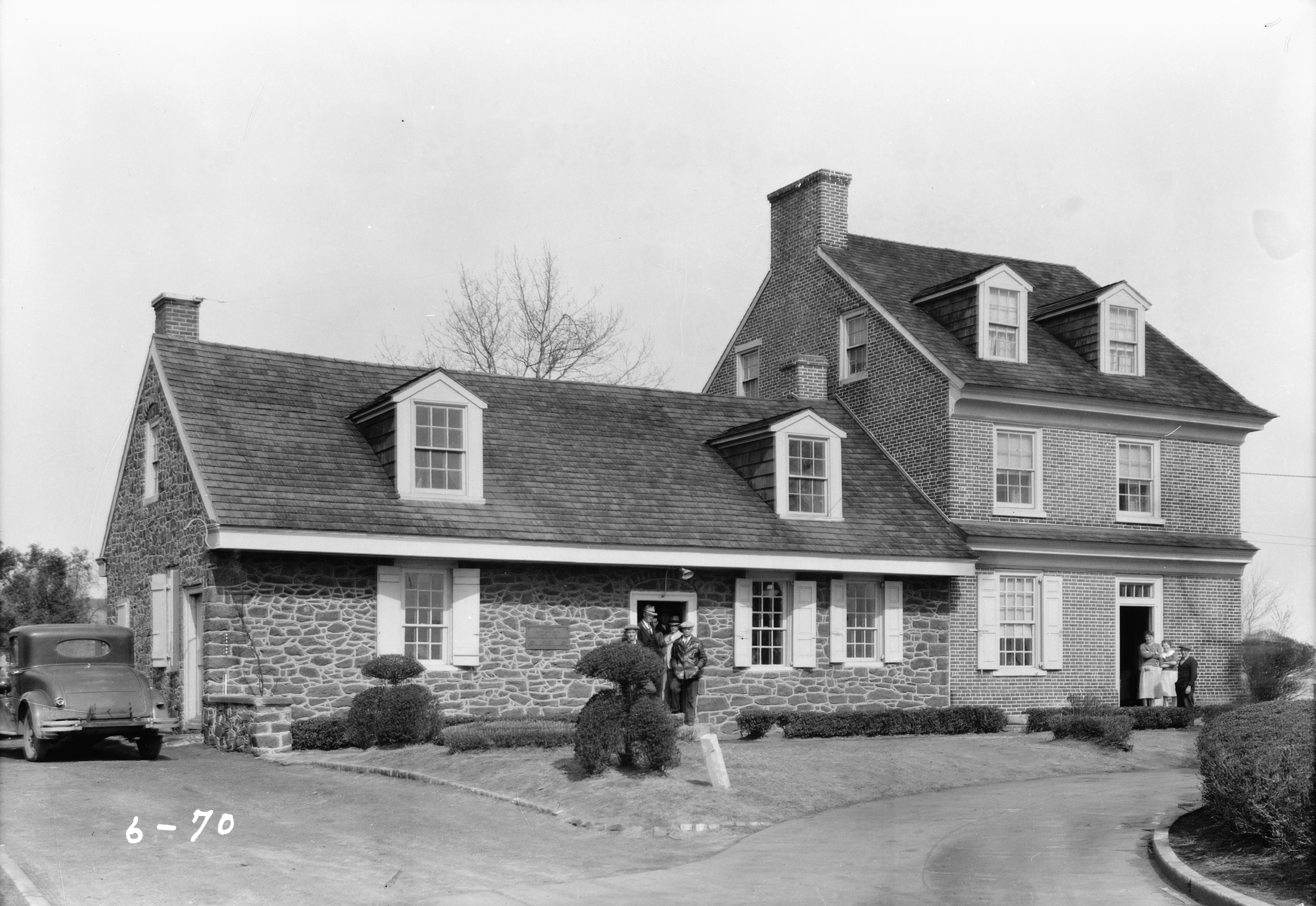
HABS photo from 1936

The Cooper family were involved in operating ferries along the Delaware River, including from slip nearby.

Joseph Cooper House is a historic site located in Pyne Point Park on 7th and Erie street in Camden. It was built by William Cooper and Joseph Cooper in 1695, this makes it the oldest structure in the city of Camden. The ten room manor was built in sections, the first in Dutch colonial style in the late 17th century was constructed from ironstone. The second part a two-story addition was built using brick imported from England in the early 18th century. The Joseph Cooper house and Pyne point park where originally owned by the Cooper family and were both purchased by the city in 1913. Before being severely damaged by a fire in 2005, it served as a library and meeting house. In 2012 the city granted control of the house to the Cooper Ferry Partnership. They enlisted Jibe Design to develop an adaptive reuse plan in 2013; their plan was later approved by the Cooper Ferry Partnership. As of today, Cooper Ferry Partnership is seeking funds for the refurbishing of the building.

== See also ==
- National Register of Historic Places listings in Camden County, New Jersey
- List of the oldest buildings in New Jersey
- Pomona Hall
- Benjamin Cooper House
