= New Jersey Department of Corrections =

New Jersey state prison agency

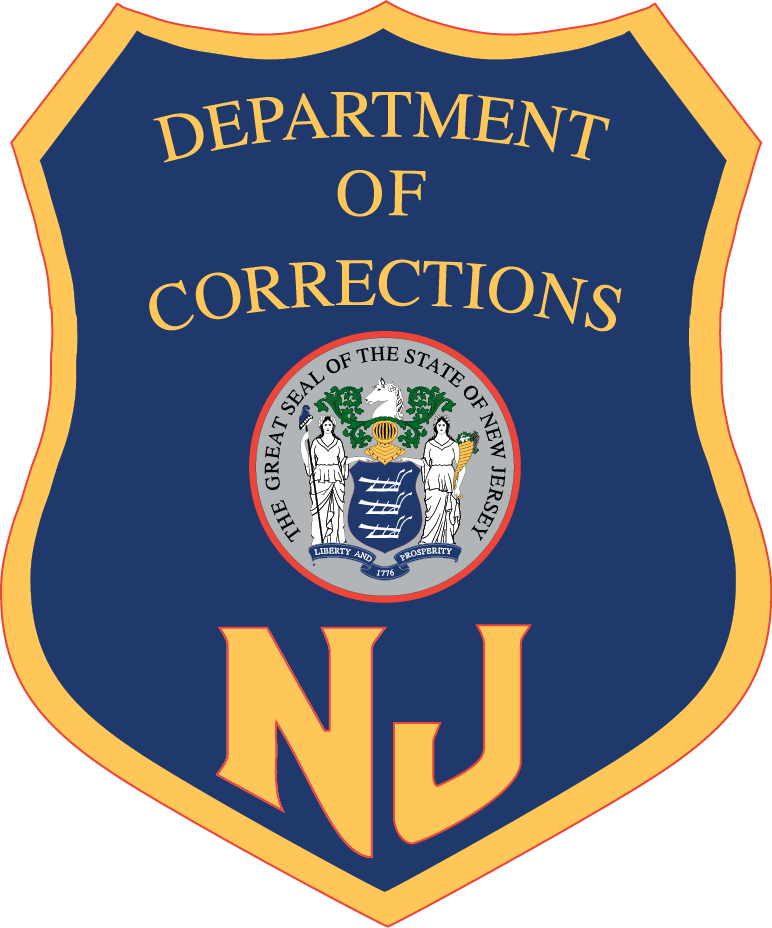
- Seal of the NJDOC

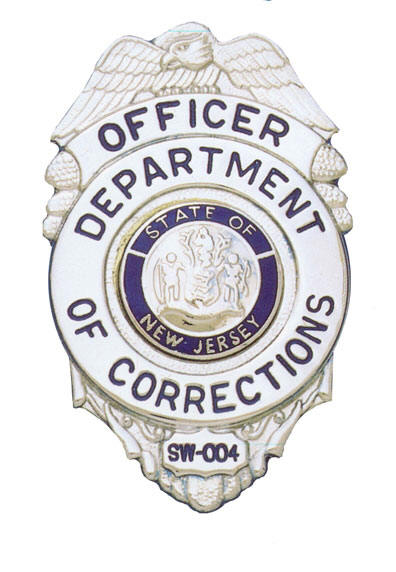
- Badge of the NJDOC
- Abbreviation: NJDOC
- Motto: Dedication, Honor, Integrity

Agency overview
- Formed: November 1, 1976; 50 years ago
- Preceding agency: Department of Institutions and Agencies
- Employees: 24,000
- Volunteers: 1,500
- Annual budget: US$1.3 billion (FY2027)

Jurisdictional structure
- Operations jurisdiction: New Jersey, United States
- Map of New Jersey Department of Corrections's jurisdiction
- Area: 8,729 square miles (22,610 km^{2})
- Population: 8.899 million (2013)
- Legal jurisdiction: State of New Jersey
- Governing body: Government of New Jersey
- General nature: Civilian police

Operational structure
- Headquarters: Whittlesey Road; Trenton, New Jersey 08625
- Corrections Officers: 6,000
- Staff Members: 8,000
- Agency executive: Victoria L. Kuhn, Commissioner
- Child agencies: Office of the Chief of Staff; Division of Programs and Community Services; Office of the Deputy Commissioner
- Units: Interfacility: Drug Interdiction Unit; Intelligence Unit; Fugitive Unit; Computer Forensic and Polygraph Unit; Internal Affairs Unit; Fleet Management Unit; Custody Recruitment Unit (CRU); Prison Rape Elimination Act (PREA) Compliance Unit; Administrative Policies and Procedures Manual (APPM) Unit; Central Medical Unit; Health Services Unit
- Offices: Public: Office of Legal Affairs & Regulatory Affairs; Office of Employee Relations (OER); Office of the Corrections Ombudsman; Office of Public Information; Office of Human Resources; Office of Training; Office of Policy and Planning; Office of Financial Management; Office of Information Technology; Bureau of State Use Industries

Facilities
- Prisons: 13: Adult Diagnostic and Treatment Center; Albert C. Wagner Youth Correctional Facility; Bayside State Prison; Central Reception and Assignment Facility; East Jersey State Prison; Edna Mahan Correctional Facility for Women; Garden State Youth Correctional Facility; Mid-State Correctional Facility Annex; William H. Fauver Youth Correctional Facility; New Jersey State Prison; Northern State Prison; Southern State Correctional Facility; South Woods State Prison

Notables
- Anniversary: Correction Officer Day (or "Fred Baker's Law") (July 30)
- Award: The American Correctional Association conferred its first-ever "Innovations in Corrections Award" on Engaging the Family in the Recovery Process – An Innovative Approach for the Max-Out Offender

Website
- NJDOC

The New Jersey Department of Corrections (NJDOC) is the government agency responsible for operations and management of prison facilities in the U.S. state of New Jersey. The New Jersey Department of Corrections operates 9 correctional facilities, 11 Residential Community Release Programs, and 1 Assessment Center. The department is headquartered in Trenton.

The NJDOC's facilities house a combined total of 20,000 inmates in minimum, medium and maximum security levels. Approximately 1,200 inmates are incarcerated, and an equal number released each month. The median term for inmates is six years. 47% of inmates are serving terms of one-to-five years; 17% are serving terms of six-to-nine years; and 33% are serving maximum sentences of 10 years or more. As of January 2003, 984 offenders were serving life sentences, including 14 offenders under death sentences (all of which have now been commuted, as capital punishment was abolished in 2007).

== Jurisdiction and law enforcement authority ==
New Jersey State Correctional Police Officers, Parole Officers and Corrections Investigators are authorized to exercise police officer powers statewide. With this authority, Correctional Police Officers are required to enforce NJRS 2C (New Jersey Criminal Code) within the scope of their employment.

New Jersey State Correctional Police Officers are authorized to carry on duty the Smith & Wesson M&P in 9×19mm Parabellum. Correction Officers may optionally qualify to carry an authorized off-duty firearm. All off-duty firearms and ammunition must conform to the approved list provided by the New Jersey Department of Corrections.

Since the establishment of the New Jersey Department of Corrections, 24 officers have died in the line of duty.

== Ranks ==
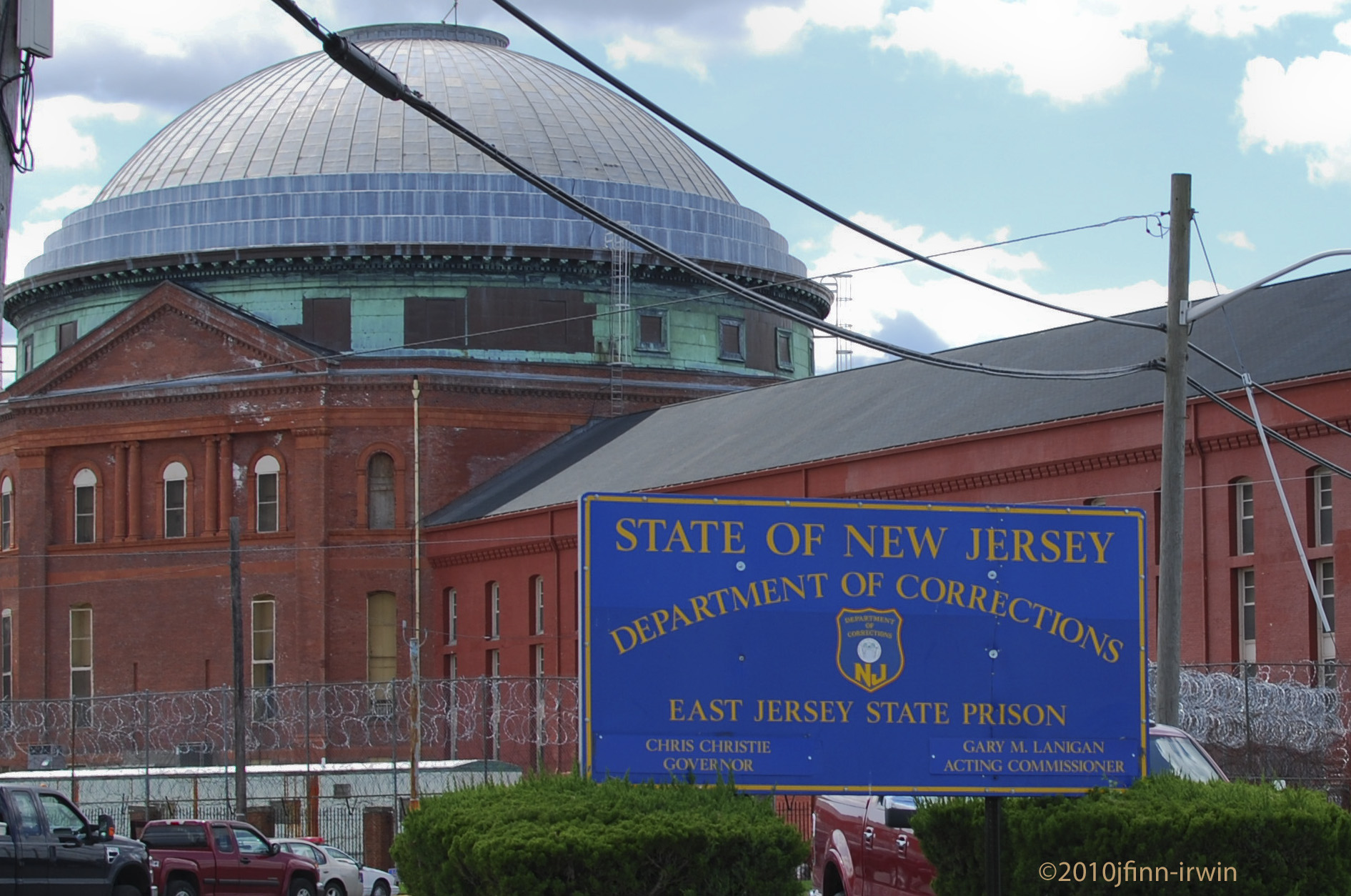
East Jersey State Prison

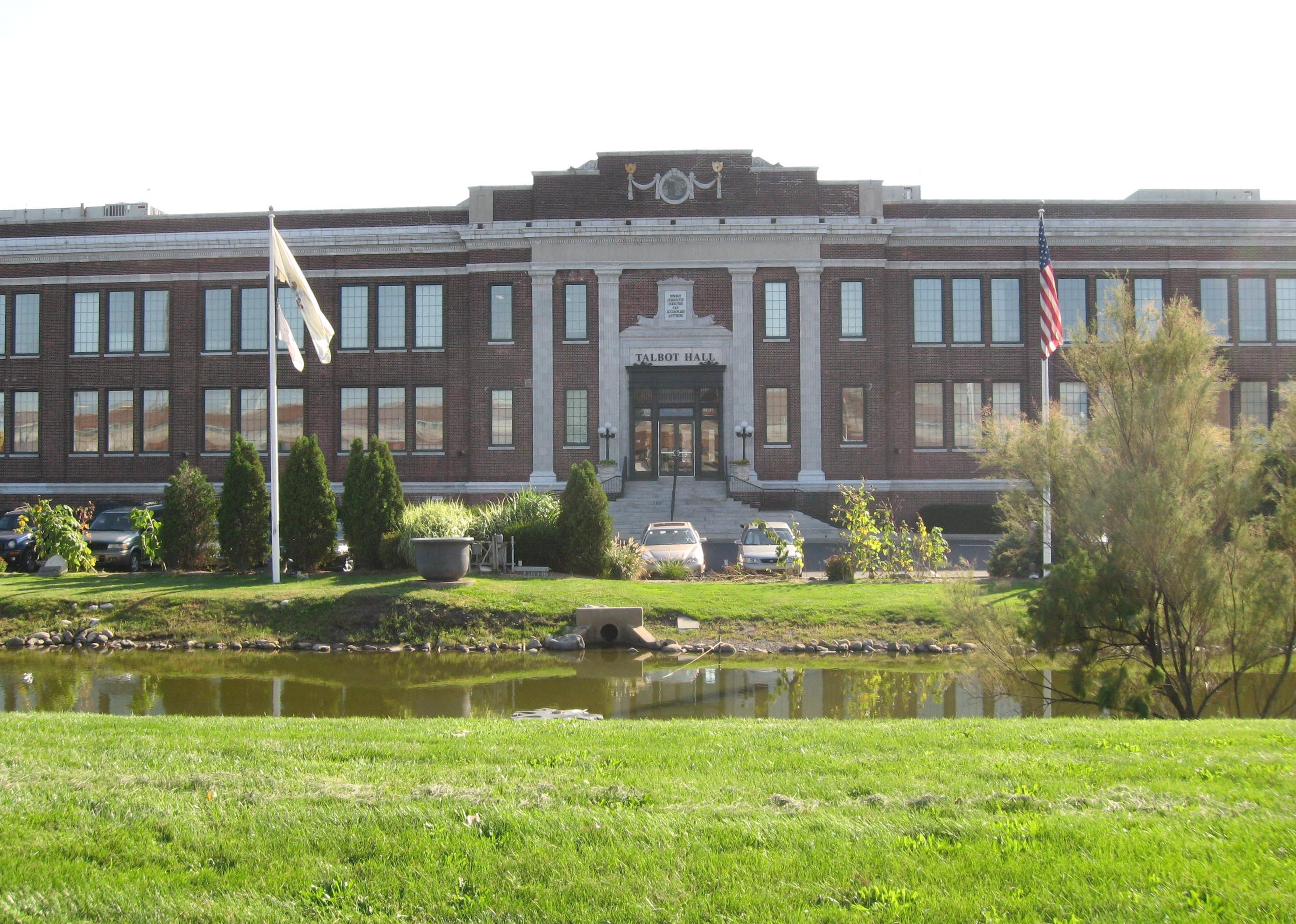
Talbot Hall

There are four sworn titles (referred to as ranks) in the New Jersey Department of Corrections:

Title	Insignia	Uniform Shirt Color
Major		French Blue
Lieutenant		French Blue
Sergeant		French Blue
Officer		French Blue

== Media campaigns ==
The New Jersey Department of Corrections established the "Be Smart Choose Freedom" television advertisement campaign in 2005. The State of New Jersey produced 30–60-second public service announcements to warn state residents against going to prison. The Mississippi Department of Corrections, the state corrections agency of Mississippi, decided to start its own "Be Smart Choose Freedom" campaign and use the commercials that aired in New Jersey. The NJDOC commercials were available in English, with one public service announcement also having a Spanish version.

== Facilities ==
=== Open ===
According to the state budget for fiscal year 2025, the Department of Corrections has capacity to house 15,590 inmates and anticipates a daily average population of 12,490 inmates. It has 5,018 employees for a personnel ratio of 1 person for every 2.6 inmates. The state legislature appropriated $866.2 million to the Department of Corrections in the fiscal year ending June 30, 2023, of which $562.5 million was used in salaries and wages.

Prison	Inmate Capacity	Average daily population	Annual per capita cost	Daily per capita cost
New Jersey State Prison	2,084	1,448	$84,863	$214.16
East Jersey State Prison	1,497	1,364	$57,634	$157.90
South Woods State Prison	3,512	3,432	$46,814	$128.26
Bayside State Prison	1,377	1,356	$60,074	$164.59
Mid-State Correctional Facility	710	506	$82,903	$227.13
Edna Mahan Correctional Facility for Women	885	393	$186,964	$512.23
Northern State Prison	2,747	2,083	$58,836	$161.20
Adult Diagnostic and Treatment Center	692	428	$122,785	$336.40
Garden State Youth Correctional Facility	2,086	1,375	$94,135	$257.92

=== Defunct ===
- Albert C. Wagner Youth Correctional Facility (Bordentown)
- Central Reception and Assignment Facility (Trenton)
- Riverfront State Prison (Camden)
- Southern State Correctional Facility (Delmont)
- William H. Fauver Youth Correctional Facility (Annandale)

== Death row ==
Prior to the 2007 repeal of the death penalty, the death row for men and the execution chamber were in the Capital Sentence Unit (CSU) at the New Jersey State Prison. This unit was first established in 1907. The first death by electrocution occurred on December 11, 1907. On December 17, 2007, Governor Jon Corzine signed a bill passed by the New Jersey General Assembly passed which abolishes the death penalty, making New Jersey the first state to legislatively eliminate capital punishment since 1965. The day prior to abolition, Governor Corzine commuted the death sentences of the remaining eight men on death row to "life imprisonment without parole".

== Related legislation ==
- 1976: Department of Corrections Act of 1976, P.L. 1976, c. 98
- 2001: Act of May 4, 2001, P.L. 2001, c. 79

== See also ==
- List of law enforcement agencies in New Jersey
- List of United States state correction agencies
