= List of current inmates at San Quentin Rehabilitation Center =

Notable prisoners

This page is a list of notable inmates currently serving time at San Quentin Rehabilitation Center (formerly San Quentin State Prison). As of July 2023, there are nearly 4000 convicts located at the institution.

While many prisoners here were sentenced to death, the State of California hasn't executed anyone since 2006, and a moratorium was enacted by Governor Gavin Newsom in 2019.

== Notable inmates ==
Inmate Name	Register Number	Details
Alejandro Avila	V88742	Perpetrator of the 2002 Murder of Samantha Runnion in which Avila kidnapped and raped the 5-year-old before killing her.
Richard Delmer Boyer	C98101	Convicted of the 1982 murder of elderly couple Eileen and Francis Harbitz.
Vincent Brothers	F90651	Convicted of killing his wife, mother-in-law, and three children in 2003.
Albert Greenwood Brown	C43700	Convicted of the 1980 rape and murder of Susan Jordan, and Brown was supposed to be executed in 2010, but was called off.
Luis Bracamontes	BG0828	Convicted of murdering two police officers in 2014.
Dean Carter	C97919	Convicted of murdering 4 people in 1984, and suspected of killing at least one other person.
Steven David Catlin	D32989	Convicted of poisoning his two wives and his adoptive mother.
Tiequon Cox	D29801	Crips member who was convicted of murdering 4 people that were related to NFL player Kermit Alexander.
Richard Allen Davis	D11903	Perpetrator of the 1993 Murder of Polly Klaas in which Davis kidnapped and killed the 12-year-old girl.
Jon Dunkle	D30423	Murdered three boys in the 1980s.
Robert Mark Edwards	P11700	Murdered two women.
Pedro Espinoza	AM7801	One of the perpetrators of the Murder of Jamiel Shaw II.
Wayne Adam Ford	F65748	Murdered 4 women.
Kevin Haley	D98501	Murdered two women in the 1980s.
Ivan Hill	F68281	Murdered 6 women.
Ryan Hoyt	T84529	One of the perpetrators of the Murder of Nicholas Markowitz.
Michael Hughes	P25039	Serial killer who murdered multiple people.
Anand Jon	AB1337	Fashion designer and serial rapist.
Randy Kraft	E38700	Convicted of 16 murders that were committed between 1971–1983, though Kraft's number of victims may be significally higher.
Gunner Lindberg	K79300	Convicted of a 1997 murder.
Franklin Lynch	H34201	Murdered 3 women.
Charles "Chase" Merritt	BL4162	Perpetrator of the McStay family murders.
Andrew Mickel	V77400	Murdered police officer David Mobilio.
Joseph Naso	AR9737	Murdered 4 people.
Gerald Parker	J10319	Murdered 6 people.
David Allen Raley	D86900	Murdered Jeanine Grinsell.
David Allen Rundle	E30826	Murdered 3 people.
Ramon Salcido	E79901	Murdered 7 people.
Wesley Shermantine	T18128	One of the Speed Freak Killers.
Chester Turner	J69942	Convicted of murdering multiple women.
Marcus Wesson	V88811	Convicted of murdering nine of his family members, all of which were related to Wesson through incest, as well rape and molestation charges.
