= Grim Sleeper =

American serial killer (1952–2020)

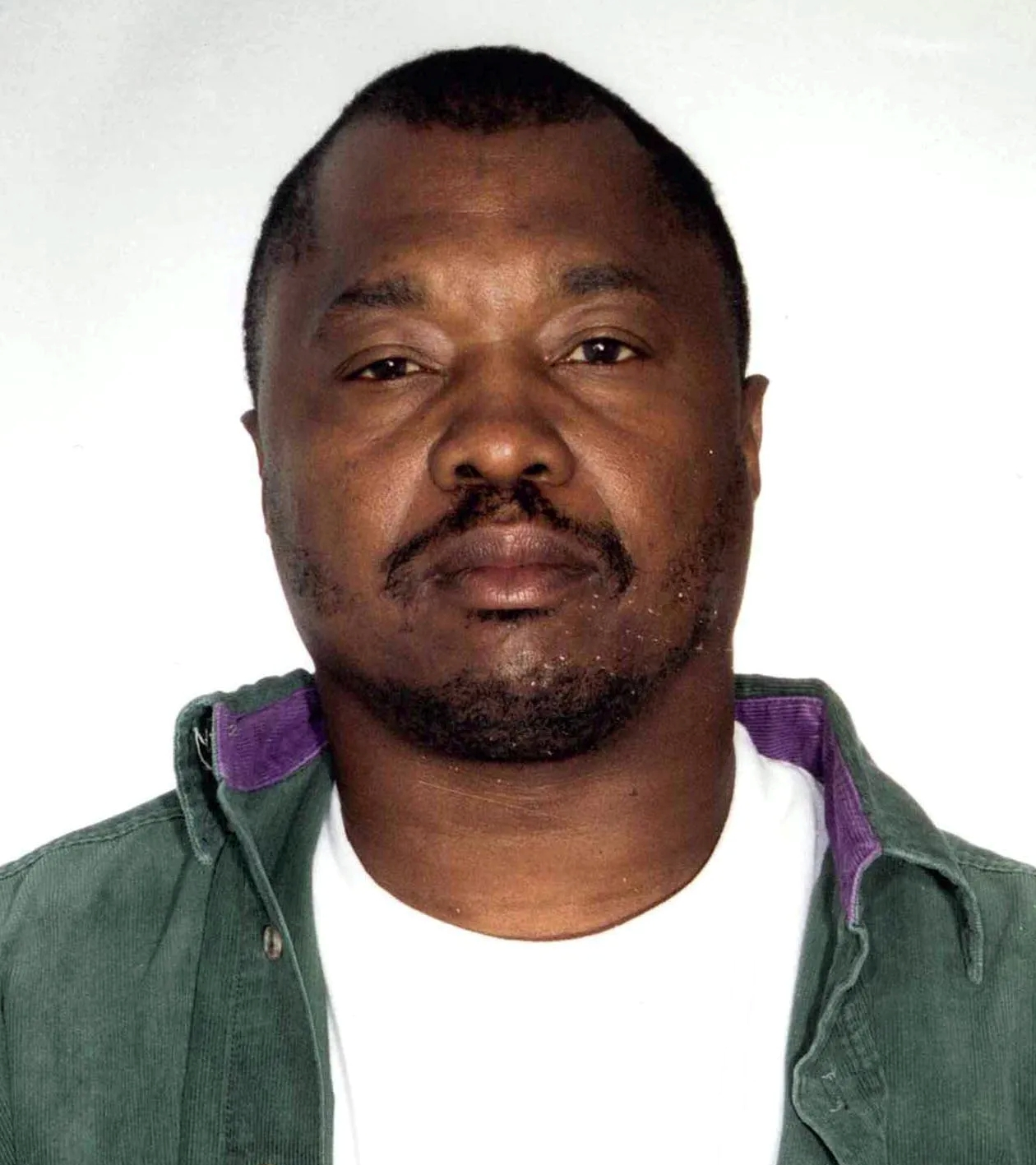
- Franklin in a 1998 mug shot
- Born: Lonnie David Franklin Jr. August 30, 1952; Los Angeles, California, U.S.
- Died: March 28, 2020 (aged 67); San Quentin State Prison, San Quentin, California, U.S.
- Other names: Grim Sleeper; 25 Auto Killer
- Children: 2
- Status: Deceased
- Convictions: First degree murder with special circumstances (10 counts); Attempted first degree murder; Forcible rape
- Penalty: Death

Details
- Victims: 10–25+ victims 2 known survivors
- Span of crimes: 1984–2007
- Country: United States
- State: California
- Date apprehended: July 7, 2010

Lonnie David Franklin Jr. (August 30, 1952 – March 28, 2020), better known by the nickname Grim Sleeper, was an American serial killer who was responsible for at least ten murders and one attempted murder in Los Angeles, California, from 1984 to 2007. He was also convicted for rape and sexual violence. Franklin earned his nickname when he appeared to have taken a 14-year break from his crimes, from 1988 to 2002.

In July 2010, Franklin was arrested as a suspect, and, after many delays, his trial began in February 2016. On May 5, 2016, the jury convicted him of killing nine women and one teenage girl. On June 6, 2016, the jury returned a verdict of guilty, and on August 10, 2016, the Los Angeles Superior Court sentenced him to death for each of the ten victims named in the verdict.

On March 28, 2020, Franklin was found dead in his cell at San Quentin State Prison. No cause of death was ever publicly revealed.

== Early life ==
Lonnie David Franklin Jr. was born on August 30, 1952, and grew up in South Central Los Angeles. He married and had two children, and served in the United States Army. He was given a dishonorable discharge in July 1975, after being released from prison for his conviction for kidnapping and gang rape in Stuttgart, West Germany, in April 1974.

=== First known kidnapping and assaults ===
While stationed in Stuttgart, Franklin, along with two other servicemen who had tried to kidnap another woman earlier that night, stopped a 17-year-old girl to ask directions, and offered her a ride home. When she accepted, they put a knife to her throat, drove to a field, and spent the rest of the night raping her. During the gang rape, photographs were taken by the rapists — as Franklin would later also do with the women he raped and murdered. The victim was able to feign interest in Franklin and asked for his phone number, by which police identified him. A West German court sentenced Franklin to three years and four months in prison. The victim would later testify at the sentencing phase of Franklin's 2016 capital murder trial.

In 1989, Franklin was convicted of two charges of theft, one charge of misdemeanor assault, and one charge of battery. He served time for only one of the theft charges.

== Investigation ==
=== Original 1980s investigation ===
In the mid-1980s, the Los Angeles Police Department (LAPD) became aware of an apparent serial killer targeting Black women who were chronic drug users and street sex workers. The killer, dubbed the "Southside Slayer," was believed to be responsible for stabbing and strangling at least 13 sex workers between 1983 and late-1985. At one point, the murders were colloquially known as the "Strawberry Murders" ("strawberry" being slang for a woman who exchanges sex for drugs).

In September 1985, the LAPD described the case at a press conference and asked for tips from the public. Following the press conference, the LAPD was heavily criticized for their failure to alert the South Central community to the possibility of a serial killer earlier. Activist Margaret Prescod and other community activists held weekly protests outside of the LAPD's headquarters in an effort to pressure the department into forming a task force to investigate the murders. Prescod contrasted the apparent lack of police interest in the South Central murders with the significant attention given to the investigation of Richard Ramirez, the serial killer dubbed the Night Stalker who targeted women in upscale areas of Los Angeles and San Francisco between June 1984 and August 1985. Prescod accused the LAPD of indifference to the deaths of women who were poor, Black, drug users, and sex workers, which the LAPD denied.

By January 1986, 15 murders had been linked to the case. More detectives were added to the joint LAPD-LASD investigation, which had become known as the Southside Slayer Task Force, but by 1986 the case was still under investigation. Prescod formalized her group of activists as a community group called the Black Coalition Fighting Back Serial Murders and in March 1986 pressured the Los Angeles City Council to increase the reward money they were offering for information on the killings from $10,000 to $25,000.

By late-1986, conflicting modus operandi and suspect descriptions caused the investigators to doubt their original theory of a single killer being responsible for all of the murders. Evidence suggested that several serial killers – possibly four or more – were murdering women in South Los Angeles. The Southside Slayer Task Force began downsizing in 1987 due to the lack of results relative to the expense and manpower being used. Task-force commander Lt. John Zorn told the Los Angeles Times in December 1987 that "the flow of clues is almost non-existent at this point."

=== Multiple serial killers ===
Over the following years, it was found that serial killer Louis Craine committed at least two of the so-called "Southside Slayer" murders, and serial killers Michael Hughes, Daniel Lee Siebert, Chester Turner, and Ivan Hill committed at least one each. In addition, some of the murders may have been committed individually by the women's pimps or clients, unrelated to any serial killer.

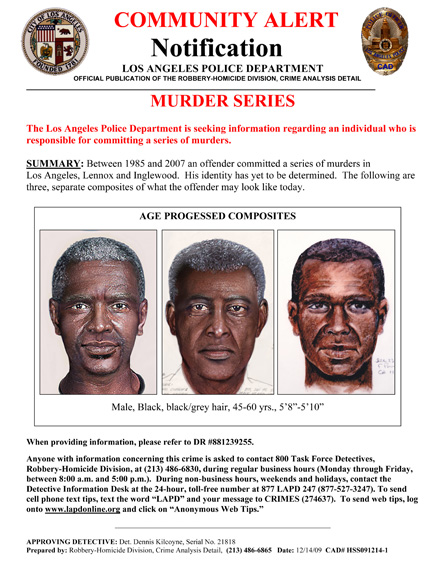
Notice released by the LAPD in 2009, featuring age-progressed composite sketches of the killer

The murders of Judith Simpson, Cynthia Walker, and Latanya Johnson, all committed with a 9 mm pistol in late 1988, were also investigated by the Southside Slayer Task Force. Sheriff's Detective Rickey Ross was arrested for the murders after being found with drugs and a sex worker in a vehicle that had a rusted 9 mm Beretta semi-automatic pistol in the trunk. Ross was charged with the murders after his gun was forensically linked by the LAPD to the bullets from the murders. He was released after independent forensic analysis found it unlikely that Ross' gun was the murder weapon. All three of those murders remain unsolved.

One particular group of killings, which were linked by common elements including the use of a .25 caliber firearm, remained unsolved and unaccounted for by any other known serial killer. The first known murder in this series was the murder of Debra Jackson in August 1985, which was linked to the August 1986 murder of Henrietta Wright by forensic firearm examination. By 1987, there were seven victims linked to the same gun, all of whom had been shot in the chest at close range. Two decades later, the perpetrator of these crimes was dubbed the "Grim Sleeper" due to the long period of apparent inactivity between murders.

=== 2000s investigation ===
In May 2007, the slaying of Janecia Peters, 25, was linked through DNA analysis to at least 11 unsolved murders in Los Angeles, the first of which occurred in 1985. That same year, in secrecy, the LAPD formed the "800 Task Force," composed of six detectives and overseen by the Robbery-Homicide Unit. After a four-month investigation, LA Weekly investigative reporter Christine Pelisek broke the news of the task force's existence, the link between Peters' killing and the earlier murders, and the silence of Mayor Antonio Villaraigosa and Police Chief William Joseph Bratton regarding the killer's existence. Villaraigosa and Bratton neither issued a press release nor warned the community. In some cases, LA Weekly was the first to inform the families that their daughters had long been confirmed as victims of a serial killer.

In early-September 2008, Los Angeles officials announced that they were offering a $500,000 reward to help catch the killer. On November 1, the case was featured on the Fox program America's Most Wanted. On February 25, 2009, Bratton addressed the press for the first time regarding the case, at which time the police formally gave the killer the "Grim Sleeper" nickname chosen by LA Weekly. Bratton also released a 9-1-1 call from the 1980s in which a man reported seeing a body being dumped by Franklin, giving a detailed description and license plate number of a van connected with the now-closed Cosmopolitan Church. In March 2009, Pelisek conducted an extensive interview with Enietra Washington, the sole survivor of Franklin's attacks. Washington described him as "a black man in his early 30s [ . . . ] He looked neat. Tidy. Kind of geeky. He wore a black polo shirt tucked into khaki trousers." She also described the interior and exterior of his vehicle.

== Arrest and further investigation ==
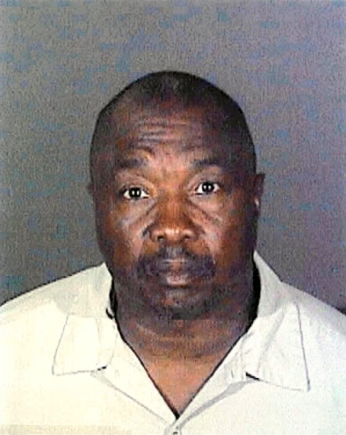
Franklin's mug shot after his final arrest in 2010

Law enforcement missed an opportunity to catch Franklin because his DNA was not previously collected. In 2003, Franklin was convicted of a felony and was serving three years of supervised probation. In 2004, voters passed Proposition 69, which requires that DNA must be collected from all felons and everyone arrested on certain specified charges. It also requires the expansion of the DNA database. Authorities collected and sorted through thousands of DNA samples. While he was on probation, Franklin's DNA was supposed to have been entered into the database. It wasn't entered because between November 2004 and August 2005 probation officers did not collect samples from people who were on unsupervised probation. The probation department did not have the resources to collect samples until August 2005.

Franklin was identified at least in part on familial DNA analysis. Police had found no exact match between DNA found at the crime scenes and any of the profiles in California's DNA profile database, so they searched the database for stored profiles that demonstrated sufficient similarity to allow police to infer a familial relationship. They found similar DNA belonging to Franklin's son, Christopher, who had been convicted of a felony weapons charge in 2008. Christopher was too young to have committed the murders, but the familial DNA match led investigators to look at his father, Lonnie, as the likely perpetrator.

One undercover police officer pretended to be a waiter at a restaurant where Franklin ate, collecting dishes, silverware, glasses, and pizza crusts to obtain DNA. According to Cooley, detectives then used a piece of discarded pizza, along with saliva found on the victims, to establish a DNA match. On July 7, 2010, Franklin was arrested. The Los Angeles County District Attorney's Office charged him with 10 counts of murder, one count of attempted murder, and special circumstance allegation of multiple murders.

On December 16, 2010, the LAPD released 180 photos of women found in Franklin's home after unsuccessful attempts to identify the individuals, who were possibly additional victims. "These people are not suspects, we don't even know if they are victims, but we do know this: Lonnie Franklin's reign of terror in the city of Los Angeles, which spanned well over two decades, culminating with almost a dozen murder victims, certainly needs to be investigated further," said Police Chief Charlie Beck.

In all, investigators found over 1,000 photos and several hundred hours of video in his home. The images show mainly Black women of a wide age range, from teenagers to middle-aged and older, often nude. Police believe Franklin took many of the pictures, which show both conscious and unconscious individuals, dating back thirty years. The photos were released to the public in an effort to identify the women.

On November 3, 2011, Reuters reported that the police were considering Franklin as a suspect in six more slayings. The police were investigating two of the six as potential victims killed during a 14-year lapse between an initial spate of Grim Sleeper murders that ended in 1988 and several more that began in 2002. Of the remaining four victims, two bodies were discovered in the 1980s and two were reported missing in 2005 but the remains of the other two were never found, police said. Detectives said they linked Franklin to the six additional killings after reviewing hundreds of old case files and seeking the public's help in identifying a collection of 180 photographs of women and girls that were found in his possession.

== Trial and death ==
Franklin was charged with ten murders and one attempted murder and held without bail. He was never charged in the death of a suspected eleventh victim, a Black man, a crime for which DNA evidence was not found. After a lengthy pretrial discovery and several delays, the trial opened on February 16, 2016. Closing arguments began May 2, 2016, and the jury began deliberating May 4, 2016. On May 5, 2016, after nearly three months of trial and a day and a half of jury deliberation, Franklin was convicted of all counts. His sentencing hearing began a week later, on May 12, 2016.

At the hearing, prosecutors presented evidence relating to four other victims they believed had been killed by Franklin. The four victims were not among the original set identified by DNA and ballistic evidence as Grim Sleeper victims, and had only been identified as such after his arrest. Three victims, Sharon Alicia Dismuke, Inez Warren, and Georgia Mae Thompson, were identified as likely Grim Sleeper victims by task force officers investigating unsolved missing persons and homicide reports dating back to 1976. The fourth, Rolenia Morris, was identified from evidence found at Franklin's garage after his arrest. Her body has never been found. Prosecutors did not charge Franklin with these murders for fear of delaying the trial even further. On June 6, 2016, a Los Angeles County jury sentenced Franklin to death. On August 10, the Superior Court sentenced Franklin on each count, naming the individual victims.

On March 28, 2020, Franklin was found dead in his cell. There were no signs of trauma on his body. His cause of death and the results of the autopsy have not been publicly released.

== Victims ==
Prosecutors suspect that Lonnie Franklin's first victim was Sharon Alicia Dismuke, who was killed on January 15, 1984. His first confirmed victim was Debra Jackson, whose murder occurred in August 1985. Franklin apparently took a 14-year hiatus after his last known crime in 1988, and his next confirmed murder occurred in 2002. As a result of this apparent dormancy, he was nicknamed the "Grim Sleeper". Investigators have stated they believe it is likely that there were other as-yet-unidentified victims during that time frame. The last confirmed murder was in January 2007.

All but one of his victims were Black women. One of his suspected victims was a Black man. Many of his victims were sex workers, and Franklin was known to have had frequent contact with sex workers. All of his victims were found outdoors, often in alleys a short distance from downtown Los Angeles. He shot all of his victims with a .25 caliber gun. Franklin took many photographs of nude women and kept the records in his garage.

=== Grim Sleeper ===
- 21-year-old Sharon Alicia Dismuke was found dead in South Park, Los Angeles, on January 15, 1984. She was not considered a Grim Sleeper victim until after Franklin's arrest. Evidence linking the modus operandi of Dismuke's murder to Franklin's other murders was presented at Franklin's sentencing.
- Debra Ronette Jackson, 29, was shot three times in the chest and her body was found August 10, 1985, in an alley near West Gage Avenue in Vermont-Slauson, Los Angeles.
- 35-year-old Henrietta Wright was found dead of multiple gunshot wounds on August 12, 1986, in an alley near the 2500 block of West Vernon Avenue in Hyde Park, Los Angeles. Wright's body was found under a discarded mattress; she may have been killed elsewhere and dumped in the alley.
- Thomas Sylvester Steele, 36, was found dead on August 14, 1986, at the intersection of 71st Street and Halldale Avenue in Harvard Park, Los Angeles. Franklin was not charged due to lack of evidence. Police said that Steele was killed possibly because he was a friend of another victim or because he had discovered Franklin's crimes.
- 23-year-old Barbara Bethune Ware was found dead January 10, 1987, in the 1300 block of East 56th Street in Central-Alameda, Los Angeles.
- Bernita Rochelle Sparks, 26, was found dead on April 15, 1987, in the 9400 block of South Western Avenue in Gramercy Park, Los Angeles. She had been shot and her body was discovered in a trash bin.
- 26-year-old Mary Katherine Lowe was found dead on October 31, 1987, in the 8900 block of Western Avenue in Gramercy Park, Los Angeles. Her body was dumped in an alley and covered after having been shot.
- Lachrica Denise Jefferson, 22, was found dead on January 30, 1988, in the 2000 block of West 102nd Place in Westmont, Los Angeles County.
- Inez Elizabeth Warren, 28, was shot on August 15, 1988. She was found unconscious in an alley, then died at a nearby hospital in Gramercy Park, Los Angeles. Warren was not considered a Grim Sleeper victim until after Franklin's arrest.
- 18-year-old Alicia Monique Alexander was found dead on September 11, 1988, in an alley near 43rd Place and Western Avenue in Vermont Square, Los Angeles.
- 30-year-old Enietra Margette Washington was attacked in Gramercy Park, Los Angeles, on November 20, 1988. She is the only confirmed survivor mentioned during the trial. She accepted a ride from Franklin before he drove her down an alleyway where he shot and left her for dead.
- Fredia Gibbs, a 30-year-old martial artist and basketball player, was attacked in the Fall of 1993 in Inglewood, California. Franklin spiked her drinks at a domino game party they both attended, offered Gibbs a ride home in his van and attempted to rape her once trapped inside. She fought him off. She is one of the two only known survivors and recounts her experience in online interviews.
- Georgia Mae Thomas, 43, died on December 28, 2000, after being shot in South Park, Los Angeles. Thomas was not considered a Grim Sleeper victim until evidence linking Thomas' murder to Franklin's other murders was presented at Franklin's sentencing.
- Princess Cheyanne Berthomieux, 15, was found strangled and beaten on March 19, 2002, in an Inglewood, California alley. Her nude body was found by a passer-by in the shrubs. She had last been seen by her family on December 21, 2001.
- 35-year-old Valerie Louise McCorvey was found dead on July 11, 2003, on Denker Avenue between 108th and 109th streets in Westmont, Los Angeles County.
- 18-year-old Ayellah Gbo Dzata Marshall was last seen at a medical facility in Hawthorne, California, on February 1, 2005. Her body has never been found. Her school identification card was found in Franklin's garage. Evidence linking Franklin to Marshall was not sufficient to pursue.
- 31-year-old Rolenia Adele Morris was last seen in the 9000 block of south Western Avenue in Los Angeles, California, on September 10, 2005. Her body has never been found. Her Nevada driver's license and two sexually explicit pictures of her were found in Franklin's garage. Prosecutors presented this evidence at Franklin's sentencing.
- Janecia Lavette Peters, 25, was found dead on January 1, 2007, in the 9500 block of South Western Avenue in Gramercy Park, Los Angeles. She had been shot and covered with a garbage bag.

=== Belize Ripper ===
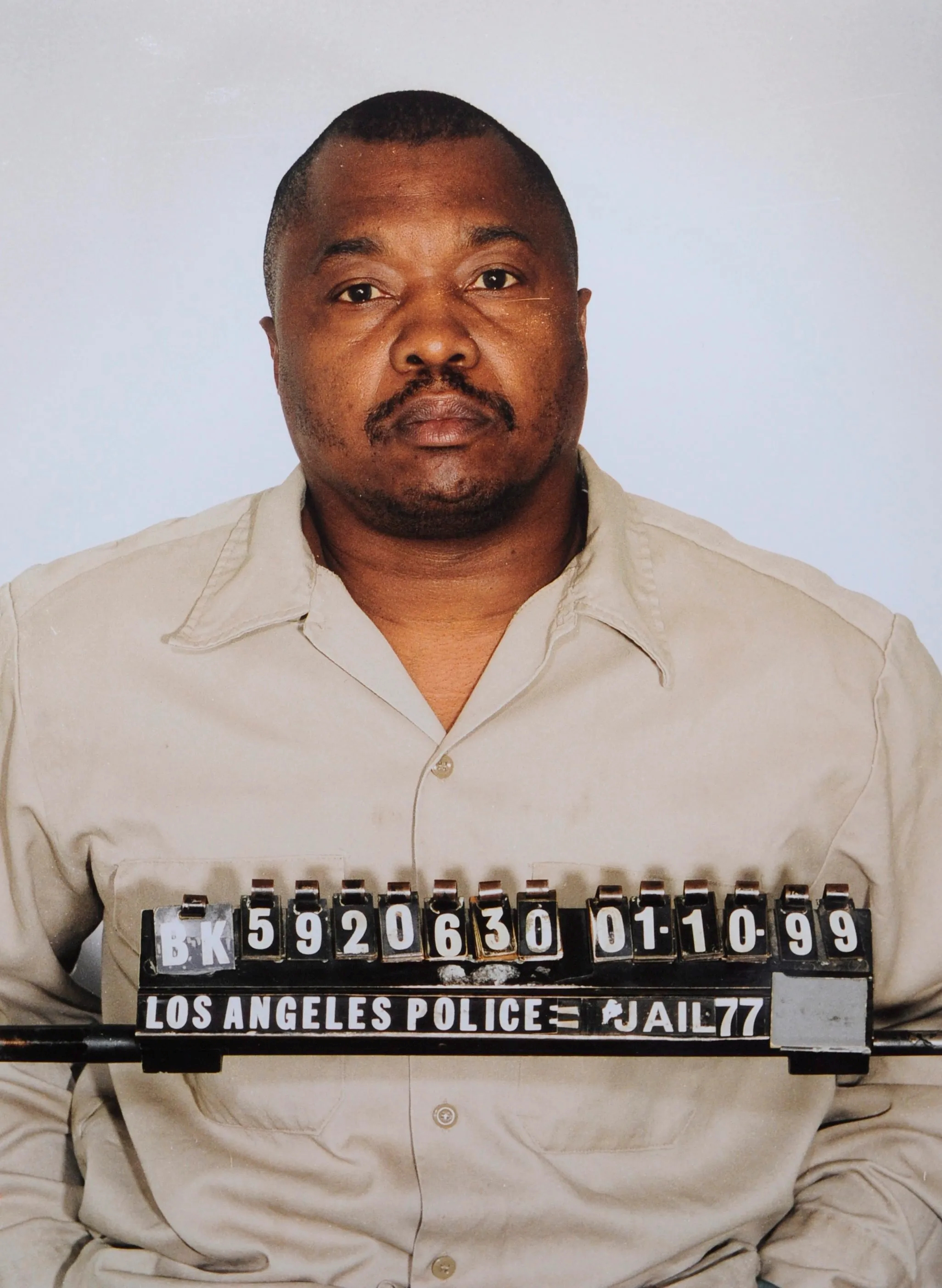
Franklin in a 1999 police mug shot

It has been suggested by law enforcement that Franklin could be a possible suspect for the abduction, rape and murder of five girls in Belize City between 1998 and 2000. Franklin had connections to the country via his marriage to Sylvia Castillo, who was from Belize. In addition, Franklin's 14-year break matched the murder spree, one of the victim's aunts allegedly saw him in Belize City at the time, and the van used in one of his proven killings was later found in Belize. All served as potential circumstantial evidence of his involvement; however, he was never charged with the killings.

=== Hereford murder ===
Edwinta Hereford, 19, was found dead on May 16, 2010, on the 105 Freeway near Garfield Avenue in Paramount, California. Hereford had been pushed from a speeding car moving east on the 105 Freeway. Her body was discovered within an hour of being thrown from the vehicle. She had been killed by severe blunt-force trauma. Hereford was last seen at Snappy's Liquor near Imperial Highway and Normandie Avenue in Westmont, California, placing her in the same general area where the other Grim Sleeper killings took place. Asked if Hereford's case could be connected to the Grim Sleeper murders, the lead investigator in her case said that they have not yet "ruled it in or out." Hereford's homicide remains unsolved.

=== Possible murders ===
Four missing women are thought to have been among Franklin's victims, according to their relatives. The four women frequented the area close to Franklin's house where the bodies of his alleged victims were discovered and all were involved in drug use and prostitution.

- 32-year-old Cathern Davis was last seen in the 400 block of west 49th Street in Los Angeles, California on June 9, 1982.
- 26-year-old Rosalind Giles was last seen in the 400 block of east 64th Street in Los Angeles, California on January 10, 1991.
- Lisa Renee Knox, 28, was last seen in the 1000 block of 22nd Street in Los Angeles, California on May 11, 1993.
- 37-year-old Anita Yolanda Parker was last seen in the 6000 block of Brynhurst Avenue in Los Angeles, California on November 17, 1998.

== In popular culture ==
- The 2010 Law and Order: LA episode "Ballona Creek" has similarities to the Grim Sleeper case.
- In 2014, British filmmaker Nick Broomfield created a documentary film about Franklin, Tales of the Grim Sleeper.
- In 2014, Lifetime premiered a movie, The Grim Sleeper, based on the case. It was produced by Michael Jaffe Films Ltd. and stars Dreama Walker, Macy Gray, Ernie Hudson, and Michael O’Neill.
- In 2017, journalist Christine Pelisek published The Grim Sleeper, an account of the investigation into the case.
- The story was covered during season 1 of the Investigation Discovery show The Face of Evil in episode 4, titled "The Grim Sleeper", which premiered on May 9, 2019.
- The 2018 television series 35 Serial Killers the World Wants to Forget analyzed the Grim Sleeper case along with Gerald and Charlene Gallego in their eighth episode.
- Victim Enietra Margette discusses her encounter with Franklin in season 1, episode 7 of the A&E series I Survived a Serial Killer.
- In 2024, Tubi released a documentary about the case titled Evil Among Us: The Grim Sleeper. It was directed by Victoria Drew and contained some reenactments.

== See also ==
- Southside Slayer
- List of serial killers in the United States
- List of serial killers by number of victims
