= Anthony McKnight =

American serial killer and rapist

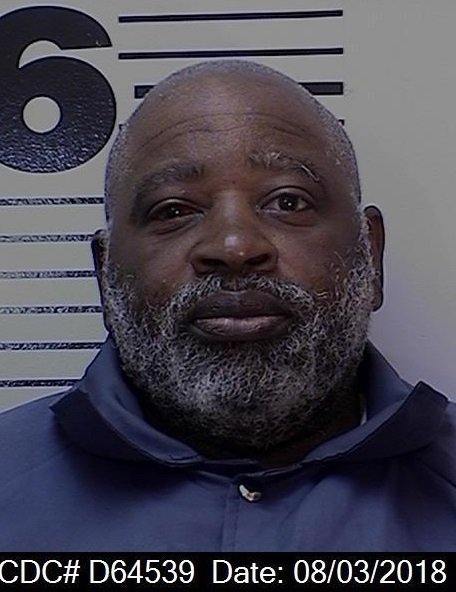
- CDC inmate Mugshot
- Born: 1954; United States
- Died: October 17, 2019 (aged 65); San Quentin State Prison, California, U.S.
- Occupations: United States Army; United States Navy
- Status: Deceased
- Convictions: First degree murder with special circumstances (5 counts); Attempted murder Rape with force or violence Assault with a deadly weapon Oral copulation Kidnapping
- Penalty: Death

Details
- Victims: 5
- Span of crimes: September 1985 – January 1986
- Country: United States
- State: California
- Date apprehended: January 24, 1986

Anthony McKnight (1954 – October 17, 2019) was an American serial killer, rapist, kidnapper, and sex offender who killed five women and assaulted five others in Oakland, California, over a period of five months in late 1985 and early 1986. In 2008, he was found guilty of these murders and sentenced to death, but died awaiting execution in 2019.

== Early life ==
Little is known about McKnight's early life. He was born in 1954, and enlisted in the United States Army in 1982. He also enlisted in the Navy and later served at Naval Air Station Alameda, located in the San Francisco Bay Area near the cities of Alameda and Oakland. Also in 1982, McKnight was arrested by Oakland police while attempting to rape a girl who refused to have sex with him. He was not convicted and got off with a fine, but his information was entered in a sex offender database and his fingerprints entered in the U.S. criminal database.

In 1983 he got married, and had a child. McKnight was known as a lively and friendly man, making him popular in the area, with his many friends describing him very positively, unaware that he was a sex offender.

== Crimes and convictions ==
McKnight's first attack was in October when he stabbed a girl in the neck and chest, then raped her and left her unconscious on the outskirts of one of the western districts of Oakland, where she was found and taken to a hospital. A few days later, he raped and beat up another girl at one of the city's construction sites. The victim managed to escape McKnight and hide in a drainage ditch. She then notified the police.

By December 1985, McKnight had carried out two more similar attacks, in one case inflicting 10 stab wounds on the victim, and stabbing the other in the face, but both survived and subsequently gave law enforcement officers a description of the offender, saying that he was a black man, early 30s and with a beard and mustache. One of them also gave a description of his vehicle and part of the license plate. In January 1986, McKnight carried out another attack, during which he raped the victim, attempted to strangle her, and then dumped her in Oakland's industrial area. She survived the ordeal.

In late 1985, the Oakland Police Department (OPD) became aware of a serial rapist targeting young black women in city's suburbs and outlying areas. Over time, the unknown rapist became the main suspect in the murders of at least seven women and girls in Oakland and its suburbs, as the exact same modus operandi and pattern were used. When the OPD obtained a vehicle description, they started examining men in the area who matched the physical description and owned similar vehicles.

They came across McKnight, who immediately stuck out to investigators because of his criminal background. They found out that at the time of the rapes, McKnight had been stationed at Treasure Island in the San Francisco Bay area as part of the Navy. In January, he was taken to a police station and interrogated. He denied attacking anyone, and since there was not enough evidence to arrest him, he was soon released. In January 1986, investigators were able to obtain a photograph of McKnight and showed it to three of the victims, all of whom identified him as their rapist, and he was arrested on January 24, 1986. He was again interrogated, but still insisted his innocence. Despite being originally suspected in the seven murders, police found no evidence connecting McKnight to them, so he was only charged with the rapes and attempted murders. He did not plead guilty.

The results of a complete blood count showed his blood matched that of the rapist. On August 24, 1987, McKnight was found guilty of several cases of kidnapping, assault, rape and attempted murder, receiving 63 years imprisonment.

He was incarcerated at Salinas Valley State Prison. Twelve years into his sentence, investigators again tried to tie McKnight with unsolved murders in the Oakland area and possibly other areas in or around the East Bay. They got permission to take a DNA sample from McKnight and enter it into California's Combined DNA Index System, (CODIS). McKnight obliged with a blood and saliva sample. In subsequent years, thanks to a DNA profiling test, McKnight was connected to five rape-murders:

- 22-year-old Betty Stuart. Her throat was slit on September 22, 1985.
- 17-year-old Diane Stone. Her corpse was found on the grounds of a primary school in Oakland with knife wounds to the neck on September 29, 1985.
- 13-year-old Talita Dixon. She was stabbed to death on October 8, 1985.
- 18-year-old Monique Davis. She was killed by several blows to the head with a blunt object on December 9, 1985.
- 24-year-old Beverly Bryant. She was beaten to death on December 25, 1985.

His trial started in August 2008. McKnight was charged with all five murders, which made him death penalty eligible. McKnight pled not guilty to all charges, but the prosecution cited the overwhelming DNA evidence that tied him to the crime scenes. After almost two months, the jury of seven women and five men found McKnight guilty of the murders, and he was sentenced to death on November 17, 2008. He did not admit his guilt. He was transferred to San Quentin State Prison to await his execution.

== Death ==
In the years after, McKnight sat on death row awaiting execution. On October 17, 2019, after having spent more than 33 years behind bars, and 11 years on death row, McKnight died at the age of 65 from unspecified causes.

== See also ==
- Charles Jackson
- Joseph James DeAngelo
- Joseph Naso
- Philip Joseph Hughes Jr.
- Roger Kibbe
- Franklin Lynch

General

- List of serial killers in the United States
