= Charles Jackson (serial killer) =

American rapist & serial killer (1937–2002)

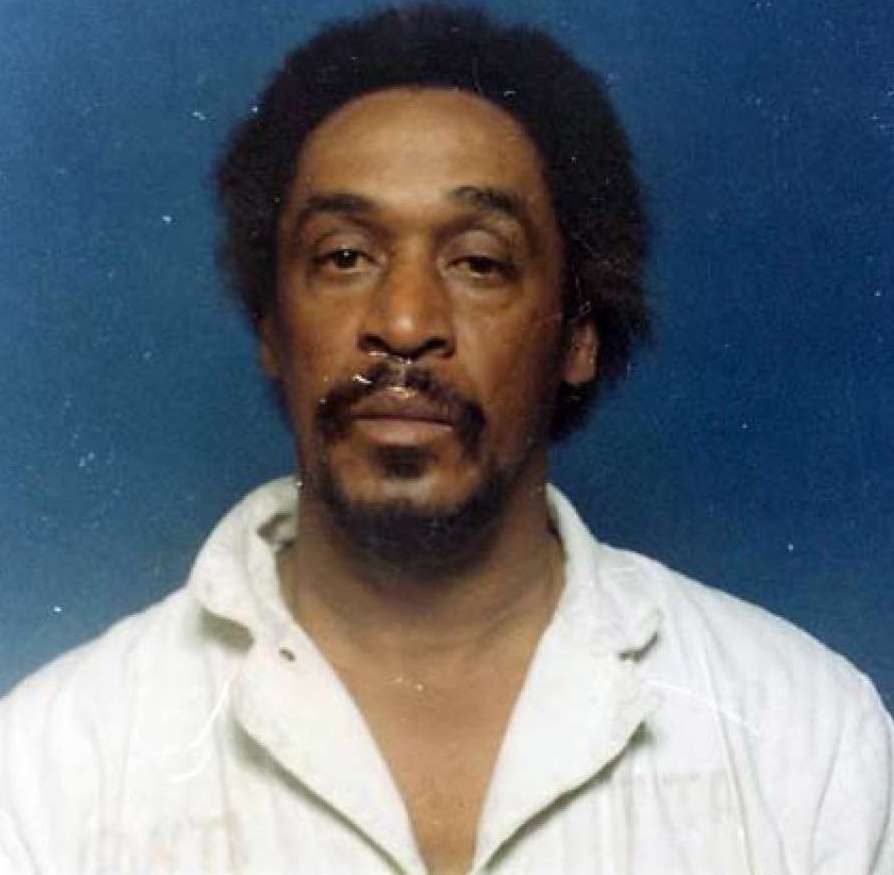
- Born: Charles Jackson Jr. February 12, 1937; Louisiana, U.S.
- Died: February 15, 2002 (aged 65); Folsom State Prison, Folsom, California, U.S.
- Other name: "The East Bay Slayer"
- Convictions: First degree murder with special circumstances (1 count); Forcible oral copulation
- Penalty: Life imprisonment

Details
- Victims: 8+
- Span of crimes: 1975–1982
- Country: United States
- State: California
- Date apprehended: January 8, 1982

Charles Jackson Jr. (February 12, 1937 – February 15, 2002), known as The East Bay Slayer, was an American serial killer and rapist who murdered at least seven women and one man in the San Francisco Bay area between 1975 and 1982. Convicted of a single murder, he died in prison in 2002 before the more complete exposure of his crimes was revealed based on DNA profiling. He is also suspected of committing several more murders.

== Early life ==
Charles Jackson Jr. was born on February 12, 1937, in Louisiana. Shortly after his birth, his family moved to Mississippi, where young Charles grew up in the countryside. He lived in a socially disadvantageous environment, as his father was an alcoholic who was aggressive towards him and other family members. Due to material difficulties, Jackson dropped out of high school in the early 1950s and started spending a lot of time on the street. He became involved with the criminal subcultures and soon delved into crime himself.

== Crimes ==
In 1953, at the age of 16, Jackson was arrested and charged with theft. Subsequently, his crimes only got worse. He moved to California in the late 1950s along with his mother, and over the next 20 years, Jackson was repeatedly arrested on charges of committing crimes such as burglary, rape, assault, and molestation of minors between 1962 and 1978.

The last time he was released was on September 12, 1981, after which he started working as a handyman for some time, as well as doing other odd jobs. Up until his final arrest at the age of 44, Jackson was living with his mother in her home in Montclair.

=== Murders ===
Jackson killed at least six women, one man, and one child between June 1975 and January 1982.

- In June 1975, 19-year-old Sonya Higginbotham was murdered in her Oakland home. She was found sexually assaulted and stabbed to death.
- In August 1975, 27-year-old Ann Johnson was found stabbed and sexually assaulted in her Montclair home.
- On April 22, 1978, 11-year-old Cynthia Waxman and a cousin were playing with a kitten in a field in Moraga, near Buckingham Drive. The cousin left to get money to buy food for the kitten, but Cynthia was gone when she returned. Several hours later, Cynthia's mother found her body in nearby bushes.
- On November 22, 1981, 62-year-old Henry Vila and his 59-year-old wife Edith were found stabbed to death in their home in Albany Hill. Edith was sexually assaulted by her attacker. It was determined the killer broke into the home around nighttime.
- On December 4, 1981, 37-year-old Betty Jo Grunzweig was found stabbed in her home in Oakland's Trestle Glen neighborhood. She was still alive when her daughter found her. Betty told her daughter, "I think he was a rapist," before dying on the way to the hospital. Before her murder, Betty had told her friends that she was receiving strange phone calls from an unknown man. She also stated that sometimes while outside she felt watched, but assumed it to be just her mind playing tricks on her.
- On December 8, 1981, 34-year-old Gail Leslie Slocum was found stabbed to death in her yard in Oakland.
- On January 5, 1982, 44-year-old Joan Stewart, a San Francisco City College biology professor, was raped, strangled, and stabbed several times in the woodlands near Montclair.

== Arrest ==
On January 6, the morning after the murder, Stewart's body was found. On her body, police collected a half-eaten piece of Canadian bacon and they came to the conclusion that whoever the killer was, they were eating Canadian bacon when they attacked Stewart and must have accidentally dropped it. During the investigation, several eyewitnesses who were around during the time were found. They reported a suspicious vehicle driving erratically, and one neighborhood reported the vehicle trying to lure children into it. The person described as driving the car was a black male with bushy hair and a scruffy mustache. It was found during the investigation that this vehicle was seen parked nearby when Stewart was attacked. They wrote down the license plate on the car. The vehicle was spotted on January 8 by a police patrol car, and they questioned its owner, who was Jackson.

They went to Jackson's home, which he shared with his mother. Jackson's mother told the police that every morning she wraps a piece of Canadian bacon to give to him before he goes off to work. This and the plate number were enough evidence to arrest and officially charge Jackson with Stewart's murder. In 1983, he was found guilty and received a sentence of life imprisonment as punishment. But, in 1985, Jackson was re-tried after evidence of a judicial error emerged. Jackson's second trial started in 1986, when he was again sentenced to life imprisonment.

== Implication in other murders ==
In 1998, police departments around the East Bay area conducted DNA testing on unsolved cases that dated between the 1970s and the early 1990s. In 1999, investigators positively identified a match in Charles Jackson's DNA to biological evidence left at a November 1981 double homicide in Albany. The victims were 62-year-old Henry Vila and his 59-year-old wife, Edith. Their bodies were found on November 22, 1981. They were stabbed to death, and there was evidence that Edith was sexually assaulted by her attacker. It was determined the killer broke into the home around nighttime, around the time the Vila's were getting ready for bed. When Jackson was informed his DNA was a match to the DNA left at that crime scene, he refused to come out of his cell in Folsom State Prison and speak with investigators. Investigators decided not to charge Jackson with the two other murders, saying it might get in the way of the investigation. However, on February 15, 2002, Charles Jackson died from a heart attack in his cell in Folsom State Prison. He was 65 years old. His death didn't slow the investigators down, and in 2005, based on results from the DNA research, Jackson's involvement was revealed in the murders of Higginbotham, Johnson, Waxman, Grunzweig and Slocum. Jackson's true victim count is currently unknown, since there were at least six other serial killers in the Contra Costa County, California, area during his murder spree.

== See also ==
- Anthony McKnight
- Joseph James DeAngelo
- Joseph Naso
- Philip Joseph Hughes Jr.
- Roger Kibbe
- Franklin Lynch

General:

- List of serial killers in the United States
