= Philip Joseph Hughes Jr. =

American serial killer

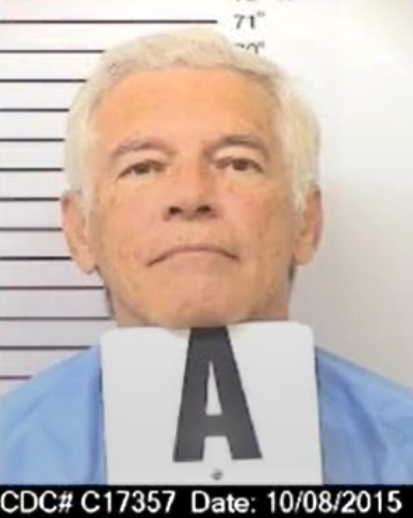
- Born: Philip Joseph Hughes Jr. 1947 or 1948 (age 78–79)
- Other name: "The East Bay Strangler"
- Conviction: First degree murder (3 counts)
- Penalty: Life imprisonment

Details
- Victims: 3+
- Span of crimes: 1972–1975
- Country: United States
- State: California
- Date apprehended: 1979
- Imprisoned at: California Correctional Institution

Philip Joseph Hughes Jr. (born 1947/1948) known as The East Bay Strangler, is an American convicted serial killer. He killed at least three young women in Contra Costa County throughout the 1970s with the help of his ex-wife, Suzanne Perrin.

He is currently serving life imprisonment at California Correctional Institution.

== Known victims ==
=== Maureen Field ===
On November 14, 1972, Maureen Field, 19, was waiting for her father to pick her up after ending her shift at Kmart, when Hughes offered her a ride. When her father, Joe Field, drove up to the store, he learned she had left earlier, but was not concerned. Two days later the family received an anonymous phone call from a man saying, "I'm calling about your daughter. She's dead and I killed her." The man never called again. Several months later, on February 15, 1973, her badly decomposed body was found along Morgan Territory Road.

=== Lisa Ann Beery ===
On January 26, 1974, Hughes and his wife, Suzanne Perrin, kidnapped Lisa Beery, 15, at knifepoint while hitchhiking near her home. They took her to a house in Oakland, where she was forced into the basement, sexually assaulted, and stabbed to death. Her body was wrapped in a sheet and dumped in a shallow grave in a deserted area in Contra Costa County. Her body was found five years later in Moraga.

=== Letitia Fagot ===
On March 19, 1975, Letitia Fagot, 25, was found nude in her Walnut Creek home after a welfare check was requested by her coworkers when she failed to show up for work. She was found strangled and suffered a severe blow to the head by a blunt object.

== Arrest ==
In July 1979, a friend of Suzanne Perrin contacted the Oakland police department on Perrin's behalf, due to Perrin's fear of Hughes. The following day, Perrin agreed to meet a police sergeant at a restaurant and disclosed information linking Hughes to the murder of Lisa Beery. On July 13, 1979, police obtained a search warrant for Hughes' Pleasanton home to seize evidence.

== Trials ==
On April 3, 1980, Hughes was found guilty of the first degree murder of Lisa Beery. A jury ruled on April 8, 1980 that Hughes was legally sane during the time of the murder. Dr. Hugh Winig testified that Hughes had, "an actual need to kill someone and have sex with them after they were dead." Hughes was sentenced to life in prison on May 21, 1980.

On October 14, 1980, six months after his first murder conviction, Hughes was found guilty of the first degree murders of Maureen Field and Letitia Fagot. On November 25, 1980, a Superior Court judge sentenced Hughes to two concurrent life sentences, calling him "a dangerous man to society."

In both cases, Hughes's ex-wife, Suzanne Perrin, testified against him. She was granted immunity for her testimony, despite her participation, which included providing Hughes with a list of potential victims, kidnapping, and the disposing of Field's body.

On August 12, 1983, the state Court of Appeal upheld the murder conviction of Hughes for the Contra Costa slayings.

After seven parole hearings from 1985 to 2006, Hughes began voluntarily waiving his right to hearings. In 2015, he stipulated that he was not suitable for parole, agreeing not to request a new parole hearing until 2025.

== See also ==
- Anthony McKnight
- Charles Jackson
- Franklin Lynch
- Joseph James DeAngelo
- Joseph Naso
- Roger Kibbe

=== General ===
- List of serial killers in the United States
