= Daniel Siebert =

Daniel Siebert may refer to:

- Daniel Lee Siebert (1954–2008), American serial killer
- Daniel Siebert (ethnobotanist) (born 1968), American ethnobotanist, pharmacognosist, and author
- Daniel Siebert (referee) (born 1984), German referee
