= Southside Slayer =

Serial killer epithet

The Southside Slayer was a collective epithet used by the media and police to what was initially believed to be a single serial killer who killed upwards of a hundred predominantly black women in the Los Angeles area from the 1980s to the 1990s. It later turned out that the killings were committed by several different, unrelated murderers who coincidentally operated in the same area and timeframe.

== Perpetrators ==
- Louis Craine (1957–1989): two out of his four confirmed murders, from 1984 to 1987, were linked to the case
- Ivan Hill (born 1961): committed at least one of the killings, linked to a total of eight unrelated murders from 1979 to 1994; suspect in others
- Michael Hughes (born 1958): committed at least one of the killings, linked to a total of six unrelated murders from 1986 to 1993; suspect in others, including in the states of Michigan and Maryland
- Lonnie Franklin (1952–2020): committed at least one of the killings, linked to a total of nine unrelated murders from 1984 to 2007; suspect in others
- Daniel Lee Siebert (1954–2008): committed at least one of the killings, linked to a total of nine unrelated murders across multiple states from 1979 to 1986; suspect in three others
- Chester Turner (born 1966): committed at least one of the killings, linked to a total of fourteen unrelated murders from 1987 to 1998; suspect in others

== See also ==
- Freeway Killer
- Southside Strangler (Chicago)
