= Freeway Killer =

Epithet used for serial killers

The Freeway Killer was an epithet that the American media and several investigative agencies coined in March 1980 to what was believed to be a single serial killer murdering young male victims in Southern California and dumping their bodies alongside or upon freeways.

== Murders ==
The Freeway Killer murders were thought to have begun around 1972, and escalated in 1979 and early 1980. The killer(s) selected young male hitchhikers, schoolboys or, occasionally, male prostitutes as victims. A majority of the victims were teenagers or young adults and were of slender or stocky builds. Several were also tortured before death and some were even dismembered or disemboweled. By early June 1980, authorities had linked forty murders to the series.

An extensive investigation led to the arrest of William Bonin on June 11, 1980. Bonin, along with several accomplices, were convicted of over a dozen murders linked to the Freeway Killer spree. Even after Bonin's imprisonment, the murders continued for nearly three years until the arrest of Randy Kraft on May 14, 1983. At his trial for sixteen counts of murder, Kraft's defense attempted to push the blame onto a third serial killer, Patrick Kearney, who had been caught in 1977. Due to this, Kearney is often labeled as the third Freeway Killer even though his murders differed in modus operandi and were never thought to be linked with the original series.

== Perpetrators ==
- Patrick Kearney (born 1939), age 37 when captured in 1977
- William Bonin (1947–1996) and several accomplices, age 33 when captured in 1980
- Randy Kraft (born 1945), age 38 when captured in 1983

== See also ==
- Southside Slayer
- Southside Strangler (Chicago)
