= Southside Strangler (Chicago) =

1990s and 2000s series of murders in Illinois

The Southside Strangler is the media epithet given by the media, and later used by law enforcement, to a serial killer active in the South Side of Chicago from the 1990s and 2000s, responsible for the murders of numerous girls and young women. It would later be established that the killings were committed by different offenders, including several different serial killers.

== Murders ==
All of the killings took place in urban areas within South Chicago, which are inhabited predominantly by minorities and other marginalized elements of society with low social status, education and often, plagued by violent crime. The area is known for their severe crime situation, especially during the 1990s, when several hundred murders were committed on the streets, most of them involving rape. Many of the victims were either engaged in prostitution or were drug addicts.

== Perpetrators ==
- Andre Crawford: killed 11 women between 1993 and 1999 in Englewood. Known for having sex with the victims' corpses.
- Hubert Geralds: killed 5 women between 1994 and 1995 in Englewood, earning him the nickname The Englewood Strangler. In 1999, following a DNA test, he was found guilty of killing a woman for whose murder another Chicago resident, Derrick Fluellen, was convicted of in 1995. Fluellen was suspected in several other killings in Englewood, but later investigations revealed that he had been coerced into confessing. In November 1999, the charges against Fluellen were dropped. Initially, Geralds was convicted of six murders, but one of his convictions was overturned after Andre Crawford admitted to that murder and his confession demonstrated more details than Geralds' initial one.
- Kevin Taylor: former Cheesecake Factory worker that killed 4 women over the summer of 2001, discarding their bodies in alleyways, garbage cans, and abandoned houses throughout the South Side.
- Gregory Clepper: according to investigators, he was active in different areas of the South Side between 1991 and 1996; Clepper was also wanted on a number of rape charges in Saint Paul, Minnesota, where he lived from December 1994 to July 1995. In early May 1996, Clepper was arrested for the strangulation of 30-year-old Patricia Scott, whose body he had kept in his room for some time, but later disposed of in a trash can behind a nearby school, aided by 29-year-old Eric Henderson and Clepper's 48-year-old mother. After his arrest, the police, based on evidence and testimony, stated that Clepper was a suspect in at least 26 murders. All the victims were involved in prostitution and drug addiction, most of them occurring near Gregory's house, with some of them being acquaintances. Henderson told police in early 1995 that he had even helped Clepper dispose of 28-year-old Alicia Thomas' corpse in a dumpster, where it was found on January 12, 1995. Clepper himself claimed that, while in a drugged state, he had strangled around 40 women in various ways, drawing maps and indicating locations of each dump site. However, after a DNA analysis was conducted, he was excluded in at least 14 cases, and his testimony declared invalid. Later on, Earl Mac Jr. would be arrested for one of the killings Clepper had admitted to. Ultimately, Gregory Clepper would be solely convicted of Patricia Scott's murder in July 2001, receiving 80 years imprisonment with no chance of parole. The Cook County Prosecutor's Office announced that they would conduct more investigations, but as of January 2021, no new charges have been brought against Clepper.
- Ralph Harris: attacked 26 women in Chatham and Avalon Park from 1992 to 1995, raping and killing six of them. A number of others survived with gunshot wounds of varying severity.
- Geoffrey T. Griffin: suspected of murdering seven sex workers and drug addicts in Roseland between 1998 and 2000.

== See also ==
- List of homicides in Illinois
- Freeway Killer
- Southside Slayer
