= Tales of the Grim Sleeper =

- Directed by: Nick Broomfield
- Written by: Nick Broomfield
- Produced by: Nick Broomfield
- Edited by: Marc Hoeferlin
- Distributed by: HBO
- Release dates: 29 August 2014 (Telluride); 30 January 2015
- Running time: 110 minutes
- Language: English

Tales of the Grim Sleeper is a 2014 documentary film about the serial killer Lonnie David Franklin Jr., nicknamed the Grim Sleeper. It was produced, directed, and written by Nick Broomfield.

== Reception ==
The film received positive reviews from critics. On Rotten Tomatoes, it has a 100% fresh rating, based on 36 reviews, with a weighted average of 7.7/10. It was shortlisted for the 87th Academy Awards.
