= Robert Mark Edwards =

American convicted murderer

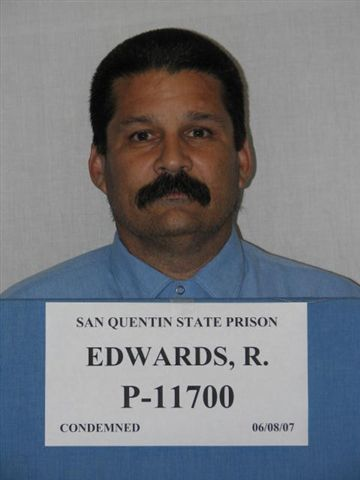
- Born: 1961 (age 64–65); Long Beach, California, U.S.
- Convictions: California; First degree murder with special circumstances Hawaii; Second degree murder Robbery; Sexual assault x2 Kidnapping; Burglary
- Penalty: Death (California); Life imprisonment (Hawaii)

Details
- Victims: 2
- Span of crimes: 1986–1993
- Country: United States
- States: California, Hawaii
- Date apprehended: February 2, 1993
- Imprisoned at: California Institution for Men, Chino, California

Robert Mark Edwards (born 1961) is an American murderer who killed two female realtors in sexually motivated murders, one in California in 1986 and another in Hawaii in 1993. In separate trials, he was sentenced to death and to life imprisonment in the respective states and is currently awaiting execution at the California Institution for Men.

== Murders ==
In May 1986, Edwards went to the Los Alamitos home of 55-year-old realtor Marjorie Elaine Deeble, the mother of his then-girlfriend Katherine Valentine. Once inside, he bound her hands and legs, a gag in her mouth, and a belt tied around her neck. After sexually assaulting her and sodomizing her with a hair mousse can, Edwards proceeded to beat her to death before stealing jewelry from her home and leaving the premises. After being reported missing for several days, police were called in to inspect Deeble's home, only to find her apartment door slightly open and her body lying on the floor. An autopsy was conducted on the day of the discovery, with Lt. Orville Lewis announcing in a press statement the following day that Deeble's death was ruled a murder, and that she was possibly sexually assaulted. At the time, Edwards was routinely questioned regarding the murder, but was not considered a serious suspect.

Sometime after the murder, Edwards, a convicted criminal with a record for offenses such as burglary, theft, auto theft, and drug offenses, violated his parole conditions by moving to Maui County, Hawaii, where he took up work as a roofer, to escape a car theft conviction. In 1990, he was arrested for attempting to stab a woman and charged with assault, but the case was not prosecuted as he was extradited to California to serve out his parole violation, which he served until early 1991. Afterwards, he and a girlfriend returned to Hawaii, where they bought an apartment in Kihei, and Edwards found work at a roofing company called Pat's Quality Roofing, where he was considered "normal" by his colleagues and employer alike.

On January 25, 1993, Edwards broke into the Kanoe Resort condominium of 67-year-old realtor Muriel E. Delbecq, an Indiana-born employee for Heritage Real Estate in Anchorage, Alaska who often vacationed in Kihei. After encountering her, he proceeded to tie her to the bed, before beating and strangling her to death. Afterwards, Edwards inserted a mousse can into Delbecq's vagina, shaved off her pubic hair, and mutilated body parts. After he was done violating the corpse, Edwards stole her wedding ring and several articles of clothing, including a pair of panties and a bra, which he later dumped in a nearby trash bin. Delbecq's body was found on January 26 but was identified two days later. On February 2, Edwards was arrested and charged with Delbecq's murder, in addition to two counts of sexual assault, robbery and kidnapping relating to the case. His initial bail was set at $500,000.

== Trials and imprisonment ==
Edwards' trial for the Delbecq murder was initially scheduled for October 25, 1993. Still, it was delayed until February 28, 1994, as his attorney filed a successful request for a mental evaluation at the Hawaii State Hospital. Around the same time, California authorities announced their intentions to charge him with the cold case murder of Deeble back in Los Alamitos after noticing that many details from the crime scenes matched, such as the victims having the same initials, their occupations and the way they had been murdered.

His trial began on March 1, 1994, and lasted two weeks. During the proceedings, Maui Deputy Prosecutor Joseph Barbaro presented the autopsy report of Delbecq's body, which showcased the many severe injuries she had suffered both pre and post-mortem, in addition to an abundance of physical and DNA evidence located at the crime scene. Despite claims by Edwards' court-appointed attorney Keith Tanaka, who claimed that none of this proved that his client had murdered the woman, the jury returned a guilty verdict on March 11. In early June 1994, Edwards was sentenced to five consecutive life terms plus $304,600 in restitution to the Delbecq family. Shortly after the sentence was handed down, extradition procedures to California were initiated.

Two years later, Edwards' trial in California commenced in Santa Ana. As Justice John J. Ryan had ruled that jurors could not be notified of the defendant's conviction in the Hawaii murder, prosecutor David L. Brent had to present evidence that showed the remarkable similarities in both murders, indicating that a single perpetrator committed them. In response, Edwards' defense attorney Daniel P. Bates pointed out that there were obvious differences, such as Deeble's neck being broken, as well as having bite marks and scratches, which Delbecq's body lacked. Despite these notable differences, the jurors found Edwards guilty, with his sentencing date scheduled for November 4. As he was facing a possible death penalty, one of his attorneys, Tim Severin, pleaded that the jurors be willing to spare his life, pointing out Edwards' history of abuse at the hands of his father, his drug and alcohol addictions, and most notably, his undying love for his young son. In contrast, his former girlfriends said that he was violent during sex, often trying to choke them and even attempting to sodomize one with a bottle.

At the initial sentencing phase, the jury were deadlocked in a 9-3 decision in favor of the death penalty, resulting in a mistrial. As a result, a new trial with a new set of jurors was rescheduled for November 1997. Like with the previous trial, both the prosecutor and attorney presented similar evidence and arguments for and against the death penalty. On September 9, 1998, the jury returned a unanimous verdict of guilty on all charges, resulting in a swift death sentence for Edwards.

== Status ==
As of June 2026, Edwards remains on death row at the California Institution for Men. He and his lawyers have unsuccessfully attempted to commute his sentence on several occasions, the latest being in 2013, which was denied by the Supreme Court of California.

== See also ==
- Capital punishment in California
- List of death row inmates in the United States § California
