= West Park Terrace, Los Angeles =

West Park Terrace
- Neighborhood of Los Angeles
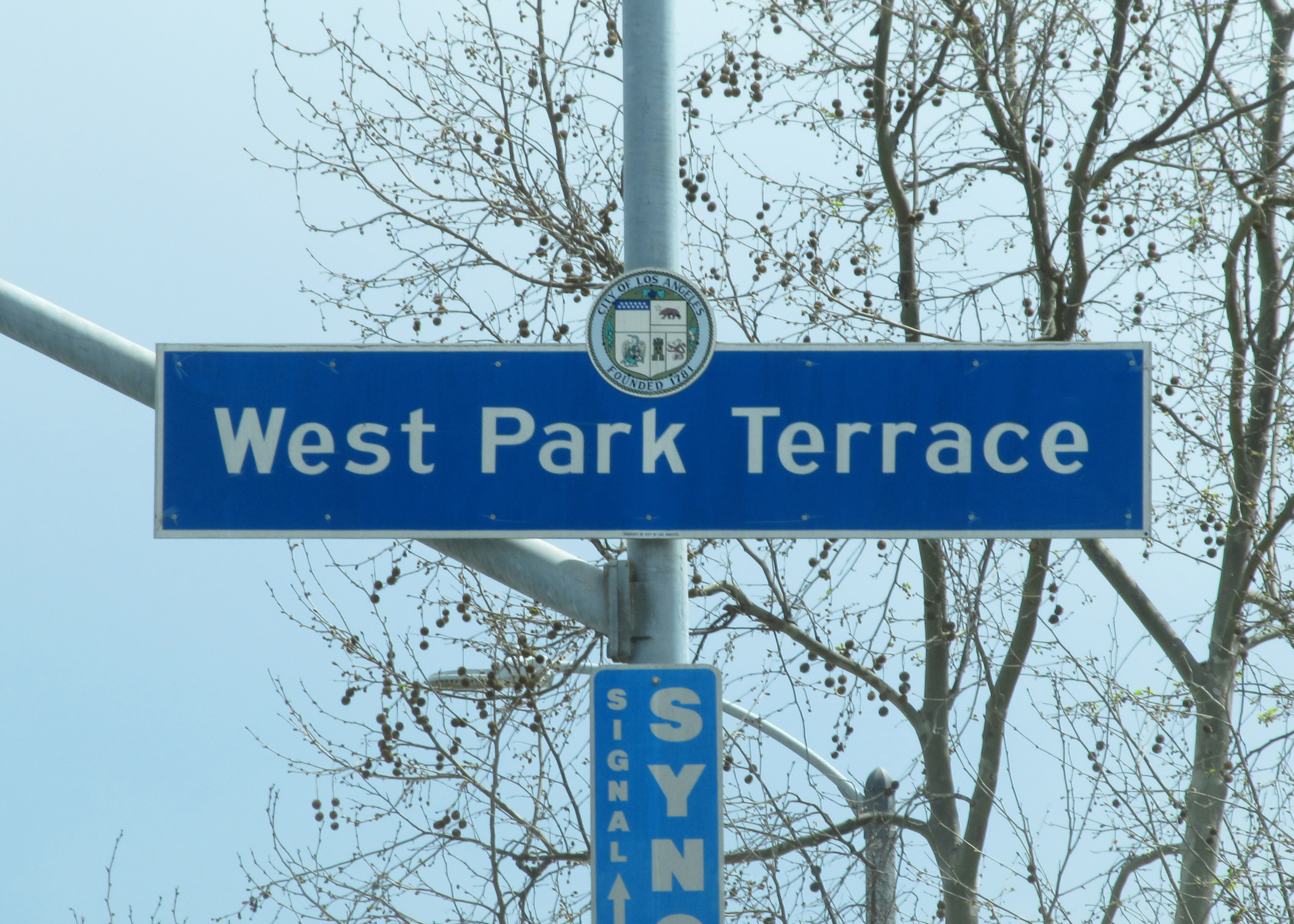
- West Park Terrace neighborhood sign located on Van Ness Avenue and Manchester Boulevard

- Location within South Los Angeles
- Coordinates: 33°57′31″N 118°18′01″W
- Country: United States
- State: California
- County: Los Angeles
- City: Los Angeles
- Time zone: Pacific
- Area code: 323

West Park Terrace is a neighborhood in South Los Angeles. There are two parks in the community.

== History ==
Beginning in 2000, the Eighth District Empowerment Congress began working on the "Naming Neighborhoods Project" to identify and name the communities with the neighborhood council area. The first focus group was held at Hebrew Union College in June 2000. Through research, a meeting with an urban historian, and numerous community meetings, the Empowerment Congress ultimately outlined sixteen unique neighborhoods, including the neighborhood of West Park Terrace. The names were submitted to City Council in October 2001 and approved in February 2002.

In 2009, the Mapping L.A. project of the Los Angeles Times gave the same area a different name: Gramercy Park. In 2021, the Southwest Neighborhood Council stated that the two different names caused confusion and asked residents which name they preferred. By 2022, however, the Times was using the city designation of West Park Terrace.

== Geography ==
The 1.13-square-mile (2.9 km^{2}) West Park Terrace neighborhood is bounded by Manchester Boulevard on the north (from Van Ness Avenue to Vermont Avenue), Vermont Avenue on the east (from Manchester Avenue to the City of Los Angeles boundary), City of Los Angeles boundary on the south (from Vermont Avenue to Van Ness Avenue) and Van Ness Avenue (from Manchester Avenue to the City of Los Angeles boundary).

At that time, the Department of Transportation was directed to install neighborhood signs at the following locations: Vermont Avenue at Manchester Avenue, Manchester Avenue at South Van Ness Avenue and Van Ness Avenue at West 89th Street.

According to Mapping L.A., the West Park Terrace neighborhood is bounded by Manchester Boulevard on the north, Normandie Avenue and the Los Angeles city line on the east, and the Los Angeles city border on the south and west.

== Population ==
=== 2000 ===
A total of 10,047 people lived in the neighborhood's 1.13 square miles, according to the 2000 U.S. census—averaging 8,859 people per square mile, about an average population density in both the city and the county. In 2008 the city estimated its population had grown to 11,173.

The median age was 36, considered old for the city but about average for the county, and the percentages of residents aged 50 and older was among the county's highest.

Within the neighborhood, African Americans made up 86.4% of the population—the highest percentage among Los Angeles County neighborhoods or cities—and Latinos made up 11.5% of the population. Other ethnicities were white, 0.8%; Asian, 0.4%; and other, 0.9%. Mexico and Jamaica were the most common places of birth for the 9.3% of the residents who were born abroad, a low percentage of foreign-born when compared with the city or county as a whole.

Jamaican and Unspecified African were the most common ancestries. Mexico and Jamaica were the most common foreign places of birth.

=== 2008 ===
The median household income in 2008 dollars was $57,983, considered average for both the city and county. The percentage of households earning $40,000 to $60,000 was high, compared to the county at large. The average household size of 2.8 people was about average. Homeowners occupied 70.4% of the housing units, and renters occupied the rest.

The percentages of divorced and widowed people were among the county's highest, and there were 562 families headed by single parents, or 21.9%, a rate that was among the county's highest.

There were 939 veterans, or 13.1% of the population, considered high compared with the city and the county overall.

Residents aged 25 and older holding a four-year degree amounted to 14.9% of the population, an average percentage for both the city and the county. The percentage of residents of that age having some college education was considered high.

== Education ==
The Los Angeles Unified School District operates the following public schools within the boundaries of West Park Terrace:

- La Salle Elementary School – 8715 La Salle Avenue
- Manhattan Place Elementary School – 1850 West 96th Street

== Recreation and parks ==
- Saint Andrews Recreation Center – 8701 Saint Andrews Place.
- Jesse Owens Community Regional Park – 9651 S. Western Avenue. Formerly named "Sportsman Park", it was renamed after Jesse Owens. The park is a 20-acre (8.1 ha) facility that provides recreational activities including baseball, flag football, basketball, soccer, tennis and aqua aerobics.

== Development ==
In 2020, CVS Pharmacy announced it would build a new ground-up location in West Park Terrace.
