= Louis Craine =

American serial killer (1957–1989)

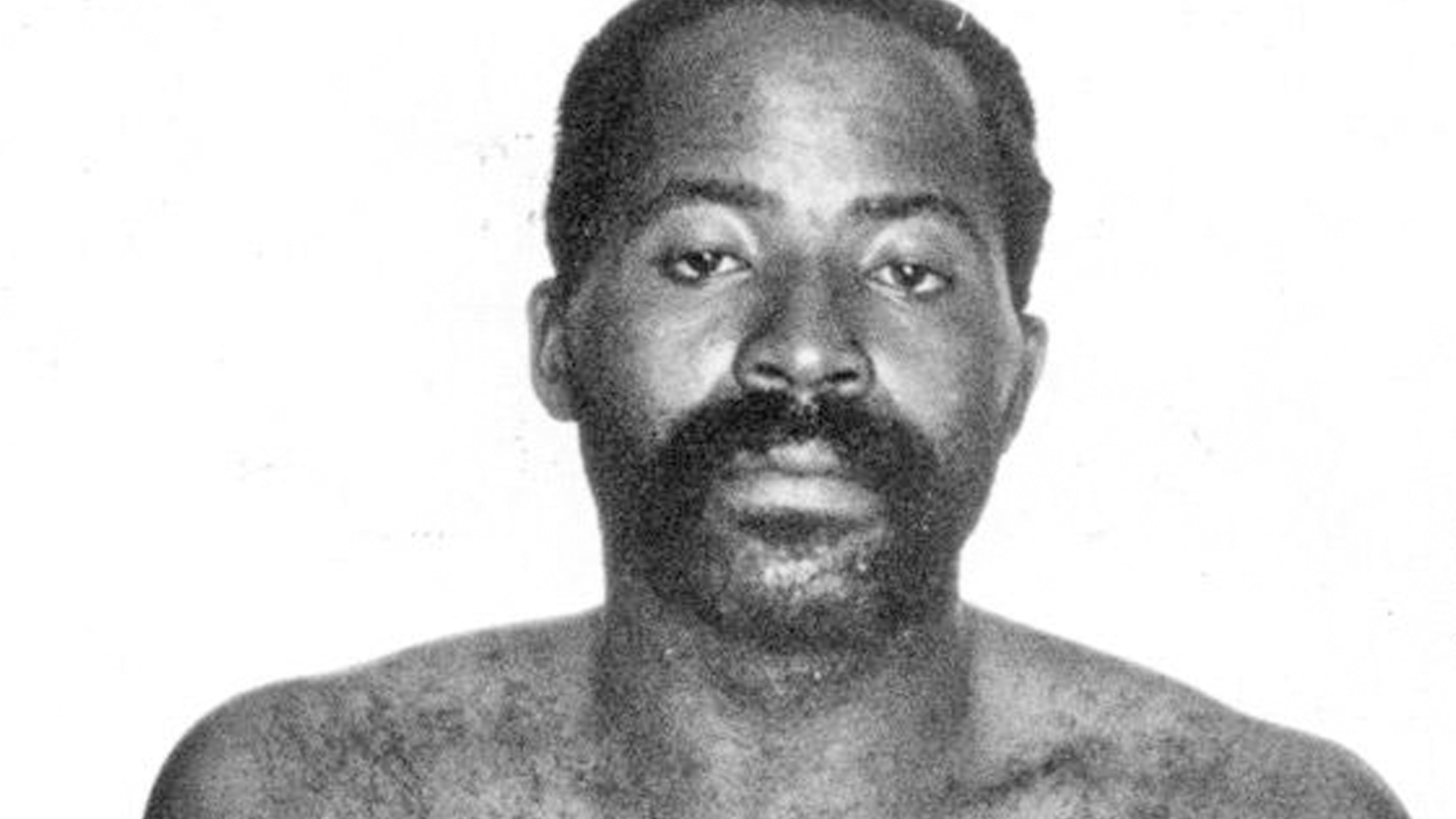
- Mugshot of Craine
- Born: January 6, 1957; Los Angeles, California, U.S.
- Died: November 3, 1989 (aged 32); San Rafael, California, U.S.
- Other name: "The Southside Slayer"
- Conviction: First degree murder with special circumstances (4 counts)
- Penalty: Death

Details
- Victims: 4–5+
- Span of crimes: 1984–1987
- Country: United States
- State: California
- Date apprehended: May 29, 1987

Louis Craine (January 6, 1957 – November 3, 1989) was an American serial killer who committed at least four rape-murders in South Los Angeles, in the period between 1985 and 1987. He was convicted for these crimes in 1989, and was sentenced to death. It was later determined that at least five other serial killers operated in the area during the 1980s and 1990s (collectively known as The Southside Slayers), Craine was suspected of several more murders by police. At the same time, his guilt was controversial, as he was diagnosed with signs of intellectual disability.

== Early life ==
Craine was born on January 6, 1957, in Los Angeles, the third in a family of four children. Early in his school years, he showed signs of intellectual disability. He left school after finishing and passing the 4th grade, entering into social conflict with the rest of his family.

In the early 1970s he left his parents' home and became a vagrant. Without a qualified profession, Craine was forced to engage in low-skilled labor over the next years, and changed several jobs in the construction industry. At the time of his arrest in 1987 he was unemployed.

== Murders ==
Craine was arrested on May 29, 1987, on charges of killing a 29-year-old prostitute named Carolyn Barney. She had been raped and sodomized before being strangled, her corpse found in an empty house, not far from where her parents, and Craine's brother, lived. After finding the body, the police noticed Craine, who, due to the area being cordoned off, was watching their actions, behaving in an inappropriate manner. He was arrested, taken to the police station and subjected to long hours of questioning, during which he confessed to the murder of Barney and two other women: 24-year-old Loretta Perry (killed on January 25) and Vivian Collins (killed on March 18). Both of the women, like Barney, had been strangled and raped before death.

During interrogation, Craine claimed that Collins was murdered by his older brother Roger after they had paid her for sex. According to his story, Roger strangled her while having sex with her; however, relatives, including their mother, provided an alibi for Roger on the day of the murder, which resulted in no charges being brought against him. Subsequently, Craine was charged with the murder of two more women: 24-year-old Gail Ficklin and 30-year-old Sheila Burton, who were killed on August 15, 1985, and November 18, 1984, respectively. Their bodies were also found not far from where other victims' corpses had been located, all of whom were near the house where Craine's parents lived.

== Trial ==
Craine's trial began in early 1989. The main material evidence was a blood-stained shirt, on which was found the blood type of one of the victims. Testimony from Craine's relatives included that of his mother, who told the court that he had repeatedly expressed aggressive behavior towards prostitutes and was spotted in a bloodied shirt after one of the murders. Other evidence pointed to him as well, including his confession of killing Loretta Perry. Initially, it was believed that she had died from a drug overdose, but after Craine's testimony, her body was exhumed and subjected to a thorough pathological study, the results of which validated Craine's claims.

Craine himself, over the course of the trial, insisted on his innocence. He repudiated his earlier testimony, stating that he had been pressured into confessing. He also stated that the bloodied shirt in which, according to his relatives, he had committed the murder, did not even belong to him.

He accused his family of perjury. The lawyers of the defendant insisted that on the basis of various tests, Craine showed signs of intellectual disability, with a threshold of intelligence coefficient of 69 points, a tendency to exaggeration and high susceptibility to suggestions. As a result, they requested a forensic psychiatric examination, but their application was rejected. On May 16, 1989, he was found guilty of four murders and acquitted of Burton's killing; on June 6 of that year, the court sentenced him to death.

== Death ==
After his conviction, Craine was transferred to the San Quentin State Prison to serve his sentence, but due to health problems, he was taken to a prison hospital near the city of San Rafael, where he died on November 3, 1989, from AIDS complications.

== See also ==
- Southside Slayer
- List of serial killers in the United States
