= David Allen Rundle =

American serial killer on death row

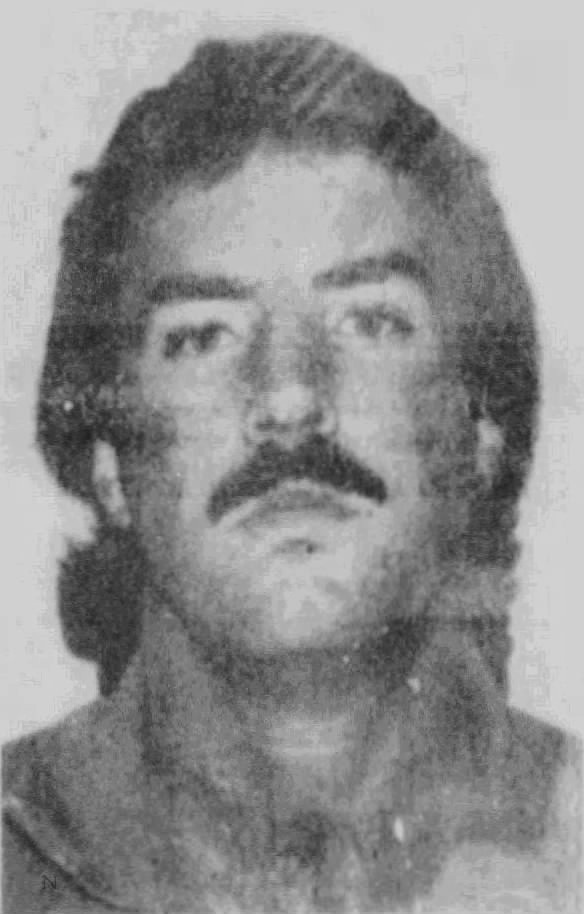
- Mugshot c. 1986
- Born: January 4, 1965 (age 61); Nevada County, California, U.S.
- Convictions: First degree murder with special circumstances (3 counts); Attempted forcible rape (2 counts)
- Penalty: Death

Details
- Victims: 3
- Span of crimes: May – October 1986
- Country: United States
- State: California
- Date apprehended: November 20, 1986
- Imprisoned at: Pelican Bay State Prison

David Allen Rundle (born January 4, 1965) is an American serial killer who raped and strangled to death two women and a teenage girl in the Sacramento Valley region of California between May and October 1986. He was apprehended by police in Nevada and confessed to the murders, ultimately being sentenced to death for two of them and receiving an additional life sentence for the other.

== Early life ==
David Allen Rundle was born in Nevada County on January 4, 1965, the son of chief warrant officer for the United States Navy David William Rundle. His family moved to live in Idaho shortly after he was born, and until he fell into a drug addiction at age 14, Rundle was described as a normal child who enjoyed hunting and fishing. His mother also sexually abused him during his latter teen years. His parents later moved to Georgia, where he attended high school, but dropped out not long after. The family then moved to Colfax, California, where Rundle left his family. In 1984, Rundle got married, but once his wife fell pregnant he abandoned her. Shortly after, he obtained work as a floor installer.

== Murders ==
In May 1986, Rundle, high on marijuana, was prowling around the Sacramento River near an area that had a high population of vagrants. There, he convinced 24-year-old Elizabeth Latorre Lactawen to have sex, and when the two entered a secluded area behind nearby bushes, Rundle strangled Lactawen to death and disposed her body beneath the Pioneer Bridge in Sacramento, where it was found on May 10 by an unidentified person who called into the Secret Witness Program.

In the investigation following her death, a witness to the murder gave a description of the killer and described him as a male, around 17 years old, who was about 5 feet 10 inches tall. A reward of $2,500 was offered to anyone who could identify the killer. On September 7, having traveled to Colfax, Rundle abducted 18-year-old Caroline Marie Garcia from a bus stop as she waited for a bus to Roseville. He drove Garcia to a remote area near Rollins Lake Road where he partially stripped her of her clothes, raped, beat and strangled her to death.

Rundle killed his youngest and final victim on October 7, when he abducted 15-year-old LanciAnne Sorensen. He forced her to take her pants off, which he used to bind her hands behind her back, and then raped and strangled her to death. He left her body along an Interstate 80 off ramp in Loomis.

== Arrest ==
Garcia's bloody clothing was discovered just off of Interstate 80 in Weimer in early September, but her body remained missing. On September 11, as police were scouring Rollins Lake Road searching for clues in Garcia's disappearance, Rundle accidentally rammed his vehicle into the back of a police car, damaging his car but successfully driving away. Police were subsequently able to identify him as the driver and Rundle fled to Carson City, Nevada. There, on November 20, he was arrested and returned to California. A few days after his arrest, Rundle confessed to Garcia's murder and informed detectives that her body was located near Rollins Lake, where police were able to recover it. In addition, he confessed to killing Lactawen and Sorensen. In an interview with detectives, Rundle claimed he was a sick individual and blamed his actions on mental illness and abuse he received as a child, which only got worse with drug and alcohol addiction.

== Trial and imprisonment ==
On April 16, 1987, Rundle was attacked in his sleep by his cellmate Melton Eugene Voight, who was awaiting trial for armed robbery. Rundle was hospitalized for ten days for a skull fracture, while Voight was moved to Folsom State Prison for his violent outburst.

Rundle was sentenced to death in 1989 for the murders of Garcia and Sorensen. At the sentencing phase, the jury was presented with evidence that Rundle was responsible for the rape and murder of Lactawen, raped and threatened to kill three young children, and physically and sexually abused his ex-wife. As the sentence was being handed down multiple jurors were reported crying. He was also given a life sentence for the murder of Lactawen. He is currently incarcerated at Pelican Bay State Prison.

== See also ==
- List of death row inmates in the United States
- List of serial killers in the United States
