= Michael Hughes (serial killer) =

American serial killer (born c.1958)

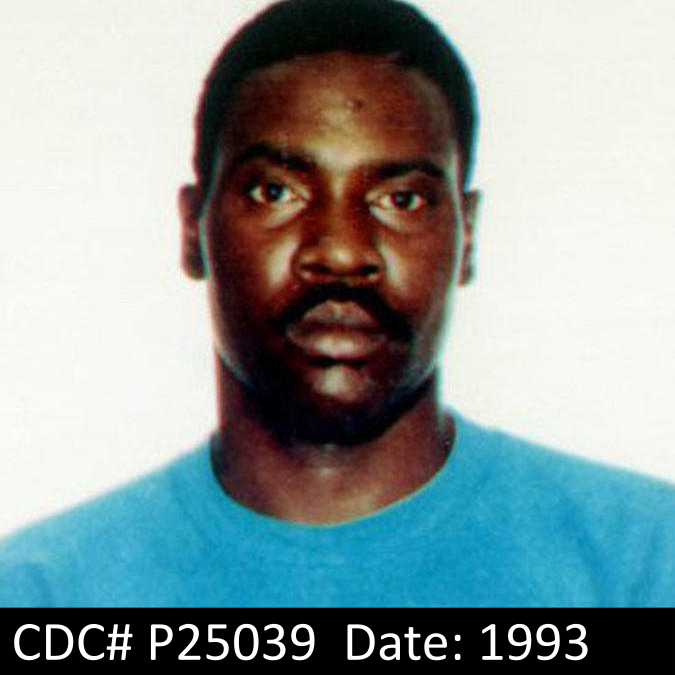
- CDC Inmate mugshot
- Born: Michael Hubert Hughes; 1958 (age 67–68); Michigan, U.S.
- Other name: Southside Slayer
- Conviction: First degree murder with special circumstances (7 counts)
- Penalty: Death sentence (since 2012); Life imprisonment without parole (1998–2012)

Details
- Victims: 7+
- Span of crimes: 1986–1993
- Country: United States
- States: California, possibly Michigan and Maryland
- Date apprehended: 1993
- Imprisoned at: San Quentin State Prison

Michael Hubert Hughes (born c. 1958) is a convicted American serial killer on death row in San Quentin. Hughes was initially sentenced to life without parole for the murders of four women and girls in California. Later, he was convicted of committing three further murders of women, linked to the crimes via DNA profiling. At the second trial, he was sentenced to death.

== Biography ==
Michael Herbert Hughes was born in 1958 in Michigan. Shortly after his birth, his father left the family. At age 5, Hughes, his mother, and his sister moved to California. He grew up in Pasadena then Los Angeles, where he attended Los Angeles High School from 9th to 12th grade.

Hughes came from a dysfunctional family; his mother was an alcoholic who regularly beat him and his sister. When Hughes' sister became pregnant, his mother aborted the baby in front of him. During his teen years, he was hospitalized multiple times for nervous breakdowns. In 1976, at age 17, he enlisted in the Navy, where he worked as a shipmate for a few months, eventually working up to gunner's mate.

After leaving the Navy, Hughes moved back to California, where he lived on the streets, made friends, and sold drugs to support himself. He and his new-found friends moved through Oakland to Long Beach, finally settling in Los Angeles, where Hughes' first confirmed murder took place.

== First trial ==
In December 1993, Michael Hughes, now a security guard, was arrested in Culver City, California. In 1998, he was convicted and given a life sentence without parole for the strangulation murders of Teresa Ballard, Brenda Bradley, Terri Myles and Jamie Harrington.

Ballard, 26, was found in Los Angeles' Jesse Owens County Park on September 23, 1992. The other victims were found dumped in alleys in a Culver City commercial area: 38-year-old Bradley; Myles, 33, found on November 8, 1993; and Harrington, 29, found on November 14, 1993.

== Second trial ==
On July 3, 2008, Hughes was charged with sexually assaulting and strangling two women and two teenage girls in the Los Angeles area between 1986 and 1993 after homicide detectives linked him to DNA samples from the victims using new forensic technologies. The case of Deanna Wilson, 30, who was found in a garage on August 30, 1990, was later dropped but was used by prosecutors to establish Hughes' pattern.

Hughes killed 15-year-old Yvonne Coleman on January 22, 1986. Her body was found in a park in Inglewood, California. The other two were killed in Los Angeles. Verna Williams, 36, was discovered in a stairwell on May 26, 1986. She was considered at the time to be a victim of the prolific, then-unidentified serial killer known as the Southside Slayer (later dubbed the Grim Sleeper, and later still identified as Lonnie David Franklin Jr.). Deborah Jackson, 32, was found on June 25, 1993.

Hughes was convicted in November 2011 and sentenced to death in June 2012 for the murders of Coleman, Williams, and McKinley. Hughes' motion to reduce his sentence to life without parole based on upsetting events from his early life — namely that he was beaten as a child and had watched his mother give his sister an abortion — was denied.

Hughes is awaiting execution on death row at San Quentin State Prison.

== Victims ==
Authorities suspect there may have been other victims. As of 2008, detectives were investigating Hughes' possible involvement in other killings around the United States. While Hughes was in the Navy he spent time in Michigan, San Diego, Long Beach and Frostburg, Maryland.

1. Yvonne Coleman, 15. January 22, 1986.
2. Verna Patricia Williams, 36. May 26, 1986.
3. Deborah Jackson, 30, aka Harriet McKinley. December 1, 1987.
4. Theresa Ballard, 26. September 23, 1992.
5. Brenda Bradley, 38, October 5, 1992. A niece of former Los Angeles mayor Tom Bradley.
6. Terri Myles, 33. November 8, 1993.
7. Jamille Harrington, aka Jamie Harrington. November 14, 1993.

== See also ==
- Southside Slayer
- List of serial killers in the United States
