= Ivan Hill =

American serial killer (born 1961)

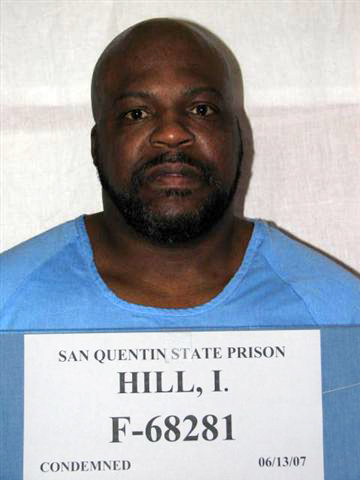
- San Quentin Inmate Photo
- Born: Ivan Jerome Hill; March 30, 1961 (age 65); Los Angeles, California, U.S.
- Other names: "The 60 Freeway Killer" "The Southside Slayer"
- Conviction: First degree murder with special circumstances (8 counts)
- Penalty: Death

Details
- Victims: 9+
- Span of crimes: 1986–1994
- Country: United States
- State: California
- Date apprehended: 2003
- Imprisoned at: San Quentin State Prison, San Quentin, California

Ivan Jerome Hill (born March 30, 1961), known as The 60 Freeway Killer, is an American serial killer who raped and murdered at least eight women in Los Angeles between 1986 and 1994. Hill dumped his victims' corpses along California State Route 60, known as the "East-West Highway", contributing to his nickname. Hill was captured based on DNA profiling nearly a decade after his last murder and was sentenced to death in 2007.

Hill, who also participated in a 1979 murder, is one of six men known for committing The Southside Slayer murders in South Los Angeles; he committed at least one of those killings and investigators suspect he has been involved in more.

== Early life ==
Ivan Hill was born on March 30, 1961, in Los Angeles. Ivan grew up in a socially disadvantageous environment with a father who was aggressive towards his wife and children. On Christmas in 1968, Hill's father shot his mother in the face with a .22 caliber rifle and was sent to prison. Despite the serious injury, Hill's mother survived and later divorced his father. Ivan ended up acting as caregiver to his siblings by the time he was 10.

Hill spent his teens in Pomona, attending Pomona High School. During his school years, Ivan was involved in sports, being elected team captain of the school football team. Most of his acquaintances from those years spoke very positively of him. In 1978, a year before graduation, Hill became addicted to drugs and lost interest in studying. Suffering from financial difficulties, Hill began leading a criminal lifestyle in early 1979, committing several thefts.

== Criminal career ==
In January 1979, Hill, along with accomplices, committed several robberies. On January 23, 17-year-old Hill and his accomplice, 18-year-old Venson Myers, robbed a liquor store in Glendora, during which Myers killed Thomas Leavell and seriously injured Keith Hunt. For this crime, Venson Myers was sentenced to life imprisonment with no chance of parole. As a minor, Hill was found guilty of complicity in murder, but he received a short sentence due to cooperating in the investigation.

During his detention, Hill graduated from high school, receiving his high school diploma. He later studied at one of the local colleges, after which he received parole and was released in the mid-1980s. After his release, Hill spent a lot of time in the San Gabriel Valley, constantly changing his place of residence. He worked as a day laborer, storekeeper, and forklift driver at various times. In the late 1980s, he was rearrested for theft and convicted. Hill was released again in February 1993. Having problems with employment, he was engaged in low-skill labor and soon returned to his criminal lifestyle. In 1993, he committed several additional robberies; he was arrested in early 1994, convicted, and sentenced to 10 years.

== Murders ==
While serving his 1994 sentence, a blood sample was taken from Hill. He was due to be released in February 2004. In March 2003, Hill's DNA test showed his profile corresponded to that of an unidentified serial killer, who had left DNA evidence during attacks on women in different suburbs in Los Angeles County from November 1993 to January 1994 and in February 1986 and 1987.

Lorna Patricia Reed
On February 11, 1986, the body of Lorna Reed, 35, was found strangled in an isolated area of Frank G. Bonelli Regional Park. Reed, a sex-worker, was considered to be the 16th victim in a string of similar murders.

Rhonda Jackson
On January 26, 1987, Rhonda Jackson's nude body was found in dumpster in Palomares Park in Pomona. Like Reed, she had been strangled.

Betty Sue Harris
On November 1, 1993, Betty Harris, 37, was found strangled to death behind an industrial building in Diamond Bar. Harris was a former student of Chaffey College and had grown up in Pomona. She was dying of cancer and, after spending time in jail for petty crimes, had resolved to spend the time she had left being a good mother.

Roxanne Brooks Bates
On November 5, 1993, Roxanne Bates, also known as Roxanne Brown, 31, was found strangled, with either a cord or cloth, in Chino. Bates, of Montclair, was a sex worker in the Los Angeles area; she was convicted twice for prostitution in 1991, and twice more the year she was murdered.

Helen Ruth Hill
On November 14, 1993, the body of Helen Hill, also known as Helen Rudd, 36, was found dumped in an industrial complex parking lot in the City of Industry. Her hands were bound behind her back, her mouth was taped, and she had been strangled with two cloths. She was on probation for a drug violation at the time of her murder, but her West Covina roommate described her as being a devoted mother and caretaker to her elderly mother.

Donna Goldsmith
On November 16, 1993, Donna Goldsmith, 35, of West Covina, was found strangled in an industrial area of Pomona. A strip of duct tape with a lipstick stain was found in a trash bin near her body; a piece of rope, shoelaces, and a sheet of black fabric were used to strangle her. Goldsmith was a wife and mother of three children, and worked as a medical technician before descending into a downward spiral of addiction and petty crime. She had been arrested earlier that year for shoplifting just a few blocks from where her body was found.

Cheryl Sayers
On December 30, 1993, Cheryl Sayers, 34, was found strangled in Ganesha Park in Pomona; her neck, wrists, and ankles were bound.

Deborah Denise Brown
On January 12, 1994, the body of Deborah Brown, 33, was found strangled, with piece of blue fabric around her neck, in San Antonio Park in Ontario. Like other victims, Brown had a history of sex work.

== Trial ==
The trial of Ivan Hill began on October 23, 2006. On the first day of his trial, gruesome images of the victims presented on a giant screen caused women to run out of the courtroom. Voice recordings of Hill's taunting phone calls to police were played. "I did it again," Hill said during a phone call immediately following the murder of Deborah Brown. "What's this, number five, number six? I forget, but she's there." Minutes later he called back, "Y'all better catch me before I kill again." On November 17, 2006, Hill was convicted on six counts of murder for the slayings that occurred between 1993 and 1994.

During the sentencing phase of his trial, Hill's mother testified, hoping for leniency, to the physical and mental abuse he endured at the hands of his father. Despite this, on January 2, 2007, a jury ordered the death penalty for Hill, and on March 21, 2007, a judge upheld his sentence.

On May 15, 2009, Hill pleaded guilty to the murders of Lorna Reed in 1986 and Rhonda Jackson in 1987.

As of November 2019, the 58-year-old Hill is still alive and awaiting execution on San Quentin State Prison's death row.

As of May 2024, the 63-year-old Hill is still alive but has been transferred to the California Health Care Facility in Stockton.

== See also ==
- Southside Slayer
- List of death row inmates in the United States
- List of serial killers in the United States
