= Chester Turner =

American serial killer (born 1966)

- Chester Turner's mugshot
- Born: Chester Dewayne Turner; November 5, 1966 (age 59); Warren, Arkansas, U.S.
- Other name: "The Southside Slayer"
- Convictions: First degree murder with special circumstances (15 counts; 1 later overturned)
- Penalty: Death

Details
- Victims: 15–16+
- Span of crimes: 1987–1998
- Country: United States
- States: California (known); Utah (alleged)
- Date apprehended: September 30, 2003

Chester Dewayne Turner (born November 5, 1966) is an American serial killer and sex offender who was sentenced to death for sexually assaulting and murdering fourteen women and an unborn baby in Los Angeles between 1987 and 1998.

Turner spent much of his adult life homeless prior to his capture. He spent some time in prison for unrelated crimes during his murder spree. In 2002, Turner was sentenced to eight years in prison for raping a woman earlier that year. While incarcerated, DNA analysis implicated Turner in numerous unsolved murders and rapes. He was sentenced to death in July 2007 for ten murders, and sentenced to death again in June 2014 for an additional four murders. He was also found guilty of the death of the unborn child of one of his victims. Prosecutors have called Turner "one of the most prolific serial killers in the city's history".

Before Turner's identification, the killer was nicknamed "The Southside Slayer", a name also used for several other serial killers active in Los Angeles around the same time as Turner.

On June 14, 2024, Turner was charged in the 1998 murder of Itisha Camp in Salt Lake City, Utah.

== Personal life ==
Turner was born on November 5, 1966, in Warren, Arkansas. He moved to Los Angeles with his mother when he was five years old after his parents separated. He attended public schools in Los Angeles and attended Locke High School until dropping out. Working for Domino's Pizza as a cook and delivery person as a young man, he lived with his mother until she moved to Utah. After that, he moved around to different homeless shelters and missions. In 1992, Turner began dating Felicia Collier, with whom he had one child. Turner has fathered a total of four children with separate women, some of whom were raised by his mother after his arrest.

Turner was jailed multiple times in the 1980s and 1990s for theft and drug possession, first from 1987 to 1989, then 1989 to 1992, and from 1993 to 1995. In 1995, he was arrested (and later convicted) for car theft. He was then jailed for assault on an officer and cruelty to an animal on April 9, 1997.

== Murders ==
DNA evidence has linked Turner to the murders of 14 women, most of which occurred in a four-block-wide corridor that ran on either side of Figueroa Street between Gage Avenue and 108th Street and several outside this corridor in Los Angeles County.

=== 1987–1989: First set of murders ===
Turner's first confirmed murder victim was 21-year-old Diane Johnson. Her body was found on March 9, 1987, by two passing motorists in a roadway construction area west of the harbor. She had been raped, strangled, and stripped of her clothes.

In June 1987, the body of 33-year-old Elandra Joyce Bunn was found nude lying in a pile of trash. Her body had been discovered by 11-year-old Alvin McThomas. An autopsy showed that Bunn sustained battered and bloody eyes, abrasions and lacerations on her head and neck, and bruises on her neck and torso. On October 29, 1987, the body of 26-year-old Louisiana native Annette Ernest was found lying on a shoulder of a road, partially nude and strangled. She was the daughter of Mildred White, who was friends with Jerri Johnson Tripplett, mother of Turner's fifth victim, Andrea Tripplett.

No other murders that are linked to Turner occurred in 1988. In January 1989, the partially nude body of 31-year-old Anita Fishman Breier was discovered outside a garage in an alley off Figueroa Street. Her nephew described her as "upbeat, happy". Her sister, Suzanne, was trying to help her through her struggle with addiction. On September 23, 1989, the partially nude and strangled body of 27-year-old Regina Nadine Washington was found inside a garage off Figueroa Street. Washington was six months pregnant, and the death of the fetus, referred to as "Baby Washington", was attributed to the mother's strangulation and was ruled a homicide.

=== 1992–1993: Second set and wrongful conviction ===
On November 16, 1992, the seventh known victim, 32-year-old Debra Williams, was found dead in the 400 block of West 98th Street in Vermont Vista. A month later, on December 16, the body of 41-year-old Mary Edwards was found on the 9700 block of South Figueroa Street in Vermont Vista.

In April 1993, the strangled and partially nude body of 29-year-old Andrea Tripplett was discovered behind a vacant building on Figueroa Street. Although she was 5 1/2 months pregnant, at the time, California law did not consider the fetus viable, so Turner was not charged with its murder. A month later, on May 16, 1993, the body of 29-year-old Desarae Ellemae Jones was also found strangled and partially nude in a backyard. Her brother Frank described her as "smart, outgoing, and funny" and stated that before succumbing to her addiction, she worked at a rest home for the elderly.

David Allen Jones, a part-time janitor, was arrested for the murders of Williams and Edwards, along with a third murder, that of Tammie Christmas. Jones, who was barely literate, was questioned without an attorney and admitted using drugs with the victims in the areas where their bodies were found. Jones was convicted of the murders in 1995 and was sentenced to 36 years to life in prison. Jones had also been convicted of a rape unrelated to the murders during his trial.

=== 1995–1998: Final murders ===
On February 12, 1995, the nude body of 31-year-old Natalie Joan Price was found next to a vacant residence in Vermont Knolls. She had been strangled to death. On November 6, 1996, the body of 45-year-old Mildred Williams Beasley was found partially nude and strangled amongst the bushes alongside the 110 Freeway. Beasley, originally from Michigan, was married and had a teenage son. In February 1997, 30-year-old Cynthia Annette Johnson was found strangled to death in the Green Meadows neighborhood of South Los Angeles. On February 3, 1998, 38-year-old Paula Donnell Vance was found in the Olympia Tool business in Azusa. Portions of her murder were taped by five nearby security cameras, with the killer visible in several frames as a "dark shadow and little more". One camera that police confiscated would have filmed the killer's face but it cut away moments before he was in frame. Vance suffered from mental illness and was transient.

On April 6, 1998, the body of the final victim, 39-year-old Brenda Bries, was found strangled in a portable toilet near Little Tokyo. She was found just 50 yards (46 m) away from the hotel where Turner was staying at the time.

== Arrest and exposure ==
By March 2002, Turner was working as a security guard at a downtown Los Angeles homeless shelter. That same month, he sexually assaulted 47-year-old Maria Martinez. He had approached Martinez before the attack to ask to borrow a cigarette lighter and proceeded to grab her neck and rape her for approximately two hours and threatened to kill her if she told the police. Turner pled no contest to rape later that year and was sentenced to eight years in prison. He was incarcerated at Sierra Conservation Center in Tuolumne County.

Turner was required to give a DNA sample to California's Combined DNA Index System (CODIS) as part of his prison term. In September 2003, based on that sample, Turner was identified as a match for DNA recovered from the murders of Vance and Bries; after that, detectives began an examination of Turner's background. By October 2004, ten more unsolved murders of women were matched to Turner using DNA evidence.

Turner was arraigned on December 22, 2004, on ten murder charges and pleaded not guilty.

=== Overturning of Jones' convictions ===
During the investigation of these cases, detectives also reviewed similar solved cases. In doing so, the detectives found that David Allen Jones, now 44, had been convicted of the 1992 murders of Tammie Christmas, Debra Williams, and Mary Edwards; the later two had now been linked to Turner via DNA.

Rather than using these convictions as a basis for excluding Turner, the detectives re-evaluated the physical evidence. The detectives found that Jones' 1995 trial had relied upon other evidence, including Jones' coerced statements to police, instead of DNA analysis. At the detectives' request, the LAPD Crime Laboratory processed the available evidence using the latest DNA applications. Although DNA analysis could not be used to reinvestigate the Christmas murder, prosecutors and police are confident that Jones is innocent of the Christmas murder and that Turner is the likely culprit.

Jones had also been convicted of a rape unrelated to the murders during his trial, which he had served out his sentence for. The new investigation revealed that the blood typing evidence did not match the blood types found in the crimes for which he spent eleven years in prison, and he was acquitted as a murderer. Jones was released from prison in March 2004 and filed a lawsuit against the City of Los Angeles. Jones was awarded $720,000 in compensation.

== Convictions ==
Turner was convicted of eleven murders on May 10, 2007, and sentenced to death on July 10, 2007.

In February 2011, Turner was charged with four additional murders, those of Cynthia Johnson, Elandra Bunn, Mary Edwards, and Deborah Williams. Authorities said that DNA linked Turner to the killings. On June 19, 2014, Turner was convicted of those murders and received another death sentence on June 26, 2014.

The California Supreme Court heard a September 2020 automatic appeal in the case. On November 30, 2020, the California Supreme Court reversed Turner's murder conviction for the unborn baby. However, the death sentence for the other 14 victims was upheld.

He is currently on death row at San Quentin State Prison.

== Television ==
- In 2019, the Investigation Discovery show Evil Lives Here detailed Turner's crimes in season 5, episode 6, "I Was His First Victim".
- The show World's Most Evil Killers profiled the case in season 6, episode 9.
- Turner was profiled on episode 2 of the show 35 Serial Killers the World Wants to Forget (2018).
- Season 2, episode 8, of Very Bad Men covers Turner.

== See also ==
- Southside Slayer
- List of serial killers in the United States
- List of serial killers by number of victims
