= Daniel Lee Siebert =

American serial killer (1954–2008)

Daniel Siebert
- Born: Daniel Lee Siebert; June 17, 1954; Mattoon, Illinois, U.S.
- Died: April 22, 2008 (aged 53); Holman Correctional Facility, Atmore, Alabama, U.S.
- Other name: The Southside Slayer
- Convictions: Nevada; Manslaugter; Alabama; Capital murder (5 counts)
- Penalty: Nevada; 10 years Alabama; Death

Details
- Victims: 10–12
- Span of crimes: 1979–1986
- Country: United States
- States: Alabama, California, Nevada, New Jersey
- Date apprehended: 1986

Daniel Lee Siebert (June 17, 1954 – April 22, 2008) was an American serial killer on Alabama's death row. He was convicted of five murders and confessed to at least four more. During questioning he indicated that he was responsible for at least 12 deaths. Siebert died on April 22, 2008, in Holman Prison near Atmore of complications from cancer.

== Killings ==
Siebert's first known killing took place in Las Vegas, Nevada. He was convicted of manslaughter.

Siebert was charged with the 1985 murders of Gidget Castro, 28 and Nesia McElrath, 23 in Los Angeles, California.

In 1986, he murdered a student at the Alabama Institute for the Deaf and Blind in Talladega, Alabama, and her two children. Sherri Weathers had missed classes for more than a week, and the school had worried that she had not contacted them with an explanation. A search of her apartment resulted in police finding her dead body, along with those of her two children.

Investigation also revealed another student who was missing from the institute. Linda Jarman was found dead in her apartment, also murdered. He was also charged with the murder of Linda Odum, a waitress he had been dating. She was reported missing in February and her remains discovered in March. Fingerprints linked Siebert to her stolen car. Police believed Siebert was also involved in the death of Sheryl Evans of Calhoun County, Alabama, whose body was found around the same time. Siebert was charged with the death of Beatrice McDougall in Atlantic City, New Jersey, in 1986. In custody, Siebert said he had committed 12 or more murders.

== Discovery ==
An art teacher using the name "Daniel Spence" was questioned in connection with the crime after police were notified that he had an interest in Sherri Weathers. A check of Spence's fingerprints revealed that he was in fact Daniel Siebert, who had a previous conviction of manslaughter in 1979 and was wanted on assault charges in San Francisco.

Siebert spent the next six months on the run. He was apprehended in Hurricane Mills, Tennessee, after placing a phone call to a friend who reported him to the police. His next call was traced to a phone booth near a restaurant where he was working and he was arrested the following day when he showed up for work.

== Imprisonment and death ==
Siebert was convicted in the capital cases involving Jarman, and the case of Weathers and her children. Siebert's execution date was set for October 25, 2007, for the murders of Weathers and her children. Assistant Attorney General Clay Crenshaw said Siebert had exhausted all of his appeals for the killing of Weathers and her children. Siebert had been undergoing treatment for pancreatic cancer. Siebert's execution was delayed hours before it was to occur. Siebert received death sentences for the murders of Jarman, Weathers and her children Chad and Joey, ages five and four respectively. He was additionally sentenced to life for Odum's murder. Siebert was previously sentenced to 10 years for manslaughter in Nevada where he stabbed his lover 29 times.

He had the Alabama Institutional Serial #00Z475.

Siebert died on April 22, 2008, in Holman Prison near Atmore of complications from cancer.

== See also ==
- Southside Slayer
- List of serial killers in the United States
- List of serial killers by number of victims
