= Roger Kibbe =

American serial killer (1939–2021)

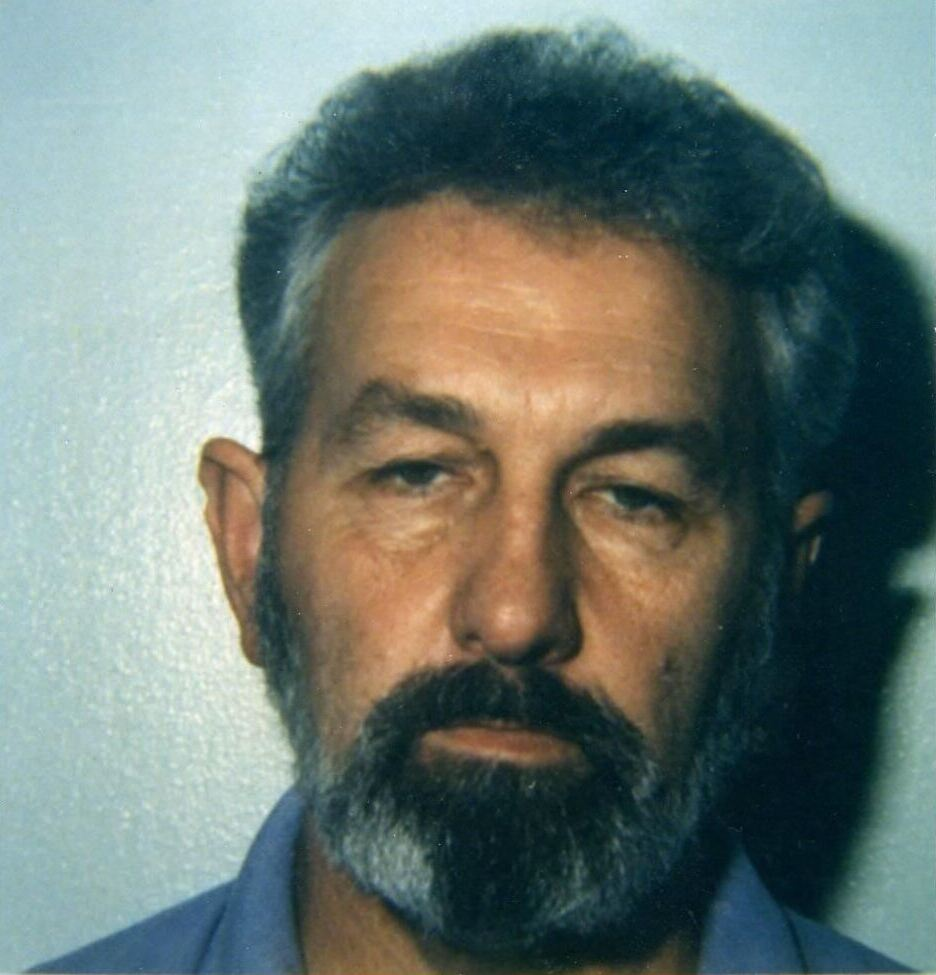
- Kibbe in a 1988 mugshot
- Born: Roger Reece Kibbe; May 21, 1939; San Diego County, California, U.S.
- Died: February 28, 2021 (aged 81); Mule Creek State Prison, Ione, California, U.S.
- Cause of death: Homicide by strangulation
- Other name: I-5 Strangler
- Occupation: Former Furniture salesman
- Status: Deceased
- Convictions: First degree murder (1 count; March 18, 1991); First degree murder with special circumstances (6 counts; November 5, 2009)
- Penalty: 6 life sentences without parole plus 25 years

Details
- Victims: 8+ (7 convicted)
- Span of crimes: 1977–1987
- Country: United States
- State: California

Roger Reece Kibbe (May 21, 1939 – February 28, 2021) was an American serial killer and rapist known as the "I-5 Strangler". Kibbe found all but one of his victims on freeways around Sacramento, California. In 1991, he was sentenced to 25 years to life imprisonment for the death of Darcie Frackenpohl.

== Criminal investigation and incarceration ==
Kibbe was first arrested for assault and battery in 1987 after attempting to handcuff prostitute Debra Ann Guffie. Guffie fought back and a police officer heard her screaming. With Guffie's testimony, Kibbe was convicted and sentenced to 8 months in jail, during which time police put together the murder case against him.

Kibbe was arrested in 1988 for murdering Darcie Frackenpohl the previous year. On March 18, 1991, he was convicted of first degree murder and sentenced to 25 years to life in prison. In 2003, he accompanied prosecutors and detectives to a dry creek he remembered to try to find the body of Lou Ellen Burleigh, whom he had killed in 1977. In 2007 a detective searched the area again. In 2009, Kibbe again returned to the site with detectives. Burleigh's body was not found, and a grand jury was convened.

After a plea bargain to avoid the death penalty, on November 5, 2009, Kibbe pleaded guilty to the murders of six other women and was sentenced to six additional life sentences.

In 2011, a detective returned to the Burleigh dump site on his own and found a bone in the creek. DNA testing proved it to be Burleigh's. Burleigh had left her Walnut Creek, California, home in 1977 for a job interview, but never returned.

Kibbe kidnapped his victims, tied them up with parachute rigging cord and silenced them with duct tape. He then proceeded to cut open their clothes in irregular shapes with scissors that had belonged to his mother. Sometimes he garroted his victims with the parachute cord with which he skydived. Then, he raped them and strangled them to death. Kibbe also cut off most of the hair of his victims to remove the duct tape before leaving the scene of the crime.

== Death ==
Kibbe died at approximately 12:40 a.m. on February 28, 2021, in Mule Creek State Prison.

An officer made the discovery; Kibbe's cellmate, Jason Budrow, 40, was present at the scene. Budrow, a self-avowed Satanist who was serving a life sentence for the 2010 strangling death of 48-year-old Margaret Dalton, claimed he had murdered Kibbe to avenge his victims. He was charged with first degree murder with special circumstances for killing Kibbe, albeit prosecutors did not seek a death sentence against him. Budrow was given a second life sentence for Kibbe's murder and is currently charged with the August 2023 attack on Paul Flores, who was the murderer of Kristin Smart.

On March 3, 2021, the Amador County Sheriff's Office released the results of Kibbe's autopsy report, showing that he had died from manual strangulation.

== Known victims ==
- Lou Ellen Burleigh, 21, met Kibbe for an interview on September 10, 1977. She met him again the next morning and never returned home. Kibbe eventually confessed to raping and murdering her, and her body was found approximately 34 years after she disappeared.
- Lora Rena Heedick, 21, was last seen getting into a car with a white, middle-aged man on April 20, 1986. Her body was found near Sacramento on September 6, 1986.
- Barbara Ann Scott, 29, was found strangled beneath a tree on a golf course in Antioch on July 3, 1986.
- Stephanie Marcia Brown, 19, was found sexually assaulted and strangled to death in a drainage ditch in San Joaquin County on July 15, 1986. A pair of unusual scissors were found near her body.
- Charmaine Marie Sabrah, 26, was found strangled on November 9, 1986, in Ione. She was last seen on August 17, 1986, accepting a ride from a stranger after the car she and her mother were in broke down on I-5.
- Katherine Kelly Quinones, 25, was found strangled near the Pope Creek Bridge at Lake Berryessa on December 21, 1986. Her body was identified through fingerprints as Traci Lynn Gobel; one of the 17 aliases used by Quinones.
- Karen Louise Finch, 25, vanished on June 14, 1987. Seven days later, her body was found in a Sloughhouse ditch. She had been sexually assaulted and her throat was slashed; duct tape was found in her hair. Kibbe was not charged with Finch's death.
- Darcie Renée Frackenpohl, 17, a runaway from Seattle, living in Sacramento was found strangled on September 19, 1987, in South Lake Tahoe. She was last seen around August 23, 1987.

== In media ==
Kibbe's forensic evidence used in his conviction is reported on an episode of the series Forensic Files, "Knot for Everyone" (aired: October 1998).

Discovery channel TV show The New Detectives covered the murder of Darcie Frackenpohl in the episode titled Scattered Clues (aired on October 19, 1999).

In 2002 the television show I, Detective aired an episode focusing on the murder of Stephanie Brown.

MSNBC released the documentary "Profiling Evil" where forensic psychiatrist Park Dietz interviews Kibbe in prison (aired: November 18, 2012). The interview was part of Kibbe's plea deal to avoid a death penalty.

The series On the Case with Paula Zahn dedicated an episode on Kibbe's crimes titled "Deadly Offer". The episode aired on May 8, 2016. Series host Paula Zahn interviewed family members of the victims, detectives, criminalist, the prosecutor, and a forensic pathologist.

Australian TV program 35 Serial Killers the World Wants to Forget also look into the case of Kibbe by the perspective of lead detective Ray Biondi (aired on March 6, 2020).

Oxygen Network aired The Mark of a Killer: Pattern of Murder about the Kibbe case on February 17, 2019.

Kibbe was profiled in an episode of Storm of Suspicion on The Weather Channel.

== See also ==
- List of serial killers in the United States
