= Franklin Lynch (serial killer) =

American serial killer on death row

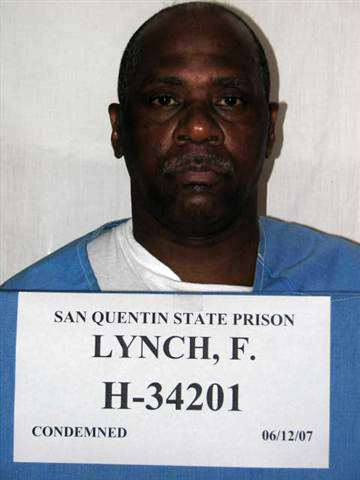
- Born: July 21, 1955 (age 71); California, U.S.
- Other name: "The Day Stalker"
- Conviction: First degree murder with special circumstances (3 counts)
- Penalty: Death; commuted to life imprisonment

Details
- Victims: 3 convicted 13 suspected
- Span of crimes: June – August 1987
- Country: United States
- State: California
- Date apprehended: October 14, 1987

Franklin Lynch (born July 21, 1955) is an American serial killer currently incarcerated at Richard J. Donovan Correctional Facility. He was convicted of the 1987 murders of three elderly women in San Leandro, California, and circumstantial evidence links him to ten further murders, which were colloquially known as "The Day Stalker Murders".

== Biography ==
Lynch was born in 1955. His father had been a supervisor in a machine shop in Oakland before retiring. He had a stable childhood and attended church regularly while growing up. He moved out when he was about 17 years old, got married, and had six children.

In his teenage years, Lynch began taking drugs, which developed into a cocaine addiction. He was arrested multiple times for robbery and had served multiple years in a state prison.

== Investigation ==
In September 1987, the San Leandro Police Department (SLPD) formed their investigation into solving a string of recent brutal attacks and murders targeting elderly women whilst they were in their home. Prior to their investigation, they started examining the details of recent murders to see if they could be connected to any other cases. The investigation began when they came to the conclusion that a serial killer was targeting elderly white women who were either widowed or living alone.

The murders had a pattern: the women would be in their home when an intruder forced himself into the home and attacked the woman, beating them to death. The murders had also all happened in San Leandro.

Despite targeting a certain type of woman, he never sexually assaulted any of them, but money and expensive valuables were taken from the home, and police believed that was the motive for the murders. By early October, the killer was linked to up to 13 murders, with the most recent only being in late August. The killer was also suspected of over two dozen robberies and attacks on elderly women dating back to 1980. The killer was dubbed the Day Stalker due to his nature of striking at around mid-day hours. Victims included Pearl Larson (aged 76), Norma Marglon (aged 78), Adeline Figuerido (aged 89), Anna Constantin (aged 73), Agnes George (aged 74), and Marie Lovardi (aged 82).

In late October, the investigators were notified by neighbors of 32-year-old Franklin Lynch, an ex-convict who had previously served time for robbery and drug charges. Lynch was taken into custody, and after a search of his home, items were found that belonged to Pearl Larson, the first victim of the Day Stalker. In a further search, items were found that belonged to victims Adeline Figuerido and Anna Constantine as well.

== Conviction and later appeals ==
Franklin Lynch was convicted of the three murders and two separate attacks that were non-fatal, and he was sentenced to death in 1992. He was soon transferred to San Quentin State Prison to await his execution.

In 2004, he tried to appeal his sentence, and he argued he should have been able to represent himself. The appeal stated that Lynch's conviction should be overturned, as he claimed there were numerous errors that occurred at trial between the jury and the judge. He also argued that California's death penalty law is unconstitutional and violates international law. However, his appeal was rejected, and as of September 2021, he remained on death row in San Quentin. His death sentence was later commuted to life without the possibility of parole.

== See also ==
- List of serial killers in the United States
