= Joseph Naso =

American serial killer on death row (born 1934)

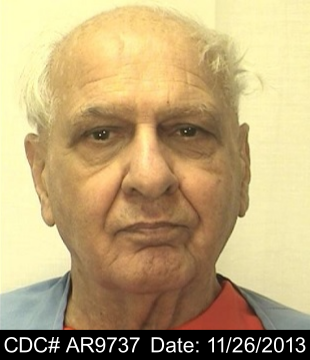
- Naso in 2013
- Born: January 7, 1934 (age 92); Rochester, New York, U.S.
- Other names: Crazy Joe; The Double Initial Killer
- Spouse: Judith Naso (m. 1962; div. 1980)
- Children: 2
- Convictions: First degree murder with special circumstances (4 counts); Theft
- Penalty: Death penalty (de jure)

Details
- Victims: 10–26+
- Span of crimes: January 1974 – August 14, 1994
- Country: United States
- State: California
- Date apprehended: April 11, 2011

Joseph Naso (born January 7, 1934), also known as Crazy Joe or the Double Initial Killer, is an American serial killer and serial rapist sentenced to death for the murders of at least four women.

== Biography ==
Naso was born on January 7, 1934, in Rochester, New York. After serving in the United States Air Force in the 1950s, he met his first wife. Their marriage lasted for eighteen years, but after the divorce, Naso continued visiting his ex-wife, who lived in the San Francisco Bay Area. The couple had a son who later developed schizophrenia, and Naso spent his later years caring for him.

Naso took classes in various San Francisco colleges in the 1970s and lived in the Mission District of San Francisco and then in Piedmont, California, in the 1980s. He lived in Sacramento between 1999 and 2003 and finally settled in Reno, Nevada in 2004, where he was arrested in 2011. He worked as a freelance photographer and had a long history of petty crimes such as shoplifting, which he committed even in his mid-seventies. His acquaintances nicknamed him Crazy Joe for his behavior.

== Victims ==
=== Confirmed ===
- 19-year-old Charlotte Cook was found in January 1974, at Thornton State Beach. She had been strangled before being dumped over a cliff just above a ranger station. She was last seen leaving Oakland, California, to visit her sister in San Francisco.
- On May 20, 1976, 20-year-old Lynn Ruth Connes was last seen alive in Berkeley, California. Naso strangled her, but did not rape her, and late at night he threw her body under a bridge in another city.
- 18-year-old Roxene Roggasch Ashby was found dead on January 10, 1977, her body dumped near Fairfax, California. She had been strangled. Police estimated she was killed less than a day before. Police suspected that Roggasch had worked as a sex worker, but her family denied this.
- October 9, 1977, murder of 19-year-old Pamela "Pam" Lambson, who disappeared after making a trip to Fisherman's Wharf to meet a man who had offered to photograph her.
- Carmen Lorraine Colon, 22-year-old, was found on August 13, 1978, along Carquinez Scenic Highway, a road between Crockett and Port Costa, just thirty miles from the first victim's body. A Highway Patrol officer investigating reports of a cattle shooting found a decomposing nude body that had been dumped. The body was later identified as Colon's.
- On April 1, 1979, 21-year-old Rebecca Jean Dunn went missing. She lived in Las Vegas, Nevada, until 1979, when she traveled to San Diego, California, with another woman and two men. The women planned to earn money from prostitution, and one of the men was to become their pimp.
- The body of Sharileea Patton, 56-year-old, washed ashore near the Naval Net Depot in Tiburon, California on January 14, 1981. She was strangled and stuffed into two garbage bags. At the time of her death, she was a resident of the Bay Area looking for a job. Naso managed the residence where the woman used to live. He also took a photograph of the victim. He was considered the prime suspect by police in 1981 but gave the investigators only elusive answers and was not charged for the next thirty years.
- Sara Dylan, a 38-year-old Bob Dylan groupie (born Renee Shapiro, she later changed her name to that of the singer's former wife), was last seen on her way to a Dylan concert at the Warfield theater in San Francisco in May 1992. She was killed in or near Nevada County, California.
- On September 19, 1993, the body of 38-year-old Pamela Ruth Parsons, a waitress, was found in Yuba County, California. Parsons worked near Cooper Avenue in Yuba City, where Naso lived at that time.
- 31-year-old Tracy Lynn Tafoya was found dead on August 14, 1994, also in Yuba County. The killer drugged, raped, and strangled her and left the body near Marysville Cemetery. It has been estimated that a week passed before the body was found.

=== Suspected ===
- On January 24, 1983, a gardener found a headless and partly decomposed body of an adult woman in Foss Creek behind Simi Winery in Healdsburg, California. Investigators later found a head during a search of the area. On April 28, 2011, her remains were exhumed to extract DNA. However, an identification has not been made and she is known only as the Sonoma County Jane Doe. Links between the victim and Naso were investigated because authorities found a "rape diary" belonging to Naso and one of the entries mentioned a "girl in Healdsburg."
- The police suspect Joseph Naso of a murder that occurred in 1987 and they are trying to close the case.
- Naso was also a person of interest in the unsolved Rochester, New York Alphabet murders case as four of his victims bore double initials, just as four of his California murder victims, and Naso was a New York native who had lived in Rochester during the early 1970s. One of the Rochester victims was named Carmen Colon, the same name as one of Naso's California victims. DNA testing has confirmed Naso's DNA is not a match to the semen samples recovered from the body of victim Wanda Walkowicz.
- Naso was named as a suspect in the Santa Rosa hitchhiker murders, a series of at least seven unsolved homicides and unsolved disappearances all involving young female hitchhikers occurring within Santa Rosa and throughout Sonoma County, in the North Bay area of California, between 1972 and 1973.

== Arrest, trial and conviction ==
Nevada parole and probation authorities arrested Naso in April 2010. While searching his home, authorities discovered a handwritten diary in which Naso listed ten unnamed women with geographical locations. The diary excerpts showed how Naso stalked and sexually assaulted his victims and then photographed them in sexual poses alongside mannequin parts. On April 11, 2011, he was charged with the murders of Roggasch Ashby, Colon, Parsons, and Tafoya. The police listed all four victims as prostitutes. Later, prosecutors Dori Ahana and Rosemary Sloat introduced evidence identifying Patton and Dylan. On August 20, 2013, Naso was convicted by a Marin County jury of the murders. On November 22, 2013, a Marin County judge sentenced him to death for the murders.

== See also ==
- List of serial killers in the United States
- List of serial killers by number of victims
