= Margaret Higgins =

Margaret Higgins may refer to:

- Margaret Higgins (murderer) (1843–1884), Irish serial killer
- Margaret Louise Higgins (known as Margaret Sanger; 1879–1966), American birth control activist
