= Marie Alexandrine Becker =

Belgian serial killer (1879–1942)

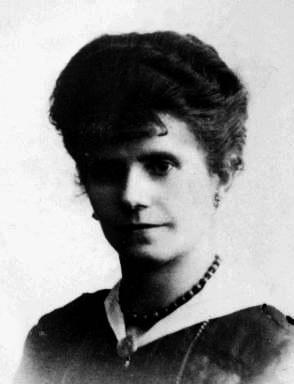
- Marie Becker in 1905 (26 years old)
- Born: Marie Alexandrine Petitjean; 14 July 1879; Waasmont, Landen, Belgium
- Died: 11 June 1942 (aged 62); Forest Prison, Brussels, German-occupied Belgium
- Other names: "The Black Widow" "The Belgian Borgia"
- Conviction: Murder
- Penalty: Life imprisonment

Details
- Victims: 11
- Span of crimes: 1933–1936
- Country: Belgium
- Date apprehended: 16 October 1936

Marie Alexandrine Becker (née Petitjean; 14 July 1879 – 11 June 1942), nicknamed The Black Widow, was a Belgian serial killer who was sentenced to death for poisoning eleven people between 1933 and 1936, and attempting to poison five others. Since capital punishment in Belgium had not been applied since 1863, her sentence was commuted to life imprisonment.

== Biography ==
Marie Petitjean was born in the rural village of Waasmont, Landen municipality. She rarely attended school, having to help her parents in the fields, but nevertheless asked the village priest to teach her writing, reading and arithmetic. At the age of sixteen, she left her family to live with an aunt who ran a rope shop on Saint-Pholien Street in Liège; she often used peket to retain the male clientele. At the age of 17, on 15 August 1896, she met her first lover, a man named Yann, at the Marian feasts in the Outremeuse district. This was the first of a very long series of marriages. In 1900, when she was 21 years old, she began work for a sewing shop. Marie was very passionate about her job and excelled at it. She was considered to be a pretty, lively and joyful woman who pleased the men.

"She offered us something to drink and if we wanted to go further, she never said no. And for no money!"

— Elisabeth Lange, The first serial killer, 3rd Edition, 2011

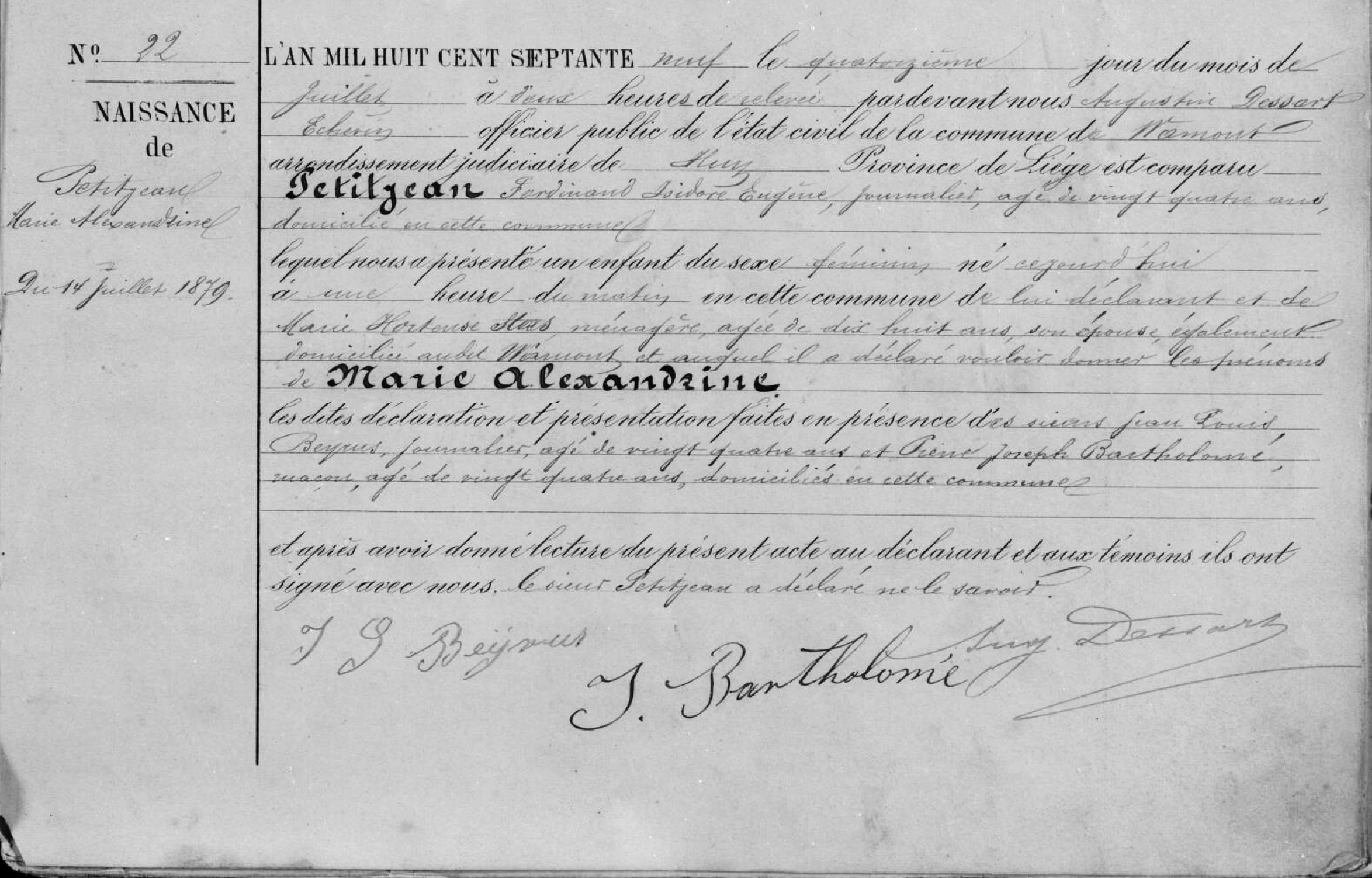
Birth certificate of Marie Alexandrine Petitjean - 14 July 1879

In 1905, at the Universal Exhibition in Liège, she met the man who would become her husband - Charles Becker Sr. At that time, she was climbing the social ladder, going from the status of a saleswoman to managing the fittings in a large fashion store on Pot d'Or Street in Liège. She now had her own home and frequented the wealthy bourgeoisie areas to give her fashion advice.

She married Charles Becker Sr. in 1906, and the couple soon moved into the house adjoined to the family sawmill, where Mr. Becker and his two sons, Charles Jr. and Gustave, worked. Marie, however, did not get on well with the family, and frequently argued with Léontine, Gustave's wife. Angered, the father threatened Charles Jr. to dismiss his daughter-in-law who was a charcuterie in Bressoux. Unbeknownst to the family, the trade was rapidly collapsing. Marie then started to cheat on her husband more often, explaining in her trial that "it is not given to all women to resist the advances of men."

In 1912, Charles Sr. died, which allowed Charles Jr. to resume his duties in the family business. Marie then opened a sewing workshop in one of the rooms of the house, bringing in a growing number of customers. She was heavily inspired by the models of Paul Poiret, even copying some of them.

During the First World War, she courted for the Germans; the sawmill was badly hit but its trade continued to flourish. In 1920, she achieved her long-standing goal of opening a fashion business in Liège on Saint-Léonard Street. Success continued, and she then employed four workers. In 1928, she met a lover to whom Marie became extremely and passionately devoted, Maximilien Houdy, who was twenty years younger. However, the Stock Market Crash of 1929 and the dissoluting morals of Becker put an end to her business, whose bankruptcy was pronounced in 1934.

In October 1932, Charles Becker Jr. died as a result of a cancer. Marie then used some of the acquired money to pay off debts and maintain Houdy. In 1933, she relaunched a seamstress day business for wealthy clients. A friend then suggested to her that she broaden her talents and begin to take care of court ladies. She thus began to frequent near rich ladies-in-waiting, from whom she borrowed money when she did not deprive them of their titles or jewels. It is this that led to her life of big spending.

== The Becker Affair ==
Marie was arrested on 16 October 1936 as she was preparing her 17th poison of digitalis for a woman named Mrs. Lamy. The subsequent investigation shed light on the murders. She was judged on 7 July 1938, and the following day found guilty of eleven murders, five attempted murders, theft and forgery. She was sentenced to death and, as has been the practice since 1863, her sentence was commuted to life imprisonment. Marie Becker died in the Forest Prison during the Second World War on 11 June 1942.

== See also ==
- List of serial killers by country
- List of serial killers by number of victims
- List of serial killers with the nickname “Borgia”

== Literature ==
- Michael Newton: Die große Enzyklopädie der Serienmörder. Sammler Vlg., 2002, ISBN 3-85365-189-5, S. 32.
- Peter & Julia Mirakami: Murakami, Peter; Murakami, Julia (2000). Lexikon der Serienmörder. 10. Auflage. Ullstein. ISBN 978-3-548-35935-9.
- Elisabeth Lange, Marie-Alexandrine Petitjean. Veuve Becker (Belgique, 1879-1942), Éditions Jourdan, 2006
- Albert Bouckaert: Marie Becker the Poisoner, Brussels-Paris, 1938
- Elisabeth Lange, The first serial killer, 3rd Edition, 2011
