= Martha Wise =

American serial killer

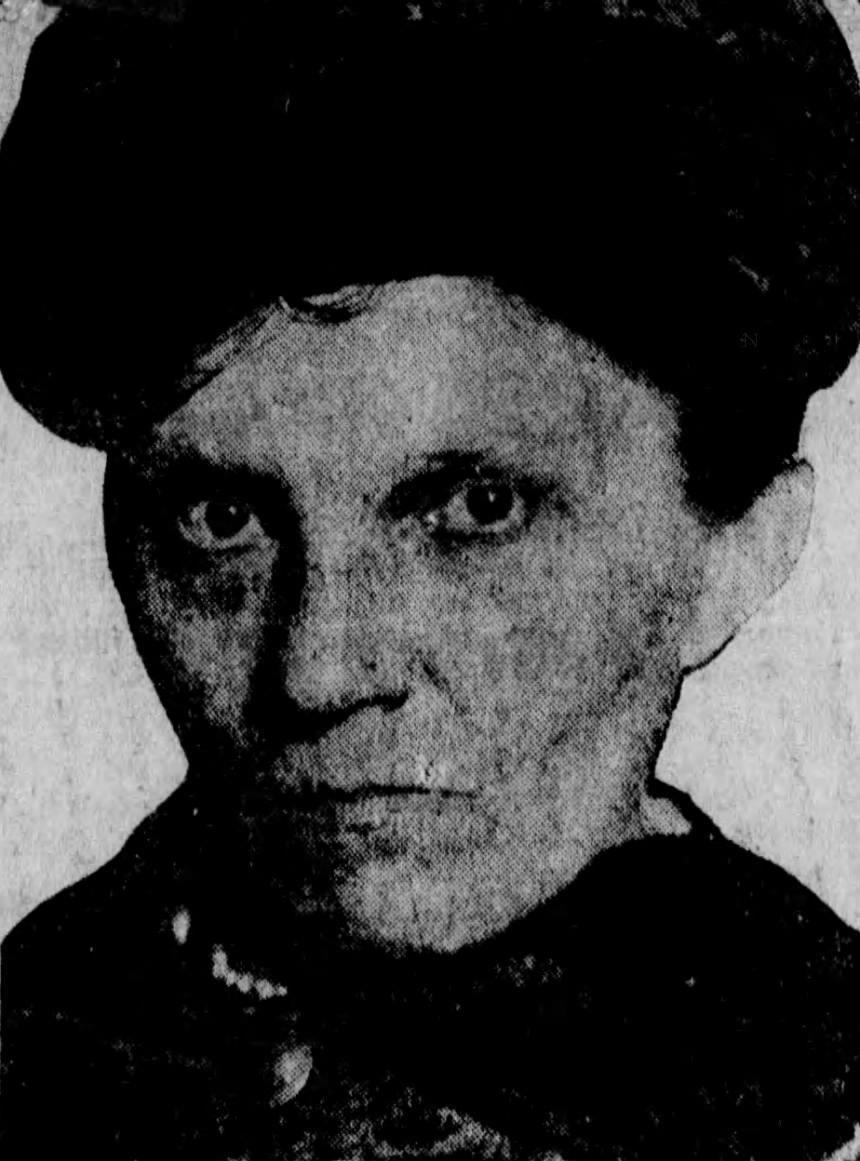
- Wise c. 1925
- Born: Martha Hasel; April 18, 1883; Hardscrabble, Ohio, U.S.
- Died: June 28, 1971 (aged 88); Ohio Reformatory for Women, Marysville, Ohio, U.S.
- Spouse: Albert Wise (his death in 1922)
- Children: 5 (1 died in infancy)
- Conviction: First degree murder
- Penalty: Life imprisonment

Details
- Span of crimes: 1924–1925
- Country: United States
- State: Ohio
- Killed: 3
- Injured: 14
- Weapon: Arsenic
- Date apprehended: 1925; 101 years ago

Martha Wise (née Hasel; April 18, 1883 – June 28, 1971) was an American poisoner and serial killer. After her husband died and her family forced her to end a relationship with a new lover, Wise retaliated by poisoning seventeen family members, of whom three died, in 1924. She was convicted of one of the murders, despite defense claims that she was mentally ill and that her lover had ordered her to poison her family. The case is considered one of the most sensational of the era in Ohio, where it occurred.

== Early life ==
Martha Wise was born in 1883 in Hardscrabble, Ohio, to Sophia Elizabeth Gienke and her husband Wilhelm Carl Hasel, both of whom were farmers. Three brothers and a sister were also born to the family, although contemporary sources name only three siblings, two brothers named Frederick and Paul, and a sister named Emma. In 1906, Martha met the substantially older Albert Wise at a box social; the two were married, though Wise neglected to give her a wedding ring.

The marriage was not happy. Martha moved onto Albert's 50-acre (20 ha) farm, but quickly discovered that he expected a farmhand more than a wife, and life was no less poor as a married woman than it had been when she lived with her parents. Even when pregnant, she was forced to do farm work that was generally male-oriented (such as plowing fields and slopping hogs) as well as the usual household chores of baking and cleaning. The couple's first child, Walter Austin, did not survive infancy; four others, Everett, Gertrude, Kenneth, and Lester, did.

Martha's main source of diversion during this period was funerals; she seldom missed a visit to any funeral held in or near Hardscrabble, whether she had known the deceased or not. When questioned, she simply said that she liked funerals. Albert Wise died suddenly in 1922, leaving his wife a 40-year-old widow with four children. Her odd behavior and fixation on funerals became more noticeable, and she began not only attending funerals, but openly crying and lamenting at them, no matter who had died.

== Deaths ==
Within a year of Albert's death, Martha found new male companionship in the form of Walter Johns, who worked as a farmhand on property adjacent to her farm. The relationship was frowned upon by the Hasel family, and both her mother and her aunt, Lily Gienke, made no secret of their desire for Martha to end the relationship. By the end of 1924, Martha had acquiesced and the relationship ended. Johns moved to Cleveland and the couple lost contact.

On Thanksgiving evening, 1924, several members of the family, including Martha's mother, Sophie, fell ill with a severe stomach ailment. The others recovered shortly, but Sophie's illness worsened, and she died on December 13, 1924. New Year's Eve brought more illness. Lily Gienke, her husband Fred, and several of their children all began suffering stomach pains similar to those Sophie had experienced before her death. Several family members were hospitalized, and Lily and Fred were both dead by February 1925. In total, seventeen relatives were taken ill with similar symptoms in the fall and winter of 1924/1925. Four of the Gienke children were left partially paralyzed from the mysterious illness.

== Investigation ==
It was the devil who told me to do it. He came to me while I was in the kitchen baking bread. He came to me while I was working in the fields. He followed me everywhere.

— Martha Wise

After the deaths of the Gienkes, authorities began to investigate the cluster of deaths. (Note: Sources disagree on what triggered the investigation; the New York Daily News claims a series of unexplained fires raised suspicions, while the Daily Mirror cites reports of foul play by recovered victims of Wise's poisonings.) The sheriff of Medina County, Ohio, Fred Roshon, soon discovered that Martha had signed at a local drug store for a series of purchases of large quantities of arsenic. An autopsy on Lily confirmed the presence of arsenic in her digestive tract. Brought in for questioning by the sheriff on March 19, 1925, Martha at first claimed she had obtained the arsenic to kill rats, but eventually confessed that she had used it to poison family members by putting it in water buckets and coffee pots the family drank out of.

== Trial ==
Despite her confession, Martha pleaded not guilty on March 23, 1925, when she appeared before a grand jury that was considering her indictment for murder in Lily's death. She told the grand jury that she was irresistibly attracted to attending funerals, and that when there were not enough funerals in the community, she was driven to create them by killing. Martha was indicted on a charge of first-degree murder on April 7, 1925.

Martha's trial for murder began on May 4, 1925. She was represented by Joseph Pritchard and prosecuted by Joseph Seymour. Defense claims included that Wise was criminally insane and that she was ordered to commit the murders by her former lover, Walter Johns. A number of setbacks plagued the defense, including the May 6 suicide of Martha's sister-in-law, Edith Hasel, and the subsequent collapse of her husband Fred Hasel, both of whom had been prepared to testify for the defense; the recantation of testimony by a man named Frank Metzger, who told the prosecution on cross-examination that the defense had asked him to perjure himself to support claims that Martha was insane; and her choice to take the stand on her own behalf. Family members including Martha's son, Lester, and three of the Gienkes' children testified against her.

After one hour of jury deliberation, Martha was found guilty of first-degree murder on May 12, 1925. The jury urged mercy in sentencing, and the judge sentenced Martha to life imprisonment, under the terms of which she could only be freed by executive clemency.

== Later life ==
Martha was housed at the Ohio Reformatory for Women in Marysville. She was a model prisoner, and in 1962, as a result of Martha's good behavior in prison, Governor Michael DiSalle commuted her sentence to second-degree murder. She was paroled at age 79. However, Martha's remaining family refused to take her in. A plan to move her to a rest home for the elderly in Union County came unraveled because Wise hadn't been a resident of the county for one year. A southern Ohio home for the age also declined her residency after the owner balked at Martha's reputation. Within three days, Martha returned to prison, lacking anywhere else to go. Her parole and the commutation of her sentence were revoked. Martha died in prison at the Ohio Reformatory for Women on June 28, 1971.

== In media ==
Martha Wise was featured in a 1930 Toledo News-Bee article series profiling "[w]omen who are paying the price for folly, women who gambled against society and lost". A 1962 issue of the St. Joseph Gazette called the Wise case "one of Ohio's most publicized crimes of the era", and she has been labeled the "poison widow of Hardscrabble" and a "poison fiend". Wise's case was covered in a 2008 episode of the Investigation Discovery series Deadly Women.

== See also ==
- List of serial killers in the United States
- List of serial killers with the nickname “Borgia”
