= Borgia (disambiguation) =

The House of Borgia was a Valencian-Italian noble family prominent during the Renaissance.

Borgia or the Borgias may also refer to:

== Places ==
- Borgia, Calabria, Italy
- Zec Borgia, a protected hunting and fishing area in Quebec, Canada

== People ==
=== Criminals ===
- Marie Alexandrine Becker, a.k.a. "The Belgian Borgia"
- Louisa Collins, a.k.a. "The Borgia of Botany"
- Mary Ann Cotton, a.k.a "The English Borgia"
- Mary Cowan, a.k.a. "The Borgia of Maine"
- Mary Frances Creighton, a.k.a. "The Long Island Borgia"
- Catherine Flanagan and Margaret Higgins, a.k.a. "The Borgias of the Slums"
- Anna Marie Hahn a.k.a. "The Blonde Borgia"
- Hannah Hanson Kinney a.k.a. "The Massachusetts Borgia"
- Tillie Klimek, a.k.a "The Polish Borgia"
- Sarah Jane Robinson, a.k.a. "The Boston Borgia"
- Sarah Whiteling, a.k.a. "The Philadelphia Borgia"
- Martha Wise, a.k.a. "The Borgia of America"

=== Other ===
- The Borgia popes, the Popes who belonged to the House of Borgia

== Animals ==
- Borgia (horse), a thoroughbred racehorse

== Art, entertainment, and media ==
=== Film ===
- The Borgia (2006), a Spanish film directed by Antonio Hernández

=== Literature ===
- "The Borgias", a chapter in Celebrated Crimes by Alexandre Dumas

=== Television ===
- Borgia (TV series), also known as Borgia: Faith and Fear, a 2011 French/German historical fiction television series
- The Borgias (1981 TV series), a BBC television serial
- The Borgias (2011 TV series), a Showtime historical fiction television series

=== Sports ===
- Borgia Norrköping BK, bandy club in Norrköping, Sweden
