= Burial of Matî l'Ohê =

Folk festival in Liège, Belgium

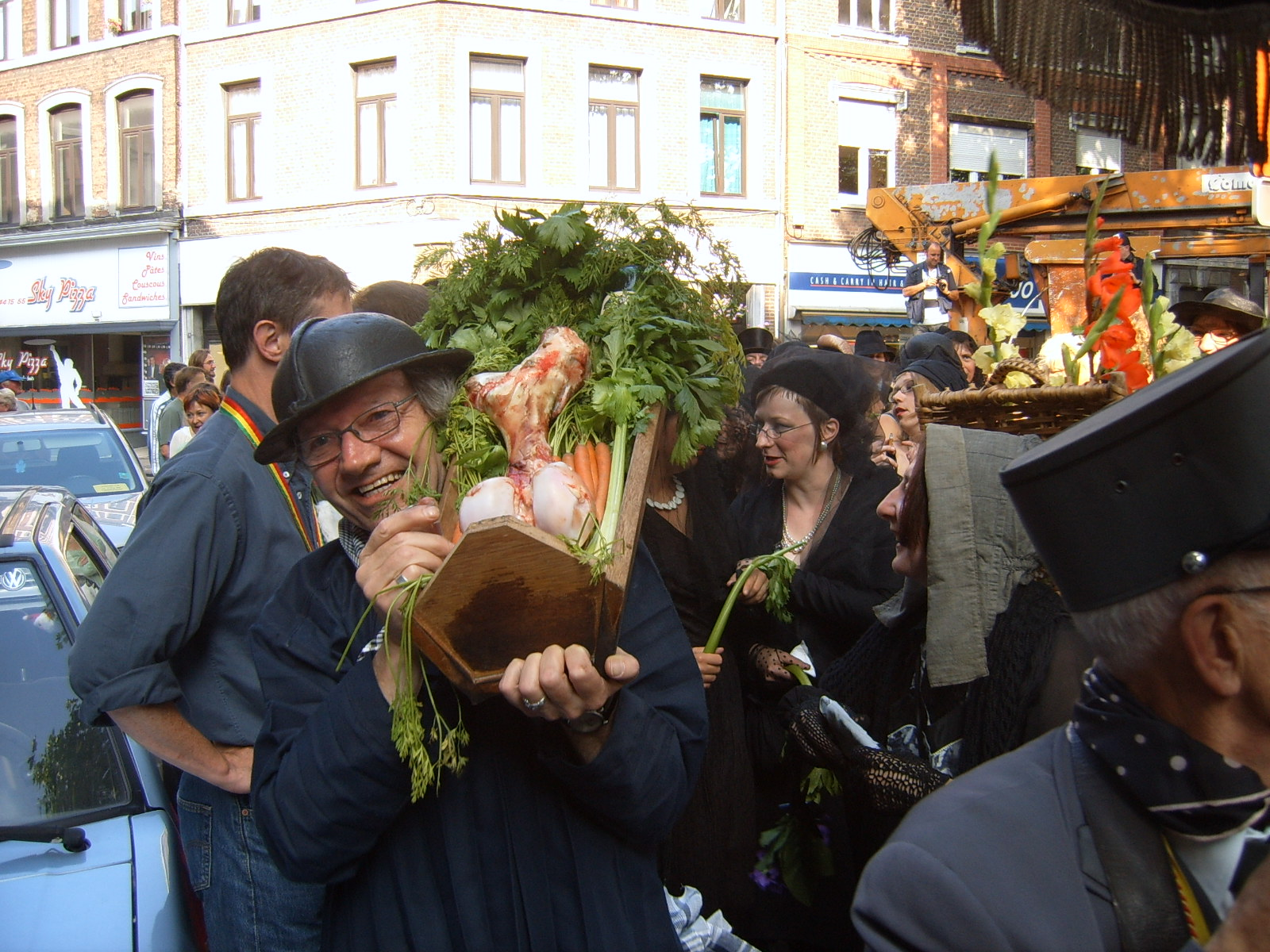
The official bearer of Matî l'Ohê from 1981 to 2012 was Guy Reynarts.

The Burial of Matî l'Ohê ("Matthew the Bone" in Walloon) is a burlesque folk ceremony that concludes Le Quinze Août (the 15 August) festivities in Liège, Belgium. The event blends folklore, religious tradition, and celebration[. The bone symbolises the remains of the festival's feasting: a ham that was steadily consumed throughout the celebrations. After everyone has feasted heartily, only the bone is left, signalling the end of the festivities.

This folk burial takes place in the Outremeuse area of the city on 16 August, the day after the Feast of the Assumption, at 5 p.m. Originally, the celebration was intended for those who had worked during Le Quinze Août festivities.

== Events ==
On the morning of 16 August, the death of Matî is announced, taking everyone by surprise, especially given that he had been seen in excellent health just the day before. His funeral takes place that same day.

=== Visits to the Tchantchès Museum ===
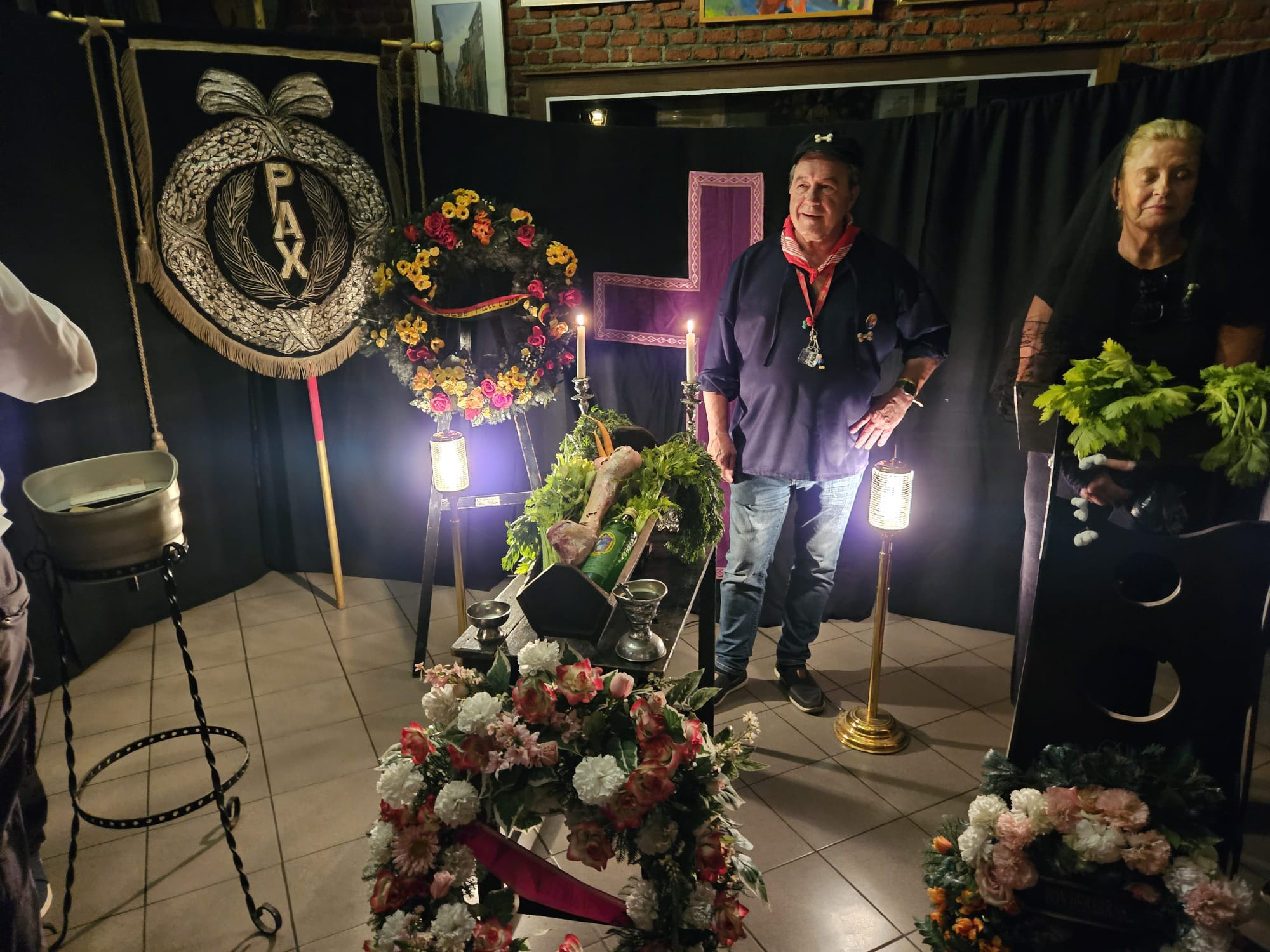
The remains of Matî l'Ohê at the Tchantchès and Nanesse Museum in 2024

From 3 p.m. onwards, everyone is invited to the Tchantchès Museum to pay a final tribute to the deceased; a genuine funeral setting has been arranged for the occasion. Matî lies in his coffin, surrounded by candles and accompanied by the remnants of the festivities: an empty bottle of peket gin, a bunch of carrots, and some celery.

A procession files past the remains, featuring so-called family members in mourning attire, dignitaries in top hats, and numerous professional mourners, usually dressed in Belle Époque or Années folles fashion, who enumerate the countless virtues of the dearly departed. These visits take place under the watchful eye of a fictional, festive clergy, consisting of a bishop surrounded by his acolytes: parish priests and altar boys. They try to lift the spirits of the grieving visitors by offering them a small glass of peket.

=== Procession ===
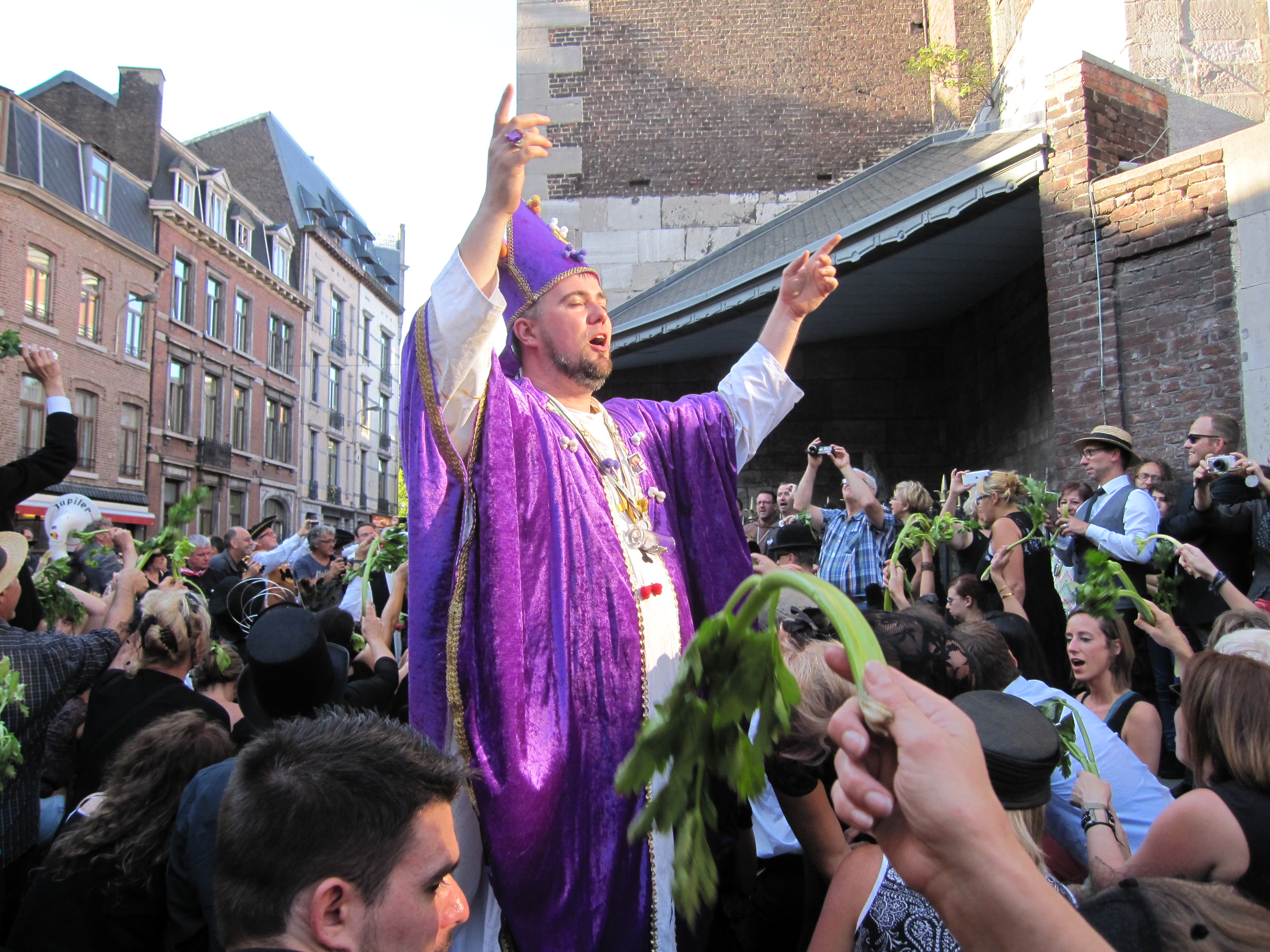
The bishop officiating at Matî l'Ohê's funeral intones the Ave Maria while facing the kneeling crowd.

At 5 p.m. the body is brought out, followed by a funeral procession through the streets of Outremeuse. Leading the way are the ministers of the "Free Republic of Outremeuse", followed in order by a brass band, the clergy, Matî's remains (carried by his bearer), the family, and finally, mourners. The procession winds through the neighbourhood streets accompanied by the band, which alternates between mournful and joyful tunes; during the latter, participants dance in a farandole while waving stalks of celery. This alternation is symbolic: it represents the sadness of seeing the festival end, but also the joy of looking forward to doing it all again the following year.

Along the route, the procession makes several stops at various "watering holes" run by local café owners and supporters. Stops are also made at every wayside shrine encountered along the way; there, the clergy invite the crowd to kneel and sing the Ave Maria, as the Virgin Mary is celebrated throughout Le Quinze Août festivities in Outremeuse.

Wearing mourning attire and carrying a stalk of celery is *de rigueur* for the procession, thereby helping to keep the local tradition alive. A costume theme is usually selected by a small group of enthusiasts near to the clergy. Themes from recent years have included:

- 2022: tram construction work
- 2023: Barbie
- 2024: the Olympic Games
- 2025: Kid Naze

=== Conclusion and cremation ===
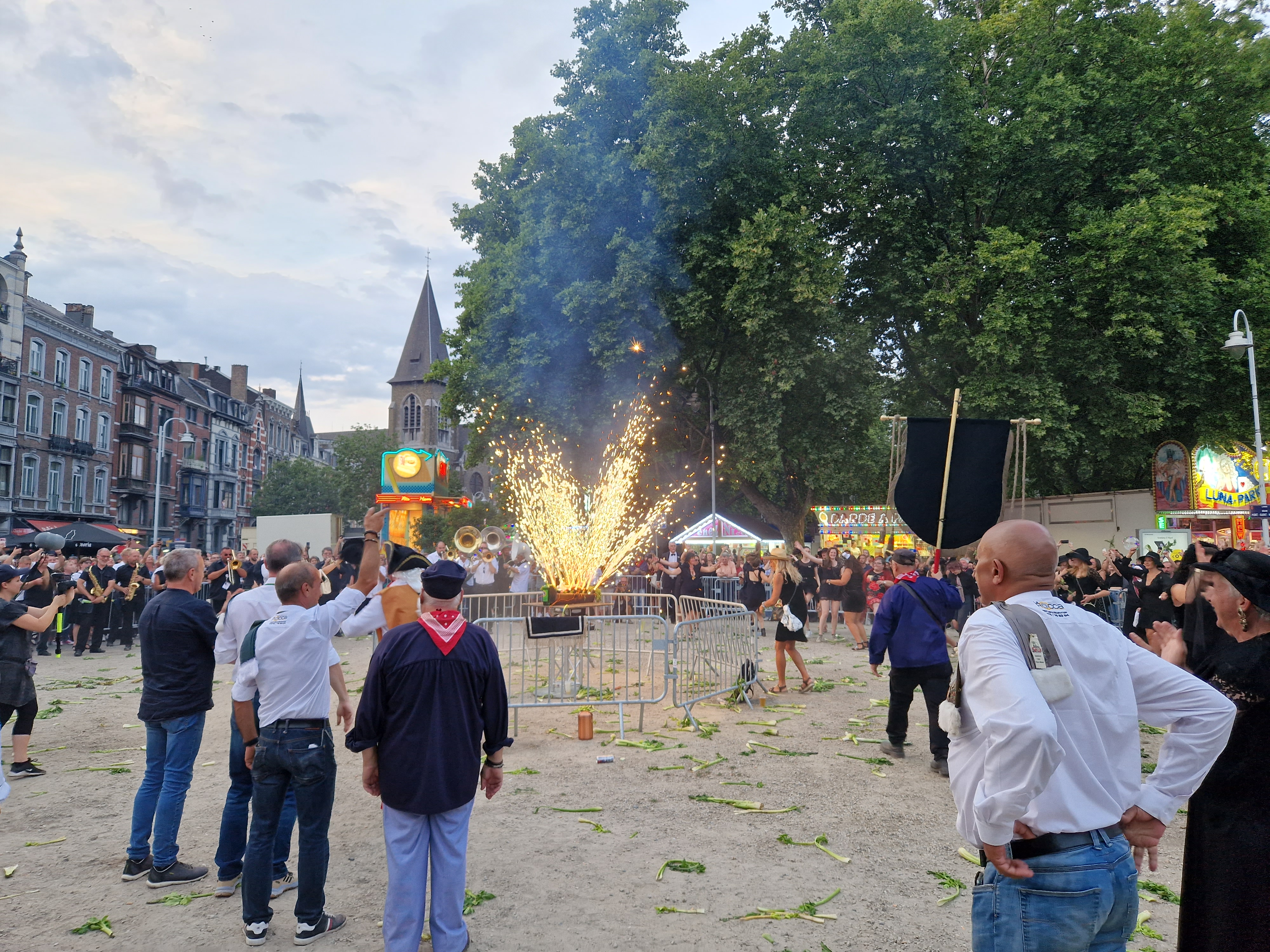
(Fictional) cremation of Matî l'Ohê in Outremeuse in 2022

Around 8 p.m. the procession reaches its conclusion and proceeds to the symbolic cremation of the bone. Participants are invited to lay their celery stalks at the feet of the deceased. The event ends with farandole dances led by the clergy and the deceased's close associates.

A little-known and intimate tradition follows: the bone, along with the bottle of peket that accompanied it throughout the procession, is buried in the garden of a hospitable soul. Both are unearthed the following May. The bottle is then served to the clergy and mourners present for the occasion. This act marks the resumption of the festivities.

== Origins ==
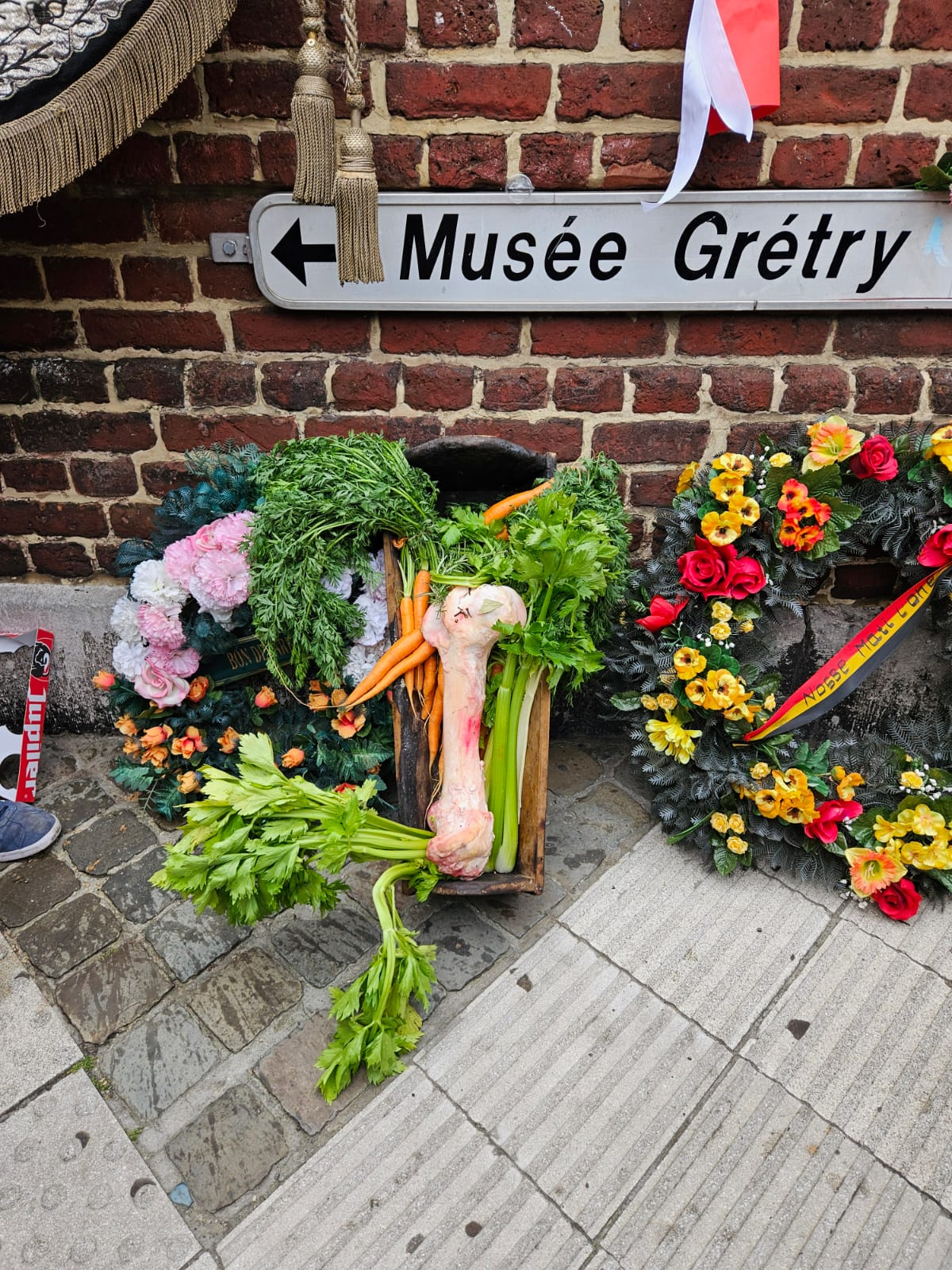
The remains of Matî in 2024, placed beneath a roadside shrine at the corner of Rue Fosse aux Raines and Rue Jean d'Outremeuse in the Outremeuse district.

The "Burial of the Bone" is a very old custom in the province of Liège. It evolved significantly over the centuries and was widespread across the province's various municipalities before gradually falling into disuse.

The earliest traces of festivities parodying a funeral date back to 1722. A Cri du Perron (an official public proclamation) from that year ordered participants in the "Burial of the Bone" ceremony to identify themselves. This burial reportedly took place on Ash Wednesday in the Montegnée district and involved moving "in a large group through the streets, carrying bones in the same manner as one carries the dead to their burial." The proclamation mentions participants carrying crosses, as well as pots and cauldrons parodying censers, alongside other objects mimicking Catholic liturgical utensils. Crosses adorned with attached brooms and a hammer, evoking the Passion of Jesus, were also observed. The procession, comprising mock priests and other costumed figures, sang tunes parodying the psalms and requiems appropriate for the occasion, all of it a mockery and imitation of a funeral procession.

Another document, likely linked to this type of festivity in the Diocese of Liège and signed by Vicar General Edmond de Stoupy, prohibited cross-dressing in ecclesiastical attire. The document expressed the indignation of Jean-Théodore of Bavaria, Prince-Bishop of Liège, regarding individuals who had been spotted in public disguised in ecclesiastical or secular attire. He consequently forbade the wearing of such garments under penalty of excommunication. Signed ten days before Ash Wednesday in 1751, this ban was almost certainly intended to prevent a recurrence of the abuses of this kind that had been witnessed with shock in previous years:

Having learned with as much surprise as indignation that certain persons have been rash and audacious enough to disguise themselves in ecclesiastical, secular, or religious clerical attire and appear thus in public—to the great scandal of all and in contempt of the ecclesiastical order—and wishing to effectively remedy such excesses and abuses, We hereby forbid all persons of either sex, regardless of rank, status, dignity, or station, under penalty of major excommunication, from disguising themselves or appearing in ecclesiastical, secular, or religious clerical attire. We further order our Archifisc to discharge the duties of his office against all transgressors, and our parish priests to publish this decree without delay.

The fact that these festivities originally took place on Ash Wednesday is significant. Burying a ham bone on this date marked the end of Carnival, symbolising the transition from a time of abundance to the period of deprivation imposed by the Church with the start of Lent. It also offered participants a chance to mock the Church, which strictly enforced these restrictions.

The cremation of the bone may also allude to the myth of the Phoenix: the bone is burned so that it may rise from its ashes the following year.

Interest in Carnival customs waned over time in the province of Liège. As the Church also became more lenient regarding Lenten abstinence and meat consumption, the symbolism behind the "burial of the bone" lost its significance, and the custom gradually disappeared. However, the tradition survives in a few localities, sometimes in different forms. In most of these places, it has lost its Carnival character and takes place at the end of the parish festival.

== Name of the bone ==
A few clues help form a preliminary answer regarding the origin of the name "Matî" given to the bone. In Faymonville, "Matî" refers to the calf, the fleshy part of the leg. Consequently, the connection between the fleshy part of the leg, the ham, and the bone is easily made.

== Outremeuse (Saint-Nicolas Church) ==
In the past, the "Matî l'Ohê" burial ceremony was organised by the residents of Rue Roture. This event was an integral part of their parish festival, held during the month of May. The tradition involved gathering a large number of ham bones and arranging them on a stretcher. This litter was then paraded through the Saint-Nicolas parish. At the end of the procession, the hams were sold in the hope of raising enough money to enjoy a few drinks together afterwards.

After a hiatus of some twenty years, it was decided to revive the burial tradition by incorporating it into Le Quinze Août festivities of 1974, in the form known today.

== Matî l'Ohê elsewhere ==
This tradition is still observed in Spa, having been revived in 1987 by the carnival group "Les Baladins". The carnival concludes with the burning of an effigy named Mathy Lhoxet on a pyre, following a funeral procession; the Grand Feu (bonfire) and the burial ceremony likely merged into a single festival at some point in the past.

The tradition also exists in certain villages, such as Melen, during the village festival on the first weekend of August, where it ends on Tuesday evening with the burial of Matî l'Ohê. It also features in the Saint-Pholien festivities (held in the Outremeuse district on the second-to-last weekend of June), which conclude on Wednesday with the burial of Matî l'Ohé. Until 2016, the effigy was burned in Place Sainte-Barbe; since then, following a change in City of Liège regulations, it is cast into the waters of the Meuse, still at the location adjacent to Place Sainte-Barbe.

== Gallery ==
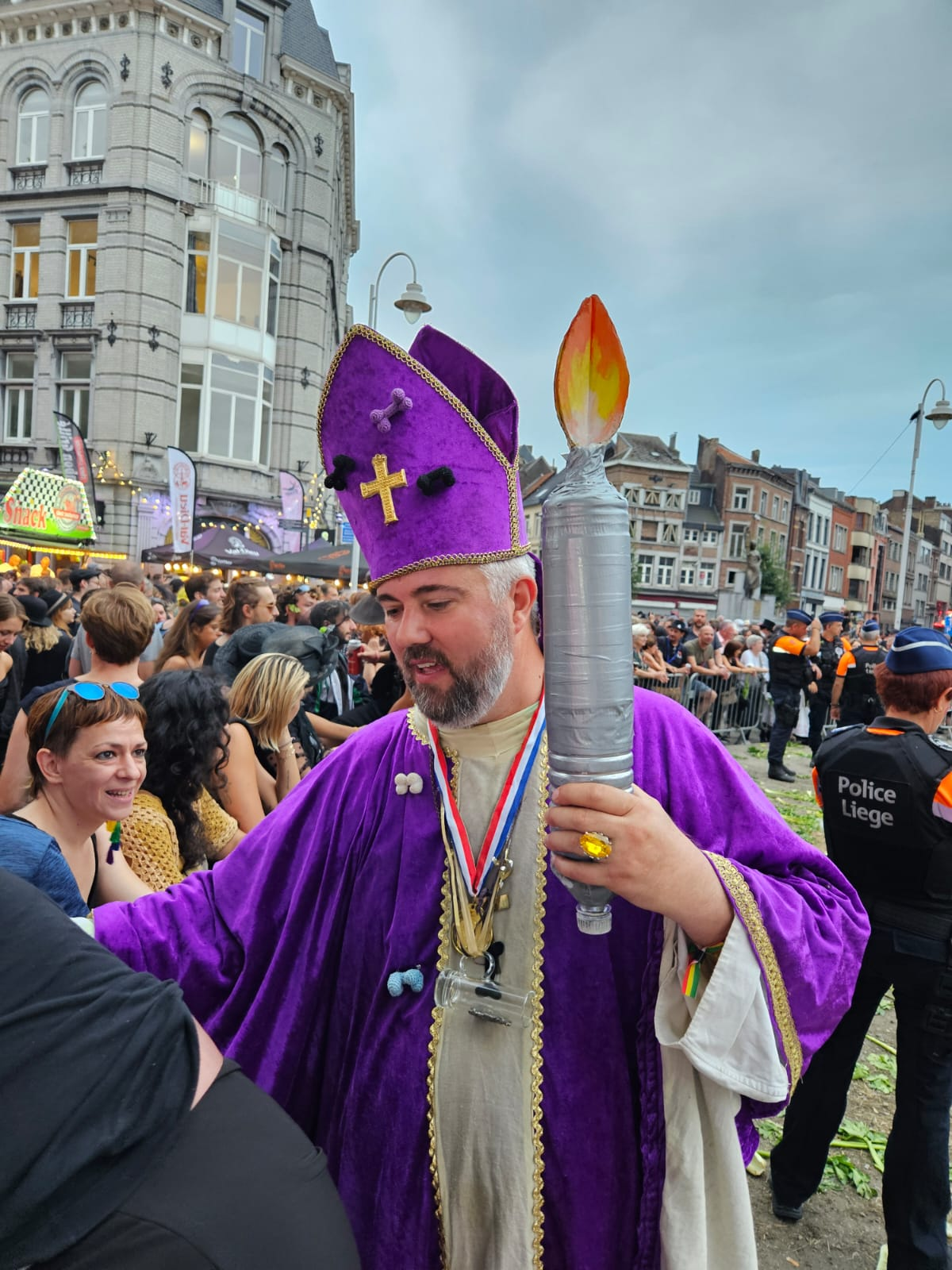
The bishop holding the Olympic torch – the theme of the 2024 procession.

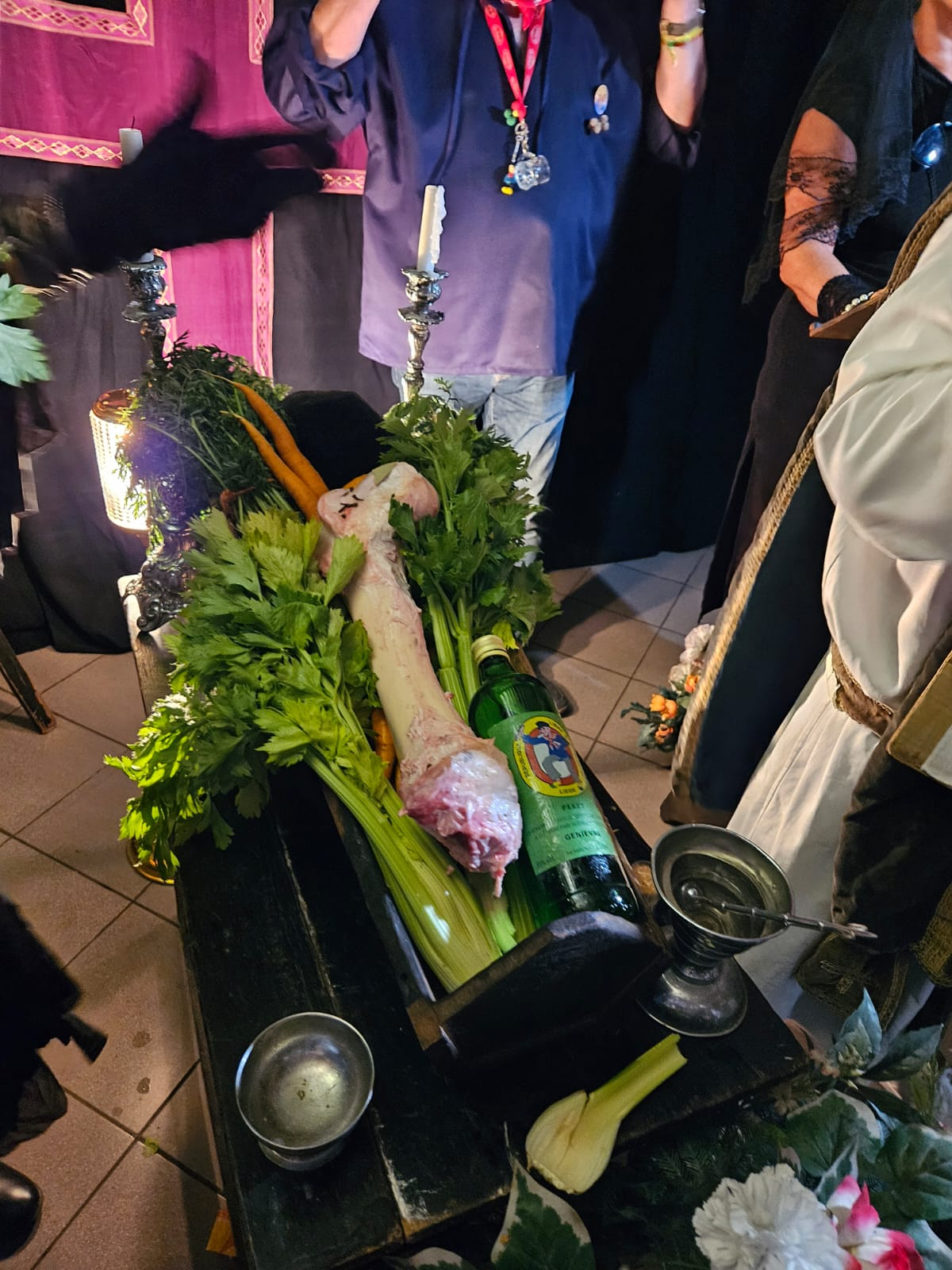
The remains of Matî l'Ohê, flanked by his celery, his bunch of carrots, and his bottle of peket, in 2024.

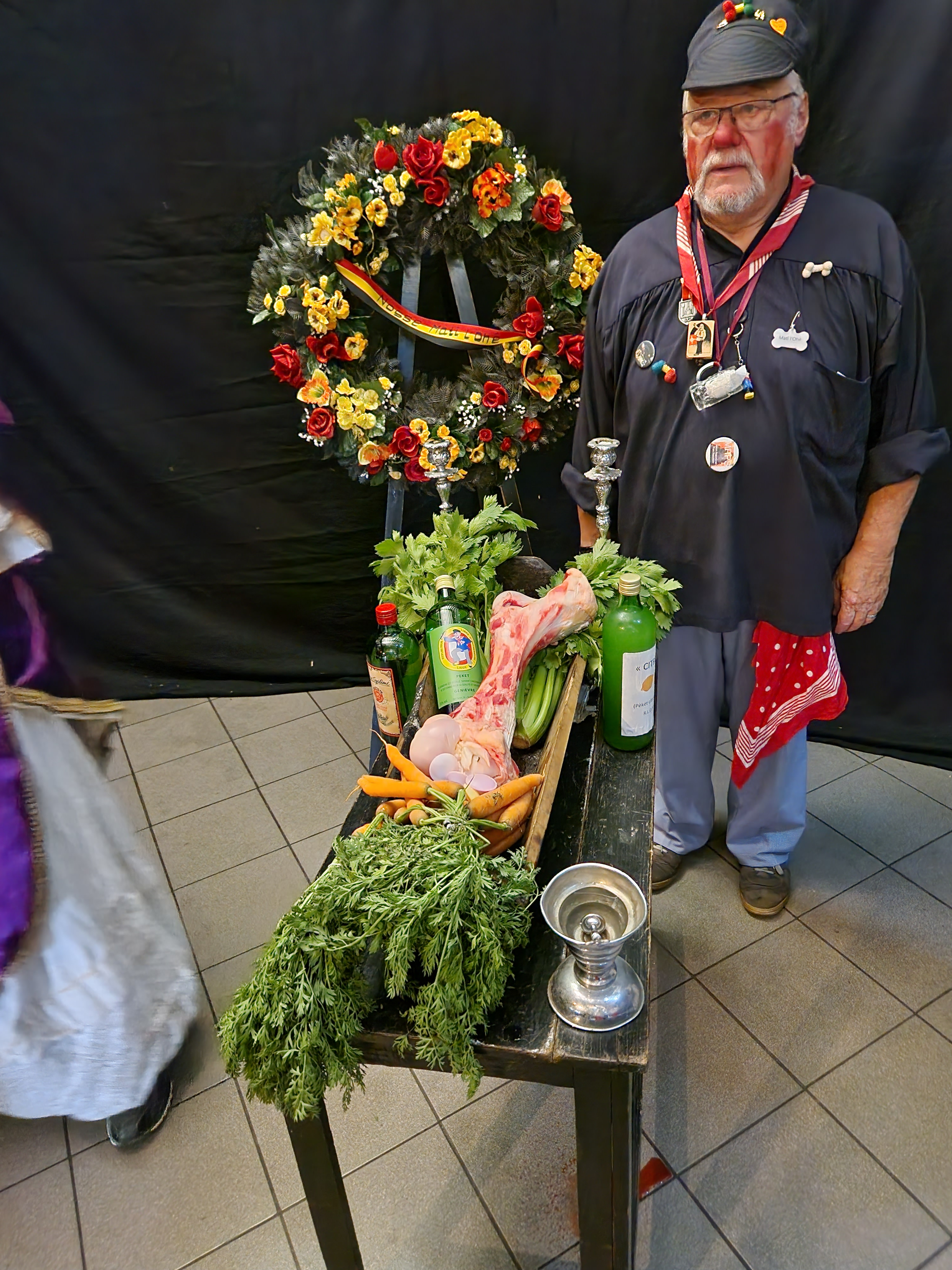
The remains of Matî l'Ohê at the Tchantchès Museum in 2022, with Marcel Janssens—the official bearer since 2013—in the background.

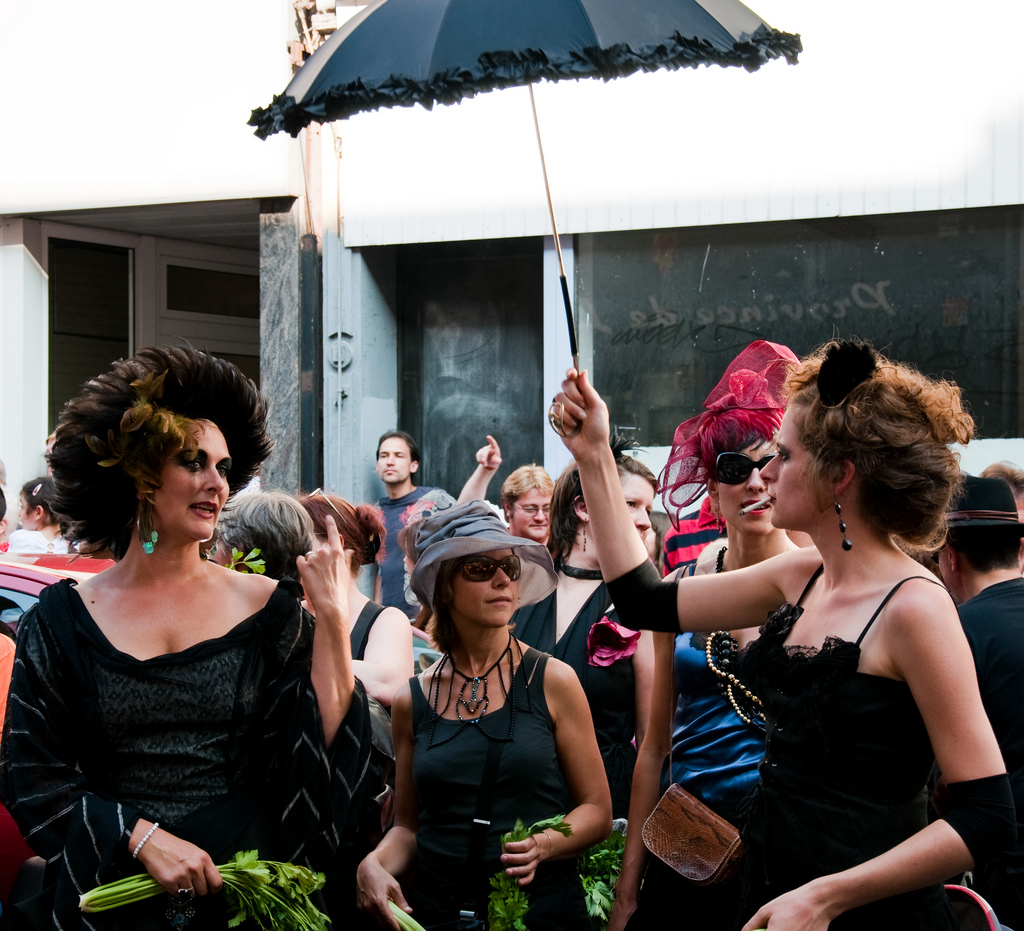
Professional mourners

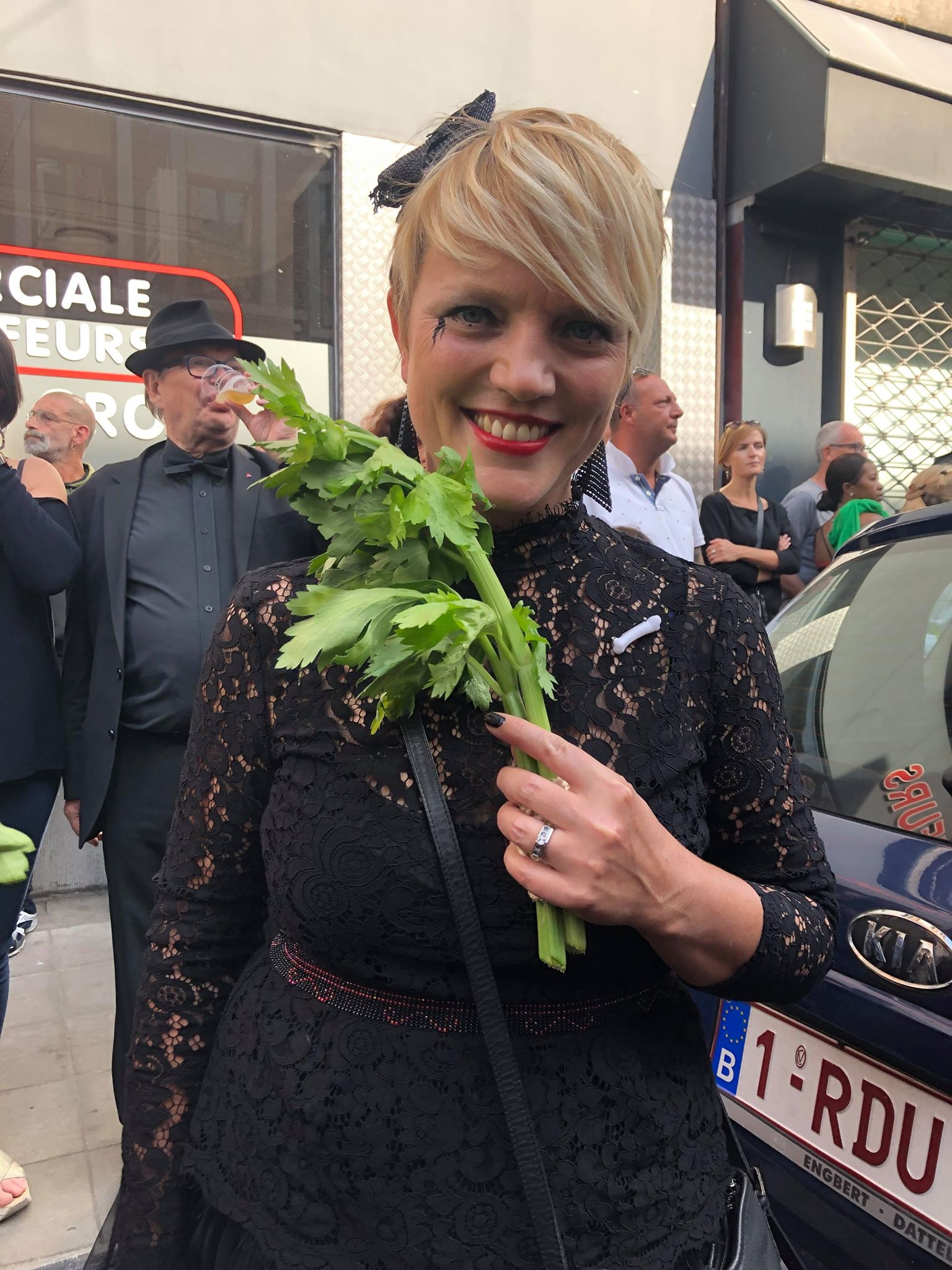
Mourner in Belle Époque attire, sporting celery and a bone-shaped brooch.

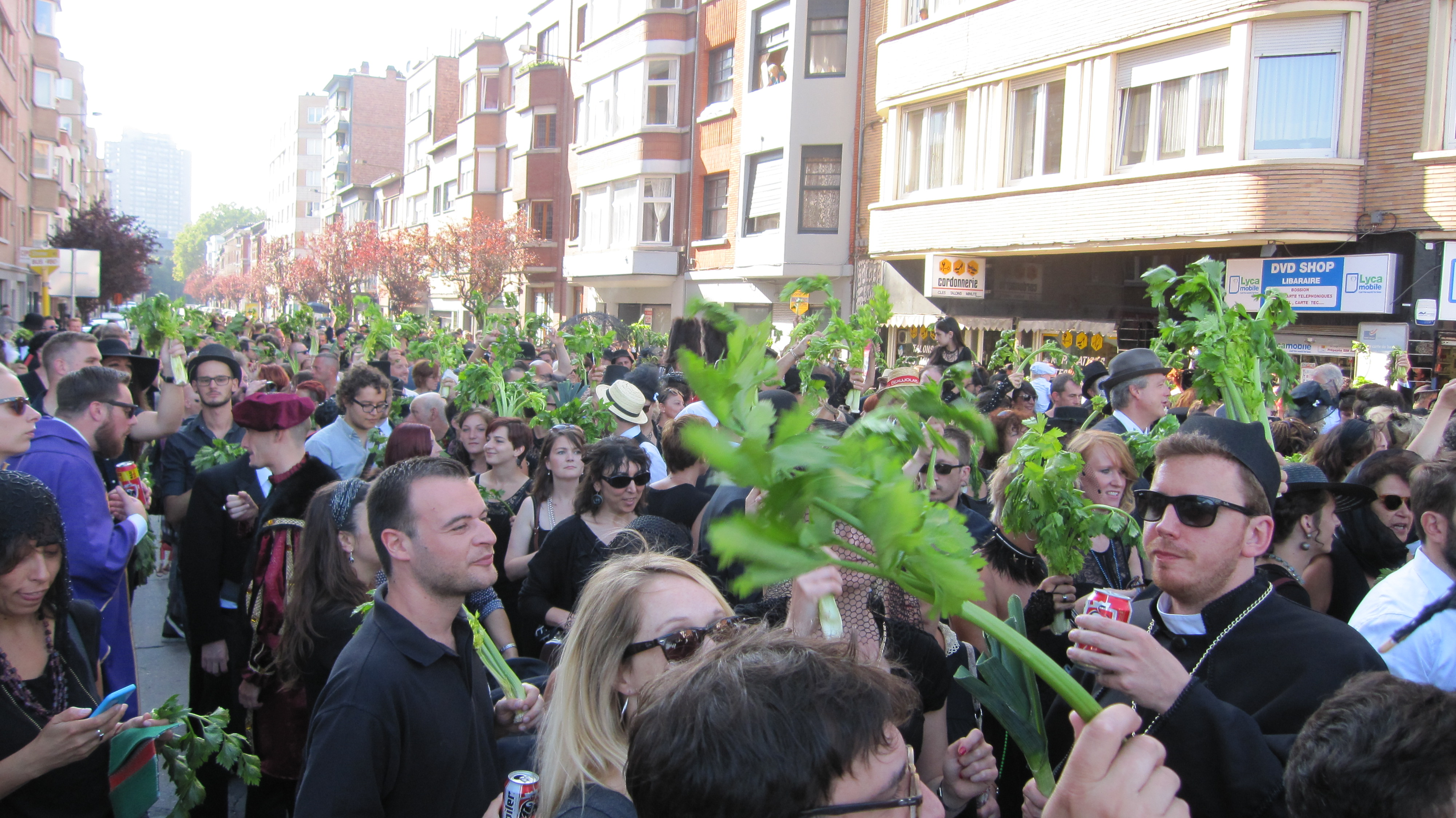
The funeral procession of Matî l'Ohê waving celery stalks in 2016.
