= Mary Cowan =

American serial killer (convicted 1894)

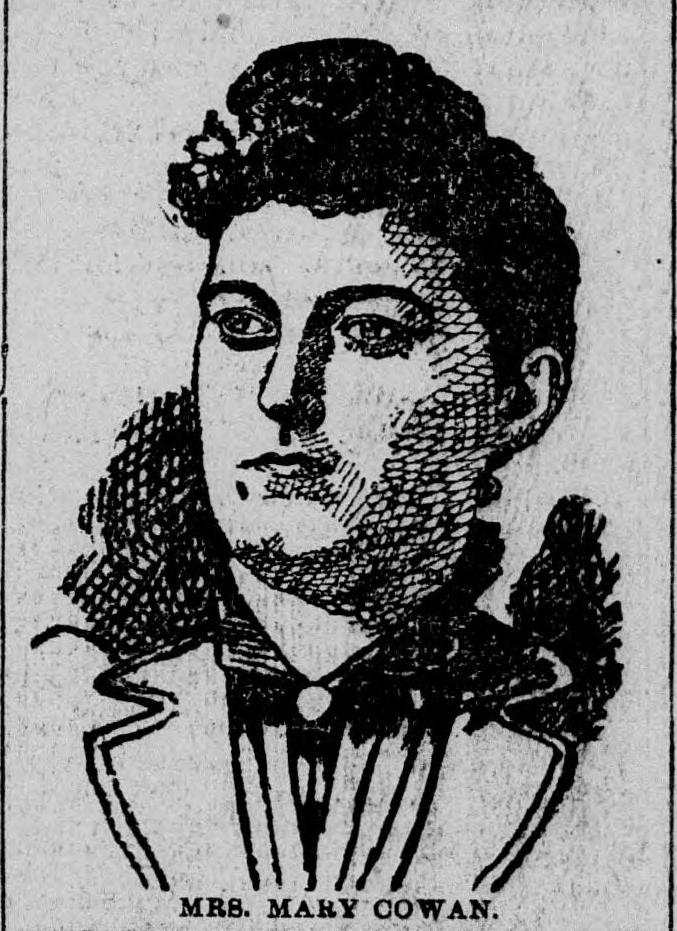
- Sketch of Mary Cowan
- Born: Mary A. Knight; March 8, 1863; Plymouth, Maine, U.S.
- Died: September 17, 1898 (aged 35); Maine State Prison, Thomaston, Maine, U.S.
- Other name: "The Borgia of Maine"
- Conviction: First degree murder
- Penalty: Life imprisonment

Details
- Victims: 6
- Span of crimes: 1884–1894
- Country: United States
- States: Ohio and Maine
- Date apprehended: September 1894

Mary A. Cowan (née Knight; March 8, 1863 – September 17, 1898), known as The Borgia of Maine, was an American serial killer who poisoned two husbands and four children between 1884 and 1894, and attempted to murder a third husband. Convicted of killing her step-son Willis Cowan in September 1894, Cowan was sentenced to life imprisonment and sent off to the Maine State Prison, where she died a few years later from an unspecified illness.

== Biography ==
Mary A. Knight was born as one of several children to Jonathan F. Knights, a veteran of the Civil War, and Apphia B. Knights (née Sidelinger). She lived on rural family home in Plymouth until the age of 20, when she married the young farmer Willis W. Bean of nearby Dixmont. The couple had three children: Gracie, Alice and Mabel. At some point during their marriage, Willis expressed a desire to become a physician, a decision encouraged by Mary, who wanted to dabble in it as well. However, the family was poor, and they also had to take care of their infants. In 1884, Gracie was found smothered to death by a neighbor at the family home. When he informed Mary of the matter, she carelessly replied that she was aware of the fact, and that the child had died about half an hour ago. No official investigation was made, but residents of Dixmont suspected that she had killed little Gracie to get rid of her. In the following two years, Alice and Mabel died from peculiar stomach aches, but yet again, no investigation was conducted, and the deaths soon forgotten after the burials at the Plymouth cemetery.

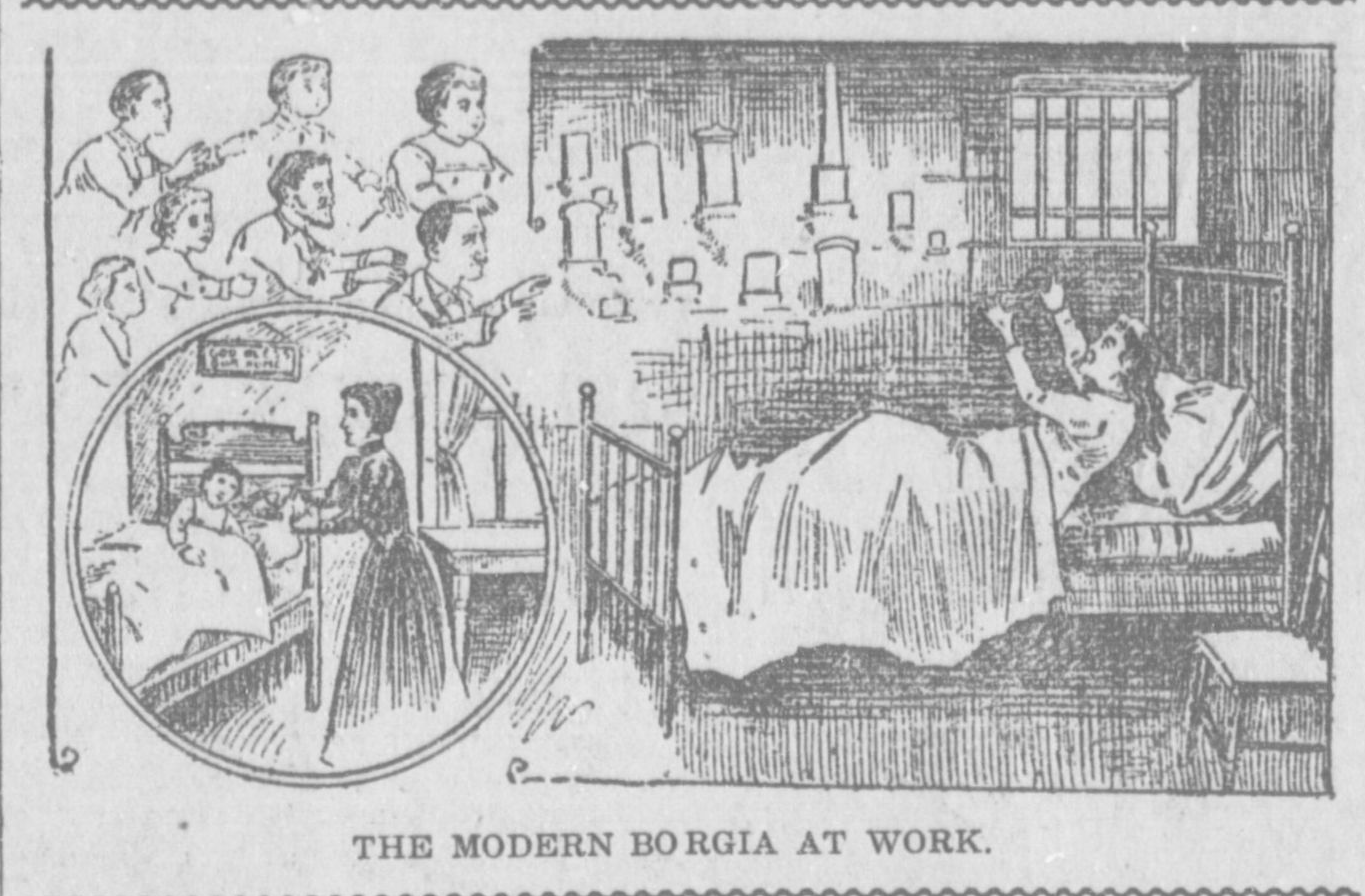
Illustration of Cowan's victims

Despite these tragedies, Willis still decided to pursue his medical career, enrolling into a dubious institute that sold diplomas for $25. However, this was considered fraudulent, and soon, a state law was passed which prohibited the selling of fake diplomas, right before Bean could acquire it. Unperturbed by this setback, both husband and wife were deadset on getting diplomas, choosing to travel to an out-of-state institution in Ohio to get them. Before their trip, Willis confided to his parents that he would invest money in a farm, in which he would live after returning to Maine. Said farm was purchased and the mortgage given to the elder Bean, but it was never recorded. After borrowing some $200, the couple traveled to Ohio to enroll into an institution. On January 6, 1888, Willis' parents received a letter claiming that their son had died mysteriously, with the cause of death later determined to be stomach pain, similar to the children who died in the previous years. Mary soon returned to stay with her late husband's parents, and soon after, the unrecorded mortgage went missing. Since she had the deed for the farm, and thus owned the land, Mary sold the farm for $2,000.

Some time later, Mary married George H. Taylor, a Dixmont laborer who worked at the Lewiston mills, where the newlyweds moved to live. Taylor, who belonged to the Independent Order of Odd Fellows, died after four days of acute stomach pain in 1891, in similar circumstances to Mary's former family. Since he was an Odd Fellow, it was supposed that he had a life insurance policy, but since George hadn't paid his dues, it was void. Nevertheless, well-meaning members contributed to a fund amounting several hundreds of dollars as a donation to the supposedly-grieving widow.

=== Murder of Willis Cowan and arrest ===
A few months after Taylor's death, Mary married Elias Cowan, a widowed farmer with an 8-year-old son, Willis. Not long after their marriage, a full set of farm buildings belonging to Elias mysteriously burned to the ground. According to neighbors who arrived to provide assistance with putting out the fires, they found the family's clothing, dishes and other items tied up in bundles and ready to be carried out. It was also rumored that young Willis was abused by his stepmother, who often beat him for the pettiest of things.

On September 14, 1894, Willis was brought down with heavy stomach pains after eating some green apples. A physician was called to the family home, who prescribed some medicine and assured that the young boy would be fine in a few hours. Two days later, the young Cowan died in agonizing pain. Due to Mary's dubious history of similar deaths, and the fact that her husband had also been taken with a similar illness but survived, Willis' body was exhumed and his organs sent for analysis at the Bowdoin College in Brunswick. The autopsy results showed that the body contained heavy amounts of arsenic, enough to kill a full-grown ox. Without wasting their time, policemen quickly arrested Mary Cowan for the murder of her stepson. Until then, she had threatened to pursue legal action if anybody accused her of poisoning, but when lodged in the prison, she started crying.

=== Trial and imprisonment ===
During her 1895 trial, an ample amount of evidence was presented, pinning Mary as the one who poisoned young Willis. One witness was a little neighborhood girl who had seen Mrs. Cowan putting white powder into the boy's medicine, which had been left by the doctor, but she did not testify per request of her father, who feared for her safety. Despite this, the prosecutor proved that the dose of arsenic present in the body could've only been put deliberately, and after a few days of deliberation, the jury returned with a guilty verdict. Cowan stood expressionless while listening to the verdict, with her counsel, J.F. Robinson, announcing that he would file a motion for a retrial. In June, however, it was announced that the proceedings for the retrial had been withdrawn.

While in prison, Mary Cowan conducted interviews with reporters and often responded to callers interested in her case. On one occasion, she confided to a reporter that she had hired a private detective who supposedly unearthed evidence in favor of her innocence, and expressed the belief that she would be a free woman again one day. Her hopes were dashed on February 19, 1896, when she was officially sentenced to life imprisonment for killing Willis Cowan.

Cowan was imprisoned at the Maine State Prison, then in Thomaston, for the following two years. In 1898, her examining physician turned to then-governor Llewellyn Powers with the request of pardoning Mary, as she was in failing health and wished to die peacefully in her Dixmont home. Despite her ailment, Mary gave birth to a child while in prison, but it, along with herself, died soon after. Cowan, by then dubbed 'The Borgia of Maine' by the press, was first interred at Etna, where her parents lived, but her body was then moved to the Sawyer Cemetery in her birthplace of Plymouth, where she was buried on the family plot with her murder victims.

== See also ==
- List of serial killers in the United States
- List of serial killers with the nickname “Borgia”
