= Sarah Jane Robinson =

Irish-born American serial killer

- Born: Sarah Jane Tennent; 1838; Newtownhamilton, County Armagh, Ireland
- Died: January 3, 1906 (aged 68–69); Boston, Massachusetts, U.S.
- Other names: "The Boston Borgia" "The Massachusetts Borgia"
- Conviction: First degree murder
- Penalty: Death; commuted to life imprisonment

Details
- Victims: 8–11
- Span of crimes: 1881–1886
- Country: United States
- State: Massachusetts
- Date apprehended: August 12, 1886

Sarah Jane Robinson (née Tennant; May 26, 1838 – January 3, 1906), known as The Boston Borgia, was an Irish-born American serial killer who poisoned her family members and other people from 1881 to 1886, with the help of her accomplices Thomas R. Smith and Dr. Charles C. Beers. She was initially sentenced to death for the poisoning of her brother-in-law, but the verdict was later changed to life imprisonment, with Robinson dying behind bars.

== Early life ==
Sarah Jane Tennant was born and raised in Newtownhamilton, a small town in County Armagh in Ulster, the northern province in Ireland; she emigrated to Massachusetts with her sister when she was fourteen or fifteen years old. She married Moses Robinson in July 1858, thus becoming Sarah Jane Robinson. Over the course of their marriage, the couple had eight children, five of whom survived infancy. They initially settled in Sherborn, Massachusetts, moving around the Boston area throughout their marriage. Robinson became a member of the Cottage Street Methodist Church, where she later on would meet her future partner-in-crime: Thomas R. Smith, a prominent church leader and one-time superintendent of the local Sunday school in Hyde Park. Both of them were well known in the community, with Robinson standing out for her constantly changing addresses in order to avoid paying rent and other bills.

== Discovery of crimes ==
From 1881 and 1886, several members of the Robinson family died from mysterious illnesses, all with similar symptoms such as excruciating stomach pain and vomiting. Each time, the sickly were attended to by Sarah Jane Robinson, who supervised the administration of all medicine. When the victims eventually needed medical attention, Robinson called a different physician each time. Curiously, all of the deceased except for Oliver Sleeper had life insurance policies through the United Order of Pilgrim Fathers. Mr. Sleeper, the Robinson's landlord, was nursed by Sarah Jane during his illness, and died of what, at the time, was deemed heart disease. She tried to bill the family $50 for nursing services. They instead gave her a break on her rent. His family discovered $3,000 missing from his apartment. Though it was never proven, it was assumed that Sarah Jane had stolen it.

Already the deaths of Robinson's eldest daughter Elizabeth (24) and her nephew Thomas Freeman (7) had caused suspicion and were under investigation, but the breaking point came when her son, William, was taken sick with the previous symptoms. Although he died shortly afterward, he still managed to point at his mother as the one responsible for his condition. Using this knowledge, Dr. White preserved parts of William's stomach for later analysis at Harvard College, which revealed large quantities of arsenic. White then informed the authorities, who swiftly arrested Robinson and Smith, who had just arrived at the house. After a quick prayer for the mother and the son, the duo were taken to the police station for questioning.

== Further charges, trial and sentence ==
While the police were still investigating, they made one further arrest: that of Dr. Charles C. Beers, of Boston. In October 1886, the trio were indicted for William and Lizzie's murders, with all of them pleading not guilty on every charge at their arraignment on December 14, 1886. Then, surprisingly, in January 1887, the grand jury revealed four more indictments against Sarah Jane for the killings of Oliver Sleeper, Sarah's husband Moses, her brother-in-law Prince Arthur Freeman, and little Thomas Freeman. During this whole ordeal, Robinson tried to feign insanity, but this was later refuted by Dr. Kelly of the McLean Asylum.

Before the trial started, a nolle prosequi was entered by Attorney General A. J. Waterman, dismissing the charges against Thomas Smith and Charles Beers. On December 13, 1887, the trial against Sarah Jane for the murder of her son, William, began. The six-day long trial was followed by twenty-four hours of jury deliberation and resulted in a hung jury. On February 6, 1888, Sarah Jane was put on trial for the murder of her brother-in-law, Prince Arthur Freeman. On February 11, 1888, Sarah Jane Robinson was convicted of murdering Prince Freeman and sentenced to death by hanging. The following year, when Robinson's house had already been sold at auction and the new owner was making improvements, a box of rat poison was discovered behind the furnace, in a hole of the cellar wall, which was quickly tied back to Robinson.

After her sentence was announced, and despite the fact a majority of the public disdained her, a petition was started to commute Robinson's sentence. Although the Governor's Council allegedly was against such a decision, they later decided to indeed commute the sentence to life in prison, much to the surprise of both the press and the citizens of Boston. Robinson died behind bars on January 3, 1906.

== Victims ==
All but one of Robinson's victims were poisoned with the aim of collecting insurance money. She poisoned:

- Oliver Sleeper, landlord, age 72, poisoned on August 10, 1881
- Moses Robinson, husband, age 45, poisoned on July 25, 1882. Moses, who lived in Cambridge, was alleged to have died due to drinking cold water after overheating himself. This was challenged by the insurance company, who refused to pay Robinson a cent. She then moved out of Cambridge.
- Emma M. Robinson, daughter, age 10, poisoned on September 6, 1884
- Annie Freeman, sister, age about 45, poisoned on February 28, 1885
- Prince Arthur Freeman, brother-in-law, age 33, poisoned on June 27, 1885. After his death, Robinson adopted his son and received the $2,000 he had been insured for in order to care for the child.
- Elizabeth "Lizzie" A. Robinson, daughter, age 24, poisoned on February 22, 1886
- Thomas Arthur Freeman, nephew, age 7, poisoned on July 23, 1886
- William "Willie" J. Robinson, son, age 22, poisoned on August 12, 1886

It was also alleged that Robinson could have attempted to poison upwards of a thousand people by putting arsenic into the ice cream offered at a festival at the Sunday School in June 1885. This, however, was promptly dismissed.

== See also ==
- List of serial killers in the United States
- List of serial killers with the nickname "Borgia"

== Bibliography ==
- James Manning Winchell Yerrinton (25 November 2018). The Official Report of the Trial of Sarah Jane Robinson: For the Murder of Prince Arthur Freeman, in the Supreme Judicial Court of Massachusetts (Classic Reprint). Forgotten Books. ISBN 978-0331073119.
