= Mary Frances Creighton =

Executed American serial killer

- Born: July 29, 1899; Rahway, New Jersey, U.S.
- Died: July 16, 1936 (aged 36); Sing Sing Prison, Ossining, New York, U.S.
- Status: Executed
- Conviction: First degree murder
- Penalty: Death

Mary Frances Creighton (July 29, 1899 – July 16, 1936) was an American woman convicted and executed for murder by poisoning. Creighton was nicknamed "The Long Island Borgia" and the "Black-Eyed Borgia by the press, because of her use of arsenic poisoning. She was sentenced to death by electric chair. It was reported that the prison authorities had mercifully eased her path to the chair. They had, it was said, given her a hypodermic injection of morphine shortly before her execution, thereby inducing a coma. Creighton was suspected of murdering three people for life insurance money in New Jersey in the 1920s. She had been acquitted in two of these murders and was never tried for the third. Creighton confessed to one of these murders after her arrest in the third case.

== Early life ==
Mary Frances Avery was born in Rahway, New Jersey. As a young girl, both her parents died, and she and her siblings were raised by their maternal grandparents. Growing up, she was not known to be an outstanding student and she made few friends, preferring to keep to herself. Creighton was estranged from her two sisters because of a quarrel about the inheritance from their parents.

When she was 15 years old, she moved to Newark where she graduated from high school. In 1917, she met her future husband, John Creighton, a sailor who fought in the First World War. The couple married on December 25, 1918.

== Murders and first trial ==
The couple moved in with John's parents, Walter and Anna Creighton, who owned a house in Roseville, Newark. In 1918, John and Mary Frances had a daughter, Ruth. Some years later, Mary Frances's younger brother, Charles Raymond Avery, moved into the house. The addition of another person made the house more crowded and the relationship between Creighton and her mother-in-law became strained, as they both wanted to decide how the house should be run. Matters were not improved by the fact that whenever John and Mary Frances argued, both of her husband's parents would support him against her.

The relationship between Creighton and her mother-in-law continued to deteriorate, with Creighton telling neighbours that her mother-in-law was a disturbed person who was talking about wanting to commit suicide.

In 1920, her mother-in-law became ill. She was admitted to hospital with fever and cramps, and subsequently died. In 1921, Creighton's father-in-law died, and in 1923, Creighton's brother Raymond also died. Raymond had named his sister the sole beneficiary of his $1,000 life insurance policy. These deaths caught the attention of the authorities, and Creighton was suspected of poisoning all three.

Creighton and her husband, John, were tried for Raymond's death in 1923, but were acquitted due to a lack of witnesses. The Anna Creighton murder trial, also in 1923, ended with Creighton being acquitted, again due to a lack of witnesses, and due to the testimony of toxicologist Alexander Gettler, who found only a trace amount of arsenic in Anna Creighton's system. John Creighton stood by his wife and protested her innocence throughout. During the 1923 trial, Creighton was pregnant and gave birth to a son, John Jr.

Feeling that they could no longer make a home in Newark due to the suspicions and trials, the family relocated to Baldwin, Long Island. There John Creighton made the acquaintance of a neighbour named Everett Appelgate, (Note: Commonly misspelled as "Applegate" in media reports.) a fellow member of the local American Legion association. The two men became friends, and upon hearing that Appelgate and his wife Ada were currently living with Ada's father, John Creighton proposed that the Appelgates move in with his family. This would also help supplement the Creightons' income through rent paid by the Appelgates. The Creightons' daughter, Ruth, and the Appelgates' daughter, Agnes, had become friends, so this seemed to be an ideal situation.

Through later investigation and witness accounts of Ruth Creighton and others, it was revealed that Everett Appelgate had been grooming Ruth. Appelgate had also, according to Creighton, been having a sexual relationship with her. Creighton's defense lawyer would later claim that she had been "a woman led wrong by the power of an evil man."

In September 1935, Ada Appelgate became sick and was taken to the hospital where she was examined and sent home. Several days later, Ada died at home of unknown causes. It was suspected that it could have been pneumonia or some other natural cause.

Not long after Ada Appelgate's death, an anonymous source sent the police a letter and a package of newspaper clippings dating back to 1923 and Creighton's trial that implicated her in other suspicious deaths, urging them to investigate the death of Ada Appelgate. Nassau County's District Attorney's office began an investigation and autopsy was performed on Ada Appelgate and traces of arsenic were found. This was enough to arrest Creighton. Creighton claimed to have poisoned Ada Appelgate so that her fifteen-year-old daughter, Ruth, whom she had been pimping out to Everett Appelgate, could legally marry Everett. In her confession, Creighton initially said Everett was involved, then said he was not involved, before returning to her original statement. Everett himself maintained his innocence. Creighton also confessed to the murder of her brother in 1923.

== Trial ==
Creighton and Appelgate were both convicted of first degree murder. Mrs. Creighton appeared "chalky-white” said the New York Post, "but the plump, brown-gowned Borgia gave no outward signs of dismay." On January 29, both defendants returned to Nassau County court to hear the formal verdict. Judge Cortland A. Johnson sentenced them to execution through the electric chair during the week of March 9, just five weeks away.

== Death ==
Creighton was imprisoned at Sing Sing Prison to await execution. On the day of the execution (July 16, 1936) Creighton was suffering from hysterical paralysis and was given a morphine injection. Some reports state that she was completely unconscious when the electric chair was turned on. Appelgate, still protesting his innocence, was executed the same day. His last words were, "Before I die, I say I am innocent of this crime. God have mercy on Martin Littleton of Nassau County." Prior to her execution, one of her attorneys, Louis Schiff, asked her to clear Applegate of murder if he was not involved. However, Creighton said she had told the truth.

== In media ==
The case and Mary Frances Creighton were showcased on the true crime TV show Deadly Women (season 6, episode 4) on the episode "Matriarchs of Murder".

== See also ==
- List of serial killers with the nickname “Borgia”
