= Sarah Whiteling =

German-born American serial poisoner

Sarah Jane Whiteling
- Sketch of Whiteling
- Born: 1848; Germany (claimed)
- Died: June 25, 1889 (aged 40–41); Moyamensing Prison, Philadelphia, Pennsylvania, United States
- Cause of death: Execution by hanging
- Other names: "The Wholesale Poisoner" "The Philadelphia Poisoner" "The Philadelphia Murderess"
- Status: Executed
- Conviction: First degree murder
- Penalty: Death

Details
- Victims: 3
- Span of crimes: March – May 1888
- Country: United States
- State: Pennsylvania

Sarah Jane Whiteling (1848 – June 25, 1889), known as The Wholesale Poisoner, was a German-born American serial killer who poisoned her husband and two children in the span of three months in 1888. She was sentenced to death and executed for her crimes, becoming the first woman to have been executed in Philadelphia County.

== Early life ==
Claiming to have been born in Germany, Sarah was initially married to Tom Brown in Clinton, Iowa in 1868. At some point, the couple moved to Chicago. After the Great Fire, they moved to Philadelphia. A few years later, Brown was imprisoned in the Eastern State Penitentiary for highway robbery, and died serving his sentence.

Sarah then had a child with a man named Thomas Storey, who kept an oyster saloon in the city, naming her Bertha. In March 1880, she married John Whiteling, bringing along her then 9-month-old daughter with them. In 1886, the couple had their own child, which they named William C. Whiteling, nicknamed 'Willie'.

== Murders ==
On March 30, 1888, John died suddenly, with the attending physician Dr. G. W. Smith evaluating that the cause of death was inflammation of the bowels. His life had been insured in two companies: the John Hancock Financial and the Benevolent Order of Buffalos, each paying Sarah $145 and $85 respectively. When questioned about his death, she claimed that he had committed suicide.

On April 24, Bertha also died, with her verdict being typhoid fever. She, too, had been insured by the John Hancock Financial for $122. And a month after, on May 26, Willie also died. Since Dr. Smith abandoned the case, his colleague Dr. Dietrich determined the cause of death as congestion of the bowels. Like his sister and father, he too had been insured: for $30 at the John Hancock Financial, and for $17 at Prudential Financial. Sarah refused when asked if the bodies could be examined by the coroner, claiming that when one of her previous children supposedly died in an almshouse, doctors had started the post mortem exam process and realised, much too late, that the child was still alive.

== Discovery and confession ==
The short intervals of the deaths proved suspicious to Coroner Ashbridge, and after an examination with the Health Office, he ordered that the case be investigated. With the assistance of Chief Det. Wood and Det. Gyer, the bodies were exhumed from Mechanics' Cemetery. Following an examination performed by Professor Leffman, large amounts of arsenic were discovered in the bodies. Sarah Jane Whiteling was arrested shortly after, and placed on suicide watch. Spending most of her imprisonment in prayer, suffering from a nervous prostration for a physician to be called in, she confessed to murdering her two children using "Rough on Rats".

When questioned about her motives, Mrs. Whiteling claimed that she had murdered Bertha in order to prevent her from becoming a "sinful and wicked girl", as she had constantly misbehaved and stolen various items, such as pennies and pocketbooks, from her teacher and neighbors. As for Willie, he was apparently poisoned because he was "in the way". When it came to John's death, Sarah vehemently denied poisoning him herself, and instead claimed that while she had bought the poison, he had taken it by his own volition because of the family's extreme poverty. Apparently, she had planned to take her own life after the murders, but decided against it since the Bible states that those who take their own life cannot enter Heaven.

== Trial, sentence and execution ==
At her trial, Whiteling's lawyer tried his best to convince the jury that his client was insane, and had to be sentenced to life imprisonment. After deliberating on the issue, they returned and pronounced her guilty of first degree murder and received a mandatory death sentence. While the verdict didn't faze Sarah at all, it shocked the contemporary public in Philadelphia, especially the female population, who went so far as to sign a petition for commutation of her sentence.

Despite this, Gov. Beaver did not change her sentence. Whiteling was only prosecuted for her daughter's murder, as there was insufficient evidence for the other murders. While imprisoned, Sarah was informed that she had been left a fortune from a deceased relative back in Iowa.

On the execution date, Sarah Whiteling appeared to be unmoved by her conundrum, as she believed that God would forgive her sins and that she would go to Heaven to be with her children. On June 25, 1889, at 10 o'clock, following a short prayer delivered by Rev. William D. Jones, the trap was sprung. Whiteling suffocated from the strangulation although, according to physicians, her heart had continued beating for a little while after the drop. Her body was then sent for dissection to Dr. Alice W. Bennett, who examined her brain before eventually being sent off to be buried alongside her murdered relatives.

== See also ==
- List of serial killers in the United States
- List of serial killers with the nickname “Borgia”

== Bibliography ==
- Joseph W. Laythe (2011). Engendered Death: Pennsylvania Women Who Kill. Lexington Books. ISBN 978-1611460933.
- Marlin Shipman (2002). The Penalty Is Death: U. S. Newspaper Coverage of Women's Executions. University of Missouri Press. ISBN 0826263054.
- Kerry Segrave (2008). Women and Capital Punishment in America, 1840–1889: Death Sentences and Executions in the United States and Canada. McFarland. ISBN 978-0786438235.
