= Tillie Klimek =

Polish-American serial killer

- Klimek after her arrest in 1922
- Born: Otylia Gburek; 1876; Poland
- Died: 20 November 1936 (aged 59–60); Illinois State Penitentiary, Will County, Illinois, U.S.
- Conviction: Murder
- Penalty: Life imprisonment

Details
- Victims: 5–7
- Span of crimes: 1914–1921
- Country: United States
- State: Illinois

Ottilie "Tillie" Klimek (born Otylia Gburek; 1876 – November 20, 1936) was a Polish American serial killer, active in Chicago. According to accounts, she pretended to have precognitive dreams, accurately predicting the dates of death of her victims, when in reality she was merely scheduling their deaths.

== Biography ==
Klimek was born Otylia Gburek in Poland, and came to the United States as an infant with her parents. Tillie married her original husband Jozef Mitkiewicz in 1895. In 1914, he died after a short illness. The death certificate listed the cause of death as heart trouble, and she quickly remarried Joseph Ruskowski, who lived nearby. He too died in short order, as did a boyfriend who had "jilted" her.

The crime for which Klimek was eventually tried was the murder of Frank Kupczyk, her third husband. He had taken ill in their apartment at 924 N. Winchester, where she had previously lived with a boyfriend under the name of Meyers, and she began to tell neighbors that Frank "would not live long." She mocked Frank himself, greeting him in the morning by saying "It won't be long now," and "You'll be dying soon," and joking with neighbors that he had "two inches to live."

She even knitted her own mourning hat as she sat at his bedside (which she later wore to the trial), and asked for the landlady's permission to store a bargain coffin she'd found for sale in the basement. This may have been what led to the belief that she claimed to "predict" deaths.

In 1921, after Frank's death, Klimek married a man named Joseph Klimek and lived with him at 1453 Tell Place (now 1453 Thomas Street). When he became ill, doctors suspected arsenic poisoning, and tests confirmed it. She was arrested. It was later said that she told the arresting officer that, "The next one I want to cook a dinner for is you."

=== Investigation ===
Bodies of Klimek's other husbands were soon exhumed and found to contain lethal doses of arsenic, though the soil around them was clean. Police also arrested her cousin, Nellie Koulik. Klimek told the police that she had told Nellie she was tired of her husband Frank. Nellie suggested divorce. Klimek said that, "I will get rid of him some other way," and claimed that Nellie had given her a "goodly portion" of a poison called "Rough on Rats".

After Klimek's arrest, it came to light that several relatives and neighbors of the two women had died. Two neighbors Klimek had quarreled with became gravely ill after being given candy by her. A dog that annoyed Klimek in her Winchester Street house had died of arsenic poisoning. Several of Klimek and Nellie's cousins and relatives were found to have become gravely ill shortly after eating at Klimek's house. In all, the list included twenty suspected victims, fourteen of whom had died. Police announced plans to exhume the bodies of former husbands John Ruszkakshi and Joseph Mitkiewicz, while a cousin, Harry Suida, reported to the state's attorney that his sister Rose had died after attending a dinner at Klimek's home.

The papers began to speak of Klimek not as a solo murderer, but as the "high priestess" of a "Bluebeard clique" in Chicago's Little Poland neighborhood. Other wives in the neighborhood were arrested and released. Joseph Klimek would survive, though he was still in the hospital more than three months later. It was found that she had taken out life insurance policies on her husbands from which she profited greatly.

In March 1923, Klimek was found guilty of the murder of Frank Kupczyk, her third known husband. On the first ballot the jury voted guilty, and on a second ballot four jurors voted for the death penalty before all agreed on life imprisonment. Reporters noted that unlike most of the husband-killers who had been acquitted in Chicago courts, Klimek was not beautiful or charming, but a "squat" woman who spoke only broken English, despite having lived in the country since infancy. She was sentenced to life in prison, the harshest sentence that had ever been leveled against a woman in Cook County.

Nellie was later acquitted after spending a year in prison during her drawn-out trial. Klimek often teased her in prison, once convincing her that she was about to be taken out and hanged.

Klimek died in prison at Joliet Correctional Center on November 20, 1936, and was interred at the Bohemian National Cemetery in Chicago.

== See also ==
- List of serial killers in the United States
