= Black Widows of Liverpool =

Irish murderers

Catherine Flannagan
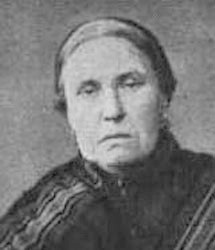
- Catherine Flannagan
- Born: 1829; Ireland
- Died: 1884 (aged 54–55); Kirkdale Prison, Liverpool, England, UK
- Cause of death: Hanging
- Occupation: Landlady
- Conviction: Murder
- Penalty: Death

Details
- Victims: 4 alleged, 1 convicted
- Span of crimes: 1880–1883
- Country: England
- Date apprehended: October 1883; 143 years ago

Margaret Higgins
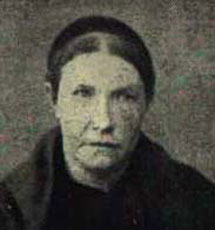
- Margaret Higgins
- Born: 1843; Ireland
- Died: 1884 (aged 40–41); Kirkdale Prison, Liverpool, England, UK
- Cause of death: Hanging
- Occupation: Landlady
- Conviction: Murder
- Penalty: Death

Details
- Victims: 4 alleged, 1 convicted
- Span of crimes: 1880–1883
- Country: England
- Date apprehended: October 1883; 143 years ago

Catherine Flannagan (1829 – 3 March 1884) and Margaret Higgins (1843 – 3 March 1884) were Irish sisters who were convicted of poisoning and murdering one person in Liverpool, England, and suspected of four more deaths. The women collected a burial society payout (a type of life insurance) on each death, and were found to have been committing murders using arsenic to obtain the insurance money. Although Flannagan evaded police for a time, both sisters were caught and convicted of one of the murders; they were both hanged on the same day at Kirkdale Prison. Modern investigation of the crime has raised the possibility that the sisters were part of a larger conspiracy of murder-for-profit—a network of "black widows"—but no convictions were ever obtained for any of the alleged conspiracy members other than the two sisters.

== Deaths ==
In 1880, unmarried sisters Catherine and Margaret Flannagan (Note: References spell the last name both "Flannagan" and "Flanagan", but most use two Ns.) ran a rooming house at 5 Skirving Street in Liverpool. The household consisted of the two sisters, Catherine's son John Flannagan, and two lodger families—hod carrier Thomas Higgins, Higgins' daughter Mary, Patrick Jennings, and Jennings' daughter Margaret. John Flannagan, aged 22 and previously healthy, died suddenly in December 1880. His death did not raise any particular comment; Catherine collected £71 (worth roughly £5764 in 2019 pounds) from the burial society with which he had been registered and he was interred shortly thereafter.

By 1882, a romance started between Margaret Flannagan and Thomas Higgins; the pair married in October of that year. Thomas's daughter Mary, aged 8, died within months of the wedding after a short illness. Once again, the burial society payout was collected upon death, this time by Margaret Higgins. In January 1883, Margaret Jennings, aged 19, also died. Her burial payout was collected by Catherine.

In the face of neighbourhood gossip about the death rate in the house, Catherine, Margaret, and Higgins (Note: Sources are unclear about the point at which Patrick Jennings left the household, but he is not among the deaths attributed to it.) moved their household to 105 Latimer Street and then again to 27 Ascot Street. In September 1883, Higgins, then 45, became yet another member of the household to fall mysteriously ill. His stomach pains were severe enough that a Doctor Whitford was called; he attributed Higgins's illness to dysentery related to drinking cheap whiskey and prescribed opium and castor oil. Higgins died after two days of illness. Days later, the same doctor was contacted and asked to provide a death certificate. He did so, attributing the death to dysentery.

== Investigation ==
Although Higgins's death by apparent dysentery raised no questions for Doctor Whitford, Higgins's brother Patrick was surprised to hear that Thomas, who had been strong and in good health, could have succumbed so easily to illness. When Patrick discovered that his brother has been insured with five different burial societies, which left his widow with a profit of around £100, he pursued the matter with the authorities. A postmortem examination was ordered on Higgins's body. To the surprise of mourners, the coroner arrived at the home to perform the examination in the middle of Higgins's wake. Catherine, upon hearing that a full autopsy was to be performed, fled the home.

When a full autopsy of Higgins's body was completed, evidence of arsenic poisoning was found: His organs showed traces of arsenic, in quantities indicating the poisoning had taken place over several days. Evidence from the home, including "a bottle containing a mystery white substance and a market pocket worn by [Margaret]" was examined by poison expert Dr Campbell Brown, who verified the presence of arsenic – dust in Margaret's pocket, and an arsenic solution (containing unusual adulterants) in the bottle. Margaret was arrested immediately; Catherine, after moving from one boarding house to another to avoid police for nearly a week, was taken into custody in Wavertree. On 16 October 1883, the sisters were formally charged with the murder of Thomas Higgins.

Orders for the exhumation of the previously deceased members of the household were issued when it became clear that arsenic was the mechanism of Higgins's death. The bodies of John Flannagan, Mary Higgins, and Margaret Jennings all showed evidence of minimal deterioration, a quality associated with arsenic poisoning, and traces of arsenic were found in the remains of all three.

Investigators initially assumed that the arsenic used to poison the victims had come from rat poison, but when common adulterants used in rat poison failed to show up in autopsies, they were forced to come up with a new theory. It was unlikely that the illiterate sisters would have been able to acquire arsenic through the usual method of visiting a chemist, a route open to doctors rather than spinsters. Eventually it was discovered that common flypaper at the time contained arsenic, and that by soaking the flypaper in water, a solution substantially identical – including the same adulterants – to that found in a bottle at the Higgins residence could be obtained.

== Aftermath ==
At the time of her arrest, Catherine claimed to her solicitor that the murders were not isolated, and provided a list of six or seven other deaths that she claimed to be killings related to burial society fraud as well as a list of five other women who had either perpetrated those murders or provided insurance to those who did.

=== Alleged conspiracy ===
Catherine's list of alleged conspirators contained three poisoners other than herself, one accomplice, and three agents of the insuring groups who had provided payouts upon the deaths. Margaret Evans, Bridget Begley, and Margaret Higgins were named as the poisoners; Margaret Potter, a Mrs Fallon, and a Bridget Stanton were the insurers; and Catherine Ryan was alleged to have obtained the arsenic needed by one of the poisoners. According to Flannagan, Evans had been the instigator of the crime ring, beginning with the murder of a mentally handicapped teenager in which Ryan obtained the poison and Evans administered it. Although Evans did not personally receive an insurance payout from this death, there were implications that she had dealings with the boy's father and may have profited from those.

The women Catherine alleged to have been involved in the conspiracy all appear often in accounts of suspicious deaths in this period; Mrs Stanton, for example, was linked to the insurance policies of three of the deaths, and groups of two or more of the involved women were seen visiting those who died shortly before their deaths. In one case, when an insurance company supervisor requested to meet Thomas Higgins in the course of issuing the insurance on him, he was greeted at his home by a woman who was neither Flannagan nor Higgins, who presented to him a "Thomas" who he later realised, upon seeing the deceased Thomas Higgins, was an impostor.

Catherine's testimony was sometimes contradictory to both herself and to what seemed to be obvious facts of the conspiracy; in one case, despite Mrs Stanton's close links to the insurance payouts of murder victims and Catherine's identification of her as part of the conspiracy, she "exonerated" Stanton after police arrested the woman. Ultimately it was decided by the prosecuting solicitor for Liverpool that while the additional deaths were likely to be murder, it would be difficult to prove that anyone other than Catherine or Margaret had committed them, especially considering that the primary evidence against the other women was being provided by Flannagan, who had every reason to attempt to minimise her own responsibility in such crimes. As a result, only the sisters were tried for the crime of murdering Thomas Higgins, despite continuing suspicion by all investigating parties that there had been more deaths than just the four within the sisters' households, and more murderers than just the two women.

=== Trial ===
At the trial in 1884, prosecutors implicated Catherine and Margaret in the three other deaths in their household as well as that of Higgins, with which they were officially charged. Catherine's offer to provide evidence against other conspirators for the prosecution in exchange for leniency was refused. The sisters were found guilty and sentenced to be hanged. They were executed on 3 March 1884 at Kirkdale Prison after they were attended to by a Roman Catholic priest. The deaths were witnessed by a reported 1,000 people.

== In media ==
Contemporary accounts of the Flannagan sisters referred to them as "disciple[s] of Lucrezia Borgia", or as "the Borgias of the Slums", in reference to their use of poison and the tales of how Borgia had been known to do the same. Modern accounts of the sisters, such as those by Angela Brabin and the television series Deadly Women, have focused more on the cooperative aspect of the crimes rather than the poison aspect, and tend to refer to them as "black widows" or "The Black Widows of Liverpool", particularly in reference to the allegation that the Flannagan sisters were part of a larger murder ring. Wax effigies of Flannagan and Higgins were placed in Madame Tussaud's Chamber of Horrors after their executions.

A radio dramatization of the murders and following events titled Life Assurance, written by Chrissie Gittens based on the book The Black Widows of Liverpool by Angela Brabin (Palatine Books, 2003 ISBN 978-1-874181-21-7/2nd Revised Edition 2009 ISBN 978-1874181606) and directed by Claire Grove, was broadcast on BBC Radio 4 in 2005, with Sorcha Cusack as Catherine Flanagan, Gillian Kearney as Ellen Flanagan, Anny Tobin as Margaret Higgins, Robert Hastie as Inspector Keighley, Stephen Hogan as Thomas Higgins, Hugh Dickson as Dr. Whitford and Nicholas Boulton as Patrick Jennings.

== See also ==
- Black Widow Murders
- List of serial killers with the nickname "Borgia"
