= Hardscrabble, Ohio =

Unincorporated community in Ohio, U.S.

Coordinates: 40°16′30″N 81°49′34″W

Hardscrabble is a former settlement in Coshocton County, in the U.S. state of Ohio.

Hardscrabble was a coal mining site established in 1833, one of the first coal mines in Coshocton County. Further mines at Hardscrabble opened in 1868 and mining activity continued until about the early 1880's. The site today is a semi-rural area on the eastern outskirts of Coshocton.
