= Peket =

Belgian fruit brandy

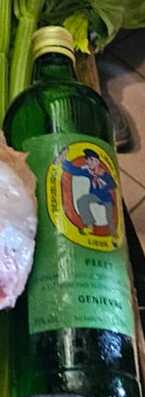
A bottle of peket

Peket, also pékèt or pèket is an eau de vie (fruit brandy) aromatised with juniper berries, it is the Walloon name for Dutch gin. The drink originates from Belgium and its name is derived from the Walloon word for juniper.

== Etymology ==
The word “peket” means “prickly” in old Walloon. Other sources tell that this word was used by miners. The name comes from the Walloon word pèke, meaning juniper berry.

== Folklore ==
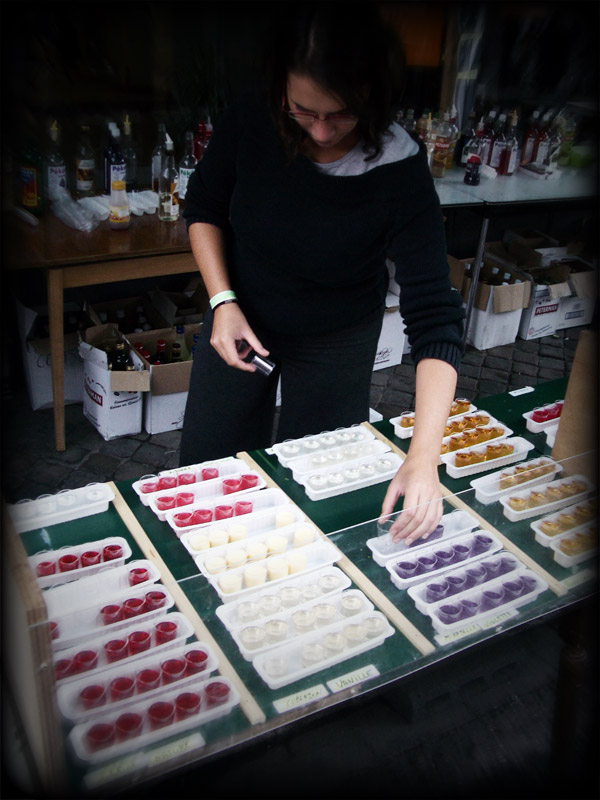
Peket stall in Liège, 15 August 2006

Peket is commonly consumed during the celebrations of August 15 in the Outremeuse quarter of Liège and also during the Walloon Festivities that take place every year in Namur.

Several local recipes use peket, for example quail and duck are sometimes cooked with it. Smoked fish or strong cheese, such as Herve cheese are popular accompaniments.

Peket is traditionally sold in one-litre clay bottles, but some sell it in glass bottles. It is sometimes mixed with Coca-Cola to produce a cocktail known as "white coke".
