= Keith Clay and Shannon Thomas =

Executed American murderers

Keith Clay
- Born: February 18, 1968; Harris County, Texas, U.S.
- Died: March 20, 2003 (aged 35); Huntsville Unit, Texas, U.S
- Status: Executed by lethal injection
- Conviction: Capital murder
- Penalty: Death

Details
- Victims: 4 (three as an accomplice)
- Country: United States
- State: Texas

Shannon Thomas
- Born: July 27, 1971; Harris County, Texas, U.S.
- Died: November 16, 2005 (aged 34); Huntsville Unit, Texas, U.S.
- Status: Executed by lethal injection
- Conviction: Capital murder
- Penalty: Death

Details
- Victims: 4 (one as an accomplice)
- Country: United States
- State: Texas

Keith Bernard Clay (February 18, 1968 – March 20, 2003) and Shannon Charles Thomas (July 27, 1971 – November 16, 2005) were American convicted serial killers and mass murderers who killed a total of four people between December 1993 and January 1994. Thomas was convicted of the Christmas Eve, 1993 murders of 32-year-old Roberto Rios and his two children: 10-year-old Maria Rios and her 11-year-old brother, Victor Rios, in their Baytown, Texas home. Clay had also been present during the killings and confessed to attacking Roberto. Clay was convicted of the 1994 murder of a gas station clerk, during which Thomas was present. The killing occurred less than two weeks after the Rios family murders. Both were executed by lethal injection by the U.S. state of Texas, in 2003 and 2005, respectively.

== Crimes ==
Thomas and Clay's intention on Christmas Eve was to rob 32-year-old Roberto Rios, a small-time marijuana and cocaine dealer, of his drugs and money. In the early afternoon, Rios was duct taped to a chair, severely beaten, tortured with a pair of shears, shot twice in the head, and stabbed in the neck with a steak knife. Thomas then went upstairs to a bedroom where Rios's two children were: 10-year-old Maria Rios and her 11-year-old brother, Victor Rios. He shot them both point-blank in the head through a pillow as they lay on the floor. It appears that the motive for the killings of the children was the elimination of witnesses.

Police were unable to solve the crime for over a year until they arrested one of Thomas's friends who gave information that linked Thomas and Clay to the murders. Additionally, a postal worker and friend of the Rios's testified they had seen a "beige-looking, maybe white" car in front of the house. Clay owned a white Cadillac with tinted windows which he reported stolen after the murders.

== Trials and appeals ==
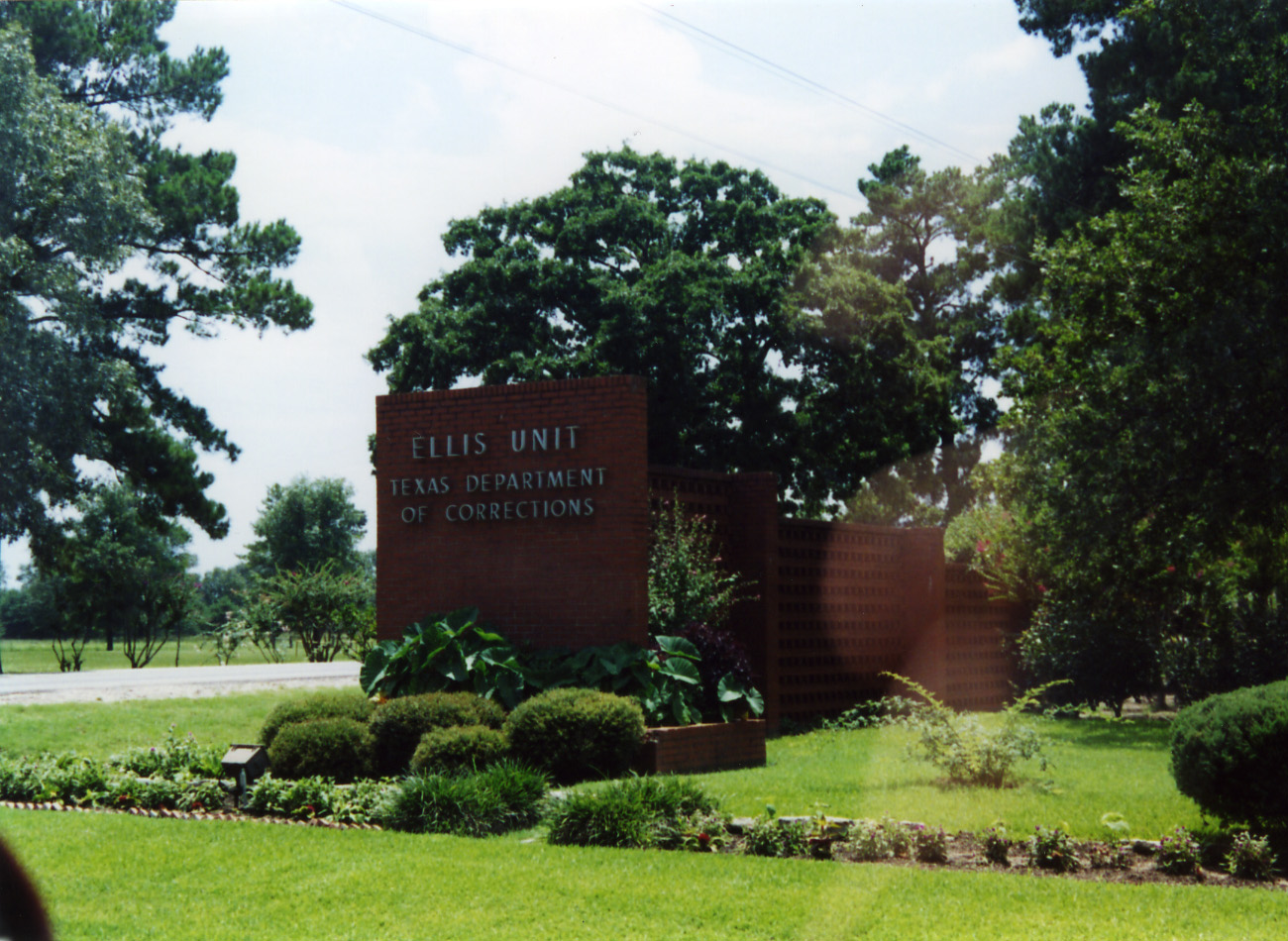
Ellis Unit, where Clay and Thomas were initially confined

During Thomas's trial, it was revealed that he had also taken part in a robbery on January 4, 1994, where Keith Clay shot Melathethil Tom Varughese, a clerk at a Texaco gas station.

Thomas had previous criminal convictions to his name. He was on probation for delivery of a controlled substance and had served time in a Harris County, Texas boot camp for assault.

After being convicted of the two children's murders, Thomas was sentenced to death by a jury on November 8, 1996. The conviction and sentence were then affirmed by the Texas Court of Criminal Appeals after an automatic appeal required in all death penalty cases in Texas. An appeal for writ of habeas corpus was denied on November 24, 1998, by the Court of Criminal Appeals. Appeals to a U.S. district court were also denied and an application for a certificate of appealability was denied in the United States Court of Appeals for the Fifth Circuit on October 11, 2004. Thomas did not file a clemency petition with the Texas Board of Pardons and Paroles.

Thomas' defense claimed that although the postal worker said that he saw two men at the Rios' home on the day of the murders, it was only under hypnosis that he identified Thomas as one of those men. Thomas continued to contend that he was completely innocent of the murders and that evidence against him was purely circumstantial.

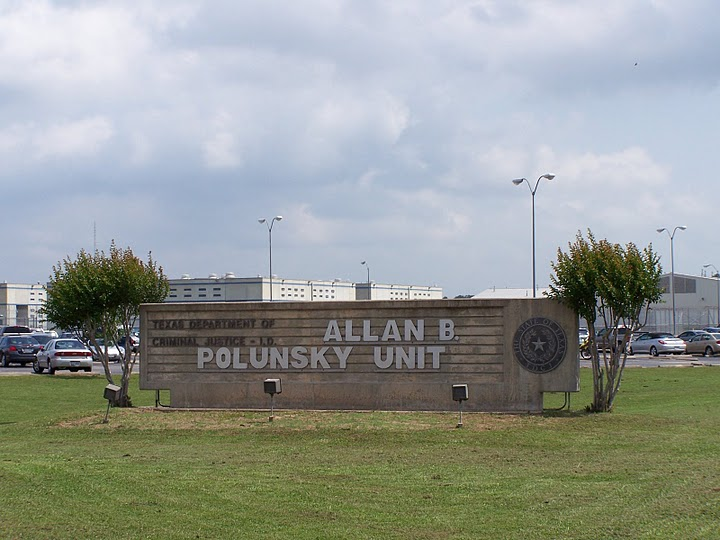
Clay and Thomas were moved to the Allan B. Polunsky Unit

Shannon Charles Thomas, Texas Department of Criminal Justice (TDCJ) Death Row#999213, was received by the TDCJ on December 4, 1996. He was held in the death row in the Ellis Unit until 1999, when the death row moved to the Polunsky Unit.

== Executions ==
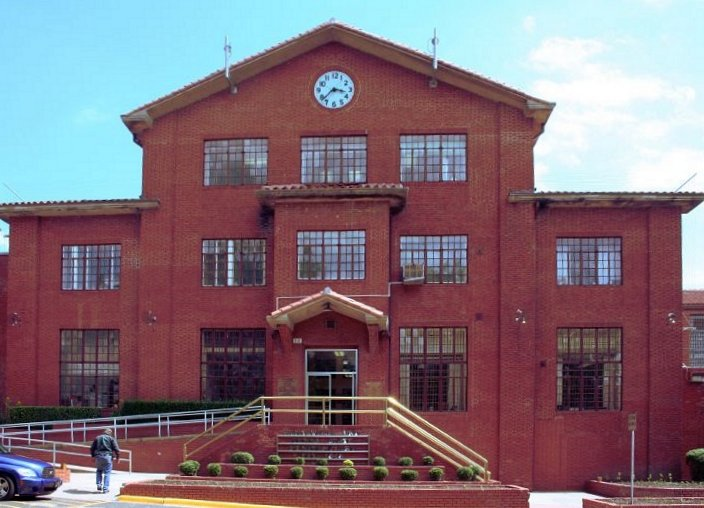
Huntsville Unit, where Clay and Thomas died

Clay was executed on March 20, 2003, for the murder of Melathethil Tom Varughese.

Thomas was executed on November 16, 2005. No member of the Rios' family witnessed the execution. Thomas requested that his sister and a friend witness for him. Thomas requested no last meal.

In his final statement, Thomas said:

"Yes. Man, I just want you to know how much I love them. I want you to be strong and get through this time. Do not fall back. Keep going forward. Don't let this hinder you. Let everybody know I love them (several names listed), Kevin - as well as everyone else in the family. Tell them that I love them and stay strong. This is kind of hard to put words together; I am nervous and it is hard to put my thoughts together. Sometimes you don't know what to say; I hope these words give you comfort. I don't know what to say. I want you to know I love you; just stay strong and don't give up. Let everybody know I love them…and love is unconditional, as Mama has always told us. I may be gone in the flesh, but I am always with you in spirit. I love you."

As the drugs started taking effect, Thomas asked, "Is the mic still on?" He was told that it was, but then he lost consciousness.

His execution was delayed shortly by a late appeal that was denied by the Supreme Court of the United States. He was pronounced dead at 6:52 p.m. CST after being executed by lethal injection at the Huntsville Unit, Huntsville, Texas.

It was the 996th execution in the United States since the Gregg v. Georgia decision in 1976.

== See also ==
- Capital punishment in Texas
- Capital punishment in the United States
- List of people executed in Texas, 2000–2009
- List of people executed in the United States in 2003
- List of people executed in the United States in 2005

Executions carried out in Texas
Preceded by Bobby Glen Cook March 11, 2003	Keith Clay; March 20, 2003	Succeeded by James Blake Colburn March 26, 2003
Executions carried out in the United States
Preceded by Walanzo Deon Robinson – Oklahoma March 18, 2003	Keith Clay – Texas; March 20, 2003	Succeeded by John Michael Hooker – Oklahoma March 25, 2003
Executions carried out in Texas
Preceded by Robert Dale Rowell November 15, 2005	Shannon Thomas; November 16, 2005	Succeeded by Marion Butler Dudley January 25, 2006
Executions carried out in the United States
Preceded by Robert Dale Rowell – Texas November 15, 2005	Shannon Thomas – Texas; November 16, 2005	Succeeded by Elias Hanna Syriani – North Carolina November 18, 2005
