= Riley Dobi Noel =

American murderer (1972–2003)

- Born: May 22, 1972; Arkansas, U.S.
- Died: July 9, 2003 (aged 31); Cummins Unit, Arkansas, U.S.
- Status: Executed by lethal injection
- Motive: Mistaken identity Revenge
- Convictions: Capital murder (3 counts); Attempted capital murder First degree battery Robbery; Theft by receiving Second degree escape Habitual offender
- Penalty: Death

Details
- Victims: 3
- Date: June 4, 1995
- Weapons: .45-caliber semi-automatic pistol Mossberg 12-gauge shotgun

Riley Dobi Noel (May 22, 1972 – July 9, 2003) was an American convicted murderer who was executed for the June 1995 murders of Marcell Young, Mustafa Hussian, and Malak Hussian in Varner, Arkansas.

== Murder ==
On June 4, 1995, Noel, accompanied by Terry Carroll, Curtis Cochran, and Tracy Calloway, were out driving in Little Rock, Arkansas in Cochran's car while getting high on drugs. A week prior, Noel's brother had been killed in a drive-by shooting, and Noel believed that a daughter of a woman he knew was involved and had set up his brother. Seeking revenge, Noel and his acquaintances headed to the home of the woman; Mary Hussian. Once the group arrived at Hussian's home, Noel ordered three of Hussian's children to get down on the floor.

After they did, Noel shot each of the children in the head. He killed 17-year-old Marcell Young, 12-year-old Mustafa Hussian, and 10-year-old Malak Hussian. In another part of the house, Carroll tried to shoot Mary Hussian with a shotgun, however, the gun jammed, and Mary was able to wrestle it away from him. The daughter who Noel suspected was involved in his brother's death was not at the residence during the murders.

== Trial ==
On July 5, 1995, Noel was charged with capital murder in the deaths of Marcell Young, Mustafa Hussian, and Malak Hussian. He was also charged with the attempted capital murder of Mary Hussian. On July 18, 1996, he was sentenced to death.

In exchange for leniency, Cochran pleaded guilty to first degree murder and testified against his co-defendants. He received a 20-year sentence and has since been paroled. Calloway was convicted of three counts of first degree murder and received a 132-year sentence. She will become eligible for parole in 2032. Carroll was convicted of capital murder and sentenced to life without parole. Because he was a juvenile at the time, his sentence was later reduced to 70 years.

== Execution ==
On July 9, 2003, Noel was executed via lethal injection at the Cummins Unit. His last meal consisted of fried chicken, mashed potatoes with gravy, hot rolls, a green garden salad with ranch dressing, Kool-Aid, and cookies.

A media witness noted that Noel's chest heaved violently within 20 seconds of the lethal injection procedure. The witness reported that it was the most intense execution he had ever witnessed.

== See also ==
- List of people executed in Arkansas
- List of people executed in the United States in 2003

Executions carried out in Arkansas
Preceded by Clay King Smith May 8, 2001	Riley Dobi Noel; July 9, 2003	Succeeded by Charles Singleton January 6, 2004
Executions carried out in the United States
Preceded by Christopher Black Sr. – Texas July 9, 2003	Riley Dobi Noel – Arkansas; July 9, 2003	Succeeded by Bryan Toles – Oklahoma July 22, 2003
