= Larry Allen Hayes =

Executed American spree killer (1948–2003)

- Born: November 23, 1948; West Plains, Missouri, U.S.
- Died: September 10, 2003 (aged 54); Huntsville Unit, Texas, U.S.
- Status: Executed by lethal injection
- Conviction: Capital murder
- Penalty: Death (May 17, 2000)

Details
- Victims: 2
- Date: July 15, 1999
- Country: United States
- State: Texas

Larry Allen Hayes (November 23, 1948 – September 10, 2003) was an American spree killer who was executed in Texas for the murders of two women in Montgomery County. On July 15, 1999, Hayes shot and killed his wife, 46-year-old Mary Hayes, at their Woodloch home, then drove to a nearby convenience store and fatally shot the clerk, 18-year-old Rosalyn Robinson. Hayes was convicted of capital murder, waived all appeals, and was executed via lethal injection in 2003. His execution drew attention as it was noted by the Associated Press that he was the first white person to be executed in Texas for killing a black person since 1854.

== Early life ==
Hayes was born on November 23, 1948, in West Plains, Missouri. He grew up in Howell County and attended Southwest Missouri State University for a year and a half. In the 1970s, he served time in Missouri State Penitentiary for a drug conviction. He had been sentenced to seven years for possession of Barbiturates, however, he was confined for only nine months and paroled in 1976. The sentence was ultimately overturned two years later. Hayes later moved to Texas and had a conviction for driving while under the influence of drugs in Galveston County.

== Murders ==
On July 15, 1999, at his home in Woodloch, Larry Hayes shot and killed his wife of 14 years, 46-year-old Mary Evelyn Hayes. In the days leading up to her murder, Larry had argued and fought with her repeatedly. He finally snapped when he learned she had been having an affair. Larry shot Mary with a .44 caliber pistol a total of seven times. Two of the shots were fired at close range, and three shots were to the head. His own mother and daughter were in the house during the shooting and his daughter fled to a neighbor's house after the killing. Hayes reloaded his gun, kissed his mother, and then left the home in his wife's truck.

Hayes drove to a convenience store in Grangerland. Wanting another vehicle, Hayes entered the store and encountered the clerk, 18-year-old Rosalyn Ann Robinson, who was black. Hayes pointed the gun at her and ordered her to follow him outside. The store security camera captured the encounter and showed Hayes holding a gun to Robinson's head and ordering her out of the store and into her car. As the two prepared to leave, a customer approached in a vehicle and distracted Hayes. Robinson used the opportunity to try and escape. Hayes shot her as she attempted to flee, then fatally shot her at point-blank range in the head. The killing was captured on surveillance video. The customer called the police as Hayes fled in Robinson's car. He later abandoned her car and stole a pickup truck.

A few hours later, Hayes was spotted by two Polk County police officers at a truck stop in Goodrich. He refused to surrender and was shot by police after pointing his gun at them. Hayes was shot in the back and chest but managed to survive.

== Trial ==
Hayes was convicted of capital murder. On May 10, 2000, a jury took less than ninety minutes to find him guilty. On May 17, he was sentenced to death for the capital murder of Mary Hayes and Rosalyn Robinson. On July 6, he chose to waive all his appeals and just allow his execution to proceed.

== Execution ==
On September 10, 2003, Hayes was executed via lethal injection at the Huntsville Unit in Huntsville, Texas.

His execution drew attention because it marked the first time in modern Texas state history that a white person was executed for killing a black person. Prior to this, the last time a white person was executed in Texas for killing a black person was in 1854, when James Wilson was executed for killing a white man's slave, meaning the punishment was essentially for a property crime.

Although Hayes was executed for killing a black person, only one of his victims (Robinson) was black, and the other victim (Mary Hayes) was white. In 2011, David R. Dow of The New York Times argued that Hayes's execution should not count as a white-on-black execution because there were two victims in his case and one of them was white. In June 2011, white death row inmate Lee Taylor was executed for the 1999 murder of a black prisoner. While some news agencies labeled Taylor's execution as the second time in Texas state history that a white person was executed for killing a black person, Dow claimed it should be labeled as the first, because there were no other white victims in the Taylor case.

== See also ==
- List of people executed by lethal injection
- List of people executed in Texas, 2000–2009
- List of people executed in the United States in 2003
- List of white defendants executed for killing a black victim
- Race and capital punishment in the United States
