= Odell Barnes (criminal) =

American murderer

Odell Barnes Jr.
- Born: March 22, 1968; Wichita County, Texas, U.S.
- Died: March 1, 2000 (aged 31); Huntsville Unit, Texas, U.S.
- Occupation: Construction worker
- Status: Executed by lethal injection
- Convictions: Capital murder Aggravated sexual assault (2 counts); Aggravated robbery Robbery (4 counts); Burglary
- Penalty: Death

Odell Barnes Jr. (March 22, 1968 – March 1, 2000) was a Texas man convicted of the 1989 murder of Helen Bass. During the later stages of his legal appeals, human rights groups and anti-death penalty advocates raised questions about his murder conviction, leading to international media attention and diplomatic protests from the government of France. However, Barnes was ultimately executed on March 1, 2000.

== Murder and conviction ==
The murder occurred on November 29, 1989, in Wichita Falls, Texas. Bass, 42, was surprised by Barnes, who had broken into her home while at work, then robbed, beaten, stabbed, and killed by a headshot. She may have also been raped.

Barnes's conviction was based on forensic evidence and witness testimony placing him at the crime scene. His fingerprints were on a bedside lamp that was used to bludgeon Bass, traces of his semen were present at the scene, and two patches of blood on his clothing were confirmed by DNA analysis to have been hers. Prosecution witnesses described seeing Barnes trespassing in Bass's yard about one hour before she returned from work. When Barnes was arrested for attempting to rape a pregnant woman on December 1, 1989, he had a .32 caliber pistol belonging to Bass.

Barnes had two prior felony convictions and was linked to a total of eight crimes, including five robberies, two rapes, and a burglary. At the time of the Bass murder, he was on parole serving 19 months of a 10-year prison term for robbery. He had been unable to afford his lawyers, and the Wichita County Public Defender's office was not equipped to handle his case, so two local attorneys were appointed for him. Their budget and preparation were minimal, no defense investigation was conducted, and no forensic tests were ordered by the defense. Barnes was convicted by the jury after three hours of deliberation.

At the sentencing phase, the state introduced evidence of the other crimes that Barnes had committed. In February 1987, he broke in to a home, beat a woman over the head with a tire iron, threatened her with a gun, threatened to kill her daughter, raped her, and then burglarized her home. On May 18, 1987, Barnes robbed a Golden Fried Chicken restaurant; three days later, he robbed a McDonald's. On January 20, 1988, while on probation for the robberies, Barnes robbed a Domino's with a toy gun. In each of these cases, Barnes threatened to kill victims unless they cooperated. On November 15, 1989, Barnes tried to choke and rape a woman who was nine months pregnant. Barnes threatened to kill her if she did not stop screaming, but she managed to escape. Barnes was later convicted of both of the rapes, receiving 99 years in case and a life sentence in the other. DNA evidence linked him to both cases.

Barnes is also the prime suspect in the unsolved rape and murder of 46-year-old Harriette Tetreault on November 26, 1987.

Barnes admitted to the other crimes for which he'd been convicted. He admitted stealing money to support a crack addiction and that he'd ruined almost every chance he'd be given to fix his life. However, he denied the murder, saying, "I'm no angel. but I didn't do this."

== Appeals process ==
During Barnes' appeals process, two new attorneys were appointed to his case by a federal court. European anti-death penalty activists contributed some $16,000 to his defense fund, and the new lawyers paid for forensic tests out of their pocket. The new defense team uncovered deficiencies in the forensic evidence, serious errors and oversights by the original defense team, and problems with the credibility of prosecution witnesses.

- Barnes claimed at trial that he had never had sexual contact, consensual or forced, with Bass. However, DNA testing after the trial revealed that the semen on her corpse was his. Barnes then claimed that he and Bass had an existing sexual relationship before the crime. Still, on the advice of his original defense team, he did not tell the jury.
- At trial, the jury heard that a brand new lamp was found with Barnes's fingerprints. The new defense investigation found that the lamp had not been new and that Barnes had visited Bass's house after she had bought it.
- The bloodstains found on Barnes's clothing, confirmed by DNA as Bass's blood, were very small. This was inconsistent with the extremely violent nature of the killing, and the amount of blood found at the scene. Tests revealed that the bloodstains contained an extremely high level of citric acid, which is used as a preservative in crime labs.
- The prosecution witness who identified Barnes trespassing at Bass's residence had given inconsistent testimony on different occasions. He described seeing Barnes some 45 minutes after Bass had already returned home.

== International attention ==
Barnes was executed on March 1, 2000. His last meal request was not a meal at all; all he wanted was "Justice, Equality, World Peace." His final statement was:

I'd like to send great love to all my family members, my supporters, my attorneys. They have all supported me throughout this. I thank you for proving my innocence, although it has not been acknowledged by the courts. May you continue in the struggle and may you change all that's being done here today and in the past. Life has not been that good to me, but I believe that now, after meeting so many people who support me in this, that all things will come to an end, and may this be fruit of better judgements for the future. That's all I have to say.

== See also ==
- List of people executed in Texas, 2000–2009
- List of people executed in the United States in 2000
