= Daniel Hittle =

Executed American serial killer and mass murderer

- Born: Daniel Joe Hittle; March 1, 1950; Perry County, Indiana, U.S.
- Died: December 6, 2000 (aged 50); Huntsville Unit, Huntsville, Texas, U.S.
- Cause of death: Execution by lethal injection
- Convictions: Minnesota; Second degree murder (2 counts); Texas; Capital murder
- Penalty: Minnesota; 30 years imprisonment Texas; Death

Details
- Victims: 7
- Span of crimes: 1973–1989
- Country: United States
- States: Minnesota, Texas
- Date apprehended: November 15, 1989

Daniel Joe Hittle (March 1, 1950 – December 6, 2000) was an American serial killer, spree killer, and mass murderer who shot and killed five people, including a police officer, during a rampage in Dallas and Garland, Texas in 1989. At the time, he was on parole for the 1973 murders of his adoptive parents in Motley, Minnesota. For his crimes in Texas, Hittle was sentenced to death and subsequently executed in 2000.

== Early life and parricide ==
Daniel Joe Hittle was born on March 1, 1950, in Perry County, Indiana, but was adopted at an early age by Henry and Margaret Hittle, a couple who later moved to a small farm in Motley, Minnesota. While not much is known about his upbringing, friends and acquaintances of Hittle described him as a quiet, polite man who could not stand being teased and became violent when drunk. His best friend from high school, Gary Wentworth, later revealed in a press interview that Hittle developed a festering hatred for his religious stepmother, as he considered her an overbearing and overly strict person, which was not aided by the fact that Hittle had developed an addiction to hard drugs. Behind closed doors, his ex-wives and girlfriends said that he was often physically and verbally abusive to both them and their children and would often torture and kill stray animals. In one incident, one of his wives said that he shot a neighbor's dog for barking at him. In another case, he decided to kill the family dog since he thought it was killing other farm animals. To do so, he tied it to a tree, shot it with his shotgun, and then left the corpse tied to it.

On April 4, 1973, Hittle, angry that his adoptive parents' dog had supposedly scratched his truck, started arguing with his stepmother, Margaret. During the scuffle, she allegedly said that he did not dare to shoot her, only for Hittle to retrieve his shotgun and immediately do so. While attempting to reach for his own firearm, Henry was also shot and killed on the spot. The incident was immediately reported to the police by alarmed neighbors, with authorities quickly arriving on the scene and arresting Hittle. His adoptive parents' bodies were found lying just inside the front door of the house. Hittle was subsequently charged with two counts of first-degree murder, and a $15,000 bond was placed. He pleaded guilty to two counts of second-degree murder and received two concurrent 30-year sentences, to be served at the Minnesota Correctional Facility – Stillwater.

== Parole, move to Texas, and killing spree ==
In the same month as Hittle's trial was taking place, a bill proposed and sponsored by State Representative James E. Ulland was passed which mandated that convicts serving at least a 20-year sentence may be eligible for parole without needing to serve the minimum sentence, provided that they were model inmates. As he qualified for early release under the provisions of this bill, Hittle was paroled in 1984 and was allowed to move to Garland, Texas, where he was kept under surveillance by authorities.

Hittle continued to habitually use drugs, supplied by his drug dealer, 39-year-old Mary Goss. Hittle and Goss sometimes got into arguments over debts, and she had him arrested for slashing her tires. On November 15, 1989, after being thrown out of a party and getting into an argument with his wife, an enraged Hittle grabbed his 20-gauge shotgun and stormed out of the house, got in his truck and began driving towards Goss' house. On the way, he was stopped by 48-year-old police officer Gerald Ray Walker, who pulled him over for driving over the speed limit. Fearful that Walker would notice his loaded gun in the back, Hittle pulled it out and shot the officer in the chest before speeding away, leaving Walker to slowly succumb to his injuries. After he arrived at Goss' house, he burst through the door and opened fire, killing Goss and two of her friends: 36-year-old Richard Joseph Cook and 19-year-old Raymong Scott Gregg. He then noticed Goss' 4-year-old daughter, Christy Condon, and after reloading his shotgun with new ammunition, he proceeded to shoot her in the face.

== Arrest, trial, and imprisonment ==
Unbeknownst to Hittle, an off-duty firefighter, who was at the traffic stop where Walker had been, had called for help using the officer's mobile radio. Hittle attempted to escape, but crashed his truck and then started a gunfight with authorities, only to surrender when he ran out of ammunition. Upon inspecting the Goss house, authorities noticed that Condon was still alive and drove her to the Baylor University Medical Center. Despite surviving her initial injuries, the girl was soon declared brain dead. Her surviving family members agreed to have the life-support system turned off, and consented to her organs being donated for science.

After being treated for minor injuries suffered during the shootout, Hittle was interned at the Garland City Jail on $250,000 bail, where he was charged with capital murder and three counts of attempted capital murder with the police-related shootings. After a several-months long trial, Hittle was convicted by jury verdict on all counts in August 1990, and subsequently sentenced to death. Due to his death sentence, it was decided that he would not be tried for the other deaths. Throughout the proceedings, Hittle was noted for his carefree and seemingly happy demeanor, with some witnesses testifying that he had bragged about his parents' murders and had spoken of killing police officers in the past.

Over the following years, Hittle unsuccessfully attempted to appeal his sentence to both the state and federal courts, only for his death sentence to be upheld at each venue. On January 10, 1994, his final appeal to the Supreme Court of the United States was denied, effectively cementing his death sentence.

== Execution ==
On December 6, 2000, Hittle was executed via lethal injection at the Huntsville Unit. His last statement was "Sant Ajaib Singh. That's it", referencing the Indian guru Ajaib Singh. His execution was attended by several witnesses, including Gerald Walker's widow and another police officer, with the former releasing a statement thanking the state of Texas for carrying out the procedure.

== See also ==
- Capital punishment in Texas
- List of people executed by lethal injection
- List of people executed in Texas, 2000–2009
- List of people executed in the United States in 2000
- List of serial killers in the United States
