= Murder of Caren Koslow =

American murder

On March 12, 1992, in the Rivercrest area of Fort Worth, Texas, United States, intruders attacked Jack Koslow and Caren Courtney Koslow, a husband and wife, in their house. Caren Koslow's throat was slashed, killing her, while Jack escaped the house and survived.

== Crime ==
Authorities initially suspected Jack Koslow. They ultimately found that two people, Jeffrey Dillingham and Brian Dennis Salter, had attacked the Koslows, with Dillingham beating them and Salter slashing their throats. After the attack they stole a wristwatch worth $1,600 and $200 in cash from a wallet.

Kristi Anne Koslow, the daughter of Jack Koslow and stepdaughter of Caren Koslow, had conspired with Dillingham and Salter in order to get inheritance money. Kristi had provided them with the alarm codes so they could sneak into the Koslow residence. Kristi Koslow had promised them $1 million if they carried out the attack.

== Background ==
At the time of the murder, Jack Koslow, a helicopter pilot, was 48. Caren Koslow, a member of a family of petroleum businesspeople, was 40. Kristi Koslow was 17. Mike Cochran of the Associated Press stated that the Koslows were at the "periphery" of the "social whirl" of Fort Worth.

Dillingham, born March 6, 1973, was an employee at a video store. Salter was born on April 30, 1972. Dillingham and Salter were both 19 years old at the time of the murder. Salter was the boyfriend of Kristi Koslow.

== Legal consequences ==
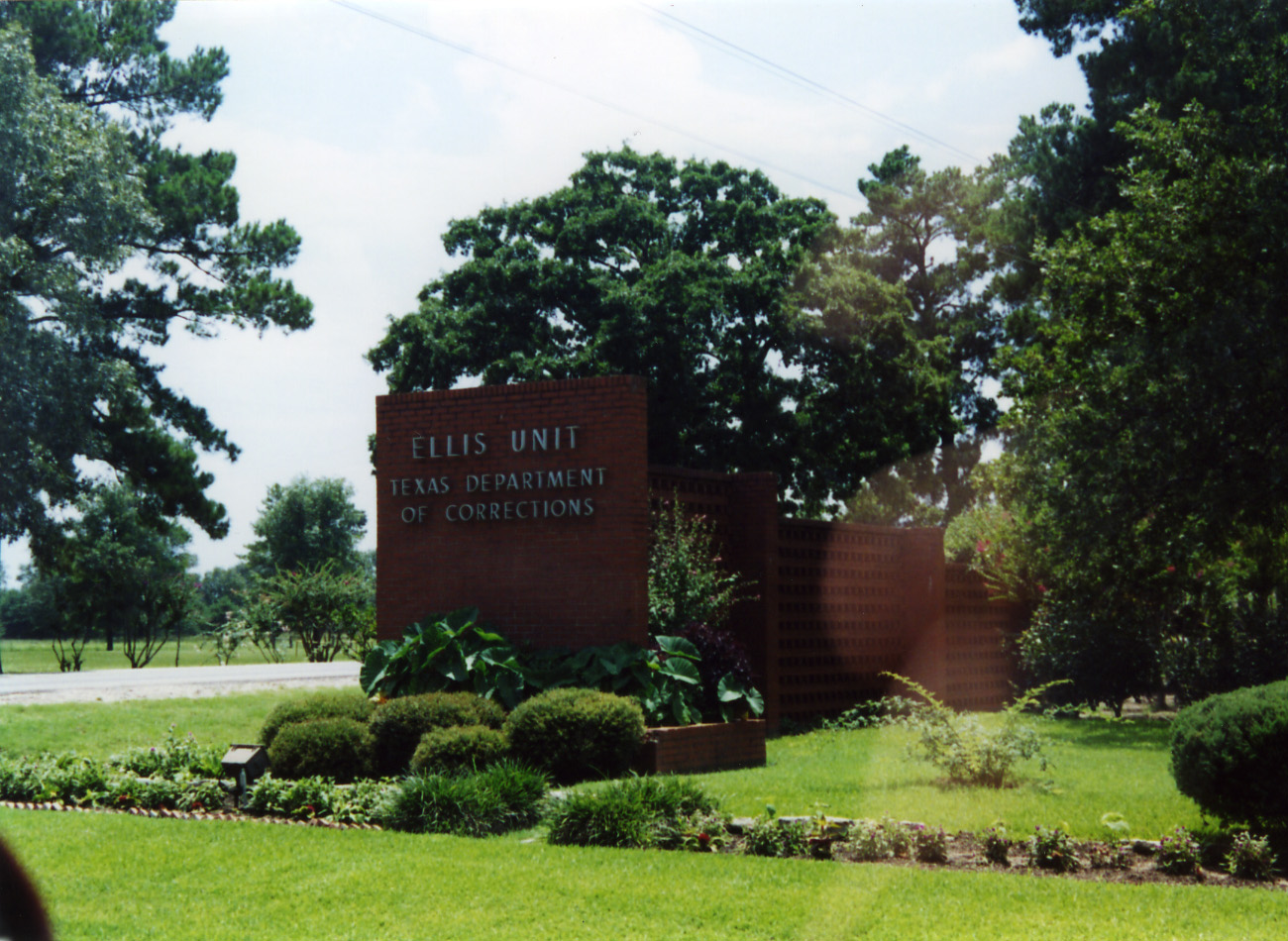
The Ellis Unit housed the State of Texas death row for men until mid-1999.

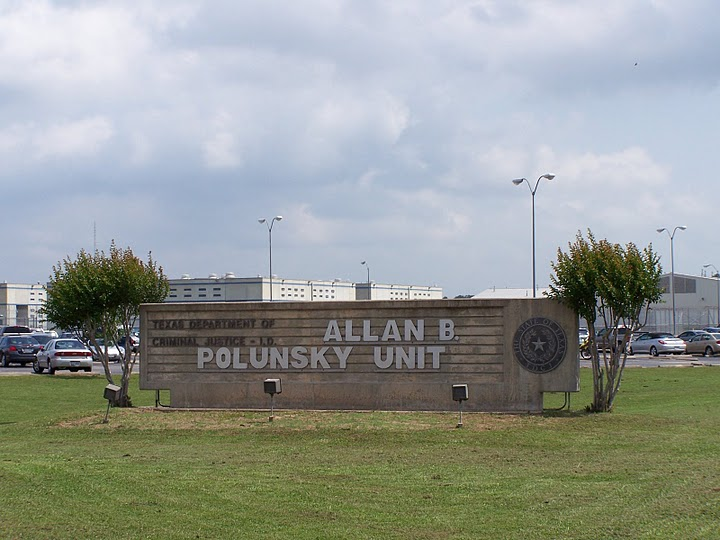
Allan B. Polunsky Unit houses the State of Texas death row for men.

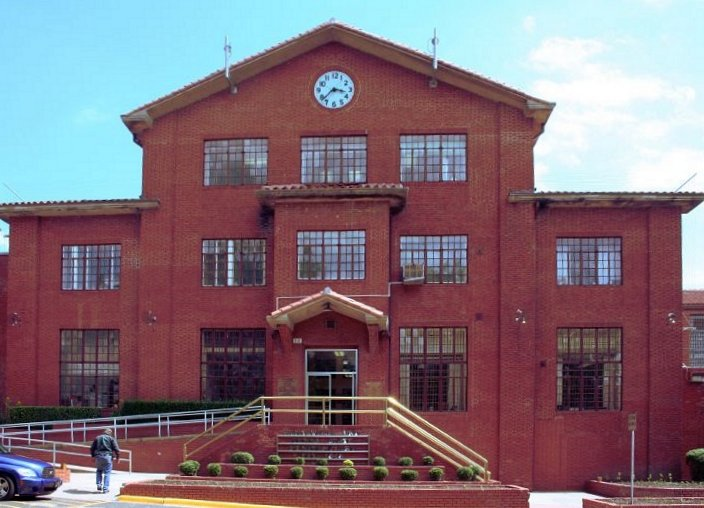
Huntsville Unit, where Jeffrey Dillingham was put to death

Salter and Dillingham were both offered plea agreements for life in prison with parole eligibility after 35 years for capital murder in exchange for testifying against Koslow. Salter accepted the deal, but Dillingham did not. He was later found guilty and sentenced to death. In 1994, Kristi Koslow was convicted of capital murder, but received a life sentence after the jury could not agree on a death sentence.

Dillingham, Texas Department of Criminal Justice (TDCJ) #999071, was received by the prison system on August 31, 1993, at age 20. Dillingham was initially located in the Ellis Unit, but was transferred to the Allan B. Polunsky Unit (formerly the Terrell Unit) in 1999. The site of his execution was the Huntsville Unit. Dillingham was executed at age 27, by lethal injection, on November 1, 2000.

As of 2018, Kristi Koslow, TDCJ #00677795, is located at the Hobby Unit. Salter, TDCJ #00678090, is located at the Alfred Hughes Unit.

== Aftermath ==
The Fort Worth Library maintains a collection of newspaper clippings related to this case under "Koslow, Kristi". Due to the prominence of the case, in 2015 Tarrant County authorities chose to keep the paper court documents of the case as historical documents even though they have been digitized. Jack Koslow died on October 31, 2023.

The case was documented in "Family Plot," Episode 6 of Season 7 of Power, Privilege & Justice and “Please Kill For Me,” Episode 12 of Season 3 of Killer Kids and in the Season 15 episode 8 of Snapped: Killer Couples.

== See also ==
- Capital punishment in Texas
- Capital punishment in the United States
- List of people executed in Texas, 2000–2009
- List of people executed in the United States in 2000
