= List of people executed in the United States in 2003 =

Sixty-five people, all male, were executed in the United States in 2003, sixty-four by lethal injection and one by electrocution. Twenty-four of them were carried out in Texas. Scott Hain became the last juvenile offender to be executed in the United States before Roper v. Simmons, which banned capital punishment nationwide for anyone under the age of eighteen.

== List of people executed in the United States in 2003 ==
No.	Date of execution	Name	Age of person			Gender	Ethnicity	State	Method	Ref.
No.	Date of execution	Name	At execution	At offense	Age difference	Gender	Ethnicity	State	Method	Ref.
1	January 14, 2003	Samuel Clark Gallamore	31	21	10	Male	White	Texas	Lethal injection	
2	January 15, 2003	John Richard Baltazar	30	25	5	Male	Hispanic	Texas	Lethal injection	
3	January 16, 2003	Daniel Juan Revilla	34	18	16	Male	White	Oklahoma	Lethal injection	
4	January 22, 2003	Robert Andrew Lookingbill	37	24	13	Male	White	Texas	Lethal injection	
5	January 28, 2003	Alva Eziel Curry	33	22	11	Male	Black	Texas	Lethal injection	
6	January 29, 2003	Richard Eugene Dinkins	40	27	13	Male	White	Texas	Lethal injection	
7	January 30, 2003	Granville Riddle	33	19	14	Male	White	Texas	Lethal injection	
8	February 4, 2003	John William Elliot	42	26	16	Male	Hispanic	Texas	Lethal injection	
9	February 5, 2003	Kenneth Kenley	42	23	19	Male	White	Missouri	Lethal injection	
10	February 6, 2003	Henry Earl Dunn Jr.	28	19	9	Male	Black	Texas	Lethal injection	
11	February 12, 2003	Richard Edwin Fox	47	33	14	Male	White	Ohio	Lethal injection	
12	February 13, 2003	Bobby Joe Fields	39	29	10	Male	Black	Oklahoma	Lethal injection	
13	February 25, 2003	Richard Head Williams	33	27	6	Male	Black	Texas	Lethal injection	
14	February 26, 2003	Amos Lee King Jr.	48	22	26	Male	Black	Florida	Lethal injection	
15	March 11, 2003	Bobby Glen Cook	41	31	10	Male	White	Texas	Lethal injection	
16	March 13, 2003	Michael Eugene Thompson	43	25	18	Male	White	Alabama	Lethal injection	
17	March 18, 2003	Louis Jones Jr.	53	44	9	Male	Black	Federal government	Lethal injection	
18	March 18, 2003	Walanzo Deon Robinson	31	18	13	Male	Black	Oklahoma	Lethal injection	
19	March 20, 2003	Keith Bernard Clay	35	25	10	Male	Black	Texas	Lethal injection	
20	March 25, 2003	John Michael Hooker	49	34	15	Male	Black	Oklahoma	Lethal injection	
21	March 25, 2003	Larry Eugene Moon	55	37	18	Male	White	Georgia	Lethal injection	
22	March 26, 2003	James Blake Colburn	43	34	9	Male	White	Texas	Lethal injection	
23	April 3, 2003	Scott Allen Hain	32	17	15	Male	White	Oklahoma	Lethal injection	
24	April 8, 2003	Don Wilson Hawkins Jr.	43	25	18	Male	White	Oklahoma	Lethal injection	
25	April 9, 2003	Earl Conrad Bramblett	61	52	9	Male	White	Virginia	Electrocution	
26	April 17, 2003	Larry Kenneth Jackson	40	31	9	Male	Black	Oklahoma	Lethal injection	
27	April 22, 2003	Juan Rodriguez Chavez	34	27	7	Male	Hispanic	Texas	Lethal injection	
28	April 24, 2003	Gary Leon Brown	44	27	17	Male	White	Alabama	Lethal injection	
29	April 29, 2003	David M. Brewer	44	25	19	Male	White	Ohio	Lethal injection	
30	May 2, 2003	Kevin Lee Hough	43	26	17	Male	White	Indiana	Lethal injection	
31	May 6, 2003	Roger Dale Vaughn	48	37	11	Male	White	Texas	Lethal injection	
32	May 6, 2003	Carl Junior Isaacs	49	19	30	Male	White	Georgia	Lethal injection	
33	May 15, 2003	Bruce Charles Jacobs	56	39	17	Male	White	Texas	Lethal injection	
34	May 16, 2003	Newton Carlton Slawson	48	34	14	Male	White	Florida	Lethal injection	
35	May 27, 2003	Robert Wesley Knighton	62	48	14	Male	White	Oklahoma	Lethal injection	
36	June 5, 2003	Kenneth Chad Charm	37	27	10	Male	Black	Oklahoma	Lethal injection	
37	June 11, 2003	Kia Levoy Johnson	38	28	10	Male	Black	Texas	Lethal injection	
38	June 13, 2003	Joseph L. Trueblood	46	31	15	Male	White	Indiana	Lethal injection	
39	June 18, 2003	Ernest Martin	42	22	20	Male	Black	Ohio	Lethal injection	
40	July 1, 2003	Lewis Eugene Gilbert II	31	22	9	Male	White	Oklahoma	Lethal injection	
41	July 1, 2003	Hilton Lewis Crawford	64	56	8	Male	White	Texas	Lethal injection	
42	July 8, 2003	Robert Don Duckett	39	24	15	Male	White	Oklahoma	Lethal injection	
43	July 9, 2003	Christopher Black Sr.	43	38	5	Male	Black	Texas	Lethal injection	
44	July 9, 2003	Riley Dobi Noel	31	23	8	Male	Black	Arkansas	Lethal injection	
45	July 22, 2003	Bryan Anthony Toles	31	21	10	Male	Black	Oklahoma	Lethal injection	
46	July 22, 2003	Bobby Wayne Swisher	27	20	7	Male	White	Virginia	Lethal injection	
47	July 23, 2003	Cedric Lamont Ransom	29	18	11	Male	Black	Texas	Lethal injection	
48	July 24, 2003	Jackie Lee Willingham	33	25	8	Male	White	Oklahoma	Lethal injection	
49	July 24, 2003	Allen Wayne Janecka	53	29	24	Male	White	Texas	Lethal injection	
50	July 29, 2003	Harold Loyd McElmurry III	33	29	4	Male	White	Oklahoma	Lethal injection	
51	August 7, 2003	Tommy Jerry Fortenberry	39	20	19	Male	White	Alabama	Lethal injection	
52	August 22, 2003	William Quentin Jones	34	18	16	Male	Black	North Carolina	Lethal injection	
53	September 3, 2003	Paul Jennings Hill	49	40	9	Male	White	Florida	Lethal injection	
54	September 10, 2003	Larry Allen Hayes	54	50	4	Male	White	Texas	Lethal injection	
55	September 12, 2003	Henry Lee Hunt	58	39	19	Male	Native American	North Carolina	Lethal injection	
56	September 26, 2003	Joseph Earl Bates	35	22	13	Male	White	North Carolina	Lethal injection	
57	October 3, 2003	Edward Ernest Hartman	39	28	11	Male	White	North Carolina	Lethal injection	
58	October 29, 2003	John Clayton Smith	41	35	6	Male	White	Missouri	Lethal injection	
59	November 4, 2003	James Willie Brown	55	26	29	Male	White	Georgia	Lethal injection	
60	November 7, 2003	Joseph Timothy Keel	39	26	13	Male	White	North Carolina	Lethal injection	
61	November 14, 2003	John Dennis Daniels	46	32	14	Male	Black	North Carolina	Lethal injection	
62	November 20, 2003	Robert Lloyd Henry	41	30	11	Male	White	Texas	Lethal injection	
63	December 3, 2003	Richard Charles Duncan	61	45	16	Male	White	Texas	Lethal injection	
64	December 4, 2003	Ivan Ray Murphy Jr.	38	23	15	Male	White	Texas	Lethal injection	
65	December 5, 2003	Robbie James Lyons	31	21	10	Male	Black	North Carolina	Lethal injection	
		Average:	42 years	29 years	13 years					

== Demographics ==
Gender
Male	65	100%
Female	0	0%
Ethnicity
White	41	63%
Black	20	31%
Hispanic	3	5%
Native American	1	1%
State
Texas	24	37%
Oklahoma	14	21%
North Carolina	7	11%
Alabama	3	5%
Florida	3	5%
Georgia	3	5%
Ohio	3	5%
Indiana	2	3%
Missouri	2	3%
Virginia	2	3%
Arkansas	1	1%
Federal Government	1	1%
Method
Lethal injection	64	99%
Electrocution	1	1%
Month
January	7	11%
February	7	11%
March	8	12%
April	7	11%
May	6	9%
June	4	6%
July	11	17%
August	2	3%
September	4	6%
October	2	3%
November	4	6%
December	3	5%
Age
20–29	3	5%
30–39	27	41%
40–49	24	37%
50–59	7	11%
60–69	4	6%
Total	65	100%

== Executions in recent years ==
Number of executions
2004	59
2003	65
2002	71
Total	195

== See also ==
- List of death row inmates in the United States
- List of most recent executions by jurisdiction
- List of people scheduled to be executed in the United States
- List of women executed in the United States since 1976

Preceded by 2002	List of people executed in the United States in 2003	Succeeded by 2004
