= Ernest Martin (murderer) =

American murderer

- Mug shot of Ernest Martin
- Born: September 22, 1960
- Died: June 18, 2003 (aged 42); Southern Ohio Correctional Facility, Ohio, U.S.
- Status: Executed by lethal injection
- Motive: robbery
- Convictions: Aggravated murder Aggravated robbery
- Penalty: Death

Ernest Martin (September 22, 1960 – June 18, 2003) was executed by the State of Ohio for the murder of a Cleveland store owner. He was convicted of the crime on July 8, 1983, and spent 19 years, 11 months, and 10 days on death row while his case was appealed.

== The crime ==
On December 20, 1982, Ernel Foster, a security guard, was robbed of his .38 caliber Smith & Wesson revolver by a black male, while waiting at a bus stop in Cleveland, Ohio. Foster later testified that he chased the offender for a block and a half and was able to see his face. He further noted that the offender's hair was in small braids. On February 1, 1983, Foster was summoned to the police station to view a line-up composed of six black males. Foster was able to identify Martin, noting that his hair was braided in the same manner as it appeared on December 20, 1982. Later, Foster identified Martin in the courtroom as the man who had taken his weapon.

Martin's girlfriend, Josephine Pedro, testified that he had threatened her with a gun earlier that year, telling her that he had stolen the weapon from a security guard. She wrote down the serial number of the gun on the back of an envelope box. The number was identical to the serial number of Foster's weapon except that the letter "D" had been purposely transformed into a "9." Pedro testified that this was done to make the number sequence look like a telephone number in order to ward off any suspicion.

Pedro further testified that in the early hours of January 21, 1983, Martin revealed a plan to rob Robinson's Drug Store. She attempted to dissuade him but Martin threatened her if she did not cooperate in the robbery. Martin then left the apartment and returned approximately ten minutes later with the gun he had taken from Foster.

Martin devised a plan whereby Pedro was to go to the store and attempt to buy medicine for a cold. When 71-year-old Robert Robinson, owner of the store, unlocked the door to allow Pedro's entrance, Martin planned to follow her in and rob the premises. Martin wore gray pants, tennis shoes and a waist length black leather jacket. He covered his face with a brown knit cap in which he cut holes for his eyes to avoid being identified. At approximately 12:45 a.m., Pedro arrived at the store and knocked on the door. Upon recognizing Pedro, Robinson unlocked the door to let her in. However, he locked the door again before Martin could gain entry. As Robinson stood in front of the door after locking it, Martin fired two shots through the door fatally wounding him. After firing the shots Martin allegedly went to the apartment to change his clothes and then returned to the store to finish the robbery.

Monty Parkey, an employee of Robinson, was in the back room at the time of the shooting. After hearing the shots and seeing what had occurred, Parkey called an ambulance and the police. He then instructed Pedro to go to Robinson's house to get Mrs. Robinson. Pedro complied and upon returning was interviewed by the police concerning the events. She gave them her name and address and stated she knew nothing about the shooting. Martin was also present at this time and talked to the police. Upon completing her interview, Pedro returned to her apartment.

When Pedro reached the apartment she called her neighbor, Larry Kidd. Martin returned approximately thirty-five minutes later. Pedro asked Martin whether the evening's events had been worth it. He showed her a pile of bills under a blanket which he then took into the bathroom and explained that the robbery netted $39.

Martin then drove Kidd and Pedro to an "after hours" spot for drinks. After they sat down at the table, Martin took two spent cartridges from his pocket and placed them on the table. Kidd remarked: "Mr. Robinson got shot twice, and you got two cartridges." Martin did not respond to this comment.

== The investigation ==
Several days after the shooting the police again questioned Pedro and Martin. By this time the two had put together a story for the police that Pedro had gone to the store to get cough medicine when the deceased was shot and that Martin only came to the store after she had been gone for an unusually long time. On January 29, 1983, the police returned and arrested Pedro and Martin for the murder of Robinson. After several days in jail, Pedro told the police that she had helped set up the robbery by going to the store and that Martin had shot the deceased.

Soon afterwards, Martin's father contacted Pedro asking her to change her statement. While visiting Martin in jail, Martin's father again asked Pedro to change her story.

== Trial ==
During the trial, the state introduced a letter dated February 13, 1983, wherein Martin asked Pedro to "tell the truth" and implicate a man named "Slim" for the murder-robbery of Robinson. An additional letter dated February 17, 1983, in which Martin again asked her to implicate "Slim", was also introduced into evidence. Pedro has continually denied that "Slim" had anything to do with these crimes.

The state also offered another letter into evidence which had been written by Martin to Pedro when he was in jail in February 1981 for another offense. Pedro identified the letter and read it into the record. The letter asked Pedro to lie for Martin and to implicate someone else for the commission of the offense for which Martin was charged. Pedro admitted lying for Martin pursuant to the letter in the previous trial for the other offense.

Finally, Antoinette Henderson testified that she lived with Pedro for about five or six months until the middle of December 1982. During December she heard Martin say he was going to rob Robinson's store. Martin threatened her with a gun, warning her that she had better not tell anyone of his plan.

During the trial the defense presented no witnesses, but sought to introduce into evidence written statements of Pedro and Henderson. The court denied this request finding the written statements were not inconsistent as alleged by the defense.

The jury found Martin guilty of the aggravated robbery of Ernel Foster and of the aggravated robbery and aggravated murder of Robert Robinson with the specification of being the principal offender of the aggravated murder while committing or attempting to commit aggravated robbery. After the mitigation hearing was conducted, the jury recommended that he receive the death penalty.

== Appeals ==
Although Martin's appeals centered on his arrest and his claim of ineffective assistance of counsel, he also attempted to introduce evidence of his innocence.

E.J. Rieves-Bey lived across the street from the victim's store and witnessed someone running away from the scene after hearing shots fired. Within two weeks of the killing, he gave a statement to the Cleveland police describing the man he saw fleeing as 5'10" and 170 lbs, roughly matching Martin. Approximately a month later, he told a court-appointed investigator that the man was "About six foot, two maybe three . . . Maybe about 180, 200 pounds." He also stated, "I know he's taller than Ernest Martin, and Ernest Martin is smaller, way smaller."

The State subpoenaed Rieves-Bey to testify, but he arrived just as jury deliberations began. The State sought to reopen its case and present the testimony of Rieves-Bey. The defense successfully objected, and deliberations continued.

At the hearing on Martin's motion for a new trial, Rieves-Bey described the man he saw fleeing from the scene as "about six foot, 200 pounds." He also stated that the man was wearing "a black coat, and a brown mask and sort of a hat." He testified that several minutes after he saw the fleeing man, he saw Martin walking toward the crime scene, and that he was wearing "(a) brown long coat, lighter, a brown coat." This description corroborated Pedro's testimony that Martin wore a black leather jacket and brown mask with holes cut for eyes, prior to and during the crime, and that when he returned to the store after the shooting, he wore a "long grey coat."

Rieves-Bey gave a 1997 deposition for purposes of Martin's habeas corpus action. He was incarcerated at the time. He insisted that Martin "wasn't the man" that he saw fleeing the scene. During the deposition, he admitted that his cocaine addiction had impaired his memory, and that he couldn't remember giving testimony in 1983 about the case.

Martin's allegations of ineffective assistance of counsel were rejected by the appellate courts, and the federal courts also found that "although petitioner's arrest could have been illegal, his identification by the security guard and his girlfriend's statements to police were not suppressible fruits of the tainted action. The overwhelming nature of the evidence of guilt precluded petitioner from showing that prejudice resulted from any alleged deficiency in his counsel's cross-examination."

== Execution ==
At the time of his execution, Martin maintained his innocence and compared himself to Jesus Christ, saying he too had been "lied on and slandered."

"I don't hold any grudges or hatred because God is in control of all things", he said. "I thank God for this life even though it wasn't always a good one. You all know that I love you", he continued. "Hug mama and let everybody know that I love them and that we'll see each other again. You take care, media. God bless all of you. That's all I have to say."

== See also ==
- Capital punishment in Ohio
- Capital punishment in the United States
- List of people executed by lethal injection
- List of people executed in Ohio
- List of people executed in the United States in 2003

== Sources ==
=== Court cases ===
- State v. Martin, No. 84-1660, Supreme Court of Ohio, 19 Ohio St. 3d 122; 483 N.E.2d 1157; 1985 Ohio LEXIS 520;
- State v. Martin, NO. 69554, Court Of Appeals Of Ohio, Eighth Appellate District, Cuyahoga County, 1996 Ohio App. LEXIS 2422, June 13, 1996,
- State v. Martin, NO. 66938, Court Of Appeals Of Ohio, Eighth Appellate District, Cuyahoga County, 1995 Ohio App. LEXIS 571, February 16, 1995
- Martin v. Mitchell, 00-3357/00-3359, United States Court Of Appeals For The Sixth Circuit, 2002 U.S. App. LEXIS 6484, March 28, 2002,
- Martin v. Mitchell, Nos. 00-3357/00-3359, United States Court Of Appeals For The Sixth Circuit, 280 F.3d 594; 2002 U.S. App. LEXIS 1827; 2002 FED App. 0050P (6th Cir.), August 7, 2001

=== Media accounts ===
- "Executed man's last words accuse state of using false testimony", The Associated Press State & Local Wire, June 19, 2003
- "Inmate executed for 1983 murder; He uses his last words to proclaim innocence", The Plain Dealer, June 19, 2003

=== Other sources ===
- Clark Prosecutor
- 2005 Capital Crimes Report (pdf) Office of the Ohio Attorney General.

Executions carried out in Ohio
| Preceded by David M. Brewer April 29, 2003 | Ernest Martin; June 18, 2003 | Succeeded by Lewis Williams Jr. January 14, 2004 |
Executions carried out in the United States
| Preceded by Joseph Trueblood – Indiana June 13, 2003 | Ernest Martin – Ohio; June 18, 2003 | Succeeded by Lewis Gilbert II – Oklahoma July 1, 2003 |
