= Earl Bramblett =

American mass murderer

- Born: Earl Conrad Bramblett; March 20, 1942; Sweetwater, Texas, U.S.
- Died: April 9, 2003 (aged 61); Greensville Correctional Center, Virginia, U.S.
- Children: 2
- Status: Executed by electrocution
- Convictions: Capital murder First degree murder (3 counts); Arson; Use of a firearm in the commission of a felony (3 counts)
- Penalty: Death (December 16, 1997)

Details
- Date: August 28, 1994
- Location: Vinton, Virginia
- Target: Hodges family
- Killed: 4
- Weapon: .22 Magnum Arminius revolver

Earl Conrad Bramblett (March 20, 1942 – April 9, 2003) was an American mass murderer, convicted for the killing of four members of the Hodges family in August 1994 in Vinton, Virginia. Bramblett murdered each family member in their residence before setting it on fire, and in 1997 was sentenced to death for the murders.

Bramblett was executed by electric chair on April 9, 2003.

== Murders ==
At around 4:30 a.m. on August 29, 1994, a passerby reported a fire at the Hodges residence in Vinton, Virginia. Firefighters and police found fire burning throughout the house. Gaining entry, authorities found 37-year-old Teresa Lynn Hodges' body on a couch, still burning—she had been strangled and doused with diesel fuel. On the second floor, they discovered William Blaine Hodges (aged 41) dead on a bed next to a .22 caliber revolver with the barrel removed, shot through his left temple, but not burned. In a second bed they found daughters Winter (aged 11) and Anah (aged 3); both had been shot at close range, and Anah had sustained mild burns.

Further inspection of the Hodges house revealed purposefully-disconnected telephone lines and the presence of a petroleum-based accelerant in several areas.

Having found Blaine Hodges' body next to a gun, police at first theorized that Blaine had killed his family and then himself; Blaine, a former U.S. Postal Service employee, was about to serve six months in federal prison for embezzlement. Blaine was also ordered to make a large restitution payment, even though he apparently did not have the funds. Further investigation determined that the barrel of the murder weapon had been removed after Blaine had been killed, and that Blaine had been killed before the rest of his family.

=== Investigation ===
Earl Bramblett, from Spartanburg, South Carolina, was a close friend of the Hodges family. Police requested an interview with Bramblett, during which they told him the family had died in a fire, without mentioning the evidence of violence. Bramblett punched a file cabinet in anger, said "The sorry son of a bitch! Had a beautiful family. He did them and he did himself", and, later in the interview, suddenly asked "Are you going to charge me with murder?", which indicated prior knowledge and immediately made him a prime suspect.

Soon police gathered additional incriminating evidence against Bramblett. A witness had seen a vehicle similar to Bramblett's driving past the Hodges home during the fire, without stopping. Drawings of stick figures with arrows that corresponded to the Hodges' bullet wounds were found at Bramblett's place of employment. Bramblett had claimed to his boss that he had slept in his truck, but his clothes were clean and his hair was not unkempt at all. Bramblett had punched his timecard at work eight minutes late and, after realizing his error, attempted to black out the entry on his timecard.

Bramblett's sister provided police with a box he had left with her, which contained several audiotapes in which he spoke of his sexual attraction to 11-year-old Winter Hodges, and of his belief that the family, including Winter, was conspiring to set him up for child molestation charges in the hopes of earning enough money from the case to pay the restitution owed by Blaine (whom he referred to as "backstabbing" and "cheap").

A DNA test on a pubic hair found in the bedroom where the girls were found was matched to Bramblett. A pair of Lane Bryant jeans were found soaking at his place of employment, discovered by another employee after noticing water leaking through the door, and were determined to contain stains of the same flammable liquid used to start the fire at the Hodges's home. The bullets used to kill the victims were determined to be of the same composition as bullets found in a vehicle belonging to Bramblett.

In addition, two women testified that, in the 1970s, Bramblett had given them alcohol and raped them when they were eleven and fourteen years old.

== Arrest and conviction ==
Bramblett was tried, convicted, and sentenced to death on December 16, 1997, after the jury deliberated for one hour.

=== Execution ===
After a clemency petition to Governor of Virginia Mark Warner was rejected, along with an appeal to the U.S. Supreme Court, Earl Bramblett was executed in the electric chair for the murder of the Hodges family at Greensville Correctional Center, Jarratt, Virginia, on April 9, 2003. He was sixty-one years old at the time of his death, choosing the electric chair over lethal injection as a form of protest. His final words were, "I didn't murder the Hodges family. I've never murdered anybody. I'm going to my death with a clear conscience. I am going to my death having had a great life because of my two great sons, Mike and Doug."

== Disappearances of Tammy Akers and Angela Rader ==
Bramblett was a suspect in the 1977 disappearances of Tammy Akers and Angela Rader, who were both 14 years old and worked for him at the time. Bramblett reportedly told friends that he wished he had not "hurt Tammy" three years after she went missing, though he was never charged in either Akers's or Rader's disappearances and their whereabouts are still unknown.

== Media ==
Bramblett's case was featured on the popular CourtTV crime show Forensic Files – Season 8, Episode 5 "Private Thoughts" and Discovery Channel's The New Detectives – Season 4, Episode 4: "Dead Wrong".

== See also ==
- Capital punishment in Virginia
- Capital punishment in the United States
- List of people executed in Virginia
- List of people executed in the United States in 2003
