= David M. Brewer =

American murderer (1959–2003)

- Mug shot of David M. Brewer
- Born: April 22, 1959; Middletown, Ohio, U.S.
- Died: April 29, 2003 (aged 44); Southern Ohio Correctional Facility, Lucasville, Ohio, U.S.
- Cause of death: Execution by lethal injection
- Spouse: Kathy Brewer
- Status: Executed
- Conviction: Aggravated murder
- Penalty: Death

David M. Brewer (April 22, 1959 – April 29, 2003) was the seventh person executed by the state of Ohio since it reinstated the death penalty in 1981. Brewer died by lethal injection on April 29, 2003, after spending 17 years and six months on death row. He was convicted of the 1985 murder of 21-year-old Sherry Byrne, the wife of a college fraternity brother.

After his indictment by a grand jury, Brewer waived his right to a jury and elected to be tried by a three-judge panel. He was found guilty on September 19, 1985, and sentenced to death in October 1985. His subsequent appeals at the state and federal levels were unsuccessful, as was his request for executive clemency.

At 10:00 a.m. on April 29, 2003, Brewer was led into the execution chamber at the state prison in Lucasville, Ohio. He was declared dead at 10:20 a.m. Brewer's last words were, "Just that I'd like to say to the system in Ohio, as far as the Death Row inmates are concerned, there are some that are innocent. I'm not one of them, but there are plenty that are innocent. I hope the state recognizes that. That's all I have to say."

== See also ==
- Capital punishment in Ohio
- Capital punishment in the United States
- List of people executed in Ohio
- List of people executed in the United States in 2003

== General references ==
- Clark Prosecutor
- "Ohio's Seventh Execution Since 1999; Killer Offers No Final Apology" Columbus Dispatch (Ohio). April 30, 2003
- State v. Brewer, 1996 Ohio App. LEXIS 2517
- State v. Brewer, 1988 Ohio App. LEXIS 3492
- 2005 Capital Crimes Report (PDF) Office of the Ohio Attorney General.

Executions carried out in Ohio
Preceded by Richard Edwin Fox February 12, 2003	David M. Brewer; April 29, 2003	Succeeded by Ernest Martin June 18, 2003
Executions carried out in the United States
Preceded by Gary Brown – Alabama April 24, 2003	David M. Brewer – Ohio; April 29, 2003	Succeeded by Kevin Hough – Indiana May 2, 2003
