= William P. Hobby Unit =

Women's prison in Falls County, Texas, United States

Coordinates: 31.255°N 96.909°W

The William P. Hobby Unit (HB) is a prison for women in unincorporated Falls County, Texas, United States. Named after William P. Hobby, Lieutenant Governor of Texas, it is a part of the Texas Department of Criminal Justice (TDCJ). It is located on Texas Farm to Market Road 712, off Texas Business Highway 6 and 6 miles (9.7 km) southwest of Marlin.

The unit has a capacity of 1,342.

== History ==
The prison was established in November 1989.

In 2005 prisoner Helen Ann Caples filed a federal lawsuit, accusing the prison of using contaminated water from the City of Marlin. The federal authorities rejected the lawsuit.

As of 2008 the prison had 1,293 inmates.

In September 2014 a sewage backup occurred at the unit, affecting drinking water and toilet services.

As of October 2014 the same warden oversees both the Hobby and Marlin Units. That month Vikki Wright, the warden of Hobby, stated that the unit was not fully staffed but that it was still functional.

== Notable prisoners (current) ==
Inmate Name	Register Number	Status	Details
Kristi Anne Koslow	04702187 / 00677795	Serving a life sentence. Eligible for parole in 2027.	Conspirator in the 1992 murder of Caren Koslow, her stepmother, in which she ordered two individuals to kill her parents, though they were only successful in ending the life of Caren.
Erin Michelle Caffey	04889597 / 01548417	Serving a life sentence. Eligible for parole in 2038.	Planned the murder of the Caffey family along with 3 other perpetrators. Only the father, Terry Caffey, survived.

== Former Inmates ==
Former:

- Susan Wright
