= Juan Rodriguez Chavez =

Executed American serial killer

- Chavez's TDCJ mugshot
- Born: April 27, 1968; Fort Wayne, Indiana, U.S.
- Died: April 22, 2003 (aged 34); Huntsville Unit, Texas, U.S.
- Other name: "The Thrill Killer"
- Status: Executed by lethal injection
- Convictions: Capital murder Murder
- Penalty: 15 years imprisonment (1985); Death (1996)

Details
- Victims: 12
- Span of crimes: March 22, 1985 – July 23, 1995
- Country: United States
- State: Texas
- Date apprehended: For the final time in August 1995

Juan Rodriguez Chavez (April 27, 1968 – April 22, 2003), known as The Thrill Killer, was an American serial killer who, together with a teenage accomplice, killed eleven people in Dallas, Texas during a crime spree lasting from March to July 1995, shortly after being paroled from prison for a murder conviction. For the latter crimes, Chavez was sentenced to death and subsequently executed in 2003.

== Early life, first murder, and incarceration ==
Juan Rodriguez Chavez was born on April 27, 1968, in Fort Wayne, Indiana, as the middle child of nineteen children born to a couple of itinerant farm workers. About three months after his birth, the entire Chavez family moved to West Dallas, a neighborhood populated predominantly by other Mexican Americans. All members of the family, including Juan, were described as normal, decent people, although the latter dropped out of school after the ninth grade.

On December 28, 1985, the 17-year-old Chavez and two accomplices broke into the home of Raul and Vincente Mendoza with the intent of robbing them. During the robbery, the trio opened fire on the pair, partially blinding Raul and killing Vincente in the process. All three of them were arrested, tried, and convicted for murder and aggravated robbery, with Chavez receiving a 15-year sentence for his participation. Only a few years into his incarceration, he joined the Texas Syndicate, a violent prison gang, and until the end of his sentence, he committed upwards of 40 violations – this ranged from refusing to work assigned jobs to nearly murdering fellow inmates.

In spite of his actions, Chavez was paroled in April 1994, whereupon he moved in to live with his sister Isabel in Dallas. According to her and his parole officer, he appeared to have changed for the better, although he struggled to find a job due to his convictions. Around this time, he became acquainted with 15-year-old Hector "Crazy" Fernandez, a mentally-ill teenager who became fascinated with his older friend due to his knowledge of firearms and his willingness to defend him from a teenage street gang that had harassed him. Fernandez would later testify that they spent a majority of their time messing around and shooting a variety of firearms.

== Release and crime spree ==
On March 22, 1995, Chavez, Fernandez, and Chavez's girlfriend, Rachel Blanco, went around cruising for new rims in Rachel's father's Lincoln Continental. While driving around East Davis, Chavez noticed a car in a car wash which had rims he really liked, whereupon he pulled over. He then got out of the car and threatened Jose Castillo, the car's owner, for his keys. Before Castillo could respond, Chavez shot him and took the keys, but did not take the car. Two months later, on May 20, Chavez and Fernandez carjacked and shot Juan Pablo Hernandez at a parking lot in West Davis, stealing his Buick Regal after the fact. The car was then taken to a chop shop and disassembled – Fernandez kept the vehicle's stereo system, but Chavez decided not to take anything from it.

On July 1, Chavez and Fernandez stole a Chevrolet Caprice from a Greyhound bus maintenance center and headed to Northwest Dallas. After stopping at a local Mexican American nightclub, where they met up with two acquaintances, Joe Gonzalez and Edgar Retiz, whom they convinced to accompany them. Chavez and Fernandez then got in the Caprice and sped towards Webbs Chapel Extension, followed by Gonzalez and Retiz in the latter's pickup truck. While cruising around the apartment complexes, Chavez noticed 40-year-old Jose Vasquez Morales, who was using a public telephone booth. He pulled up next to the man and asked whether he was still on the line, and when Morales exited the booth to respond, Chavez got out of the car, drew a revolver, and shot him in the chest. He then rifled through his pockets, stealing a wallet with $2 and some credit cards, then shot his victim again in the back before hopping back into the car and speeding away. He pulled over further down the road to talk to the shocked Gonzalez and Retiz, who had seen the shooting from afar, and warned them not to tell anyone or they would suffer the same fate. After this, Gonzalez and Retiz left, while Chavez and Fernandez moved on.

Over the next four hours, the pair committed several additional shootings, resulting in the deaths of multiple victims. The first to die was Susan Ferguson, a female security guard who was shot and robbed in an empty parking lot near the Stemmons Freeway – after shooting her, Chavez got back into his car and ran over her body. About forty minutes later, the pair shot Kevin Hancock, a male security guard who was standing guard at the Indian Ridge apartment complex, from whom they stole a 9mm handgun. Hancock survived, but was left permanently paralyzed.

Ten minutes later, Chavez and Fernandez went to East Ninth Street, where they robbed and then shot three men (Jesus Briseno, Francisco Jaimes, and Alberto Guevara) at gunpoint. Briseno was killed, while Jaimes and Guevara were wounded, but later recovered from their injuries. One of the men reportedly tossed a wad of cash onto the hood of the car in an attempt to convince their attackers to spare them, but this was apparently ignored. About an hour later, the pair went to Kidd Springs, where Chavez broke into the pickup truck of Alfonso Contreras, who was making out with his girlfriend, Maria Guadalupe Delgadillo-Pena. Contreras was shot after he refused to surrender his wallet, whereupon Chavez got into the truck and drove to an isolated road near Trinity River, dumping his victim's body along the way. After arriving at his intended destination, he forced the shocked Delgadillo-Pena to exit the vehicle and ran her over, but she survived. Chavez then ordered Fernandez to finish her off with his handgun, which he did.

The pair then drove the truck to Chavez's house, where they picked up some gasoline, and then went to an exit of the I-35, where they torched it. Two days after the shootings, Chavez got into an altercation at a parking lot of a tire shop on West Davis with two men, Antonio Rios and Manuel Duran. He threatened to shoot both of them if they did not move their car, and when one of them told him to go ahead and do it, Chavez got his gun out and killed both. As he attempted to drive away, he aimed his handgun from the driver's window and opened fire on Antonio Banda, who was standing in the front yard of his mother's house – Banda was struck by the gunfire, and subsequently perished from his injuries. The final attack occurred on July 23, when Juan Carlos Macias was shot and killed during a carjacking.

== Investigation and arrest ==
The sudden and seemingly random spate of killings greatly horrified the community, and local police were pressured into solving the cases as fast as they could. The investigation faced difficulties from the beginning as, at the time, most of the incidents were thought to be unrelated to one another. As a result, four men in total were detained on suspicion of committing the crimes, but all of them would later be released – two of them, 21-year-old Michael Anthony Martinez and Luis M. Canales, would spend three months behind bars prior to being released.

Fernandez was eventually questioned as the fifth suspect in the case, and after initially refusing to talk, he confessed to detectives that he and his friend were responsible for the murders. In exchange for being granted witness immunity, Fernandez explained in detail how most of the killings were conducted, stressing that while some of the victims were indeed robbed, Chavez usually discarded the stolen items and seemed to carry out the killings for pure enjoyment. He also claimed that Chavez frequently berated poorer Mexican immigrants and called them wetbacks.

After Chavez was arrested and his house was searched, authorities found multiple loaded weapons, including a .38 revolver which was later identified as the weapon used in at least six of the shootings. Because of this, he was charged with several counts of murder and held on $600,000 bond to await trial. During this time, Fernandez was placed in protective custody, as there were fears that Chavez's acquaintances might harm him. At the time, Chavez's killing spree was described as the most prolific in Dallas' history.

== Trial, imprisonment, and execution ==
Before his murder trial would start, charges in five of the murders were dropped in favor of prosecuting Chavez for the one they had the most solid evidence – the murder of Jose Morales. On the first day of testimony, Chavez was accidentally hit by an electroshock from the belt of a bailiff, resulting in the temporary halt of proceedings.

When the proceedings resumed, prosecutors presented evidence from the other slayings and mortuary photographs to illustrate the brutality of Chavez and Fernandez's crimes. In response, his attorney argued that Fernandez and another man previously considered a suspect, Jaime Gonzalez, were the actual perpetrators and were attempting to frame his client. Throughout the proceedings, Chavez seemed jovial, only occasionally smirking to the victims' family members in an attempt to antagonize them.

Due to the overwhelming amount of evidence against him, the jury found him guilty on all counts and sentenced him to death after less than two hours of deliberations. During the sentencing phase, a smiling Chavez was allowed to take the stand and professed his innocence before the court, claiming that he was not guilty.

Over the next years, Chavez repeatedly attempted to appeal his death sentence, but the relevant courts rejected each of his appeals. After his appeals were exhausted, his execution date was scheduled for April 22, 2003. On the aforementioned date, he was executed via lethal injection at the Huntsville Unit. While preparations were being set up for the procedure, Chavez smiled and grinned to his family members, who had come to witness his execution. Before his execution, Chavez made a final statement seemingly expressing remorse for his actions: "To the media, I would like for you to tell all the victims and their loved ones that I am truly, truly sorry for taking their loved ones' lives. And I hope they will find it in their heart to forgive me for what I did to them. I am a different person now, but that does not change the fact of the bad things I have committed. God can give you the same peace He gave me, and you can be in His hands. And to my beautiful family, be strong. Remember what I said, "God is the Way, the Truth, and the Life." OK, Warden." His final audible words were to ask whether the drugs were taking effect, and he reportedly spent the last minutes of his life praying.

== See also ==
- List of people executed by lethal injection
- List of people executed in Texas, 2000–2009
- List of people executed in the United States in 2003
- List of serial killers in the United States
