= Murder of Adriana Marines =

American murder victim

Adriana Marines
- Born: Adriana Nicole Marines; October 30, 1991; Corpus Christi, Texas, U.S.
- Died: September 27, 1997 (aged 5); Corpus Christi, Texas, U.S.

Adriana Nicole Marines (October 30, 1991 – September 27, 1997) was a 5-year-old American girl of Mexican descent, who was murdered in her Corpus Christi, Texas home. Her murder sparked widespread local and nationwide media attention.

== Murder ==
On the afternoon of September 27, 1997, Marines' uncle, Narciso ‘Ted’ Cuellar, allegedly went to his girlfriend's house and turned violent, striking the woman various times. Upon learning about the beating that Cuellar supposedly administered to his mother, John Richard Baltazar, also known plainly as John Baltazar, armed himself with a gun and sought out his friend, Johnny Gonzalez. According to police records, the pair of friends went to the Marineses' home to shoot Narciso Cuellar to avenge the abuse he had allegedly administered to Baltazar's mother.

Narciso Cuellar was known to often stay at his sister's house and usually lay down or slept on a bed on the porch, but that night he was not in the house. Adriana Marines and her 10-year-old cousin Vanessa were using the bed to watch a video of Sleeping Beauty instead. According to his own admission, Baltazar arrived and began shooting in the dark, as the house's lights had apparently been turned off. Some reports point out that Baltazar aggressively kicked down the Marines' home's front door before starting to shoot. He struck Adriana Marines twice in her head and her cousin Vanessa once in her chest. Vanessa Marines was able to survive, but never fully recovered from her chest wound as the bullet had to be left there by doctors, and it seemed to be moving towards her vertebrae, with the medics that have attended her since hoping that it can be removed later on. Adriana Marines, meanwhile, died instantly. Her father, Arturo, was also shot twice but survived along with Marines' mother, Matilda.

== Aftermath ==
John Richard Baltazar and Johnny Gonzalez were arrested and both convicted of capital murder. Baltazar was sentenced to death by lethal injection in March 1998. Gonzalez was sentenced to life in prison with parole eligibility in 40 years. He will become eligible for parole in 2037. As of 2022, he remains incarcerated at the John B. Connally Unit.

In September 1999, the Texas Court of Criminal Appeals upheld Baltazar's status as a death row member, and several other appeals were also denied.

Baltazar expressed regrets for Adriana Marines' death, saying that "(He was) sorry for Adriana", and adding that "There's no words for (him) to say how sorry (he was) for the little girl". He did not, however, express any regrets in trying to kill Adriana Marines' uncle, Cuellar, stating that "(he's) never been very good with controlling (his) anger, but if Ted were to beat (his) mom again, (he) would try and [sic] go whip on him again." Baltazar did not show remorse for shooting Adriana's father Arturo either, pronouncing that "He jumped up and he was in (John Richard's) face. That's why he got shot."

On January 15, 2003, and under the blitz of much media coverage, Baltazar was executed by lethal injection at the Huntsville Unit. He did not make any final statements. He is buried at Captain Joe Byrd Cemetery.

== See also ==
- Capital punishment in Texas
- Capital punishment in the United States
- List of people executed in Texas, 2000–2009
- List of people executed in the United States in 2003
