= List of people executed in Texas, 2000–2009 =

The following is a list of people executed by the U.S. state of Texas between 2000 and 2009. All of the 248 people (246 males and 2 females) during this period were convicted of murder and have been executed by lethal injection at the Huntsville Unit in Huntsville, Texas. The count is the most of any decade in Texas history, surpassing the 166 executions from the previous decade (1990–1999).

== Executions 2000–2009 ==
The number in the "#" column indicates the nth person executed since 1982 (when Texas resumed the death penalty). As an example, Earl Carl Heiselbetz Jr. (the first person executed in Texas during the 2000 decade) was the 200th person executed since resumption of the death penalty.

2000 – 40 executions
#	Executed person	Ethnicity	Age	Sex	Date of execution	County	Victim(s)	Governor
200	Earl Carl Heiselbetz Jr.	White	48	M	12-Jan-2000	Sabine	Rena Whitton Rogers and Jacy Rogers	George W. Bush
201	Spencer Corey Goodman	White	31	M	18-Jan-2000	Fort Bend	Cecile Ham	George W. Bush
202	David Hicks	Black	38	M	20-Jan-2000	Freestone	Ocolor Hegger	George W. Bush
203	Larry Keith Robison	White	42	M	21-Jan-2000	Tarrant	5 murder victims (Note: The 5 victims were: Rickey Lee Bryant, Georgia Ann Reed, Scott Reed, Earline H. Barker, and Bruce M. Gardner.)	George W. Bush
204	Billy George Hughes Jr.	White	47	M	24-Jan-2000	Matagorda	TDPS state trooper Mark Alan Frederick	George W. Bush
205	Glen Charles McGinnis	Black	27	M	25-Jan-2000	Montgomery	Leta Ann Wilkerson	George W. Bush
206	James Walter Moreland	White	39	M	27-Jan-2000	Henderson	Clinton Corbet Abbott and John Royce Cravey	George W. Bush
207	Cornelius Alan Goss	Black	38	M	23-Feb-2000	Dallas	Carl Leevy	George W. Bush
208	Betty Lou Beets	White	62	F	24-Feb-2000	Henderson	Jimmy Don Beets	George W. Bush
209	Odell Barnes Jr.	Black	31	M	01-Mar-2000	Lubbock	Helen Bass	George W. Bush
210	Ponchai Kamau Wilkerson	Black	28	M	14-Mar-2000	Harris	Chung Myong Yi	George W. Bush
211	Timothy Lane Gribble	White	36	M	15-Mar-2000	Galveston	Elizabeth Jones (Note: Also killed Donna Weis, but was executed for killing Jones.)	George W. Bush
212	Tommy Ray Jackson	Black	43	M	04-May-2000	Williamson	Rosalind Robison	George W. Bush
213	William Joseph Kitchens	White	37	M	09-May-2000	Taylor	Patricia Leeann Webb	George W. Bush
214	Michael Lee McBride	White	38	M	11-May-2000	Lubbock	Christian Fisher and James Alan Holzler	George W. Bush
215	James Davis Richardson	Black	32	M	23-May-2000	Navarro	Gerald Abay	George W. Bush
216	Richard Donald Foster	White	47	M	24-May-2000	Parker	Gary Michael Cox	George W. Bush
217	James Edward Clayton	Black	33	M	25-May-2000	Taylor	Lori Michelle Barrett	George W. Bush
218	Robert Earl Carter	Black	34	M	31-May-2000	Bastrop (Note: On a change of venue from Burleson.)	6 murder victims (Note: The 6 victims were: Bobbie Davis, Nicole Davis, Denitra Davis, Lea Erin Davis, Brittany Davis, and Jason Davis.)	George W. Bush
219	Thomas Wayne Mason	White	48	M	12-Jun-2000	Smith	Marsha Yvonne Brock and Sybil Mares Denis	George W. Bush
220	John Albert Burks	Black	44	M	14-Jun-2000	McLennan	Jesse Contreras	George W. Bush
221	Paul Selso Nuncio	Hispanic	32	M	15-Jun-2000	Hale	Pauline Crownover Farris	George W. Bush
222	Gary Lee Graham	Black	36	M	22-Jun-2000	Harris	Bobby Grant Lambert	George W. Bush
223	Jessy Carlos San Miguel	Hispanic	28	M	29-Jun-2000	Dallas	4 murder victims (Note: The 4 victims were: Michael John Phelan, Theresa Fraga, Frank Fraga, and Song Trang Nyugen.)	George W. Bush
224	Orien Cecil Joiner	White	50	M	12-Jul-2000	Lubbock	Carol Lynette Huckabee and Eva Marie DeForest	George W. Bush
225	Juan Salvez Soria	Hispanic	33	M	26-Jul-2000	Tarrant	Allen E. Bolden	George W. Bush
226	Brian Keith Roberson	Black	36	M	09-Aug-2000	Dallas	James Louis Boots and Lillian Boots	George W. Bush
227	David Oliver Cruz	Hispanic	33	M	09-Aug-2000	Bexar	Kelly Elizabeth Donovan	George W. Bush
228	John Thomas Satterwhite	Black	53	M	16-Aug-2000	Bexar	Mary Francis Davis	George W. Bush
229	Richard Wayne Jones	White	40	M	22-Aug-2000	Tarrant	Tammy Livingston	George W. Bush
230	David Earl Gibbs	White	39	M	23-Aug-2000	Montgomery	Marietta Bryant and Carol Ackland	George W. Bush
231	Jeffery Henry Caldwell	Black	37	M	30-Aug-2000	Dallas	Gwendolyn Caldwell, Henry Porter Caldwell Jr., and Kimberly Caldwell	George W. Bush
232	Ricky Nolen McGinn	White	43	M	27-Sep-2000	Brown	Stephanie Flanary	George W. Bush
233	Jeffrey Dillingham	White	27	M	01-Nov-2000	Wichita	Caren Courtney Koslow	George W. Bush
234	Miguel Ángel Flores	Hispanic	31	M	09-Nov-2000	Collin (Note: On a change of venue from Hutchinson.)	Angela Marie Tyson	George W. Bush
235	Stacey Lamont Lawton	Black	31	M	14-Nov-2000	Smith	Dennis L. Price	George W. Bush
236	Tony Neyshea Chambers	Black	32	M	15-Nov-2000	Smith	Carenthia Marie Bailey	George W. Bush
237	Garry Dean Miller	White	33	M	05-Dec-2000	Jones	April Marie Wilson	George W. Bush
238	Daniel Joe Hittle	White	50	M	06-Dec-2000	Dallas	7 murder victims (Note: The 7 victims were: Garland police officer Gerald Walker, Mary Alice Good, Christy Condon, Richard Joseph Cook Jr., Raymond Scott Gregg, Henry Hittle, and Margaret Hittle. The first five victims were all killed in Texas while the Hittles were killed in Minnesota.)	George W. Bush
239	Claude Howard Jones	White	60	M	07-Dec-2000	San Jacinto	Allen Hilzendager	George W. Bush
2001 – 17 executions
240	Jack Wade Clark	White	37	M	09-Jan-2001	Lubbock	Melisa Ann Garcia	Rick Perry
241	Alvin Urial Goodwin III	White	37	M	18-Jan-2001	Montgomery	James Douglas Tillerson	Rick Perry
242	Caruthers Alexander	Black	52	M	29-Jan-2001	Bexar	Lori Bruch	Rick Perry
243	Adolph Gil Hernandez	Hispanic	50	M	08-Feb-2001	Lubbock	Elizabeth Alvarado	Rick Perry
244	Dennis Thurl Dowthitt	White	55	M	07-Mar-2001	Montgomery	Gracie Purnhagen and Tiffany Purnhagen	Rick Perry
245	Jason Eric Massey	White	28	M	03-Apr-2001	Ellis	Christina Benjamin and James Brian King	Rick Perry
246	David Lee Goff	Black	31	M	25-Apr-2001	Tarrant	Michael N. McGuire	Rick Perry
247	John Leslie Wheat	White	57	M	13-Jun-2001	Tarrant	Lacey Anderson, Ashley Ochoa, and Edwardo Ochoa	Rick Perry
248	Miguel A. Richardson	Black	46	M	26-Jun-2001	Bexar	John G. Ebbert and Howard Peters	Rick Perry
249	James Joseph Wilkens Jr.	White	39	M	11-Jul-2001	Smith	Larry W. McMillon Jr. and Richard Allan Wood	Rick Perry
250	Mack Oran Hill	White	47	M	08-Aug-2001	Lubbock (Note: On a change of venue from Montague.)	Donald Franklin Johnson	Rick Perry
251	Jeffrey Carlton Doughtie	White	39	M	16-Aug-2001	Nueces	Jerry Lee Dean and Sylvia Dean	Rick Perry
252	James Roy Knox	White	50	M	18-Sep-2001	Galveston	Joseph Sanchez	Rick Perry
253	Gerald Lee Mitchell	Black	33	M	22-Oct-2001	Harris	Charles Marino (Note: Also killed Hector Munguia, but was executed for killing Marino.)	Rick Perry
254	Jeffery Eugene Tucker	White	41	M	14-Nov-2001	Parker	Wilton B. Humphreys	Rick Perry
255	Emerson Edward Rudd	Black	31	M	15-Nov-2001	Dallas	Steve Morgan	Rick Perry
256	Vincent Edward Cooks	Black	37	M	12-Dec-2001	Dallas	Dallas police officer Gary Don McCarthy	Rick Perry
2002 – 33 executions								Rick Perry
257	Michael Patrick Moore	White	38	M	09-Jan-2002	Coryell	Christa E. Bentley	Rick Perry
258	Jermarr Carlos Arnold	Black	43	M	16-Jan-2002	Nueces	Christine Martie Sanchez	Rick Perry
259	Windell Broussard	Black	41	M	30-Jan-2002	Jefferson	Diana Fay Harris Broussard and Corey Harris	Rick Perry
260	Randall Wayne Hafdahl Sr. (Note: Also known as Jack Douglas Cone.)	White	48	M	31-Jan-2002	Randall	Amarillo police officer James Delbert Mitchell Jr.	Rick Perry
261	Monty Allen Delk	White	35	M	28-Feb-2002	Anderson	Gene Olan Allen II	Rick Perry
262	Gerald Wayne Tigner Jr.	Black	29	M	07-Mar-2002	McLennan	James Williams and Michael Watkins	Rick Perry
263	Jose Santellan Sr.	Hispanic	40	M	10-Apr-2002	Kerr	Yolanda Garza	Rick Perry
264	William Kendrick Burns	Black	43	M	11-Apr-2002	Bowie	Johnny Lynn Hamlett	Rick Perry
265	Gerald Dwight Casey	White	47	M	18-Apr-2002	Montgomery	Sonya Lynn Howell (Note: Also killed Lesia Michelle Jackson, but was executed for killing Howell.)	Rick Perry
266	Rodolpho Baiza Hernandez	Hispanic	54	M	30-Apr-2002	Comal	Victor Cervan	Rick Perry
267	Reginald Lenard Reeves	Black	28	M	09-May-2002	Red River	Jenny Lynn Weeks	Rick Perry
268	Ronford Lee Styron Jr.	White	32	M	16-May-2002	Liberty	Lee Hollis Styron	Rick Perry
269	Johnny Joe Martinez	Hispanic	29	M	22-May-2002	Nueces	Clay Peterson	Rick Perry
270	Napoleon Beazley	Black	25	M	28-May-2002	Smith	John Luttig	Rick Perry
271	Stanley Allison Baker Jr.	White	35	M	30-May-2002	Brazos	Wayne John Walters	Rick Perry
272	Daniel Earl Reneau	White	27	M	13-Jun-2002	Gillespie (Note: On a change of venue from Kerr.)	Kris Lee Keeran	Rick Perry
273	Robert Otis Coulson	White	34	M	25-Jun-2002	Harris	5 murder victims (Note: The 5 victims: Mary Coulson, Otis Coulson, Sarah Coulson, Robin Wentworth, and Richard Wentworth.)	Rick Perry
274	Jeffery Lynn Williams	Black	30	M	26-Jun-2002	Harris	Barbara Jackson Pullins	Rick Perry
275	Richard William Kutzner	White	59	M	07-Aug-2002	Montgomery	Kathryn Harrison and Reta Sharon Van Huss	Rick Perry
276	T. J. Jones	Black	25	M	08-Aug-2002	Gregg	Willard Lewis Davis	Rick Perry
277	Javier Suárez Medina	Hispanic	33	M	14-Aug-2002	Dallas	Dallas Police Officer Lawrence Rudy Cadena	Rick Perry
278	Gary Wayne Etheridge	White	38	M	20-Aug-2002	Brazoria	Christi Chauvierre	Rick Perry
279	Toronto Markkey Patterson	Black	24	M	28-Aug-2002	Dallas	Kimberly Brewer, Ollie Brown, and Jenifer Brewer	Rick Perry
280	Tony Lee Walker	Black	36	M	10-Sep-2002	Morris	Willie Simmons and Virginia Simmons	Rick Perry
281	Jessie Joe Patrick	White	44	M	17-Sep-2002	Dallas	Nina Rutherford Redd	Rick Perry
282	Ron Scott Shamburger	White	30	M	18-Sep-2002	Brazos	Lori Ann Baker	Rick Perry
283	Rex Warren Mays	White	42	M	24-Sep-2002	Harris	Kristin Wiley and Kynara Carreiro	Rick Perry
284	Calvin Eugene King	Black	48	M	25-Sep-2002	Jefferson	Billy Wayne Ezell	Rick Perry
285	James Rexford Powell	White	56	M	01-Oct-2002	Newton	Falyssa Van Winkle	Rick Perry
286	Craig Neil Ogan Jr.	White	47	M	19-Nov-2002	Harris	Houston police officer James C. Boswell	Rick Perry
287	William Wesley Chappell	White	66	M	20-Nov-2002	Tarrant	Alexandra Heath, Martha Lindsey, and Elbert Sitton	Rick Perry
288	Leonard Uresti Rojas	Hispanic	52	M	04-Dec-2002	Johnson	JoAnn Reed and David Rojas	Rick Perry
289	James Paul Collier	White	55	M	11-Dec-2002	Wichita	Gwendolyn Joy Reed and Timothy Reed	Rick Perry
2003 – 24 executions								Rick Perry
290	Samuel Clark Gallamore	White	31	M	14-Jan-2003	Comal	Verle Clayton Kenney, Juliana Kenney, and Adrienne Arnot	Rick Perry
291	John Richard Baltazar	Hispanic	30	M	15-Jan-2003	Nueces	Adriana Nicole Marines	Rick Perry
292	Robert Andrew Lookingbill	White	37	M	22-Jan-2003	Hidalgo	Adeline Wuanita Dannenberg	Rick Perry
293	Alva Eziel Curry	Black	32	M	28-Jan-2003	Travis	David Vela	Rick Perry
294	Richard Eugene Dinkins	White	40	M	29-Jan-2003	Jefferson	Katherine Thompson and Shelly Cutler	Rick Perry
295	Granville Riddle	White	33	M	30-Jan-2003	Potter	Ronnie Hood Bennett	Rick Perry
296	John William Elliott	Hispanic	42	M	04-Feb-2003	Travis	Joyce Munguia	Rick Perry
297	Henry Earl Dunn Jr.	Black	28	M	06-Feb-2003	Smith	Nicolas West	Rick Perry
298	Richard Head Williams	Black	33	M	25-Feb-2003	Harris	Jeanette Williams	Rick Perry
299	Bobby Glen Cook	White	41	M	11-Mar-2003	Anderson	Edwin Earl Holder	Rick Perry
300	Keith Bernard Clay	Black	35	M	20-Mar-2003	Harris	Melathethil Tom Varughese	Rick Perry
301	James Blake Colburn	White	43	M	26-Mar-2003	Montgomery	Peggy Murphy	Rick Perry
302	Juan Rodriguez Chavez	Hispanic	34	M	22-Apr-2003	Dallas	12 murder victims (Note: The 12 victims were: Vincente Mendoza, Jose Castillo, Juan Pablo Hernandez, Jose Vasquez Morales, Susan Ferguson, Jesus Briseno, Alfonso Contreras, Maria Guadalupe Delgadillo-Pena, Antonio Rios, Manuel Duran, Antonio Banda, and Juan Carlos Macias.)	Rick Perry
303	Roger Dale Vaughn	White	48	M	06-May-2003	Wilbarger	Dora Watkins	Rick Perry
304	Bruce Charles Jacobs	White	56	M	15-May-2003	Dallas	Conrad Harris	Rick Perry
305	Kia Levoy Johnson	Black	38	M	11-Jun-2003	Bexar	William Matthew Rains	Rick Perry
306	Hilton Lewis Crawford	White	64	M	02-Jul-2003	Montgomery	Samuel McKay Everett	Rick Perry
307	Christopher Black Sr.	Black	43	M	09-Jul-2003	Bell	Gwendolyn Black, Christina Black, and Katrese Houston	Rick Perry
308	Cedric Lamont Ransom	Black	29	M	23-Jul-2003	Tarrant	Herbert P. Primm Jr.	Rick Perry
309	Allen Wayne Janecka	White	53	M	24-Jul-2003	Harris	4 murder victims (Note: The 4 victims were: Gertrude Duff-Smith Zabolio, John Wanstrath, Diana Wanstrath, and Kevin Wanstrath.)	Rick Perry
310	Larry Allen Hayes	White	54	M	10-Sep-2003	Montgomery	Mary Evelyn Hayes and Rosalyn Ann Robinson	Rick Perry
311	Robert Lloyd Henry	White	41	M	20-Nov-2003	San Patricio	Carol Lea Arnold and Hazel Rumohr	Rick Perry
312	Richard Charles Duncan	White	61	M	03-Dec-2003	Harris	John Abner High and Ruth Brown High	Rick Perry
313	Ivan Ray Murphy Jr.	White	38	M	04-Dec-2003	Grayson	Lula Mae Denning	Rick Perry
2004 – 23 executions								Rick Perry
314	Ynobe Katron Matthews	Black	27	M	06-Jan-2004	Brazos	Carolyn Casey (Note: Also killed Jamie Hart, but was executed for killing Casey.)	Rick Perry
315	Kenneth Eugene Bruce	Black	32	M	14-Jan-2004	Collin	Helen Elizabeth Ayers	Rick Perry
316	Kevin Lee Zimmerman	White	42	M	21-Jan-2004	Jefferson	Leslie Gilbert Hooks	Rick Perry
317	Billy Frank Vickers	White	58	M	28-Jan-2004	Lamar	Phillip Kinslow	Rick Perry
318	Edward Lewis Lagrone	Black	46	M	11-Feb-2004	Tarrant	4 murder victims (Note: The 4 victims were: Michael Anthony Jones, Shakeisha Lloyd, Zenobia Anderson, and Carola Lloyd.)	Rick Perry
319	Bobby Ray Hopkins	Black	36	M	12-Feb-2004	Johnson	Jennifer Westin and Sandi Marbut	Rick Perry
320	Cameron Todd Willingham	White	36	M	17-Feb-2004	Navarro	Amber Louise Kuykendall, Karmen Diane Willingham, and Kameron Marie Willingham	Rick Perry
321	Marcus Bridger Cotton	Black	29	M	03-Mar-2004	Harris	Gil Epstein	Rick Perry
322	Kelsey Patterson	Black	50	M	18-May-2004	Anderson	Louis Oates and Dorothy Harris	Rick Perry
323	David Ray Harris	White	43	M	30-Jun-2004	Jefferson	Mark Mays	Rick Perry
324	Jasen Shane Busby	White	28	M	25-Aug-2004	Cherokee	Tennille Thompson and Brandy Gray	Rick Perry
325	James Vernon Allridge III	Black	41	M	26-Aug-2004	Tarrant	Brian Clendennen	Rick Perry
326	Andrew Perez Flores	Hispanic	32	M	21-Sep-2004	Bexar	Juan Gabriel Moreno	Rick Perry
327	Edward Green III	Black	30	M	05-Oct-2004	Harris	Edward Perry Haden and Helen Halphen O'Sullivan	Rick Perry
328	Peter J. Miniel	Hispanic	42	M	06-Oct-2004	Harris	Paul Manier	Rick Perry
329	Donald Loren Aldrich	White	39	M	12-Oct-2004	Kerr	Nicholas West	Rick Perry
330	Ricky Eugene Morrow	White	53	M	20-Oct-2004	Dallas	Mark A. Frazier	Rick Perry
331	Dominique Jerome Green	Black	30	M	26-Oct-2004	Harris	Andrew Lastrapes Jr.	Rick Perry
332	Lorenzo Morris	Black	52	M	02-Nov-2004	Harris	Jesse Fields	Rick Perry
333	Robert Brice Morrow	White	47	M	04-Nov-2004	Liberty	Myra Elisabeth Allison	Rick Perry
334	Demarco Markeith McCullum	Black	30	M	09-Nov-2004	Harris	Michael James Burzinski	Rick Perry
335	Frederick Patrick McWilliams	Black	30	M	10-Nov-2004	Harris	Alfonso Rodriguez	Rick Perry
336	Anthony Guy Fuentes	Hispanic	30	M	17-Nov-2004	Harris	Robert Tate	Rick Perry
2005 – 19 executions								Rick Perry
337	James Scott Porter	White	33	M	04-Jan-2005	Bowie	Rudy Delgado	Rick Perry
338	Troy Albert Kunkle	White	38	M	25-Jan-2005	Nueces	Steven Wayne Horton	Rick Perry
339	Dennis Wayne Bagwell	White	41	M	17-Feb-2005	Atascosa	4 murder victims (Note: The 4 victims were: Leona McBee, Tassy Boone, Libby Best, and Reba Best.)	Rick Perry
340	George Anderson Hopper	White	49	M	08-Mar-2005	Dallas	Rozanne Gailiunas	Rick Perry
341	Douglas Alan Roberts	White	42	M	20-Apr-2005	Kendall	Jerry Velez	Rick Perry
342	Lonnie Wayne Pursley	White	43	M	03-May-2005	Polk	Robert Earl Cook	Rick Perry
343	Bryan Eric Wolfe	Black	44	M	18-May-2005	Jefferson	Bertha Lemell	Rick Perry
344	Richard Michael Cartwright	White	31	M	19-May-2005	Nueces	Nick Moraida	Rick Perry
345	Alexander Rey Martinez	Hispanic	28	M	07-Jun-2005	Harris	Helen Joyce	Rick Perry
346	David Aaron Martinez	Hispanic	29	M	28-Jul-2005	Travis	Kiersa Paul	Rick Perry
347	Gary Lynn Sterling	Black	38	M	10-Aug-2005	Navarro	4 murder victims (Note: The 4 victims were: John Wesley Carty, Deloris June Smith, William Porter, and Leroy Porter.)	Rick Perry
348	Robert Alan Shields Jr.	White	30	M	23-Aug-2005	Galveston	Paula Stiner	Rick Perry
349	Frances Elaine Newton	Black	40	F	14-Sep-2005	Harris	Adrian Newton, Alton Newton, and Farrah Newton	Rick Perry
350	Ronald Ray Howard	Black	32	M	06-Oct-2005	Travis	TDPS state trooper Bill Davidson	Rick Perry
351	Luis L. Ramirez	Hispanic	42	M	20-Oct-2005	Tom Green	Nemecio Nandin	Rick Perry
352	Melvin Wayne White	White	55	M	03-Nov-2005	Pecos	Jennifer Lee Gravell	Rick Perry
353	Charles Daniel Thacker	White	37	M	09-Nov-2005	Harris	Karen Gail Crawford	Rick Perry
354	Robert Dale Rowell	White	50	M	15-Nov-2005	Harris	Raymond David Mata and Irving Wright	Rick Perry
355	Shannon Charles Thomas	Black	34	M	16-Nov-2005	Harris	Roberto Rios, Maria Rios, and Victor Rios	Rick Perry
2006 – 24 executions								Rick Perry
356	Marion Butler Dudley	Black	33	M	25-Jan-2006	Harris	4 murder victims (Note: The 4 victims were: Jose Tovar, Jessica Quiñones, Frank Farias, and Audrey Brown.)	Rick Perry
357	Jaime Elizalde Jr.	Hispanic	34	M	31-Jan-2006	Harris	Juan Saenz Guajardo and Marcos Sanchez Vasquez	Rick Perry
358	Robert James Neville Jr.	White	31	M	08-Feb-2006	Tarrant	Amy Robinson	Rick Perry
359	Clyde Smith Jr.	Black	32	M	15-Feb-2006	Harris	David Jacobs (Note: Also killed Victor Bilton, but was executed for killing Jacobs.)	Rick Perry
360	Tommie Collins Hughes	Black	31	M	15-Mar-2006	Dallas	Foluke Erinkitola and Roxanne Mendoza	Rick Perry
361	Robert Madrid Salazar Jr.	Hispanic	27	M	22-Mar-2006	Lubbock	Adriana Gomez	Rick Perry
362	Kevin Christopher Kincy	Black	38	M	29-Mar-2006	Harris	Jerome Harville	Rick Perry
363	Jackie Barron Wilson	White	39	M	04-May-2006	Dallas	Lottie Margaret Rhodes	Rick Perry
364	Jermaine Herron	Black	27	M	17-May-2006	Refugio	Betsy Nutt and Cody Nutt	Rick Perry
365	Jesús Ledesma Aguilar	Hispanic	42	M	24-May-2006	Cameron	Leonardo Chavez and Annette Chavez	Rick Perry
366	Timothy Tyler Titsworth	White	34	M	06-Jun-2006	Randall	Christina Marie Sossaman	Rick Perry
367	Lamont D. Reese	Black	28	M	20-Jun-2006	Tarrant	Riki Jackson, Alonzo Stewart, and Anthony Roney	Rick Perry
368	Ángel Maturino Reséndiz	Hispanic	46	M	27-Jun-2006	Harris	14 murder victims (Note: The 14 victims were: Michael White, Leafie Mason, Claudia Benton, Norman J. Sirnic, Karen Sirnic, Noemi Dominguez, Josephine Konvicka, Jesse Howell, Wendy Von Huben, Roberto Castro, Christopher Maier, Fannie Whitney Byers, George Morber Sr., and Carolyn Frederick. The first seven victims were all killed in Texas. Of the other seven, Howell and Von Huben were killed in Florida, Castro in California, Maier in Kentucky, Byers in Georgia, and Morber and Frederick in Illinois.)	Rick Perry
369	Sean Derrick O'Brien	Black	31	M	11-Jul-2006	Harris	Jennifer Lee Ertman and Elizabeth Christine Peña (Note: Also killed Patricia Lopez, but was executed for killing Ertman and Peña.)	Rick Perry
370	Mauriceo Mashawn Brown	Black	31	M	19-Jul-2006	Bexar	Michael LaHood Jr.	Rick Perry
371	Robert James Anderson	White	40	M	20-Jul-2006	Potter	Audra Ann Reeves	Rick Perry
372	William E. Wyatt Jr.	Black	41	M	03-Aug-2006	Bowie	Damien Willis	Rick Perry
373	Richard Hinojosa	Hispanic	43	M	17-Aug-2006	Bexar	Terry Wright	Rick Perry
374	Justin Chaz Fuller	Black	27	M	24-Aug-2006	Smith	Donald Whittington III	Rick Perry
375	Derrick Wayne Frazier	Black	29	M	31-Aug-2006	Refugio	Betsy Nutt and Cody Nutt	Rick Perry
376	Farley Charles Matchett	Black	43	M	12-Sep-2006	Harris	Uries Anderson (Note: Also killed Melonee Josey, but was executed for killing Anderson.)	Rick Perry
377	Gregory Lynn Summers	White	48	M	25-Oct-2006	Denton	Gene Summers, Helen Summers, and Billy Mack Summers	Rick Perry
378	Donell Okeith Jackson	Black	33	M	01-Nov-2006	Harris	Mario Stubblefield	Rick Perry
379	Willie Marcel Shannon	Black	33	M	08-Nov-2006	Harris	Benjamin Garza	Rick Perry
2007 – 26 executions								Rick Perry
380	Carlos Alberto Granados	Hispanic	36	M	10-Jan-2007	Williamson	Anthony Jiminez	Rick Perry
381	Jonathan Bryant Moore	White	32	M	17-Jan-2007	Bexar	San Antonio police officer Fabian Dale Dominquez	Rick Perry
382	Christopher Jay Swift	White	31	M	30-Jan-2007	Denton	Amy Amel Sabeh-Swift and Sandra Stevens Sabeh	Rick Perry
383	James Lewis Jackson	Black	47	M	07-Feb-2007	Harris	Sharon Jackson, Ericka Mayes, and Sonceria Mayes	Rick Perry
384	Newton Burton Anderson	White	30	M	22-Feb-2007	Smith	Frank Cobb and Bertha Cobb	Rick Perry
385	Donald Anthony Miller	White	44	M	27-Feb-2007	Harris	Michael Mozingo and Kenneth Whitt	Rick Perry
386	Robert Anthony Martinez Perez	Hispanic	48	M	06-Mar-2007	Dallas	Jose Travieso and Robert Rivas	Rick Perry
387	Joseph Bennard Nichols	Black	45	M	07-Mar-2007	Harris	Claude Schaffer Jr.	Rick Perry
388	Charles Anthony Nealy	Black	42	M	20-Mar-2007	Dallas	Jiten Bhakta and Vijay Patel	Rick Perry
389	Vincent Gutierrez	Hispanic	28	M	28-Mar-2007	Bexar	Jose Cobo	Rick Perry
390	Roy Lee Pippin	White	51	M	29-Mar-2007	Harris	Elmer Buitrago and Fabio Buitrago	Rick Perry
391	James Lee Clark	White	38	M	11-Apr-2007	Denton	Shari Catherine Crews and Jesus Garza	Rick Perry
392	Ryan Heath Dickson	White	30	M	26-Apr-2007	Potter	Marie Surace and Carmelo Surace	Rick Perry
393	Charles Edward Smith	White	41	M	16-May-2007	Pecos	Pecos County Sheriff's Deputy Tim Hudson	Rick Perry
394	Michael Durwood Griffith	White	56	M	06-Jun-2007	Harris	Deborah McCormick	Rick Perry
395	Lionell Gonzales Rodriguez	Hispanic	36	M	20-Jun-2007	Harris	Tracy Gee	Rick Perry
396	Gilberto Guadalupe Reyes	Hispanic	33	M	21-Jun-2007	Bailey	Yvette Barraz	Rick Perry
397	Patrick Bryan Knight	White	39	M	26-Jun-2007	Randall	Walter Werner and Mary Ann Werner	Rick Perry
398	Lonnie Earl Johnson	Black	44	M	24-Jul-2007	Harris	Sean Fulk Schulz and Leroy McCaffrey Jr.	Rick Perry
399	Kenneth Ray Parr	Black	27	M	15-Aug-2007	Matagorda	Linda Malek	Rick Perry
400	Johnny Ray Conner	Black	32	M	22-Aug-2007	Harris	Kathyanna Nguyen	Rick Perry
401	DaRoyce Lamont Mosley	Black	32	M	28-Aug-2007	Gregg	4 murder victims (Note: The 4 victims were: Patricia Colter, Duane Colter, Luva Congleton, and Alvin Waller.)	Rick Perry
402	John Joe Amador	Hispanic	32	M	29-Aug-2007	Bexar	Reza Ayari	Rick Perry
403	Tony Roach	White	30	M	05-Sep-2007	Potter	Ronnie Dawn Hewitt	Rick Perry
404	Clifford Allan Kimmel	White	32	M	20-Sep-2007	Bexar	Rachel White, Susan Halverstadt, and Brent Roe	Rick Perry
405	Michael Wayne Richard	Black	48	M	25-Sep-2007	Harris	Marguerite Dixon	Rick Perry
2008 – 18 executions								Rick Perry
406	Karl Eugene Chamberlain	White	37	M	11-Jun-2008	Dallas	Felicia Prechtl	Rick Perry
407	Carlton Akee Turner Jr.	Black	29	M	10-Jul-2008	Dallas	Carlton Turner and Tonya Turner	Rick Perry
408	Derrick Juan Sonnier-Bey	Black	40	M	23-Jul-2008	Harris	Melody Flowers and Patrick Flowers	Rick Perry
409	Larry Donell Davis	Black	40	M	31-Jul-2008	Potter	Michael Barrow	Rick Perry
410	José Ernesto Medellín Rojas	Hispanic	33	M	05-Aug-2008	Harris	Jennifer Lee Ertman and Elizabeth Christine Peña (Note: Also killed Patricia Lopez, but was executed for killing Ertman and Peña.)	Rick Perry
411	Heliberto Chi Aceituno	Hispanic	29	M	07-Aug-2008	Tarrant	Armand Paliotta	Rick Perry
412	Leon David Dorsey IV	Black	32	M	12-Aug-2008	Dallas	James Armstrong and Brad Lindsay (Note: Also killed Hyon Suk Chon, but was executed for killing Armstrong and Lindsey.)	Rick Perry
413	Michael Anthony Rodriguez	Hispanic	45	M	14-Aug-2008	Dallas	Irving police officer Aubrey Wright Hawkins (Note: Also killed Theresa Rodriguez, but was executed for killing Hawkins.)	Rick Perry
414	William Alfred Murray	White	39	M	17-Sep-2008	Kaufman	Rena Ratcliff	Rick Perry
415	Alvin Andrew Kelly	White	57	M	14-Oct-2008	Gregg	4 murder victims (Note: The 4 victims were: Jerry Morgan, Brenda Morgan, Devin Morgan, and John Ford.)	Rick Perry
416	Kevin Michael Watts	Black	27	M	16-Oct-2008	Bexar	Hak Po Kim, Chae Sun Shook, and Yuan Tzu Banks	Rick Perry
417	Joseph Ray Ries	White	29	M	21-Oct-2008	Hopkins	Robert Lee Ratliff	Rick Perry
418	Eric Charles Nenno	White	47	M	28-Oct-2008	Harris	Nicole Benton	Rick Perry
419	Gregory Edward Wright	White	42	M	30-Oct-2008	Dallas	Donna Duncan Vick	Rick Perry
420	Elkie Lee Taylor	Black	46	M	06-Nov-2008	Tarrant	Otis Flake	Rick Perry
421	George H. Whitaker III	Black	36	M	12-Nov-2008	Harris	Shakeitha Shanta Carrier	Rick Perry
422	Denard Sha Manns	Black	42	M	13-Nov-2008	Bell	Michelle Robson	Rick Perry
423	Robert Jean Hudson	Black	45	M	20-Nov-2008	Dallas	Edith Kendrick	Rick Perry
2009 – 24 executions								Rick Perry
424	Curtis Moore	Black	40	M	14-Jan-2009	Tarrant	Roderick Moore, LaTanya Boone, and Henry Truevillian Jr.	Rick Perry
425	Frank Moore	Black	49	M	21-Jan-2009	Bexar	Samuel Boyd and Patrick Clark	Rick Perry
426	Reginald Perkins	Black	53	M	22-Jan-2009	Tarrant	Gertie Mae Perkins (Note: Also killed Hattie Wilson and Shirley Douglas, but was executed for killing Perkins.)	Rick Perry
427	Virgil Euristi Martinez	Hispanic	41	M	28-Jan-2009	Brazoria	4 murder victims (Note: The 4 victims were: Veronica Fuentes, Cassandra Fuentes, Joshua Fuentes, and John Gomez.)	Rick Perry
428	Ricardo Samaniego Ortiz	Hispanic	46	M	29-Jan-2009	El Paso	Gerardo Garcia	Rick Perry
429	David Martinez	Hispanic	36	M	04-Feb-2009	Bexar	Carolina Prado and Erik Prado	Rick Perry
430	Dale Devon Scheanette	Black	35	M	10-Feb-2009	Tarrant	Wendie Prescott (Note: Also killed Christine Huyen Vu, but was executed for killing Prescott.)	Rick Perry
431	Johnny Ray Johnson	Black	51	M	12-Feb-2009	Harris	Leah Joette Smith	Rick Perry
432	Willie Earl Pondexter Jr.	Black	34	M	03-Mar-2009	Red River	Martha Lennox	Rick Perry
433	Kenneth Wayne Morris	Black	38	M	04-Mar-2009	Harris	James Adams	Rick Perry
434	James Edward Martinez	Hispanic	34	M	10-Mar-2009	Tarrant	Sandra Walton and Michael Humphreys	Rick Perry
435	Luis Cervantes Salazar	Hispanic	38	M	11-Mar-2009	Bexar	Martha Sanchez (Note: Also killed Melissa Michelle Morales, but was executed for killing Sanchez.)	Rick Perry
436	Michael Flores Rosales	Hispanic	35	M	15-Apr-2009	Lubbock	Mary Felder	Rick Perry
437	Derrick Lamone Johnson	Black	28	M	30-Apr-2009	Dallas	LaTausha Curry	Rick Perry
438	Michael Lynn Riley	Black	51	M	19-May-2009	Wood	Wynona Harris	Rick Perry
439	Terry Lee Hankins	White	34	M	02-Jun-2009	Tarrant	5 murder victims (Note: The 5 victims were: Pearl Sevenstar, Ernie Hankins, Tammy Hankins, Kevin Galley, and Ashley Mason.)	Rick Perry
440	Stephen Lindsey Moody	White	52	M	16-Sep-2009	Harris	Joseph Hall	Rick Perry
441	Christopher Bernard Coleman	Black	37	M	22-Sep-2009	Harris	Heimar Prado Hurtado, Jose Luis Garcia-Castro, and Danny Giraldo	Rick Perry
442	Reginald Winthrop Blanton	Black	28	M	27-Oct-2009	Bexar	Carlos Garza	Rick Perry
443	Khristian Phillip Oliver	White	32	M	05-Nov-2009	Nacogdoches	Joe Preston Collins	Rick Perry
444	Yosvanis Valle	Hispanic	34	M	10-Nov-2009	Harris	Jose Junco	Rick Perry
445	Danielle Nathaniel Simpson	Black	30	M	18-Nov-2009	Anderson	Geraldine Davidson	Rick Perry
446	Robert Lee Thompson	Black	34	M	19-Nov-2009	Harris	Mansoor Mohammed	Rick Perry
447	Bobby Wayne Woods	White	44	M	03-Dec-2009	Llano	Sarah Patterson	Rick Perry
Sources: List of executed offenders by the TDJC since 1982, and The Espy File: 1608–2002.

Preceded by List of people executed in Texas, 1990–1999	Lists of people executed in Texas	Succeeded by List of people executed in Texas, 2010–2019

== See also ==
- Capital punishment in Texas
- List of people executed in Texas, 2020–present
