= Richard Edwin Fox =

American murderer

- Mug shot of Richard Edwin Fox.
- Born: February 3, 1956; Bowling Green, Ohio, U.S.
- Died: February 12, 2003 (aged 47); Southern Ohio Correctional Facility, Ohio, U.S.
- Occupation: Cook
- Spouse: Kim Swinehart Fox (died 1983)
- Status: Executed by lethal injection
- Motive: Violent reaction to rejection of sexual advances
- Convictions: Aggravated murder Kidnapping
- Penalty: Death (June 27, 1990)

Richard Edwin Fox (February 3, 1956 – February 12, 2003) was an American murderer who was executed by the state of Ohio for the kidnapping and murder of an 18-year-old college student whom he lured to her death with the fake promise of a job interview. He was also suspected of killing his wife in Oregon in 1983.

A three-judge panel convicted Fox of aggravated murder and kidnapping and sentenced him to death on June 27, 1990. He spent 12 years, 7 months, and 16 days on death row as his case was appealed through the state and federal court systems.

== Wife's death ==
In 1983, Fox's estranged wife, Kim Swinehart Fox, was found dead in Oregon. Shortly before their final divorce hearing, she was found with her arms and head over the side of a bathtub in her apartment. Her wrists had been slit. However, the coroner determined that she died from asphyxiation as a result of neck compression, not blood loss.

== The crime ==
The crime for which Fox paid with his life was his first criminal conviction, but Fox had been increasingly aggressive toward women in the months before the murder of 18-year-old Leslie Renae Keckler, testimony at his trial revealed. The victim of a previous encounter with Fox helped police break the case.

On September 14, 1989, Leslie Keckler applied for a waitress job at a Bowling Green restaurant where Fox worked as a grill cook. As Keckler was filling out her job application, Fox pointed out Keckler to a coworker and said, "I'd like to have some of that," the coworker testified later. Fox gleaned Keckler's telephone number from the application and asked her to meet him for an interview for a restaurant supply sales job.

On September 26, Keckler went to a local motel where Fox had arranged the job interview. Keckler's boyfriend saw her just before she left, and Keckler told him she might be gone for two or three hours. When Keckler did not return that night, her boyfriend and mother filed a missing persons report with the police. Police found the car Keckler had been driving abandoned at a local mall.

Two boys riding bicycles found Keckler's body in a rural drainage ditch four days later. Keckler was still wearing her new black dress and leather jacket. However, a clasp on her brassiere was broken, her belt was unbuckled, two dress buttons were missing, and her pantyhose was torn in the crotch. Aside from a nearby shoe, police found no other evidence at the scene.

== Wounds ==
The autopsy revealed that Keckler had died as a result of asphyxia from ligature strangulation and multiple stab wounds. She had been stabbed six times in the back; three stab wounds penetrated her lungs. Her right wrist had a deep defensive wound gash, and her face had bruises on her left eye, upper lip, and nose consistent with blunt force injury. The coroner found no signs of sexual assault.

== Previous attack ==
When Keckler's murder was publicized, another Bowling Green woman came forward with a similar story. She had applied for work at a restaurant and received an invitation for an interview for a different position from a man referred to as "Jeff Bennett" but who was later positively identified as Fox. He asked her to come to a local motel—the same one that Keckler was headed—to discuss the job opportunity.

After meeting Fox, she agreed to accompany him in his car that evening to discuss the job. They drove for a while and then parked. Fox began making suggestive comments and told the woman he thought her dress was too long. She realized she had been duped and told Fox she was uninterested in any job.

In response, Fox asked what the woman would do if someone "pulled a knife" on her and asked her for money or "to do other things." At that moment, the woman jumped out of the car as Fox tried to grab her and said, "come back," and that he "wasn't finished with [her] yet."

She made a safe getaway but did not report the incident to police until after Keckler disappeared. The woman provided police with a sketch of her assailant.

== Investigation ==
A check of the employees at the restaurants where the two women applied for jobs revealed an interesting coincidence: Fox was employed at both places. Other circumstantial evidence made Fox their prime suspect. On October 2, an acquaintance of Fox told police that the composite sketch resembled Richard Fox of Tontogany. Police confirmed that Fox matched the description of "Bennett" and Fox's car also matched the description of "Bennett's" car.

That same day, police secured a search warrant for Fox's car and found some "suspicious items". They asked Fox to come to the station to answer a few questions and he voluntarily accompanied them.

Before Fox was placed under arrest, he admitted that in early May he had worked at a restaurant where his first intended victim had applied for a job, that he met her at the motel, and that he took her for a drive and discussed her skirt length.

== Arrest and admissions ==
After his arrest and after being advised of his Miranda rights, Fox admitted he knew Keckler and claimed they had met and spoke at the restaurant where he worked and met again a couple of days later. He described his encounter with Keckler at the motel on September 26 as a date. Later, at the mall, "he saw Leslie and they talked and ended up taking a drive in his car". Fox said that he and Keckler parked, and "things were getting warmed up". However, "then Leslie did not want to participate". She called him "an asshole" and started to get out of the car. Fox told detectives, "no one calls me an asshole". Fox grabbed the woman by the coat as she was standing up to get out of the car and pulled her back in, then he pulled the coat up over her head.

Fox told police he got a knife out of the glove compartment and stabbed Keckler in the back, after which he got a rope out of the trunk "just to make sure she was dead" and strangled her. He took police to a rural location outside Bowling Green where he dumped Keckler's purse and other property.

== Clemency hearing and execution ==
At Fox's clemency hearing (where the parole board lists to arguments for and against recommending that the governor commute a death sentence) it was revealed that Fox had written a letter apologizing to the Keckler family for his actions:

If I could, I would sit down with my victim's family and try and share how sorry I am, how I have changed and how I wish I could change what happened. I am sorry, and I must pay for my actions, if it be with a life in prison or if it be by my life, I will do what is required as I know I must pay for my mistakes!

Neither that letter nor his teenage daughter's tearful plea not to be made an orphan (her mother had earlier committed suicide) swayed the parole board. Fox was sentenced to death, and spent the next 12 years, 7 months, and 16 days on death row at the Southern Ohio Correctional Facility in Lucasville. On Wednesday, February 12, 2003, Fox was executed by lethal injection. Fox made no statement before he was injected with the deadly chemicals. The execution took a total of 13 minutes from the time the first chemical was started until Fox was pronounced dead.

== See also ==
- Capital punishment in Ohio
- Capital punishment in the United States
- List of people executed in Ohio
- List of people executed in the United States in 2003

== General references ==
- Richard Edwin Fox The Clark County Prosecuting Attorney. Accessed on 2007-11-05.
- 2006 Capital Crimes Annual Report (PDF). Ohio Attorney General's Office (2007-04-01). Accessed on 2007-11-05.
- "Death row inmate apologizes to victim's family in letter". The Associated Press (2003-01-08).
- "Man about to be executed had pattern of luring young women". The Associated Press State & Local Wire (2003-02-07).
- "Ohio performs 4th execution in year". United Press International (2003-02-12).
- State v. Fox, 69 Ohio St. 3d 183

Executions carried out in Ohio
Preceded by Robert Anthony Buell September 25, 2002	Richard Edwin Fox; February 12, 2003	Succeeded by David M. Brewer April 29, 2003
Executions carried out in the United States
Preceded by Henry Dunn Jr. – Texas February 6, 2003	Richard Edwin Fox – Ohio; February 12, 2003	Succeeded by Bobby Fields – Texas February 13, 2003
