= Brownstone Lane murders =

1992 mass murder case in Houston, Texas

Marion Dudley
- TDCJ mugshot of Dudley
- Born: Marion Butler Dudley; May 13, 1972; Tuscaloosa, Alabama, U.S.
- Died: January 25, 2006 (aged 33); Huntsville Unit, Huntsville, Texas, U.S.
- Cause of death: Execution by lethal injection
- Conviction: Capital murder
- Penalty: Death (January 23, 1995)

Details
- Date: June 20, 1992
- Country: United States
- Location: Houston, Texas
- Killed: 4
- Injured: 2
- Date apprehended: July 8, 1992

Arthur Brown Jr.
- 1994 TCDJ Mugshot of Brown
- Born: August 14, 1970; Los Angeles, California, U.S.
- Died: March 9, 2023 (aged 52); Huntsville Unit, Huntsville, Texas, U.S.
- Cause of death: Execution by lethal injection
- Other name: Squirt
- Conviction: Capital murder
- Penalty: Death (November 1993)

Details
- Date: June 20, 1992
- Country: United States
- Location: Houston, Texas
- Killed: 4
- Injured: 2
- Date apprehended: October 23, 1992

Tony Dunson
- Born: Antonia Lamone Dunson; November 7, 1972 (age 53); Alabama, U.S.
- Status: Incarcerated
- Conviction: Capital murder
- Penalty: Life imprisonment

Details
- Date: June 20, 1992
- Country: United States
- Location: Houston, Texas
- Killed: 4
- Injured: 2
- Date apprehended: July 8, 1992
- Imprisoned at: Huntsville Unit

The Brownstone Lane murders were the mass murders of four people at a residence on Brownstone Lane in Houston, Texas, United States. On June 20, 1992, three men tied up six people and shot all of them in the head execution-style. Four of the six victims died. The perpetrators: Marion Butler Dudley (May 13, 1972 – January 25, 2006), Arthur "Squirt" Brown Jr. (August 14, 1970 – March 9, 2023), and Antonia "Tony" Lamone Dunson (born November 7, 1972) were convicted of capital murder. Dudley and Brown were sentenced to death, while Dunson was sentenced to life in prison.

Dudley and Brown were executed by lethal injection at the Huntsville Unit in Huntsville, Texas. Dudley was executed on January 25, 2006, and Brown was executed on March 9, 2023. Dunson remains incarcerated at the Huntsville Unit and is eligible for parole in 2027.

== Murders ==
On June 20, 1992, four people were shot and killed during a drug deal at a residence on Brownstone Lane in Houston, Texas. Marion Dudley, Arthur Brown Jr., and Tony Dunson had gone to the home of Jose and Rachel Tovar to buy three kilograms of cocaine when they decided to rob them of their drugs and money. Six people were bound and shot by the trio inside the home. By the time police arrived, three victims were dead: Jose Tovar, Jessica Quiñones (seven months pregnant), and Frank Farias. Of the three survivors, one, Audrey Brown, later died in a hospital, making the total number of murder victims four. The remaining two survivors identified Marion Dudley, Arthur Brown Jr., and Tony Dunson as their attackers.

== Aftermath ==
After the murders, the perpetrators fled the area. When they learned they were suspects in the murders and wanted by the police; they fled town. The trio bought a Jeep Cherokee and convinced two women to drive them from Birmingham, Alabama to Louisville, Kentucky. Once there, they purchased plane tickets to Ohio under assumed names. They then left Columbus and headed north. Police found a sports vehicle they believed belonged to Dudley, but it offered them no new leads. The mothers of Dudley, Brown, and Dunson asked them to turn themselves in but believed they were innocent.

On July 8, 1992, Dudley and Dunson were captured at a mobile home in Fayetteville, North Carolina. On October 23, 1992, Brown was captured by members of the Tuscaloosa County Metro Homicide Unit at an apartment in Northport, Alabama.

== Trials ==
Following their arrests, all three suspects were charged with capital murder. Prosecutors announced they would seek the death penalty for Brown and Dudley, but not Dunson.

Arthur "Squirt" Brown Jr. (unrelated to victim Audrey Brown) was convicted of capital murder. In November 1993, he was sentenced to death. He was the first of the three perpetrators to be convicted.

Marion Butler Dudley was also convicted of capital murder and was the second of the three perpetrators to be convicted. On January 23, 1995, he was sentenced to death.

Antonia Lamone Dunson was convicted of capital murder and given a life sentence. As of July 2025, he is still in prison and is eligible for parole on July 8, 2027.

== Subsequent developments ==
=== Dudley's execution ===
Dudley was executed by lethal injection on January 25, 2006, in Huntsville, Texas. He became the first person to be executed by the state of Texas in 2006.

Dudley refused to walk to the execution chamber and had to be carried. When asked if he had a final statement to make, he ignored the warden and kept his eyes shut. Taken as a decline, the drugs were administered, and eight minutes later, at 6:16 p.m., he was pronounced dead. He proclaimed his innocence to the very end and denied ever being at the home when the shootings occurred.

One of the wounded victims, Rachel Tovar, went to go and watch the execution, and said afterward that she “can be at peace, knowing that I represent my family, my children, my husband.”

=== Brown's appeals and execution ===
Brown repeatedly attempted to appeal his conviction. In August 2014, Brown lost a federal court appeal after arguing he should be provided $7,500 to pay for a mitigation specialist to assist him with his clemency petition. A federal district court refused, and the 5th U.S. Circuit Court of Appeals upheld the lower court's rejection. In October 2017, Brown lost another appeal when the Texas Court of Criminal Appeals denied him a new trial or new sentencing phase.

In April 2022, a judge in the 351st District Court was expected to sign Brown's death warrant, who had exhausted all of his appeals. In May 2022, prosecutors and defense attorneys attempted to sway a Harris County judge to decide on Brown's death warrant. Prosecutors attempted to sway the judge to set an August 31 execution date for Brown, while his lawyers argued he had an intellectual disability and was therefore ineligible for execution. On May 20, the judge declined to sign the death warrant for Brown, prompting an angry reaction from family members of the victims. Following the verdict, a Harris County District Attorney's prosecutor announced they would challenge the judge's decision through the Court of Appeals.

On August 17, 2022, the same judge who initially declined to sign the death warrant in May, signed Brown's execution warrant, with the execution date set for March 9, 2023.

The U.S. Supreme Court denied Brown's application for a stay of execution on the afternoon of March 9, 2023. He was executed that same day. In his final statement, he proclaimed his innocence and claimed the state was executing an innocent man.

One of the wounded victims, Rachel Tovar, who had gone to watch both executions, had a statement to make after Brown was executed: "To people that are out there who still have people that have hurt them, don't give up. Fight it, let justice come to you, just like it came to me today."

== See also ==
- Capital punishment in Texas
- Capital punishment in the United States
- List of people executed in Texas, 2000–2009
- List of people executed in Texas, 2020–present
- List of people executed in the United States in 2006
- List of people executed in the United States in 2023

Executions carried out in Texas
Preceded by Shannon Thomas November 16, 2005	Marion Butler Dudley; January 25, 2006	Succeeded by Jaime Elizalde Jr. January 31, 2006
Executions carried out in the United States
Preceded by Perrie Dyon Simpson – North Carolina January 20, 2006	Marion Butler Dudley – Texas; January 25, 2006	Succeeded by Marvin Bieghler – Indiana January 27, 2006
Executions carried out in Texas
Preceded by Gary Green March 7, 2023	Arthur Brown Jr. March 9, 2023	Succeeded by Jedidiah Isaac Murphy October 10, 2023
Executions carried out in the United States
Preceded by Gary Green – Texas March 7, 2023	Arthur Brown Jr. – Texas; March 9, 2023	Succeeded by Louis Bernard Gaskin – Florida April 12, 2023
