= Robert Wesley Knighton =

American serial killer executed in Oklahoma (1941–2003)

- Born: February 5, 1941; Springfield, Missouri, U.S.
- Died: May 27, 2003 (aged 62); Oklahoma State Penitentiary, Oklahoma, U.S.
- Status: Executed by lethal injection
- Convictions: Missouri; Manslaughter; Kidnapping (3 counts); First degree robbery (2 counts); Oklahoma; First degree murder (2 counts); Armed robbery
- Penalty: Missouri; 40 years imprisonment Oklahoma; Death

Details
- Victims: 5
- Span of crimes: September 15, 1973 – January 7, 1990
- Country: United States
- States: Missouri, Oklahoma

Lawrence Lingle Brittain
- Brittain in 2005
- Born: September 11, 1972 (age 54); Clinton, Missouri, U.S.
- Status: Paroled
- Convictions: First degree murder (2 counts); Auto theft
- Penalty: Life imprisonment

Details
- Victims: 2 (as an accomplice)
- Span of crimes: January 6 – January 9, 1990
- Country: United States
- States: Missouri, Oklahoma

Ruth Renee Williams
- Williams in 1990
- Born: February 1967 (age 59); Missouri, U.S.
- Status: Released
- Conviction: Accessory after the fact to first degree murder (2 counts)
- Penalty: 15 years imprisonment

Details
- Span of crimes: January 6 – January 9, 1990
- Country: United States
- States: Missouri, Oklahoma

Robert Wesley Knighton (February 5, 1941 – May 27, 2003) was an American serial killer and spree killer who, after serving time for kidnapping and manslaughter in Missouri, embarked on a four-day, two-state killing spree along with Lawrence Lingle Brittain (born September 11, 1972) and Ruth Renee Williams (born February 1967). Brittain and Williams both pleaded guilty and testified against Knighton in exchange for leniency, and have since been released from prison. Knighton was convicted of two murders in Oklahoma and executed in 2003.

== Early life ==
Knighton, who was nicknamed "Bobby" as a child, did not like to talk about his upbringing, but some details are known. He was born in Springfield, Missouri, to a woman who had eight husbands and many boyfriends. Knighton said he could not recall wanting to be anything in life. He said he idolized Elvis Presley and dreamed of becoming a singer at one point. Knighton was emotionally and physically abused as a child. When he was about 6 years old, he was forced to sit outside during a Thanksgiving dinner at his grandparents' house for looking too much like his father.

One of Knighton's mother's boyfriends hit him hard enough that he was sent to the hospital. Another destroyed his favorite toy. Knighton, who only stayed in school through the fourth grade, ended up in a boy's reformatory when he was 12, where he said that boys were punished for misbehavior with beatings and were placed in a cellar for days at a time.

In 1968, Knighton was convicted of armed robbery in Oklahoma and sentenced to 10 years in prison.

Brittain was born in Clinton, Missouri, and dropped out of school in 8th grade. At the time of the murders, he was on probation for auto theft.

== First murder ==
On September 15, 1973, Knighton, who had been released from prison days ago and was now wanted on assault charges for an incident in which a man was stabbed and a woman was non-fatally strangled with a telephone cord, shot Claude Day, 53, and his son, 32-year-old Coffier Day, with a pistol after Knighton and Coffier had an argument. Claude was shot in the neck and survived, but Coffier was fatally wounded. Immediately following the shootings, Knighton went to the home of a young couple and kidnapped them and their 6-year-old daughter, threatening to kill the girl if they did not comply. During the kidnapping, the man was forced to drink beer and vodka. The kidnapping, which lasted 11 hours, came to an end after Knighton stopped at a café to buy the family food. The woman, fearing her family would be killed, attacked Knighton with a steak knife, cutting his face. Knighton was arrested shortly afterward, and the woman would later testify at the sentencing phase of Knighton's murder trial.

Knighton was convicted of three counts of kidnapping and sentenced to 30 years in prison. He was charged with first degree murder for killing Coffier Day, but pleaded guilty to manslaughter and had 10 years added to his sentence. Knighton also pleaded guilty to first degree robbery and received a concurrent 10-year sentence. He was sent to the Missouri State Penitentiary. While in prison, he joined a white supremacist gang and got several Swastika tattoos as well as a "White Power" tattoo.

== 1990 killing spree ==
In 1989, Knighton was sent to a halfway house in Kansas City, Missouri. While he was there, he started a romantic relationship with a 22-year-old woman named Ruth Renee Williams, who was in a program for drug addicts, and a 17-year-old boy named Lawrence Lingle Brittain. In 1990, after learning that Brittain would be moved to a more restrictive jail setting, they and Williams decided to flee the city. Knighton told Brittain, according to testimony, that they would be committing robberies and possibly murders. Knighton stole a van in which the trio made their getaway. The three intended to flee to either California or Florida.

The day after their escape, the three drove to the home of Knighton's mother, who gave them money. The following day, they drove to the home of Frank Merrifield, a friend of Brittain's father, in Clinton, Missouri. Merrifield was inside with his stepson, Ray Donahue. Merrifield showed Knighton a pistol and invited him to test it. Knighton then fatally shot Merrifield and Donahue and stole their guns and money.

After the murders, the trio drove south to Oklahoma. After Knighton became concerned that they had driven the stolen van too long, the two tried to steal another vehicle, but failed. They kept driving west, searching for an isolated home in which Knighton said they would kill the residents and take what they wanted. As the three drove through rural Oklahoma, Knighton told Brittain he would perform the next robbery since he needed to "grow up". Brittain and Williams started observing homes as they drove. They paused at one home but rejected it when they thought they saw a child in the yard. The "child" was actually a short woman and the toys were wooden decorations.

The two eventually went to the home of 62-year-old Richard and 64-year-old Virginia Denny. Brittain got out of the van and asked Richard for directions, intending to pull a gun on him when he was distracted. However, he lost his nerve and froze. Knighton intervened and held a revolver to the back of Richard's head. He marched him inside, where Virginia was sitting in the kitchen.

Virginia offered Knighton and Brittain some milk but they wanted beer instead. Richard attempted to bargain with Knighton, saying they did not have to die, and that Knighton could take whatever he wanted. Richard said he did not have a phone, so the trio would not have to worry about him calling the police. Knighton said he did not "want to have to" kill the Denny's, but then offered Brittain the chance to shoot the couple. When Brittain declined, Knighton shot the couple execution-style as they were begging for their lives. He later told Williams that at least Virginia had enough time to pray. The trio also stole $61, a pocketknife, and some cigarettes.

The trio stole the keys to the Denny's truck and drove to Canadian, Texas. Knighton decided they needed another car, and the trio searched for another home to break into. A local woman became suspicious of the trio after they repeatedly circled around the block and called the police. They were arrested and the murders were discovered shortly after.

== Trial ==
Knighton, Brittain, and Williams were each charged with two counts of first degree murder in Missouri and Oklahoma. During a preliminary hearing, Brittain, who the court ruled would be tried as an adult, said he and Williams were stupid for having ever agreed to accompany Knighton. Brittain and Williams discussed their hope that Knighton would be willing to take most of the blame for the murders since he was the ringleader.

While in jail awaiting trial, Knighton, a confessed member of the Aryan Brotherhood punched a Native American man who was placed in his cell, and threatened to kill him if the man was returned to his cell. Knighton later admitted to having assaulted black inmates in prison.

In exchange for leniency, Brittain and Williams agreed to testify against Knighton. Brittain pleaded guilty to two counts of first degree murder and Williams pleaded guilty to two counts of being an accessory to murder after the fact. Brittain received two concurrent life terms with parole eligibility and Williams received two concurrent 15-year sentences.

Prosecutors sought a death sentence for Knighton. His lawyer had planned to try blaming either Brittain or Williams for the murders on the grounds that they had to advance themselves in the ranks of Knighton's white supremacist gang. However, Knighton admitted responsibility for the murders saying, "I know they're going to kill me over this deal. I just don't want the kids to take the heat for it."

Knighton was convicted of two counts of first degree murder in 50 minutes, and was sentenced to death after four hours of deliberations.

== Knighton's execution and aftermath ==
Knighton was executed by lethal injection at the Oklahoma State Penitentiary on May 27, 2003. His last meal consisted of a large pepperoni pizza, a strawberry milkshake, a large order of onion rings, and banana cream pie.

Knighton befriended Sue Norton, the adopted daughter of one of his victims, while he was on death row. Norton testified on Knighton's behalf at a clemency hearing, asking the state pardon and parole board for mercy. The request was unanimously denied. Norton's forgiving nature temporarily estranged from her sister, who thought Knighton deserved to die. In Knighton's final statement, which was barely audible, he thanked his attorneys and apologized. He then spoke to Sue Norton, saying" I'll see you again someday. God bless you," he said. She replied with a thumbs-up.

Williams was paroled shortly before Knighton's execution. Brittain was paroled on August 10, 2007.

== See also ==
- Capital punishment in Oklahoma
- List of people executed in Oklahoma
- List of people executed in the United States in 2003
- List of serial killers in the United States
