= Christopher Black Sr. =

Executed American murderer (1959–2003)

- Born: August 2, 1959; Portsmouth, Virginia, U.S.
- Died: July 9, 2003 (aged 43); Huntsville Unit, Huntsville, Texas, U.S.
- Cause of death: Execution by lethal injection
- Status: Executed
- Motive: Revenge against wife over impending divorce
- Conviction: Capital murder
- Penalty: Death

Details
- Victims: Gwendolyn Black, 36; Christina Marie Black, 15 weeks Katrese Houston, 17 months
- Date: February 7, 1998
- Country: United States
- State: Texas
- Location: Killeen
- Weapon: Pistol

Christopher Black Sr. (August 2, 1959 – July 9, 2003) was an American convicted murderer who killed his wife, daughter, and step-granddaughter in Texas in 1998 after learning that his wife wanted a divorce. Christopher was convicted and sentenced to death that same year, and executed in 2003.

== Early life ==
Christopher joined the U.S. Army when he was younger. He rose to the rank of Sergeant before retiring. In the mid-1990s, Christopher married Gwendolyn Black, a retired Army soldier who became an elementary school teacher. The couple had a daughter together, Christina Marie Black.

== Murders, trial, and execution ==
In 1998, Gwendolyn told Christopher that she wanted a divorce. She had become frustrated after her husband did not do much to help the family and left town to get a job as a security guard. After learning of his wife's plans, Christopher decided he would kill her.

Christopher, who had no criminal record, bought a 9mm semi-automatic pistol after waiting a few days for a background check. He also recorded several cassette tapes, in which he said he was angry over his impending divorce, discussed his plans to kill his wife and anyone else he found with her, and explained how he got a gun. Christopher mailed the tapes to relatives, timing them so they would be received after the fact.

The following day, February 7, 1998, Christopher went to Gwendolyn's house in Killeen and shot her 10 times. Deidre Blackburn, a friend of Gwendolyn, witnessed the shooting and fled. Christopher then shot Christina Marie Black, now 5-months-old, and his 17-month-old step-granddaughter, Katrese Houston, while she was sitting in her high chair. Christina was shot once while Katrese was shot five times in the chest. Christopher then called 911 and confessed to the murders. He told the operator that he ran out of bullets.

When the police arrived, Christopher had dropped his weapon and was holding Christina. "We approached him and he said he wasn't going to put the baby down on the cold ground," said officer Eric Bradley in an interview after the murders. "As I reached up to grab the baby from him, he said, 'I want to kiss my baby.' I said 'go ahead.' As I pulled the baby toward me, the baby's head kind of just rolled to the left. ... The eyes were open, fixed, no pulse, no respiration, no nothing."

Christopher was arrested and charged with murder. To simplify the proceedings against him, he was only tried for killing Katrese. The murder was a capital offense due to her age. At his trial, Christopher claimed that his wife emotionally abused him and physically abused his 10-year-old son. Blackburn testified against him.

In August 1998, Christopher was found guilty of capital murder after just 15 minutes. The jury deliberated another seven hours before sentencing him to death. While on death row, he declined to give any interviews. "My days are long and sad," Christopher wrote on a pen pal site for inmates. "I do not want romance or money, the only thing that I want is a friend."

"I don't recall a case that was any more aggravated or any more vicious in the way the crime was committed and the consequences," said Lon Curtis, an attorney who prosecuted Christopher. "The image of that baby, the little girl, slumped over in her high chair with five rounds in the chest. ... I wish I hadn't been reminded of that."

Christopher was executed by lethal injection at the Huntsville Unit on July 8, 2003. When asked if he had any last words, Christopher said "No". After the execution, Gwendolyn's sister, Mardelouis Hawthorne, said "We still miss our loved ones but we won't be thinking about him."

== See also ==
- Capital punishment in Texas
- List of people executed in Texas, 2000–2009
- List of people executed in the United States in 2003
- Familicide
