= John Michael Hooker =

Executed American serial killer

- Born: October 9, 1953; Oklahoma City, Oklahoma, U.S.
- Died: March 25, 2003 (aged 49); Oklahoma State Penitentiary, Oklahoma, U.S.
- Status: Executed by lethal injection
- Convictions: First degree murder (2 counts); First degree manslaughter Assault and battery with a deadly weapon with intent to kill
- Penalty: Death (1988)

Details
- Victims: 3
- Span of crimes: 1971–1988
- Country: United States
- State: Oklahoma
- Date apprehended: April 5, 1988

John Michael Hooker (October 9, 1953 – March 25, 2003) was an American serial killer who killed his girlfriend and her mother in Oklahoma City, Oklahoma in 1988, after having served time for a manslaughter conviction as a teenager. For the latter crimes, Hooker was convicted, sentenced to death and executed in 2003.

== First killing ==
On February 13, 1971, the 17-year-old Hooker was attending a party at the Hamilton Courts neighborhood when he got into an argument with one of the guests. In the resulting scuffle, he pulled out a gun and opened fire, killing 18-year-old Alta K. Lang and injuring two others, the 20-year-old host Claudia Boyce and 17-year-old Charles Edwards Nathenia. The resulting disturbance was quickly reported to local police, who broke up the party upon arrival and booked four men into custody, including Hooker, on a variety of charges. However, upon conducting a test on Hooker's hands using paraffin wax, authorities were able to determine that he had recently fired a weapon, and subsequently charged him with Lang's murder.

As witnesses were uncooperative with police, who were unable to determine whether this was a targeted shooting or not, the charges were reduced to manslaughter. Hooker was convicted of this charge and served time in prison.

== Release and double murder ==
Sometime after his release, Hooker began a relationship with a woman named Sylvia C. Stokes, with whom he had several children but never officially married. Their relationship proved to be troublesome, as Hooker was physically abusive towards her, forcing Stokes to file a restraining order against him. During the hearings, she pleaded with the judge to keep him away from her, saying that she "[did not] want to be like the others – dead", referring to an unrelated series of murders of women who had also filed restraining orders at the time.

The pair attempted to reconcile on at least one occasion, with Hooker even offering to marry her, but this arrangement did not work out, with Stokes later moving out to live with her mother at an apartment in Providence Apartments. Enraged by this, Hooker decided to kill her, with one friend claiming that he had repeatedly stated his intention to do so. On March 27, 1988, Hooker armed himself with a butcher knife and broke into Stokes' apartment, where he proceeded to stab her to death. Not long after, Stokes' mother, 53-year-old Drusilla Morgan, went to check what was going on, but was herself attacked and stabbed to death as well. With his clothes still visibly bloodied, Hooker calmly left the crime scene and returned to his own apartment.

Approximately nine days later, with the help of witness testimony and examining bloody footprints, authorities arrested Hooker for the double murder. At the time of his arrest, his pants still had patches of blood left on them, and one of the arresting police sergeants would later claim that he showed no remorse for the crime and acted cockily the entire time.

== Trial, imprisonment and execution ==
Due to the overwhelming amount of evidence against him, with his previous convictions being a further aggravating factor, Hooker was found guilty and swiftly sentenced to death. The sentence was met with praise from the victims' family members, all of whom stated before the press that he should be executed. Hooker himself, who did not testify at the trial, later told prison guards that he expected to be sentenced to death and that he did not remember how he carried out the killings.

Over the years, Hooker repeatedly filed appeals against his death sentence, all of which were rejected by the courts. His guilt briefly came into question in 2001, when the FBI accused forensic chemist Joyce Gilchrist of falsifying evidence in favor of the prosecution, due to which the Attorney General's Office was ordered to re-examine the cases of three death row inmates; one of them being Hooker. DNA tests conducted on his bloodstained pants proved that he was indeed the killer, pointing out that his blood type group, O, was present on the victims' bodies, both of whom were Type B.

After having his final appeals, a stay of execution and a habeas corpus denied by the Supreme Court, Hooker was executed via lethal injection at the Oklahoma State Penitentiary in McAlester on March 25, 2003. After consulting with his spiritual advisor, Hooker readied himself on the gurney and smiled at the witnesses, informing them that he was at peace. His final words were "Y'all stay up. I'm out."

Gilchrist would later be dismissed from her position due to "flawed casework analysis" and "laboratory mismanagement". She denied any wrongdoing until her death in 2015, claiming that the true reason for her dismissal was a complaint for sexual assault against her supervisor.

== See also ==
- Capital punishment in Oklahoma
- List of people executed by lethal injection
- List of people executed in Oklahoma
- List of people executed in the United States in 2003
- List of serial killers in the United States
