= Robert Dale Rowell =

American convicted murderer (1955–2005)

- Born: April 8, 1955; Houston, Texas, U.S.
- Died: November 15, 2005 (aged 50); Huntsville Unit, Huntsville, Texas, U.S.
- Cause of death: Execution by lethal injection

Robert Dale Rowell (April 8, 1955 – November 15, 2005) was a murderer executed by lethal injection by the U.S. state of Texas. He was convicted of the May 10, 1993, murder of Raymond Davey Mata in a Houston, Texas crack house.

== Crime ==
Rowell had gone to the house on May 10 with the intent to rob Irving Wright of his drugs and money after Rowell thought he had paid too much for some crack cocaine. Wright, Mata and his girlfriend, Angie Perez, were in the house. After entering the house, Rowell told Perez and Mata that he would shoot them if they tried to leave. Rowell then proceeded to beat Wright with a claw hammer. Then the three victims were ordered into the bathtub, where Rowell shot them with a .22 caliber pistol, killing Mata. Wright was in a coma for several months and later died. According to the police report, Mata appeared to have shown signs of being beaten after being shot.

Police arrested Rowell who was parked across the street from the scene and found him in possession of a .22 caliber revolver with six spent cartridge casings in the chamber, the gun case and Wright's bank bag.

== Trial and appeals ==
After being indicted for capital murder on March 1, 1994, he was found guilty and sentenced to death by a jury on April 7. The conviction and sentence were affirmed by the Texas Court of Criminal Appeals on December 18, 1996. A petition for writ of certiorari was denied by the Supreme Court of the United States on October 6, 1997, and further appeals for writ of habeas corpus were denied by his trial court and Texas Court of Criminal Appeals in 1998 and 2002 respectively.

Rowell had appealed his sentence as he claimed the jury were improperly instructed. Under Texas state law, during the sentencing phase of the trial, the jury are asked two special issue questions, one of which relates to the future dangerousness to society of the accused. The jury had asked for clarification of the term "society" and the trial judge had replied, "I am prohibited by law from expanding on the Court's charge." Rowell also said that the judge had not explained properly to the jury just how long the non-parole period of his life sentence would have been. He would not have been released until he was 84 years old.

Prior to the events of May 10, 1993, Rowell already had a criminal record. In 1973 he had served concurrent sentences of ten and twelve years for armed robberies. While on parole in 1980 he had robbed a restaurant at gunpoint. One of the patrons was a police officer, who took chase. After the man had identified himself as a police officer, Rowell had fired at the officer. After being arrested in a parking lot nearby, he was sentenced on November 18, 1980, to 30 years. During this prison sentence he fatally stabbed another inmate with a homemade knife at Ramsey I prison in Brazoria County and was convicted of manslaughter and sentenced to eight years in prison.

According to a psychological testing, Rowell was reported to be unusual for a capital defendant as he did not act impulsively. Instead, he scored highly in ability to think rationally and act purposefully. He was also reported to be suffering from depression, psychopathic behavior, deviant behavior, anxiety, social introversion, drug addiction and alcoholism.

== Execution ==
Rowell declined a last meal, asking for only a cup of tea.

Witnesses to the execution said that he snorted twice as the drugs took effect. He was pronounced dead at 6:24 p.m. CST after being executed by lethal injection at the Huntsville Unit, Huntsville, Texas. He is buried at Captain Joe Byrd Cemetery.

== See also ==
- Capital punishment in Texas
- Capital punishment in the United States
- List of people executed in Texas, 2000–2009
- List of people executed in the United States in 2005

== General references ==
- Offender information from the Texas Department of Criminal Justice
- Report from the National Coalition to Abolish the Death Penalty
- Media Advisory from Texas Attorney General
- "Killer in Houston shootings to be executed". Associated Press. November 14, 2005. Archived from the original on 4 August 2011.
- "Killer in Houston crack house shooting executed". Associated Press. November 15, 2005. Archived from the original on 2011-05-22.
- "Killer apologizes before execution for '93 shooting". Houston Chronicle. November 15, 2005.
