= Asbury Respus =

American serial killer

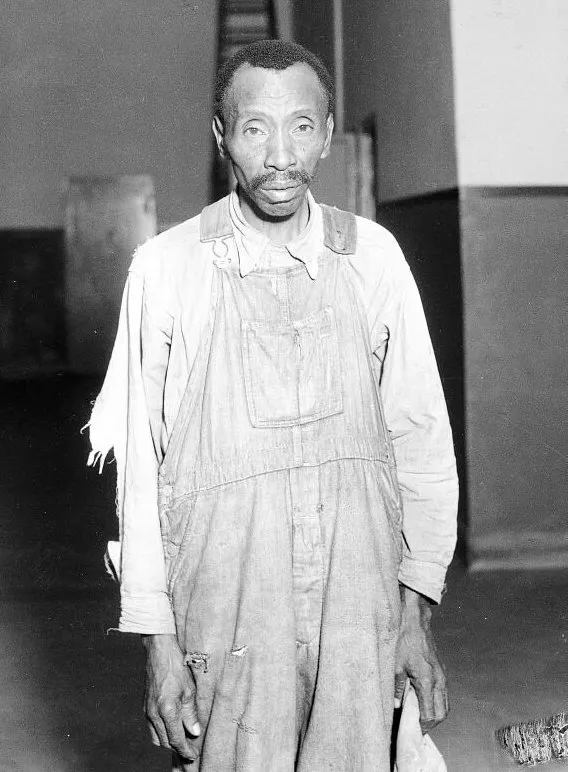
- Asbury Respus, alias Will Moore, after his arrest for the murder of Vera Leonard, September 30, 1931
- Born: c. 1878; North Carolina, U.S.
- Died: January 8, 1932 (aged 53–54); Central Prison, North Carolina, U.S.
- Other names: Asbury Respass; Respass Asbury; Will Moore
- Status: Executed by electrocution
- Convictions: Second degree murder (Ed Wynne murder); First degree murder (Vera Leonard murder)
- Penalty: 15 years imprisonment (Ed Wynne murder); Death (Vera Leonard murder)

Details
- Victims: 8+
- Span of crimes: 1910–1931
- Country: United States
- States: Virginia and North Carolina
- Date apprehended: 1931

Asbury Respus (c. 1878 – January 8, 1932) was an American serial killer who confessed to at least eight murders throughout North Carolina and Virginia in the early 20th century. Respus was not a suspect in most of the murders he committed until he gave a lengthy confession during his trial for the murder of 9-year-old Vera Leonard, the murder for which he would be executed. Respus's victim profile was particularly unique in that his victims were not of a particular age or racial group, as four were white, four were black, two were children, and one was over 80 years old. Respus was executed in the electric chair at the Central Prison in Raleigh in 1932.

== Early life ==
Asbury Respus was born in approximately 1878 to Miles and Ellen Respus. In the region of eastern North Carolina from which Respus hailed, the surname Respass was an alternate but far more commonly found spelling of Respus's last name, leading some local newspapers to speculate that his real name may have been Asbury Respass instead.

Respus claimed that in his youth, he fell off of a barn and injured his head, an incident that he seemed to blame for the violent behavior he exhibited in his adulthood. The incident left him with an indentation in his skull, as well as lifelong mental issues. On June 28, 1900, he married Ophelia Harrell, the daughter of Mr. and Mrs. Daniel Harrell, in Northampton County, North Carolina. Like Respus, she was 22 years old at the time of the marriage.

== First murders and institutionalization ==
In an interview Respus gave in the Central Prison warden H.H. Honeycutt's office the day before his execution, Respus discussed his criminal record in depth. He told the reporters who were present that although he could only conclusively remember eight of the murders that he committed, "I think I killed nine."

The first murders Respus could recall committing were those of two black women, Lizzie Banks and Zenie Britt; Respus shot Banks and beat Britt to death prior to 1912. Around 1910, Respus also murdered another black woman named Becky Storr in Boykins, Virginia, by beating her with a stick.

In 1912, Respus shot and murdered a black man named Ed B. Wynne, a native of Severn, North Carolina. Respus was later charged with and convicted of second degree murder in Wynne's death and sentenced to 15 years in prison, a sentence he began serving on August 31, 1912. In February 1913, approximately six months into his sentence, officials declared Respus 'criminally insane' and sent him to a state mental hospital. Sometime during his stay at the hospital, authorities deemed Respus mentally sound enough to finish serving his sentence in prison, so he was returned to a prison camp. There, he found employment as a cook. On September 13, 1916, Respus and three other prison cooks – John Pearce, Emmett Smith, and Tom Boylan – escaped from the prison kitchen with a fake key that they made on their own, scaling a wall within the prison. Prison officials discovered the escape within a few minutes, but all four of the inmates were able to evade the bloodhounds that authorities used to attempt to trace them, and all four were able to successfully escape.

The fate of the other escapees is unknown, but Respus was not apprehended or arrested again between his 1916 escape and his 1931 arrest for the murder that would lead to his execution.

== 1918–1931 murders ==
After escaping from the prison, Respus returned to Virginia; soon, he relocated to North Carolina once again. On January 14, 1918, near Greensboro, North Carolina, he resumed killing with the murder of housewife Jennie Gilbreath, who died from burn injuries in a house fire that also destroyed her house while her husband was out of town. The murder of Gilbreath marked the first time Respus murdered a white victim. The fire that destroyed the Gilbreath home was initially considered accidental.

On July 21, 1920, Respus drowned a 4-year-old boy named Robert Neal Osborn. While Osborn's death was also originally believed to be an accident (with his death certificate labeling his death "accidental"), Respus confessed shortly before his execution that he threw Osborn into a stream and "held his head under water," stating, "I held it there with both my feet." Respus later pretended to have discovered the body, but authorities did not suspect foul play in Osborn's death until after Respus was arrested for the September 1931 murder of Vera Leonard.

On July 17, 1925, Respus murdered 82-year-old Eunice Stevenson, a widow who lived alone. Respus broke into her house, beat her to death, and left her body hanging by the neck on the rafters of the house in order to stage the scene to look like a suicide. A man in his 40s with dementia and an intellectual disability initially made a false confession to Stevenson's murder. Like the murder of Osborn, Respus was only considered a suspect in the murders of Gilbreath and Stevenson after his arrest for Vera Leonard's murder years later.

Respus was at one point a suspect in the murder of Robert G. Smith, a native of Sumner, a township in Guilford County, who lived alone. Smith's murder was unsolved at the time of Respus's execution; the perpetrator shot into Smith's isolated house and fatally struck him on a Sunday in January 1929. The murder took place approximately five miles from where Respus lived at the time, and four of Respus's murders took place in Guilford County, but Smith's murder was never conclusively tied to Respus. Locals believed that the same person who murdered Smith may have also been responsible for the similar death of Nellie Jones Ballinger, whose body was discovered with a gunshot wound in her mother's Greensboro home on January 15, 1929.

== Murder of Vera Leonard ==
On September 30, 1931, at approximately 8:00 in the morning, 9-year-old Vera Leonard left her house to catch her school bus when Asbury Respus approached and waylaid her shortly before the bus arrived. While authorities initially believed that Respus's motive was sexual assault, Respus later denied having a sexual motive, claiming instead that he had gotten intoxicated on alcohol and drugs and that the drugs had sent him into a violent frenzy. Respus proceeded to beat Leonard to death. After murdering Leonard, Respus wrapped her body in a blanket and set the family house on fire. At the time of the fire, neither Vera's parents, Mr. and Mrs. Thomas Leonard, nor Vera's 4-year-old brother, were home.

Approximately 10 minutes after the murder took place, passersby saw smoke arising from the Leonard household and approached to find the house in flames. The passersby attempted to rescue possessions from inside of the burning house when they noticed pools of blood, shortly after which Vera's father, Thomas Leonard, arrived at the house. After authorities put out the fire, they searched the house and found Vera Leonard's body under a bed. Her skull had been crushed.

Authorities quickly connected Respus to the murder when he repeatedly showed up near the scene of the crime and suspiciously stood around. He was arrested and brought into custody later on September 30, and when police searched his house, they found bloodstained overalls and shoes that matched footprints discovered at the murder scene. At the time of the murder, Respus went by the alias Will Moore, and he was employed as a farmhand in a field located next to the Leonard household.

After questioning Respus for some time, authorities locked Respus in a padded cell. Respus denied any involvement in the crime until authorities confronted him with a pair of bloodstained overalls found in his house. Respus admitted to beating Leonard to death with a stick, stating that he had consumed copious amounts of alcohol the previous day and that "the [devil] must have gotten hold of me."

A lynch mob of approximately 1,000 vigilantes formed on the Guilford County courthouse lawn, but early on the morning of October 2, authorities moved Respus to the Central Prison in Raleigh for safeguarding from mob violence. Around the time of Respus's arrest, two other young black men were arrested for purported involvement in Leonard's death in spite of police admitting that they had little evidence to implicate the two. The young men were taken to a jail in Winston-Salem, North Carolina, for their own protection from lynch mob violence, but after Respus's confession, the young men were released.

== Trial ==
On Monday, October 26, 1931, Respus was arraigned on charges of murder, criminal assault, and arson, all three of which were capital offenses in North Carolina at the time. Respus had two court-appointed attorneys who focused their defense on questioning Respus's sanity at the time of the crime. Prior to the trial, psychiatrists analyzed Respus's mental state. As mob violence was still a threat even with Respus's trial soon to begin, state officials ordered National Guardsmen to protect the courthouse. Authorities expected there to be lynch mob violence if the trial court failed to sentence Respus to death. Between the time of his arraignment and the time his trial began, Respus was held in an undisclosed location for his safekeeping.

Respus's trial was slated for October 28, 1931. Although he was arraigned on three capital charges, the prosecutor elected to try Respus only for the murder of Vera Leonard. During the trial, approximately 60 National Guardsmen stood duty outside of the courthouse. Respus's jury consisted of citizens of Forsyth County, North Carolina, rather than those from Guilford County, where the murder had taken place. Two of Respus's coworkers undermined his insanity defense by stating that they had never witnessed Respus having a mental health episode or acting strangely in the decade in which they had known him; additionally, a mental health expert who had examined Respus's mental state four times since his arrest stated that he believed Respus to be sane. Respus's trial lasted for one day, and the jury took less than one hour to deliberate before convicting him of murder. Judge Thomas J. Shaw sentenced Respus to death in the electric chair and scheduled the execution for January 8, 1932.

The first time Respus was seriously considered a suspect in any murders prior to that of Vera Leonard was during his trial, while he underwent questioning by a group consisting of his attorneys, some psychiatrists, and some county officials. During a noon recess of the court, Respus mentioned having committed two murders in Guilford County and four more in Northampton County. The additional confessions were only reported in the news after Respus's trial for the murder of Vera Leonard concluded with his guilty verdict and death sentence.

== Execution ==
Respus's only attempt to avoid execution was a plea for executive clemency from North Carolina's governor at the time, which was summarily denied. On January 6, two days before the execution, one of Respus's death row attorneys, Tyre C. Taylor, announced that he would not have a board of psychiatrists examine Respus's mental state, thereby permitting his client's execution to move forward without any further legal challenges. Respus expressed satisfaction with his fate, however, telling guards as they delivered his last meal of sardines and crackers, "If Governor Gardner was to free me today, I would tell him I would rather die in the electric chair." Respus also said, "I'd rather be dead and in Heaven than here on earth being tormented to death."

On January 8, 1932, at 10:30 a.m., Respus was executed by electric chair at the Central Prison in Raleigh. Witnesses to his execution included Guilford County Deputy Sheriff Murray Benbow, and S.C. Deskins, the principal of the school that Vera Leonard had attended when she was murdered. Respus was reported to have been singing a hymn shortly before his execution was carried out. Following his execution, nobody stepped forward to claim his body, and his body lay in a local morgue.

== Victim profile and analysis ==
Respus's victim profile was unusual for a serial killer, as his victims were of no particular age or racial group. He confessed to the murders of four black people and four white people; two of the white people (Robert Neal Osborn and Vera Leonard) were children, while at least one of the white victims (Eunice Stevenson) was in her 80s at the time of her death. In addition, Respus's first four murder victims (Lizzie Banks, Zenie Britt, Becky Storr, and Ed Wynn) were all black; his subsequent four victims (Osborn, Leonard, Stevenson, and Jennie Gilbreath) were white. During the interview on the eve of his execution, Respus stated that he committed seven of the murders – all but that of Vera Leonard – while he was "in a spell." He further explained, "When I had them spells, I went funny in the head. I wanted to kill somebody. I wouldn't know why. I just wanted to kill. I'd run. If you ever [saw] a dog with running fits, that's like me when I was in a spell. I'd kill and run." He blamed the murder of Vera Leonard on him having been heavily intoxicated on drugs.

The author of an opinion piece for the Statesville Record & Landmark published after Respus's execution posited that Respus may have inflated the amount of murders he confessed to having committed and that Respus had mental impairments: "Frankly we believe the story was much exaggerated. It is also the opinion, whether the story is or is not true, that [Respus] was probably a mental defective."

== See also ==
- List of serial killers in the United States
- List of people executed in North Carolina
- Capital punishment in North Carolina
