= Elias Syriani =

Palestinian-American murderer (1938–2005)

- الياس حنا سرياني ܐܠܝܐ ܚܢܢܐ ܣܪܝܝܐ
- Undated NCDAC mugshot of Syriani
- Born: Elias Hanna Syriani; 7 January 1938; Jerusalem, Mandatory Palestine
- Died: 18 November 2005 (aged 67); Central Prison, North Carolina, U.S.
- Occupations: Soldier (former), machinist and singer
- Spouse(s): Teresa Syriani (c. 1970s–1990; her death)
- Children: 4
- Status: Executed by lethal injection
- Motive: Domestic violence
- Conviction: First degree murder
- Penalty: Death
- Military career
- Allegiance: Jordan
- Branch: Jordanian Armed Forces; Royal Jordanian Army
- Service years: c. Nine years

Elias Hanna Syriani (Note: Arabic: الياس حنا سرياني, romanized: Ilyās Ḥannā Suryānī) (Note: Syriac: ܐܠܝܐ ܚܢܢܐ ܣܪܝܝܐ, romanized: Ēlyā Ḥannā Suryā) (7 January 1938 – 18 November 2005) was a Palestinian immigrant to the United States, a former Jordanian soldier, and a convicted murderer, who was executed by the U.S. state of North Carolina by lethal injection. He was convicted of the 28 July 1990 murder of his wife, Teresa Yousef Syriani, in Charlotte. At 67, he was one of the oldest people executed in the United States since 1976.

== Youth and marriage ==
Syriani was born in Jerusalem, which at the time was part of the British Mandate of Palestine, into an Assyrian Christian family. When he was 12, his father was imprisoned by the at-the-time new nation of Israel, causing him to have a mental breakdown and become unstable, as well as later developing cancer. This forced Syriani, the eldest son, to leave school and go to work. The family moved to Amman, Jordan, where Syriani joined the Jordanian Armed Forces under the Jordanian Army for nine years. After his military service, he left and worked as a machinist for a company in Jordan, as well as for a radio station, singing in Arabic. In the mid-1970s, he decided that he had become financially able to marry. He met Teresa through a mutual friend. She had emigrated to the United States and they exchanged letters and photographs for about three months. She returned to Jordan only two or three weeks before the wedding.

They then moved to the United States together, living in Chicago, Illinois, where Teresa lived and dressed according to Middle Eastern tradition. But after moving in 1986 to Charlotte, North Carolina, she took a job at a gas station, dressed in a more American fashion and made friends. Syriani disapproved and the two argued over it.

== Crime ==
In 1990, Teresa had filed to divorce Syriani and received a protective order from a North Carolina court, requiring that Syriani move out of their home and stay away from her and their four children. Around 11:20 p.m., on 28 July 1990, Syriani drove to Teresa's house and found that Teresa was absent. He then waited in her driveway. When she returned from work, he blocked her access with his van. After getting out of his van, he went over to her car, where through an open window, he stabbed Teresa 28 times with a screwdriver, with their 10-year-old son, John, in the passenger seat. John tried to stop his father but was unable to.

John ran from the car and summoned help from his older sister, Rose. He then went to a friend's house and on returning, they found Syriani still in the car and still stabbing Teresa. She was still alive after Syriani stopped his attack, got into his van and left. He drove to a nearby fire station to receive medical attention for cuts and scratches. A fireman later testified in court that Syriani told him that Teresa had assaulted him. The police arrived shortly afterwards and arrested him.

Teresa survived for 28 days before succumbing to a 3-inch (8-cm) deep wound in her brain. One neighbour who saw her in the car said that it looked like she had been shot in the face with buckshot pellets.

Syriani gave a different version of events, testifying at his trial that he did not block Teresa's path, nor did he intend to hurt or kill her that night. He said that she scratched at his face when he approached the car, and then slammed the car door open onto his leg. He claims to only remember striking her three or four times with the screwdriver. The screwdriver that Syriani had used was also never found.

== Trial and appeals ==
Before Teresa's death, Syriani was charged with assault with a deadly weapon with intent to kill. This charge was changed to capital murder after her death. On 12 June 1991 he was sentenced to death at the Mecklenburg County Superior Court, with the jury finding as an aggravating factor the crime being especially heinous, atrocious, or cruel. This outweighed the eight mitigating circumstances that they also found.

Syriani testified that his wife had hit him almost every day in front of their children and had called the police about him several times. He did admit to hitting her three or four times during their first five years of marriage. The children contradicted him, saying that the marriage was full of instances of domestic violence from both sides. Their middle daughter, Sara, testified in the penalty phase of the trial, that during one argument, Syriani chased Teresa with a pair of scissors. In another instance, Teresa claimed that Syriani back-handed her while they were in the car and one time threw her down the stairs by her hair. John said that another time, his father threatened Teresa with a bat.

Syriani petitioned for a writ of habeas corpus, arguing that his trial counsel was ineffective and denied him a fair trial. He expressed that he was under fear of losing his children during the crime, claiming a diagnosis of PTSD from psychologists. He also gave evidence of his good behavior while incarcerated. His children said they had forgiven their father and asked that his sentence be commuted. An appeal to the Supreme Court of the United States was denied in October 2005 and the execution date was subsequently set for 18 November 2005.

An appeal for clemency was denied by the at-the-time North Carolinian Governor, Mike Easley on 17 November 2005, a day before Syriani's scheduled execution.

== Execution ==
On 18 November 2005, Syriani was to be executed by lethal injection in Central Prison. None of his children witnessed the execution, though they did meet him the previous day, leaving at about 11 p.m.. Despite this, two of Syriani's friends, detectives who worked on his case, and media reporters were present as witnesses. After Syriani was wheeled into the execution chamber on a gurney, he was hooked up to an IV line at 2 a.m.. Syriani was pronounced dead at 2:12 a.m., after being injected by three unidentified executioners.

In his final statement, he said:

I want to thank God first for everything that happened in my life. I want to thank my children. I want to thank my family, especially my sister, Odeet. I want to thank all the beautiful friends who share with me my sufferings [sic] for 15 years and four months and they so encouraged me, specifically Mr. and Mrs. Meg Eggleston who become [sic] a sister to me. She helped me a lot to accept everything. I thank everyone from the staff, nurses, chaplains. [sic] I thank everyone.

At 67, he was one of the oldest people executed in the United States since 1976 and was the 997th person executed since the Gregg v. Georgia decision.

== See also ==
- Capital punishment in North Carolina
- Capital punishment in the United States
- List of people executed in North Carolina
- List of people executed in the United States in 2005
