= John R. Hicks =

American murderer executed by the U.S. state of Ohio

- Mugshot of Hicks
- Born: July 31, 1956; Cincinnati, Ohio, U.S.
- Died: November 29, 2005 (aged 49); Southern Ohio Correctional Facility, Ohio, U.S.
- Status: Executed by lethal injection
- Convictions: Aggravated murder, robbery
- Penalty: Death

John R. Hicks (July 31, 1956 – November 29, 2005) was an American murderer executed by the U.S. state of Ohio. He was executed for the August 2, 1985, murder of his 5-year-old stepdaughter, Brandy Green. He was also convicted of the murder of his 56-year-old mother-in-law, Maxine Armstrong, for which he received a life sentence.

== Crime ==
Born in Cincinnati, Ohio, Hicks was a cocaine addict and alcoholic. He had purchased cocaine around 4 p.m. on August 2, 1985, but felt a further craving, so he took the VCR from his own home as security for a $50 purchase. He did not have the cash to redeem the VCR, so he knew his wife would become angry when she found out what he had done. He then decided to rob and murder Armstrong.

He telephoned Armstrong to say he was coming home. When he arrived around 11 p.m., he put his stepdaughter to bed. He then approached Armstrong from behind and strangled her with his own hands. To make sure she was dead, he used a length of clothesline. He searched her bedroom and stole $300 and some credit cards.

After buying more cocaine, he realized his stepdaughter would place him at the crime scene and could be a potential witness. He returned and smothered her with a pillow. When this failed to kill his stepdaughter, he tried to use his own hands and then duct taped her mouth and nose. He attempted to dismember Armstrong in the bathtub but gave up after nearly cutting one of her legs off. Returning to the body of Brandy Green, he removed her panties and penetrated her with his finger. His last plans in the apartment were to steal a checkbook, a ring, a .32 caliber pistol, and an ammunition box. After returning to his apartment around 3 a.m., he fled Cincinnati at 6 a.m. He was arrested two days later in Knoxville, Tennessee on August 4, 1985.

== Trial and appeals ==
Hicks was convicted of the aggravated murder of Maxine Armstrong while committing robbery, for which he received a life sentence to be served concurrently with a 10 to 25-year sentence for aggravated robbery. In the murder of his 5-year-old stepdaughter, Hicks was convicted of aggravated murder to escape detention and the purposeful killing of more than two people.

Hicks was sentenced to death on March 3, 1986, for the aggravated murder of Brandy Green.

Hicks's lawyers have argued that under Ohio law, voluntary intoxication may be considered a mitigating factor in capital cases. They say that the jury was not instructed of this fact. In their report, the parole board wrote that although he was intoxicated, the "merciless death" of his stepdaughter was premeditated.

The jury was also told that the final decision of whether to impose a death sentence rested with the trial judge. They say that this may have led some jurors to vote for the death penalty, even though they had doubts about its appropriateness for the case. The Court of Appeals of Ohio overturned the later grounds for appeal. They stated that they did not endorse "the perpetuation of a practice that has fallen into disfavor in this state."

Dr. Theodore Parran of the Case Western School of Medicine diagnosed Hicks with a psychotic decomposition and recommended that he be placed into a psychiatric facility for observation. Parran said that although Hicks' actions appeared deliberate, he did not know what he was doing.

The nine-member Ohio Parole Board recommended unanimously on November 15, 2005, that Governor Bob Taft deny clemency for Hicks. At the hearing, his brother pleaded for Hicks' life to be spared, while his sister-in-law argued that Hicks should be executed for his crimes.

== Execution ==
John Hicks died by lethal injection at 10:20 a.m. on November 29, 2005, at the Southern Ohio Correctional Facility in Lucasville, Ohio.

Asked for a final statement by the warden, he said:

It begun with a syringe in my arm and it ends with a needle in my arm. It's come full circle. I realize that. … I know this may be shallow or hollow words to y'all but it's coming from my heart.

After the drugs had begun to flow, he said, "Whoa. Hallelujah", laughed loudly, and said, "Yes. Thank you."

== See also ==
- Capital punishment in Ohio
- Capital punishment in the United States
- List of people executed in Ohio
- List of people executed in the United States in 2005

== General references ==
- Report from the National Coalition to Abolish the Death Penalty
- Ohio Parole Board clemency report (PDF)
- "Board upholds execution for stepdaughter's killer". The Cincinnati Enquirer. November 16, 2005.
- "Brother pleads for killer's life". The Cincinnati Enquirer. November 9, 2005.
- "Ohio executes John Hicks". Associated Press. November 29, 2005.

Executions carried out in Ohio
Preceded by Willie Williams October 25, 2005	John R. Hicks; November 29, 2005	Succeeded by Glenn Lee Benner II February 7, 2006
Executions carried out in the United States
Preceded by Eric Nance – Arkansas November 28, 2005	John R. Hicks – Ohio; November 29, 2005	Succeeded by Kenneth Boyd – North Carolina December 2, 2005
