= Desmond Keith Carter =

American murderer

- Born: October 15, 1967; Rhode Island, United States
- Died: December 10, 2002 (aged 35); Central Prison, North Carolina, United States
- Status: Executed by lethal injection
- Motive: Robbery to buy cocaine
- Convictions: First-degree murder, robbery with a dangerous weapon
- Penalty: Death (murder), 40 years imprisonment (robbery)

Details
- Victims: Helen Purdy
- Date: March 9, 1992

Desmond Keith Carter (October 15, 1967 – December 10, 2002) was convicted of the 1992 murder of Helen Purdy and executed in 2002 by the state of North Carolina at the Central Prison in Raleigh.

Carter was born in the state of Rhode Island and lived with his maternal grandmother since his mother moved away when Carter was 3. Eventually, he moved with his paternal grandmother to North Carolina.

Carter started using drugs as a teenager and on March 9, 1992, under the influence of alcohol, crack cocaine, and tranquilizers, killed his 71-year-old neighbor, Helen Purdy, by stabbing her 13 times with a butcher knife, and robbed her of $15 (equivalent to $34 in 2025) in order to buy cocaine. Purdy was found in her home in a pool of blood on her living room floor, where her purse was found open that Purdy placed by the telephone. Not long before Carter committed this crime, his grandmother had tried to get substance abuse and mental health treatment for him; the hospital refused because he did not have medical insurance coverage.

In July 1993, Carter was sentenced to death for first degree murder and to 40 years imprisonment for robbery with a dangerous weapon. On the eve of his execution, Carter declined a special meal. He bought two cheeseburgers, a steak sub, and two Coca-Colas from the prison canteen, for which he paid $4.20 from his prison account. He was executed by means of lethal injection on December 10, 2002.

Carter mouthed "I love you, pop" to his father before his execution. In a statement that was recorded by the warden of Central Prison, Carter said: "The only thing I would like to say is that I apologize to the victim's family of Ms. Purdy and I would like to apologize to my family for the disappointment and pain I have caused them throughout my life."

== See also ==
- Capital punishment in North Carolina
- Capital punishment in the United States
- List of people executed in North Carolina
- List of people executed in the United States in 2002

== General references ==
- Offender Profile data for offender 0068237. North Carolina Department of Correction (2002-12-10). Retrieved on 2007-08-12.
- Desmond Keith Carter - Chronology of Events. North Carolina Department of Correction (2002-12-10). Retrieved on 2007-08-12.
- Patrick O'Neill. Two families plead for relatives' lives. Independent Weekly (2002-12-04). Retrieved on 2007-08-12.
- Estes Thompson.. The News & Observer (2002-12-10). Archived from the original on 2002-12-21. Retrieved on 2007-08-13.
- Desmond Keith Carter. The Clark County Prosecuting Attorney. Retrieved on 2007-08-12.
- Last Meals on Death Row (2002). Dead Man Eating. Retrieved on 2007-08-12.
- USA (North Carolina): Death penalty/legal concern: Desmond Keith Carter. Amnesty International (2002-11-05). Retrieved on 2007-08-12.
