= Murder of Suzi Holliman =

Suzi Holliman
- Born: Sue Ellen Holliman; June 30, 1968; North Carolina, U.S.
- Died: March 14, 1985 (aged 16); Lexington, North Carolina, U.S.
- Cause of death: Fatal stab wounds
- Other name: Suzi
- Education: Westchester Academy
- Occupation: Student
- Known for: Kidnap and murder victim
- Parent: Lindsey Hugh Holliman (Father)

Sue Ellen "Suzi" Holliman (June 30, 1968 – March 14, 1985) was a North Carolina teenager who was kidnapped from her home and murdered in 1985. Initial investigations led to the arrest of a suspect that provided a false confession. However, Ricky Lee Sanderson, a prisoner who was serving life plus 110 years in prison for rape and attempted murder, confessed to her murder in 1986.

Sanderson was found guilty of murdering Holliman and sentenced to death in 1987. His death sentence was overturned twice before it was reinstated in 1991 and 1995 respectively. Sanderson was executed in the gas chamber on January 30, 1998, after he waived his remaining appeals against the sentence.

== Murder ==
On March 14, 1985, 16-year-old Sue Ellen Holliman, better known as Suzi, disappeared from her family home in Lexington, North Carolina. Holliman was sick and stayed home from school that day, and was last seen by her father, Democratic politician L. Hugh Holliman, at 12:30pm when he came home to check on her during the lunch hour. After about ten to 15 minutes, Holliman's father left home after seeing that his daughter had become better. Later in the afternoon, when Holliman's mother returned home, she noticed that her daughter was missing, and it prompted her to call the police.

An extensive search was conducted to find the missing girl, and many people, including local law enforcement officers, Rescue Squad members and friends of Holliman, participated in the search. Holliman's parents also believed that their daughter did not run away from home. Crime Stoppers, a community program aimed to provide crime-solving assistance, offered a reward of $1,000 for information to ascertain the whereabouts of Holliman.

On April 14, 1985, a month after the disappearance of Holliman, in the east of Lexington, a farmer discovered the body of Holliman in a shallow grave while plowing a nearby field. An autopsy was later conducted on the victim, and the medical examiner certified that the cause of death was a result of three stab wounds on the victim's chest. When the body was discovered, Holliman's underwear and sweat pants were being pulled down partially, and her bra was partially torn, although there was no clear evidence of sexual molestation.

== Investigations and initial arrest ==
After the discovery of Suzi Holliman's body, the police investigations reclassified the case as murder and therefore put up a public appeal seeking information and potential witnesses to assist the authorities to solve the case.

On May 15, 1985, 26-year-old Elwood "Woody" Jones was arrested as a suspect behind the murder. Jones was an employee of a business managed by the victim's family.

On May 16, 1985, Jones was charged with first-degree murder. He reportedly confessed that he went to the house of Holliman on the date of the crime, and therefore implicated himself in this case. Additionally, Jones was taken to the crime scene where the body was found, and he described the killing and admitted to two inmates and an SBI informer that he killed Holliman.

In October 1985, Jones was scheduled to stand trial for the murder of Holliman on March 3, 1986.

== Confession and charges of Ricky Sanderson ==
Prior to Woody Jones' trial for the murder of Suzi Holliman, a private investigator named Charles Tolliver was hired by Jones' family. Tolliver noticed similarities between Holliman's murder to another stabbing case perpetrated by an inmate named Ricky Lee Sanderson. On January 17, 1986, Tolliver visited Sanderson at Central Prison in Raleigh to interview him about the case. Sanderson did not confess to Tolliver, but claimed that the case "weighed heavily on his mind" following the meeting. On January 21, 1986, Sanderson requested to meet with Davidson County law enforcement, to whom he confessed to the homicide of Suzi Holliman. Investigations eventually verified that Sanderson was indeed the perpetrator instead of Jones. On February 21, 1986, Jones was released after the prosecution dismissed the murder charge against him.

At the time of his confession, Sanderson had served two months a life sentence plus 110 years for a kidnapping, assault, and rape of a woman in High Rock Lake on May 16, 1985. He was additionally charged in the April 4, 1986 rape of a woman from South Carolina inside of a motel.

In his confession, Sanderson admitted that of March 14th, 1985, he broke into the Holliman house to steal money to fund his drug habit. He claimed that he chose this home because it was well-concealed due to trees in the yard. After encountering Suzi Holliman, he raped her and abducted her from her home. He then drove with Holliman in the car for two hours. After reaching a rough dirt road, Sanderson locked the victim in the car trunk while he used a shovel to dig a grave. Sanderson recounted that after digging the grave, he choked Holliman and stabbed her in the chest with a knife. He then buried Suzi's corpse, disposed of the murder weapon by throwing it from a bridge, and drove back home.

On March 3, 1986, a Davidson County grand jury formally indicted Sanderson for one count of murder.

== Trials of Sanderson ==
=== Background ===
Ricky Lee Sanderson

Ricky Lee Sanderson was born on February 25, 1959, and raised in severe poverty amidst extreme family dysfunction. He and his siblings moved frequently between their mother in Texas, their father in North Carolina, and foster care, often forced to scavenge for food after their parents separated. The siblings endured horrific abuse: their father physically beat Sanderson and his brother, and repeatedly raped their sister over a six-year period until his arrest and 15-year prison sentence for incest. Amid this tumultuous and traumatic upbringing, Sanderson turned to drug use during his adolescence.

=== Plea of guilt and sentencing ===
On April 7, 1986, Sanderson pleaded guilty to the murder of Suzi Holliman. A sentencing trial was set a month later on May 26, 1986, and the prosecution planned to seek the death penalty. The trial was also moved out of the county to Statesville due to extensive pretrial publicity in the local community.

On May 26, 1986, Sanderson's sentencing trial was held as scheduled, and an Iredell County jury was selected to hear the case. The defense planned to argue before the jury that Sanderson was motivated to confess to prevent Woody Jones from going to prison for a crime he did not commit. The defense also claimed this was motivated by a genuine religious conversion to born-again Christianity; they believed these would be mitigating factors for sentencing. The prosecution, however, planned to proceed with the death penalty on account of the aggravating factors of the case. The jury was set to hear testimonies on May 28, 1986.

On May 30, 1986, Sanderson pleaded guilty and was sentenced to death upon the jury's unanimous recommendation for capital punishment. Judge Walter Allen set an execution date of August 1, 1986, but the date would be stayed pending a mandatory appeal to the North Carolina Supreme Court. Sanderson was additionally sentenced to the maximum of 40 years for the kidnapping charge.

=== Rape trial and sentence ===
Alongside his trial for Suzi Holliman's murder, Sanderson also faced a second trial for the unrelated April 1985 rape of the South Carolina woman. He pleaded not guilty to the rape and burglary charges on March 6, 1986.

On September 9, 1986, Sanderson was sentenced to a second life term after he changed his plea to guilty for the rape charge, in addition to ten years for the burglary charge.

=== First re-sentencing ===
On August 30, 1990, the North Carolina Supreme Court revoked the death sentences of Sanderson and two other prisoners on the basis that they were sentenced to death under a state law that the U.S. Supreme Court deemed unconstitutional. Sanderson was therefore granted a re-sentencing trial, and District Attorney Butch Zimmerman expressed his intent to pursue the death penalty once again for Sanderson.

The re-sentencing trial of Sanderson took place on May 19, 1991, before a second jury. The hearing was delayed at one point due to the defense and prosecution debating whether to let the jury hear about Sanderson's confession to a rape case.

On June 3, 1991, the jury voted to sentence Sanderson to death a second time, and Greensboro Superior Court Judge Joseph John meted out the death sentence in accordance with the jury verdict. An execution date of August 5, 1991, was set for Sanderson, but it would be stayed pending another automatic appeal to the North Carolina Supreme Court.

Before the North Carolina Supreme Court could review his case, on April 19, 1992, Sanderson filed a handwritten petition and sought to forgo his direct appeal against the death sentence, and he stated he wished to be executed rather than continuing to live his life behind bars. Days later, the North Carolina Supreme Court denied Sanderson's request and ordered that his appeal should proceed for hearing in the following year.

=== Second re-sentencing ===
On April 8, 1994, the North Carolina Supreme Court once again overturned Sanderson's death sentence and ordered another re-sentencing trial, on the basis that during the first re-sentencing trial, District Attorney Butch Zimmerman showed improper conduct by attempting to distort the testimony of a psychiatric expert who testified for the defense.

On October 20, 1995, Sanderson's second re-sentencing trial took place at a Iredell County trial court, and a third jury selection phase was underway to choose eligible jurors to decide on his sentence.

On November 4, 1995, the jury once again imposed the death penalty for Sanderson, and Judge Thomas W. Ross formally reinstated the death sentence, and he also scheduled an execution date of January 6, 1996, for Sanderson.

On July 24, 1997, the North Carolina Supreme Court dismissed Sanderson's direct appeal against his third death sentence.

== Execution ==
In August 1997, Ricky Sanderson filed a motion to the Davidson County Superior Court, seeking to waive his remaining rights to appeal against the death sentence, and he once again affirmed he wished to be executed rather than spend the rest of his life in prison.

In early January 1998, Sanderson's death warrant was authorized, and he was scheduled to be executed on January 30, 1998.

Before his execution date, Sanderson was given the option to choose between two methods of execution: the gas chamber or lethal injection. He chose to be executed in the gas chamber, making him the second person from North Carolina to select this method since the nationwide reinstatement of capital punishment in 1976, following David Lawson in 1994.

Nearing the date of Sanderson's scheduled execution, Governor Jim Hunt conducted a review of Sanderson's case to decide whether or not to grant Sanderson clemency and commute his death sentence to life imprisonment. On January 28, 1998, two days before Sanderson's execution date, Governor Hunt denied Sanderson clemency and upheld his death sentence.

On January 30, 1998, 38-year-old Ricky Lee Sanderson was put to death in the gas chamber at Central Prison. He was pronounced dead at 2:19am, about 18 minutes after the cyanide pellets were dropped into the chamber. Prior to his execution, Sanderson declined to request for a last meal, stating his move was to protest abortion and in his own words, the aborted babies did not have a chance for a last meal and he made this decision in their memory. However, he accepted a honey bun before he was taken to the gas chamber. Before inhaling the gas, Sanderson said his last words, "I'm dying for a deed I did, and I deserve death for it, and I'm glad Christ forgave me."

== Aftermath ==
Ricky Sanderson was the second and last person to be executed in North Carolina's gas chamber. In June 1998, three months after the execution of Sanderson, a bill was proposed to abolish the gas chamber and allow the state to only execute criminals with lethal injection; this was later passed and approved by the General Assembly.

In 2010, 12 years after Sanderson's execution, the Suzi Holliman case received renewed attention when the Republican Party distributed a mailer criticizing her father L. Hugh Holliman's support for the newly enacted Racial Justice Act. The law allowed death-row inmates to seek commutation to life without parole if racial bias had influenced their sentencing. When the mailer was distributed to the district where the murder took place, it caused controversy because Holliman had been murdered in 1985, and her father had witnessed Sanderson's execution in 1998. Republican Party Chairman Tom Fetzer later apologized, stating that he had been unaware of the personal connection between Holliman's father and capital punishment.

== See also ==
- Capital punishment in North Carolina
- List of people executed in North Carolina
- List of people executed in the United States in 1998
