= Edward Hartman =

American convicted murderer (1964–2003)

Edward Ernest Hartman (August 25, 1964 – October 3, 2003) was convicted of the 1993 murder of Herman Smith Sr. and was executed via lethal injection in 2003 by the State of North Carolina at Central Prison in Raleigh, North Carolina.

Hartman confessed to the crime but requested a life sentence. According to The News & Observer, five mitigating factors were presented at Hartman's trial, including alcoholism (he claimed to be severely intoxicated at the time of the murder) and childhood abuse. The jury felt that these factors were outweighed by Hartman's theft of Smith's car and money. In seeking clemency, Hartman's lawyers (along with outside groups) argued that the prosecution had used Hartman's sexuality (he was bisexual) in a discriminatory manner, an argument rejected by the courts and by Governor Mike Easley of North Carolina.

== See also ==
- Capital punishment in North Carolina
- Capital punishment in the United States
- List of people executed in North Carolina
- List of people executed in the United States in 2003

== General references ==
- "State executes convicted killer; Governor denies clemency after U.S. Supreme Court declines to hear case of man who killed housemate," by Matthew Eisley. Raleigh News & Observer, October 3, 2003
