= Robbie Lyons =

American murderer (1972–2003)

Robbie James Lyons (July 10, 1972 – December 5, 2003) was convicted of the 1993 murder of Stephen Wilson Stafford and in 2003 was executed at Central Prison in Raleigh, North Carolina.

== Prior arrests ==
A series of arrests and releases in 1993 preceded the murder for which Lyons was later executed. Convicted on 16 April 1993 on multiple charges of larceny and forgery, Lyons was sentenced to 17 months in prison; however, he served only a month of this sentence and was released on 17 May 1993. He was arrested again a month later on charges of armed robbery, for which he received three years probation on a plea bargain; he used an alias, and even though his real name was known, his prior arrest and improper release were overlooked. Finally, four days before the murder of Stephen Stafford, Lyons was arrested a third time for failure to appear in court, for which he was released on a $50 bond.

== Crime ==
The murder of Stephen Wilson Stafford occurred on 25 September 1993, apparently as part of an attempted robbery. Stafford was the owner of a small store in Forsyth County, North Carolina. According to the testimony of Derick Hall, an alleged accomplice who was in the store with Lyons at the time of the murder, Lyons chose to rob the store on the spur of the moment because he was out of money. Hall claimed not to have participated directly in the robbery, but that he heard Lyons fire five shots at Stafford and disappear; Hall turned himself into police custody on the following day. Victoria Lytle, a witness who had just left Stafford's store, also claimed that she heard gunshots and saw Lyons leave the store with a gun in hand shortly afterwards.

=== Trial ===
Following Lyons's conviction on 6 May 1994, allegations arose of poor legal representation; Lyons's trial attorneys put forward no evidence during the trial. Additionally, Lyons's primary attorney was primarily a real estate lawyer and had only met Lyons once before the trial. A psychologist testified during deliberations on Lyons's sentencing that he suffered from bipolar disorder, antisocial personality disorder and had a history of substance abuse from a very early age. Lyons's mother provided an affidavit, which was not presented at trial, testifying that Lyons was the result of an unexpected teenage pregnancy and grew up in a household where he was regularly abused and beaten by his grandmother.

Lyons's extensive and violent criminal history was a factor brought forward by those arguing against clemency. A month prior to his execution, Lyons assaulted a prison guard and prison authorities placed him in solitary confinement for the final days of his incarceration.

After the U.S. Supreme Court denied a petition for a writ of certiorari in Lyons's case on 6 October 2003, the state of North Carolina set an execution date of 5 December 2003. Lyons was set to be the seventh convicted murderer executed by North Carolina that year, making 2003 a peak for executions in the state (exceeded only in recent history by 1949, which saw 10 executions).

=== Execution ===
As was customary, North Carolina governor Mike Easley reviewed pleas for clemency; prior to the execution he met both with Lyons's defense attorneys and members of Stafford's family. Reverend Jesse Jackson also wrote to Mike Easley just prior to Lyons's execution, also pleading for a commutation of the death sentence. Easley declined to commute Lyons's death sentence.

Lyons's last meal prior to his execution was pizza and lasagna, both prepared in accordance with Islamic dietary laws, and a Pepsi. His final words were: "It is from Allah that I come and it is to Allah that I return. If my death brings another person happiness, then I'm happy for them." Lyons was pronounced dead at North Carolina's Central Prison in Raleigh at 2:17 a.m. in the early morning of December 5, 2003. His execution was the 885th carried out in the United States, and the 30th in North Carolina, since the death penalty was reinstated in 1976.

Lyons spent 9 years, 6 months, and 29 days on death row.

== See also ==
- Capital punishment in North Carolina
- Capital punishment in the United States
- List of people executed in North Carolina
- List of people executed in the United States in 2003

== General references ==
- Robbie James Lyons. The Clark County Prosecuting Attorney. Retrieved on 2007-11-13.
- Offender Data Screen. North Carolina Department of Correction. Retrieved on 2007-11-13.
- Robbie James Lyons - Chronology of Events. North Carolina Department of Correction. Retrieved on 2007-11-13.
