= Michael McGay Reeves =

American murderer and suspected serial killer

- Born: July 22, 1962 (age 64); Marion, Virginia, U.S.
- Convictions: North Carolina: First degree murder Assault; Rape; Virginia: Rape x2 Kidnapping; Attempted murder
- Penalty: North Carolina: Death; Virginia: Life imprisonment x2 plus 100 years

Details
- Victims: 1–3
- Span of crimes: February – August 1989
- Country: United States
- States: North Carolina, possibly Virginia
- Date apprehended: October 19, 1989
- Imprisoned at: Central Prison, Raleigh, North Carolina

Michael McGay Reeves (born July 22, 1962) is an American murderer and suspected serial killer who was convicted of murdering a woman in North Carolina in 1989. Sentenced to death for this crime, he was additionally suspected of two similar murders committed in Virginia between February and August 1989, but was never brought to trial for either of them.

== Early life ==
Little is known about Reeves' upbringing. Born on July 22, 1962, in Marion, Virginia, he enlisted in the Marine Corps in the mid-1980s and was transferred to serve in Craven County, North Carolina. In 1986, he held a female Marine at knifepoint and raped her, for which he was later arrested, convicted and subsequently dishonorably discharged from the service.

In March 1988, he was released from prison and moved back to Marion, where he found himself a girlfriend named Lori Woods. In order to support himself, Reeves started worked at a stable in Craven County, North Carolina, where he remained from August 1988 until March 1989.

== Murders ==
On February 6, 1989, Reeves broke into the home of 27-year-old Susan Thomas Toler, who lived at 1855 Hill Neck Road in Ernul, a small city located within Craven County. When he came across her, he slashed her throat with a knife, put a pillow over her face and shot her in the head with a .25 caliber pistol. (Note: In some articles, the caliber was listed as .32.) Toler was discovered later that day and rushed to the Craven Regional Medical Center, but was pronounced dead on arrival.

Approximately two months later, on April 16, a man picking aluminum cans south of Marion found the body of 47-year-old Barbara Jean Hagy near a mountain road. Hagy had gone missing the previous day after leaving her home to attend a party at the Wagon Wheel, a dance hall located at the volunteer fire department. At the time her body was discovered, most of her clothing was missing. Initially, it was suspected that her killing would be related to a triple murder in nearby Tazewell County, but this lead was later abandoned.

On July 6, the body of 47-year-old Betty Ann Shumate was found on a service road off I-81, close to her workplace at the Adwolfe Food Center. She was stabbed several times in the kidney. Approximately a month later, local police arrested her estranged husband Robert and charged with him the murder, holding him on $200,000 bail. The basis for the arrest was that since Shumate was behind on child support payments, he had a reason to harm his wife. This, in addition to a witness description provided by a local which vaguely resembled Robert, led police to initially believe he was responsible.

== Attempted suicide, rapes, and arrest ==
=== Attempted suicide ===
Approximately 45 minutes after Betty Shumate's last recorded sale at the market, Reeves returned to his home and shot himself through the left shoulder in what appeared to be a suicide attempt. Rescue workers were notified of gunshots being fired from the house and were dispatched to it, and after finding Reeves inside, they drove him to the nearest hospital. It was later determined that he had lost relatively little blood, but the strange circumstances of the incident led one of the rescue workers to believe it might be connected to the recent disappearance of Shumate. These concerns were relayed to the local police, but as Shumate's body was not found at the time, the tip was ignored.

=== Rapes ===
On October 13, Reeves raped and attempted to kill a USFS employee working at the Mount Rogers National Recreation Area. The woman was abducted from her office and driven to a remote location in Smyth County, where Reeves raped her. He then cut her throat, stabbed her in the back, and stole a total of $248.

Four days later, Reeves went to a Rodeway Inn in Bristol, Tennessee. Once he entered, he asked a female employee for some towels - once she turned around to get them, he put his hand over her mouth and threatened her with a knife. Reeves then took the woman to a vacant room and tied her up with duct tape, then proceeded to rape her and abandoning her after he was done. After stealing money from the cash register, he promptly left the building.

Some time after the attack in Bristol, Reeves moved to Knoxville. At around 11 PM, he caught a woman leaving her workplace from a late-night shift and forced her into his truck. He then drove to a nearby motel, where he bound and raped her in an identical fashion to the previous victim. Along the way to the motel, he also stabbed his victim to prevent her from alerting a passing vehicle.

=== Arrest and identification ===
On October 19, Reeves was arrested in Smyth County, Virginia, and charged with multiple counts of rape, abduction and attempted murder.

Upon closely inspecting his background, local authorities started to realize that he might be connected to the murders in Marion, as well as the Toler murder in North Carolina. Because of this, focus was shifted onto him as the prime suspect, leading to the subsequent dropping of all charges against Robert Shumate.

== Investigation and trials ==
During their subsequent investigations into Reeves, authorities discovered numerous pieces of circumstantial evidence that indicated he might be responsible for the crimes. Some examples of this were that following the Shumate murder, he decided to have his truck repainted and a new seat installed and that he was in the store on the day she disappeared. In addition to this, investigators also found an uncapped bottle of "Michelob Light" beer on the checkout counter - this was a brand of beer that Reeves was known to enjoy, but the item was never seen for fingerprinting until after Reeves' arrest.

Around November 1989, it was decided that Reeves should undergo a psychiatric evaluation for the rape charges against the unnamed USFS worker. While still awaiting the results of the evaluation, he was charged with the murder of Toler after North Carolina authorities found his pistol and identified it as the murder weapon.

=== Virginia rape trial ===
It was decided that Reeves would first be tried for the attack on the USFS employee, and after a change of venue was denied, his trial was set to begin in October 1990. When the trial began, the victim herself was called in to testify against Reeves, who himself refused to participate. In the end, Reeves was found guilty on two counts of sexual assault, one count of abduction with intent to sexually assault, robbery and attempted murder. Throughout the proceedings, it was noted that Reeves stared at the victim while she was giving her testimony.

As a potential sentence, the jury recommended two life terms plus an additional 100 years imprisonment.

=== North Carolina murder trial ===
After the rape trial, Reeves was charged with the murder of Susan Toler, with testimony from the unnamed USFS worker being used to link his truck to the crime scene. He pleaded guilty to the crime, and was later sentenced to death for it, with the prosecutor describing the murder as a "worst-case scenario" in which an innocent woman was brutally killed in the presence of her young child.

== Current status ==
Later on in 1993, Reeves was charged with the murder of Hagy, but was never brought to trial for it. This was later revealed to be the work of a secret deal between Governors James G. Martin and Douglas Wilder, who concluded that if Reeves was indeed sentenced to death in North Carolina, there would be no need to transfer him over to stand trial for the Virginia crimes.

Reeves was originally scheduled to be executed in 1995, but he received a stay of execution to pursue further appeals. As of January 2025, he remains on the state death row awaiting execution due to the unofficial moratorium on executions in the state.

== See also ==
- Capital punishment in North Carolina
- List of death row inmates in the United States § North Carolina
