= Steven Van McHone =

Steven Van McHone (March 23, 1970 – November 11, 2005) was an American convicted murderer executed by the U.S. state of North Carolina. He was convicted of killing his mother, Mildred Johnson Adams, and stepfather, Wesley Dalton Adams Sr., on June 3, 1990, in Surry County, North Carolina.

== Crime ==
On the night of June 3, 1990, Steven McHone's stepbrother, Wesley Adams Jr., and his wife, Wendy, were visiting Wesley Adams Sr. and his wife, Mildred. Just after midnight, McHone was heard arguing with the couple by Wesley Jr. and Wendy, who were in bed. Mildred Adams entered their room and asked if they had moved a handgun that was in the house. They replied that they had not, and she left, closing the door. Before Wesley Jr. could get dressed, three shots were heard. Wendy said that she heard the elder Wesley tell her husband to call 9-1-1. Wesley Jr. then saw his father and stepbrother wrestling, with McHone holding a handgun. Wesley Jr. managed to disarm McHone; however, as he returned to the phone, the wrestling resumed, and both men moved out of sight, up a hallway. His father returned about a minute later, saying that his stepmother was "facedown out back." McHone reappeared carrying a shotgun, raising it into a firing position. As his stepfather approached him and attempted to grab the gun, McHone fired, throwing Wesley Sr. with such force that he hit and knocked down Wesley Jr. McHone and Wesley Jr. struggled again, with McHone cursing Wesley Jr. and crying, asking Wesley Jr. to shoot him for what he had done.

When the first response team arrived at the scene, they found Wesley Sr. dead with a large chest wound and Mildred Adams alive but with a gunshot wound to the head. Around 2:00 a.m., a deputy sheriff with the Surry County Sheriff's Department arrived, and McHone was placed into a patrol car. The deputy sheriff testified that although he smelled alcohol on McHone's breath, he did not believe McHone was too intoxicated to not understand his actions and their consequences.

== Execution ==
McHone was sentenced to death on March 7, 1991.

His appeals centered on the fact that he was under the influence of alcohol and possibly other drugs at the time of the murders. Voluntary intoxication is a defense to a capital indictment under North Carolina state law. Additionally, McHone's trial counsel failed to object to inappropriate statements made by the prosecutor and provided an unsatisfactory jury instruction.

On November 9, 2005, the execution had been stayed after Surry County Superior Court Judge Anderson Cromer agreed to hear testimony from paramedic Teresa Durham, who said in an affidavit that Mildred Adams claimed McHone had not shot her. However, the next day, the North Carolina Supreme Court overturned the ruling without a reason in their one-page decision.

Clemency was denied by Governor Mike Easley on November 10, and McHone's appeal to the Supreme Court of the United States was denied without comment. Easley met with McHone's family, some of whom did not wish for his execution.

For his last meal he ordered medium rare porterhouse steak, steak fries, chocolate cheesecake, and a 20 oz. Mountain Dew. After entering the execution chamber strapped to a gurney at 1:50 a.m., he did not make an official final statement but reportedly said "I'm so sorry" to his stepbrother. McHone then exchanged smiles and laughter with his attorney and two friends, who were among nine people who served as official witnesses.

At approximately 2:00 a.m., executioners added a sedative to McHone's intravenous lines. He closed his eyes within two minutes and appeared to be asleep. Two lethal chemicals were added, and at 2:05 a.m. McHone's torso shook quickly, and his face became pale. He appeared not to move afterwards and was pronounced dead at 2:10 a.m.

Wesley Adams Jr. released a statement after the execution: "We have sympathy and pray for comfort for those who will grieve Steve's passing. We do, however, feel that justice was upheld and that this fate was sealed many years ago. We feel that the enforcement of duly deliberated and prescribed sentences sends a stronger message regarding the sanctity of human life than does sparing those who have willfully and brutally taken a life."

== See also ==
- Capital punishment in North Carolina
- Capital punishment in the United States
- List of people executed in North Carolina
- List of people executed in the United States in 2005

== General references ==
- "McHone dies by lethal injection at 2:10 a.m., executed for murder of mother, stepfather". Winston-Salem Journal. November 11, 2005. Archived from the original on May 5, 2007.
- "N.C. death row inmate executed for murder of mother, stepfather". Associated Press. November 11, 2005.
- Report from the National Coalition to Abolish the Death Penalty
- Offender Data Screen from North Carolina Department of Correction
