= Earl Richmond =

Earl Richmond may refer to:

- Earl Richmond (broadcaster)
- Earl Richmond (serial killer)

== See also ==
- Earl of Richmond
