= List of people executed in the United States in 2005 =

Sixty people were executed in the United States in 2005. Nineteen of them were in the state of Texas. One (Frances Elaine Newton) was female. The states of Connecticut and Maryland carried out their last executions in 2005, as both states abolished the death penalty in the early 2010s.

== List of people executed in the United States in 2005 ==
No.	Date of execution	Name	Age of person			Gender	Ethnicity	State	Method	Ref.
No.	Date of execution	Name	At execution	At offense	Age difference	Gender	Ethnicity	State	Method	Ref.
1	January 4, 2005	James Scott Porter	33	28	5	Male	White	Texas	Lethal injection	
2	January 19, 2005	Donald Jay Beardslee	61	37	24	Male	White	California	Lethal injection	
3	January 25, 2005	Troy Albert Kunkle	38	18	20	Male	White	Texas	Lethal injection	
4	January 25, 2005	Timothy Don Carr	34	22	12	Male	White	Georgia	Lethal injection	
5	February 17, 2005	Dennis Wayne Bagwell	41	31	10	Male	White	Texas	Lethal injection	
6	March 1, 2005	Stephen Anthony Mobley	39	25	14	Male	White	Georgia	Lethal injection	
7	March 8, 2005	William Henry Smith	47	29	18	Male	Black	Ohio	Lethal injection	
8	March 8, 2005	George Anderson Hopper	49	27	22	Male	White	Texas	Lethal injection	
9	March 10, 2005	Donald Ray Wallace Jr.	47	22	25	Male	White	Indiana	Lethal injection	
10	March 11, 2005	William Dillard Powell	58	45	13	Male	White	North Carolina	Lethal injection	
11	March 15, 2005	Jimmie Ray Slaughter	57	44	13	Male	White	Oklahoma	Lethal injection	
12	March 16, 2005	Stanley L. Hall	37	26	11	Male	Black	Missouri	Lethal injection	
13	April 5, 2005	Glen James Ocha	47	41	6	Male	White	Florida	Lethal injection	
14	April 15, 2005	Richard Longworth	37	22	15	Male	White	South Carolina	Lethal injection	
15	April 20, 2005	Douglas Alan Roberts	42	33	9	Male	White	Texas	Lethal injection	
16	April 21, 2005	Bill J. Benefiel	48	30	18	Male	White	Indiana	Lethal injection	
17	April 27, 2005	Donald Jones	38	26	12	Male	Black	Missouri	Lethal injection	
18	April 28, 2005	Mario Giovanni Centobie	39	32	7	Male	White	Alabama	Lethal injection	
19	May 3, 2005	Lonnie Wayne Pursley	43	35	8	Male	White	Texas	Lethal injection	
20	May 6, 2005	Earl J. Richmond Jr.	43	29	14	Male	Black	North Carolina	Lethal injection	
21	May 12, 2005	George James Miller Jr.	37	27	10	Male	Black	Oklahoma	Lethal injection	
22	May 13, 2005	Michael Bruce Ross	45	24	21	Male	White	Connecticut	Lethal injection	
23	May 18, 2005	Vernon Brown	51	33	18	Male	Black	Missouri	Lethal injection	
24	May 18, 2005	Bryan Eric Wolfe	44	31	13	Male	Black	Texas	Lethal injection	
25	May 19, 2005	Richard Michael Cartwright	31	22	9	Male	White	Texas	Lethal injection	
26	May 25, 2005	Gregory Scott Johnson	40	20	20	Male	White	Indiana	Lethal injection	
27	June 2, 2005	Jerry Paul Henderson	58	37	21	Male	White	Alabama	Lethal injection	
28	June 7, 2005	Alexander Rey Martinez	28	25	3	Male	Hispanic	Texas	Lethal injection	
29	July 12, 2005	Robert Dale Conklin	44	23	21	Male	White	Georgia	Lethal injection	
30	July 19, 2005	Michael Lannier Pennington	37	23	14	Male	Black	Oklahoma	Lethal injection	
31	July 27, 2005	Kevin Aaron Conner	40	22	18	Male	White	Indiana	Lethal injection	
32	July 28, 2005	David Aaron Martinez	29	21	8	Male	Hispanic	Texas	Lethal injection	
33	August 4, 2005	George Everette Sibley Jr.	62	51	11	Male	White	Alabama	Lethal injection	
34	August 10, 2005	Gary Lynn Sterling	38	20	18	Male	Black	Texas	Lethal injection	
35	August 11, 2005	Kenneth Eugene Turrentine	52	41	11	Male	Black	Oklahoma	Lethal injection	
36	August 23, 2005	Robert Alan Shields Jr.	30	19	11	Male	White	Texas	Lethal injection	
37	August 31, 2005	Timothy Johnston	44	28	16	Male	White	Missouri	Lethal injection	
38	September 14, 2005	Frances Elaine Newton	40	21	19	Female	Black	Texas	Lethal injection	
39	September 22, 2005	John W. Peoples Jr.	48	26	22	Male	White	Alabama	Lethal injection	
40	September 27, 2005	Herman Dale Ashworth	32	23	9	Male	White	Ohio	Lethal injection	
41	September 28, 2005	Alan Lehman Matheney	54	38	16	Male	White	Indiana	Lethal injection	
42	October 6, 2005	Ronald Ray Howard	32	18	14	Male	Black	Texas	Lethal injection	
43	October 20, 2005	Luis L. Ramirez	42	34	8	Male	Hispanic	Texas	Lethal injection	
44	October 25, 2005	Willie J. "Flip" Williams Jr.	48	34	14	Male	Black	Ohio	Lethal injection	
45	October 26, 2005	Marlin Gray	38	23	15	Male	Black	Missouri	Lethal injection	
46	November 3, 2005	Melvin Wayne White	55	47	8	Male	White	Texas	Lethal injection	
47	November 4, 2005	Brian David Steckel	36	25	11	Male	White	Delaware	Lethal injection	
48	November 4, 2005	Hastings Arthur Wise	51	43	8	Male	Black	South Carolina	Lethal injection	
49	November 9, 2005	Charles Daniel Thacker	37	24	13	Male	White	Texas	Lethal injection	
50	November 11, 2005	Steven Van McHone	35	20	15	Male	White	North Carolina	Lethal injection	
51	November 15, 2005	Robert Dale Rowell	50	38	12	Male	White	Texas	Lethal injection	
52	November 16, 2005	Shannon Charles Thomas	34	22	12	Male	Black	Texas	Lethal injection	
53	November 18, 2005	Elias Hanna Syriani	67	52	15	Male	Arab	North Carolina	Lethal injection	
54	November 28, 2005	Eric Randall Nance	45	33	12	Male	White	Arkansas	Lethal injection	
55	November 29, 2005	John R. Hicks	49	29	20	Male	Black	Ohio	Lethal injection	
56	December 2, 2005	Kenneth Lee Boyd	57	40	17	Male	White	North Carolina	Lethal injection	
57	December 2, 2005	Shawn Paul Humphries	34	22	12	Male	White	South Carolina	Lethal injection	
58	December 5, 2005	Wesley Eugene Baker	47	33	14	Male	Black	Maryland	Lethal injection	
59	December 13, 2005	Stanley Tookie Williams III	51	25	26	Male	Black	California	Lethal injection	
60	December 14, 2005	John B. Nixon Sr.	77	56	21	Male	White	Mississippi	Lethal injection	
		Average:	44 years	30 years	14 years					

== Demographics ==
Gender
Male	59	98%
Female	1	2%
Ethnicity
White	37	62%
Black	19	32%
Hispanic	3	5%
Arab	1	2%
State
Texas	19	32%
Indiana	5	8%
Missouri	5	8%
North Carolina	5	8%
Alabama	4	7%
Ohio	4	7%
Oklahoma	4	7%
Georgia	3	5%
South Carolina	3	5%
California	2	3%
Arkansas	1	2%
Connecticut	1	2%
Delaware	1	2%
Florida	1	2%
Maryland	1	2%
Mississippi	1	2%
Method
Lethal injection	60	100%
Month
January	4	7%
February	1	2%
March	7	12%
April	6	10%
May	8	13%
June	2	3%
July	4	7%
August	5	8%
September	4	7%
October	4	7%
November	10	17%
December	5	8%
Age
20–29	2	3%
30–39	21	35%
40–49	22	37%
50–59	11	18%
60–69	3	5%
70–79	1	2%
Total	60	100%

== Executions in recent years ==
Number of executions
2006	53
2005	60
2004	59
Total	172

== See also ==
- List of death row inmates in the United States
- List of most recent executions by jurisdiction
- List of people scheduled to be executed in the United States
- List of women executed in the United States since 1976

Preceded by 2004	List of people executed in the United States in 2005	Succeeded by 2006
