= List of people executed in the United States in 2002 =

Seventy-one people, sixty-nine male and two female, Lynda Lyon Block and Aileen Carol Wuornos, were executed in the United States in 2002, seventy by lethal injection and one, Lynda Lyon Block, was executed by electrocution. Thirty-three of them were in the state of Texas.

== List of people executed in the United States in 2002 ==
No.	Date of execution	Name	Age of person			Gender	Ethnicity	State	Method	Ref.
No.	Date of execution	Name	At execution	At offense	Age difference	Gender	Ethnicity	State	Method	Ref.
1	January 9, 2002	James R. Johnson	52	42	10	Male	White	Missouri	Lethal injection	
2	January 9, 2002	Michael Patrick Moore	38	30	8	Male	White	Texas	Lethal injection	
3	January 16, 2002	Jermarr Carlos Arnold	43	24	19	Male	Black	Texas	Lethal injection	
4	January 24, 2002	Ronald Keith Spivey	62	37	25	Male	White	Georgia	Lethal injection	
5	January 29, 2002	Stephen Wayne Anderson	48	26	22	Male	White	California	Lethal injection	
6	January 29, 2002	John Joseph Romano	43	27	16	Male	White	Oklahoma	Lethal injection	
7	January 30, 2002	Windell Broussard	41	32	9	Male	Black	Texas	Lethal injection	
8	January 31, 2002	Randall Wayne Hafdahl Sr.	48	32	16	Male	White	Texas	Lethal injection	
9	January 31, 2002	David Wayne Woodruff	42	25	17	Male	White	Oklahoma	Lethal injection	
10	February 6, 2002	Michael Owsley	40	31	9	Male	Black	Missouri	Lethal injection	
11	February 19, 2002	John William Byrd Jr.	38	19	19	Male	White	Ohio	Lethal injection	
12	February 28, 2002	Monty Allen Delk	35	19	16	Male	White	Texas	Lethal injection	
13	March 6, 2002	Jeffrey Lane Tokar	37	27	10	Male	White	Missouri	Lethal injection	
14	March 7, 2002	Gerald Wayne Tigner Jr.	29	20	9	Male	Black	Texas	Lethal injection	
15	March 12, 2002	Tracy Lee Housel	43	26	17	Male	White	Georgia	Lethal injection	
16	March 14, 2002	James Earl Patterson	35	19	16	Male	White	Virginia	Lethal injection	
17	April 2, 2002	Daniel Lee Zirkle	33	30	3	Male	White	Virginia	Lethal injection	
18	April 10, 2002	Paul W. Kreutzer	30	20	10	Male	White	Missouri	Lethal injection	
19	April 10, 2002	Jose Santellan Sr.	40	31	9	Male	Hispanic	Texas	Lethal injection	
20	April 11, 2002	William Kendrick Burns	43	22	21	Male	Black	Texas	Lethal injection	
21	April 18, 2002	Gerald Dwight Casey	47	34	13	Male	White	Texas	Lethal injection	
22	April 26, 2002	Alton Coleman	46	28	18	Male	Black	Ohio	Lethal injection	
23	April 30, 2002	Rodolpho Baiza Hernandez	52	35	17	Male	Hispanic	Texas	Lethal injection	
24	May 3, 2002	Richard Charles Johnson	39	22	17	Male	White	South Carolina	Lethal injection	
25	May 9, 2002	Reginald Lenard Reeves	28	19	9	Male	Black	Texas	Lethal injection	
26	May 10, 2002	Lynda Lyon Block	54	45	9	Female	White	Alabama	Electrocution	
27	May 10, 2002	Leslie Dale Martin	35	24	11	Male	White	Louisiana	Lethal injection	
28	May 16, 2002	Ronford Lee Styron Jr.	32	24	8	Male	White	Texas	Lethal injection	
29	May 22, 2002	Johnny Joe Martinez	29	20	9	Male	Hispanic	Texas	Lethal injection	
30	May 28, 2002	Napoleon Beazley	25	17	8	Male	Black	Texas	Lethal injection	
31	May 30, 2002	Stanley Allison Baker Jr.	35	27	8	Male	White	Texas	Lethal injection	
32	June 12, 2002	Walter Mickens Jr.	47	37	10	Male	Black	Virginia	Lethal injection	
33	June 13, 2002	Daniel Earl Reneau	27	20	7	Male	White	Texas	Lethal injection	
34	June 25, 2002	Robert Otis Coulson	34	24	10	Male	White	Texas	Lethal injection	
35	June 26, 2002	Jeffery Lynn Williams	30	23	7	Male	Black	Texas	Lethal injection	
36	July 17, 2002	Tracy Alan Hansen	39	23	16	Male	White	Mississippi	Lethal injection	
37	July 23, 2002	Randall Eugene Cannon	42	25	17	Male	White	Oklahoma	Lethal injection	
38	July 30, 2002	Earl Alexander Frederick Sr.	51	38	13	Male	White	Oklahoma	Lethal injection	
39	August 7, 2002	Richard William Kutzner	59	53	6	Male	White	Texas	Lethal injection	
40	August 8, 2002	T. J. Jones	25	17	8	Male	Black	Texas	Lethal injection	
41	August 14, 2002	Javier Suarez Medina	33	19	14	Male	Hispanic	Texas	Lethal injection	
42	August 14, 2002	Daniel Anthony Basile	35	25	10	Male	White	Missouri	Lethal injection	
43	August 16, 2002	Wallace Marvin Fugate III	52	41	11	Male	White	Georgia	Lethal injection	
44	August 20, 2002	Gary Wayne Etheridge	38	26	12	Male	White	Texas	Lethal injection	
45	August 23, 2002	Anthony Green	40	25	15	Male	Black	South Carolina	Lethal injection	
46	August 28, 2002	Toronto Markkey Patterson	24	17	7	Male	Black	Texas	Lethal injection	
47	September 10, 2002	Tony Lee Walker	36	26	10	Male	Black	Texas	Lethal injection	
48	September 13, 2002	Michael Joseph Passaro	40	36	4	Male	White	South Carolina	Lethal injection	
49	September 17, 2002	Jessie Joe Patrick	44	31	13	Male	White	Texas	Lethal injection	
50	September 18, 2002	Ron Scott Shamburger	30	22	8	Male	White	Texas	Lethal injection	
51	September 24, 2002	Rex Warren Mays	42	32	10	Male	White	Texas	Lethal injection	
52	September 25, 2002	Robert Anthony Buell	62	41	21	Male	White	Ohio	Lethal injection	
53	September 25, 2002	Calvin Eugene King	48	40	8	Male	Black	Texas	Lethal injection	
54	October 1, 2002	James Rexford Powell	56	44	12	Male	White	Texas	Lethal injection	
55	October 2, 2002	Rigoberto Sanchez-Velasco	43	27	16	Male	Hispanic	Florida	Lethal injection	
56	October 9, 2002	Aileen Carol Wuornos	46	33–34	12–13	Female	White	Florida	Lethal injection	
57	November 13, 2002	William Howard Putman	59	37	22	Male	White	Georgia	Lethal injection	
58	November 14, 2002	Mir Aimal Kasi	38	28	10	Male	Asian	Virginia	Lethal injection	
59	November 19, 2002	Craig Neil Ogan Jr.	47	34	13	Male	White	Texas	Lethal injection	
60	November 20, 2002	William Robert Jones Jr.	37	21	16	Male	White	Missouri	Lethal injection	
61	November 20, 2002	William Wesley Chappell	66	51	15	Male	White	Texas	Lethal injection	
62	December 4, 2002	Leonard Uresti Rojas	52	44	8	Male	Hispanic	Texas	Lethal injection	
63	December 6, 2002	Ernest West Basden	50	39	11	Male	White	North Carolina	Lethal injection	
64	December 9, 2002	Linroy Bottoson	63	40	23	Male	Black	Florida	Lethal injection	
65	December 10, 2002	Desmond Keith Carter	35	24	11	Male	Black	North Carolina	Lethal injection	
66	December 10, 2002	Jerry Lynn McCracken	35	23	12	Male	White	Oklahoma	Lethal injection	
67	December 11, 2002	James Paul Collier	55	48	7	Male	White	Texas	Lethal injection	
68	December 11, 2002	Jessie Derrell Williams	51	31	20	Male	White	Mississippi	Lethal injection	
69	December 12, 2002	Jay Wesley Neill	37	19	18	Male	White	Oklahoma	Lethal injection	
70	December 12, 2002	Anthony Keith Johnson	46	27	19	Male	White	Alabama	Lethal injection	
71	December 17, 2002	Ernest Marvin Carter Jr.	36	23	13	Male	Black	Oklahoma	Lethal injection	
		Average:	42 years	29 years	13 years					

== Demographics ==
Gender
Male	69	97%
Female	2	3%
Ethnicity
White	46	65%
Black	18	25%
Hispanic	6	8%
Asian	1	1%
State
Texas	33	46%
Oklahoma	7	10%
Missouri	6	8%
Georgia	4	6%
Virginia	4	6%
Florida	3	4%
Ohio	3	4%
South Carolina	3	4%
Alabama	2	3%
Mississippi	2	3%
North Carolina	2	3%
California	1	1%
Louisiana	1	1%
Method
Lethal injection	70	99%
Electrocution	1	1%
Month
January	9	13%
February	3	4%
March	4	6%
April	7	10%
May	8	11%
June	4	6%
July	3	4%
August	8	11%
September	7	10%
October	3	4%
November	5	7%
December	10	14%
Age
20–29	7	10%
30–39	25	35%
40–49	23	32%
50–59	12	17%
60–69	4	6%
Total	71	100%

== Executions in recent years ==
Number of executions
2003	65
2002	71
2001	66
Total	202

== See also ==
- List of death row inmates in the United States
- List of most recent executions by jurisdiction
- List of people scheduled to be executed in the United States
- List of women executed in the United States since 1976

Preceded by 2001	List of people executed in the United States in 2002	Succeeded by 2003
