= 1995 Fayetteville murders =

1995 murders of a black couple in North Carolina, U.S.

The 1995 Fayetteville murders were the killings of a black couple by white supremacists in Fayetteville, North Carolina, on December 7, 1995. The killers, James Norman Burmeister and Malcolm Wright, were paratroopers at Fort Bragg where Burmeister was reportedly open about his views, and had a Nazi flag hanging in his room. The Fayetteville police reported that a search of a room rented by Burmeister had turned up a Nazi flag, white supremacist literature, and a VHS tape of Natural Born Killers.

== Victims ==
The victims, 36-year-old Michael James and 27-year-old Jackie Burden, were shot multiple times in the head. Fayetteville police described them as "two innocent people walking down the street". The shooters and victims did not previously know each other.

== Trial ==
The key witness in the trial was a fellow paratrooper Randy Lee Meadows. Meadows, who had pleaded guilty to conspiracy and accessory charges, testified that he and the shooters had drunk a lot of beer before driving to predominantly black working-class neighborhoods looking for blacks to harass. Meadows testified that he heard gunshots, found the bodies of the victims and that he was unable to find the shooters. Meadows also testified that Burmeister had confessed to the killing to him while in jail. No fingerprints were found on Burmeister's pistol.

The Fayetteville district attorney said "This was just a pure execution".

Burmeister was found guilty of two counts of first-degree murder and conspiracy. Both shooters were convicted and sentenced to life in prison. Burmeister nearly received a death sentence, but was saved by a single juror when the jury deadlocked 11–1 in favor of a death sentence. Because the vote was not unanimous Superior Court Judge Coy Brewer had to impose the life sentences. If Burmeister had received a death sentence he would have been only the sixth white person in the United States sentenced to die for killing a black person since the death penalty was reinstated in 1976.

In October 1998, Burmeister was moved from Central Prison to an undisclosed federal prison in Colorado after expressing concerns for his safety. The move was prompted after two episodes in which black inmates had been allowed near him. Burmeister died in federal prison on March 21, 2007.

== White supremacism ==
According to police, the suspects were not affiliated with a white supremacist organization: "They told us they weren't, we felt that they were pretty honest about that." A representative for Fort Bragg said that they considered other incidents connected to implicating hate groups in plans to steal munitions from the base "isolated incidents", including a 1986 case where three members of a hate group were arrested in Fayetteville for plotting to use stolen army explosives to blow up the Southern Poverty Law Center.

Prosecutors said the killings were racially motivated. Based on Meadows' testimony they said that Burmeister had killed the victims because he wanted a spiderweb tattoo—worn by some members of skinhead groups as a symbol of having killed a black person.

Lloyd Austin, who became the first African-American defense secretary in 2021, was a lieutenant colonel with the 82nd Airborne Division at Fort Bragg in 1995. Speaking at his confirmation hearing, he said "We woke up one day and discovered that we had extremist elements in our ranks. The signs for that activity were there all along, We just didn't know what to look for," and that they had learned from it.

Wade Michael Page, the Wisconsin Sikh temple shooter, was also stationed at Fort Bragg in 1995. According to Bruce Hoffman and Jacob Ware, Page was radicalized in the military. Open expressions of neo-Nazism were common at Fort Bragg in 1995, and there was a recruitment board encouraging soldiers to join the white supremacist organization National Alliance.

== Army policy ==
At the time of the shootings, the army policy on extremism recognized a distinction between passive participation and active participation, prohibiting only the latter, although their policy did state that "the activities of extremist organizations are inconsistent with the responsibilities of military service." The language of active participation came from an Eisenhower era executive order, issued during the Cold War against "totalitarian, Fascist, Communist, or subversive" groups that supported violence to deny other people their rights under the United States Constitution, or "alter the form of government of the United States by unconstitutional means".
