= Alan Matheney =

American murderer (1950–2005)

Alan Lehman Matheney
- Born: November 6, 1950; Butler County, Ohio, U.S.
- Died: September 28, 2005 (aged 54); Indiana State Prison, Indiana, U.S.
- Spouse: Lisa Bianco (1977–1985)
- Status: Executed by lethal injection
- Motive: Victim divorced him
- Convictions: Murder; Battery; Criminal confinement Burglary
- Penalty: Death (May 11, 1990)

Details
- Victims: Lisa Bianco, 34 (ex-wife)
- Date: March 4, 1989
- Location: Mishawaka, Indiana

Alan Lehman Matheney (November 6, 1950 – September 28, 2005) was an American convicted of beating his ex-wife to death, Lisa Bianco, with a .410 bore shotgun while on an eight-hour furlough from prison on March 4, 1989. At the time he was serving a sentence at Pendleton Correctional Facility for battery and confinement of Bianco.

== Background ==
Matheney married Lisa Bianco in 1977. The two lived together in Mishawaka, Indiana. They had two daughters together. During their marriage, Matheney became physically abusive towards his wife. In 1985, Bianco divorced him. Shortly after the divorce was finalized, Alan kidnapped their two daughters and fled out of state. He came back with them when Bianco promised to drop the charges.

In 1987, Matheney was charged with beating and raping Bianco.

== Murder ==
The eight-hour release pass authorized Matheney to travel to Indianapolis; instead he travelled to St. Joseph County. He changed clothes and took an unloaded shotgun from a friend's house. He then traveled to Mishawaka and parked his car two houses down from Bianco's home. He broke into her house through the back door and then chased her down the street. He caught and beat her to death with the shotgun while his two daughters and numerous neighbors looked on. Even so, this case was held up on appeals for 16 years. The case caused a law change in the state of Indiana, which required victims to be informed if an inmate was released. The State also agreed to pay the estate of Bianco $900,000 in compensation.

At his trial he argued that he was legally insane. One mental health professional diagnosed him as having schizophreniform disorder and another said he had paranoid personality disorder with psychotic delusions. None said he was legally insane at the time of the crime. Matheney stated that he believed Bianco was in a conspiracy against him.

He refused to appear before a hearing of the Indiana Parole Board on September 19. Then on September 24, 2005, the Indiana Supreme Court ruled 5–0 to reject a request for a new trial. Finally, Governor Mitch Daniels denied clemency on September 27.

His lawyer released a final statement that read:

I love my family and my children. I'm sorry for the pain I've caused them. I thank my friends who stood by me … I'm sure my grandchildren will grow up happy and healthy in the care of their wonderful parents.

He was convicted of burglary and murder. He was executed by lethal injection on September 28, 2005, at Indiana State Prison at Michigan City. Time of death was announced as 12:27 a.m.

This was the fifth execution in the state in 2005. This is the most executions in a calendar year in Indiana since executions were resumed in 1977.

== Aftermath ==
The murder of Lisa Bianco inspired the use of the purple ribbon to represent domestic violence awareness, as purple as had been Bianco's favorite color. Her family and friends tied purple ribbons throughout the county.

== See also ==
- Capital punishment in Indiana
- Capital punishment in the United States
- List of people executed in Indiana
- List of people executed in the United States in 2005

Executions carried out in Indiana
Preceded by Kevin Aaron Conner July 27, 2005	Alan Matheney; September 28, 2005	Succeeded by Marvin Bieghler January 27, 2006
Executions carried out in the United States
Preceded by Herman Ashworth – Ohio September 27, 2005	Alan Matheney – Indiana; September 28, 2005	Succeeded by Ronald Ray Howard – Texas October 6, 2005
