= Earl Richmond (serial killer) =

Executed American serial killer

- NCDAC mugshot
- Born: November 6, 1961; Fayetteville, North Carolina, U.S.
- Died: May 6, 2005 (aged 43); Central Prison, North Carolina, U.S.
- Status: Executed by lethal injection
- Convictions: Federal; First degree murder North Carolina; First degree murder (4 counts); First degree rape
- Penalty: Federal; Life imprisonment North Carolina; Death

Details
- Victims: 4–5
- Span of crimes: April 5 – November 2, 1991
- Country: United States
- States: New Jersey, North Carolina
- Date apprehended: April 3, 1992

Earl Richmond Jr. (November 6, 1961 – May 6, 2005) was an American serial killer who committed at least four murders, including those of two children, in New Jersey and North Carolina between April and November 1991. Prior to the murders, Richmond served in the United States Army as a drill sergeant at Fort Dix in New Jersey, where he committed multiple rapes. Following his arrest for murder, he was sentenced to death and executed by lethal injection in 2005.

Richmond is also the prime suspect in the murder of 65-year-old Ann Sessoms Shanholtz in 1990.

== Early life ==
Earl Richmond Jr. was born on November 6, 1961, in Fayetteville, North Carolina. Ultimately, not much is known about his childhood and adolescent years, but he entered the military in his early adult years, working up the ranks to serve as a drill sergeant at Fort Dix in Trenton, New Jersey. He was discharged in the fall of 1990 for misconduct.

== Crimes ==
=== Military crimes ===
During his service in the army, multiple women were sexually assaulted in the immediate area. The first of which occurred on April 15, 1989, when a female Air Force trainee was sexually assaulted at gunpoint at a bus stop. Days later, a 17-year-old girl was raped in her motel room just outside of Fort Dix. A man named Richard Stevens was arrested and convicted of the first assault by a federal court, but his conviction was overturned three years later after it was proven that Stevens was most likely innocent. In 1990, Richmond was sanctioned over misconduct and subsequently discharged.

On April 5, 1991, Richmond entered the home of 24-year-old Lisa Ann Nadeau, an Army Specialist based out of Fort Dix, as well as a payroll clerk, from Plainfield, Connecticut. Richmond tied up, strangled, stabbed, and beat Nadeau to death with a hammer. He was not suspected in her murder, but afterward, Richmond traveled to North Carolina.

=== Murder of the Hayes family ===
Richmond began staying with 27-year-old Helisa Hayes and her two children, 8-year-old Philip and 7-year-old Darien. Richmond was a family friend of Hayes, as he had dated one of Hayes' sisters, and was a friend of Hayes' ex-husband, Wayne. On November 2, after apparently getting into an argument, Richmond dragged Hayes into the bedroom where he raped her. Afterward, he forced Philip into the bathroom where he stabbed him 40 times with a pair of scissors, and strangled him with an electrical cord before he strangled Darien with a wire from a curling iron. The bodies were discovered on November 4 by Hayes' father. Police initially focused on Wayne Hayes, Helisa's ex-husband.

== Arrest and convictions ==
It was not until April 1992 that Richmond would become a suspect, and he was brought into the police station for an interview on April 3. During which, he denied involvement. At the same time, a DNA test was brought forward, which confirmed Richmond's involvement. Upon learning this, Richmond confessed to the murders.

After his arrest went public, a complaint was filed by an unidentified woman who alleged that in 1989, when she was 17, she was sexually assaulted by Richmond at a motel. DNA testing connected Richmond to the assault as well as linking him to the murder of Nadeau. Richmond confessed to each of the murders and told officers he intentionally left behind evidence because he wanted to get caught. Richmond was tried in federal court for Nadeau's murder since it occurred on a military base. He was convicted in May 1993 and sentenced to life imprisonment. In May 1995, Richmond was convicted of the Hayes' murders and sentenced to death.

== Execution ==
On May 6, 2005, Richmond was executed by lethal injection at Central Prison in Raleigh, North Carolina. He declined a last meal. Richmond's last words were "I'd like to extend my deepest apologies to all the victims' families and their loved ones. I'd like to say that I'm not a man that shies away from his responsibilities. I'd like to say that I hope that now, through my death, that y'all can move forward with your lives. Thank you and God bless you."

== See also ==
- Capital punishment in North Carolina
- List of people executed in North Carolina
- List of people executed in the United States in 2005
- List of serial killers in the United States
