= Willie Williams (murderer) =

American mass murderer

- Born: William James Williams Jr. November 9, 1956; Youngstown, Ohio, U.S.
- Died: October 25, 2005 (aged 48); Southern Ohio Correctional Facility, Ohio, U.S.
- Other name: Willie Williams
- Status: Executed by lethal injection
- Convictions: Aggravated murder (4 counts); Kidnapping (4 counts); Aggravated burglary
- Penalty: Death

Details
- Victims: 4
- Date: September 2, 1991
- Country: United States
- Location: Mahoning County, Ohio

William James "Flip" Williams Jr. (November 9, 1956 – October 25, 2005) was an American mass murderer and suspected serial killer who was executed by lethal injection. He was convicted of the September 2, 1991, murders of three rival drug dealers and a visitor to their Youngstown, Ohio home. Williams was previously acquitted of a 1981 murder.

Williams had returned to the neighborhood after a long absence to find that several people including Alfonda R. Madison, William L. Dent, and Eric Howard had taken over his drug dealing in the area. He decided to regain control by murdering the three. He enlisted the help of his 16-year-old girlfriend, Jessica M. Cherry; her brother, Dominic M. Cherry; and Dominic Cherry's seventeen-year-old "cousin", Broderick Boone.

On the night of September 1, after Jessica Cherry had previously gone to the house of Madison to discuss a drug deal, Williams arrived with the three accomplices. All but Williams went into the house, where they drew guns on Madison. Using walkie-talkies they signaled for Williams to enter the house. Madison was handcuffed and his mouth taped with duct tape. Theodore Wynn Jr. then arrived at the house, looking for Madison and Howard. Jessica answered the door and told Wynn the two weren't home. Williams realized that Wynn could identify them, so he got Jessica to call him back into the house. Wynn was then handcuffed and gagged. Jessica was then instructed by Williams to use a payphone to call Dent and get him to come to the house. He arrived with Howard and the two were ambushed by Williams and the other three, and forced into the bathroom. Williams then proceeded to strangle Madison and Wynn, and then shot the four victims in the head with a gun owned by Madison.

Dominic Cherry turned himself in to police on September 24. Police then arrested Jessica Cherry and Broderick. The three were held at Mahoning County Juvenile Justice Center. Williams was then arrested but escaped on October 15 and while a fugitive was indicted on four counts of aggravated murder, four counts of kidnapping, and one count of aggravated burglary.

His next action was on January 12, 1992, when he and two other men went to the Juvenile Justice Center and tricked the receptionist into letting them enter. He then held the receptionist and deputy sheriff hostage while demanding to see Jessica, Dominic and Broderick. He would later testify that he planned to kill the three to stop them being witnesses at his trial. He later surrendered and was re-indicted on twelve counts of aggravated murder, four counts of kidnapping, and one count of aggravated burglary. The three juveniles pleaded guilty to delinquency by reason of complicity to aggravated murder, complicity to aggravated burglary, and complicity to kidnapping. Williams pleaded not guilty but was convicted on all counts and was sentenced to death on the four aggravated murder convictions.

Police think that Williams may have killed up to ten other people during his criminal career. He had previously done five years in a California prison for cocaine trafficking and bank robbery. He had also once walked into a police station in Youngstown and asked for information on rival drug dealers in the area.

The Ohio Parole Board recommended that Governor Bob Taft not give clemency in this case, which he withheld on October 24.

He was pronounced dead at 10:20 a.m. EDT on October 25, 2005, after the lethal injection at the Southern Ohio Correctional Facility in Lucasville, Ohio. He did not have a last meal request, though did have a cup of coffee. In his final statement he said:

"I'm not going to waste no time talking about my lifestyle, my case, my punishment. Mom, you've been there for me from the beginning. I love you. To my nieces, nephew and uncle I love you very much. Y'all stick together. Don't worry about me. I'm OK. This all ain't nothing. That's it."

== See also ==
- Capital punishment in Ohio
- Capital punishment in the United States
- List of people executed in Ohio
- List of people executed in the United States in 2005

Executions carried out in Ohio
Preceded by Herman Ashworth September 27, 2005	Willie Williams; October 25, 2005	Succeeded by John R. Hicks November 29, 2005
Executions carried out in the United States
Preceded by Luis L. Ramirez – Texas October 20, 2005	Willie Williams – Ohio; October 25, 2005	Succeeded by Marlin Gray – Missouri October 26, 2005
