= Samuel Flippen =

American criminal (1969–2006)

- NCDAC mugshot
- Born: Samuel Russell Flippen; September 30, 1969; Forsyth County, North Carolina, U.S.
- Died: August 18, 2006 (aged 36); Central Prison, Raleigh, North Carolina, U.S.
- Cause of death: Execution by lethal injection
- Conviction: First degree murder
- Penalty: Death (March 7, 1995)

Details
- Victims: Britnie Nichole Hutton, 2
- Date: February 12, 1994

Samuel Russell Flippen (September 30, 1969 – August 18, 2006) was an American man who was executed in North Carolina for murder. Flippen was sentenced to death for the February 1994 murder of Britnie Nichole Hutton, his 2-year-old stepdaughter. Since his execution, there have been concerns raised about his conviction and whether he may have been innocent. He was convicted based on circumstantial evidence, had no criminal record, and maintained his innocence to the end. Britnie Hutton's biological father opposed the execution. Flippen remains the most recent person executed in North Carolina.

== Incident ==
On the morning of February 12, 1994, Samuel Flippen's wife, Tina Gibson, left her home for work in Forsyth County. She left Flippen alone with her daughter; 2-year-old Britnie Nichole Hutton. About one hour later, Flippen called 911 to report that Hutton had fallen from her chair and was having trouble breathing. Medical personnel responded to the call and found Hutton, who looked pale and made gasping-type respirations. Less than an hour later, Hutton was pronounced dead at the North Carolina Baptist Hospital.

A forensic pathologist performed an autopsy on Hutton and observed injuries to her head, neck, chest, abdomen, and back. He stated that Hutton had died due to internal bleeding, caused by severe tearing of her liver and pancreas. He concluded that the injuries could not have been caused by a fall but instead had been caused by punches or blows to the abdomen. Flippen claimed that on the morning of Hutton's death, he had placed her in a high chair and had gone into another room. He reported hearing a loud noise and returned to discover that Hutton had fallen from the chair and was having difficulty breathing. He then called 911 for assistance.

== Trial ==
Ultimately, Flippen was accused of beating Hutton to death after she would not stop crying. He was charged with first degree murder. The state offered Flippen the chance to plea to the lesser charge of second degree murder, which would have spared him from facing a death sentence. He refused, however.

On March 7, 1995, he was found guilty of the murder of Hutton and was sentenced to death. He was found guilty based on circumstantial evidence. In 1997, the North Carolina Supreme Court overturned his original death sentence and ordered a second jury to consider Flippen's lack of prior criminal convictions before returning a verdict. The second jury deliberated for more than six hours before recommending a death sentence. On May 23, 1997, Flippen was formally sentenced to death again.

At his trial, Gibson testified that Flippen was a violent husband. Prior to Hutton's death, Flippen had no criminal record and had not been in trouble with the law. Friends of his testified that he was a kind person and instead argued that Gibson was the more likely person to have beaten Hutton to death. Gibson was never considered a suspect and received no punishment. Gibson had reportedly left Hutton alone with Flippen on multiple occasions, despite testifying that he was a violent person. Flippen's lawyers also received a statement from a woman who had looked after Gibson's son in 1999. The statement said that the boy was severely bruised from a supposed beating.

== Execution ==
On August 18, 2006, Flippen was executed via lethal injection at Central Prison in Raleigh. His last meal consisted of popcorn shrimp, hush puppies, french fries and a Coke. He made no official final statement. Flippen maintained his innocence to the end and throughout his time on death row.

== Aftermath ==
As of 2026, Flippen remains the most recent person to be executed by the state of North Carolina, which has gone over twenty years without an execution. Since Flippen's execution, there has been a de facto moratorium on the death penalty in North Carolina. It is now the longest gap between executions since capital punishment was banned in the state between 1962 and 1983.

In 2021, Britnie Hutton's biological father, John Hutton, started raising questions about whether Flippen had really killed his daughter. John Hutton's attorneys filed a motion asking a judge to order the Winston-Salem Police Department to hand over their investigative files from the 1994 murder case. In the motion, Hutton's attorneys pointed to the allegation that Tina Gibson had allegedly beat one of her other children years after the death of Britnie Hutton. John Hutton opposed Flippen's execution back in 2006.

On the seventeenth anniversary of Flippen's execution, a crowd gathered at Pullen Memorial Baptist Church in Raleigh to commemorate his death.

== Appeals and Questions About the Case ==
Flippen's case went through several appeals in the North Carolina court system. In November 1996, the North Carolina Supreme Court ruled that his murder trial had been fair but found an error in the sentencing proceeding. The court overturned his death sentence and ordered a new sentencing hearing. This decision did not overturn his murder conviction. A second jury later recommended the death penalty, and Flippen was sentenced to death again in May 1997. The North Carolina Supreme Court reviewed the case again in 1998.

Questions about Flippen's guilt continued even after his appeals. His defense team argued that information about his background, lack of a previous criminal record, and relationships with family and friends supported a request for clemency. Britnie Hutton's biological father, John Hutton, also opposed Flippen's execution. These arguments did not change the outcome of the case, and Flippen continued to maintain his innocence.

In the days before the execution, Flippen's lawyers made additional attempts to delay it. According to contemporary reporting, one last-minute appeal raised claims of new evidence that the defense argued created doubt about whether Flippen had killed Hutton. The courts rejected the requests to delay the execution, and Flippen was executed on August 18, 2006.

Flippen's case continued to draw attention because his lawyers challenged the evidence against him, including in a last-minute appeal before his execution. In August 2006, the North Carolina Supreme Court rejected an appeal based on claims of new evidence that his lawyers argued could raise doubts about his guilt. The case also drew attention to broader concerns about how North Carolina applied the death penalty and whether its use was consistent across cases. Although these concerns did not overturn Flippen's conviction or prevent his execution, they remain part of the public debate surrounding his case.

== See also ==
- Capital punishment in North Carolina
- Capital punishment in the United States
- List of most recent executions by jurisdiction
- List of people executed in North Carolina
- List of people executed in the United States in 2006

Executions carried out in North Carolina
Preceded by Willie Brown Jr. April 20, 2006	Samuel Flippen; August 18, 2006	Succeeded by none
Executions carried out in the United States
Preceded by Richard Hinojosa – Texas August 17, 2006	Samuel Flippen – North Carolina; August 18, 2006	Succeeded by Justin Chaz Fuller – Texas August 24, 2006
