= 2022 Raleigh shootings =

Mass shooting in North Carolina, U.S.

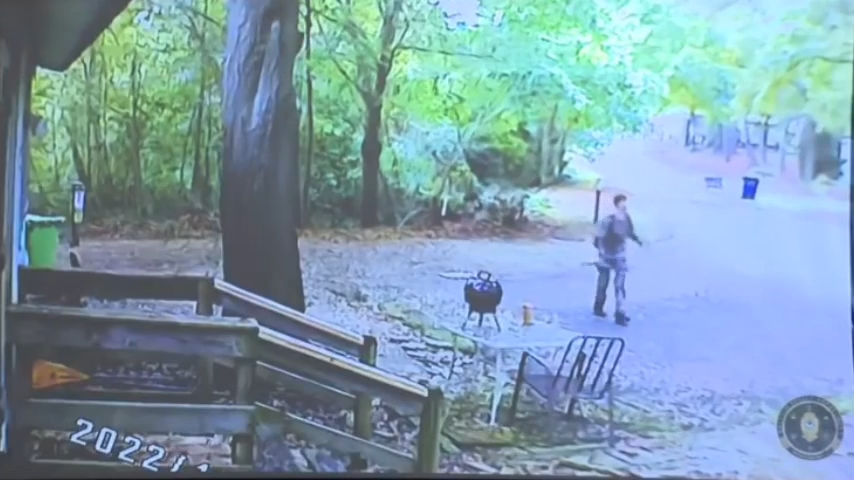
- CCTV still of Thompson carrying a shotgun during the shooting
- Location: Raleigh, North Carolina, U.S.
- Date: October 13, 2022; 4 years ago c. 5:00 – 9:37 p.m. (EDT; UTC−04:00)
- Attack type: Mass shooting; stabbing; shootout; fratricide
- Weapons: 12-gauge Winchester 1200 pump-action shotgun; 9mm Smith & Wesson M&P Shield 2.0 semi-automatic pistol; .22 caliber semi-automatic rifle; Hunting knife
- Deaths: 5
- Injuries: 3 (including the perpetrator)
- Perpetrator: Austin Thompson
- Motive: Misanthropy
- Convictions: 10 counts (Note: First-degree murder (x5); Attempted murder (x2); Assault with a deadly weapon with intent to kill (x2); Assault with a firearm on a law enforcement officer)

On October 13, 2022, a mass shooting took place in the Hedingham neighborhood of Raleigh, North Carolina, United States. Five people were killed, and three others were injured. The perpetrator, 15-year-old Austin Thompson, was detained after being cornered by police at a nearby residence and suffering a critical self-inflicted gunshot wound to the head. Thompson survived his head injury and began physical rehabilitation. He was transferred from a hospital to the medical unit of a juvenile correctional facility. On January 21, 2026, Thompson pleaded guilty on all counts. On February 13, 2026, Thompson was sentenced to five consecutive sentences of life in prison without parole.

== Shootings ==
The shootings began in a residential area near the Neuse River Trail shortly after 5 p.m. on October 13, 2022. Thompson first killed his brother James Thompson at home by shooting him in the head with a .22 caliber semi-automatic rifle and stabbing him 57 times in the neck. Then, armed with a shotgun, handgun, and hunting knife, Thompson went out into the street, where he fatally shot Nicole Connors and her dog Sami, and critically wounded Lynn Gardiner, a visiting friend who was in the driveway of the same house. Thompson proceeded through Hedingham, shooting to death Gabriel Torres, an off-duty police officer in the 6000 block of Osprey Drive. He then ran to the nearby Neuse River Trail, where he fatally shot Susan Karnatz, who was jogging, and Mary Marshall, who was walking her pet dog.

A police dog eventually tracked Thompson to a wooded area with two barn-like buildings. When the police arrived at 6:45 p.m., Thompson fired multiple times at them, injuring officer Casey Clark. Several officers returned fire, shooting an estimated 23 rounds at the building. After setting a perimeter around the structure, officers commanded Thompson to surrender his weapons and come out with his hands up. At 9:34 p.m., Selective Enforcement Unit officers breached the building and found Thompson inside. Thompson had suffered a gunshot wound to the head and was transported to WakeMed to be treated.

Five people and a dog were killed, and two others were wounded. There were four separate crime scenes spanning 2 miles (3.2 km). Police received the first 9-1-1 call about the shooting at 5:13, P:M, and At 5:55, P:M, the Raleigh Police Department announced on Twitter that it was on the scene of an active shooter situation in the area. While Thompson was at large, local residents were advised by law enforcement at 6:49 p.m.to stay indoors.

== Perpetrator ==
Austin David Thompson was identified as the perpetrator who, at the time, was a 15-year-old sophomore at Knightdale High School. The Wake County District Attorney announced that there were plans to charge Thompson as an adult. Immediately after the shooting, Thompson was reported as in a "grave" condition; he was moved to a rehab facility in November for additional treatment after being charged with the five killings on November 11.

Thompson left a note in his home in which he stated, "I did this because I hate humans. They are destroying the planet/earth." This note was not immediately released, and the police instead stated that his motive was unknown. Thompson's attorneys initially stated that Thompson couldn't explain his motive due to his brain injury. His note eventually was released to the public during a court hearing on February 5, 2026.

== Investigation ==
Multiple law enforcement agencies, including the Raleigh Police Department and the ATF, were involved with the investigation. Governor Roy Cooper deployed state resources to assist investigators at the crime scenes. A "five-day report," including a detailed outline of the incident, was filed to the Raleigh city manager on October 20, 2022, one week after the shootings.

== Legal proceedings ==
Thompson made his first official court appearance on October 4, 2023, where he was charged as an adult with five counts of murder, two counts of attempted murder, two counts assault with deadly weapon with intent to kill, and one count of assault with firearm on law enforcement officer. His father was also cited for failing to store his guns.

Thompson was originally scheduled to go on trial in September 2025, which was later pushed to February 2, 2026. He was to be tried as an adult. Before the trial date, his attorneys filed documents with the court stating that Austin Thompson would plead guilty to all charges.

On February 13, 2026, Thompson was sentenced to five consecutive sentences of life in prison without the possibility for parole, and was transferred to Central Prison afterward, also in Raleigh, where he is currently serving his sentence.

== Reactions ==
Two commemorative vigils were held in the Hedingham area on October 15. U.S. President Joe Biden said he and his wife Jill were grieving with the victims' families. North Carolina Governor Roy Cooper said that the pain the victims' families were experiencing was unimaginable and that changes must be made to prevent similar tragedies. He later announced that flags would be flown at half-staff to honor the victims. Mayor Mary-Ann Baldwin said the residents of Raleigh needed to come together, adding, "We need to support those in our community who have suffered a terrible loss, a loss of a loved one." Additionally, several other state senators and representatives spoke about the shooting.

== See also ==
- List of mass shootings in the United States in 2022
- Gun violence in the United States
