= Herman Ashworth =

American murderer (1973–2005)

Herman Dale Ashworth
- Born: February 26, 1973; New Orleans, Louisiana, U.S.
- Died: September 27, 2005 (aged 32); Southern Ohio Correctional Facility, Ohio, U.S.
- Status: Executed by lethal injection
- Convictions: Aggravated murder, Aggravated robbery, Assault
- Penalty: Death

Herman Dale Ashworth (February 26, 1973 – September 27, 2005) was an American murderer who was executed by the U.S. state of Ohio. He admitted to committing aggravated murder and aggravated robbery in the death of Daniel L. Baker on September 10, 1996. Ashworth was executed by lethal injection at the Southern Ohio Correctional Facility after spending 8 years, three months, and 11 days on death row.

Ashworth and Baker first met at the Wagon Wheel, a bar in Newark, Ohio. They later went to another bar, and while returning to the Wagon Wheel at around 9 p.m., Ashworth led Baker into an alley where he brutally assaulted him with his fists, feet, and a 6-foot board. Ashworth claimed that Baker had made unwanted sexual advances towards him. Ashworth stole $40 and three credit cards from Baker's wallet and returned to the Wagon Wheel. Later, he took his then-girlfriend, Tanna Brett, to the alley and discovered that Baker was still alive. Ashworth left, saying he would ensure Baker could not identify him, while Brett returned to the alley and found Baker's body near a metal loading dock door. A deputy-coroner later testified that Baker's injuries were consistent with those caused by a high-speed traffic accident or plane crash.

Baker's body was found at 3:45 a.m. by a couple walking their dog. Thirty minutes later, Ashworth made an anonymous 9-1-1 call to inform the police of the beating. The call was traced, leading to Ashworth's arrest.

At his trial, Ashworth pleaded guilty and waived his right to present mitigating evidence. His defense lawyer did not cross-examine any witnesses. In May 2005, he dismissed his lawyers who were attempting to save his life. On August 31, 2005, Ashworth refused to appear before a hearing of the Ohio Parole Board, which subsequently recommended his execution. Ohio Governor Bob Taft issued a statement on September 23, denying clemency. Ashworth became the fourth Ohio prisoner to voluntarily drop his appeals since capital punishment was reinstated in the state in 1999.

Due to Hurricane Rita, his adoptive parents were unable to visit him before the execution, as they had not planned to witness it. For his last meal, Ashworth ordered two cheeseburgers with lettuce and mayonnaise, French fries with ketchup, and drank one Dr Pepper and one Mountain Dew. It took ten minutes for prison medical technicians to insert the catheter into his arm. In his final statement, he said, "A life for a life, let it be done, and justice will be served." He was pronounced dead at 10:19 a.m. EST.

== See also ==
- Capital punishment in Ohio
- Capital punishment in the United States
- Gay panic defense
- List of people executed in Ohio
- List of people executed in the United States in 2005
- Volunteer (capital punishment)

Executions carried out in Ohio
Preceded by William Smith March 8, 2005	Herman Ashworth; September 27, 2005	Succeeded by Willie Williams October 25, 2005
Executions carried out in the United States
Preceded by John Peoples Jr. – Alabama September 22, 2005	Herman Ashworth – Ohio; September 27, 2005	Succeeded by Alan Matheney – Indiana September 28, 2005
