= Otto Wood =

American desperado

Otto Wood (1894 – December 31, 1930) was a Depression-era desperado, born in Wilkes County, North Carolina in 1894. He began his life of crime at an early age, stealing a bicycle from a boy in North Wilkesboro, North Carolina. He was quickly caught and spent time in the Wilkes County Jail. He was subsequently sentenced to serve on a chain gang, but the foreman sent him home to his mother due to his age.

Wood hopped his first train when he was seven, travelling to stay with relatives in West Virginia. There, his kinfolk (the McCoy-feuding Hatfields) taught him how to gamble, make illegal whiskey, and fight.

He suffered from a foot ailment due to a birth defect, and lost his left hand when he was a teenager. According to some reports, he lost his hand in an accident while working for the railroad in West Virginia. Another story, told by relatives, is that the injury occurred while Wood was hunting.

Repeated distasteful encounters with the law, mostly involving thefts and bootlegging, led to numerous incarcerations in jails in North Carolina, Tennessee, Virginia and West Virginia. He is credited with a total of 10 jail breaks throughout his criminal career.

In 1923, Wood was charged with the murder of A.W. Kaplan, a Greensboro, North Carolina pawnbroker. He was convicted of second-degree murder and sentenced to serve 30 years in the Central Prison in Raleigh, North Carolina. After that conviction, Wood made four escapes from the state prison. During his time in that prison, Wood wrote an autobiography.

Following his last escape, Wood was spotted by police officers in North Carolina, on December 31, 1930. They approached Wood, then proceeded to kill him in the subsequent shootout.

A year after his death, the Carolina Buddies recorded the song "Otto Wood The Bandit" on Columbia Records.

Other musicians, including Doc Watson and Norman Blake, have recorded versions of the song. A stage play on Wood’s life is produced each June at The Record Park in North Wilkesboro, North Carolina.
