= Ronald Ray Howard =

American murderer executed by lethal injection (1973–2005)

- Born: July 22, 1973; Houston, Texas, U.S.
- Died: October 6, 2005 (aged 32); Huntsville Unit, Texas, U.S.
- Status: Executed by lethal injection
- Motive: Anti-police sentiment To avoid arrest
- Conviction: Capital murder
- Penalty: Death

Ronald Ray Howard (July 22, 1973 – October 6, 2005) was a convicted American murderer executed by lethal injection by the U.S. state of Texas. He was convicted of the shooting death of Texas Highway Patrol trooper Bill Davidson after Howard was stopped for a broken headlight on April 11, 1992.

== Life ==
Born in Houston, Texas, Howard dropped out of school in the 8th grade. By age 15, he was stealing cars and dealing drugs. He started, but never finished training in electrical tech, building maintenance, computer data entry, and heavy diesel mechanics. He was married with three daughters and one son.

Howard's prior criminal convictions were burglary of a motor vehicle (6-year probated sentence) and theft (45-day jail sentence). At the time of the crime, Howard was 18 years old and on probation.

== Crime ==
On April 11, 1992, Trooper Bill Davidson stopped Howard, originally from the South Park area of Houston, Texas, on U.S. Highway 59 about 5 miles (8 km) south of Edna, Texas in a 1986 GMC Jimmy with a broken headlight. When Davidson approached the driver-side window of the car, he was shot in the neck. Howard drove off but was apprehended later that night with a 9 mm pistol in his possession. The car was later found to be stolen. Three days later, Davidson died of his injuries. Drug tests showed that Howard had cocaine and cannabis in his system at the time of the murder.

Howard also said that the rap music that he listened to had conditioned him to hate police officers. He had been listening to 2Pac's "Soulja's Story" when pulled over. The song talks about the harsh life of a young black male being pulled over by a police officer and then shooting him.

== Sentencing ==
On June 8, 1993, Howard was convicted of capital murder and just over a month later sentenced to death. On December 18, 1996, however, the Texas Court of Criminal Appeals overturned the sentence (but not the conviction) because a prospective juror had been erroneously dismissed. The appeals court ordered a new punishment trial, which took place on January 26, 1999; the new trial again sentenced Howard to death. This new sentence was confirmed by the Court of Criminal Appeals on December 19, 2001. On March 30, 2005, after appealing to the Supreme Court of the United States, the Court of Appeals for the Fifth Circuit and the District Court for the Southern District of Texas his execution date was set as October 6.

According to the National Coalition to Abolish the Death Penalty, Howard continued to regret his actions and worked to stop at-risk youth following his lead.

== Death ==
Howard was executed by lethal injection on October 6, 2005, in Huntsville, Texas.

When asked by the warden if he had a final statement, he looked at the family of Davidson and said: "Yes sir, I do. To the victim's family, I hope it helps a little. I do not know how, but I hope it helps." He then looked at his family and friends and said: "I love you all, all of you. You know I love you. Thank you for bringing my children back to my life. Thank you. I love you all. I love you all very much. Thank you very much."

Howard was pronounced dead at 6:24 p.m.

== See also ==
- Capital punishment in Texas
- Capital punishment in the United States
- List of people executed in Texas, 2000–2009
- List of people executed in the United States in 2005
