= Henry Schwarzschild =

American lawyer (1925–1996)

Henry Schwarzschild (November 2, 1925 – June 1, 1996) was an activist for civil rights and human rights. He joined the Civil Rights Movement and became involved in the fight against capital punishment. He founded the National Coalition to Abolish the Death Penalty (NCADP), served as the executive director of the Lawyer's Constitutional Defense Committee from 1964 to 1970, and headed the American Civil Liberties Union's Capital Punishment Project from 1974 to 1990.

== Early life ==
Schwarzschild was born in Wiesbaden, Germany. At 13, he moved to New York City in 1939 with his parents, right before World War II. After serving in the army in the war as a member of the Counterintelligence Corps from 1944 to 1946, he went to the City College of New York, where he received a bachelor's degree and then did graduate work in political theory at Columbia University After serving in the army, it is said that he had the "appearance of a durable veteran from ancient wars, penetrating eyes intolerant of bombast and passivity, facial lines that mobilize easily to express by turns infectious good humor, remembered pain, resignation, impatience."

He married Kathleen Jett, and the couple had two daughters, Miriam and Hannah. In the 1950s, he worked as an executive of the International Rescue Committee, the American Committee for Cultural Freedom, and the Anti-Defamation League of B'nai B'rith.

== Work with civil rights ==
In 1960, he and his wife were in Lexington, Kentucky, and he overheard people talking about a sit-in at a lunch counter on the campus of Berea College. He decided to join in the sit-in and ended up being the only white person involved. It was the beginning of his fight for civil rights. Soon after he began his fight for black civil rights, he was arrested on June 21, 1961, in Jackson, Mississippi for his participation in the Freedom Rides. Once he was released, Martin Luther King Jr. wrote on his imprisonment forms, "your courageous willingness to go to jail for freedom has brought us closer to our nation's bright tomorrow." From that point on, he and King attended many events together, with both of them speaking and making movements towards civil rights. In 1961, Schwarzschild embarked on his own speaking tour across America to try to recruit people to their cause. He went on to make many public statements on civil liberties, capital punishment, racial justice, and many other issues.

In June 1964, he joined the Lawyers Constitutional Defense Committee as executive director following its formation the previous month. In the first year, he convinced 300 lawyers to take their vacation time and go down to the South to help with the cause of black civil rights.

== Work with capital punishment ==
In 1972, he was appointed to head up the ACLU's Capital Punishment Project. From 1972 to 1990, he worked as the leader of this project and fought to get legislation passed to help with the opposition to the death penalty. For the first five years, he ran the project completely on his own. Afterward, it finally began to get both funding and more volunteers into the program. He also worked to create the National Coalition for Universal and Unconditional Amnesty to pressure Gerald Ford to pardon those who had left the United States to avoid conscription.

In 1976, while he was still working with the Capital Punishment Project, he led the creation of the National Coalition to Abolish the Death Penalty (NCADP) in response to the Supreme Court decision Gregg v. Georgia, which permitted executions to resume in the United States. Schwarzschild organized it in New York and then transferred its headquarters to Washington, D.C., where he could do more with the legislation process. The NCADP consists of several dozen state and national affiliates, including Mainline Protestant groups and others. They created public policy campaigns and served as a resource for activists working to create change on a state by state basis.

== Opposition to Israel ==
Following the summer siege of Beirut in the 1982 Lebanon War by Israel, he wrote a public letter of resignation from the editorial advisory board of the journal Sh'ma:

I will not avoid an unambiguous response to the Israeli army's turning West Beirut into another Warsaw Ghetto. I now conclude and avow that the price of a Jewish state is, to me, Jewishly unacceptable and that the existence of this (or any similar) Jewish ethnic religious nation state is a Jewish, i.e. a human and moral, disaster and violates every remaining value for which Judaism and Jews might exist in history. The lethal military triumphalism and corrosive racism that inheres in the State and in its supporters (both there and here) are profoundly abhorrent to me. So is the message that now goes forth to the nations of the world that the Jewish people claim the right to impose a holocaust on others in order to preserve the State. I now renounce the State of Israel, disavow any political connection or emotional obligation to it, and declare myself its enemy.

In 2003, the letter was included in Wrestling with Zion: Progressive Jewish-American Responses to the Israeli-Palestinian Conflict, edited by Tony Kushner and Alisa Solomon.

In 1988, Schwarzschild testified before the Congressional Black Caucus as a member of the executive board of the Jewish Committee on the Middle East, saying, in part:

I and an increasing number of other American Jews are appalled at the spectacle of the State of Israel, which thinks of itself today as the contemporary incarnation of the Jewish people, having made another people into a dispersed nation; denying them national identity and self-determination; depriving them of their lands and water; suppressing their national, social, and cultural institutions; beating their children; killing unarmed civilians; exiling their leaders; imprisoning their spokespeople; destroying their homes; opening and closing the Occupied Territories as though they were the Jewish ghettos of the European Middle Ages ...

In these and other statements, Schwarzschild characterized the treatment of the Palestinian people by the State of Israel as inconsistent with, and at times directly in opposition to, Jewish tradition and values.

In 2003, an Orthodox Jewish American newspaper, The Jewish Press, created an annual "Henry Schwarzschild Award" for "a person in the public spotlight who, by his or her statements, displays contempt for the Jewish people, disregard for historical truth, a desire to sup at the table of Israel's enemies, or who otherwise plays into the hands of the enemies of Jews and Israel."

== Other activities ==
He stated that he "could not live in a period of major moral, social events and be a bystander." After retiring from the ACLU in 1990, he continued to work on Middle Eastern issues, and he remained the head of the New York office of the National Coalition to Abolish the Death Penalty.

Schwarzschild was opposed to the death penalty all of his life and stated that "he is an advocate not for murderers but against the death penalty" in Word and the Law. He believed they still deserved to suffer but not by death. He fought, with little success, for the support of national political figures.

Shortly before his death, he denounced the use of lethal injection in executions (NYSDA Defender News).

== Death ==
On June 1, 1996, Schwarzschild died of cancer at White Plains Hospital in White Plains, New York. He was 70 years old.

== Legacy ==
In 2000, Berea College added the special "Lincoln Center of Henry Schwarzschild" collection to its holdings. It included "printed works, government publications, and other contemporary pieces" donated by his wife, Kathleen, an alumnus of Berea. The annual Henry Schwarzschild Memorial Lecture began in 1999, sponsored by the NYCLU and the Hogarth Center for Social Action at Manhattan College. The lecturers focus on critical issues of "human rights and human dignity."
