= List of people executed in North Carolina =

The following is a list of people executed by the U.S. state of North Carolina since capital punishment was resumed in the United States in 1976.

There have been a total of 43 executions in North Carolina, under the current statute, since it was adopted in 1977. All of the people executed were convicted of murder. Of the 43 people executed, 42 were male and 1 was female. 41 were executed via lethal injection and 2 via gas chamber.

== List of people executed in North Carolina since 1976 ==
No.	Name	Race	Age	Sex	Date of execution	County	Method	Victim(s)	Governor
1	James William Hutchins	White	54	M	March 16, 1984	McDowell	Lethal injection	Roy Huskey, Owen Messersmith, and Pete Peterson (Note: Roy Huskey and Owen Messersmith were Rutherford County Deputy Sheriffs and Robert L. "Pete" Peterson was a North Carolina State Trooper.)	Jim Hunt
2	Margie Velma Barfield	White	52	F	November 2, 1984	Bladen	Lethal injection	Stuart Taylor	Jim Hunt
3	John William Rook	White	27	M	September 19, 1986	Wake	Lethal injection	Ann Marie Roche	James G. Martin
4	Michael Van McDougall	White	36	M	October 18, 1991	Mecklenburg	Lethal injection	Dianne Parker	James G. Martin
5	John Sterling Gardner Jr.	White	34	M	October 23, 1992	Forsyth	Lethal injection	Richard Adams and Kim Miller (Note: Gardner was also convicted of murdering Roy Shaver.)	James G. Martin
6	David Scarborough Lawson	White	38	M	June 15, 1994	Cabarrus	Gas chamber	Wayne Shinn	Jim Hunt
7	Kermit Smith Jr.	White	37	M	January 24, 1995	Halifax	Lethal injection	Whelette Collins	Jim Hunt
8	Phillip Lee Ingle	White	34	M	September 22, 1995	Rutherford	Lethal injection	4 murder victims (Note: The 4 victims were: William Fred Davis, Margaret Davis, E.Z. Willis, and Sarah Willis.)	Jim Hunt
9	Ricky Lee Sanderson	White	38	M	January 30, 1998	Iredell	Gas chamber (Note: This was the second-to-last execution by gas chamber to be carried out in the United States.)	Sue Ellen "Suzi" Holliman	Jim Hunt
10	Zane Brown Hill	White	62	M	August 14, 1998	Buncombe	Lethal injection	Randall Hill	Jim Hunt
11	John Thomas Noland Jr.	White	50	M	November 20, 1998	Mecklenburg	Lethal injection	Cindy Milton and Troy Milton	Jim Hunt
12	James David Rich	White	26	M	March 26, 1999	Greene	Lethal injection	Paul Gwyn	Jim Hunt
13	Harvey Lee Green	Black	38	M	September 24, 1999	Pitt	Lethal injection	Sheila Bland and Michael Edmondson	Jim Hunt
14	Arthur Martin Boyd Jr.	White	53	M	October 21, 1999	Surry	Lethal injection	Wanda Hartman	Jim Hunt
15	David Junior Brown	Black	51	M	November 19, 1999	Union	Lethal injection	Shelly Chalflinch and Christina Chalflinch	Jim Hunt
16	Michael Earl Sexton	Black	34	M	November 9, 2000	Wake	Lethal injection	Kimberly Crews	Jim Hunt
17	Willie Ervin Fisher	Black	39	M	March 9, 2001	Forsyth	Lethal injection	Angela Johnson	Mike Easley
18	Clifton Allen White	White	43	M	August 24, 2001	Mecklenburg	Lethal injection	Kimberly Ewing	Mike Easley
19	Ronald Wayne Frye	White	42	M	August 31, 2001	Catawba	Lethal injection	Ralph Childress	Mike Easley
20	David Junior Ward	Black	39	M	October 12, 2001	Pitt	Lethal injection	Dorothy Mae Smith	Mike Easley
21	John Hardy Rose	White	43	M	November 30, 2001	Haywood	Lethal injection	Patricia Stewart	Mike Easley
22	Ernest West Basden	White	49	M	December 6, 2002	Duplin	Lethal injection	Billy White	Mike Easley
23	Desmond Keith Carter	Black	35	M	December 10, 2002	Rockingham	Lethal injection	Helen Purdy	Mike Easley
24	William Quentin Jones	Black	34	M	August 22, 2003	Wake	Lethal injection	Edward Peebles	Mike Easley
25	Henry Lee Hunt	Native American	58	M	September 12, 2003	Robeson	Lethal injection	Larry Jones and Jackie Ransom	Mike Easley
26	Joseph Earl Bates	White	35	M	September 26, 2003	Yadkin	Lethal injection	Charles Jenkins	Mike Easley
27	Edward Ernest Hartman	White	39	M	October 3, 2003	Northampton	Lethal injection	Herman Larry Smith Sr.	Mike Easley
28	Joseph Timothy Keel	White	39	M	November 7, 2003	Edgecombe	Lethal injection	John Simmons	Mike Easley
29	John Dennis Daniels	Black	46	M	November 14, 2003	Mecklenburg	Lethal injection	Isabelle Daniels Crawford	Mike Easley
30	Robbie James Lyons	Black	31	M	December 5, 2003	Forsyth	Lethal injection	Stephen Stafford	Mike Easley
31	Raymond Dayle Rowsey	White	32	M	January 9, 2004	Alamance	Lethal injection	Howard Sikorski	Mike Easley
32	Sammy Crystal Perkins	Black	51	M	October 8, 2004	Pitt	Lethal injection	Lashenna Moore	Mike Easley
33	Charles Wesley Roache	White	30	M	October 22, 2004	Haywood	Lethal injection	6 murder victims (Note: The 6 victims were: Chad McKinley Watt, Earl Phillips, Cora Phillips, Eddie Phillips, Mitzi Phillips, and Katie Phillips.)	Mike Easley
34	Frank Ray Chandler	White	32	M	November 12, 2004	Surry	Lethal injection	Doris Poore	Mike Easley
35	William Dillard Powell	White	58	M	March 11, 2005	Cleveland	Lethal injection	Mary Gladden	Mike Easley
36	Earl J. Richmond Jr.	Black	43	M	May 6, 2005	Cumberland	Lethal injection	Helisa S. Hayes, Phillip Hayes, and Darien Hayes (Note: Richmond was also convicted of murdering Lisa Nadeau.)	Mike Easley
37	Steven Van McHone	White	35	M	November 11, 2005	Surry	Lethal injection	Mildred Adams and Wesley Adams Sr.	Mike Easley
38	Elias Hanna Syriani	Arab	67	M	November 18, 2005	Mecklenburg	Lethal injection	Teresa Yousef Syriani	Mike Easley
39	Kenneth Lee Boyd (Note: Kenneth Lee Boyd was the 1,000th person to be executed in the United States since the death penalty was reinstated in 1976.)	White	57	M	December 2, 2005	Rockingham	Lethal injection	Julie Curry Boyd and Thomas Dillard Curry	Mike Easley
40	Perrie Dyon Simpson	Black	43	M	January 20, 2006	Rockingham	Lethal injection	Jean Ernest Darter	Mike Easley
41	Patrick Lane Moody	White	39	M	March 17, 2006	Davidson	Lethal injection	Donnie Ray Robbins	Mike Easley
42	Willie Brown Jr.	Black	61	M	April 21, 2006	Martin	Lethal injection	Valerie Ann Roberson Dixon	Mike Easley
43	Samuel Russell Flippen	White	36	M	August 18, 2006	Forsyth	Lethal injection	Britnie Nichole Hutton	Mike Easley

== Demographics ==
Race
White	28	65%
Black	13	30%
Arab	1	2%
Native American	1	2%
Age
20–29	2	5%
30–39	22	51%
40–49	7	16%
50–59	9	21%
60–69	3	7%
Sex
Male	42	98%
Female	1	2%
Date of execution
1976–1979	0	0%
1980–1989	3	7%
1990–1999	12	28%
2000–2009	28	65%
2010–2019	0	0%
2020–2029	0	0%
Method
Lethal injection	41	95%
Gas chamber	2	5%
Governor (Party)
James Holshouser (R)	0	0%
Jim Hunt (D)	13	30%
James G. Martin (R)	3	7%
Mike Easley (D)	27	63%
Bev Perdue (D)	0	0%
Pat McCrory (R)	0	0%
Roy Cooper (D)	0	0%
Total	43	100%

== See also ==
- Capital punishment in North Carolina
- Capital punishment in the United States
- List of people executed in North Carolina (pre-1972) – executions before Furman
