= Luis L. Ramirez =

Luis L. Ramirez (June 19, 1963 – October 20, 2005) was executed by lethal injection in the U.S. state of Texas. He was convicted of hiring Edward Bell to kill the boyfriend of his former wife. He was the 15th person executed in Texas in 2005.

== Crime ==
Ramirez and his wife, Dawn, were divorced in 1995 and two years later she began dating Nemecio Nandin, a fireman and part-time repairman of washing machines and dryers. In early April 1998, Ramirez was seen meeting with Bell. Tim Hoogstra, a paid police informant, would later testify that Bell said he had been offered $1,000 to kill Nandin. Tim Hoogstra was paid $500 to give this evidence.

On April 8, 1998, Bell called Nandin and said that he needed someone to fix his washing machine. Once at the Miles, Texas home of Bell, Nandin was led to a chicken coop, where he was handcuffed and shot once in the head with a shotgun. He was then buried in a shallow grave. Bell later fled to Tyler, Texas. The body of Nandin was discovered about three weeks later after he was reported missing when he didn't turn up for work. Bell was arrested in Tyler. Business cards, maps, and hand-written notes linked him to Ramirez.

== Trial and appeals ==
Ramirez was indicted on June 4 for solicitation of capital murder. Almost a year later on May 7, 1999, he was found guilty. At the sentencing phase, Dawn Ramirez testified that while she was married to Luis, he got angry when she became pregnant, verbally abused her, physically abused her, raped her, isolated her from her parents. She said he continued to threaten her even after they separated. The state also presented evidence that Ramirez once slashed the tires of another man whom his ex-wife had dated, and that he had threatened one of her work acquaintances. Ramirez's first ex-wife also told the jury that he was physically abusive towards her and once destroyed her car in order to collect insurance money. Ramirez was sentenced to death on May 14. For his part in the crime, Bell was sentenced to life imprisonment. For the next six years his appeals to the Texas Court of Criminal Appeals, United States district courts, 5th Circuit Court of Appeals, and United States Supreme Court were denied. Ramirez was adamant up to his death of his innocence and said that there was no way he was involved in the crime. He said he was in Brady, Texas on the day of the murder. Hoogstra was also a self-admitted "daily drug abuser".

On 19 October 2005, the Texas Board of Pardons and Paroles denied a request to commute the sentence to life imprisonment. Further appeals to the United States Supreme Court were also denied. Although new evidence placed Luis Ramirez at a gas station in a different city at the time of the murder the Supreme Court denied him stating (in short) he was convicted for remuneration not for pulling the trigger.

== Execution ==
He was pronounced dead at 6:18 p.m. CDT on October 20, 2005, in the execution chamber at the Huntsville Unit. He made no last meal request.

== See also ==
- Capital punishment in Texas
- Capital punishment in the United States
- List of people executed in Texas, 2000–2009
- List of people executed in the United States in 2005
