= National Coalition to Abolish the Death Penalty =

US non-profit organization

The National Coalition to Abolish the Death Penalty (NCADP) is an organization dedicated to the abolition of the death penalty in the United States. Founded in 1976 (the same year the death penalty was reinstated by the Supreme Court of the United States) by Henry Schwarzschild, the NCADP is the only fully staffed nationwide organization in the United States dedicated to the total abolition of the death penalty. It also provides extensive information regarding imminent and past executions, death penalty defendants, numbers of people executed in the U.S., as well as a detailed breakdown of the current death row population, and a list of which U.S. state and federal jurisdictions use the death penalty.

== Objectives ==
Providing education and outreach to state and local affiliates is a key priority for the national office. NCADP works with state and local affiliates on campaign strategies, national and state specific reports on critical issues for policy makers, media support, networking and coalition building, technical assistance and training for volunteers. Additionally, NCADP holds annual conferences and training for staff and volunteers.

== Principles ==
NCADP is dedicated to the abolition of the death penalty. Below are some of the reasons the organization believes in this doctrine:

- Executions are carried out at a high cost to tax payers
- Capital punishment does not deter crime
- States cannot prevent execution of innocent people
- Race plays a role in who lives and dies
- Capital punishment is applied arbitrarily
- The United States keeps company with the top human rights abusers as a country that employs executions
- Poor legal representation is a persistent problem
- Life without parole is an appropriate alternative to capital punishment
- Capital punishment goes against almost every major religion
- Millions of dollars could be diverted to helping the families of murder victims

== Tactics ==
The NCADP uses a number of non-violent methods to draw attention to, and advance, their campaign at local, state and national levels:

- Promotion of anti-death penalty legislation and pressuring state legislators for abolition or moratorium bills through letter writing and campaigning.
- Using local and state media to disseminate information about the death penalty.
- Using their numerous links with like-minded organizations to speak and act against the death penalty.
- Networking with these organizations on campaigns.
- Hosting annual conferences to promote networking among members and like-minded organizations.
- Incorporating social networking sites to foster networking and facilitate coordination of activity in local communities.
- Focusing on the human rights violations which are widely thought to be inherent in the death penalty.
- Selling anti-death penalty clothing, bumper stickers, and pins to promote campaign ideals.

== Affiliate organizations ==
The Texas Coalition to Abolish the Death Penalty
The Texas Coalition to Abolish the Death Penalty (TCADP) is a grassroots Texas organization that works to end the death penalty. TCADP is an affiliate of the National Coalition to Abolish the Death Penalty and the World Coalition to Abolish the Death Penalty. TCADP is composed of human rights activists; death row prisoners and their families; crime victims and their families; persons working within the criminal justice system; and citizens in opposition to the death penalty.
New Mexico Coalition to Repeal the Death Penalty
The New Mexico Coalition to Repeal the Death Penalty (NM Repeal) was developed in 1997; it is a grassroots organization to abolish the death penalty. The main focus of the NM Repeal is to abolish the death penalty and replace it with the sentencing of life without the possibility of parole. The NM Repeal is founded on six principles: Victims' Families first, Innocence, Fairness, Cost, Deterrence, and International. These principles are the justification given to other people for education as to why individuals should support "repeal" of capital punishment. The organization educates the community on the effects of the death penalty on victims and their families, as well as on convicts and their families.
North Carolina Coalition for a Moratorium
The North Carolina coalition for a Moratorium (NC Moratorium) is based in Durham, North Carolina but works closely with the Western and Eastern areas of the state. The NC Moratorium hosts a campaign that is non-partisan, housing members that are Democrats and Republicans. The mission of the campaign is to abolish the Death penalty and to eliminate "the arbitrariness, racial disparities, hidden evidence and classist approach that has characterized NC's death penalty since its inception" as quoted on the North Carolina Coalition for a Moratoriums' official website. The campaign states that it needs a moratorium in North Carolina to temporarily suspend executions while the legislature reconstructs the Capital Punishment process. As of April 2008, North Carolina has put a hold on executions as the state legislature debates whether or not lethal injection is considered unconstitutional, how the act will be carried out, and whether a doctor should be present during a lethal injection procedure.
Project Hope to Abolish the Death Penalty
Project Hope to Abolish the Death Penalty (Project Hope) is an organization established in 1989 in the state of Alabama. It is a non-profit, non-denominational religious organization founded and operated by Death Row inmates. Project Hope strives to educate the public on the death penalty and to raise awareness to gain support for abolition of the death penalty in Alabama. Project Hope publishes a newsletter, Wings of Hope, four times a year. Articles are written by current inmates on death row. The publication is offered to the public, and it discusses the number of executions that has been committed in the State of Alabama or autobiographical stories of the inmates on death row. Project Hope uses Wings of Hope to educate the "outside" world on executions that occur in the state of Alabama. This organization has also taken strides to establish a moratorium in Alabama.
New Yorkers Against the Death Penalty
The New Yorkers Against the Death Penalty (NYADP) is a grassroots organization formed in 1992 that advocates through education to abolish capital punishment. It has local chapters in Albany, Buffalo, Ithaca, Long Island, Mid-Hudson, Nassau County, New York City, Rochester, Syracuse, and Westchester. In 2007, the NYADP was successful in gaining abolition of the death penalty by the state legislature. Most of the bill's supporters wanted to establish a sentence of life without parole as the alternative. The NYADP has stated that they have revamped their mission statement to bring together victims, law enforcement, advocates for the mentally ill, restorative justice practitioners, and families of the incarcerated, around policies that address needs and reduce the likelihood of violent crime.
Washington Coalition to Abolish the Death Penalty
The Washington Coalition to Abolish the Death Penalty (WCADP) aspires to abolish the death penalty by educating, advocating, and informing the public as well as political leaders. WCADP publishes newsletters, supports Washington's death row inmates, organizes activities that are anti-death penalty, and works with the media to gain coverage on the cause.
Missourians to Abolish the Death Penalty
The Missourians to Abolish the Death Penalty (MADP) was founded in 1987 to oppose the death penalty in the state. It has chapters in Kansas City, Springfield, St. Louis and Columbia, twenty-one affiliate groups, and individuals across the state who support abolition of the death penalty. The coalition organizes opposition to the death penalty, works with state legislators to pass a moratorium, educates state residents, monitors events pertaining capital punishment, advocates alternatives other than death as punishment for crimes; and supports death row prisoners, victims and their family members as well as others affected by the action of death penalty.

== Recent accomplishments ==
=== Ending the death penalty for juveniles ===
With its "Stop Killing the Kids Campaign", NCADP played a paramount role in the abolition of the death penalty for juveniles in the United States. The campaign encouraged NCADP staff to work with citizens in South Dakota and Wyoming to pass measures to ban the death penalty for crimes committed by those under the age of 18. Additionally, the victories in South Dakota and Wyoming added to evidence for the Supreme Court to rule that the death penalty for juvenile offenders violated the Eighth Amendment of the Constitution.

=== Fighting reinstatement efforts ===
A Wisconsin ballot initiative attempted to revive the death penalty after more than 100 years; however, after NCADP's successful campaigning with local activists, the initiative was defeated.

== Funding and expenses ==
Funding for NCADP mostly comes from voluntary contributions made to the organization while the least amount of money comes from membership dues. The greatest expenses NCADP spends their money on is for program expenses to promote their campaigns.

== See also ==
- Helen Prejean - a leading U.S. anti-death penalty campaigner and former chair of the NCADP.
- Hugo Adam Bedau - one of the NCADP's founding members; was Austin B. Fletcher Professor of Philosophy at Tufts University.
