= Central Prison =

Prison in Raleigh, North Carolina, US

Coordinates: 35°46′34″N 78°39′24″W

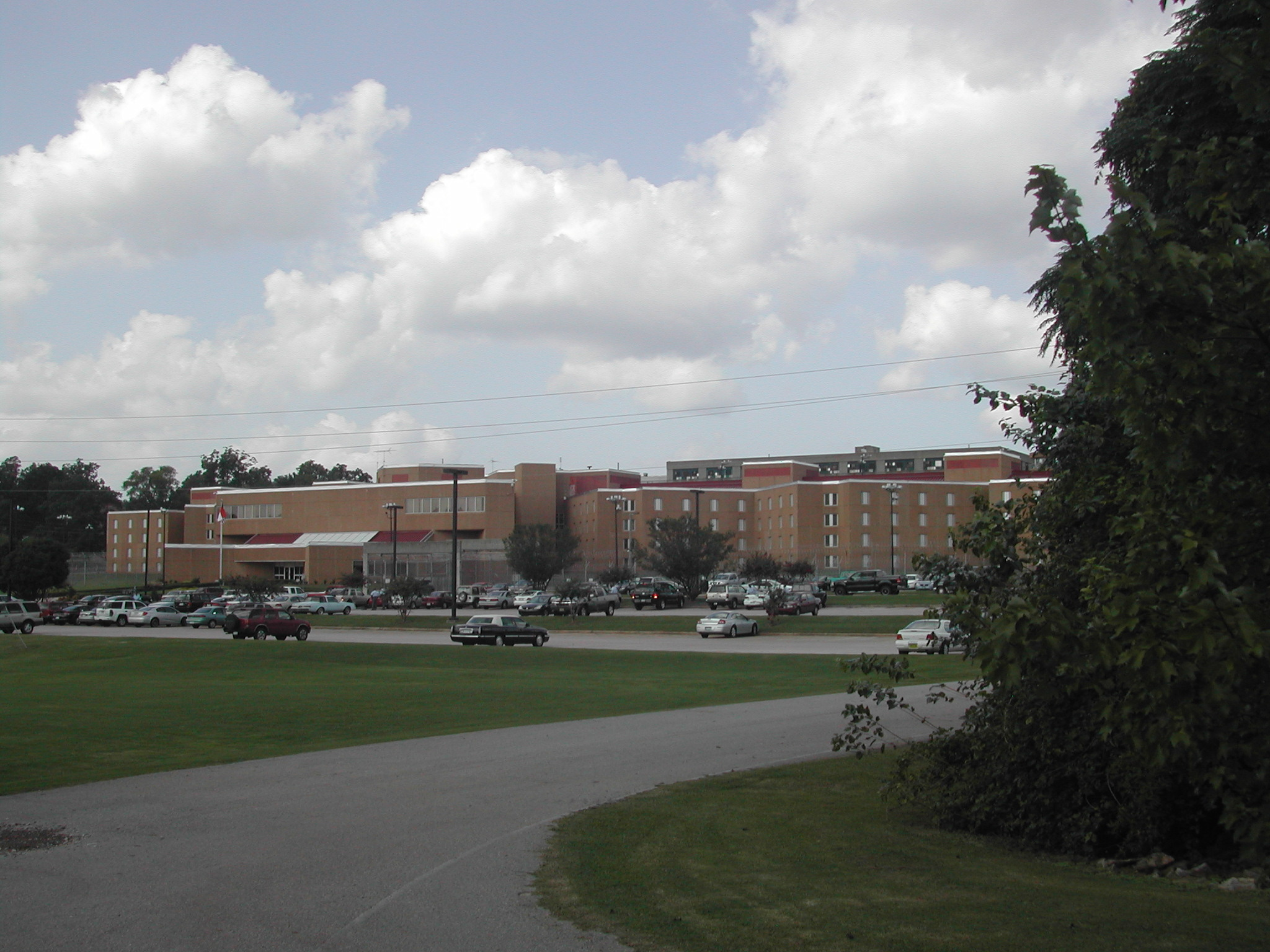
- Central Prison, 2006
- Interactive map of Central Prison
- Location: 1300 Western Blvd, Raleigh, North Carolina
- Security class: Minimum, Medium, Close
- Capacity: 1104
- Opened: December 1884
- Managed by: North Carolina Department of Public Safety
- Warden: Jamel James

Central Prison is a prison operated by the North Carolina Department of Adult Correction in Raleigh, North Carolina. The prison, west of Downtown Raleigh, is on 29 acres (12 ha) of land and is bounded by a double wire fence with a razor ribbon on top. The Department of Public Safety website describes the original building as "castle-like."

== History ==
Seal of the North Carolina Department of Correction

Funding for the Central Prison was authorized during the Reconstruction era by the North Carolina General Assembly of 1868–1869. Inmates built the prison for 14 years, and granite quarried from an area outside of what would become the east wall of the prison was used to build the facility. The prison's construction was completed in December 1884; the prison, built for $1.25 million, was the first prison in North Carolina. A three-story prison industries building, housing the state license plate fabrication shop and a complete print shop, was built in the 1940s. An acute care infirmary hospital with wards for 86 patients, operating rooms, X-ray laboratories, and a pharmacy opened in the 1960s. Two mental health wings with 144 single-bed rooms opened in the 1970s. The state placed the prison under extensive renovations in the 1980s. The first phase had a price of $28.8 million. The first phase included a custody control and administration building, a maximum security housing building with 384 single cells, a central services building, and central plant utility systems. The $8.6 million second phase included a three-story working resident building, which had 192 single cells for inmates assigned to jobs within the boundaries of the prison.

== Location ==
It is adjacent to Governor Morehead School, a state-operated school for the blind.

== Notable prisoners ==
=== Death row ===
Inmate Name	Register Number	Details
Henry Louis Wallace	0422350	Serial killer who murdered 11 women between 1990 and 1994.
Velma Barfield		American serial killer who was housed at Central Prison due to the lack of a women's death row unit in North Carolina at the time of her execution in 1984. Following her execution, a women's death row unit was established at the North Carolina Correctional Institution for Women.
Samuel Flippen		American convicted murderer. Executed on August 18, 2006. Currently the last person executed in North Carolina and at Central Prison.
James W. Hutchins		American convicted murderer. Executed on March 16, 1984. First person executed since 1976 in North Carolina and at Central Prison.

=== Non-death row ===
- Otto Wood – American depression-era desperado and serial prison escapee
- Trystan Andrew Terrell – University of North Carolina at Charlotte shooter
- Jeffrey Manchester – U.S. Army veteran and spree-robber. Known as "Roofman" for his peculiar method of robbery
- Austin Thompson, perpetrator in the 2022 Raleigh shootings

== See also ==
- List of North Carolina state prisons
