= Capital punishment in North Carolina =

Capital punishment is a legal penalty in the U.S. state of North Carolina.

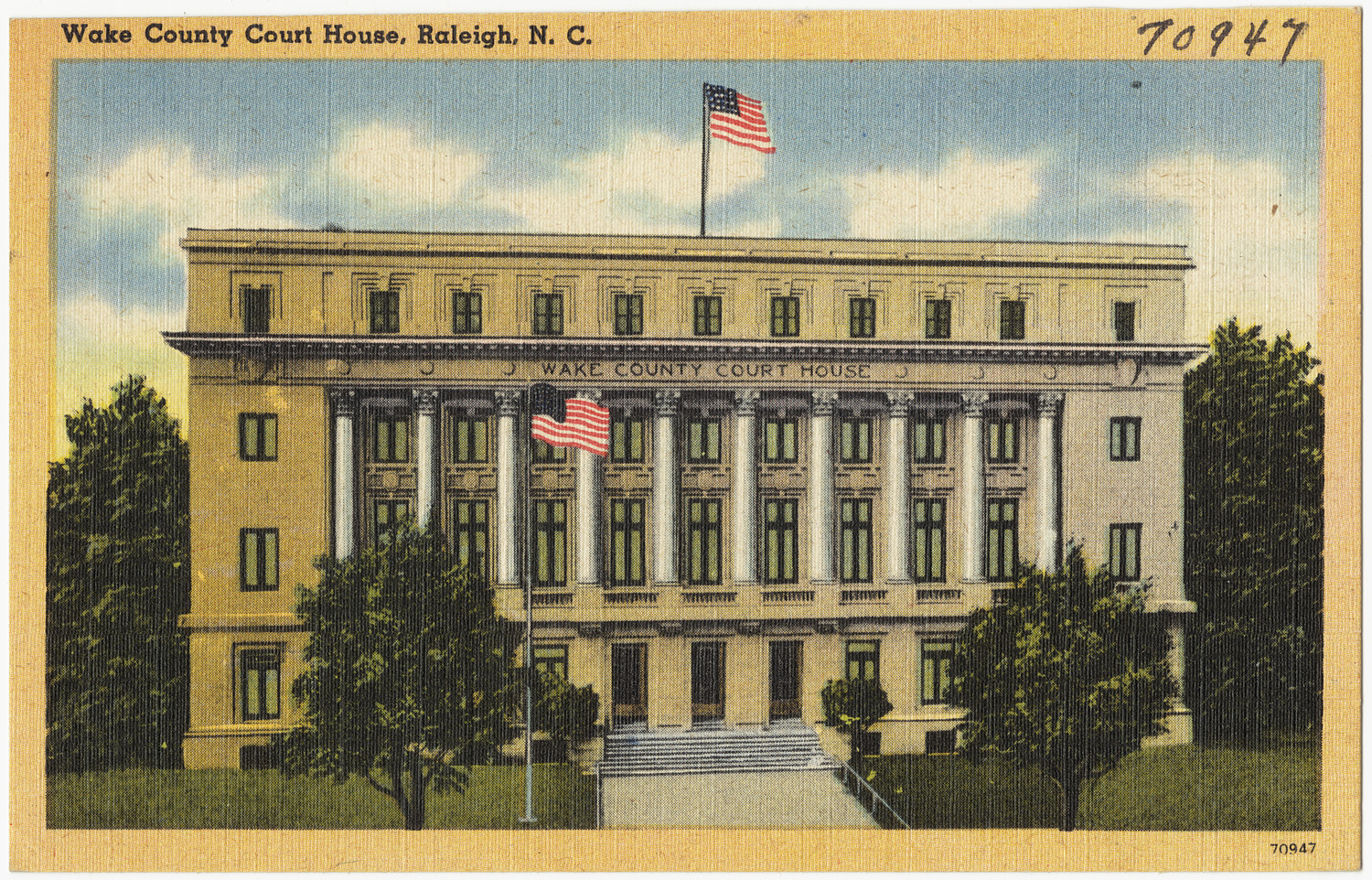
Wake County Court House

Despite remaining a legal penalty, there have been no executions in North Carolina since 2006. A series of lawsuits filed in state courts questioning the fairness and humanity of capital punishment have created a de facto moratorium on executions being carried out in North Carolina. The last person executed in the state is Samuel Flippen.

== Legal process ==
When the prosecution seeks the death penalty, the sentence is decided by the jury and must be unanimous. To avoid any racial bias in the decision, North Carolina created the Racial Justice Act and passed it in 2009.

In case of a hung jury during the penalty phase of the trial, a life sentence is issued, even if a single juror opposed death (there is no retrial).

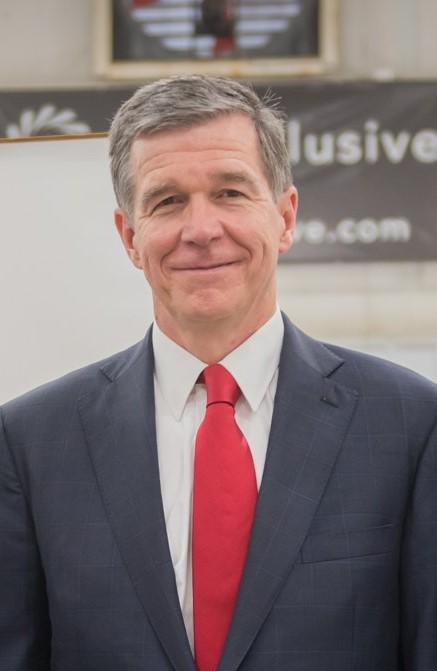
Former Governor Roy Cooper

The power of clemency belongs to the Governor of North Carolina. On December 31, 2024, outgoing Governor Roy Cooper granted clemency to 15 inmates on North Carolina's death row. Prior to those granted, North Carolina had over 120 offenders on death row. 89 of those cases petitioned for clemency, which were sent to the Governor's office to be reviewed.

The method of execution is lethal injection.

In April 2025, a bill was proposed to legalize both firing squad and the electric chair as alternative execution methods.

== Capital crimes ==
First-degree murder is punishable by death in North Carolina if it involves one of the following aggravating factors:

1. The capital felony was committed by a person lawfully incarcerated.
2. The defendant had been previously convicted of another capital felony.
3. The defendant had been previously convicted of a felony involving the use or threat of violence to the person.
4. The capital felony was committed for the purpose of avoiding or preventing a lawful arrest or effecting an escape from custody.
5. The capital felony was committed while the defendant was engaged, or was an aider or abettor, in the commission of, or an attempt to commit, or flight after committing or attempting to commit, any homicide, robbery, rape or a sex offense, arson, burglary, kidnapping, or aircraft piracy or the unlawful throwing, placing, or discharging of a destructive device or bomb.
6. The capital felony was committed for pecuniary gain.
7. The capital felony was committed to disrupt or hinder the lawful exercise of any governmental function or the enforcement of laws.
8. The capital felony was committed against a law-enforcement officer, employee of the Division of Adult Correction of the Department of Public Safety, jailer, fireman, judge or justice, former judge or justice, prosecutor or former prosecutor, juror or former juror, or witness or former witness against the defendant, while engaged in the performance of his official duties or because of the exercise of his official duty.
9. The capital felony was especially heinous, atrocious, or cruel.
10. The defendant knowingly created a great risk of death to more than one person by means of a weapon or device which would normally be hazardous to the lives of more than one person.
11. The murder for which the defendant stands convicted was part of a course of conduct in which the defendant engaged and which included the commission by the defendant of other crimes of violence against another person or persons.

== Death row ==
Death row for males is located at the Central Prison. Female death row prisoners are housed at the North Carolina Correctional Institution for Women. Both prisons are located in Raleigh.

== History of Capital Punishment in North Carolina ==
Before the state took over the administration of the death penalty, local governments had the power to execute individuals for their crimes. Public hangings were a common punishment used. In 1910, North Carolina assumed the power for execution.

Walter Morrison, became the first person to receive capital punishment via the electric chair at the Central Prison in Raleigh on March 18, 1910. Morrison was sentenced to death for rape. In 1936, a new form of execution was used, the gas chamber. Allen Foster became the first incarcerated individual to be put to death by the gas chamber on January 24,1936 in North Carolina.

In 1983, North Carolina allowed the incarcerated individuals to choose between lethal injection and the gas chamber. By 1998, the main method of execution became lethal injection. During this time, both North and South Carolina, as well as other states, were unable to obtain drugs from pharmaceutical companies necessary for lethal injection due to the companies fear of retaliation and protests from anti-death penalty advocates.

While lethal injection drugs became more difficult to obtain, other forms of execution became legally possible, such as the electric chair and firing squad.

== Legal Developments and Racial Disparities ==
The modern death penalty system in North Carolina changed significantly following major court decisions in the 1970s. In 1972, the United States Supreme Court ruled in Furman v. Georgia that existing death penalty laws were unconstitutional because they allowed the death penalty to be applied in an arbitrary manner.

North Carolina responded by creating a mandatory death penalty law, but the Supreme Court later rejected this approach in Woodson v. North Carolina in 1976. The Court found that automatically imposing the death penalty did not allow enough consideration of the individual circumstances of each case. In response, North Carolina adopted a new law in 1977 that created separate stages for deciding guilt and punishment. During the punishment stage, juries could consider aggravating circumstances that supported a death sentence and mitigating circumstances that could support a lesser punishment.

Further changes took place over the following decades. In 1994, North Carolina established life imprisonment without parole as the only alternative to the death penalty in capital cases. In 1998, lethal injection became the state's exclusive method of execution. In 2001, prosecutors gained the ability to decide not to seek the death penalty in individual cases, and the state prohibited the execution of people with intellectual disabilities.

In 2005, the United States Supreme Court ruled in Roper v. Simmons that the death penalty could not be imposed for crimes committed by people under the age of 18. These changes shaped how North Carolina handled capital cases and placed limits on when the death penalty could be imposed.

The Racial Justice Act of 2009 was another important development because it directly addressed concerns about racial bias in capital cases. The law allowed defendants to present statistical evidence showing that race played a role in the decision to seek or impose the death penalty. This evidence could involve the race of the defendant, the race of the victim, or patterns in the selection of jurors. The law was significant because it allowed racial discrimination to be examined through patterns across multiple cases, rather than only through evidence about one individual decision.

A 2011 study by researchers Michael L. Radelet and Glenn L. Pierce further examined racial disparities in North Carolina's death penalty system. The researchers analyzed 15,281 homicide cases from 1980 to 2007 to determine whether the race of the defendant or victim affected the likelihood of receiving a death sentence. Their findings showed that cases involving White victims were more likely to result in a death sentence than cases involving Black victims, even when the seriousness of the crime was considered.

After accounting for legally relevant factors, such as the number of victims and other felonies committed during the crime, the researchers found that the odds of receiving a death sentence were approximately three times higher when the victim was White. The study also found that the defendant's race was not significantly associated with death sentencing after these factors were considered. These findings added to existing concerns about racial inequality in North Carolina's criminal justice system and supported efforts to address potential racial bias through the Racial Justice Act.

Research on North Carolina's death penalty system had documented racial disparities in executions and concerns about the exclusion of Black prospective jurors. Together, these historical patterns and legal changes demonstrate how questions about fairness, jury selection, and equal treatment have influenced debates over capital punishment in North Carolina.

== Trends in North Carolina's Legal System ==
- One trend that has been seen, is an increase in life without parole sentences, while the rates of death penalty sentences have declined. Life without parole (LWOP) has become more a default for the maximum sentencing for more serious crimes. As of 2025, there are around 200,000 inmates serving LWOP sentences in the United States. In North Carolina, there were around 3,940 inmates serving LWOP in 2024. While rates are increasing for LWOP sentences, death penalty punishments have been on a decline. Since 2001, the size of death row has been decreasing every year in the United States. As of 2025, there are about 2,100 inmates on death row, which in 2023 there were 2,241.

== See also ==
- List of people executed in North Carolina
- List of people executed in North Carolina (pre-1972)
- List of death row inmates in the United States § North Carolina
- Crime in North Carolina
- Law of North Carolina
