= Scott Williams (serial killer) =

American serial killer

Scott Wilson Williams
- NC DPS mug shot
- Born: Scott Wilson Williams; December 3, 1963; Monroe, North Carolina, U.S.
- Died: August 6, 2022 (aged 58); North Carolina, U.S.
- Convictions: First degree murder (3 counts); Attempted first degree murder; First degree kidnapping (5 counts); First degree rape; First degree forcible sexual offense; Robbery with a dangerous weapon
- Penalty: Life imprisonment without parole

Details
- Victims: 3
- Span of crimes: 1997–2006
- Country: United States
- State: North Carolina
- Date apprehended: March 9, 2006

Scott Wilson Williams (December 3, 1963 – August 6, 2022) was a convicted American serial killer who lived in Monroe, North Carolina. He had been convicted for the murders of three women that took place over a period of nine years. He had also been convicted of crimes against two additional women who were not killed.

== Murders ==
- Sharon House Pressley, 37, from Charlotte, North Carolina, in 1997.
- Christina Outz Parker, 34, from Monroe, North Carolina, in 2004.
- Sharon Tucker Stone, 46, from Monroe, North Carolina, in 2006.

== Investigation, trial and sentence ==
Sharon Stone's remains were discovered by a man picking up cans. Williams was an employee of the North Carolina Department of Transportation and had no prior criminal record. Nothing initially drew the attention of law enforcement to him. A comment was made by an investigator that "He's lived a normal life, except on those three or four occasions."

In connection with the Stone murder, Williams was identified as an acquaintance. Ultimately this led to his arrest on March 9, 2006, at 1:30 AM. All three victims had been shot in the head and suffered similar forms of mutilation. During the course of the interviews, law enforcement found that he also knew Parker and Pressley. It was learned that Parker and Stone knew each other.

The cases were investigated by the Union County—Chesterfield County (South Carolina) Homicide Task Force, South Carolina State Law Enforcement Division, the North Carolina State Bureau of Investigation, and the FBI. Evidence against Williams included DNA, ballistics, witness identification from victims that survived, and incriminating statements by Williams himself.

On July 18, 2008, Williams, who faced execution for the three charges of first degree murder, entered Alford pleas to the murder charges pursuant to a negotiated plea, and was sentenced to three consecutive terms of life without parole. In addition, Williams entered Alford pleas to charges of first-degree kidnapping, rape, and sexual offenses against two other women in 1995 and 2000. Williams was represented by Franklin Wells and Jonathan Megerian of Asheboro, North Carolina.

Williams was imprisoned at Alexander Correctional Institution. He died in prison on August 6, 2022.

== See also ==
- List of serial killers in the United States
