= Lanesboro Correctional Institution =

State prison in North Carolina

Coordinates: 34°59′11″N 80°10′54″W

Anson Correctional Institution
- Interactive map of Anson Correctional Institution
- Location: 552 Prison Camp Road Polkton, North Carolina
- Status: Operational
- Security class: Medium and Close Security
- Capacity: 1800
- Opened: 2004
- Managed by: North Carolina Department of Correction

Lanesboro Correctional Institution was a state men's prison in Polkton, North Carolina, that first opened in January, 2004 and operated by the North Carolina Department of Public Safety Adult Corrections. As one of the state's four largest prisons, the official capacity was 1,800 prisoners. The facility housed medium- and close-security inmates.

As of March 2012 Lanesboro was one of six state prisons put on lockdown to squelch gang fights and coordinated gang activity.

As of May 2016, state corrections officials announced that the Lanesboro facility would be merged with the adjacent Brown Creek Correctional Institution, which is to be converted from medium to minimum security. The move is meant to address staffing challenges and the "checkered pasts" of both facilities.

== Notable inmates ==
- Robert Stewart (born 1963), mass murderer; perpetrator of the 2009 Carthage nursing home shooting

== See also ==
- List of North Carolina state prisons
