= Bertie Correctional Institution =

Men's prison in North Carolina, US

Coordinates: 35°59′53″N 76°56′56″W

- Interactive map of Bertie Correctional Institution
- Location: 218 Cooper Hill Road Windsor, North Carolina
- Status: open
- Security class: close
- Capacity: 1400
- Opened: 2006
- Managed by: North Carolina Department of Public Safety

Bertie Correctional Institution is a state men's prison in Windsor, North Carolina, first opened in August 2006, and operated by the North Carolina Department of Public Safety. As one of the state's four largest prisons, the official capacity is 1,400 prisoners, all held in Close Custody. The site is near the Cashie River.

As of March 2012 Bertie was one of six state prisons put on lockdown to squelch gang fights and coordinated gang activity.

In May 2015 an excessive-force lawsuit brought by a Bertie inmate, Sammy Ussery, reached the United States Court of Appeals for the Fourth Circuit. The court held that the officers' claim of qualified immunity did not entitle them to a summary judgment.

== See also ==
- List of North Carolina state prisons
