= Tabor City Correctional Institution =

Prison in Tabor City, North Carolina, United States

Coordinates: 34°11′15″N 78°54′47″W

Tabor Correctional Institution
- Interactive map of Tabor Correctional Institution
- Location: 4600 Swamp Fox Hwy W Tabor City, North Carolina
- Status: Open
- Security class: Mixed
- Capacity: 1700
- Opened: 2008
- Managed by: North Carolina Department of Correction
- Warden: Jamie Bullard

The Tabor Correctional Institution, also known as Tabor City Prison, is a prison within the North Carolina Department of Public Safety located in Tabor City, North Carolina. It houses over 1700 mixed classification inmates. The prison opened in 2008. The prison is located at 4600 West Swamp Fox Highway.

== Construction ==
Due to a backlog in counties jails and crowding in other North Carolina state prisons, the state of North Carolina began construction on Tabor Correctional Institution (TCI) in May 2006 and was completed in April 2008. Backlog refers to the housing of inmates in county jails as the prison system has insufficient space to house the inmates. The state must pay a fee to the counties to house these inmates. "After the decision was made to locate the prisons in Tabor City, the town had to fight the battle of paying for the land (and giving the land to the state) and we (Tabor City) had to fight the battle of raising the millions of dollars in grants that it took to service the prisons with water and sewer"

The design of Tabor Correctional is the same as six other North Carolina prisons. Sundland Fire also participated in the construction of the prison, as did Bergelectric

TCI is located two miles (3 km) northwest from the center of Tabor City, although it is considered a part of the city limits. A double fence surrounds the prison.

The prison is a mixed classification facility, resulting in inmates classified, originally, from medium to maximum control levels being housed within, with minimum custody inmates added in the 2014 addition.

The cost to build the prison was approximately $94 million, although the use of inmate labor greatly reduced what this amount would have been if private contractors had been used. .

Early in 2014, an addition housing 252 minimum inmates opened, raising the maximum number of inmates housed at Tabor Prison to 1,752.

== Operation ==
Before its official opening, the prison was used in various training exercises. Drills included escaped inmates and staff being taken hostage.

It cost approximately $28 million to operate this prison each year TCI is maintained by contract maintenance, TKC Management Services.

As a part of the North Carolina Department of Public Safety Division of Prisons, it opened in 2008, and housed, as of January 2016, a maximum of 1,402 inmates, providing over 500 jobs to the economically depressed area. The original maximum number of inmates housed at the prison was 1,500. In June 2014, a separate facility was added to the prison complex, housing an additional 252 minimum custody level inmates making it one of the largest prisons in the state.

North Carolina Prison guards are paid at the lower end of the national scale, although North Carolina Governor Pat McCrory proposed in April 2015 significant increases in officer pay, although the raise may be partially based on the custody level of the prison.

In May 2014 TCI was visited by high ranking Panama officials to review the operation of the prison. The visit was also covered by the Tabor-Loris Tribune.

== History ==
=== George Kenworthy era (2008-2012) ===
The Tabor City Prison officially opened on August 18, 2008, with George Kenworthy serving as administrator of the prison. Kenworthy had been named as Administrator prior to the prison's opening on June 29, 2007.

Inmates were charged with assaulting officers on more than one occasion. Inmates were found guilty of additional charges due to these assaults.

During this time. a case of possible exposure of tuberculosis was reported, although later testing proved negative. When this possible health issue was reported, Mr. Kenworthy stated, "If something of that nature did occur and it was determined that some of our other population was exposed, necessary actions would be taken to provide those inmates with the appropriate testing and/or medical treatment that would ensure their well-being as well as the staff here."

Some negative publicity was reported during this period by officers during this period were charged with committing theft, and, in an unrelated case, a different officer was charged with dealing drugs, although not in the prison.

=== Patsy Chavis era (February 22, 2012 - June 30, 2015) ===
Once Kenworthy, first hired in 1982 as a corrections officer retired after a long career with the North Carolina Department of Corrections, numerous controversies under the new leadership were reported. The new administrator, Patsy Chavis, was appointed to the post on February 22, 2012, despite having no experience as a custody officer in her official NCDPS biography. During this administrator's time, the small annex housing up to 252 minimum security inmates was opened. During the construction of the new addition to the prison, cell phones and marijuana were found during the construction of the addition, apparently in an effort to smuggle the items into the prison.

In October 2012, a correctional officer was arrested in the parking lot of Tabor Correction Institute, according to Tabor City Police, and charged with one count of providing tobacco to an inmate and two counts of a sex offense in an institution.

As reported by WECT in February 2014, the new Administrator was accused of forcing employees to pay the new Administrator for promotions through an Administrator-designed "fundraising" campaign. According to WECT, "still, an October e-mail sent by Prison Administrator Patsy Chavis to staff reads, "We cannot require anyone to pay...however supervisors need to be encouraged to participate... Please let me know if you encounter any resistance or unwillingness to pay.". After an internal investigation lasting only a few weeks, the state found no "wrongdoing" in the fundraising effort, but halted the program, until "state prison administrators and auditors can develop formal policy guidelines for employee fundraising activities.".

Another issue, faced under the new Administrator's term in February 2014, was the death of a 39-year-old inmate, in which an autopsy was needed to determine the cause of death. The cause of death was reported as having been natural causes, however, a WECT report dated July 30, 2015 revealed that the cause of death was "methanol toxicity" from a concoction of chemicals including hand sanitizer that the inmate drank. According to the same news report, the department of public safety conducted an investigation, "but the results aren't public record."

In September 2014, local news channel WECT discovered that this administrator of the prison had approved using state employees and state vehicles to have fast food delivered to the prison inmates on several occasion. While the inmates paid for the food, state resources were used to deliver these meals. Upon the airing of the story, the Director of the North Carolina Division of Prisons suspended these activities, pending yet another review stating, "The Division of Prisons is surveying the activities of all service clubs across the prison system and developing more specific governing policies for these clubs to ensure that they are operating consistently and are providing true rehabilitative benefits." As of September 2014, this employee delivered fast food program remained suspended by the Director of the State Prison System.

In late October 2014, according reports from the Raleigh News and Observer in which the maintenance department of the prison head met with Governor Pat McCrory to extend the maintenance contracts beyond their expiration dates. Despite the objections of the NCDPS head Frank Perry, the contracts were renewed. The FBI was conducting an ongoing investigation into the incident as of November 2015.

WECT reported that in late November 2014 a prison guard was arrested by the FBI for conspiring to rob an armored vehicle. The officer had previously worked for the armored car company and was planning to behead the owners to make the robbery appear to be an act of terrorism. The officer was also planning to break into several houses to obtain weapons for the planned robbery. The officer was indicted by a federal grand jury.

Also in November 2014. yet another officer was arrested for providing drugs to the inmates. The officer was arrested by the Tabor City police department.

Soon after, late December 2014, the same news outlet reported that an officer who had been indicted by a grand jury on charges of felony conspiracy to bring contraband into a detention facility, accepting bribes; furnishing controlled substances to inmates; and furnishing tobacco products to inmates was still being allowed to work at the prison by officials, albeit in an "appropriately reassigned" position. An investigation into the officer was ongoing at the time of the news report, although Department of Corrections Spokesman Keith Acree said "Most often when employees are caught doing this and charged, they resign," Acree was unable to say how many employees resigned after being charged with drug offenses, although the news report reference two other recent issues with prison employees.

In April 2015, a WECT expose showed why five officers had been terminated and also announced the retirement of Chavez. It revealed that guards at the prison had been fired for unnecessary uses of force against an inmate, an officer having an inappropriate relationship with an inmate, for unsatisfactory job performance and sleeping while on duty, falsification of doctors' notes and being arrested and charged with first degree burglary. It also revealed this administrator submitted a resignation effective June 30, 2015.

In June 2015, the Tabor-Loris Tribune reported that an officer was being investigated striking a person in the road. During the same month, WECT reported that an officer was charged, while on duty, with stealing over $30,000 in property and cash from an employee at the UNC Hospital's Ambulatory Care Center. The incident resulted in an "active shooter" announcement being broadcast over the hospital's public address system. WECT later reported this officer had been convicted of larceny a year before the prison hired her. According to state law, correctional officers cannot have been convicted of misdemeanors for three years.

Later in June 2015, a Correctional Sergeant, from the prison was charged with multiple drug related offenses. Because of these charges, the sergeant resigned her position.

In addition, some commentators have included censorship as well as other deprivations as problems under this new leadership.

=== Brad Perritt era (January 2016 - ===
The first phase of the search for the replacement administrator began on 5/7/15. Assistant Superintendent Larry Thompson was named Acting Superintendent until the next Superintendent was selected.

The third administrator was named in January 2016, Brad Perritt. Perritt has a 21-year prison work history, most of which has been in corrections.

On December 8, 2016, an officer was arrested for "unlawfully, willfully, and feloniously" allowed the sexual abuse between her son and the alleged victim to occur."

On April 24, 2017 an officer was arrested, accused of having sex with an inmate.

In June 2017, an inmate assigned to a work detail at a second prison escaped.

As administrator, Brad Perrit was cited for failing to properly document use of a state vehicle.

In October 2019, a Corrections officer was accused of hitting two students with a car, while another was accused of breaking into a house.

== See also ==
- List of North Carolina state prisons
