= Neuse Correctional Institution =

State prison in North Carolina, US

Coordinates: 35.3876°N 78.0366°W

- Interactive map of Neuse Correctional Institution
- Location: 701 Stevens Mill Road Goldsboro, North Carolina
- Status: open
- Security class: minimum and medium security
- Capacity: 816
- Opened: 1994
- Managed by: North Carolina Department of Public Safety

Neuse Correctional Institution is a minimum and medium security state prison for men in the United States, operated by the State of North Carolina Department of Public Safety in Goldsboro in Wayne County, North Carolina.

Housing 816 prisoners, Neuse Correctional Institution received its first inmates on August 27, 1994. Neuse was built to replace Triangle Correctional Center in Raleigh as the eastern North Carolina processing center for adult male misdemeanants. The original 500-bed construction project was authorized in July 1992 with a budget of $10.6 million, and another 100-bed dormitory was added to the construction program in July 1993.

== Notable inmates ==
Notable criminals housed at the facility include:

| Inmate Name | Register Number | Status | Details |
|---|---|---|---|
| Robert Kenneth Stewart | 1142611 | Serving a 141-179 year sentence. | Perpetrator of the 2009 Carthage nursing home shooting in which he murdered 8 people at the care facility. |

- Crystal Mangum, American murderer responsible for making false rape allegations in the Duke lacrosse case

== See also ==
- List of North Carolina state prisons
