= Scotland Correctional Institution =

Men's prison in North Carolina

Coordinates: 34°48′43″N 79°21′49″W

- Interactive map of Scotland Correctional Institution
- Location: 22383 McGirts Bridge Road Laurinburg, North Carolina
- Status: Open
- Security class: Mixed
- Capacity: 1756
- Opened: 2003
- Managed by: North Carolina Department of Correction

Scotland Correctional Institution is a state men's prison in Laurinburg, North Carolina, first opened in 2003 and operated by the North Carolina Department of Correction. The stated capacity is 1,756 prisoners.

The facility opened in stages, first in September 2003 with a thousand-bed Close Custody unit, then another 500-capacity Medium Security unit in March 2011, then another 250-beds in July 2011 for Minimum Security.

As of March 2012 Scotland was one of six state prisons put on lockdown to squelch gang fights and coordinated gang activity. At Scotland, the last to resume normal operation, that lockdown had extended from January to March of that year. In 2014, an official DPS statement received by Solitary Watch indicated that another lockdown had extended from December 28, 2013 into September of the following year.

== See also ==
- List of North Carolina state prisons
