= Brown Creek Correctional Institution =

State men's prison in Polkton, North Carolina

Coordinates: 34°59′08″N 80°11′01″W

- Interactive map of Brown Creek Correctional Institution
- Location: 248 Prison Camp Road Polkton, North Carolina
- Status: open
- Security class: medium/minimum
- Capacity: 1204
- Opened: July 1993
- Managed by: North Carolina Department of Correction

Brown Creek Correctional Institution is a state men's prison in Polkton, North Carolina, United States, first opened in July 1993 and operated by the North Carolina Department of Correction.

Its official capacity is 1,204 inmates, one of the eight largest prisons in the state. From its opening through 2008, all prisoners were held in medium security; in December 2009, the facility was merged with the former Anson Correctional Center, which brought another three hundred Minimum Custody inmates.

As of May 2016, state corrections officials announced a further consolidation. The Brown Creek facility is to be merged with the adjacent Lanesboro Correctional Institution, resulting in a Minimum Custody prison. The move is meant to address staffing challenges and the "checkered pasts" of both facilities.

== See also ==
- List of North Carolina state prisons
