= James Opelton Bradley =

American serial killer

- Born: September 8, 1962 (age 64); North Carolina, U.S.
- Status: Incarcerated
- Convictions: First degree murder (2 counts); Second degree murder
- Penalty: Life imprisonment

Details
- Victims: 3
- Span of crimes: 1988–2014
- Country: United States
- State: North Carolina
- Imprisoned at: Tabor Correctional Institution

James Opelton Bradley (born September 8, 1962) is an American serial killer who murdered his stepdaughter in 1988 and two other women in North Carolina in 2013 and 2014.

== Early life ==
Bradley is a former Army Sergeant.

== First murder ==
In June 1988, Bradley reported that his 8-year-old stepdaughter, Ivy Gibson, had been kidnapped from her bus stop in Fayetteville, North Carolina. Police later determined he had staged the alleged crime to make it seem that there was a struggle beforehand. Bradley confessed to killing her two days later, saying he was sick at home when Gibson woke him up by making the television too loud. He said he snapped and choked the girl, wrapping a sock around her neck. After realizing Gibson was dead, Bradley attempted to cover up the crime by putting her body in a garbage bag and taking it to the local dump. On January 22, 1990, Bradley pleaded guilty to first degree murder for killing Gibson and was sentenced to life in prison. Because the crime occurred prior to the North Carolina Structured Sentencing Act, Bradley's sentence carried the possibility of parole.

While in prison, Bradley wrote two short stories, titled "The Beast Within" and "Serial Killer". In the books, he vividly described his characters brutally murdering women in sexually charged circumstances.

Bradley was released on parole on February 11, 2013.

== Subsequent murders and imprisonment ==
On April 5, 2014, Bradley killed 53-year-old Shannon Rippy Van Newkirk. Van Newkirk was killed the day before her 54th birthday. She was reported missing two days later. On April 15, after checking traffic camera footage, police searched Bradley's apartment, phone records, and truck. Bradley, who changed his story several times, said Van Newkirk was with him in his truck, but they got into an argument, and she jumped out and ran off.

On April 29, police found what they initially believed was Van Newkirk's body, buried in a field. She had been bound in duct tape and wrapped in garbage bags. Bradley was arrested and charged with first degree murder for killing Van Newkirk. However, police soon discovered that the body was not Van Newkirk, but instead another woman, 33-year-old Elisha Tucker, who had been missing since August 2013. She had been bludgeoned to death. On December 5, 2016, Bradley was indicted for first degree murder for killing Tucker. Prosecutors announced they would seek a death sentence in that case.

Bradley was first tried for killing Van Newkirk. On June 29, 2017, he was convicted of second degree murder and sentenced to a minimum of 30 years and five months to a maximum of 37 years and six months in prison.

Prosecutors offered Bradley a life sentence if he gave the location of Van Newkirk's body, but he refused. On March 26, 2019, he was convicted of first degree murder for killing Tucker. However, Bradley was spared execution after the jury deadlocked 11–1 in favor a death sentence. He was instead sentenced to life in prison without parole.

Bradley is serving his sentence at Tabor City Correctional Institution.

== See also ==
- List of serial killers in the United States
- List of murder convictions without a body
