= Last call =

Overview of the term

In a bar, a last call (last orders) is an announcement made shortly before the bar closes for the night, informing patrons of their last chance to buy alcoholic beverages. There are various means to make the signal, like ringing a bell, flashing the lights, or announcing verbally.

Last call times are often legally mandated and vary widely globally as well as locally. Legislation's purposes include reducing late night noise in the neighborhood, traffic crashes, violence, and alcohol related health problems.

== Australia ==
In New South Wales, there is no specified closing time, but in residential areas, bars are often required to close at midnight. In non-residential areas, some bars are open 24 hours. A six-hour daily closure period applies to new licenses (and extended hours authorizations) granted from 30 October 2008, which is nominated depending on individual and community circumstances.

During a significant part of the early 20th century, bars in Australia and New Zealand were closed at 6 p.m. by law. The resulting rush to buy drinks after work was known as the six o'clock swill.

== Austria ==
Bar closing hours in Austria are regulated by the federated states. In most states bars must close at 4 a.m. although many places have special permits to close later. In the capital, Vienna, bars and clubs are allowed to stay open until 6 a.m. Alcohol is allowed to be served until the bar or club closes.

== Belgium ==
There is no legally mandated last call in Belgium; many bars will stay open all night.

== Brazil ==
There is no legally mandated last call in Brazil; many bars will stay open all night. Some cities have laws that require bars to close during the early morning hours.

== Canada ==
- British Columbia: Last call for serving alcohol is generally 2:00 a.m. provincially. Municipalities may change last call to as early as 12 a.m. or as late as 4 a.m. if they so choose. Downtown Vancouver's last call was moved to 4:00 a.m and outside Downtown to 3:00 am on weekends and 2:00 am on weeknights. On New Year's Eve last call is extended to 4 a.m. provincewide if food is available to patrons at the premises. Regulated liquor stores (both private and government-operated) can sell off-premises alcohol from 9:00 a.m. until 11:00 p.m., with government-operated liquor stores typically closing before 9 p.m.
- Alberta: Last call and sale of alcohol from a store or establishment is 2 a.m. province-wide. In an establishment, a customer may have no more than two drinks in possession after 1 a.m. or last call, whatever comes first. All liquor drinks are to be removed from patron areas by 3:00 a.m. at the latest.
- Manitoba: Last call and the sale of alcohol from a store or establishment is 2 a.m. province-wide. During special events, establishments are permitted to serve alcohol until 3 a.m.
- Ontario: Last call begins at 1:45 a.m. and fifteen minutes are allowed for ordering an alcoholic beverage. It is no longer legally permissible to serve alcohol past 2 a.m., although the province has the authority to grant waivers to allow closing at 4 a.m. during special events. On New Year's Eve, all licensed premises are allowed to serve until 3:00 a.m. In all cases, there is always an added 45 minute "consumption period" allowing patrons additional time to consume their purchases after alcohol sales have ended. Even though licensed establishments are never required to close their doors by a certain time, all alcohol must be removed by the end of the consumption period. Alcohol sales may occur only within regulated stores, which will always close between 9 p.m. and 11 p.m., depending on the location or the store (LCBO, Beer Store, Wine Stores or selected grocery stores). Licensed establishments can serve alcohol as early as 9:00 a.m.
- Quebec: Last call is 3 a.m. province wide for establishments serving alcohol (with some exceptions), while the sale of alcohol from a store is restricted after 11 p.m. Bars may allow customers to stay until 4 a.m. but may not serve alcohol past 3 a.m. Bars across the river from Ottawa (Hull area) close at 2 a.m. to match their Ontario counterparts.
- New Brunswick: Sales can start at 11:00 a.m. but must end at 2:00 a.m. the following day. A tolerance period of 30 minutes, beyond 2:00 a.m., is allowed to give patrons time to consume their beverage. At 2:30 a.m. the premises must be vacated.
- Newfoundland and Labrador: Last call is 2 a.m. on Monday, Tuesday and Wednesday and 3 a.m. the rest of the week. There is then a 30 minute "consumption period" before bars must close.
- Nova Scotia: Last call for most establishments is 2 a.m., Cabaret businesses are allowed to serve until 3:30 a.m.
- Saskatchewan: Last call is 2 a.m. On New Year's Eve, it is extended until 2:30 a.m. (on Jan. 1).
- Northwest Territories; Yukon: Last call is 2 a.m., extended to 3 a.m. on New Year's Eve.

== China ==
Many bars, KTVs and nightclubs have no specific last call and will continue to sell alcohol and stay open provided there are paying customers present. During times when national security is increased (i.e. the Olympics, the 60th Anniversary of the PRC), closing times may be in effect in some cities between 1 and 2 a.m. Alcohol is sold through retailers 24 hours a day.

== Croatia ==
Establishments that serve drinks may register as bars and may be open in inhabited areas only indoors and only between 9 p.m. and 6 a.m., but no such restrictions exist if bars are located outside inhabited areas. Various exceptions can be made for bars located in transit facilities, if approved by the local authorities, etc. The prescribed working hours for bars are a frequent point of contention between city authorities and local businessmen, particularly during the summer tourist season.

== Finland ==
Bars are allowed to serve drinks until 1:30 a.m., but a provincial government may at the proprietor's request, grant extensions up to 4 a.m. Extensions require the establishment to maintain a higher standard of amenities, service and entertainment by, for example, providing a coat check, entertainment programming such as a DJ or live music, and even general cleanliness and "look and feel" count. The laws were loosened beginning of 2018.

A last call is not announced per se, but as a custom, the lights are flashed a few times (or in case of a dimly lit establishment such as a nightclub, all lights are left on) to notify the customers that serving drinks is over. In Finnish lexicon "valomerkki" (lit. "Light signal") has become a common synonym for ending any activities for the night.

== Germany ==
Bar closing hours in Germany are regulated by the federated states or cities. Since the 2000s, many federated states and cities have none or relaxed regulations. In many states and cities bars are open as long as there are customers.

Open-air locations such as beer gardens often must close at 11 p.m. or 12 a.m. to reduce noise pollution. Exceptions may exist for weekends, Carnival and New Year's Eve. Not all cities strictly enforce the regulation.

== Greece ==
In Greece, all bars, cafeterias, clubs and the like will stay open as long as there are customers inside. Usually, cafeterias stay open until 11 p.m., bars until 2 a.m. and clubs until early in the morning, but there is no last call. In 1994, Stelios Papathemelis, the Minister for Public Order, passed a law mandating closing of all bars at 2 a.m. The law was widely unpopular, never materialized fully and was abolished a few years later.

== India ==
India closing time of bars vary in different states. In Delhi it is 1 am, Mumbai 1:30 am, Chennai, Hyderabad and Kolkata at midnight. In Chandigarh it is 1 a.m. weekdays and 2 a.m. weekends. In Bangalore it is 11:30 p.m. on weekdays and 1 am on Friday and Saturday nights.

== Ireland ==
Bar closing hours are governed by the Intoxicating Liquor Act 2000. Generally, bars must close at 23:30 Monday to Thursday, 00:30 on Friday and Saturday, and Sunday closing time is 23:00. There are special provisions for certain holidays and festivals. Bars may get an extended license until 02:30 any night.

On 25 October 2022, the Government announced a reform of licensing laws in the Sale of Alcohol Bill 2022. If passed, the law would permit bars to open until 00:30 every day. "Late bars" would continue to be permitted to open until 02:30, and nightclubs would be permitted to open until 06:00 (with the sale of alcohol ending at 05:00).

== Israel ==
In Israel, there are no specific closing times and the country has liberal alcohol laws. Bars and clubs in entertainment districts will serve alcohol practically 24 hours a day, while in residential districts local regulations apply; establishments that serve alcohol outside may often have to call their guests inside after midnight or even close completely.

In 2006, Knesset member Ruhama Avraham attempted to pass a bill in parliament that would forbid selling alcohol between 2 and 6 a.m. The bill faced severe resistance from bar and restaurant owners and finally was drawn back.

In Tel Aviv, bars are fined for remaining open past 1 a.m. Though few bars actually close at that time, they are forced to pay the "back-door" tax to the municipality, with no recourse to the national government. A number of bars are contemplated closing at the required time and during internationally promoted events such as Gay Pride Week in protest of the city's underhanded hypocrisy in promoting itself as "the city that never sleeps" but also fining the very establishments that make it such a hot tourist spot.

Alcohol is no longer sold around the clock in grocery stores, and no sales are allowed between 11 p.m. and 6 a.m.

== Italy ==
Italy does not have a legally mandated closing time. Alcohol may be served or sold anywhere 24 hours a day, 7 days a week. In Rome, an ordinance was passed in January 2009 to make 2 a.m. the last call in Campo de' Fiori and the neighbourhoods of Trastevere and Testaccio. The new last call time for these areas was initiated to curtail nighttime commotion in those popular parts of Rome.

== Japan ==
Japan does not have a legally mandated closing time. Alcohol may be served or sold anywhere 24 hours a day.

== New Zealand ==
Until December 18, 2013, bars could close at any time they wanted (often 7 am). Since December 18, 2013, all bars and nightclubs must close at 3 or 4 am. Special conditions apply on Holy/ Maundy Thursday, Holy Saturday (Easter Eve), the day before ANZAC day and Christmas Eve, when bars must close their doors by midnight. Private bars and working men's clubs may stay open beyond that curfew.

== Norway ==
Last call laws vary by municipality.

Municipality-specific laws

- Oslo Municipality: 3 a.m.
- Bergen: 2:30 a.m. (3 a.m. at places that plays live music)
- Trondheim: 2 a.m.
- Stavanger: 3 a.m., only for venues that are 21+
- Moss: 2:30 a.m.
- Fredrikstad: 1:30 a.m.
  - Bodø: 3 a.m.
- Harstad: 3 a.m.
- Hamar: 1:30 a.m.
- Kristiansand: 2 a.m.
- Molde: 2 a.m.
- Ålesund: 3 a.m.
- Drammen: 3 a.m.
- Tønsberg: 3 a.m.
- Tromsø: 3 a.m.
- Kirkenes: 2 a.m.
- Arendal: 2 a.m.
- Kongsberg: 2 a.m.
- Larvik: 2 a.m.
- Longyearbyen: 2 a.m.

Out of the 357 municipalities of Norway, almost 50% have established a closing time or "last call" at 2 a.m. Only 1 in 7 municipalities serves drinks until the maximum allowance at 3 a.m. That is a major decrease over the last few years because of the government's belief that reduced drinking hours equal less fighting, noise, disturbance, etc.

== Sweden ==
In Sweden, explicit last calls do not take place, as it would violate a political principle not to encourage people to drink more. The latest allowed closing time of bars and restaurant is decided by the municipality but regulated by national laws and rules. The standard latest time is 1 a.m. But in many cities a later time can be allowed on some conditions, like high security and staff educated in responsible serving of alcohol. In some of the largest cities, a closing time as late as 5 a.m. occurs. During the coronavirus pandemic 2020-2021 the alcohol law was used to limit the number of visitors to bars and restaurants (only for those serving alcohol) by setting the closing time to 8 p.m.

== Turkey ==
Turkey does not have a legally mandated closing time. In the new Turkish system, alcohol may no longer be sold in grocery stores past 11pm, but may still be sold in bars and clubs with no legally mandated last call.

== United Kingdom ==
Standard closing time was 11 pm, but increased flexibility was allowed in November 2005 under the Licensing Act 2003.

The average "Last Call" time is between 11 pm and 1 am in municipalities such as Birmingham and London. This information was taken from two hundred bars from 2014 to 2016. Bars and clubs may apply for individual licenses that allow them to close at any time between 11 pm and 3 am. Some establishments in large cities have 24-hour licenses.

== United States ==
In the U.S., the last call time varies mostly on state, county and/or municipality.

State-specific laws

- Alabama: 2 a.m. (Many bars and nightclubs in Birmingham have certain licensing to serve alcohol past 2 a.m., and instead determine last call when business diminishes. There is at least one nightclub in the city that serves alcohol 24/7 365 days a year. Mobile has many 24/7 bars, and the bars in its downtown entertainment district typically stay open until 7:00 am the next morning on Thursday, Friday, and Saturday nights.)
- Alaska: 5 a.m.; while most cities restrict this further, some do not (primarily smaller Matanuska-Susitna Valley towns), and some villages are dry.
- Arizona: 2 a.m.
- Arkansas: 2 a.m. A small number of licenses for nightclubs to sell until 5 a.m. exist, mostly in Little Rock and Fort Smith.
- California: 2 a.m.
- Colorado: 2 a.m.
- Connecticut: 2 a.m. Friday and Saturday nights. 1 a.m. Sunday through Thursday., 3 a.m. New Year's Eve (Day)
- Delaware: Last call is 12:45 a.m. Service must stop at 1 a.m. All drinks must be removed from tables by 2 a.m. Service resumes at 9 a.m.
- District of Columbia: 3 a.m. on Friday night, Saturday night, and the night before a federal or D.C. holiday; 4 a.m. on the night of New Year's Eve and the beginning of daylight saving time; 2 a.m. other nights.
- Florida: Last call set statewide to 2 a.m., some cities have passed exemptions to the law, notably Tampa, St. Petersburg, and Pinellas County (3 a.m.), Broward County (4 a.m.), Key West (4 a.m.), and Miami (24 hours in the Miami Entertainment District; 5 a.m. otherwise). Liquor store closing times vary by county.
- Georgia: Varies by county (most are set at 2 a.m., while others may have different times or no time at all). In Atlanta, most bars are allowed to close at 2:30 a.m., but Underground Atlanta can operate until 4 a.m.
- Hawaii: 4 a.m. Not all bars qualify for a 4 a.m. license; these must close at 2 a.m.
- Idaho: 2 a.m.
- Illinois: 1 a.m. through 3 a.m., varies by municipality. In Chicago, it is regular license bars 2 a.m., Sunday to Friday at 3 a.m. Saturday. Some bars have a late night license, allowing them to close two hours later so 4 a.m. Sunday through Friday at 5 a.m. Saturday.
- Indiana: 3 a.m. (was 12:30 on Sundays, not currently)
- Iowa: 2 a.m.
- Kansas: 2 a.m. (in the 17 counties allowing bars without limitation)
- Kentucky: 2 a.m. In Louisville, some bars may buy 4 a.m. licenses.
- Louisiana: There is no statewide closing time. Bars may remain open 24 hours a day, seven days a week. But Louisiana law provides:

The governing authority of any municipality within a parish with a population between fifty-three thousand and sixty thousand persons according to the most recent federal decennial census may enact ordinances to regulate the closing times of bars located within the municipality, subject to approval by a majority of the qualified electors of the municipality voting at an election held for the purpose.

- Maine: 1 a.m., 2 a.m. on New Year's Eve. In all instances, there is a 15-minute consumption period before the premises must be vacated.
- Maryland: 2 a.m.
- Massachusetts: 2 a.m., although cities and towns can (and frequently do) set last call earlier; Casinos can serve until 4 a.m., if purchaser is actively gaming. Alcohol sales stop 30 minutes prior to closing time.
- Michigan: 2 a.m., 4 a.m. New Year's Eve.
- Minnesota: 2 a.m. Many cities have a 1 a.m. restriction.
- Mississippi: 12:00 midnight or 1:00 a.m.; depending on city. Larger metro areas usually adhere to "After Midnight" policy. Most casinos do not have a last call.
- Missouri: 1:30 a.m. in most of the state; 3 a.m. in specially licensed establishments in the two largest metropolises of St. Louis and Kansas City, and their surrounding areas.
- Montana: Last call for bars and taverns is around 1:30 a.m. One can purchase beer from many local gas stations and grocery stores until 2 a.m. State law reads, "Agency liquor stores may remain open during the period between 8 a.m. and 2 a.m." In spite of this, most liquor stores close on or before 10 p.m. with the exception of casino/liquor stores.
- Nebraska: 1 a.m.; except for municipalities (Omaha & Lincoln) are allowed to stay open until 2 am.
- Nevada: There is no set statewide closing time. Bars may remain open 24 hours a day, 7 days a week.
- New Hampshire: Statewide is 1:00 a.m., bars must close at 1:30 a.m. Must call last call at 12:45 a.m. On-premises licensees may sell from 6:00 a.m. to 1:00 a.m., 7 days a week. The licensee may sell until 2:00 a.m. under conditions authorized by the city or town in which the premises (bar or club) are located if the city or town's legislative body adopts an ordinance authorizing such sale
- New Jersey: No statewide closing time. Most municipalities set their last call at 2 a.m. Atlantic City serves 24 hours. Ocean City is a dry town.
- New Mexico: 2 a.m. Monday thru Saturday. 12 a.m. on Sundays.
- New York: Under state law, establishments must stop serving alcohol by 4 a.m. The actual closing time is left up to each of New York's 62 counties. The 4 a.m. time applies in New York City; clubs and bars may remain open after 4 a.m. without serving alcohol; they may start serving at 8 a.m. except on Sunday when sales begin at 10 a.m.. Last call is also 4 a.m. in Albany, Buffalo, and Saratoga Springs. Binghamton has a last call of 3 a.m., Syracuse and Rochester have a time of 2 a.m., and Elmira, Geneva, and Ithaca have a time of 1 a.m. Rural counties may be even earlier.
- North Carolina: Last call is 2 a.m. statewide. On weekdays and Saturdays, alcohol can be sold beginning at 7 a.m., on Sunday alcohol sales begin at 10 a.m. in most counties. Liquor stores (ABC) closed on Sundays.
- North Dakota: 1 a.m.. Recent legislation allows each county and city by local option to set a 2 a.m. closing time. North Dakota's closing time is strict. All drinks must be off the tables and the bar closed by the mandatory closing time.
- Ohio: Last call is 2 a.m. statewide, but establishments may acquire licenses that allow them to serve until 2:30 a.m. Store-bought beer and wine sales stop at 1 a.m. Liquor over 42 proof must be purchased in state-approved stores, whose sales stop at 10 p.m.
- Oklahoma: 2 a.m.
- Oregon: 2:30 a.m.
- Pennsylvania: 2 a.m. in taverns, 3 a.m. in membership-only clubs statewide. Sales may begin as early as 7 a.m. Pennsylvania Liquor Control Board–operated liquor stores (known as "Wine & Spirits Shoppes", or commonly called "state stores") operate various hours, but never open before 9 a.m. and never close later than 10 p.m. About ten percent of state stores, most of which near the borders of the Commonwealth, are open from noon to 5 p.m. on Sundays.
- Rhode Island: 1 a.m. seven days a week. 2 a.m. in Providence only on Friday and Saturday nights and nights before a state-recognized holiday.
- South Carolina: Set by county or municipality. No alcohol sales (on or off premises) is permitted on Sundays, except in Aiken City, Columbia, Charleston, Greenville / North Augusta, South Carolina, Spartanburg, and the Myrtle Beach area.
- South Dakota: 2 a.m.
- Tennessee: 3 a.m.
- Texas: Serving stops at midnight or 2 a.m. (depending on city and county population) on Monday through Saturday; beverages may be sold until 1 or 2 a.m. Sunday (depending on population), and then again at 10 a.m. (if food is served with the liquor) or 12 noon (regardless of food). All drinks must be up fifteen minutes after serving stops. Starting September 1, 2021, hotel bars will be able to serve alcohol to registered guests 24/7
- Utah: Last call is 1 a.m., and establishments must be closed by 2 a.m.
- Vermont: 2 a.m., 3 a.m. on New Year's Eve
- Virginia: All on-premises drinks must be up by 2 a.m. If Daylight Saving Time is ending, the first instance of 2 a.m. counts. Some bars possess grandfathered licenses obtained before the current last call was instituted, allowing them to sell at any time. Off-premises premises must stop by midnight. Liquors may be acquired for off-premises consumption only at state-run liquor stores, which have fewer hours.
- Washington: 2 a.m.
- West Virginia: 3 a.m.
- Wisconsin: 2 a.m. Sunday through Thursday, 2:30 a.m. Friday and Saturday. No closing time on New Year's Eve.
- Wyoming: 2 a.m.

City-specific laws

- Albany, New York: 4 a.m.
- Atlanta: 2:30 a.m.; 4 a.m. in Underground Atlanta. Midnight on Sunday night/Monday morning.
- Atlantic City: Bars may stay open 24 hours a day, 7 days a week.
- Austin: 2 a.m.
- Baltimore: 2 a.m.
- Bloomington and Normal, Illinois: 1 a.m. on weeknights, 2 a.m. on weekends.
- Bloomington, Indiana: 3 a.m.
- Boston: 2 a.m.
- Buffalo: 4 a.m., 24 hours on specific holidays.
- Champaign, Illinois: 2 a.m.
- Charlotte: 2 a.m.
- Chicago: Some bars may choose to close at 2 a.m. or earlier. They may alternately get an extension to allow them to close at 4 a.m. or earlier. On Saturdays, closing times are shifted an hour back to 3 and 5 a.m.
- Cincinnati: 2:15 a.m. for last call; 2:30 a.m. for closing time.
- Cleveland: 2:30 a.m.
- Columbus: 2:30 a.m.
- Denver: 2 a.m.
- Florence, South Carolina: 2 a.m. for hard liquor, 3 a.m. for beer. This includes Sundays where any bar that is defined as a private club may operate 7 days a week, otherwise last call is midnight Saturday night, until the establishment reopens for business on Monday.
- Fort Wayne, Indiana: 3 a.m.
- Houston: alcohol service stops at 2 a.m.
- Indianapolis: 3 a.m.
- Kansas City, Missouri: 1:30 a.m. for most bars, 3 a.m. for specially licensed bars in certain geographic areas, 6:00 a.m. for one bar only, the Mutual Musicians Foundation.
- Key West, Florida: 4 a.m.
- Lake Charles, Louisiana: 24 hours a day except Sundays. Bars must be closed between 2:30 a.m. on Sunday and 12:01 a.m. on Monday.
- Las Vegas: Bars may stay open 24 hours a day, 7 days a week.
- Los Angeles: 2 a.m.
- Lexington, Kentucky: 2:30 a.m.
- Louisville, Kentucky: 2 a.m. or 4 a.m., depending on license.
- Miami: 5 a.m.; Bars may stay open 24 hours, 7 days a week in the Downtown Entertainment District.
- Minneapolis–Saint Paul: 2 a.m.
- Mobile: No last call for bars operating under a private club license
- New Orleans: Bars may stay open 24 hours, 7 days a week.
- New York City: 4 a.m.; nightclubs and bars are permitted to stay open after 4 a.m. but cannot serve alcohol.
- Pensacola, Florida: 3 a.m. (within city limits, 2 a.m. for county)
- Peoria, Illinois: Bars in the downtown district may stay open until 4 a.m. Bars in other areas may stay open until 1 a.m. Sunday through Wednesday and 2 a.m. Thursday through Saturday. Bars may stay open 2 hours later than normal closing hours on New Year's Eve, but additional patrons are not allowed after normal closing hours.
- Phoenix / Scottsdale: 2 a.m.
- Philadelphia: 2 a.m.
- Pittsburgh: 2 a.m.
- Providence: 2 a.m. on weekends, and nights before a state-recognized holiday. 1 a.m. on weeknights.
- Rochester, New York: 2 a.m. On New Year's Eve establishments can apply for a one night license to stay open until 4 a.m.
- Salt Lake City: 1 a.m.
- San Antonio: 2 a.m.
- San Diego: 2 a.m.
- San Francisco: 2 a.m.
- Saratoga Springs, New York: 4 a.m.
- Savannah, Georgia: 3 a.m.
- Seattle: 2 a.m.
- Shreveport, Louisiana: 6 a.m. for Downtown, 4 a.m. everywhere else.
- St. Louis: 1:30 a.m. for most bars, with some 3 a.m. bars
- St. Petersburg, Florida: 3 a.m.
- Tampa: 3 a.m.
- Washington, D.C.: 3 a.m. on Friday night, Saturday night, and the night before a federal or DC holiday; 4 a.m. on the night of New Year's Eve; 2 a.m. other nights.

== See also ==
- Alcohol laws of the United States by state
- List of public house topics
