= North Carolina State Defense Militia =

- Active: 1941–1947; 1988–1996
- Country: United States
- Allegiance: North Carolina
- Type: State defense force
- Role: Military reserve force

Commanders
- Civilian leadership: Governor of North Carolina

The North Carolina State Defense Militia is the currently inactive State defense force of North Carolina.

== World War II ==
The North Carolina State Guard was officially established as a state defense force on 27 February 1941 when the North Carolina National Guard was mobilized into federal service during World War II. The State Guard actually began organizing in early February with the appointment of officers, and the mustered strength reached a high of 2,128 by 1944. With the return of the National Guard, units began being inactivated in 1946, and the State Guard was completely disbanded by July 1947.

== Reactivation ==
The North Carolina State Defense Militia (NCSDM) was reactivated by North Carolina Governor James G. Martin in February 1988.

The NC State Defense Militia operated under Chapter 127A of the North Carolina General Statutes, and as such, is a distinct unit from the NC National Guard.

The NCSDF participated in operations for Hurricane Hugo in 1989 and members filled in for National Guard troops while they were deployed for the Persian Gulf War in 1990–91. Other actions were during coastal storms and an outbreak of tornadoes in King, North Carolina.

Due to the temporary suspension in 1996, the NCSDM was never officially re-activated by the North Carolina governors elected since April 1996.

== Authority ==
Joint Resolution 987 of the North Carolina General Assembly ratified 27 June 1995 honored the efforts and assistance of the members of the NCSDF and expressed appreciation for the service that the members rendered to their respective communities, counties, and to the State of North Carolina.

== Temporary Suspension ==
Activities of the NCSDM were temporarily suspended in April 1996 by the North Carolina Adjutant General. This suspension was due to a workers' compensation claim, and a review of the workers' compensation laws regarding the North Carolina State Defense Militia. This temporary suspension at the state governor's level is still in effect.

== Historical North Carolina militias ==
The North Carolina Provincial Congress authorized a militia in 1775 for the American Revolution. The militia continued after the war. In 1836, the North Carolina General Assembly of 1836–1837 passed a law establishing a permanent militia. The law enrolled all free white males between the ages of 18 and 45 in the State Militia. Exceptions were given for certain public officials and other occupations. Free black males could only be enrolled as musicians in the militia. The division, brigade, and regiment structure of the militia was prescribed and included each county.

== See also ==
- North Carolina National Guard
- North Carolina Naval Militia
- North Carolina Wing Civil Air Patrol
