= Carthage nursing home shooting =

2009 mass shooting in North Carolina, U.S.

- Carthage (North Carolina)
- Location: 35.3332°N 79.4147°W; Carthage, North Carolina, U.S.
- Date: March 29, 2009; 17 years ago c. 10:00 – c. 10:05 a.m. (EDT; UTC−04:00)
- Target: Wanda Neal (perpetrator's wife)
- Attack type: Mass shooting; mass murder; attempted uxoricide; senicide; shootout
- Weapons: 12-gauge Winchester 1300 shotgun; .357 Magnum revolver; .22 Magnum semi-automatic pistol; .22 Magnum Remington Model 597 (unused)
- Deaths: 8
- Injuries: 3 (including the perpetrator)
- Perpetrator: Robert Kenneth Stewart
- Defender: Jerry Avant
- Charges: First degree murder (8 counts)
- Convictions: Second degree murder (8 counts)
- Convicted: Robert Kenneth Stewart

The Carthage nursing home shooting was a mass shooting that occurred on March 29, 2009, when a gunman opened fire at Pinelake Health and Rehabilitation, a 120-bed nursing home in Carthage, North Carolina, United States. The shooter, 45-year-old Robert Kenneth Stewart, killed eight people, including a nurse at the home, and wounded a ninth. He was shot and apprehended by a responding police officer, who was wounded by gunfire.

Stewart was said to have intended to kill his estranged wife, a nurse at the nursing home, who had hidden and survived the shooting unharmed. Initially charged with first degree murder, Stewart was tried in 2011 and convicted of eight counts of second degree murder. He was sentenced to 179 years, 4 months, and 20 days. It is the deadliest mass shooting in the State of North Carolina.

== Shooting ==
Robert Stewart, 45, dressed in a bib overall, arrived at the parking lot of the nursing home just before 10:00 a.m., where he fired several shots at the empty car of his estranged wife, shattering its windows. Stewart then fired at the car of visitor Michael Lee Cotten as he was driving into the parking lot, hitting him in the left shoulder. Cotten, who later stated that Stewart was "very calm...very deliberate" during the shooting, managed to run into the building and warn the people inside of the gunman. Police received the first emergency calls at approximately 10:00 a.m. and the only police officer on duty in Carthage, 25-year-old Cpl. Justin Garner, was dispatched to the scene.

Leaving a camouflaged Remington 597 .22 Magnum rifle atop a Jeep Cherokee, Stewart entered the nursing home armed with a .357 Magnum handgun, a .22 Magnum semi-automatic pistol, and a 12-gauge Winchester 1300 shotgun and went down the hall, apparently searching for his estranged wife, Wanda Neal. She had left him three weeks earlier because of his abusive behavior, drinking, violent temper, and possessiveness. She had been reassigned to the Alzheimer's unit that morning. When she heard the shooting, she hid in a locked and passcode-protected bathroom.

Upon realizing that his wife wasn't where she usually worked, Stewart headed to the area for Alzheimer's patients, which was secured by passcode-protected doors. As he walked through the hallways of the nursing home, Stewart killed seven residents—two of them in their wheelchairs—while the staff tried to move other patients to safety. He shot and killed nurse Jerry Avant, who tried to stop the gunman. Avant was the only employee killed.

Police Cpl. Garner confronted Stewart in the hallway at about 10:05 a.m. After refusing several orders to drop his weapon, Stewart lowered his shotgun and fired a shot at Garner, hitting him with three scattergun pellets in the left leg. Garner returned fire and hit Stewart in the chest, incapacitating him. Years later, Garner recalled that the wounded Stewart had said only: "Kill me, kill me."

At the end of the shooting, six people were dead at the scene; five others, including Stewart, were taken to a nearby hospital, where two of the wounded died the same day.

=== Victims ===
- Jerry Avant Jr., 39, nurse
- Louise DeKler, 98
- Lillian Dunn, 89
- Tessie Garner, 75
- John Walter Goldston, 78
- Bessie Hedrick, 78
- Margaret Johnson, 89
- Jesse Vernon Musser, 88

Louise DeKler, being 98-years-old, is the oldest known mass shooting victim in American history.

== Aftermath ==
Stewart was charged with eight counts of first degree murder. On September 3, 2011, a jury convicted Stewart of eight counts of second-degree murder (and several other lesser charges). "The judge imposed the maximum sentence – 15 years, nine months to 19 years, eight months – for each count of murder, with the terms to run consecutively." He was sentenced to a total incarceration term of 179 years, four months, and 20 days. The prosecution had planned to seek a death sentence for Stewart had he been found guilty of first degree murder.

Stewart's defense attorneys, Jonathan Megerian and Franklin Wells of Asheboro, North Carolina, had argued that Stewart was under the influence of Ambien during the shooting, and therefore not capable of premeditation and deliberation, two elements of first degree murder under North Carolina law. He had been taking it for two years prior to the shooting, and defense experts said he was unable to control his actions. The prosecution made the case that he had carried out elaborate planning prior to the attack and on that morning, so he was in control of his actions.

== Perpetrator ==
Robert Kenneth Stewart
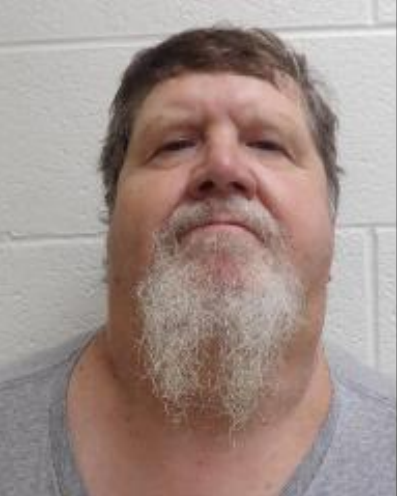
- Undated mugshot
- Born: Robert Kenneth Wayne Stewart; September 12, 1963 (age 63); Robeson County, North Carolina, U.S.
- Status: Incarcerated
- Conviction: Second degree murder (x8)
- Penalty: Life imprisonment without parole

Details
- Imprisoned at: Neuse Correctional Institution

Robert Kenneth Wayne Stewart (born September 12, 1963) was born in Robeson County. When he was a young boy, his family moved to Eastwood in Moore County. His father was a house painter, and his mother worked at an office of a paving company in Pinebluff. After finishing middle school in Aberdeen, Stewart attended Pinecrest High School, but dropped out before graduating. Among his peers Stewart was known as a quiet loner, who showed a volatile bad temper at times.

At the age of 18, Stewart married for the first time in 1981; his marriage lasted only for a few months. In 1983 he married then 17-year-old Wanda Gay Neal, but this marriage failed within three years, reportedly due to Stewart's extreme possessiveness, his excess drinking, and his violent temper. Wanda Neal's mother Margaret Neal later stated: "He had a rage, it would just explode over everything. He would be good and then something would just set him off." Both Margaret Neal and Wanda Neal's 14-year-old daughter Jamie said that, as far as they knew, Stewart had never hit his wife.

In 1986 Stewart married again, though he still harbored feelings for his former wife. According to his third wife, Sue Griffin, Stewart would often compare her to Wanda Neal and complain that "Wanda doesn't do it like that."

Stewart worked as a house painter and had his own painting business, but had filed twice for bankruptcy. He had been out of work for over a year before the shooting, after injuring his back and leg. He served six years in the National Guard and never rose above the rank of private before receiving an honorable discharge. In 1995 he joined the Clay Road Farm Hunt Club in Moore County, where he soon alienated the other members because of his drinking problem and his temper. He was eventually thrown out of the hunting club, after threatening Larry Allred, one of its founders.

In 2001, after 15 years of marriage to Sue Griffin, Stewart divorced again and returned to Wanda Neal. After he promised her he would change, stop drinking, and treat her well, they married a second time in June 2002. But as time passed, Stewart again showed extreme possessiveness and would not let his wife go anywhere alone. After he put a gun to her head and threatened to kill her, Wanda Neal left her husband and returned to her parents' home, three weeks prior to the shooting. After his wife had left him, Stewart began calling her family, sometimes at 2:00 or 3:00 a.m., claiming there was an emergency and he needed to see Wanda and her parents. He also tried to contact his former wife, Sue Griffin, through her family, telling them that he was suffering from prostate cancer, that he was preparing to "go away", and that he "was planning on leaving town to visit places he hadn’t seen." According to Mack Hancock, who had seen him in the last week before the shooting, Stewart seemed very depressed, saying that "everything had gone to hell."

As of November 2024, Stewart is housed at the Neuse Correctional Institution in Goldsboro, North Carolina.

== See also ==
- List of rampage killers in the United States
- Campus Walk Apartment fire - another act of mass murder targeting in ex in North Carolina.
- 2011 Grand Rapids shootings
- 2011 Seal Beach shooting
- Azana Spa shooting
- 2014 Harris County shooting
- Covina massacre
