= Blanche Taylor Moore =

American murderer on death row

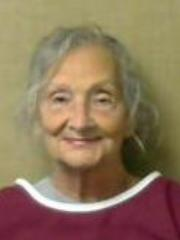
- Born: Blanche Kiser; February 17, 1933 (age 93); Concord, North Carolina, U.S.
- Status: Incarcerated
- Children: 2
- Conviction: First degree murder
- Penalty: Death

Details
- Victims: 1–4
- Span of crimes: 1968–1989
- Country: United States
- State: North Carolina
- Date apprehended: July 18, 1989
- Imprisoned at: North Carolina Correctional Institution for Women

Blanche Taylor Moore (née Kiser; born February 17, 1933) is an American convicted murderer and a possible serial killer from Alamance County, North Carolina. She is awaiting execution in North Carolina for the fatal poisoning of her boyfriend in 1986. She is also suspected of the deaths of her father, mother-in-law, first husband and several others, as well as the attempted murder of her second husband in 1989.

== Early life ==
Blanche Taylor Moore was born Blanche Kiser in Concord, North Carolina on February 17, 1933. Her parents were Parker Davis Kiser, a millworker and ordained Baptist minister, and Flonnie Blanche Kiser (née Honeycutt). Moore's father was a womanizer and alcoholic who, she later claimed, forced her into prostitution to pay his gambling debts. He died, reportedly of a heart attack, in 1966. As a youth, Moore was known to switch from quoting scripture to sexually explicit topics in the same breath.

== Murders and attempted murder ==
On May 29, 1952, Moore married James Napoleon Taylor, a Korean War veteran and furniture restorer; they had two children, one in 1953 and another in 1959. In 1954, she began working as a cashier at Kroger. By 1959, she had been promoted to head cashier, the highest position available to a female employee at the time. In 1962, Moore began an affair with Raymond Reid, the store manager. Taylor died on October 2, 1973; and, as with her father seven years earlier (1966), the cause of death was reported as a heart attack.

After her husband's death, Moore and Reid began dating publicly. By 1985, however, the relationship had soured. There are indications that she began to date Robert J. Hutton, the store's regional manager for the Piedmont Triad area; however, that relationship ended, and she filed a sexual harassment lawsuit against Hutton and the store in October 1985. Hutton was forced to resign, and the store settled the case out of court two years later for $275,000. In 1985, Moore also accused an unknown "pervert" of starting two fires that damaged her mobile home.

On Easter Sunday, Moore met Dwight Moore, the divorced pastor of the Carolina United Church of Christ in rural Alamance County. The two began meeting for meals. Moore had to conceal this relationship because her lawsuit against Kroger maintained that she was "completely alienated and antagonistic towards men and has not been able to maintain any meaningful social contacts with the opposite sex." While she was dating Dwight, she asked him to procure some arsenic-based ant killer.

In 1986, Reid developed what initially was diagnosed as a case of shingles. He was hospitalized in April and died on October 7, and Moore and Dwight began seeing each other publicly. Doctors indicated the cause of death was Guillain–Barré syndrome. The lawsuit with her previous employer was settled one year later. Moore and Dwight planned to marry, but she was diagnosed with breast cancer in 1987. The wedding date was pushed to November 1988, but Dwight developed a mysterious intestinal ailment that required two surgeries to correct. On April 19, 1989, the couple were married and had a honeymoon in New Jersey. Within days of their return, Dwight became severely ill and collapsed after eating a fast-food chicken sandwich that Moore had given him.

After several days of extreme nausea and vomiting, Dwight was admitted to Alamance County Hospital on April 28, 1989. For the next two days, he was transferred between Alamance County and North Carolina Baptist Hospital in Winston-Salem. He was then admitted to North Carolina Memorial Hospital in Chapel Hill, where his condition deteriorated to the point of near-death. Dwight had told doctors he had been working with herbicide soon after the honeymoon. Doctors Lucas Wong, Jonathan Serody, Mark Murphy and George Sanders, after discussions with the hospital toxicologist, ordered a toxicology screen to check for herbicide poisoning. The results came back on March 13, showing Dwight had 20 times the lethal dose of arsenic in his system–the most arsenic found in a living patient in the hospital's history. Dwight had a particularly robust constitution and survived, but lost the full use of his hands and feet. He was still suffering from complications as recently as 2010.

The hospital and the North Carolina State Bureau of Investigation (SBI) notified the police of Dwight's toxicology results. When interviewed by police from his hospital bed, he mentioned that a former boyfriend of Moore's died from Guillain–Barré syndrome, which presents similar symptoms to arsenic poisoning. Investigators also discovered Moore had attempted to change Dwight's pension to make herself the principal beneficiary. In light of these revelations, exhumations of Taylor, Reid and her father were ordered by investigators. Autopsies showed elevated levels of arsenic in all three bodies. The levels found in Reid and Taylor were determined to be fatal, therefore reclassifying their deaths as the result of arsenic poisoning. It also emerged that doctors at Baptist Hospital, where Reid was admitted in 1986, had ordered a toxicology screen for him. However, on the day the test came back, the resident responsible for Reid's care rotated to another hospital, and the new resident never passed the results to the chain of command. These results had shown an extremely high level of arsenic in his system.

During interviews, Moore stated that both Taylor and Reid felt depressed and suggested they had probably been taking arsenic themselves—something investigators found highly improbable. Additionally, it emerged she had been sleeping with Reid around the same time she began dating Dwight, raising questions about her possible involvement with Reid's death. She also had Dwight's hair cut to prevent hair samples from being obtained by the SBI; samples of pubic hair were used instead. On July 18, 1989, Moore was arrested and charged with first-degree murder in the deaths of Taylor and Reid. She also was charged with assault with a deadly weapon for the poisoning of Dwight. Prosecutors later dropped the charges in the cases of Taylor and Dwight after she was sentenced to death for Reid's murder.

== Trial, conviction and sentence ==
Moore's trial opened in Winston-Salem on October 21, 1990. She adamantly denied giving Reid any food while he was hospitalized, but the state introduced 53 witnesses who testified the opposite. The state had an easier time making such a complex case because Reid's ex-wife and sons sued Baptist Hospital for malpractice; they were able to get the normal statute of limitations for wrongful death thrown out because they were able to prove that Moore, as executor of Reid's estate, should have been the person to find out about the toxicology screen. The Reid family argued that Moore fraudulently prevented them from finding out about the test; longstanding precedent in U.S. courts holds that statute of limitations do not apply when the defendant engages in fraudulent concealment.

Under the terms of a deal between the Forsyth County district attorney's office and lawyers for the Reid family, most of the evidence against Moore was gathered by the latter party. Longstanding precedent holds that the Fifth Amendment gives defendants broad protection against self-incrimination in criminal cases. With few exceptions, these protections don't apply for civil cases. Civil law also allows much more latitude for searches and subpoenas.

Moore was convicted on November 14, 1990. On November 17, the jury recommended the death penalty. On January 18, 1991, the presiding judge concurred with the jury and sentenced Moore to die by lethal injection. She currently resides at the North Carolina Correctional Institution for Women as prisoner #0288088.

In prison, Moore has written music and spends her time writing poetry. Health issues have required her to undergo both chemotherapy and radiation therapy. Because of the automatic appeals in progress, she has avoided execution for over 33 years. She maintains her innocence.

One of Moore's attorneys, David Tamer, misappropriated client funds, including hers, and was convicted of embezzlement. He also had a history of psychological problems. In 2010, Moore and the 11 other death row inmates from Forsyth County filed a motion to convert their sentences to life imprisonment based on the state's Racial Justice Act. Essentially, the issue was the racial composition of the juries. Dwight told Winston-Salem station WXII-TV that he has no objections to his ex-wife seeking to have her death sentence overturned.

== Book and film ==
In 1993, author Jim Schutze wrote a book about the murders, titled Preacher's Girl. The author found evidence that seemed to indicate that Moore set up Hutton in the sexual harassment suit and may have intentionally set the two fires. Later that year, Elizabeth Montgomery played Moore in the television film based on the book titled Black Widow Murders: The Blanche Taylor Moore Story.

Episode 66 (Case 66: The Black Widow) of the Casefile True Crime podcast covers the case of Blanche Taylor Moore, including her crimes, the investigation of them, and her trial.

In 1999, the Discovery Channel's The New Detectives series, season 4, episode 6, "Women Who Kill", featured Blanche Taylor Moore's crimes. Her crimes were portrayed in the Evil Lives Here episode "The Black Widow", and the Snapped episode "Blanche Taylor Moore".

In the reenactment segment of the last episode of Season 1 of Deadly Women, Blanche Taylor Moore was portrayed by Maja Meschitschek.

Blanche Taylor Moore's crimes were also portrayed in Netflix's 2019 series Poisonous Liaisons in the first half of episode 2.

== See also ==
- Velma Barfield – a similar killer who was also from North Carolina
- Stacey Castor
- Judy Buenoano
- Audrey Marie Hilley
- List of death row inmates in the United States
- List of women on death row in the United States

== External links and references ==
- NC Dept. of Corrections records, showing current status of Blanche Taylor Moore
