= Alexander Correctional Institution =

State prison in North Carolina

Coordinates: 35°53′07″N 81°10′38″W

- Interactive map of Alexander Correctional Institution
- Location: 633 Old Landfill Road, Taylorsville, North Carolina
- Status: open
- Security class: close security
- Capacity: 1180
- Opened: April 2004
- Managed by: North Carolina Department of Public Safety

Alexander Correctional Institution (AXCI) is a North Carolina Department of Public Safety state prison for men, located in Taylorsville, North Carolina. The facility opened in 2004 as one of three 1000-bed Close Custody prisons built in the state.

The institution is a Close Custody prison, used mainly for housing felons. Inmates are assigned to one of four internal units: the Blue Unit for transferring prisoners and those with chronic health issues, Red Unit for security risk group and Mental Health prisoners, Green Unit for inmates on internal work assignments, and a Restrictive Housing Unit for disciplinary purposes.

== Treatment of prisoners ==
In August 2008, a prisoner named Timothy Helms claimed that, while in solitary confinement, a beating by corrections officers had left him a brain-damaged quadriplegic. An internal investigation showed various violations of the prison's own standards (Helms had been in restrictive housing for 571 consecutive days, officers had tethered him with a nylon strap similar to a leash, medical attention was delayed until the next day, etc.). No charges were ever filed, although one prison guard resigned after the investigation. Helms died in an extended-care facility in September 2010.

In 2014, two Alexander inmates died within four months. One of these was on March 12, when prisoner Michael Kerr died of dehydration while being transported for medical attention. Seven officers were fired after the event and another two resigned. Kerr's death prompted a federal criminal investigation and the state prison system settling a lawsuit with Kerr's heirs for $2.5 million.

On June 25, 2016, officers found inmate Justin Cauble unresponsive in his cell, dead of an apparent drug overdose.

== See also ==
- List of North Carolina state prisons
