= Roanoke River Correctional Institution =

Prison in North Carolina, United States

Coordinates: 36.301361°N 77.455462°W

- Interactive map of Roanoke River Correctional Institution
- Location: 2787 Caledonia Drive Halifax, North Carolina
- Status: open
- Security class: medium/minimum
- Capacity: 1038
- Opened: 1892
- Managed by: North Carolina Department of Correction

The Roanoke River Correctional Institution is a medium security prison in North Carolina, United States. The second oldest state prison in North Carolina, it has operated from 1892 to the present. It is located in Halifax County, on approximately 7,500 acres that was purchased by the state in 1899. It was previously named the Caledonia State Prison Farm and the Caledonia Correctional Institution.

The prison is mostly for men serving a life sentence. Halifax Community College works with the prison to provide vocational classes, adult basic education and preparation for the GED tests.

About 5,500 acres of farmland are under cultivation at Roanoke River. Correction Enterprises manages the farm which row crops such as corn, wheat, cotton and soybeans. In addition, the inmates from Tillary correctional just down the road farm 300 acres of vegetables like tomatoes, sweet corn, collard greens, sweet potatoes, squash, cucumbers and melons for the inmates at Roanoke River Correctional Institution to clean and can in order to supply the rest of the prison system in NC.

The cannery processes and cans crops grown on the farm for distribution to prison kitchens across the state. It is 12,770 square feet and has the capability of canning about 500,000 gallons of commodities per year. Inmates may also work as janitors or kitchen help.

== History ==
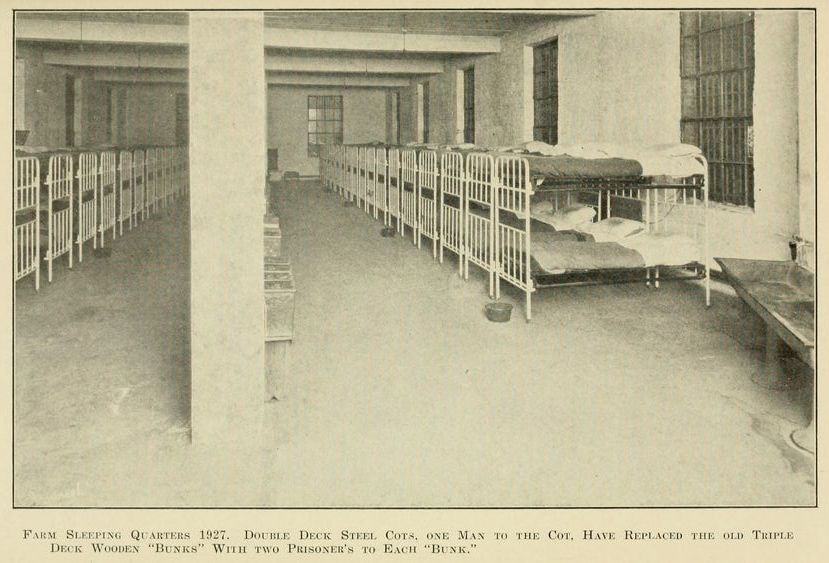
Sleeping quarters, 1927

Historically, prisoners worked either in a workshop or on a chain gang. The prison was made up of a prison building and some camps outside. Inmates would travel through Sampson County to railroad tracks to work long hours.

With the intent of putting inmates to work, the General Assembly leased the Caledonia farm in 1890. Nine years later, the property was purchased for $61,000. Roanoke River flooding damaged the farm in 1901 and 1902. In 1919, the prison farm was auctioned in parcels for a total of $497,000. The auction raised little cash since most of the land was purchased on credit.

Flooding problems continued to plague the area and practically the entire farm was repossessed by the state within five years of the auction. About 600 inmates were returned to the prison and housed in temporary wooden shacks. They worked to ditch and clear the land for farming. In 1925 construction began on a brick dormitory. Inmates moved into the building in 1927. Heat and hot water were provided the inmates in 1929.

Caledonia's main building originally housed men and women. Eight dormitories downstairs housed men and two dormitories upstairs housed women. Today the dorms house medium custody adult male inmates.

In 1976, 144 additional cells were built. These cells currently house medium custody adult male inmates. Another 142 cells built in 1980 are used today to house medium custody inmates. The prison also has buildings for vocational classes and recreation.

== See also ==
- List of North Carolina state prisons
