= North Carolina Correctional Institution for Women =

Women's prison in North Carolina, US

Coordinates: 35°45′53″N 78°37′16″W

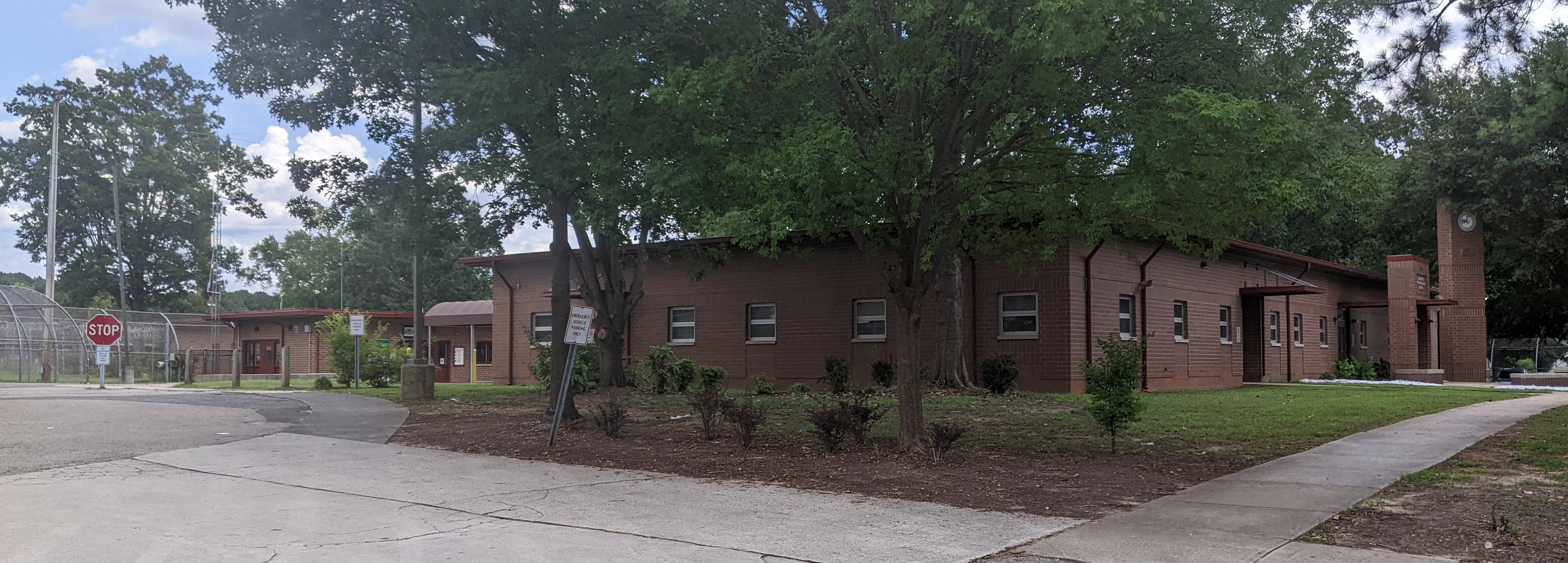
- Interactive map of North Carolina Correctional Institution for Women
- Location: 1034 Bragg Street Raleigh, North Carolina
- Status: Operational
- Security class: Minimum, Medium, Close
- Capacity: 1288
- Opened: 1938
- Managed by: North Carolina Department of Public Safety
- Warden: Anthony Perry

North Carolina Correctional Institution for Women (NCCIW) is the primary North Carolina Department of Public Safety prison facility housing female inmates on a 30-acre (12 ha) campus in Raleigh, North Carolina, and serves as a support facility for the six other women's prisons throughout the state. The facility's inmate population, which is the largest in the state, consists of inmates from all custody levels and control statuses including death row, maximum security, close custody, medium security, minimum security, and safekeepers.

== History ==
The facility which eventually became the North Carolina Correctional Institution for Women was originally established as a road camp for male inmates who were assigned to work on highway projects. The North Carolina Department of Public Safety states that women inmates were transferred to the facility’s current site in 1933, during the renovation of women's living quarters at Central Prison.

While some women were housed at Central Prison, mainly minority and immigrant women, and women who had committed violent crimes, many women guilty of minor crimes like theft, prostitution, drunkenness, and adultery were sent to the North Carolina Industrial Farm Colony for Women at Kinston, a reformatory institution that opened in 1929. Little information exists on the Farm Colony, but there are biennial reports from the institution dating up to the year 1946. Some sources associate the institution with the forced sterilization of inmates during the eugenics movement in the United States.

As an alternative to returning women inmates to Central Prison, the State Highway and Public Works Commission originally proposed the construction of a women's prison on the cottage plan, but the project never got beyond the planning stage.

The women’s prison was operated as a satellite camp of Central Prison until 1938 when the North Carolina Correctional Institution for Women was established as an independent facility. Four years later, Mrs. Edna B. Strickland was appointed as Superintendent of the North Carolina Correctional Institution for Women, becoming the first female prison superintendent in North Carolina history in 1942.

The first improvement to the prison infrastructure was a $1 million construction project which expanded NCCIW facilities to include four cottage style dormitories, an auditorium, a segregation unit, a sewing plant, a cannery, laundry, kitchen a dining hall, and an administration building in the late 1940s and early 1950s.

In June 1975, an inmate riot at the prison began as a work stoppage in the prison laundry and ended with a confrontation between correctional officers and inmates resulting in minor property damage and injuries to staff and inmates. After four days of rioting, the prison resumed routine operations, although the prison laundry was eventually closed on a permanent basis as a result of the riot.

Further expansions to the prison infrastructure began in 1986 with the implementation of an aggressive construction and renovation plan for the prison beginning with the construction of a 28-bed infirmary and outpatient medical services building. Within the next seven years, the North Carolina General Assembly approved approximately $25 million in additional funding for renovations and infrastructure improvements to the facility including repair or replacement of deteriorated buildings and the addition of support services necessitated by inmate population growth including the construction of six new dormitories, 48-cell maximum security housing unit, inmate mental health facility, prison operations building and gatehouse, security perimeter fence, and lighting.

In 1996, the position of prison superintendent at North Carolina Correctional Institution for Women was elevated to Warden, and Carol Caldwell became the first woman to serve as prison warden in North Carolina history. NCCIW was featured in two episodes of MSNBC's Lockup documentary series.

== Notable inmates ==
- Crystal Mangum, American murderer responsible for making false rape allegations in the Duke lacrosse case
- Blanche Taylor Moore, convicted murderer on death row at NCCIW
- Barbara Stager, convicted murderer serving life imprisonment following commutation of death sentence

=== Former inmates ===
- Janet Danahey, convicted mass murderer serving a life sentence for committing the Campus Walk Apartment fire.

== See also ==
- List of North Carolina state prisons
