= CHYDARU =

Former experimental youth prison in the US

Coordinates: 35.893637°N 79.0160624°W

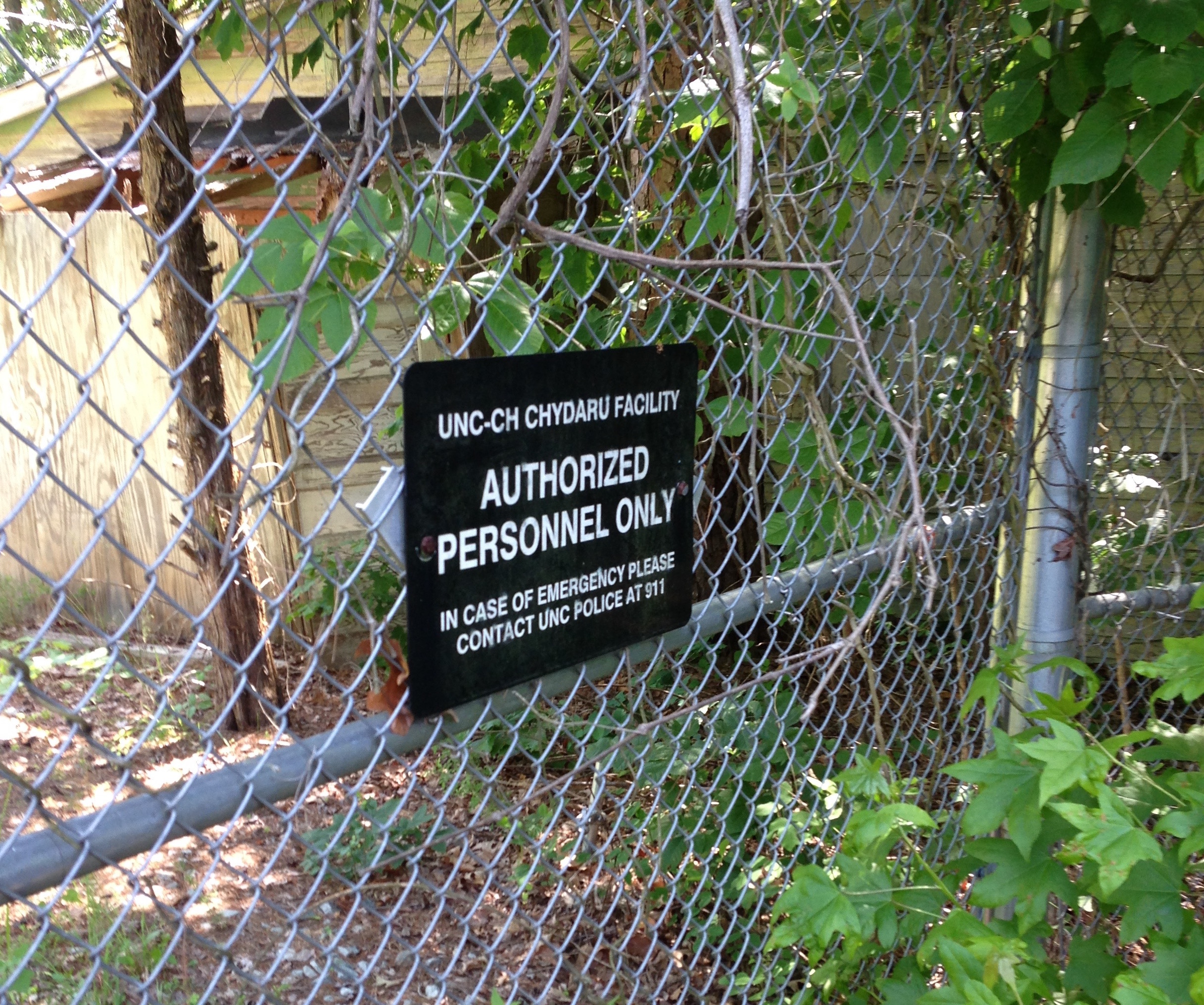
One of several identical signs mounted on the fence surrounding the camp

CHYDARU, unabbreviated name Chapel Hill Youth Development and Research Unit, was an experimental youth prison operated by the Institute of Government at the University of North Carolina at Chapel Hill and the North Carolina prison system. Built in 1945, it opened as a prison for youth under the age of 18 on May 1, 1964. The project was described as an advancement in prison structure. It closed later in 1965 due to budget shortages. Sometime during the 1970s (presumably 1973) it housed the Bureau of School Services, which was operated by UNC. Later in 1975, it was repurposed to store radioactive waste. As of 1996, it became exclusively a radioactive storage-for-decay facility, where short-lived radioactive wastes are stored until they are no longer radioactive, at which point they are removed. It is inspected annually by the state government.

== Buildings in CHYDARU ==
CHYDARU has 7 buildings located within its fence that are officially mapped and documented. There are 10 shelters included ones that have not been documented officially. Supposedly another building was destructed in 1985, but there is little evidence that it actually existed other than a crude map from 1977.

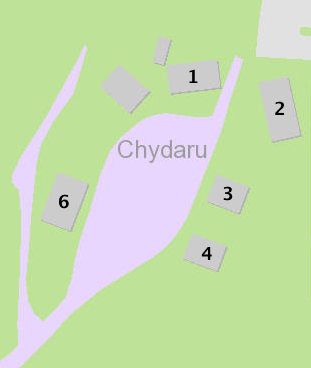
Map of CHYDARU, with labelled with annex numbers

=== Annex #1 ===
Known also as "Shed at Chydaru", the shed it mostly open to the air except for one room with a desk and a one way mirror looking inwards. There is no official documentation on its purpose.

=== Annex #2 ===
Annex #2 is also known as the "Radiation Annex", it was built in 1935 and listed as a shed or trailer officially. A worn sign on the front of the building mentions the Department of Environment. A newer sign below the older sign says OCCUPATIONAL SAFETY AND HEALTH EDUCATIONAL RESOURCE CENTER ANNEX.

=== Annex #3 and #4 ===
UNC named the buildings "Extension Annex A" and "Extension Annex B", respectively. It was constructed in 1945, as many other building were. Both buildings have a bathroom built for several people and room for beds. This leads many to believe that the prisoners were housed in each building. There is little difference between the two and they are located next to each other.

=== Annex #6 ===
Annex #6 is a two story building with a basement and ground floor. Built in 1945, there is no documentation for what it was ever used for.

=== Aviary ===
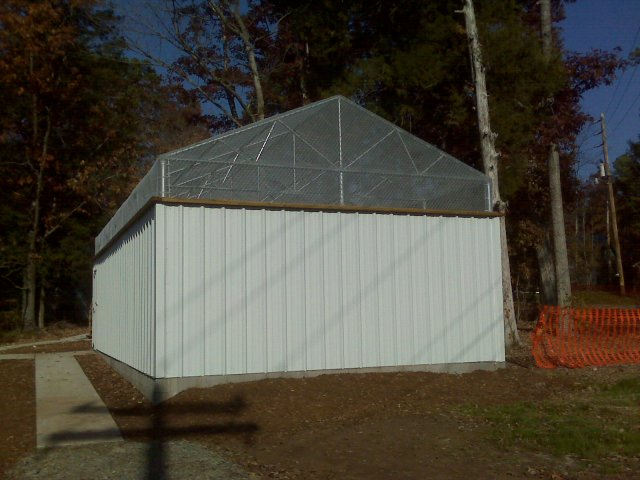
The aviary in 2006 when construction was completed

In 2006, an aviary was constructed along with an adjacent trailer in front of Annex #6. There is evidence that it was inhabited up to 2013. The UNC Satellite Facility Disaster Plan mentions that the aviary is near open water and not very high elevation, making it more likely for a natural disaster to effect it.

== See also ==
- List of North Carolina state prisons
