= The Tolerance, Equality, and Awareness Movement =

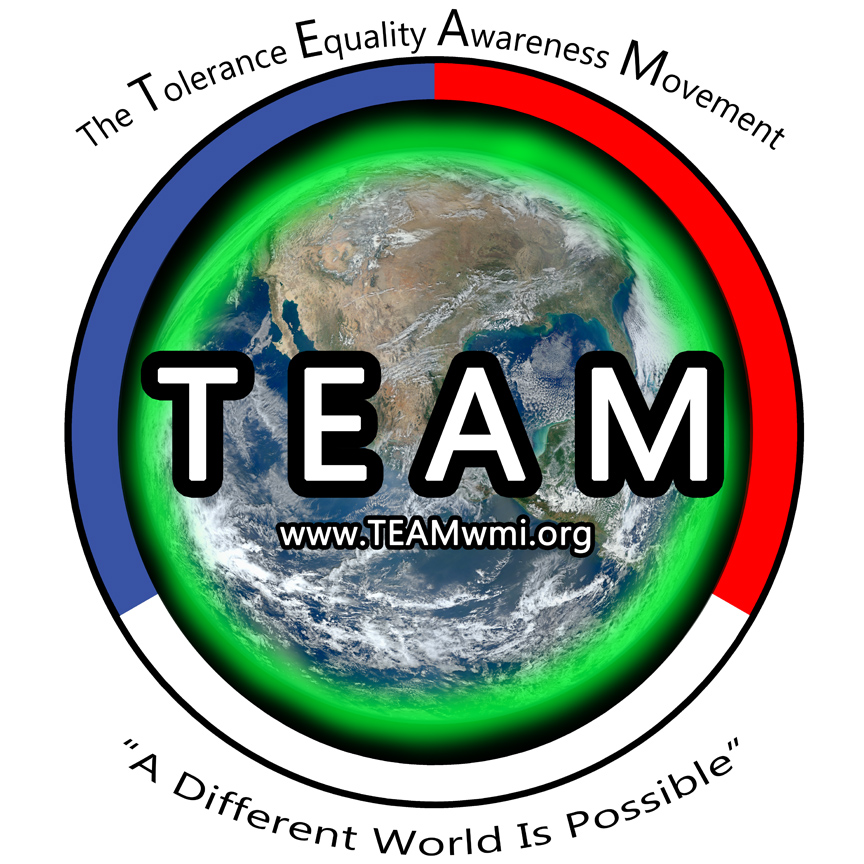
- Abbreviation: TEAM
- Formation: March 31, 2010; 16 years ago
- Type: 501(c)(3)
- Legal status: Tax-exempt Nonprofit Corporation
- Headquarters: Grand Rapids, Michigan, United States
- Members: Public
- Board President: Christopher Surfus
- Key people: Christopher Surfus, Alexandra Minor, Brianna Schmidt, Mark Hitz, and Caleb Hartmann.
- Website: teamwmi.org

The Tolerance, Equality, and Awareness Movement, known by the acronym TEAM, is a federally tax-exempt human rights organization. TEAM is based in Grand Rapids, Michigan, and was founded by in 2009 by Chris Surfus. TEAM was incorporated in 2010 and became a 501(c)(3) federally tax-exempt nonprofit in 2011 through Internal Revenue Service classification as a public charity.

The Tolerance, Equality, and Awareness Movement organized the July 2011 candlelight vigil at Ah-Nab-Awen Park in Grand Rapids, MI for the mass murder victims and families, which made international news. The 2011 Grand Rapids mass murder were committed by Rodrick Dantzler, who ultimately committed suicide after a standoff with Grand Rapids Public Safety. Vigil assistance was provided by the American Red Cross and Grand Rapids Public Safety. In addition, TEAM organized a counter-protest against the Westboro Baptist Church's planned picketing of United States First Lady Betty Ford's Funeral and TEAMwork: A Night of Dance and Drag for Diversity at The Pyramid Scheme nightclub and music venue in Grand Rapids.

== History ==
The Tolerance, Equality, and Awareness Movement was originally a Facebook group, started in response to LGBT and racial discrimination experienced by several members at a Grandville, MI business. Facebook became one of the major platforms to spread the organization's mission on human rights. TEAM formally incorporated on March 31, 2010.

TEAM focused initially on educational events, like discussion panels and lectures, without funding from any sources. TEAM uses three Facebook pages to promote its organization, with approximately 4,000 followers.

The organization has done the following, according to its website, a Holland Sentinel article, and interviews with the Grand Rapids LGBT History Project, Speak Up! Panel Project Series, Anti-bullying Program (which includes addressing local school districts), Diversity and Inclusion Program, Nondiscrimination policy work, general outreach at community events, participation in the Grand Rapids LGBT History Project, and providing disaster relief services.

== Recognition ==
The Tolerance, Equality, and Awareness Movement was recognized by the City of Grand Rapids Board of Commissioners as a nonprofit organization in March 2012.
