= North Carolina Wing Civil Air Patrol =

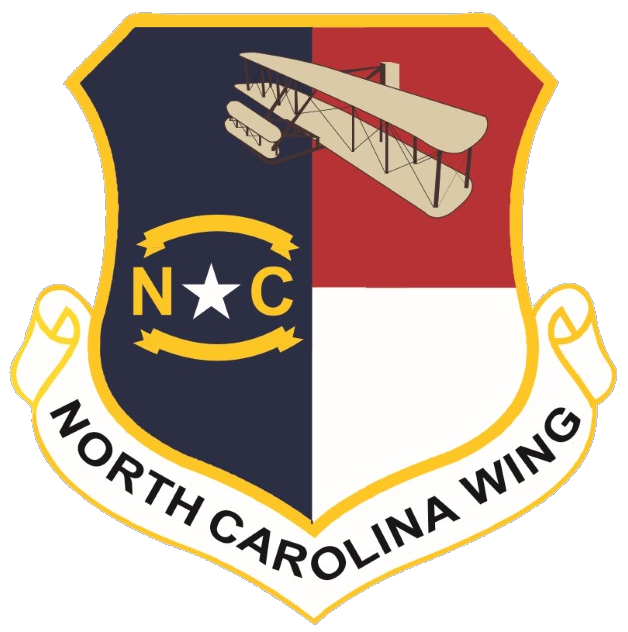
- North Carolina Wing of Civil Air Patrol

Associated branches
- United States Air Force

Command staff
- Commander: Col Brendan Kearns
- Senior Enlisted Leader: CMSgt Christopher Cozzi
- Deputy Commander: Lt Col Craig Richardson & James Fitzpatrick
- Chief of Staff: Maj Brent Wooters

Current statistics
- Cadets: 1505
- Seniors: 1058
- Total Membership: 2563
- Website: ncwg.cap.gov
- Statistics as of October 30, 2026

The North Carolina Wing of the Civil Air Patrol is headquartered in Burlington, North Carolina. It serves to administer the operation of the volunteers within the state to accomplish the three congressionally mandated missions of the organization: 1) Emergency Services, 2) Cadet Programs, and 3) Aerospace Education.

== History ==
The North Carolina Wing was created on December 9, 1941, by Governor J. Melville Broughton, and the Wing held its first meeting on December 30 of that year. By the end of January 1942, the wing had approximately 350 members and over one hundred aircraft. During World War II, the North Carolina Wing was responsible for assisting in fighting a forest fire, dropping paper bombs to simulate air raids, conducting evaluation flights during blackout drills, and spotting U-boats off the North Carolina shore.

In May 2020, members of the North Carolina Wing were activated to support North Carolina's response to the 2020 coronavirus pandemic. North Carolina Wing members staffed two North Carolina Department of Emergency Management field warehouses, providing logistics and administrative support. Members also conducted transport missions in support of the North Carolina Department of Emergency Management. By 6 May 2020, North Carolina Wing members had conducted over 500 transport missions, totaling over 40,000 miles of intrastate travel. In March 2021, members of North Carolina Wing provided support at vaccine points of distribution.

== Squadrons in North Carolina Wing ==
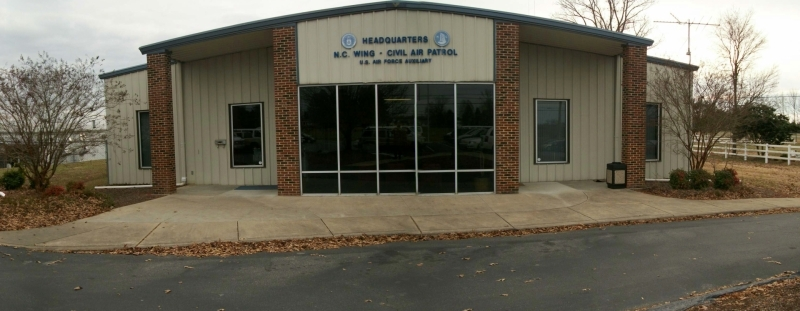
The North Carolina Wing Civil Air Patrol Headquarters.

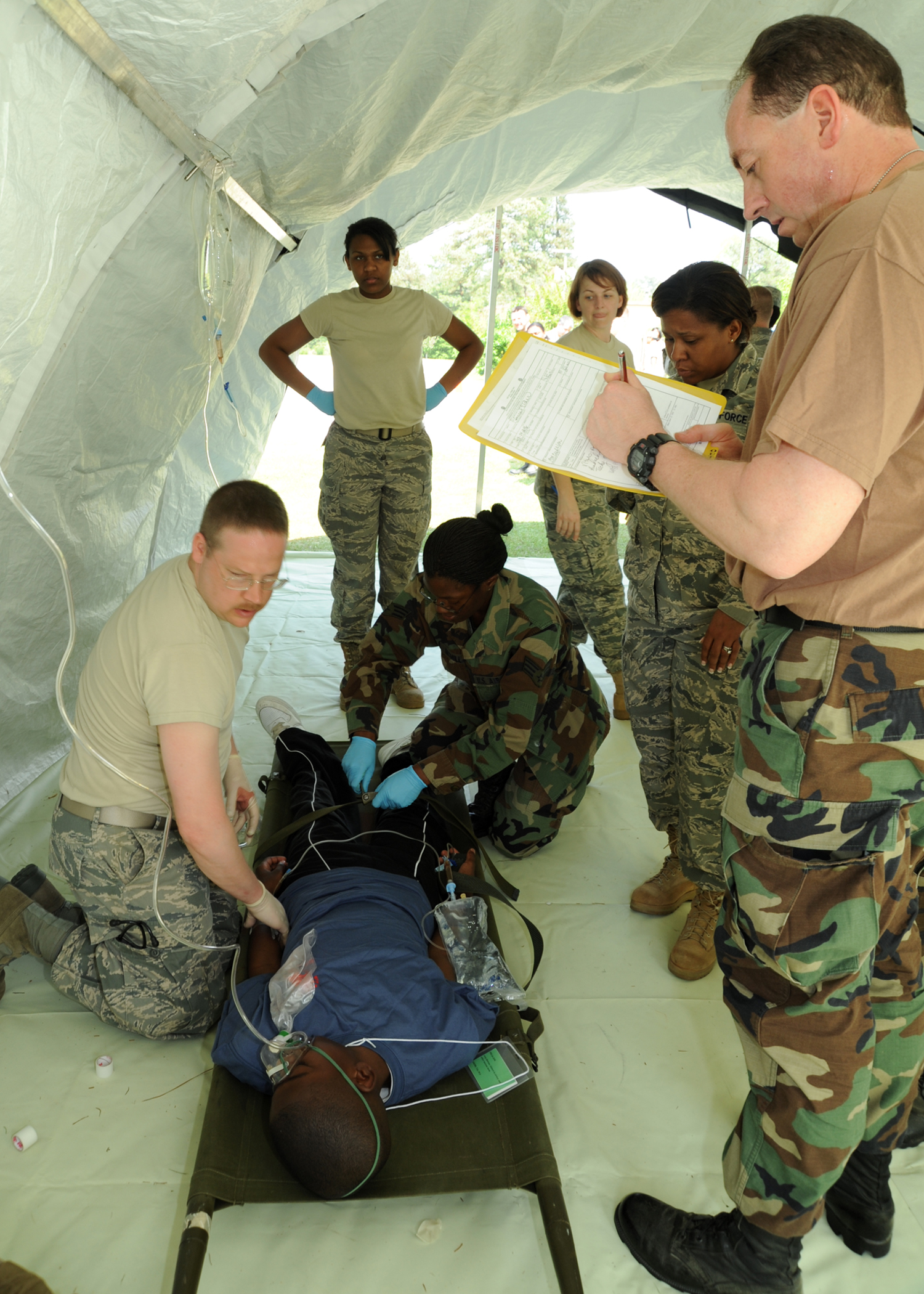
A medical team from the 440th Airlift Wing Medical Squadron responds to a North Carolina CAP cadet playing a head trauma victim during a mass casualty exercise at Pope Air Force Base, N.C.

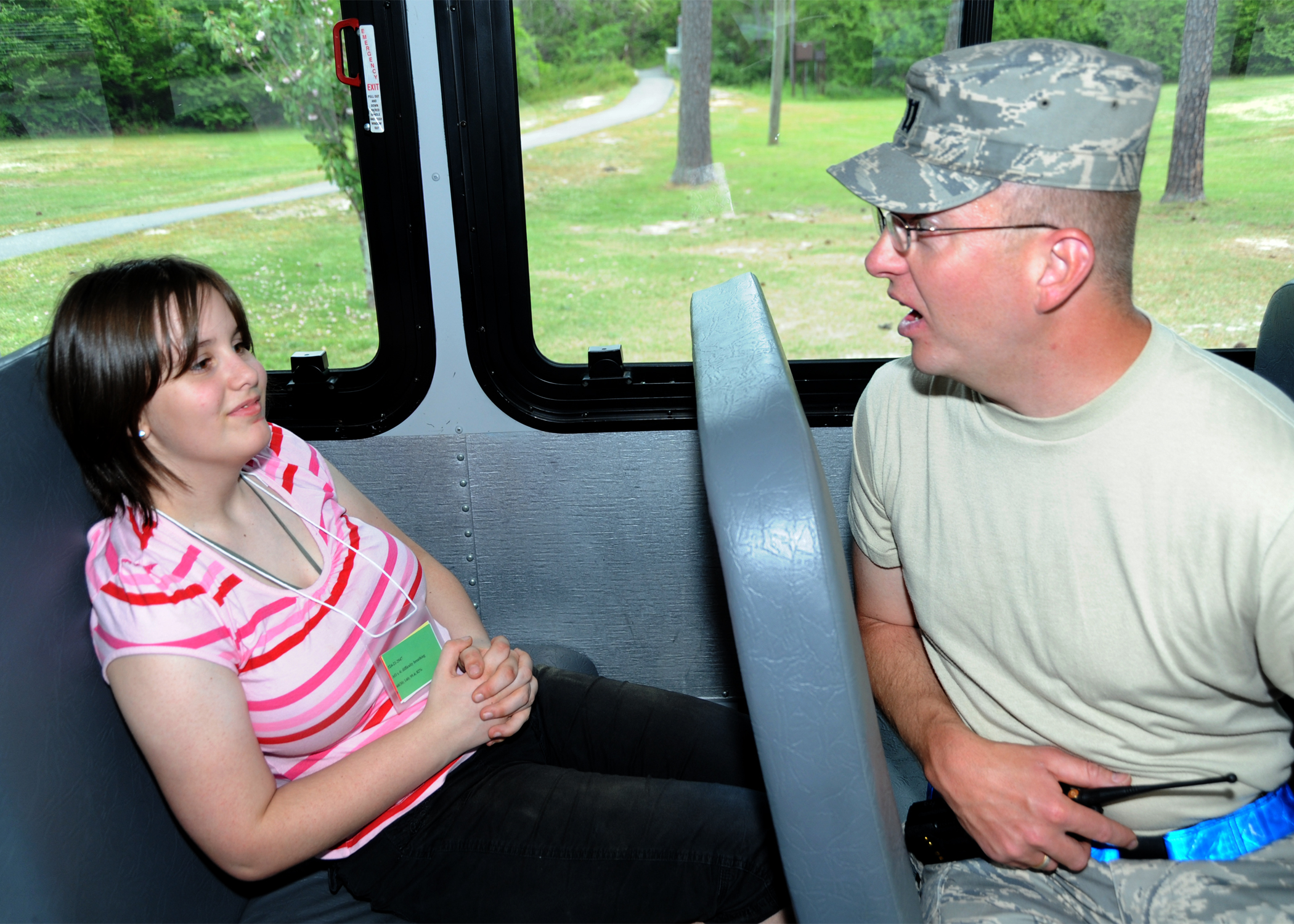
Captain Hoyer, 440th Airlift Wing Medical Squadron, offers some acting advice to 15 year old Civil Air Patrol Cadet Candra Wilson during a mass casualty exercise.

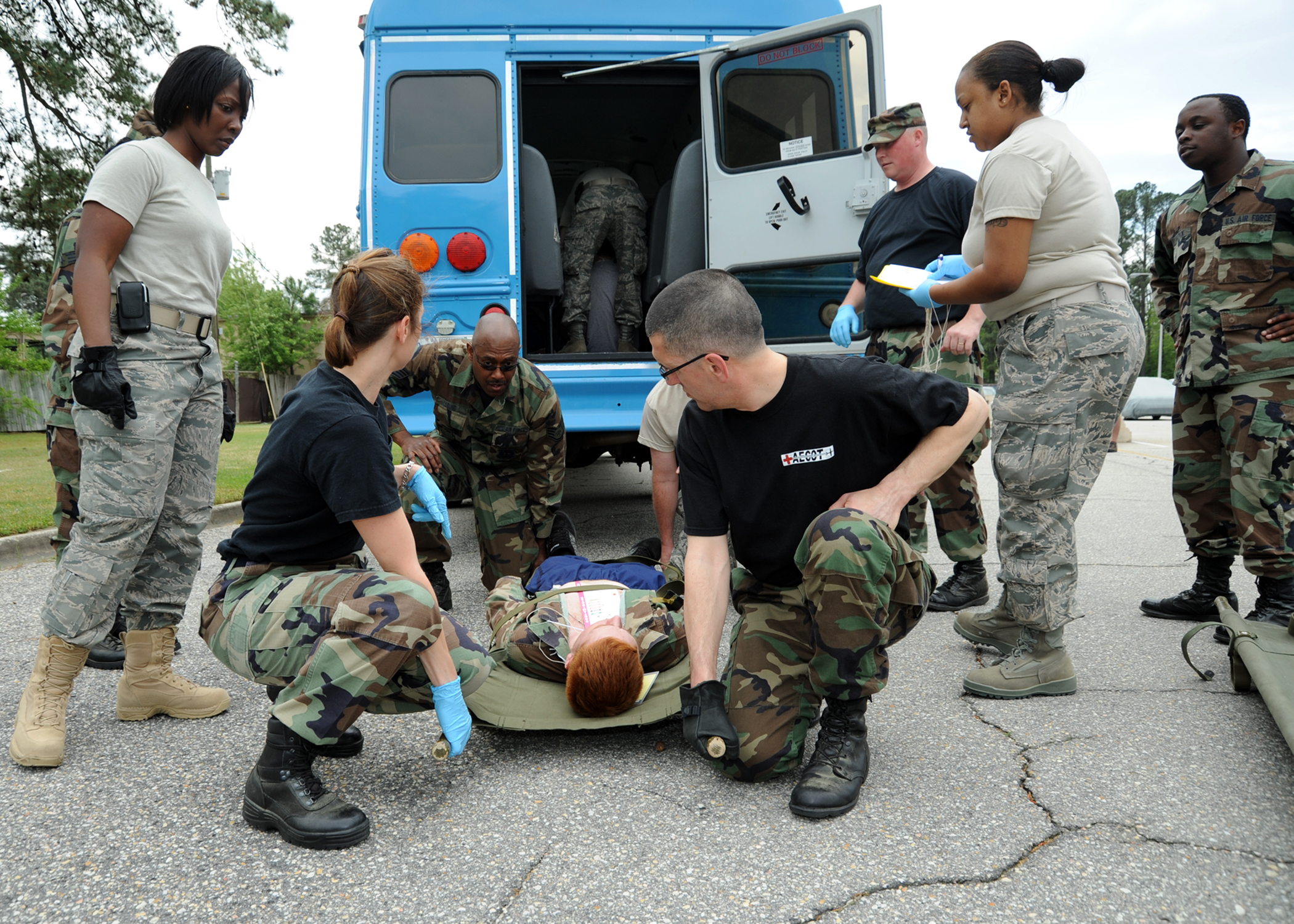
The 440th Airlift Wing Medical Squadron removes a North Carolina CAP cadet playing a crash victim from a bus during a mass casualty exercise.

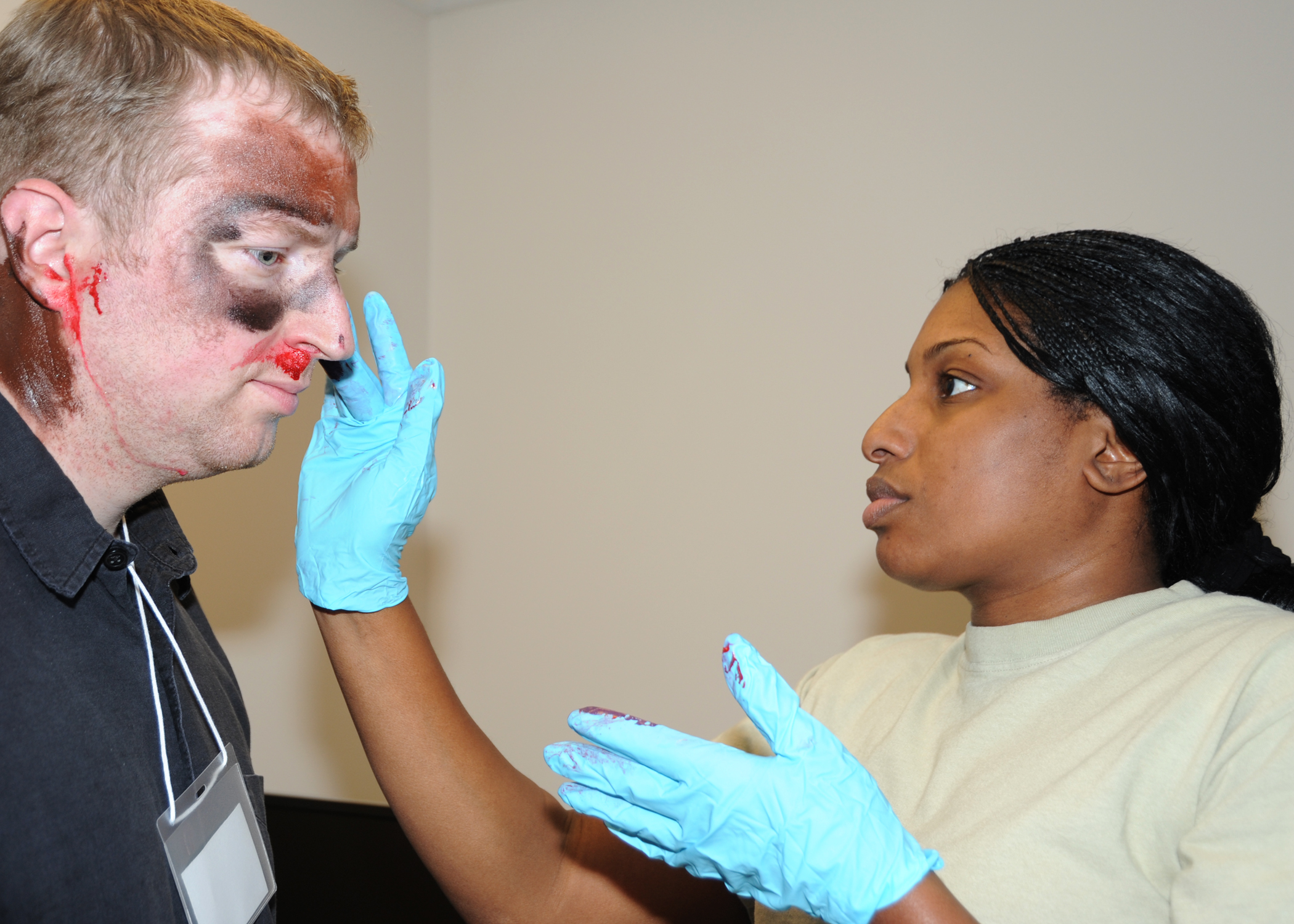
Senior Airman Lisa Sam, a medical technician with the 440th Airlift Wing Medical Squadron applies paint to the face of Aaron Schaak, a North Carolina CAP cadet, before a Mass Casualty exercise.

North Carolina Wing has thirty composite, senior, or cadet squadrons as well as four senior flights chartered in the state and assigned to one of six groups. There are also three non-standard squadrons (000, 001, and 999) under North Carolina Wing Headquarters.

Unit Name	Charter Number	Location	Unit Emblem
NCWG headquarters	MAR-NC-001	Burlington	
Legislative Senior Squadron	MAR-NC-999	Willow Spring, NC	
Inactive Members	MAR-NC-000	No specific location	
Group 1 Headquarters	MAR-NC-011	Boone	
Asheville Composite Squadron	MAR-NC-019	Asheville	
Gastonia Composite Squadron	MAR-NC-024	Gastonia	
Shelby Composite Squadron	MAR-NC-050	Shelby	
Hickory Composite Squadron	MAR-NC-124	Hickory	
Boone Composite Squadron	MAR-NC-153	Boone	
Group 2 Headquarters	MAR-NC-002	Cary, NC	
Burlington Composite Squadron	MAR-NC-022	Burlington	
Raleigh-Wake Composite Squadron	MAR-NC-048	Raleigh	
Randolph Composite Squadron	MAR-NC-107	Asheboro	
Franklin County Composite Squadron	MAR-NC-145	Louisburg	
Orange County Composite Squadron	MAR-NC-150	Hillsborough	
Apex Cadet Squadron	MAR-NC-301	Cary	
Group 3 Headquarters	MAR-NC-003	Greenville	
Tar River Composite Squadron	MAR-NC-057	Elm City	
Pitt-Greenville Composite Squadron	MAR-NC-079	Greenville	
Goldsboro Composite Squadron	MAR-NC-126	Seymour Johnson AFB	
Cunningham Field Composite Squadron	MAR-NC-160	MCAS Cherry Point	
Halifax Composite Squadron	MAR-NC-169	Roanoke Rapids	
Elizabeth City Composite Squadron	MAR-NC-305	Elizabeth City	
Group 4 Headquarters	MAR-NC-004	Indian Trail	
Guilford Composite Squadron	MAR-NC-307	Greensboro	
Winston-Salem Composite Squadron	MAR-NC-082	Winston-Salem	
111th SAR Cadet Squadron	MAR-NC-111	Charlotte	
Charlotte Senior Squadron	MAR-NC-121	Concord	
South Piedmont Senior Squadron	MAR-NC-137	Indian Trail	
Iredell Composite Squadron	MAR-NC-162	Statesville	
Union County Composite Squadron	MAR-NC-300	Waxhaw	
Group 5 Headquarters	MAR-NC-005	Fayetteville	
Fayetteville Composite Squadron	MAR-NC-007	Pope AFB	
Cape Fear Composite Squadron	MAR-NC-023	Wilmington	
Johnston County Composite Squadron	MAR-NC-143	Smithfield	
Brunswick County Composite Squadron	MAR-NC-170	Oak Island	
Sandhills Senior Squadron	MAR-NC-171	Fayetteville	
Sugar Valley Composite Squadron	MAR-NC-052	Farmington	
Dan River Composite Squadron	MAR-NC-070	Stoneville	

== North Carolina Wing Aircraft ==
North Carolina Wing has ten aircraft based in the state. They are kept in a state of readiness to respond to emergency services missions and are positioned based on need and availability of pilots. Major aircraft maintenance is performed centrally at Sanford Airport (TTA) while minor maintenance and repairs are performed at basing locations as required. Aircraft are also used to provide orientation flights to cadets and develop proficiency and training of CAP pilots.

Aircraft type	N-number	CAP call sign	Regular Basing
Cessna C172S	N916CP	CAP3202	Southport(SUT)/Fayetteville(FAY)
Cessna C172P	N9841L	CAP3203	Halifax(IXA)/Pitt-Greenville(PGV)
Cessna C172P	N99162	CAP3204	Southport(SUT)
Cessna C172P	N99832	CAP3205	Concord(JQF)
Cessna C172P	N99885	CAP3207	Concord(JQF)
Cessna C182T (G1000)	N716CP	CAP3208	Burlington(BUY)
Cessna C182T (G1000)	N963CP	CAP3209	Raleigh-Durham(RDU)
Cessna C172R	N991CP	CAP3210	Asheville(AVL)
Cessna C182R	N9930E	CAP3230	Triangle North Executive (KLHZ)
Cessna C182T (G1000)	N727CP	CAP3212	Asheville(AVL)

== Legal Protection ==
The North Carolina state Legislature passed H.B. 600 in 2023 to provide legal protection to members in North Carolina.

== See also ==
- North Carolina Air National Guard
- North Carolina State Defense Militia
