= 2011 Grand Rapids shootings =

Spree shooting in Michigan, U.S.

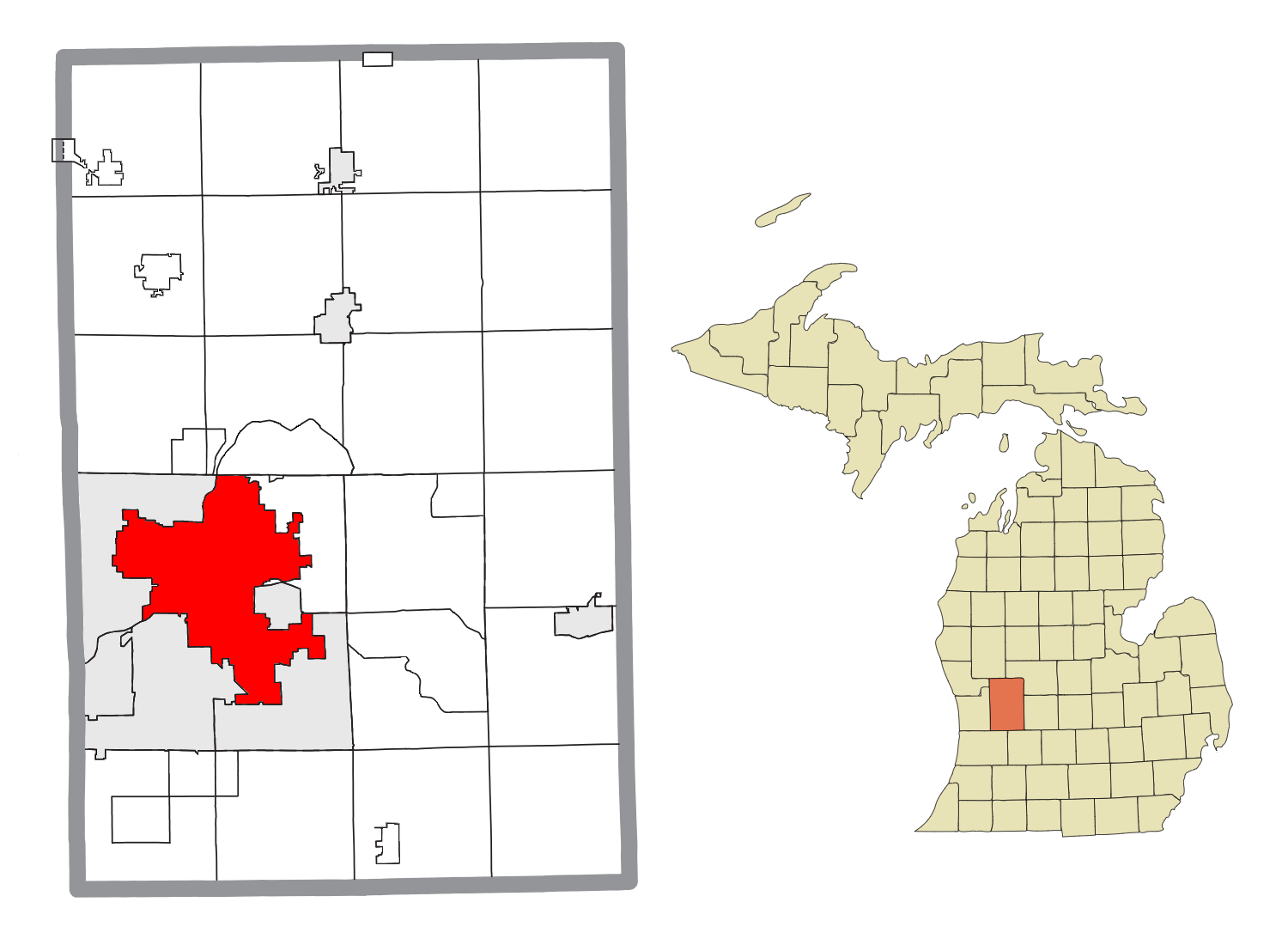
- Location within the state of Michigan
- Location: Grand Rapids, Michigan
- Date: July 7, 2011; 15 years ago c. 2:30 p.m. – 11:30 p.m. (EST; UTC−05:00)
- Attack type: Spree shooting; murder-suicide; hostage taking; mass shooting; pedicide; uxoricide; shootout
- Weapon: 9mm Glock 19 semi-automatic pistol
- Deaths: 8 (including the perpetrator)
- Injuries: 2
- Perpetrator: Rodrick Shonte Dantzler

On July 7, 2011, 34-year-old Rodrick Shonte Dantzler killed seven people and wounded two others in a spree shooting in Grand Rapids, Michigan. The killings occurred in two homes, with the two non-fatal gunshot injuries taking place on the road. Dantzler was pursued by police on a lengthy car chase which eventually left his vehicle disabled in a highway woodline and after holding hostages in a nearby house for several hours, took his own life. Those killed included Dantzler's estranged wife, their daughter, his former girlfriend, and members of the other victims' families. One of the non-fatal victims was also acquainted with Dantzler.

== Events ==
=== Shooting spree ===
The spree began with the murders of seven victims in two separate homes. One of the shootings happened in a house on Plainfield Avenue NE, in which Dantzler's former girlfriend, her sister, and her sister's 10-year-old daughter were killed. Another shooting occurred at a house on Brynell Court NE, in which Dantzler's estranged wife, their daughter, and his wife's parents (the homeowners), were killed, and an empty twelve round magazine was found at the scene.

The police became involved when Dantzler's mother called police around 2:30 p.m., reporting that her son had called her to say he had shot his wife. Police went to his house on Janes Avenue NE, where he lived alone since his wife and daughter moved out, but found no one. Shortly afterward, the murder scenes on Plainfield Avenue and Brynell Court were discovered. Police arrived at the various scenes, closing down streets in the area, and telling area residents to stay inside their homes.

Another victim was shot in an apparently random road rage incident near Godfrey Avenue and Oxford Street SW at 3:00 p.m. The victim, Robert Poore, was spared serious injury as the bullet was deflected by a titanium plate in his nose. At this point, Dantzler was driving a Lincoln Town Car. He later abandoned that car and carjacked a Chevrolet Suburban.

=== Standoff and Dantzler's suicide ===
At about 7:00 p.m., April Swanson, a friend of Dantzler, called police to report that he was following her car. He shot her from his vehicle at Fulton Street and Division Avenue, with the woman suffering a serious but non-life-threatening arm injury. He also fired into a passing pickup truck but no passengers were injured. Police intervened by ramming Dentzler's vehicle, and they exchanged gunfire; no officers were shot. The suspect was chased by police, who attempted to disable his vehicle as he drove through downtown Grand Rapids, prior to briefly taking Interstate 196 west to northbound US 131. Dantzler then turned onto eastbound Interstate 96, where he crossed the median and continued eastward on the westbound lanes, and crashed into a freeway ditch around 7:15 p.m.

At this point, he exited his vehicle and ran on foot, entering a residence on Rickman Avenue NE in the northeastern part of Grand Rapids, not far from the killings on Brynell Court. He held Joyce Bean, her significant other Steve Helderman, and Meg Holmes hostage; Dantzler had no connection to them. Joyce Bean, who was 53 years old, was released from the house at about 9:30 p.m. after Dantzler was given cigarettes and Gatorade by police. Dantzler continued negotiations with police, at which point he was distraught and contemplating suicide. At 11:30 p.m., he fatally shot himself in the head while hiding in a closet with Helderman, who turned his head just before the shot, so as not to see it. Holmes was also still in the room.

Police believe that he was "hunting" his former girlfriends and that the pending separation from his wife was the reason for the shooting spree. Police said that Dantzler was carrying a large amount of ammunition.

== Victims ==
Dantzler killed seven people in two homes. At the home on Plainfield Avenue, he killed 27-year-old Amanda Emkens along with her 10-year-old daughter Marisa Emkens and her 23-year-old sister Kimberlee Emkens. Kimberlee Emkens was a former girlfriend of Dantzler, although the two had not been in recent contact. At the home on Brynell Court, the suspect killed 29-year-old Jennifer Heeren and her parents Thomas Heeren, 51, and Rebecca Heeren, 52. Dantzler also killed his own 12-year-old daughter, Kamrie. Jennifer Heeren was the estranged wife of Dantzler and mother of Kamrie. The suspect's relationship with Heeren was abusive.

== Perpetrator ==
Rodrick Shonte Dantzler (March 8, 1977 - July 7, 2011), a 34-year-old building technician from Grand Rapids, was identified as the perpetrator. Dantzler was convicted as a juvenile for burglary in 1992, when he was 15 years old. During his childhood, Dantzler was without his father and lived with his stepfather who had used drugs. In 1995, his mother Victoria Dantzler kicked him out of the house at the age of 18 and filed a protection order against him. In addition, three other women had filed protection orders against Dantzler due to his threatening to abuse them and their property. Also in 1995, Dantzler set fire to his mother's house. In 1997, he was convicted of domestic violence and destroying property. Dantzler was charged with assault in 2000 in which he was involved in shooting someone in a road rage incident; he was sentenced to 3 to 10 years in prison. In prison, Dantzler took part in programs to prevent anger and got the equivalent of a high school diploma. He was released from prison in 2005.

Following his release, Dantzler was said to be bipolar and not taking his medication. He was also said to be getting disability money for his bipolar disorder. In 2010, Dantzler was charged with assault and battery, being sentenced to prison for a year. His mother described Dantzler as having "a very explosive temper and will act violently without thinking." Dantzler also used cocaine and alcohol the day of the shooting and was known to abuse alcohol. A few days before the shooting, Dantzler took his wife and daughter to Michigan's Adventure outside of Muskegon. During the week prior to the shooting, Dantzler's wife, Jennifer Heeren, was planning to separate from him and was reported to not be staying in the same house as Dantzler.

Initial reports stated the handgun used in the shooting spree was a .40-caliber, but police later identified it as a 9mm Glock 19 pistol. The pistol was reported stolen two years earlier from a home northeast of Grand Rapids. It is unclear how Dantzler got the gun.

== Aftermath ==
On the morning of July 8, 2011, flowers and other items were left outside of the home on Plainfield Avenue where the shootings occurred. Several residents expressed their grief concerning the murders onto MyGR6, a social media initiative sponsored by Amway, as well as praise on the Facebook page of the Grand Rapids Police Department. In addition, a thank you note was written in sidewalk chalk outside the Grand Rapids Police Department. Huntington Bank is also taking donations for the families of the shooting victims. Hundreds of people attended a vigil for the shooting victims at Ah-Nab-Awen Park, near the Gerald R. Ford Presidential Museum, on the night of July 8, 2011. The candlelight vigil was organized by The Tolerance, Equality, and Awareness Movement, a tax-exempt human rights organization in Grand Rapids. A benefit was held July 9 to raise money for the funeral of the victims of the Emkens family. On July 12, 2011, Grand Rapids mayor George Heartwell honored the Grand Rapids Police Department for their handling of the situation.

A community church service for the victims was held on July 13, 2011, at Second Congregational Church, with approximately 200 people attending. The funeral service for the three members of the Emkens family killed was held on July 13, 2011, at St. Jude Catholic Church while the funeral for the four Heeren family members that were killed was held on July 15, 2011, at Sunshine Community Church. In addition, the funeral for Dantzler was held on July 15, 2011, at Ivy K. Gillespie Moody Memorial Chapel.

== In popular culture ==
The dashboard camera footage of the chase between Dantzler and the Grand Rapids Police Department was featured on an episode of the 2012 version of World's Wildest Police Videos. The part where he takes hostages and releases them is cut, as it skips to the part when Dantzler shoots himself in the head.

== See also ==
- List of homicides in Michigan
- List of rampage killers in the United States
