= North Carolina Alcoholic Beverage Control Commission =

The North Carolina Alcoholic Beverage Control Commission is an agency of the government of North Carolina within the state's Department of Public Safety.

The Alcoholic Beverage Control bill, submitted to the state legislature in 1937, was enacted into law; it provided for the establishment of a State Board of Control, consisting of a chairman and two associate members who would be appointed by the Governor. That Board is now known as the North Carolina Alcoholic Beverage Commission.

North Carolina is considered an alcoholic beverage control state as well as a local option state, as each county or city's voters decide whether alcohol shall be sold. There are 49 county and 106 municipal alcoholic beverage control boards across the state that sell spirits; sales of other alcoholic beverages are allowed or disallowed by the towns or counties.

State regulations require that each beer or wine product be approved by the commission before being sold in North Carolina.

The Commission publishes the North Carolina Liquor Quarterly, which includes advertisements for alcoholic beverages and a list of the state's uniform prices for spirits.

== History ==
In 1935, the North Carolina General Assembly authorized the governor to create a commission to study methods for controlling alcoholic beverages. In 1937, the assembly passed the Alcoholic Beverage Control Act. The law granted the state government a monopoly over the distribution of certain alcoholic beverages and created a State Board of Alcoholic Control, comprising a chairman and two additional members to be appointed by the governor. In practice, this structure led to the chairman of the board also serving as its full-time administrator. In 1965, new legislation altered the structure of the board, enlarging it to five members and providing for the governor to appoint a director with the approval of the board to serve as its administrator.

== Structure and function ==
The Alcoholic Beverage Control Commission is organized under the North Carolina Department of Public Safety. It derives its authority from Chapter 18B of the North Carolina General Statutes. It is responsible for regulating the sale, purchase, transportation, manufacture, consumption and possession of alcoholic beverages in the state. The commission holds monthly meetings. The state hosts 171 local ABC boards.

== Works cited ==
- Sanders, John L. (September 1965). "State Government". Popular Government. Vol. 32, no. 1. University of North Carolina Institute of Government. pp. 3–8, 79.
