= List of North Carolina state prisons =

This is a list of state prisons in the U.S. state of North Carolina:

In January 2015, the former five male divisions and one female division were consolidated into four regions, as listed below. As of February 2015, North Carolina houses about 38,000 offenders in 56 correctional institutions.

== Central Region ==
Name	Capacity
Columbus Correctional Institution	698
Davidson Correctional Center	258
Forsyth Correctional Center	248
Lanesboro Correctional Institution	1,800
Lumberton Correctional Institution	768
New Hanover Correctional Center	334
Pender Correctional Center	740
Piedmont Correctional Institution	952
Randolph Correctional Center	226
Richmond Correctional Institution	801
Sampson Correctional Institution	452
Scotland Correctional Institution	1,756
Southern Correctional Institution	624
Tabor Correctional Institution	1,700

== Coastal Region ==
Name	Capacity
Bertie Correctional Institution	1,400
Carteret Correctional Center	300
Craven Correctional Institution	796
Eastern Correctional Institution	429
Greene Correctional Institution	616
Hyde Correctional Institution	736
Maury Correctional Institution	896
Odom Correctional Institution	352
Pamlico Correctional Institution	552
Pasquotank Correctional Institution	896
Roanoke River Correctional Institution	1,038
Tyrrell Prison Work Farm	620

== Mountain Region ==
Name	Capacity
Albemarle Correctional Institution	816
Alexander Correctional Institution	1,180
Avery Mitchell Correctional Institution	816
Brown Creek Correctional Institution	1,204
Caldwell Correctional Center	238
Catawba Correctional Center	246
Craggy Correctional Center	408
Foothills Correctional Institution	858
Gaston Correctional Center	242
Lincoln Correctional Center	236
Marion Correctional Institution	738
Mountain View Correctional Institution	884
Rutherford Correctional Center	236
Western Correctional Center for Women	366
Wilkes Correctional Center	262

== Triangle Region ==
Name	Capacity
Caswell Correctional Center	460
Central Prison	1,104
Dan River Prison Work Farm	640
Franklin Correctional Center	452
Granville Correctional Institution	904
Harnett Correctional Institution	954
Johnston Correctional Institution	612
Nash Correctional Institution	512
Neuse Correctional Institution	816
North Carolina Correctional Institution for Women	1,288
Orange Correctional Center	200
Sanford Correctional Center	298
Wake Correctional Center	414
Warren Correctional Institution	809

== Renamed Prisons ==
In 2021, five facilities were renamed because their previous names were explicitly associated with racism or slavery. The Roanoke River Correctional Institution was previously the Caledonia Correctional Institution, also known as the Caledonia State Prison Farm. The Western Correctional Center for Women was previously the Swannanoa Correctional Center for Women. The Granville Correctional Institution was previously the Polk Correctional Institution. The Richmond Correctional Institution was previously the Morrison Correction Institution. The DART Center in Goldsboro was previously the DART Cherry Facility.

== Closed Prisons ==
The following North Carolina state prisons have been closed or consolidated into other facilities.

- Alamance Correctional Center (closed October 2001)
- Alexander Correctional Center (December 1998)
- Anson CC (consolidated w/ Brown Creek CI) (December 2009)
- Avery Correctional Center (October 1999)
- Black Mountain Correctional Center for Women (July 2008)
- Bladen Correctional Center (October 2013)
- Blanch Youth Institution (formerly Ivy Bluff Prison) (September 1999)
- Blue Ridge Correctional Center (October 2002)
- Buncombe Correctional Center (consolidated with Craggy CC) (March 2014)
- Burke Youth Center (June 1992)
- Cabarrus Correctional Center (December 2011)
- Charlotte Correctional Center (December 2011)
- Chapel Hill Youth Development and Research Unit (1965)
- Old Craggy Prison (1989)
- Cleveland Correctional Center (December 2009)
- Currituck Correctional Center (August 2000)
- Davie Correctional Center (October 1997)
- Duplin Correctional Center (August 2013)
- Durham Correctional Center (October 2011)
- Fountain Correctional Center For Women (December 2014)
- Gates Correctional Center (October 2009)
- Goldsboro Correctional Center (August 1999)
- Granville Correctional Center (October 1996)
- Guilford Correctional Center (October 2009)
- Halifax Correctional Center (October 1996)
- Haywood Correctional Center (November 2011)
- Henderson Correctional Center (October 2002)
- Iredell Correctional Center (October 1999)
- IMPACT East (now Morrison minimum unit) (August 2002)
- IMPACT West (now Foothills minimum unit) (August 2002)
- Martin Correctional Center (December 1998)
- McCain Correctional Hospital (April 2010)
- McDowell Correctional Center (consolidated w/ Marion CI) (July 1996)
- Mecklenburg Correctional Center (December 1998)
- Montgomery Correctional Center (consolidated w/ Southern CI) (1997)
- Moore Correctional Center (June 1995)
- Nash (minimum) Correctional Center (September 1999)
- North Piedmont Correctional Center for Women (August 2014)
- Person Correctional Center (September 1996)
- Polk Youth Center (Raleigh) (November 1997)
- Raleigh Correctional Center for Women (consolidated w/ NCCIW) (March 2014)
- Richmond Correctional Center (June 1995)
- Robeson Correctional Center (August 2013)
- Rockingham Correctional Center (September 1996)
- Rowan CC (consolidated w/ Piedmont CI) (December 2009)
- Sandhills Youth Center (June 2003)
- Sandy Ridge Correctional Center (December 1998)
- Scotland Correctional Center (November 2001)
- Stanly Correctional Center (July 1999)
- Stokes Correctional Center (October 1999)
- Tillery Correctional Center (consolidated with Caledonia CI) (August 2014)
- Triangle Correctional Center (August 1994)
- Umstead Correctional Center (November 2009)
- Union Correctional Center (October 2009)
- Vance Correctional Center (November 1996)
- Warren Correctional Center (May 1997)
- Washington Correctional Center (November 1996)
- Watauga Correctional Center (December 1998)
- Wayne Correctional Center (October 2013)
- Western Youth Institution (January 2014)
- Wilmington Residential Facility for Women (September 2009)
- Yadkin Correctional Center (September 1999)
- Yancey Correctional Center (July 1999)

== See also ==
- Lists of United States state prisons
