= North Carolina Department of Adult Correction =

- Patch for Division of Prisons

- Seal of North Carolina Department of Correction (circa 2005)
- Common name: North Carolina Department of Adult Correction
- Abbreviation: NCDAC

Agency overview
- Formed: 1925
- Employees: Approximately 14,000

Jurisdictional structure
- Operations jurisdiction: North Carolina, USA
- Area: 53,865 square miles (139,510 km^{2})
- Population: 9,222,414 (2008 est.)

Operational structure
- Headquarters: Raleigh, North Carolina
- Elected officer responsible: Josh Stein, Governor of North Carolina
- Agency executive: Leslie Cooley Dismukes, Secretary of Correction

Facilities
- Lockups: 31,400.

Website
- NCDAC Website

The North Carolina Department of Adult Correction (NCDAC) is the agency responsible for corrections in the U.S. state of North Carolina. NCDAC was formed as a cabinet level agency at the start of 2023, after corrections had been part of the North Carolina Department of Public Safety since 2012.

== History ==
In 1868, North Carolina adopted a new State Constitution that provided for building a state penitentiary. Inmates began building the state's first prison, Central Prison, in 1870, and moved into the completed castle-like structure in December 1884. In 1881, the state leased two tracts of land near Raleigh for inmates to farm. State law 379, enacted in 1885, provided for the allowance of good time as an incentive for inmate cooperation. In 1892, the state began running the Caledonia State Prison Farm on 7,500 acres, still in operation as of 2020.

In 1901, as demand for inmate labor dwindled from the private sector, the state legislature passed the Good Roads Policy, which legalized the use of inmate labor for the creation and maintenance of North Carolina roads. Horse drawn prison cages were moved from place to place to move the inmate labor force to areas needed for the road projects.

The agency was officially formed in 1925. The system then consisted of Central, Caledonia Farm, Camp Polk Farm, and six road working road camps. In March 1931, the state passed a road bill that imposed a gas tax, and consolidated responsibility for road maintenance at the state level. Because the state relied on convict labor for road construction and maintenance, the state prison agency and the state highway department were consolidated as a single entity, and the state now took responsibility for 51 county jails.

In 1957, the two departments were again separated. The same year, North Carolina became the first state to allow inmates employed in work-release programs to work outside the prison during the day. In 1967 the Department of State Prisons was renamed the Department of Correction.

== Facilities ==
As of March 2023, North Carolina houses about 31,000 people in 54 correctional institutions throughout the state.

== Operations ==
The State of North Carolina operates no private prison facilities. All prison facilities for state inmates are operated and controlled by the North Carolina Department of Adult Correction, Division of Institutions. From 1998 through 2000, the state had contracted with Corrections Corporation of America, which owned and operated Pamlico Correctional Institution in Bayboro, and the Mountain View Correctional Institution in Spruce Pine. North Carolina ended those contracts effective September 2000, and bought both facilities two years later. Rivers Correctional Institution, in unincorporated Hertford County, North Carolina, is operated by GEO Group under contract with the Federal Bureau of Prisons.

== Death row ==
The male death row is located at Central Prison. The female death row is located at the North Carolina Correctional Institution for Women. The execution chamber is located at Central Prison in Raleigh. There have been no executions in North Carolina since 2006.

== Fallen officers ==
Since the establishment of the North Carolina Department of Correction, 11 officers have died in the line of duty.

== See also ==
- List of North Carolina state prisons
- List of law enforcement agencies in North Carolina
- List of United States state correction agencies
- Prison

== Works cited ==
- Sawyer, Ann L. (1981). "Fifty Years of North Carolina State Government". Popular Government. Vol. 46, no. 3. UNC Institute of Government. pp. 4–10.
