= North Carolina Department of Public Safety =

State law enforcement agency

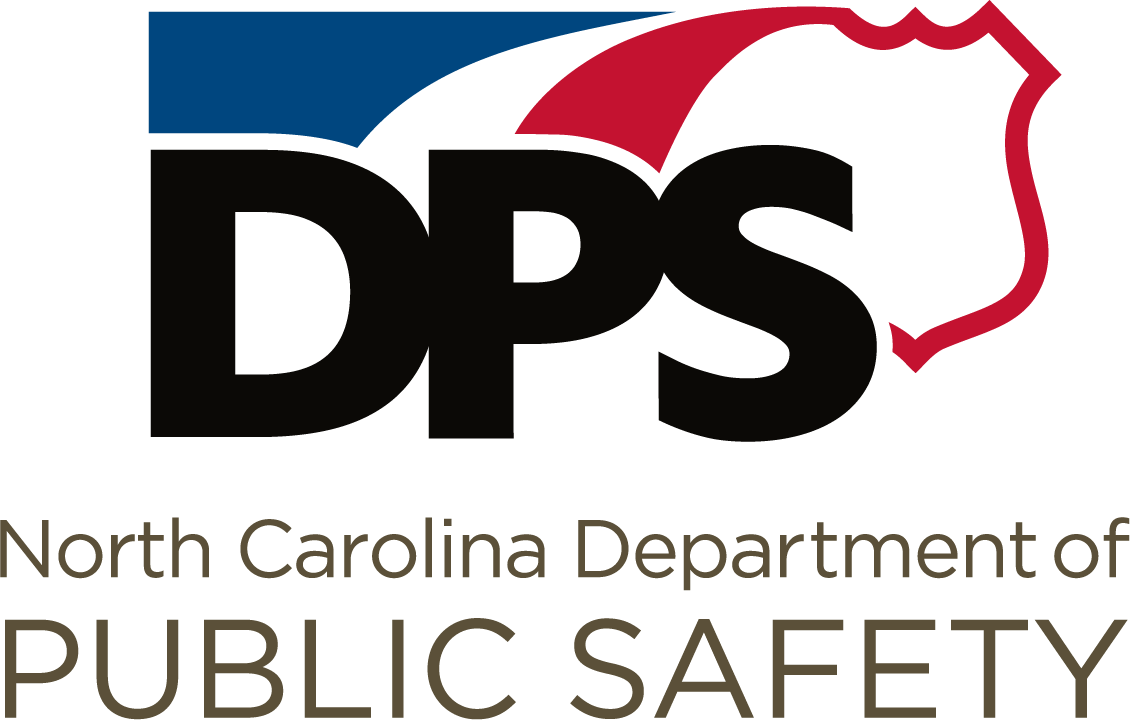
- Logo of the North Carolina Department of Public Safety

Agency overview
- Formed: 1977 (as the Department of Crime Control and Public Safety)
- Jurisdiction: State of North Carolina
- Headquarters: 512 North Salisbury Street Raleigh, North Carolina
- Agency executive: Eddie Buffaloe, Secretary
- Child agencies: North Carolina State Highway Patrol; North Carolina State Bureau of Investigation
- Website: ncdps.gov

The North Carolina Department of Public Safety (NCDPS) is an umbrella agency that carries out many of the state's law enforcement, emergency response and homeland security functions. The department was created in 1977 as the Department of Crime Control and Public Safety. In 2012, the North Carolina Department of Correction and the North Carolina Department of Juvenile Justice and Delinquency Prevention were merged with Crime Control & Public Safety to create the new agency.

The department is headed by a secretary of public safety, who is appointed by the governor of North Carolina. The secretary is a member of the North Carolina Cabinet. The most recent Secretary Eddie Buffaloe was reaffirmed on January 5, 2025.

== Sections ==
The Department of Public Safety is headquartered in the Archdale Building along Halifax Mall in Raleigh. It is broken into sections that cover a wide range of regulatory and law enforcement tasks.

Section	Responsibility
ABC Commission	regulation of alcoholic beverage sales
Administration	office of the Secretary of Public Safety and general administrative services
Alarm Systems Licensing Board	regulation of alarm system companies
Alcohol Law Enforcement	enforcement of state laws for alcohol, tobacco, and other controlled substances, lottery and gambling laws, and the state Boxing Authority
Alcoholism and Chemical Dependency Programs	substance abuse treatment services for inmates within the North Carolina prison system
Communications Office	media relations
Emergency Management	coordinate preparedness and response to a wide range of emergency situations, from chemical and nuclear accidents, to weather-related emergencies; also oversees the North Carolina Wing of the Civil Air Patrol
Governor's Clemency Office	advises the Governor regarding pardons for convicted criminals
Governor's Crime Commission	advises the governor on a wide range of crime issues, as well as administers various federal grant-based programs
Juvenile Justice and Delinquency Prevention	reduction and prevention of juvenile delinquency by effectively intervening, educating and treating at-risk and justice-involved youth to strengthen families and enhance public safety
Law Enforcement Services Section	procurement for the states law enforcement agencies
North Carolina National Guard	State militia
Private Protective Services Board	regulation of private security companies
North Carolina State Capitol Police	state security police charged with protection of state property and personnel
North Carolina State Highway Patrol	highway safety and enforcement of state traffic laws
Victims Compensation Services	provides financial reimbursement for medical expenses and other support services for crime victims

=== Juvenile facilities ===
The juvenile section has the following juvenile long-term commitment facilities, called "youth development centers":

- Cabarrus Youth Development Center near Concord - Opened in 1909 as Stonewall Jackson Youth Development Center- Renamed in 2020
- Edgecombe Youth Development Center near Rocky Mount
- Chatham Youth Development Center in the Central Carolina Business Park in Siler City - Houses girls and boys - Opened in 2008
- Lenoir Youth Development Center - Near Kinston - Serves boys, opened in 1944
- Rockingham Youth Development Center near Reidsville - Opened in 2024

== Secretaries ==
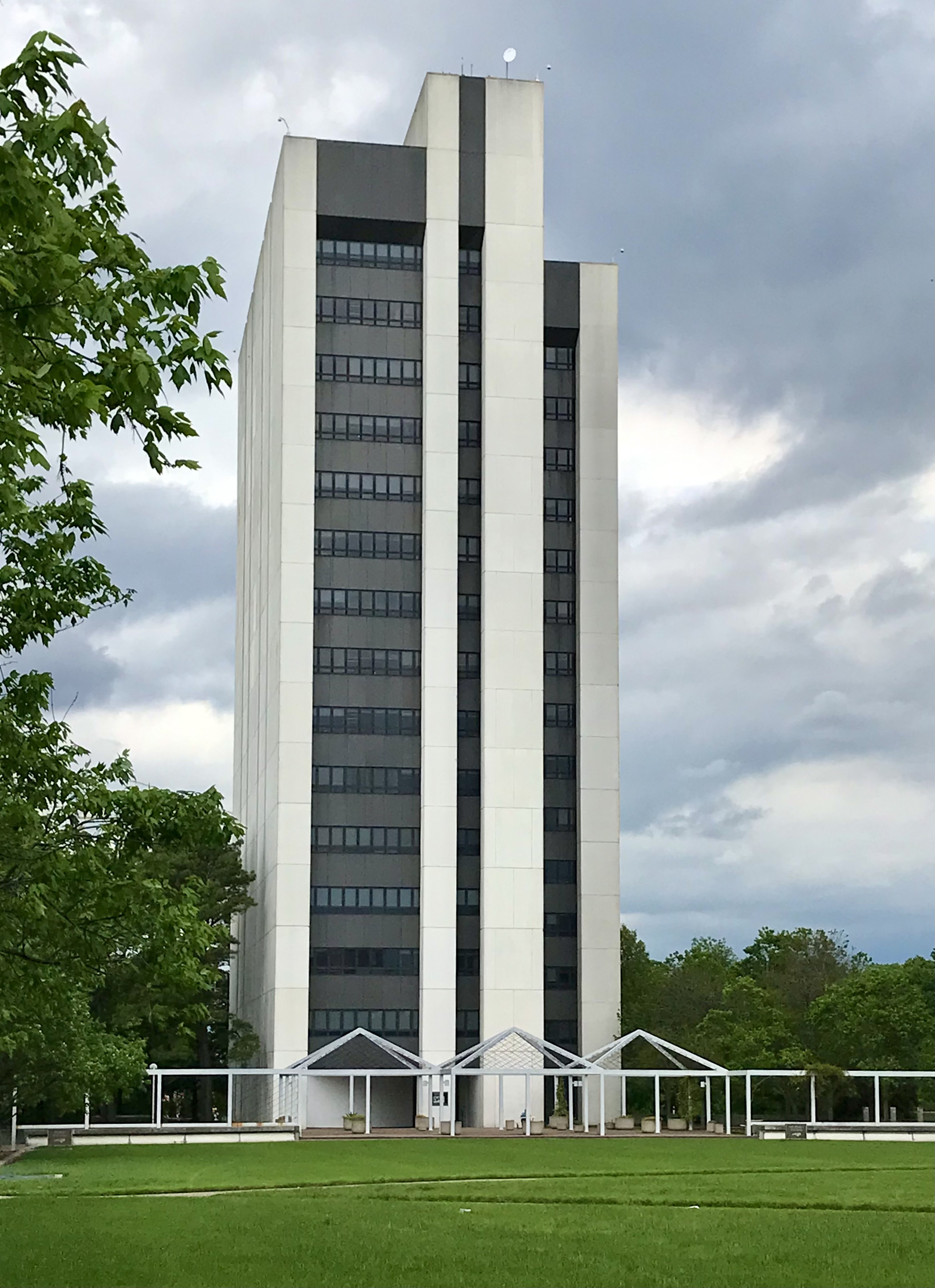
Archdale Building in Raleigh, where NCDPS is headquartered

- J. Phil Carlton, April 1977 to December 1978
- Herbert L. Hyde, Jan. 1979 to August 1979
- Burley B. Mitchell, August 1979 to January 1982
- Heman R. Clark, Feb. 1982 to January 1985
- Joseph W. Dean, January 1985 to May 1992
- Alan V. Pugh, June 1992 to January 1993
- Thurman B. Hampton, February 1993 to September 1995
- Richard H. Moore, December 1995 to November 1999
- David E. Kelly, November 1999 to January 2001
- Bryan E. Beatty, January 2001 to January 2009
- Reuben F. Young, January 2009 - January 2013 (Secretary of Crime Control & Public Safety until 1 Jan. 2012; Secretary of Public Safety thereafter)
- Kieran Shanahan, January 2013 - July 2013
- Frank L. Perry, August 2013 – December 2016
- Erik Hooks, January 2017 – August 2021
- Eddie Buffaloe, September 2021 – present

== Controversy ==
Over the recommendations of the prison staff, a private maintenance contract with the Keith Corporation and the manner in which the contract was renewed resulted in an FBI investigation as reported by the News & Observer.

At the prison located in Tabor City, NC, as reported by WECT in February 2014, the new administrator was accused of forcing employees to pay the new administrator for promotions through an administrator-designed "fundraising" campaign. According to WECT, "still, an October e-mail sent by Prison Administrator Patsy Chavis to staff reads, "We cannot require anyone to pay...however supervisors need to be encouraged to participate... Please let me know if you encounter any resistance or unwillingness to pay.". After an internal investigation lasting only a few weeks, the state found no "wrongdoing" in the fundraising effort but halted the program until "state prison administrators and auditors can develop formal policy guidelines for employee fundraising activities.".

Another issue at the same prison, in February 2014, was the death of a 39-year-old inmate, in which an autopsy was needed to determine the cause of death. The cause of death was originally reported as having been natural causes; however, a WECT report from July 2015 revealed an autopsy performed by the North Carolina Chief Medical Examiner's Office concluded his death was caused by methanol toxicity, possibly due to "drinking a mixture of hand sanitizer and other unidentified fluids." According to the same report, the Department of Public Safety conducted an internal investigation, but did not publicly release their findings.

In June 2017, the Charlotte Observer launched a series of articles that found a hidden world of drugs, sex, and gang violence – much of it fueled by employees within the prison system. As a result of these articles, the North Carolina General Assembly has directed state prison leaders to turn over information about contraband, hiring practices, and employee misconduct. Another article covered how tax dollars were used to fund drugs, cell phones, and abuse in the prison system. An additional story found that the "staff shortages in North Carolina's prisons have climbed to dangerous levels over the past two years."

The News & Observer of Raleigh reported that the 5 deaths of officers in 2017 may have been prevented by better staffing.

After its review, the Joint Legislative Oversight Committee on Justice and Public Safety could make recommendations to the full legislature before it convenes for the 2018 session in May 2018.

WBTV reported that a prison employee stated that prison administrators have taken steps to manipulate the numbers in an attempt to cover the deep extent of the staffing shortage. Another report by the same station stated that safety audit teams routinely overlook safety problems to benefit their friends. "You and I both know that when I go to your facility or when you go to my facility to look at security issues, we sort of take a cursory glance because we don't want to hurt our buddies' feelings at another facility,
