= John Robinson =

John Robinson may refer to:

== Academics ==
- John Thomas Romney Robinson (1792–1882), Irish astronomer and physicist
- John Robinson (botanist) (1846–1925), American botanist
- John J. Robinson (1918–1996), historian and author of Born in Blood
- John Talbot Robinson (1923–2001), paleontologist
- John Alan Robinson (1930–2016), British and American philosopher, mathematician, and early computer scientist
- John D. Robinson (psychologist) (1946–2021), psychologist and professor of psychiatry and surgery at Howard University
- John Martin Robinson (born 1948), English Officer of Arms and historian
- John C. Robinson (biologist) (born 1959), American ornithologist and environmental activist
- John R. Robinson, American accountant, professor at the University of Texas at Austin

== Arts and entertainment ==
=== Music ===
- John Robinson (organist) (1682–1762), English organist
- John Robinson (drummer) (born 1954), American drummer and session musician
- Jon-John Robinson (born 1970), American record producer and songwriter
- John Robinson (church musician) (born 1983), English organist and choir director

=== Theatre ===
- John Robinson (English actor) (1908–1979), British actor, known for Quatermass II
- John Mark Robinson (born 1948), Canadian-born American designer, director, and actor
- John Robinson (American actor) (born 1985)

=== Visual arts ===
- John Robinson (painter) (1715–1745), English painter
- John Henry Robinson (1796–1871), English line engraver
- John Charles Robinson (1824–1913), English painter, art collector, and curator
- John N. Robinson (1921–1994), African-American artist
- John Robinson (sculptor) (1935–2007), British sculptor
- John Z. Robinson (born 1953), New Zealand artist
- John V. Robinson (born 1960), American photographer, writer, and folklorist

=== Others artists ===
- John Robinson (circus owner) (1843–1921), American owner of the John Robinson Circus

== Military ==
- John Robinson (militiaman) (1735–1805), American Revolutionary War militia officer
- John C. Robinson (1817–1897), Union general in the American Civil War
- John Robinson (Medal of Honor) (1840–?), U.S. Navy sailor and Medal of Honor recipient
- John H. Robinson (Medal of Honor) (1846–1883), Irish Civil War soldier, and Medal of Honor recipient
- John Robinson (aviator) (1905–1954), American aviator and activist

== Politics and law ==
=== Canada ===
- John Robinson (businessman) (1782–1828), merchant and political figure in New Brunswick
- Sir John Robinson, 1st Baronet, of Toronto (1791–1863), lawyer, judge and political figure in Upper Canada, kinsman of John Robinson (1650–1723)
  - His son John Beverley Robinson (1821–1896), Canadian, mayor of Toronto 1856 and Lieutenant Governor of Ontario 1880–1887
- John James Robinson (1811–1874), naval officer and political figure in England and New Brunswick
- John A. Robinson (1867–1929), Scottish-born educator, journalist and political figure in Newfoundland
- John Lyle Robinson (1890–1953), member of the Legislative Assembly of Alberta

=== New Zealand ===
- John Robinson (New Zealand politician) (1810/1811?–1865), Superintendent of Nelson Province

=== United Kingdom ===
- Sir John Robinson, 1st Baronet, of London (1615–1680), Lord Mayor of London, MP for the City of London, Middlesex and Rye
- John Robinson (Liskeard MP) (1620–?), English politician in House of Commons in 1660
- John Robinson (Harwich MP) (1727–1802), British Member of Parliament for Harwich, 1774–1803
- John Roland Robinson, 1st Baron Martonmere (1907–1989), British Conservative politician, Governor of Bermuda, 1964–1972

=== United States ===
- John Robinson (New York politician) (1654–1734), Member of the New York General Assembly of 1691
- John Robinson (burgess) (died 1749), Virginia planter and politician, father of Speaker John Robinson
- John Robinson (Virginia politician, born 1705) (1705–1766), Speaker of the House of Burgesses in Virginia
- John M. Robinson (Illinois politician) (1794–1843), U.S. Senator from Illinois
- John S. Robinson (governor) (1804–1860), 22nd Governor of Vermont
- John L. Robinson (1813–1860), U.S. Representative from Indiana
- John Robinson (Virginia politician, born 1822) (1822–1908), African American state senator in Virginia
- John H. Robinson (Virginia politician, born 1857) (1857-1932), African American member of the Virginia House of Delegates
- John Mitchell Robinson (1827–1896), chief judge of the Maryland Court of Appeals
- John Buchanan Robinson (1846–1933), U.S. Representative from Pennsylvania
- John Seaton Robinson (1856–1903), Nebraska representative
- John Robinson (judge) (1880–1951), Chief Justice of the Washington Supreme Court
- John H. Robinson (politician) (born 1955), Wisconsin representative
- John J. Robinson (politician) (1888–1934), member of the New York State Assembly
- John Robinson (Maine politician) (born 1972), served in the Maine House of Representatives
- John Robinson (agriculture commissioner) (1831–1899), North Carolina politician
- John Robinson (US Marshal) (1838–1917), sheriff of Bennington County, Vermont and US Marshal for the District of Vermont
- John Trumbull Robinson (1871–1937), American attorney

== Religion ==
- John Robinson (pastor) (1576–1625), English pastor who organized the Mayflower voyage
- John Robinson (bishop of London) (1650–1723), English diplomat, Bishop of Bristol, Lord Privy Seal etc.
- John Robinson (historian) (1774–1840), English cleric
- John Edward Robinson (bishop) (1849–1922), Methodist Episcopal missionary bishop who served in India and Burma
- John Robinson (priest) (1852–1916), Dean of Belfast
- John Robinson (bishop of Woolwich) (John Arthur Thomas Robinson, 1919–1983), British Bishop of Woolwich
- John Robinson (Archdeacon of Bedford) (died 1598), English priest and academic
- Ken Robinson (priest) (John Kenneth Robinson, 1936–2020), Anglican priest and Dean of Gibraltar
- Sir John Freind Robinson, 1st Baronet (1754–1832), Archdeacon of Armagh

== Sports ==
=== American football ===
- Jack Robinson (American football) (1913–1971), player
- John Robinson (American football) (1935–2024), coach

=== Association football ===
- Jack Robinson (footballer, born 1870) (John William Robinson, 1870–1931), England, Derby County and Southampton football goalkeeper
- Jack Robinson (footballer, born 1887) (John Robinson, 1887–?), English footballer
- Jack Robinson (footballer, born 1918) (John James Robinson, 1918-1993), English footballer; see List of Bury F.C. players (1–24 appearances)
- John Robinson (footballer, born 1971) (born 1971), Welsh footballer

=== Baseball ===
- Jack Robinson (catcher) (John W. Robinson, 1880–1921), American baseball player
- Jack Robinson (pitcher) (John Edward Robinson, 1921–2000), American baseball player

=== Cricket ===
- John Robinson (cricketer, born 1868) (1868–1898), English cricketer
- John Robinson (sportsman) (1872–1959), English cricketer and rugby union footballer
- John Robinson (cricketer, born 1909) (1909–1988), English cricketer

=== Other sports ===
- John Yate Robinson (1885–1916), British field hockey player
- John Robinson (Australian rules footballer) (1891–1966)

== Others ==
- John Robinson (merchant), British merchant in the 19th century; see Juan Manuel Canaveris
- John Robinson (engineer) (1823–1902), British locomotive engineer
- John Richard Robinson (1828–1903), English journalist
- John Robinson (Natal politician) (1839–1903), prime minister of Colony of Natal
- John Beverley Robinson (anarchist) (1853–1923), American anarchist author
- John Moore Robinson (1855–1934), Canadian explorer
- John G. Robinson (1856–1943), railway engineer
- John Robinson (brewer) (1895–1978), British brewing executive and local politician
- John Edward Robinson (born 1943), American serial killer
- John D. Robinson (disability advocate) (born 1968), American author, entrepreneur, and activist
- John Robinson (architect, born 1829), designer of St Lawrence and Mary Magdalene Drinking Fountain, London
- John Robinson (estate agent) (died 1927), perpetrator of the Charing Cross Trunk Murder

== See also ==
- Jack Robinson (disambiguation)
- Jackie Robinson (disambiguation)
- John Robison (disambiguation)
- Johnny Robinson (disambiguation)
- Jon Robinson (disambiguation)
- Jonathan Robinson (disambiguation)
