= Lighthouse Mouse =

- Directed by: Robert McKimson
- Story by: Sid Marcus
- Starring: Mel Blanc
- Music by: Milt Franklyn
- Animation by: Phil DeLara; Charles McKimson; Herman Cohen; Rod Scribner
- Layouts by: Robert Givens
- Backgrounds by: Richard H. Thomas
- Color process: Technicolor
- Production company: Warner Bros. Cartoons
- Distributed by: Warner Bros. Pictures; The Vitaphone Corporation
- Release date: March 12, 1955 (USA)
- Running time: 7 minutes
- Language: English

Lighthouse Mouse is a 1955 Warner Bros. Merrie Melodies animated cartoon, written by Sid Marcus and directed by Robert McKimson, with voice characterizations provided by Mel Blanc. The short was released on March 12, 1955, and stars Sylvester and Hippety Hopper.

== Plot ==
It is 11 o'clock at night at a lighthouse on a small island, and the clock's pendulum is intermittently deflecting the light from the beacon into a mouse-hole downstairs, keeping the resident mouse wide awake. The baggy-eyed rodent crawls out of bed, climbs the steps to the beacon, and yanks the plug out of the outlet to turn it off. Polly the parrot immediately flies into the light-keeper's bedroom squawking "Light's out! Light's out!" The lightkeeper wakes up shouting, "Grrrreat Scott! It's that crrrrazy moose (mouse) again!" Consequently, a cargo carrier named Australia crashes into the rocks on the shore of the island, causing several wooden crates to spill overboard. The frustrated captain admonishes the light-keeper to keep the beacon lit, and the light-keeper and Polly apologize for the mishap. Hippety Hopper, a baby kangaroo intended for delivery to a city zoo, is inside one of the fallen crates, and after the ship departs, he hops off within the crate until it breaks apart against the rocks, setting him free.

While all this is going on, Sylvester is downstairs sleeping. The light-keeper abruptly wakes him up, rebuking, "While you sleep, that crrrrazy moose is loose in the hoose (house)!" (which Polly repeats), then orders him to go upstairs to catch him and to "Hurrrry up, now, hurrrry up, now" (which Polly also echoes). Sylvester tells Polly he can catch the mouse in a matter of seconds, and Polly starts counting the seconds.

Hippety then hops into the lighthouse and follows Sylvester up the stairs. Sylvester sets a mousetrap and attaches a string to said trap. When he hears a snap, he pulls on the string and sees he has caught Hippety, whom he thinks is a giant mouse, which makes his jaw drop to the floor and then fall into pieces. Sylvester then shoots like a bullet down the stairs as Polly keeps counting ("542...543..."), and dashes to the bathroom, thinking he must have "lighthouse eyes" or "stigmatism". He puts in eye drops, then, grabbing a bottle of vitamins, gulps them down and showers himself with them.

Meanwhile, the mouse frees Hippety from the trap, and Hippety returns the favor by pulling the plug out of the wall. ("Lights out! Lights out!") Sylvester runs out of the bathroom, tells Polly to "Keep counting, buster" ("3,685...3,686...3,687"), runs upstairs, puts the plug back in and pounds a few nails over it to prevent Hippety and the mouse from pulling it out again. He then prepares to knock Hippety out with a club and swings at him when he sees what appears to be Hippety's shadow approaching, but misses and sees that it is only the mouse wielding a mallet, which he uses to slam Sylvester's foot. The mouse then zips behind the elevator door. Sylvester pounds on the door, and Hippety kicks him into the wall. Sylvester then sees Hippety and the mouse behind the door playing a back-and-forth switcheroo, making him think he must be hallucinating. Sylvester then charges back toward the elevator and Sylvester, the mouse, and Hippety get into a scuffle, which ends with Hippety sending Sylvester tumbling down the stairs. By this time, Polly has counted more than 70,000 seconds (which in reality is most of a day (19.444... hours)), but the punch-drunk feline goes back for more, assuring Polly he will get the mouse "quicker than you can count up to Jack Robinson".

The mouse cuts the extension cord in two places with a pair of scissors, putting the lights out again, and the furious light-keeper stalks Sylvester with a Shillelagh (a traditional Irish club/walking-stick) threatening to "fix that good-fer-nothin' pussycat.". Seeing this from higher up the stairs puts Sylvester in a panic and runs up the stairs and attempts to reconnect the cord by stretching it but to no avail; as the light-house keeper approaches the room, Sylvester improvises a temporary solution by using himself as a conductor between the cut parts of the cord and gets a massive electric jolt, which turns the lights back on ("Lights on! Lights on! Lights on!") and spares him a beating...for the moment.

As Sylvester tapes the cord back together ("I'm a pussycat, not an electrician!"), the mouse rigs a dynamite stick with the cord wrapped around it. When Sylvester hears the hiss of the fuse and discovers it, he recoils in horror, knowing he's doomed when it blows. It explodes, completely destroying the cord beyond any chance of repair, while Sylvester, burnt and singed, is still waving his hand and head in terror as he knows he's done for. Immediately, the light-keeper runs back up the stairs and pummels Sylvester with not his Shillelagh but a big club.

In the final scene, the light-keeper, Polly, Hippety, and the mouse are sleeping happily while Sylvester is serving as the beacon, hooked up to a battery with the light projecting through his eyes. To this, he laments, "I never thought just being a pussycat could be so complicated!".
