= Jack Robinson =

Jack Robinson may refer to:

== Sports people ==
- Jack Robinson (catcher) (1880–1921), American baseball player
- Jack Robinson (footballer, born 1870) (1870–1931), England, Derby County and Southampton football goalkeeper
- Jack Robinson (footballer, born 1887) (1887–?), English footballer
- Jack Robinson (footballer, born 1918), English footballer, see List of Bury F.C. players (1–24 appearances)
- Jack Robinson (footballer, born 1993), English footballer
- Jack Robinson (footballer, born 2001), English footballer
- Jack Robinson (pitcher) (1921–2000), American baseball player
- Jack Robinson (rugby league), rugby league footballer of the 1910s for Great Britain, and Rochdale Hornets
- Jack 'Junker' Robinson (1892–1981), Australian rugby league footballer
- Jack Robinson (horse racing), British horse racer of 1905
- Jack Robinson (tackle) (1911–2001), American football player
- Jack Robinson (center) (1913–1971), American football player
- Jack Robinson (surfer) (born 1997), Australian surfer

== Other people ==
- Jack C. Robinson (1922–1942), United States Marine Corps Silver Star recipient
- Jack Robinson (photographer) (1928–1997), American photographer
- Jack Robinson (songwriter) (born 1938), American songwriter and music publisher
- Jack Robinson (anarchist) (1913–1983), anarchist activist and editor of the Freedom paper

== Characters ==
- Jack Robinson (idiom), colloquialism

== Ships ==
- USS Jack C. Robinson (APD-72), a United States Navy high-speed transport in commission from 1945 to 1946

== See also ==
- Jackie Robinson (disambiguation)
- John Robinson (disambiguation)
- Robinson (name)
