= Johnny Robinson =

Johnny Robinson may refer to:

- Johnny Robinson (defensive tackle) (born 1959), former defensive tackle for the Oakland Raiders
- Johnny Robinson (footballer) (1936–2019), English footballer
- Johnny Leartice Robinson (1952–2004), convicted murderer
- Johnny Robinson (safety) (born 1938), former safety for the Kansas City Chiefs
- Johnny Robinson (singer), British singer and contestant on The X Factor in 2011
- The shooting of Johnny Robinson, a sixteen-year-old black youth that was shot to death in 1963

== See also ==
- John Robinson (disambiguation)
