= Wickline =

Wickline is a surname. Notable people with the surname include:

- Dan Wickline (born 1970), American writer and photographer
- Jane Wickline (born 1999), American comedian and actress
- Matt Wickline (born 1962), American television writer, producer, director, and actor
- William Wickline (1952–2004), American serial killer
