= William G. Zuern Jr. =

American murderer (1958–2004)

- Mug shot of Zuern
- Born: December 5, 1958; Cincinnati, Ohio, U.S.
- Died: June 8, 2004 (aged 45); Southern Ohio Correctional Facility, Ohio, U.S.
- Status: Executed by lethal injection
- Convictions: Aggravated murder (2 counts); Abduction; Aggravated assault Burglary; Attempted robbery Petit theft Malicious destruction of property (4 counts)
- Penalty: Death (October 5, 1984)

Details
- Victims: Gregory Earls, 24; Phillip Pence, 26
- Span of crimes: May 12 – June 9, 1984

William Gerald Zuern Jr. (December 5, 1958 – June 8, 2004) was an American convicted murderer who was executed by the state of Ohio for the murder of a Hamilton County sheriff's deputy working as a corrections officer in the county jail. Zuern spent 19 years and 7 months on death row, with lawyers fighting his death sentence. His execution occurred on the day before the 20th anniversary of the crime for which he was condemned.

== Murders ==
=== Gregory Earls ===
On May 12, 1984, Zuern shot and killed 24-year-old Gregory Earls with a single shot to the chest from a pistol. The murder was a revenge killing. In 1979, Earls, who was a police informant, had helped convict Zuern's father of drug trafficking. Zuern's father served five years probation for the offense, albeit he later claimed he was framed. A day after the killing, Zuern was arrested at an apartment and offered no resistance. He was then placed in the Community Correctional Institution in Hamilton County.

=== Phillip Pence ===
While awaiting trial for the murder of Earls, Zuern had a conversation with another inmate about corrections officers' failures to give him his full five minutes of telephone time. During the conversation, Zuern expressed general hostility toward the officers, saying "somebody should do something to them sons of bitches." The inmate also had observed Zuern sharpening a straightened portion of a hook from a metal bucket over the course of three days and informed a corrections officer that Zuern either had a knife or a shank.

On June 9, 1984, another inmate informed a sheriff's deputy that he and Zuern had argued the day before and that Zuern said he was going to kill him. The inmate also said that Zuern had a homemade knife which he had sharpened on his cell floor. That evening, officers proceeded to search Zuern's cell, among others. Before the officers arrived at Zuern's cell, Zuern received word from another inmate that the officers were coming to search his cell.

At approximately 10:20 p.m., Officers Joe Burton and Phillip Pence arrived to perform the search and found Zuern lying naked in his bunk. Officer Pence ordered Zuern to get to his feet; he then stood at the door of the cell. Pence unlocked the cell and told Zuern to come out and put his hands against the wall. Zuern lunged at Pence and fatally stabbed him in the chest with the metal shank. The weapon was a long dagger-like piece of metal, approximately seven inches long. One end was sharpened to a point, and the other end was curved into a loop.

== Trials ==
In September 1984, Zuern was tried for the murder of Phillip Pence. Jury selection began on September 17. Zuern entered a plea of not guilty and not guilty by reason of insanity. Throughout his trial, Zuern refused to take the stand and testify on his own behalf. His defense attorneys called no witnesses and made no opening statements. Two inmates who had been imprisoned with Zuern testified against him.

On October 1, 1984, Zuern was found guilty of aggravated murder in the death of Pence. At the sentencing phase, he refused to present any mitigation. Zuern told the jury that while he did not want to be executed, he was not going to beg for mercy. On October 3, the jury recommended that he be sentenced to death. On October 5, Judge William Morrissey sentenced Zuern to death.

In November 1984, Zuern pleaded guilty to aggravated murder in the shooting of Gregory Earls. On November 19, Zuern was sentenced to a life term, which was to run concurrently with his death sentence in Pence's murder.

== Time on death row ==
=== Hostage taking incident ===
On October 14, 1985, Zuern and several other inmates, including death row inmates Jay D. Scott and John William Byrd Jr., took two guards hostage at the Southern Ohio Correctional Facility. The prisoners demanded that they receive free deodorant, access to televisions and radios, more desserts, and transfers to the Franklin County Jail. They threatened to harm the guards if the demands were not met. After fifteen hours of negotiations, the guards were released unharmed.

In June 1986, Zuern and his accomplices were tried for kidnapping charges in relation to the hostage-taking, however, a jury was unable to reach a verdict. Afterward, the prosecutor struck a deal with the inmates and said if they agreed to plead guilty to the lesser charge of abduction that they would be treated to a gourmet dinner. The inmates agreed, were treated to the meal, and were only charged with abduction, with each being sentenced to two to ten years in prison, which would run concurrently with their other sentences. The meal sparked outrage. The mother of Phillip Pence called it terrible, and said, "There is no justice in this world. None."

=== Appeals ===
On June 11, 1986, Zuern's convictions and sentences were upheld by the Court of Appeals.

On March 31, 2000, a federal judge overturned Zuern's conviction, due to claims that potentially favorable evidence had not been turned over to Zuern's attorney.

In July 2003, the Cincinnati-based 6th Circuit reinstated his death sentence.

== Execution ==
On June 8, 2004, Zuern was executed via lethal injection at the Southern Ohio Correctional Facility. He offered no last words and refused to see his sisters. His last meal consisted of mashed potatoes with gravy, lasagna, macaroni and cheese, garlic bread, cherry cheesecake, chocolate milk, hot sauce, and salt.

== See also ==
- Capital punishment in Ohio
- Capital punishment in the United States
- List of people executed in Ohio
- List of people executed in the United States in 2004

Executions carried out in Ohio
Preceded by William Wickline March 30, 2004	William G. Zuern Jr. June 8, 2004	Succeeded by Stephen Vrabel July 14, 2004
Executions carried out in the United States
Preceded by James Neil Tucker – South Carolina May 28, 2004	William G. Zuern Jr. – Ohio; June 8, 2004	Succeeded by Robert Bryan – Oklahoma June 8, 2004
