= Jay D. Scott =

American murderer (1952–2001)

- Mug shot of Scott
- Born: August 21, 1952; Cleveland, Ohio, U.S.
- Died: June 14, 2001 (aged 48); Southern Ohio Correctional Facility, Lucasville, Ohio, U.S.
- Cause of death: Execution by lethal injection
- Convictions: Aggravated murder (2 counts); Aggravated robbery (2 counts); Armed robbery Felonious assault Abduction; Attempted escape
- Penalty: Death (April 16, 1984)

Jay D. Scott (August 21, 1952 – June 14, 2001) was an American convicted murderer who was executed by the state of Ohio for the 1983 murder of a delicatessen owner in Cleveland. He was the second man put to death by Ohio since it reinstated capital punishment in 1981 and the first to be executed involuntarily. Scott's execution generated attention as he was diagnosed with schizophrenia, with his lawyers arguing he was too mentally ill to be executed.

== Early life ==
Jay D. Scott was born on August 21, 1952, in Cleveland, Ohio, the sixth of eleven children born to Willie and Sadie Scott. Both his parents were alcoholics who spent most of their income on alcohol and gambling. Scott grew up in an impoverished neighborhood on Cleveland's East Side and slept in a bedroom with up to four of his siblings sharing the same bed as him. Scott spent most of his days on the street, and by the age of nine, had been arrested on charges of truancy, theft, and breaking and entering. He was later placed in the Cleveland Boys School for troubled youth at the age of 13. Two of Scott's siblings were murdered and another was paralyzed in a shooting.

== Murders ==
On May 6, 1983, Vinnie M. Price, owner and operator of the V & E Delicatessen in Cleveland, was shot and killed during an attempted armed robbery of her establishment. An autopsy later revealed that she died from a gunshot wound to the chest. A nearby resident testified that while walking back to her home after shopping at a local market, she noticed a greenish-blue Cadillac without a rear license plate pull up across from her house. She observed two men inside the car; one behind the wheel and the other in the back seat. She later observed another man come over a nearby fence and dive through the open window of the Cadillac. The car then drove away.

The day after Price's murder, Scott participated in the robbery-slaying of Alexander Jones, a security guard at a restaurant. He was later sentenced to death in that case, but the sentence was reduced to life on appeal.

== Capture ==
Sometime after the robbery, police received a telephone call from Ricky Tramble and a meeting between them was arranged. As a result, they began looking for the Cadillac used in the crime, and several suspects. Tramble testified at trial that he informed the detective that on the day Vinnie Price was killed, he was with Edward O'Neal, Michael Streeter, Danny Jones, and Jay D. Scott at O'Neal's girlfriend's house. Tramble stated that he had overheard Scott say, "Well, I did what I had to do. She shouldn't have made me move like that. Fuck it. It's over with." Scott professed to be "a stick-up man." Tramble related that O'Neal had informed him the next day of their involvement in the V & E Delicatessen incident, including the shooting of Price.

Jones and O'Neal were arrested and gave statements to police that Scott shot Price. On May 17, 1983, the grand jury charged Scott with aggravated murder with an aggravated robbery specification and a firearm specification, and aggravated robbery. Also charged in the same indictments were co-defendants Danny Jones, Edward O'Neal, and Michael Streeter.

On July 29, 1983, Scott was arrested in Reading, Pennsylvania. On November 10, 1983, Scott was returned to Ohio for trial. During the trip back to Cleveland, he inquired who was using his name in connection with a homicide and robbery. Up to this point, the arresting officers had informed Scott that he was wanted in connection with a homicide but made no mention of the fact that he was also charged with aggravated robbery. Scott maintained that he had been in Reading when the incident occurred.

== Trial and appeals ==
Scott entered a plea of not guilty. On March 23, 1984, after a trial by jury, he was found guilty as to all counts and specifications. On March 28, 1984, the jury recommended the sentence of death. On April 3, 1984, Judge Joseph McManamon accepted the jury's recommendation and ordered that Scott be put to death. His co-conspirators in the robbery and killing all received life prison terms.

Scott's attorneys took his case through the appellate system four times, going all the way to the U.S. Supreme Court, unsuccessfully arguing that Scott should not be executed because he suffered from chronic schizophrenia. They said the execution would violate the Eighth Amendment prohibition against cruel and unusual punishment.

== Hostage taking incident ==
On October 14, 1985, Scott and several other inmates, including death row inmates William G. Zuern Jr. and John William Byrd Jr., took two guards hostage at the Southern Ohio Correctional Facility. The prisoners demanded that they receive free deodorant, access to televisions and radios, more desserts, and transfers to the Franklin County Jail. They threatened to harm the guards if the demands were not met. After fifteen hours of negotiations, the guards were released unharmed.

In June 1986, Scott and his accomplices were tried for kidnapping charges in relation to the hostage-taking, however, a jury was unable to reach a verdict. Afterward, the prosecutor struck a deal with the inmates and said if they agreed to plead guilty to the lesser charge of abduction that they would be treated to a gourmet dinner. The inmates agreed, were treated to the meal, and were only charged with abduction, with each being sentenced to two to ten years in prison, which would run concurrently with their other sentences. The meal sparked outrage.

== Execution ==
On April 19, 2000, Scott's execution was approved. He twice came within moments of being executed before he was finally put to death by lethal injection on June 14, 2001. On April 17, 2001, Scott's execution was stopped 65 minutes before it was expected to happen. On May 15, 2001, the 6th U.S. Circuit Court of Appeals stepped in and the execution was halted at 8:57 p.m. Scott already had the injection shunts in his arms.

== See also ==
- Capital punishment in Ohio
- Capital punishment in the United States
- List of people executed in Ohio
- List of people executed in the United States in 2001

Executions carried out in Ohio
Preceded by Wilford Berry Jr. February 19, 1999	Jay D. Scott; June 14, 2001	Succeeded by John William Byrd Jr. February 19, 2002
Executions carried out in the United States
Preceded by John Wheat – Texas June 13, 2001	Jay D. Scott – Ohio; June 14, 2001	Succeeded by Juan Garza – Federal government June 19, 2001
