= Kelsey Patterson =

American murderer (1954–2004)

Kelsey Patterson (March 24, 1954 – May 18, 2004) was executed by the State of Texas. He was convicted of the murder of 63-year-old Louis Oates, the owner of an oil company, and 41-year-old Dorothy Harris, who was Oates's secretary. Patterson had a history of mental illness, and before his execution, the Texas Board of Pardons and Paroles recommended that his sentence be commuted to life in prison. However, Governor Rick Perry refused to commute the sentence because at that time Texas did not offer the possibility of life imprisonment without parole; even for capital crimes, life sentences came with eligibility for parole after 40 years.

== Background ==
Patterson was born in 1954 in Anderson County, Texas. He was diagnosed with paranoid schizophrenia in 1981. On August 25, 1992, at his home in Palestine, Texas, Patterson told his roommate that he might not ever see him again. He walked out to his front yard with a .38 caliber pistol and fired three times into an aluminum pan. He walked about a block to the Oates Oil Co., where the owner, Louis Oates, was standing on the loading dock. Patterson walked up behind Oates and shot him in the back of the head with a .38-caliber pistol. He left, but returned a short time later and shot Harris, who had come outside screaming upon hearing the shots and finding Oates. Patterson then went to a friend's house where he took off his clothing and was arrested standing naked in the street. No clear motive was established for the murders, but a friend of Oates told police that Patterson and the victim had once argued over whether Patterson was a better football player than Oates's son.

At trial, two men testified for the state that they had been shot by Patterson in separate incidents in 1980 and 1983. Both men said they were hit by multiple bullets; one suffered a punctured lung and the other was hospitalized for three months with wounds to the hip and groin. Defense attorneys said that Patterson suffered from delusions, and Patterson's half-sister said that his mental problems started soon after the death of Patterson's primary caretaker, his grandmother. Prosecutors said that Patterson was a mean person but not insane. The jury deliberated for two hours before finding Patterson guilty on July 1, 1993, and after four more hours of deliberation, returned the death sentence that same night.

== Recommendation for life sentence ==
In May 2004, Patterson received a rare recommendation from the Texas Board of Pardons and Paroles that his death sentence be commuted to life because of mental illness. Nonetheless, Governor Rick Perry refused to grant the commutation. Governor Perry explained why he refused to commute Patterson's sentence to life, "This defendant is a very violent individual. Texas has no life without parole sentencing option, and no one can guarantee this defendant would never be freed to commit other crimes were his sentence commuted. In the interests of justice and public safety, I am denying the defendant's request for clemency and a stay."

Prior to Patterson's execution, Texas had only two sentencing options for capital crimes: life with parole (with a minimum prison time of 40 years) or death by lethal injection; it did not have a life without parole option. Partially in response to the execution, in 2005, the Texas Legislature changed the capital murder sentencing law, which Governor Perry signed into law. Under the new law, the life with parole option was replaced with life without parole. However, for any unsolved cases prior to the change in law, in the event of a conviction the life with parole option still applies.

== Execution ==
Patterson was executed by lethal injection on May 18, 2004, aged 50. He made no last meal requests, but accepted an offer of a candy bar and a soft drink. While strapped down, he mumbled "No kin, no kin, no kin. I'm not guilty of a charge of capital murder. Give me my rights. I'm acquitted of capital murder." When the warden asked him if he had any last words, he replied "Statement to what? Statement to what? I'm not guilty of the charge of capital murder." Patterson continued to ramble on, asking repeatedly for his rights. At one point, he said, "Go to hell." As the drugs took effect, he was saying "Give me my life back."

He is buried at Captain Joe Byrd Cemetery.

== See also ==
- Capital punishment in Texas
- Capital punishment in the United States
- List of people executed in Texas, 2000–2009
- List of people executed in the United States in 2004
