= James Neil Tucker =

Executed American murderer (1957–2004)

- Tuker (left) during trial in 1994
- Born: January 12, 1957; Utah, U.S.
- Died: May 28, 2004 (aged 47); Broad River Correctional Institution, South Carolina, U.S.
- Status: Executed by electrocution
- Convictions: Murder (2 counts); Kidnapping; Armed robbery First degree burglary (2 counts); Third degree burglary Larceny; Possession of a weapon during a crime
- Penalty: Death

James Neil Tucker (January 12, 1957 – May 28, 2004) was an American convicted murderer who was executed in the electric chair by South Carolina for the murders of Rosa Lee "Dolly" Oakley and Shannon Lynn Mellon.

== Childhood and life before murders ==
Tucker was born in Utah, the youngest of three children. After his mother divorced, she remarried to a man with four children of his own. An eighth child came from this marriage. Tucker claimed during his trial and appeals that his stepfather had punished him severely, and as a youth, Tucker had committed petty crimes in an attempt to be taken out of the home by the authorities.

In 1974, Tucker was convicted of raping an eight-year-old girl and an 83-year-old woman when he was 13 in 1973. He received a sentence of one to 15 years from the Salt Lake County District Court. Four years later he was again before the courts, this time for escape and theft, receiving another one to 15 years sentence. He would spend most of his adult life in jail, escaping on three occasions in all. His longest period as a fugitive was five years in the 1980s.

While in prison, he became friends with a fellow inmate from South Carolina. The two went to Calhoun County, South Carolina, where in 1984 they worked at the Webb Carroll's Training Center, a horse farm east of St. Matthews. He went back into prison in Spartanburg County after being arrested for housebreaking and larceny. He was sentenced to 10 years.

After being released in 1988, he was sent back to Utah where he received another one to 15-year sentence for escaping prison. On being released in March 1992, Tucker returned to South Carolina. He married his pregnant girlfriend, Marcia, in Sumter. After he was sentenced to death, she divorced him.

== The murders ==
Rosa Lee "Dolly" Oakley, 54 years old, was gardening in the front yard of her Sumter home on June 25, 1992, when Tucker drove his car up her driveway. After talking to her and making sure she was alone, he pulled out a .25-caliber handgun and forced her inside into her bedroom. Joe Black and James Howard then arrived at the house, looking for Oakley's husband. Tucker allowed her to answer the door, where she told them that her husband wasn't home. They left, but as they backed down the driveway, she ran out of the house screaming "Don't leave me, he's going to kill me." Tucker dragged her back into the house and stole $14 from her purse. As she went for the telephone, Tucker fired the gun, hitting her in the head. According to Tucker, "I shot her again before I left just because, as stupid as it sounds, I thought she was suffering. So I put her out of her misery."

Tucker managed to evade police capture for the next week. During this time, he hid in delivery trucks, one time hiding in the undercarriage of a semi-trailer. He also continued his burglary, breaking into the Christian Fellowship Church and the mobile homes of Kenneth Parker and Myron Baker. He hitched rides to St. Matthews, where he stole a station wagon from a funeral home, but abandoned it after getting it stuck in a wooded area. His next destination was a cottage owned by the Webb Carroll's Training Center on July 1.

The cottage was home to Shannon Lynn Mellon, 21 years old, who was training to be a jockey. In the yard was a Chevrolet Blazer and a Ford Mustang. While Tucker was deciding what to do, a man emerged from the cottage and drove off in the Blazer. Tucker then entered the house and found Mellon asleep. He bound her with masking tape and decided to kill her and dump her body in the woods. He shot her once in the back of the head and stole $20. According to Tucker, she was not killed by the first shot and said "I can't see", so he shot her again. As he started to leave, she was still breathing, so she was shot once more, this time in the temple region. He drove to Spartanburg in her stolen Mustang.

Ten days after killing Mellon, he was arrested in Maggie Valley, North Carolina and the next day gave a 48-page confession to police.

== Trial and appeals ==
In separate trials in 1993 and 1994, Tucker was sentenced to death twice, once for the murder of Mellon and once for Oakley. The death sentence in the Mellon case was later overturned, because jurors had not been told that Tucker would be ineligible for parole under a life sentence; after a second sentencing phase the death sentence was reimposed.

Tucker was diagnosed by psychiatrists as having antisocial personality disorder, and was described as being very intelligent. He did not ask for clemency from the governor.

Tucker was executed in the electric chair on May 28, 2004. His final statement was read by his lawyer:

To everyone, I have thought of a million things to say, but they can all be summed up like this. To those I have harmed, my abject apologies and regrets. I am ashamed. To those who must remain and deal with this insane world, my condolences. But be of good cheer. Christ has overcome the world! I know that my redeemer lives. I am leaving this world with a cheerful attitude. Hallelujah.

== See also ==
- Capital punishment in South Carolina
- Capital punishment in the United States
- List of people executed in South Carolina
- List of people executed in the United States in 2004

== General references ==
- "A tough family life, poor choices and years in prison shaped James Neil Tucker into a killer". The Times and Democrat. May 2004.
- Clark County Prosecutor

Executions carried out in South Carolina
Preceded by Jason Byram April 23, 2004	James Neil Tucker; May 28, 2004	Succeeded by Richard Longworth April 15, 2005
Executions carried out in the United States
Preceded by John Blackwelder – Florida May 26, 2004	James Neil Tucker – South Carolina; May 28, 2004	Succeeded by William G. Zuern Jr. – Ohio June 8, 2004
