= Jonathan Robinson =

Jonathan Robinson may refer to:

- Jonathan Robinson (American politician) (1756–1819), American jurist and politician from the state of Vermont
- Jonathan Robinson (Canadian politician) (1894–1948), Canadian provincial politician
- Jonathan Robinson (English cricketer) (born 1966), former English cricketer
- Jonathan Robinson (Irish cricketer) (born 1982), Irish cricketer
- Jonathan Robinson (field hockey), South African field hockey player
- Jonathan Robinson (soccer) (born 2001), American soccer player

== See also ==
- Jon Robinson (disambiguation)
- John Robinson (disambiguation)
