= Jackie Robinson (disambiguation) =

Jackie Robinson (1919–1972) was the first African-American Major League Baseball player of the modern era.

Jackie Robinson may also refer to:

- Jackie Robinson (basketball, born 1927) (1927–2022), American basketball player in the 1948 Summer Olympics
- Jackie Robinson (basketball, born 1955), American professional basketball player and businessman
- Jackie Robinson (footballer) (1917–1972), British footballer who played for Sheffield Wednesday and Sunderland
- Jackie Robinson (singer), German female disco singer
- Jackie Robinson (musician), Jamaican singer and lead vocalist with The Pioneers
- Jackie Robinson (miniseries), a 2016 documentary film directed by Ken Burns

== See also ==
- Jack Robinson (disambiguation)
- John Robinson (disambiguation)
