= Catherine Ennis =

British organist and music director (1955–2020)

Catherine Ennis HonRCO
- Born: 20 January 1955
- Died: 24 December 2020 (aged 65)
- Occupations: organist, music director
- Instrument: Organ

Catherine Mary Ennis (January 20, 1955 – December 24, 2020) was an English organist and music director. She was president of the Royal College of Organists, the director of music at the church of St. Lawrence Jewry, and the founder of the London Organ Concerts Guide.

== Early life and education ==
Ennis was born on 20 January 1955, the daughter of the Irish musician and music collector Seamus Ennis and Margaret Glynn, who had married in 1952. She was born in England. She did not see her father for most of her childhood. She was brought up Roman Catholic. Ennis attended Christ's Hospital school in Hertfordshire and subsequently Kingsway Further Education College. She studied music at St. Hugh's College, Oxford, where she was organ scholar and exhibitioner. One of her organ teachers was Gillian Weir.

== Career ==
Ennis served as Assistant Organist at Christ Church Cathedral, Oxford. Concurrently, she became director of music at St. Marylebone Parish Church from 1980 until 1992. Later, she was the director of music at the church of St. Lawrence Jewry in the City of London, beginning in 1985 and serving for 35 years until her death.

She also established an international recital career, playing at the Proms, the Queen Elizabeth Hall and the Royal Festival Hall, as well as many other venues in the UK, Europe and the United States.

In 1994, Ennis established the London Organ Concerts Guide. She supported the Society of Women Organists. She directed the John Hill Organ Series. She was a trustee of the Nicholas Danby Trust.

Ennis also taught the organ and had many students.

She described experiencing sexism in her career, such as people assuming she was the page-turner rather than the organist, but also thought that "the rarity of being a woman [organist] led to some positive discrimination". Her subsequent concentration on her post at St Lawrence Jewry was partly to fit work around family life.

=== Organ creation ===
Ennis spearheaded the construction of organs in four buildings in London. These include:

- St Marylebone Parish Church, built by Rieger Orgelbau.
- St Lawrence Jewry, built by Klais Orgelbau.
- Trinity Laban Conservatoire of Music and Dance, built by William Drake.
- Westminster Abbey Lady Chapel, built by Mander Organs.

=== Royal College of Organists ===
Ennis was president of the Royal College of Organists from 1 July 2013 until 30 June 2015. For the 150th anniversary of the Royal College of Organists she welcomed HM the Queen and HRH the Duke of Edinburgh to a celebration at St. George’s Chapel, Windsor. She served as one of the vice presidents and trustees afterwards.

In 2018, Ennis was awarded the RCO Medal.

== Personal life ==
Ennis was married to John Higham QC. They brought up six children, three from Higham's earlier marriage and three whom they had together.

Ennis died from breast cancer on 24 December 2020.
