= Edward Lagrone =

Executed American serial killer

- Born: Edward Lewis Lagrone; March 3, 1957; Fort Worth, Texas, U.S.
- Died: February 11, 2004 (aged 46); Huntsville Unit, Huntsville, Texas, U.S.
- Cause of death: Execution by lethal injection
- Convictions: Capital murder; Murder
- Penalty: 20 years imprisonment (first murder); Death (triple murder)

Details
- Victims: 4–6
- Span of crimes: 1976–1991
- Country: United States
- State: Texas
- Date apprehended: May 30, 1991

Edward Lewis Lagrone (March 3, 1957 – February 11, 2004) was an American serial killer and rapist. He was convicted of fatally shooting three members of the Lloyd family in Fort Worth, Texas in May 1991, including a 10-year-old girl he had impregnated, approximately seven years after being released from prison for a previous murder. Lagrone was subsequently convicted, sentenced to death and executed for the latter crimes in 2004.

== Early life and crimes ==
Edward Lewis Lagrone was born on March 3, 1957, in Fort Worth, Texas, one of several children born in a large family. He grew up in a housing project in the southeastern part of the city and studied up until the 10th grade, when he dropped out of school. On October 3, 1976, he got into an argument with an acquaintance, Michael Anthony Jones, outside the Lucky Lady Lounge, whereupon the two got into a fight. Eventually, Lagrone pulled out a .38 caliber revolver and shot Jones in the head before proceeding to fire the remaining shots into his body. He was arrested and charged with the murder shortly afterwards, but claimed that he was innocent.

Nevertheless, he waived his right to a jury trial and was subsequently convicted for the murder, for which he was given a 20-year prison sentence. Lagrone served only seven years and was released in 1984, but struggled with finding a job due to his criminal record. He eventually managed to find a job as a factory worker, and the year following his release, he became acquainted with a woman named Pamela Lloyd. They soon started a romantic relationship, with Lagrone frequently staying over at her apartment, where Lloyd lived with her children and several relatives. His new relationship did not cause Lagrone to cease his criminal behavior, however, as he would begin sexually assaulting teenage girls whenever the opportunity arose. Fearing that their attacker would kill them if they told anyone, the victims did not contact the authorities about the assaults. His only notable arrests in the following years were two arrests for possession of crack cocaine, in October 1990 and February 1991.

== Triple murder ==
Beginning sometime in 1990, Lagrone started sexually assaulting one of Lloyd's daughters, 9-year-old Shakeisha. Like previous victims, he threatened to kill her if she told anyone, due to which she initially remained silent. However, the abuse was eventually discovered after she began complaining, "Something keeps moving inside me," and was brought for examination at the John Peter Smith Hospital, where doctors made the discovery that she was 17 weeks pregnant. Upon learning this, Shakeisha revealed that Lagrone had repeatedly been raping her for the past year, whereupon all family members cut off contact with him and filed a complaint for sexual assault. To avoid prosecution, Lagrone attempted to bribe Pamela to drop the charges in exchange for $1,500, but she categorically refused. Despite this, police were unable to detain him at the time due to working on a backlog of unrelated crimes.

Angered by their lack of compliance, Lagrone began to threaten the family, saying that he would kill them if they did not drop the charges. When this failed to dissuade them, Lagrone sent his new girlfriend to the Winchester Gallery and Museum, a gun store on the east side of Fort Worth. There she purchased two Winchester Model 1300 12 gauge pump action shotguns with her ID card, as he could not legally acquire firearms on his own as a convicted felon. The two shotguns were sold back to Winchester Gallery by Lagrone's son a week after the murders. The next day, he traveled to Lloyds' apartment and knocked on the door. It was opened by a 48-year-old uncle, Dempsey, who was shot in both arms but survived. Lagrone then entered the house, and upon locating 10-year-old Shakeisha, he shot her in the head, mortally wounding her. He then proceeded to the adjacent rooms, where he shot to death her two great-aunts, 90-year-old Zenobia Anderson and 83-year-old Carola Lloyd, who was blind and deaf. In the meantime, Dempsey, Pamela, and the remaining children managed to escape the apartment and called the police. By their arrival, Lagrone had managed to flee but was soon arrested at his girlfriend's apartment in Arlington. He was then incarcerated at the Tarrant County Jail on a combined bail of $3.45 million – one from his previous sexual assault charge and the other from the murder charges.

At the time, Lagrone was also proposed as a suspect in the double murder of 39-year-old Clifton Demerson and 40-year-old Mary Demerson Daniel, who were shot to death at their apartment in Fort Worth on December 29, 1990. He had previously dated Daniel's daughter and there were allegations that he had abused a family member, but as there was insufficient evidence, he was never charged with this crime.

== Trial, sentence, and imprisonment ==
In the aftermath of his arrest, Lagrone denied any connection to the murders, claiming that he had never impregnated Shakeisha. Both prosecutors and his attorneys offered for paternity tests to be conducted, with the results confirming with 99.9% certainty that he was the father of the unborn fetus. Despite this revelation, Lagrone's attorney claimed that this did not necessarily indicate that his client was guilty of murder, and requested that all physical evidence recovered from the crime scene undergo independent tests.

At the trial, witnesses testified that they heard Lagrone's voice in between the shots being fired and later saw him leaving the premises after the shooting. This was backed up by Dempsey Lloyd, one of the surviving victims, who confirmed that Lagrone was indeed the shooter – upon hearing this, Lagrone snapped and accused him of lying, claiming that they had never seen each other before. His attorney also attempted to convince the jury that the witness testimonies were either contradictory or inconsistent and that Pamela Lloyd named his client as the shooter to put him away for good. This was contradicted by the testimony of his girlfriend and the gun store clerk, who confirmed that the purchase of the two Winchester shotguns the day before the murders – one of these shotguns was later identified as the murder weapon via spent shell casings left behind at the crime scene. In addition to this, Lagrone's girlfriend also claimed that he had told her that he was "going to get them before they get to [him]."

During the trial, two of Lagrone's sisters testified against him, claiming that he had sexually assaulted them at gunpoint at the campus of Sunrise Elementary School in 1986. Neither reported the crime because Lagrone had threatened to burn their house down. Due to the abundant evidence presented against him, Lagrone was found guilty on all charges and sentenced to death.

== Execution ==
In the following years, Lagrone continued to declare his innocence and had seven additional paternity tests conducted, all of which concluded that he was the father of Shakeisha Lloyd's unborn child. All of his appeals were rejected, and he was eventually executed via lethal injection at the Huntsville Unit on February 11, 2004.

His last words were the following: "I just want to say I'm not sad today. I'm not bitter with anyone. As I've said from day one, I didn't go in there and kill them, but I'm no better than the people that did. Jesus is Lord."

He is buried at Captain Joe Byrd Cemetery.

== See also ==
- Capital punishment in Texas
- List of people executed by lethal injection
- List of people executed in Texas, 2000–2009
- List of people executed in the United States in 2004
- List of serial killers in the United States
