= Jon Robinson =

Jon Robinson may refer to:

- Jon Robinson (American football) (born 1976), American football executive
- Jon Robinson (announcer) (born 1960), American radio and television personality
- Jon-John Robinson (born 1970), American record producer and songwriter

== See also ==
- Jonathan Robinson (disambiguation)
- John Robinson (disambiguation)
