= St Lawrence Jewry =

Coordinates: 51.5152°N 0.0925°W

St Lawrence Jewry next Guildhall
- Guild Church of Saint Lawrence, Old Jewry next the Guildhall
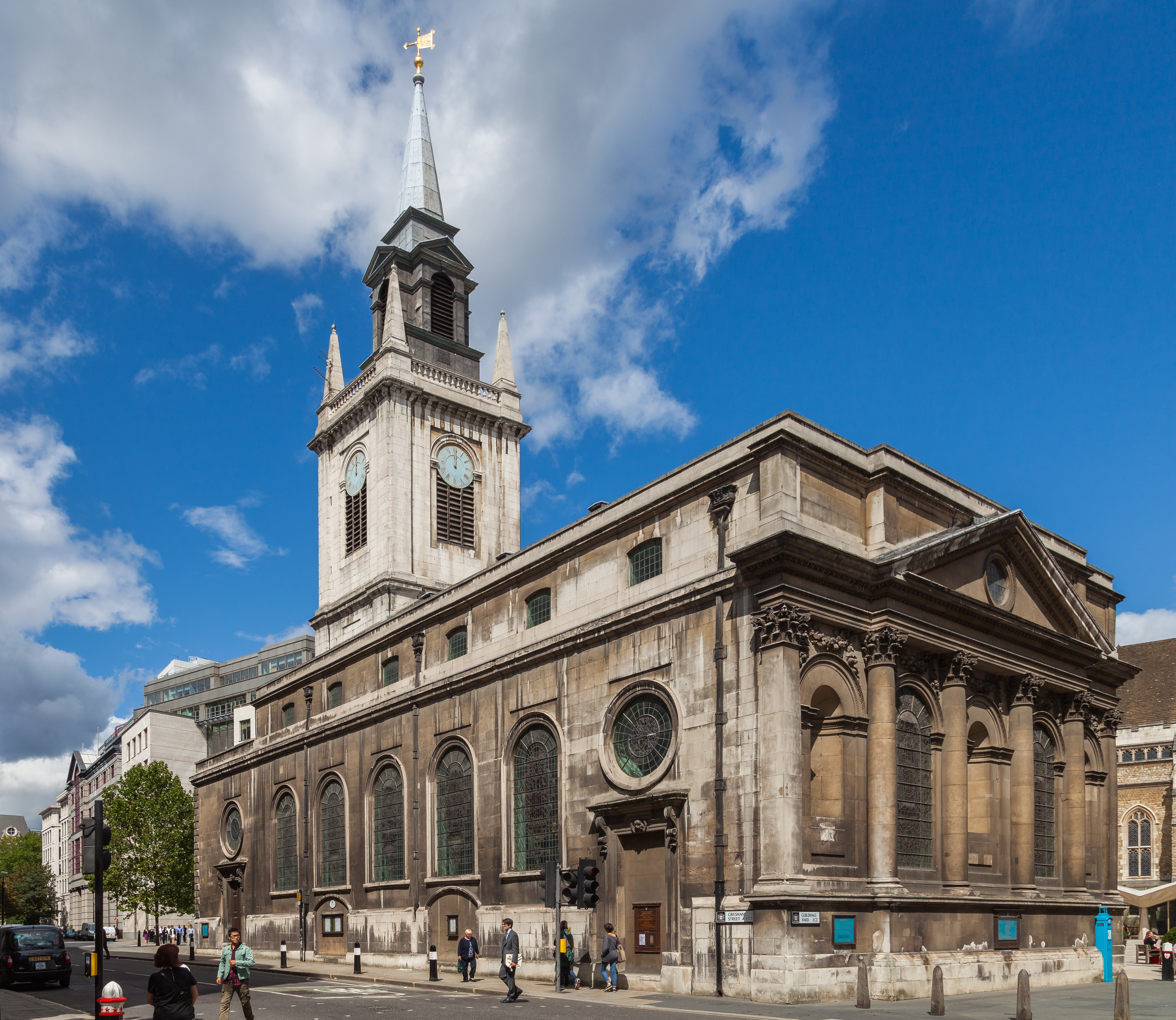
- St Lawrence Jewry from the south-east
- OS grid reference: TQ 32458 81325
- Location: Guildhall Yard, City of London, EC2
- Country: England
- Denomination: Church of England
- Previous denomination: Roman Catholic (to 1538)
- Website: stlawrencejewry.org.uk

History
- Founded: 12th century
- Dedication: Lawrence of Rome

Architecture
- Heritage designation: Grade I listed building
- Architect: Christopher Wren
- Style: English Baroque

Administration
- Diocese: London

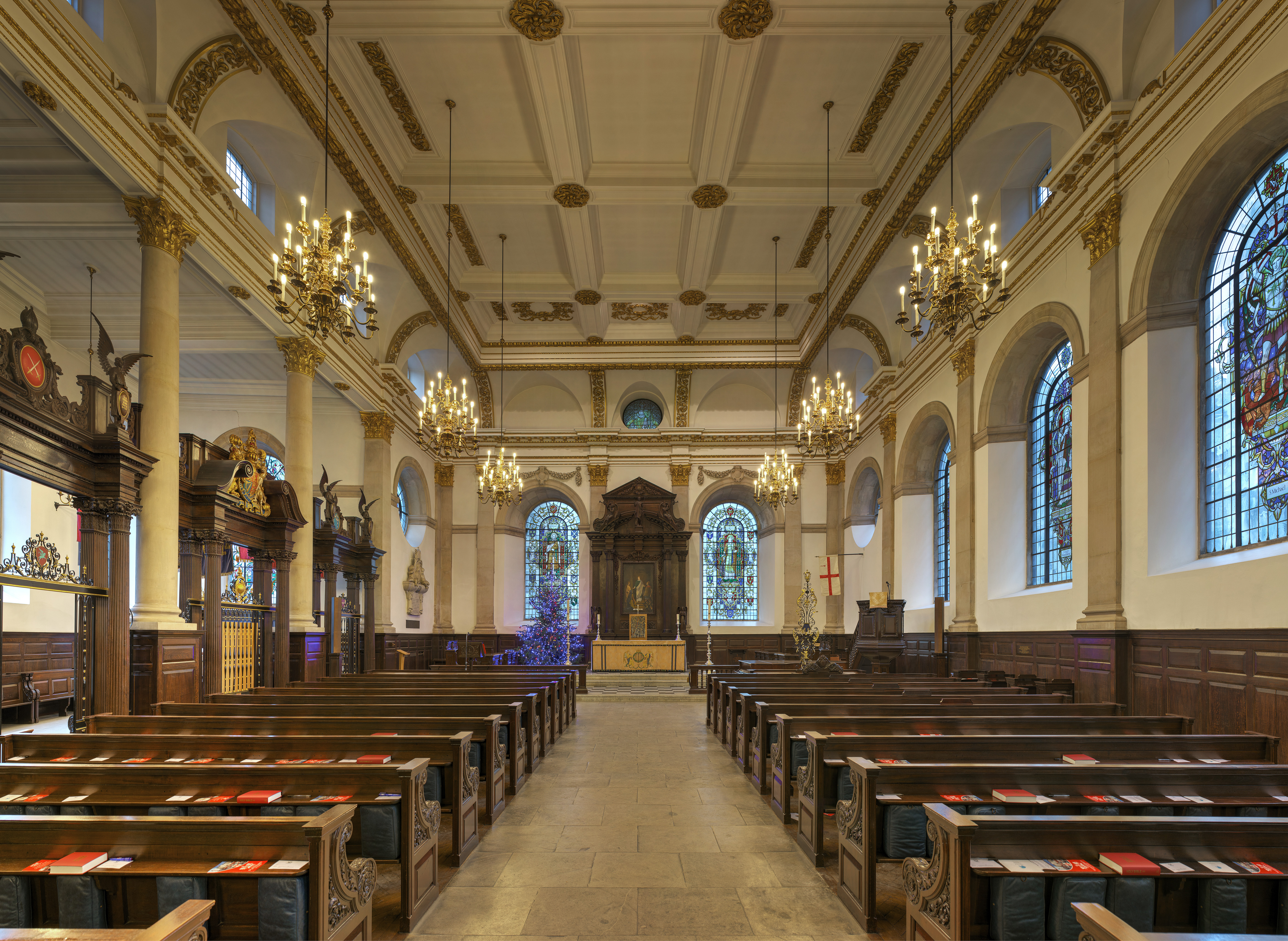
Interior of St Lawrence Jewry

St Lawrence Jewry next Guildhall is a Church of England guild church in the City of London on Gresham Street, next to the Guildhall. It was destroyed in the Great Fire of London in 1666, and rebuilt to the designs of Sir Christopher Wren. It is the official church of the Lord Mayor of London.

== History ==
=== Medieval era ===
The church was originally built in the twelfth century and dedicated to St Lawrence; the weathervane of the present church is in the form of his instrument of martyrdom, the gridiron. The church is near the former medieval Jewish ghetto, which was centred on the street named Old Jewry. From 1280 it was an advowson held by Balliol College, Oxford.

It is thought that the unusual alignment of the church may be because it was built on the site of the London Roman Amphitheatre, which was rediscovered as recently as 1988. Its remains can now be visited beneath the Guildhall Art Gallery.

Sir Thomas More preached in the old church on this site.

=== 17th century ===
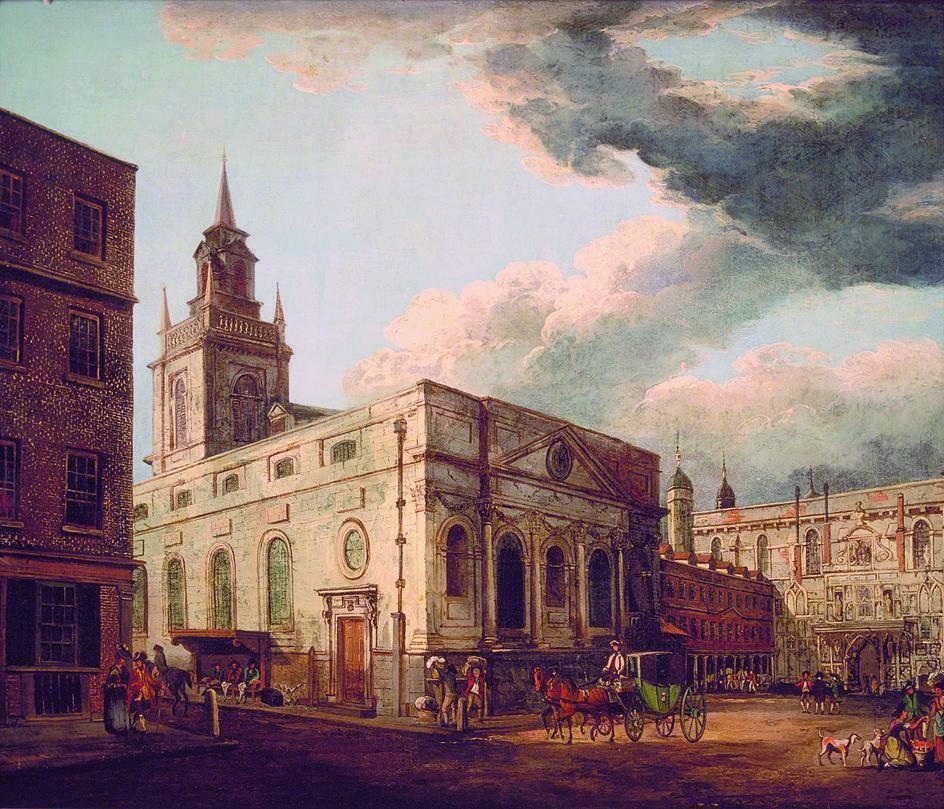
Painting of St Lawrence Jewry by Thomas Malton, 18th century

In 1618 the church was repaired, and all the windows filled with stained glass paid for by individual donors.

The medieval church was destroyed in the Great Fire of London and built anew by Christopher Wren between 1670 and 1677. The parish was united with that of St Mary Magdalen, Milk Street, which was not rebuilt. The church is entirely faced in stone, with a grand east front, on which four attached Corinthian columns, raised on a basement, support a pediment placed against a high attic. George Godwin, writing in 1839, described the details of this facade as displaying " a purity of feeling almost Grecian", while pointing out that Wren's pediment acts only as a superficial adornment to the wall, rather than, as in Classical architecture, forming an extension of the roof.

Inside, Wren's church has an aisle on the north side only, divided from the nave by Corinthian columns, carrying an entablature that continues around the walls of the main body of the church, where it is supported on pilasters. The ceiling is divided into sunken panels, ornamented with wreaths and branches. The church is 81 feet (25 m) long and 68 feet (21 m) wide.

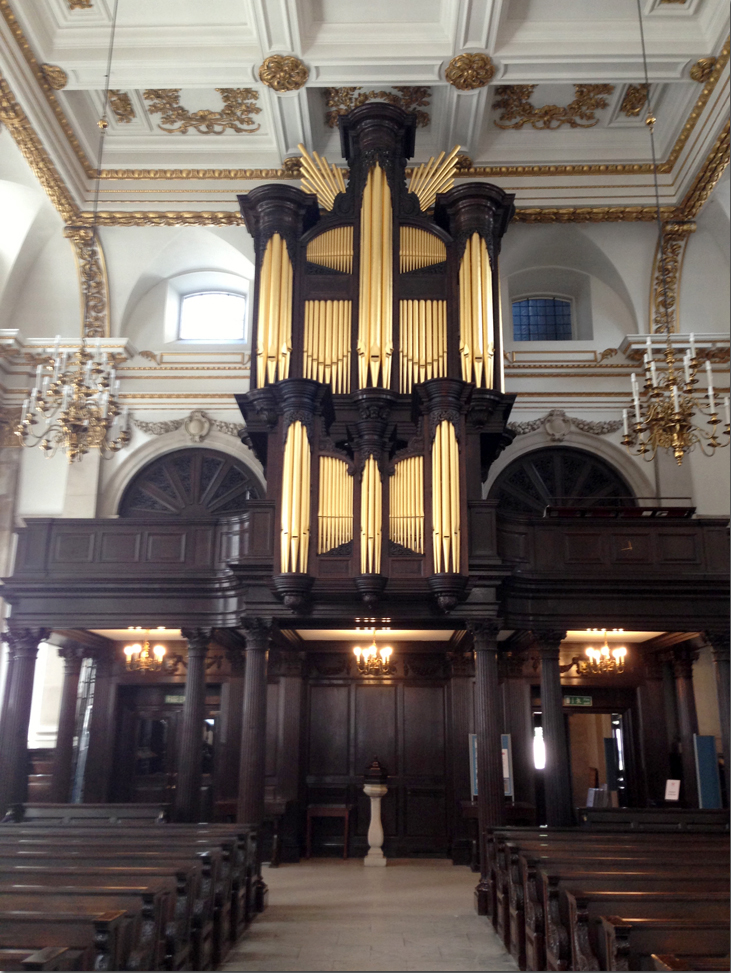
Interior, looking east toward the organ at the rear of the church

=== 20th century ===
The church suffered extensive damage during the Blitz on 29 December 1940, and after the war the City of London Corporation agreed to restore it as Balliol College did not have the funds to do so. It was restored in 1957 by the architect Cecil Brown to Wren's original design. It is now a guild church which does not have its own parish and is not responsible to the parish authorities in its locality; it does not have to hold Sunday services.

The church was described by Sir John Betjeman as "very municipal, very splendid." It was designated a Grade I listed building on 4 January 1950.

It has a ring of eight bells, hung for change ringing, and cast in 1957 by Whitechapel Bell Foundry

The church was the burial place of John Tillotson, the Archbishop of Canterbury from 1691 to 1694; and of merchant Francis Levett, as well as the site of the wedding of his niece Ann Levett, daughter of William Levett, Dean of Bristol and former Principal of Magdalen Hall, Oxford.

The church is used by the New Zealand Society UK, who celebrate Waitangi Day here in February each year.

The livery companies and guilds currently associated with the church are the Girdlers, Loriners, Distillers, Actuaries, Insurers, Chartered Architects, Constructors, and Entrepreneurs.

== Vicars (incomplete list) ==
- 1424 Richard Collyng
- 1566–1570 William Palmer
- 1578–81 Samuel Perkins
- 1650–1656 Richard Vines was minister
- 1657–1659 Edward Reynolds
- 1661–1662 Seth Ward
- 1662–1668 John Wilkins
- 1668–1683 Benjamin Whichcote
- 1686–1721 John Mapletoft
- 1857–1872 Benjamin Cowie
- 1898–1920 James Stephen Barrass
- 2007–2021 David Parrott
- 2021- James Titley

== Organists (incomplete list) ==
- Theodore Aylward (1762 to 1788)
- Margaret Cobb (introduced first lunchtime recitals, 1957)
- Nicholas Jackson (1974 to 1977)
- Catherine Ennis 1985 to 2020
- James McVinnie (from 2021)

== See also ==
- St Lawrence and Mary Magdalene Drinking Fountain
- List of churches and cathedrals of London
- List of Christopher Wren churches in London
