= John Robison =

John Robison may refer to:

- John Robison (physicist) (1739–1805), Scottish physicist, inventor, and conspiracy theorist
- Sir John Robison (inventor) (1778–1843), his son, Scottish inventor and writer
- John J. Robison (1824–1897), 19th-century Michigan politician
- John Elder Robison (born 1956), author of the 2007 memoir, Look Me in the Eye: My Life with Asperger's

== See also ==
- John Robinson (disambiguation)
