= List of people executed in the United States in 2004 =

Fifty-nine people, all male, were executed in the United States in 2004, fifty-eight by lethal injection and one, James Neil Tucker, was executed by electrocution. Twenty-three of them were carried out in Texas.

== List of people executed in the United States in 2004 ==
No.	Date of execution	Name	Age of person			Gender	Ethnicity	State	Method	Ref.
No.	Date of execution	Name	At execution	At offense	Age difference	Gender	Ethnicity	State	Method	Ref.
1	January 6, 2004	Ynobe Katron Matthews	27	24	3	Male	Black	Texas	Lethal injection	
2	January 6, 2004	Charles Laverne Singleton	44	20	24	Male	Black	Arkansas	Lethal injection	
3	January 9, 2004	Raymond Dayle Rowsey	32	20	12	Male	White	North Carolina	Lethal injection	
4	January 13, 2004	Tyrone Peter Darks	39	29	10	Male	Black	Oklahoma	Lethal injection	
5	January 14, 2004	Lewis Williams Jr.	45	24	21	Male	Black	Ohio	Lethal injection	
6	January 14, 2004	Kenneth Eugene Bruce	32	19	13	Male	Black	Texas	Lethal injection	
7	January 21, 2004	Kevin Lee Zimmerman	42	26	16	Male	White	Texas	Lethal injection	
8	January 28, 2004	Billy Frank Vickers	58	47	11	Male	White	Texas	Lethal injection	
9	February 3, 2004	John Glenn Roe	41	22	19	Male	White	Ohio	Lethal injection	
10	February 4, 2004	Johnny Leartice Robinson	51	33	18	Male	Black	Florida	Lethal injection	
11	February 11, 2004	Edward Lewis Lagrone	46	34	12	Male	Black	Texas	Lethal injection	
12	February 12, 2004	Bobby Ray Hopkins	36	26	10	Male	Black	Texas	Lethal injection	
13	February 17, 2004	Norman Richard Cleary	38	25	13	Male	White	Oklahoma	Lethal injection	
14	February 17, 2004	Cameron Todd Willingham	36	23	13	Male	White	Texas	Lethal injection	
15	March 3, 2004	Marcus Bridger Cotton	29	21	8	Male	Black	Texas	Lethal injection	
16	March 9, 2004	David Jay Brown	49	33	16	Male	White	Oklahoma	Lethal injection	
17	March 18, 2004	Brian Lee Cherrix	30	20	10	Male	White	Virginia	Lethal injection	
18	March 19, 2004	David Clayton Hill	39	29	10	Male	White	South Carolina	Lethal injection	
19	March 23, 2004	Hung Thanh Le	37	25	12	Male	Asian	Oklahoma	Lethal injection	
20	March 26, 2004	Lawrence Colwell Jr.	35	25	10	Male	White	Nevada	Lethal injection	
21	March 30, 2004	William Dean Wickline Jr.	52	30	22	Male	White	Ohio	Lethal injection	
22	March 31, 2004	Dennis Mitchell Orbe	39	33	6	Male	White	Virginia	Lethal injection	
23	April 16, 2004	Jerry Bridwell McWee	51	38	13	Male	White	South Carolina	Lethal injection	
24	April 23, 2004	Jason Scott Byram	38	27	11	Male	White	South Carolina	Lethal injection	
25	May 18, 2004	Kelsey Patterson	50	38	12	Male	Black	Texas	Lethal injection	
26	May 26, 2004	John Richard Blackwelder	49	45	4	Male	White	Florida	Lethal injection	
27	May 28, 2004	James Neil Tucker	47	35	12	Male	White	South Carolina	Electrocution	
28	June 8, 2004	William Gerald Zuern Jr.	45	25	20	Male	White	Ohio	Lethal injection	
29	June 8, 2004	Robert Leroy Bryan	63	52	11	Male	White	Oklahoma	Lethal injection	
30	June 17, 2004	Steven Howard Oken	42	25	17	Male	White	Maryland	Lethal injection	
31	June 30, 2004	David Ray Harris	43	24	19	Male	White	Texas	Lethal injection	
32	July 1, 2004	Robert Karl Hicks	47	28	19	Male	White	Georgia	Lethal injection	
33	July 14, 2004	Stephen Allen Vrabel	47	32	15	Male	White	Ohio	Lethal injection	
34	July 19, 2004	Eddie Albert Crawford	57	36	21	Male	White	Georgia	Lethal injection	
35	July 20, 2004	Scott Andrew Mink	40	36	4	Male	White	Ohio	Lethal injection	
36	July 22, 2004	Mark Wesley Bailey	34	28	6	Male	White	Virginia	Lethal injection	
37	August 5, 2004	James Barney Hubbard	74	46	28	Male	White	Alabama	Lethal injection	
38	August 12, 2004	Terry Jess Dennis	57	52	5	Male	White	Nevada	Lethal injection	
39	August 18, 2004	James Bryant Hudson	56	54	2	Male	White	Virginia	Lethal injection	
40	August 25, 2004	Jasen Shane Busby	28	19	9	Male	White	Texas	Lethal injection	
41	August 26, 2004	Windel Ray Workman	46	29	17	Male	White	Oklahoma	Lethal injection	
42	August 26, 2004	James Vernon Allridge III	41	22	19	Male	Black	Texas	Lethal injection	
43	September 9, 2004	James Edward Reid	58	51	7	Male	Black	Virginia	Lethal injection	
44	September 21, 2004	Andrew Perez Flores	32	20	12	Male	Hispanic	Texas	Lethal injection	
45	September 30, 2004	David Kevin Hocker	33	26	7	Male	White	Alabama	Lethal injection	
46	October 5, 2004	Edward Green III	30	18	12	Male	Black	Texas	Lethal injection	
47	October 6, 2004	Peter J. Miniel	42	23	19	Male	Hispanic	Texas	Lethal injection	
48	October 8, 2004	Sammy Crystal Perkins	51	38	13	Male	Black	North Carolina	Lethal injection	
49	October 12, 2004	Donald Loren Aldrich	39	29	10	Male	White	Texas	Lethal injection	
50	October 13, 2004	Adremy Dennis	28	18	10	Male	Black	Ohio	Lethal injection	
51	October 20, 2004	Ricky Eugene Morrow	53	30	23	Male	White	Texas	Lethal injection	
52	October 22, 2004	Charles Wesley Roache	30	25	5	Male	White	North Carolina	Lethal injection	
53	October 26, 2004	Dominique Jerome Green	30	18	12	Male	Black	Texas	Lethal injection	
54	November 2, 2004	Lorenzo Morris	52	37	15	Male	Black	Texas	Lethal injection	
55	November 4, 2004	Robert Brice Morrow	47	38	9	Male	White	Texas	Lethal injection	
56	November 9, 2004	Demarco Markeith McCullum	30	19	11	Male	Black	Texas	Lethal injection	
57	November 10, 2004	Frederick Patrick McWilliams	30	22	8	Male	Black	Texas	Lethal injection	
58	November 12, 2004	Frank Ray Chandler	32	20	12	Male	White	North Carolina	Lethal injection	
59	November 17, 2004	Anthony Guy Fuentes	30	19	11	Male	Hispanic	Texas	Lethal injection	
		Average:	42 years	29 years	13 years					

== Demographics ==
Gender
Male	59	100%
Female	0	0%
Ethnicity
White	36	61%
Black	19	32%
Hispanic	3	5%
Asian	1	2%
State
Texas	23	39%
Ohio	7	12%
Oklahoma	6	10%
Virginia	5	8%
North Carolina	4	7%
South Carolina	4	7%
Alabama	2	3%
Florida	2	3%
Georgia	2	3%
Nevada	2	3%
Arkansas	1	2%
Maryland	1	2%
Method
Lethal injection	58	98%
Electrocution	1	2%
Month
January	8	14%
February	6	10%
March	8	14%
April	2	3%
May	3	5%
June	4	7%
July	5	8%
August	6	10%
September	3	5%
October	8	14%
November	6	10%
December	0	0%
Age
20–29	4	7%
30–39	23	39%
40–49	18	31%
50–59	12	20%
60–69	1	2%
70–79	1	2%
Total	59	100%

== Executions in recent years ==
Number of executions
2005	60
2004	59
2003	65
Total	184

== See also ==
- List of death row inmates in the United States
- List of most recent executions by jurisdiction
- List of people scheduled to be executed in the United States
- List of women executed in the United States since 1976

Preceded by 2003	List of people executed in the United States in 2004	Succeeded by 2005
