= USS Yucca (1864) =

Gunboat of the United States Navy

History

United States
- Laid down: date unknown
- Launched: 1864
- Acquired: 25 February 1865
- Commissioned: 3 April 1865
- Out of service: 1868
- Stricken: 1868 (est.)
- Fate: Sold, 26 August 1868

General characteristics
- Displacement: 373 tons
- Length: 145 ft 7 in (44.37 m)
- Beam: 23 ft 7 in (7.19 m)
- Depth of hold: 11 ft 3 in (3.43 m)
- Propulsion: steam engine; screw-propelled
- Speed: not known
- Complement: not known
- Armament: one 30-pounder Parrott rifle; one 12-pounder smoothbore gun

USS Yucca was a steamer acquired by the Union Navy during the American Civil War. She was used by the Union Navy as a gunboat in support of the Union Navy security of Confederate waterways.

== Commissioned in Boston shortly before civil war’s end ==
Yucca—a wooden-hulled screw steamer built in 1864 by Donald McKay at East Boston, Massachusetts—was purchased by the Navy on 25 February 1865 and was commissioned at Boston on 3 April 1865, Acting Master Henry C. Wade in command.

== Assigned to patrol the Gulf Station ==
Commissioned just six days before General Robert E. Lee surrendered the Army of Northern Virginia effectively ending the American Civil War, Yucca saw no combat in that or any other conflict. Her period of active service covered only three years, most of which she spent on the Gulf Station in the Gulf of Mexico. One sailor, Captain of the Hold John Robinson, was awarded the Medal of Honor for swimming ashore during a storm to aid Yucca on 19 January 1867.

== Placed in ordinary ==
By 1868, she had moved to Portsmouth, New Hampshire, where she was placed in ordinary.

== Post-war decommissioning and sale ==
On 26 August 1868, Yucca was sold at Portsmouth to Mr. R. M. Funkhauser.

== See also ==
- Union Navy
- Union Blockade
