= John C. Robinson (biologist) =

- Born: 1959 (age 66–67)
- Education: Iowa State University
- Scientific career
- Fields: Biology
- Workplaces: United States Department of Agriculture; United States Fish & Wildlife Service

John C. Robinson (born 1959) is an American biologist, environmental advocate, and author. He studied biology at Iowa State University and devoted the rest of his career to becoming a professional ornithologist. He worked for the United States Department of Agriculture (1979-1988) and the United States Fish & Wildlife Service (1988-) and served on the board of directors for the American Birding Association. He is the recipient of Audubon's Toyota TogetherGreen fellowship and the author of several ornithology reference books, including Common Birds of Mount Diablo and the North American Bird Reference Book.

As an African American environmentalist, a significant part of his advocacy work is focused on making minorities, in particular minority youth and young adults, more engaged with the environment through bird watching, a topic that he wrote about in his 2008 book Birding for Everyone: Encouraging People of Color to Become Birdwatchers.
