= John D. Robinson (psychologist) =

American psychologist

- Born: August 24, 1946
- Died: July 4, 2021 (aged 74–75)
- Education: EdD, MPH
- Alma mater: Harvard University
- Occupation: Psychologist
- Employer: Howard University College of Medicine
- Notable work: Diversity in Human Interactions: The Tapestry of America

Dr. John D. Robinson (August 24, 1946 - July 4, 2021) was a psychologist and Professor Emeritus of Psychiatry and Surgery at Howard University College of Medicine. In 1973, Robinson became the first African-American psychologist in the U.S. Air Force, and, in 1975, the first African-American psychologist in the U.S. Navy. He also served as the first African-American administrator at the University of Texas at Austin.

Robinson graduated from the University of Texas at Austin (BA, Human Physiology and Biochemistry, 1968; MA, Counseling Psychology, 1969), University of Massachusetts at Amherst (EdD, Counseling Psychology, 1972), and Harvard University (MPH, Behavioral Science, 1981), and received an honorary doctorate from the Massachusetts School of Professional Psychology (now the William James College), where he endowed the first scholarship specifically in support of ethnically diverse students.

He edited Diversity in Human Interactions: The Tapestry of America, a widely used text for diversity training in military and university settings. He was president of the American Board of Clinical Psychology and the American Board of Clinical Health Psychology of the American Board of Professional Psychology

Robinson is a recipient of the Stanley Sue Award for Distinguished Contributions to Diversity in Clinical Psychology from the American Psychological Association and the Joseph Matarrazo Award for Distinguished Service and Contributions to Clinical Health Psychology from the Association of Psychologists in Academic Health Centers (APAHC). In 2012, the Society for the Psychological Study of Ethnic Minority Issues established the Asuncion Miteria Austria and John Robinson Distinguished Mentoring Award. He has received several national professional awards and honors.
