= St Lawrence and Mary Magdalene Drinking Fountain =

Fountain in London, United Kingdom

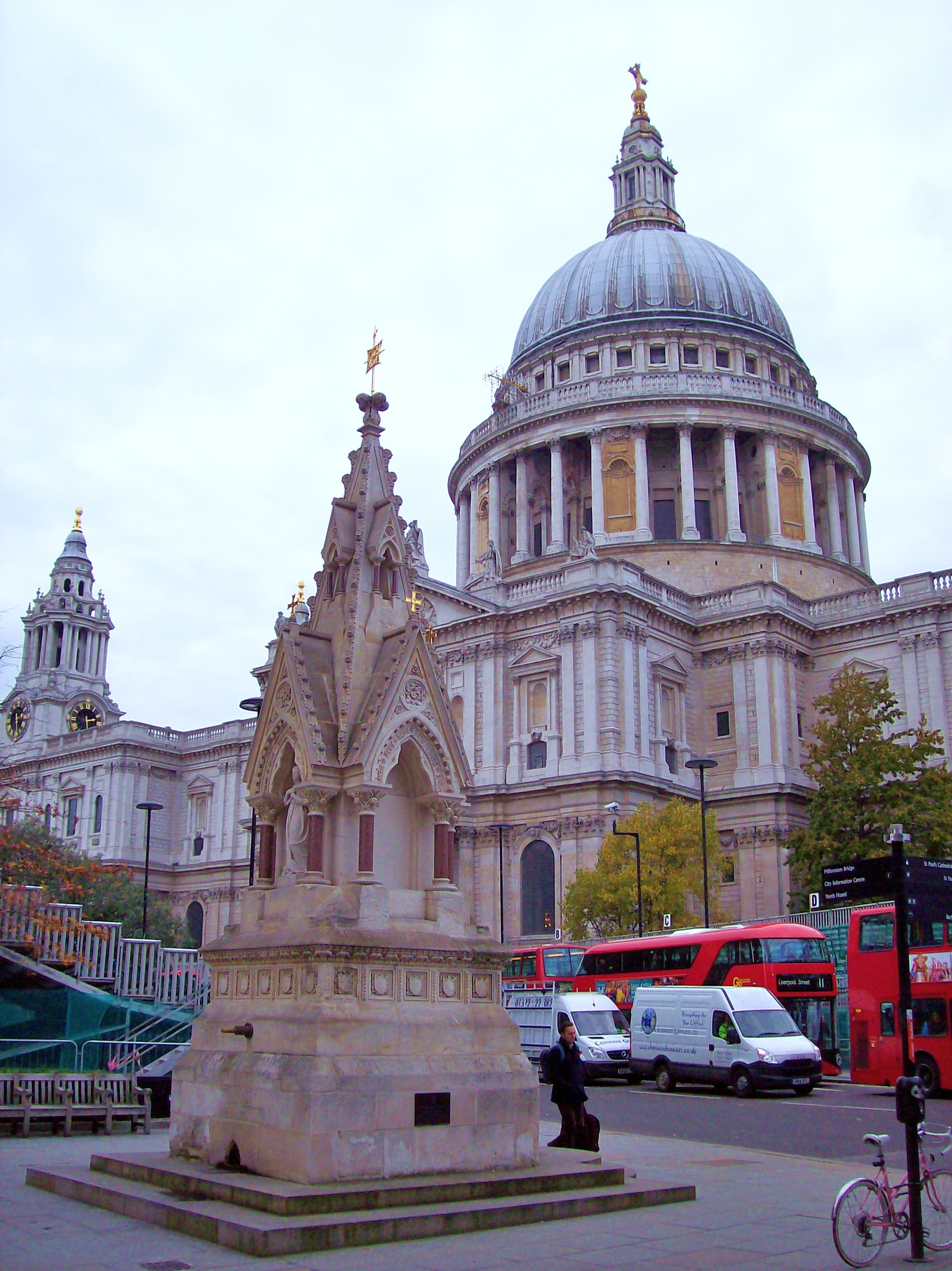
- The fountain in 2014, with St Paul's Cathedral visible behind it

- Artist: John Robinson
- Year: 1866
- Medium: Bronze
- Location: Carter Lane Gardens; London; 51°30′47″N 0°05′50″W

The St Lawrence and Mary Magdalene Drinking Fountain is a drinking fountain on the eastern side of Carter Lane Gardens, near St Paul's Cathedral in London.

== Design ==
The fountain was designed by the architect John Robinson. It features bronze sculpture by the artist Joseph Durham. It includes statues of the saints Lawrence and Mary Magdalene.

== History ==
The fountain was originally installed in 1866 outside the church of St Lawrence Jewry. It was dismantled into 150 pieces in the 1970s which were stored in a vault in the City of London for fifteen years, and after that in a barn at a farm in Epping. The pieces were sent to a foundry in Chichester for reassembly in 2009. The fountain was reassembled in its current location in 2010.
