= John Robinson (historian) =

English cleric and historian (1774–1840)

John Robinson D.D. (1774–1840) was an English cleric and scholar, known as a historian.

== Life ==
Born of poor parentage at Temple Sowerby, Westmorland on 4 January 1774, he was educated at Penrith grammar school and Christ's College, Cambridge, where he was admitted a sizar 1 January 1807. As a ten-year man he was a Cambridge graduate. His D.D. is presumed a Lambeth degree by Venn.

Robinson was master of Ravenstonedale grammar school, Westmorland, from 1795 to 1818, perpetual curate of Ravenstonedale from 25 June 1813 to 1833, and rector from 31 July 1818 of Clifton, and from 12 August 1833 of Cliburn.

== Works ==
Robinson's works were:

- An Easy Grammar of History, Ancient and Modern, 1806; new edition, enlarged by John Tillotson, with the title A Grammar of History, Ancient and Modern, 1855.
- Modern History, for the use of Schools, 1807.
- Archæologia Græca, 1807; 2nd edit. 1827.
- A Theological, Biblical, Ecclesiastical Dictionary, 1815; 3rd edit. 1835.
- Ancient History: exhibiting a Summary View of the Rise, Progress, Revolutions, Decline, and Fall of the States and Nations of Antiquity, 1831 (expanded from the Easy Grammar).
- Universal Modern History: exhibiting the Rise, Progress, and Revolutions of various Nations from the Age of Mahomet to the Present Time, 1839 (expanded from the ‘Modern History for the use of Schools’).

Robinson also compiled a Guide to the Lakes in Cumberland, Westmoreland, and Lancashire, illustrated with Twenty Views of Local Scenery and a Travelling Map of the Adjacent Country, 1819; and contributed the letterpress to an unfinished series of Views of the Lakes in the North of England, from Original Paintings by the most Eminent Artists, 1833. His Ancient History formed the basis of Francis Young's Ancient History: a Synopsis of the Rise, Progress, Decline, and Fall of the States and Nations of Antiquity, London, 1873, 4 vols.

== Notes ==
Attribution

- This article incorporates text from a publication now in the public domain: Lee, Sidney, ed. (1897). "Robinson, John (1774–1840)". Dictionary of National Biography. Vol. 49. London: Smith, Elder & Co.
