= John Robinson (botanist) =

American botanist (1846–1925)

- Robinson, c. 1880
- Born: July 13, 1846; Salem, Massachusetts, U.S.
- Died: April 9, 1925 (aged 78); Salem, Massachusetts, U.S.
- Spouse: Elizabeth Robbins Robinson (née Kimble)
- Children: John Robinson Jr.
- Scientific career
- Fields: Botany
- Workplaces: Peabody Essex Museum
- Author abbrev. (botany): J.Rob.

John Robinson (July 13, 1846 – April 9, 1925) was an American botanist from Salem, Massachusetts. From 1875 until his death in 1925, he was the treasurer of the Peabody Academy of Science, and the keeper of its Marine Room. Robinson designed the Ropes Mansion Garden in 1912, and is credited with coining the common name "Christmas fern" for the species Polystichum acrostichoides in 1873.
