= Johnny Leartice Robinson =

American murderer (1952–2004)

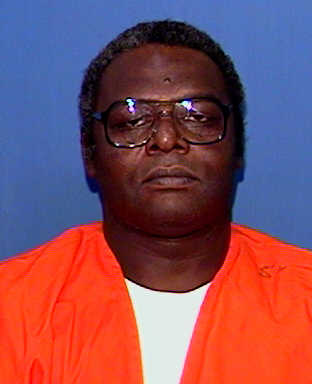
- Mugshot of Robinson
- Born: July 25, 1952; United States
- Died: February 4, 2004 (aged 51); Florida State Prison, Florida, U.S.
- Status: Executed by lethal injection
- Convictions: First degree murder, rape, kidnapping, armed robbery
- Penalty: Death

Johnny Leartice Robinson (July 25, 1952 – February 4, 2004) was an American criminal executed by the State of Florida for the 1985 murder of Beverly St. George.

== Background, case and execution ==
Robinson had faced several criminal charges before being arrested for murder; he was convicted of several previous rapes and was on parole for a rape conviction in Maryland at the time of Beverly St. George's murder. On August 11, 1985, Robinson and 16-year-old Clinton Fields were travelling from along I-95 in Florida when they came upon St. George's car, which had broken down along the highway.

Robinson took St. George to a nearby cemetery where Robinson claimed that the two had consensual sex on the hood of a car. Prosecutors contended that she was sexually assaulted. St. George was shot twice, but Robinson claimed that the gun "accidentally" fired, hitting her in the face, and that he then shot her again to make sure she was dead, claiming "How do you tell someone I accidentally shot a white woman?" Clinton Fields, Robinson's co-defendant, testified at trial that Robinson abducted St. George at gunpoint and had planned to kill her.

Robinson and Fields were arrested several days later following another rape and robbery. Based largely upon Fields' testimony, Robinson was convicted and sentenced to death in June 1986; Fields was sentenced to life in prison. On appeal, Robinson's death sentence was overturned by the Florida Supreme Court; his attorneys contended that questions and statements made by prosecutors amounted to racial bias against Robinson. A second sentencing hearing in 1989 restored the death sentence.

During further appeals, Robinson's defense lawyers continued to contend that Robinson was the victim of racial discrimination, that he was abused as a child, and that Fields, with an IQ of 50, was coerced by prosecutors into giving false testimony. (Fields did recant his trial testimony in January 2004.) Final appeals to the United States Supreme Court challenged the process of lethal injection as cruel and unusual punishment.

Robinson was scheduled to be executed at 6:00 p.m. on February 4, 2004, but less than 15 minutes before the scheduled time, the United States Supreme Court contacted the Florida governor's office, asking the state to briefly halt the execution; the court returned their decision about an hour later, refusing, on a vote of 5–4, to halt the execution.

Robinson's final meal prior to his execution was fried chicken gizzards, french fries, smoked sausage, and butter pecan ice cream. His final words before being executed by lethal injection were: "Yep... Later!" Robinson was pronounced dead at Florida State Prison in Raiford at 7:34 p.m. on February 4, 2004. His execution was the 895th carried out in the United States since the death penalty was reinstated in 1976, and the 58th in Florida.

== See also ==
- Capital punishment in Florida
- Capital punishment in the United States
- List of people executed in Florida
- List of people executed in the United States in 2004

== General references ==
- Johnny L. Robinson. The Clark County Prosecuting Attorney. Retrieved on 2007-11-13.
- Inmate Release Information Detail - Inmate 102767. Florida Department of Corrections. Retrieved on 2007-11-14.
