= William Wickline =

Executed American serial killer

- Born: William Dean Wickline Jr. March 15, 1952; Reynoldsburg, Ohio, U.S.
- Died: March 30, 2004 (aged 52); Southern Ohio Correctional Facility, Ohio, U.S.
- Other name: "The Butcher"
- Status: Executed by lethal injection
- Convictions: Aggravated murder (2 counts); Breaking and entering (3 counts); Grand theft Drug law violation
- Penalty: Death

Details
- Victims: 3–5+
- Span of crimes: 1979–1982
- Country: United States
- States: West Virginia, Ohio
- Date apprehended: 1982

William Dean Wickline Jr. (March 15, 1952 – March 30, 2004), known as The Butcher, was an American career criminal and serial killer linked to at least three violent murders committed in West Virginia and Ohio from 1979 to 1982. Convicted of killing the latter victims, whose bodies were never found, Wickline was sentenced to death and subsequently executed in 2004.

== Early life ==
William Dean Wickline Jr. was born on March 15, 1952, in Reynoldsburg, Ohio, one of several sons born to William Sr. and Irma Wickline (née Bolen). He grew up in what was described as a loving family, and during his youth, Wickline was regarded as a good student with a promising career in athletics. Despite these expectations and him being in his high school's wrestling team, Wickline's grades fell drastically and he became known as a small-time delinquent whose most egregious offense was egging his principal's car.

Wickline's first arrest came in 1971, at age 19, and until 1984, he would be arrested at least nine more times for charges ranging from burglary and dealing drugs to running a prostitution ring. During his incarcerations, he would spend much of his time doing pastimes such as lifting weights and studying psychology, and would integrate himself further within the prison system. After spending several years in different prisons around the state, Wickline would eventually be released yet again in November 1979, and after a temporary break-up with his girlfriend, he started displaying increasingly violent tendencies. During this period, he developed an affinity for knives and had numerous short-term relationships with various women, whom he verbally threatened on a few occasions. According to a friend of his, Wickline also allegedly participated in a group that conducted animal sacrifices and other violent activities, but this was never conclusively proven.

== Murders ==
=== Confirmed ===
On November 11, 1979, the body of a 34-year-old construction worker from Columbia, South Carolina, Charles Morgan Marsh, was found on his bed at a hotel room in Parkersburg, West Virginia. Marsh's head had been decapitated and placed on the nightstand beside the bed, while his headless body had his hands handcuffed behind his back. Upon conducting the autopsy, coroners determined that the cause of death was strangulation with a telephone cord and that the murderer had severed the head with one or two cuts, indicating he was a skilled butcher. Most peculiarly, it was also determined that Marsh's killer had also taken his time to comb the hair of his victim's severed head. The violent nature of the crime and the fact that Marsh was a known drug dealer led investigators to believe that this was a likely contract killing, possibly by a rival dealer who wanted to prevent him from encroaching on his territory, but at the time, no suspect could be identified.

On August 14, 1982, Wickline and his girlfriend Teresa Kemp went to Columbus, Ohio to settle a $6,000 drug debt with Christopher and Peggy Lerch, a couple from Blendon Township who were involved in the drug trafficking business. After the argument, Wickline asked that Christopher accompany him to the upstairs bathroom, ostensibly to help him with a clogged tub drain, but while he was looking inside the tub, Wickline took out a knife and slit his throat. Deciding that he needed to get rid of Peggy as well, as she could be a potential witness, Wickline threatened to harm Kemp if she did not help him out by holding the sleeping woman's legs while he proceeded to strangle her to death with a rope. After killing both of the Lerches, Wickline transported their bodies to the bath tub, where he decapitated and dismembered their remains, which he then placed in plastic garbage bags. Afterwards, with Kemp's help, the pair dumped them in various garbage containers across Franklin County. As a sort of souvenir, Wickline kept Peggy's wedding ring. The Lerches' remains have never been located.

== Trial, imprisonment and execution ==
Shortly after the Lerches' disappearances, Wickline was arrested for breaking into a drug store in Nelsonville, for which he was given a year and a half sentence at the Pickaway Correctional Institution in Orient. Almost two years later, in December 1984, he was indicted in the Lerch case after Kemp confessed the crime to the authorities. Before he could even be officially charged, Wickline was additionally linked to the Marsh murder in West Virginia, and was proposed as a suspect in several other violent crimes involving dismemberment. However, he was nonetheless tried solely for the Lerches' murders, which began on July 30, 1985. A little more than a week later, he was found guilty on two counts of aggravated murder. On September 20, he was sentenced to death for Peggy's murder and to life imprisonment for Christopher's, to which he showed no emotion. While charges were filed in the Marsh murder, they were eventually dropped and the case closed due to Wickline's death sentence.

For the remainder of his life behind bars, Wickline unsuccessfully appealed to both state and federal courts, all of which rejected his appeals. After exhausting all of his appeals, Wickline was executed via lethal injection at the Southern Ohio Correctional Facility on March 30, 2004. His final meal consisted of an eight-ounce medium-rare filet mignon, old-fashioned potato salad, six buttered rolls, fresh strawberries, shortcake and butter pecan ice cream. After entering the execution chamber, he gave two thumbs up to his brothers, who were attending, and calmly awaited the process to take place. His supposed last words were "May tomorrow see the courts shaped by more wisdom and less politics."

== Suspected murders ==
Aside from his three known killings, Wickline was considered a strong suspect in several other murders that involved dismemberment and were possibly drug-related. He has been publicly named as a suspect in the following murders:

- The 1978 disappearance of gambler Tory Gainer, who vanished from Fairfield County. Informants alleged that Wickline had killed and then scattered his remains around various dumpsters.
- The January 1983 murder of an unidentified man in Miami, Florida, whose remains were found floating in a canal. The medical examiner determined that the cuts were professionally done, akin to the way Wickline killed his victims, and supposed it might have been another contract killing.

It has since been determined that three other murders in which Wickline was suspected were committed by other people. The first murder was that of 15-year-old John A. Muncy, whose dismembered remains were found in Delaware County, in October 1983. At the time, investigators suspected that Muncy might have been a victim of chance, as he had gotten in the way of a drug transaction. In 2020, authorities identified Muncy's killer as Daniel Alan Anderson, a violent sex offender with past convictions for abusing young boys, who had died in 2013. The other two murders were that of Annette Cooper and Todd Schultz, for which Cooper's stepfather, Dale Johnston, was convicted and sentenced to death, but whose guilt was questioned, in 1984. In 1990, Johnston was acquitted on appeal and released from prison. In 2008, two other men confessed and were convicted of the crime and Johnston was formally exonerated.

== See also ==
- Capital punishment in Ohio
- Capital punishment in the United States
- List of murder convictions without a body
- List of people executed by lethal injection
- List of people executed in Ohio
- List of people executed in the United States in 2004
- List of serial killers in the United States

Executions carried out in Ohio
Preceded by John Roe February 3, 2004	William Wickline; March 30, 2004	Succeeded by William G. Zuern Jr. June 8, 2004
Executions carried out in the United States
Preceded by Lawrence Colwell Jr. – Nevada March 26, 2004	William Wickline – Ohio; March 30, 2004	Succeeded by Dennis Orbe – Virginia March 31, 2004
