= John Robinson (Medal of Honor) =

- U.S. Navy Medal of Honor
- Born: c. 1840; Cuba
- Military career
- Allegiance: United States
- Branch: United States Navy
- Rank: Captain of the Hold
- Unit: USS Yucca
- Awards: Medal of Honor

John Robinson (born c. 1840, date of death unknown) was a United States Navy sailor and a recipient of the United States military's highest decoration, the Medal of Honor.

A native of Cuba, Robinson joined the Navy from the U.S. state of Maine. By January 19, 1867, he was serving as captain of the hold on the USS Yucca. On that day, he and another man, Acting Ensign James H. Bunting, swam ashore during a storm in Pensacola Bay to aid their ship. For this action, Robinson was awarded the Medal of Honor a month later, on February 23.

Robinson's official Medal of Honor citation reads:

With Acting Ensign James H. Bunting, during the heavy gale which occurred in Pensacola Bay on the night of 19 January 1867, Robinson swam ashore with a line for the purpose of sending off a blowcock, which would facilitate getting up steam and prevent the vessel from stranding, thus voluntarily periling his life to save the vessel and the lives of others.

== See also ==
- List of Medal of Honor recipients during peacetime
