= Psittacism =

Repetitive manner of speech

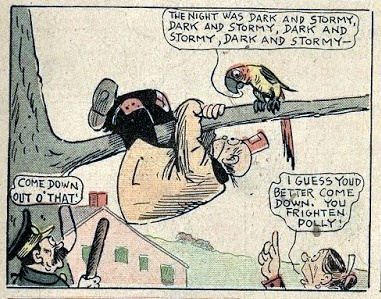
Psittacism refers to repetitive parrot-like speech

Psittacism is speech or writing that appears mechanical or repetitive in the manner of a parrot. More generally it is a pejorative description of the use of words which appear to have been used without regard to their meaning.

The word is derived from the Latin term for parrots psittaci – which in turn derives from the Greek ψιττακός – in an analogy with the ability of some parrots to speak human words but without any knowledge of their meaning. Parrots, in turn, may be used as symbols of psittacism. In Flaubert's story Un cœur simple the parrot may have been used in this manner. Ben Stoltzfus wrote in The French Review:

Thus, Loulou is a parrot, and at the same time a symbol of psittacism, that malady of so many of Flaubert's characters who either parrot banalities without thought or meaning, or are the victims of this psittacism.
