= John H. Robinson (Virginia politician, born 1857) =

American attorney, politician and educator

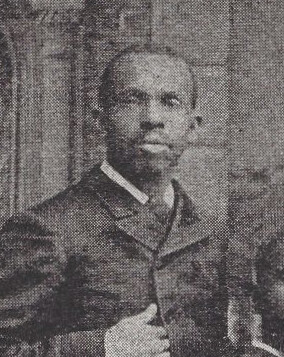
John H. Robinson, circa 1887

John H. Robinson, Sr. (1857 – December 6, 1932) was an American attorney, politician and educator. A Republican, he served in the Virginia House of Delegates from 1887 to 1888.

== Early life and education ==
Robinson born in 1857 in Gloucester County, Virginia.

He graduated from Hampton Institute (Hampton Normal and Agricultural Institute, now Hampton University) in 1876. After studying law, he was admitted to the bar in 1881.

== Career ==
Robinson was an educator for most of his career and taught school in Elizabeth City and surrounding counties. In 1890 he became Union Street colored school's first principal, located in Hampton and also practiced law.

After retiring from education in 1917, he was a lawyer and board member of The People's Savings and Loan Association and worked in life insurance.

=== Politician ===
A Republican, Robinson was active politics and was elected as secretary for the local Republican nominating committee in 1886. In 1887, he was elected to the Virginia House of Delegates representing Elizabeth City, James City, Warwick, and York counties and served one term from 1887 to 1888. He continued to have various roles within the Republican Party and was chairman of the Elizabeth City nominating committee in 1912.

== Personal life ==
Robinson was married and had 5 children. His son John H. Robinson, Jr., a doctor, died in 1927. Robinson, Sr. died of pneumonia at his home in Hampton on December 6, 1932.
