= John R. Robinson =

American accountant

John R. Robinson is an American accountant, currently the C. Aubrey Smith Professor in Accounting at the McCombs School of Business, University of Texas at Austin. From 2002 to 2005, he was the Editor of the American Taxation Association's Journal of the American Taxation Association.
