= John Robinson (New York politician) =

Politician in colonial New York, US (1654–1734)

John Robinson (1654-1734) was born in Huntington, New York. He served as a representative of Queens County in the 1691 New York Colonial Assembly to replace John Tredwell after he was arrested on a "scandalous" charge. He is the father of Captain Robert Robinson, one of the founders of Yaphank. John Robinson died in Oyster Bay, New York in 1734.
