= John Robinson (brewer) =

Sir John Edgar Robinson (20 March 1895 – 21 February 1978) was a British brewing executive and local politician.

== Early life and education ==
John Edgar Robinson was born on 20 March 1895, the son of William Robinson and his wife Priscilla, née Needham. He attended Stockport Grammar School, before studying at the University of Manchester, graduating with a Bachelor of Laws degree.

== Career ==
Robinson qualified as a solicitor in 1918, the same year he joined the family brewing business, Frederic Robinson Ltd. He remained with the company for the rest of his career, becoming its chairman in 1953. Outside of brewing, he was active in local politics, serving as Chairman of the Knutsford Division Conservative Association from 1949 to 1952, and then its Deputy President (until 1971) and President (from 1971 to 1975). He was President of the Stockport Chamber of Commerce, and was knighted in 1958 "for political and public services in Cheshire".

Robinson had married, in 1926, Gwendolen Harriet May, daughter of Sydney Herbert Evans, and they had three sons. He died on 21 February 1978, aged 82.
