= John William Byrd Jr. =

American convicted murderer who protested his innocence

- Mug shot of John William Byrd Jr.
- Born: December 18, 1963; Cincinnati, Ohio, U.S.
- Died: February 19, 2002 (aged 38); Southern Ohio Correctional Facility, Ohio, U.S.
- Status: Executed by lethal injection
- Convictions: Aggravated murder Aggravated robbery (2 counts); Abduction
- Penalty: Death (August 19, 1983)

John William Byrd Jr. (December 18, 1963 – February 19, 2002) was an American murderer who was executed by lethal injection for killing convenience store clerk Monte Tewksbury. Byrd, who protested his innocence until his execution, spent 18 years and 6 months on Ohio's death row. Byrd was the third person to be put to death since Ohio reintroduced the death penalty in 1981.

== Crimes ==
On the evening of April 17, 1983, Monte Tewksbury, 40, was working alone as the night clerk at a convenience store in Hamilton County, Ohio. Tewksbury, who was married and a father of three children, worked full-time for Procter & Gamble, and moonlighted at the store as a second job to help provide for his family.

At around 11 p.m., John Byrd and John Brewer entered the store in masks; Byrd carried a five-inch bowie knife. They stole $133.97 from the cash register and robbed Tewksbury of his Pulsar watch, wedding ring, and wallet which contained cash, credit cards, and an automobile registration slip. Then, as Tewksbury stood with his hands raised and his back to the robbers, Byrd drove the knife to the hilt into Tewksbury's side. It penetrated the liver and caused massive internal bleeding. The two robbers then ripped out the inside telephone from the wall and fled. At approximately 11:10 p.m., a witness driving by the store observed two men running to a large red van and driving off.

A short time after the assault and robbery at Tewksbury's store, a clerk at a different convenience store nearby was behind his cash register while a customer played a video game near the front door. Byrd and Brewer entered the store wearing masks. The clerk realized what was happening and fled to a room in the rear of the store. Byrd chased him with a knife and unsuccessfully tried to force open the door. Brewer tried to restrain the customer, who escaped.

The robbers were unable to open the cash register so they took it with them. A resident of a nearby apartment, disturbed by a loud engine, looked outside and saw Byrd and Brewer get into a large red van with a broken tail light parked in the lot.

Meanwhile, despite being severely injured, Tewksbury managed to exit the store and get to the outside telephone. He called his wife, Sharon, told her he had been robbed and stabbed, and that she should call the police and an ambulance. At the same time, a customer arrived at the store and found Tewksbury standing outside the building and leaning against the wall next to the telephone, bleeding from his side. The man helped Tewksbury back into store, went back to the telephone which was still off the hook, and spoke briefly with Sharon. He told her to call an ambulance while he summoned police. Tewksbury told the man, "I'm going to die", and that he had been robbed and stabbed with a knife. He described his assailants as two white men wearing stocking masks.

Sharon quickly arrived at the scene and held her dying husband in her arms as he repeated his statements. Tewksbury was transported to a hospital, and while en route, made statements to the effect that he did not understand why he had been stabbed, because he had been cooperative and had complied with the robbers' requests. Tewksbury's heart failed in the emergency room and he was pronounced dead at 1:15 the next morning.

== Arrests and investigation ==
As doctors were working to save Tewksbury's life at the hospital, two police officers from Forest Park in Hamilton County were seated in a marked police cruiser in a K-Mart parking lot eating their lunch. They had been advised approximately forty-five minutes earlier by their supervisor about the incident at Tewksbury's store. As the officers watched, a red cargo van drove by at a low speed. The van pulled into the K-Mart lot, and its headlights were turned off. A few minutes later, the van's headlights came back on, and the van left the lot. However, the van returned within five minutes.

The police officers became suspicious, and followed the van as it pulled into a parking lot near yet another convenience store. The officers pulled behind the van after summoning back-up assistance. One of the passengers, later identified as John Eastle Brewer, exited the van and approached the police car. Brewer identified himself as "David Urey" and told the police he had no identification.

Brewer provided inconsistent stories about why he was in the area. One of the officers asked Brewer to remain in the cruiser while he approached the van. The van's driver, William Danny Woodall, and Byrd provided the officer with identification, which was called in to the dispatcher. Although there were no current warrants for either man, the dispatcher reported that both had prior felony convictions. The officer shined a flashlight inside the van and saw coins on the floor. There were stocking masks and a knife located in a tray on the dashboard. A credit card in Sharon Tewksbury's name was lying on the floor under the passenger seat. There was also what appeared to be fresh blood on the interior side of the driver's seat. A drawer from a cash register was in the back of the van.

On the basis of this evidence, Byrd, Brewer, and Woodall were arrested. In an indictment returned on May 26, 1983, the three were charged with aggravated murder and three counts of aggravated robbery. Byrd also was charged with two death penalty specifications: That he was the "principal offender" who committed the aggravated murder of Monte Tewksbury while committing or attempting to commit the aggravated robbery of the convenience store, as well as the aggravated robbery of Monte Tewksbury himself.

The three were held at the Hamilton County Sheriff's Office. When Brewer was interviewed at 7:16 am on April 18, 1983, he stated that he and his friends, Byrd and Woodall, had borrowed the red van, that they were in sole possession of the van from the time they borrowed it until they were apprehended, that at no time during the interim did they have any other persons with them or let anyone out of the van, and that they and only they had been in the van while it was in their possession.

== Trials ==
Brewer and Woodall were separately tried and convicted of aggravated murder and three counts of aggravated robbery. They were both sentenced to life terms. Woodall died of cancer in prison on April 8, 2001.

John Brewer was tried in August 1983, and testified in his own defense. On direct examination, Brewer denied ever participating in the killing or injury of anyone, and he testified that the statement he gave to detectives was true to the best of his recollection.

He testified that he and his friends had pulled over because they suspected trouble with one of the tires on the van. He denied any knowledge of how Sharon Tewksbury's credit card ended up in the red van, and speculated that the loose change on the floor of the van had come from a cup of coins Woodall's young son liked to play with in the van. Brewer could not explain how the cash drawer from the second store came to be in the van, and he disputed that the Converse All-Stars shoe print on the counter at the murder site was from his own Converse All-Stars shoes. Brewer denied ever committing any crime of violence, and testified that he knew nothing about either of the robberies, and by extension, Tewksbury's murder.

Almost immediately upon commencement of cross-examination, Brewer refused to answer the prosecutor's questions. Brewer was instructed by the trial judge to answer the inquiries, but after denying ever being near the murder site the night of the killing, Brewer again refused to be cross-examined.

Byrd was tried as the principal offender, which under Ohio law means "the actual killer". Among the chief witnesses against him was another prisoner, Ronald Armstead, who claimed that Byrd had confessed to him. Prosecutors did not mention at trial that Armstead would win parole if he cooperated. However, Armstead's chance at parole was not a guarantee. Armstead was declared a parole violator before he testified and was returned to prison afterward. Because he was in danger in prison, the state notified the parole board. Armstead was represented by the state public defender when he sought release from his parole violation. The state public defender advised the parole board that Armstead should be released because of his cooperation and because he was in danger in prison. He was then released.

Byrd denied having anything to do with either the robbery or Tewksbury's death. He claimed he was passed out in the van from a day-long drinking binge. However, there was substantial circumstantial evidence pointing toward Byrd's guilt:

- blood on Byrd's pants;
- blood on the right side of the back of the driver's seat, where Byrd was crouching when the police pulled the van over;
- an absence of blood on Brewer's clothes;
- Byrd's possession of Tewksbury's watch;
- Byrd's behavior at the second robbery, where, armed with a knife, he attacked a door behind which the clerk had taken refuge.

Finally, the state argued that Brewer's shoe print on the counter showed that he retrieved the money while Byrd went after Tewksbury.

Byrd was found guilty of aggravated murder with death penalty specifications. The jury recommended capital punishment and he was sentenced to death on August 19, 1983.

== Byrd's appeal ==
Byrd's appeals were based heavily on statements made by Brewer after he was convicted and sentenced to at least 41 years in prison. In his direct appeal, Byrd claimed that he was "actually innocent" of the murder of Monte Tewksbury arguing that he was not the principal offender in Tewksbury's murder; instead, Brewer was the one who stabbed Tewksbury. Byrd supported his claim with two affidavits executed by Brewer on May 16, 1989, and January 24, 2001, respectively.

=== Brewer's affidavits ===
After being convicted and sentenced to prison, John Brewer was visited several times by Byrd's attorney at the time. One such visit, on May 16, 1989, nearly six years after his conviction, resulted in Brewer's executing an affidavit. The Ohio Public Defender's Office, which represented Byrd during his appeals, withheld the affidavits through much of the appellate process gambling that Byrd would eventually win a retrial. The affidavits from Brewer clearly place Byrd at the scene of the crime, a difficult fact to overcome in trial.

In fact, Brewer executed a total of five affidavits claiming that he killed Monte Tewksbury, but each contained a different version of the events that did not conform to the physical evidence at the scene of the crime or Tewksbury's dying declarations. The Public Defender introduced the first two, prompting the federal appellate court to stay Byrd's execution and order the evidentiary hearing. Two more were introduced during the week-long hearing by the defense and the last affidavit was produced by attorneys for the State of Ohio.

The defense strategy, however, was roundly criticized by the federal magistrate judge overseeing the hearing, who at one point wanted one of the public defenders to take the stand to explain why, if he had notarized the fifth affidavit, defense attorneys only acknowledged two of the documents. An attorney representing the public defender said if his client was ordered to take the stand, he would stand on his Fifth Amendment right against self-incrimination.

In the end, the affidavit controversy prompted the head of the Public Defender's office to request that he and several other lawyers in his office be allowed to step aside. The magistrate declined that motion, but the matter was referred to the Ohio Supreme Court's Disciplinary Counsel for possible ethics violations.

=== Other evidence ===
Attorneys for the state argued in court briefs that Brewer had nothing to lose by making the claim to help Byrd avoid execution, since Brewer himself could not be retried for the crime and sentenced to death.

Additionally, in the federal evidentiary hearing on Byrd's habeas corpus petition, the state presented evidence that Brewer repeatedly said Byrd was the actual killer. As part of the prison intake process, Brewer completed a form that included a place for the inmate to give his version of his offenses. There, Brewer stated he was "involved" in a killing and robberies, but denied any knowledge of the killing or any propensity for violence.

At the evidentiary hearing, Brewer denied ever saying that John Byrd was Tewksbury's actual killer. However, he was confronted with an intake screening form dated August 23, 1983, in which he stated "my buddy killed this guy..."

Despite the introduction of the intake psychologist's report, which stated that Brewer had said he was surprised when his buddy came out of the convenience store and announced that he had "wasted the dude", Brewer testified in federal court that he told the psychologist only that all three men had been convicted of aggravated murder and that Byrd was sentenced to death. Brewer suggested the psychologist's report may have been part of a conspiracy between the psychologist or prison authorities and the Hamilton County Prosecutor's Office.

Brewer acknowledged in court that he had lied to the original investigators after his arrest, and that he had also lied while under oath at his own trial.

The credibility of Brewer's claim was further undermined by the testimony regarding William Woodall's account of the crime. Woodall, considerably older than Byrd and Brewer, was the driver of red van during both robberies.

"This Court finds after reviewing the totality of Brewer's statements concerning the (Tewksbury) murder and the statements of others made about Brewer's statements, that Brewer's credibility is irreparably damaged", the U.S. District Court magistrate judge wrote in recommending a dismissal of Byrd's habeas corpus petition. "He admits to having lied to the court in his own trial, his prison social worker, a prison psychologist, the Department of Rehabilitation and Correction, and the Bureau of Classification and Reception. His five affidavits contain glaring inconsistencies and omissions, and he lied while under oath at the proceedings before this very Court. These facts allow no room for a conclusion other than that John Brewer's word is not to be believed."

The 6th Circuit endorsed the magistrate's 171-page report of the week-long evidentiary hearing and rejected the habeas claim.

Subsequent appeals to the state and federal appellate courts on a number of other issues and review by the United States Supreme Court were ultimately unsuccessful, although they did postpone the execution. On March 15, 1995, Byrd came within 45 minutes of execution before the Sixth Circuit Court of Appeals overruled Ohio Supreme Court's decision to allow the state to carry out the sentence. In all, Byrd's case was reviewed on appeal more than 10 times at the state level and a dozen times in federal courts. During his 18 years of appeals, Byrd's case was examined by more than 70 judges and Supreme Court justices.

== Execution ==
=== Clemency petition ===
On August 23, 2001, the Ohio Parole Board, by a vote of 10–1 rejected Byrd's request for a positive clemency recommendation and urged Governor Bob Taft not to grant executive clemency. The board rejected Byrd's innocence claim, finding that John Brewer's post-trial confession that he, and not Byrd, was Tewksbury's killer "lacks any credibility whatsoever".

Taft's decision was delayed by the last-minute habeas corpus decision and it would be seven months before he would weigh in on the issue. On February 16, 2002, Taft accepted the Board's recommendation and denied clemency.

Among those opposing the execution was Arthur M. Schlesinger Jr., a Columbus, Ohio native, special assistant to President John F. Kennedy and Pulitzer Prize-winning author. Schlesinger noted in his letter that he was "a friend half a century ago of (U.S.) Sen. Robert A. Taft," the governor's grandfather.

Capital punishment, Schlesinger wrote, "should be reserved for cases where there is absolutely no shred or tremor of doubt . . . The case of John Byrd is, to say the least, shrouded in doubt."

Ironically, Byrd's lengthy appeals process thwarted his wish to bring the graphic nature of the death penalty home to Ohioans. He originally had chosen to be executed in the electric chair because he said he had no desire to be "euthanized like a dog", but a court-ordered postponement of his scheduled execution in September 2001 allowed the Ohio General Assembly to pass a bill making lethal injection Ohio's sole means of execution.

=== Execution ===
Byrd stated:

What you are witnessing, for whosoever is here for this state-sanctioned murder, a cowardice way of hiding behind the state seal – you don't know what you're doing.

Nine minutes after the injection process began, Byrd was dead.

== See also ==
- Capital punishment in Ohio
- Capital punishment in the United States
- List of people executed in Ohio
- List of people executed in the United States in 2002

== General references ==
- Clark Prosecutor
- In re Byrd, United States Court Of Appeals For The Sixth Circuit, 297 F.3d 520; 2002 U.S. App. LEXIS 7746, March 29, 2002
- Byrd v. Bagley, United States Court Of Appeals For The Sixth Circuit, 37 Fed. Appx. 94; 2002
- Byrd v. Collins, United States Court Of Appeals For The Sixth Circuit, 209 F.3d 486; 2000
- Byrd v. Collins, United States District Court For The Southern District Of Ohio, Eastern Division, 1995 U.S. Dist. LEXIS 22323
- State v. Byrd, Supreme Court of Ohio, 32 Ohio St. 3d 79; 512 N.E.2d 611; 1987 Ohio LEXIS 349, August 12, 1987
- State v. Byrd, Court Of Appeals Of Ohio, First Appellate District, Hamilton County, 145 Ohio App. 3d 318
- 2005 Capital Crimes Report (pdf) Office of the Ohio Attorney General.

Executions carried out in Ohio
Preceded by Jay D. Scott June 14, 2001	John William Byrd Jr. February 19, 2002	Succeeded by Alton Coleman April 26, 2002
Executions carried out in the United States
Preceded by Michael Owsley – Missouri February 6, 2002	John William Byrd Jr. – Ohio; February 19, 2002	Succeeded by Monty Delk – Texas February 28, 2002
