= USS Jack C. Robinson =

Transport ship in United States Navy

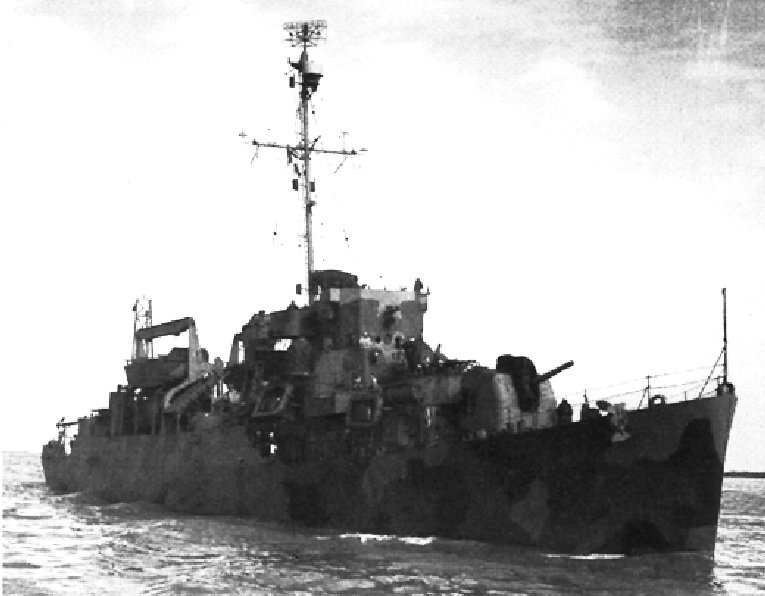
- USS Jack C. Robinson

History

United States
- Name: USS Jack C. Robinson
- Namesake: Private First Class Jack C. Robinson (1922–1942), U.S. Marine Corps Silver Star recipient
- Builder: Dravo Corporation, Pittsburgh, Pennsylvania; Consolidated Steel Corporation, Orange, Texas
- Launched: 8 January 1944
- Sponsored by: Mrs. Clem F. Robinson
- Reclassified: APD-72, 27 June 1944
- Commissioned: 2 February 1945
- Decommissioned: 13 December 1946
- Stricken: 1 December 1966
- Honors and awards: 1 battle star, World War II
- Fate: Transferred to Chile

History

Chile
- Name: Orella (APD-27)

General characteristics
- Class & type: Charles Lawrence-class high-speed transport
- Displacement: 1,400 long tons (1,422 t)
- Length: 306 ft (93 m) overall
- Beam: 36 ft 10 in (11.23 m)
- Draft: 13 ft 6 in (4.11 m) maximum
- Installed power: 12,000 shaft horsepower (9 megawatts)
- Propulsion: Two boilers; two GE steam turbines (turbo-electric transmission)
- Speed: 24 knots (44 km/h; 28 mph)
- Range: 6,000 nautical miles (11,000 km) at 12 knots (22 km/h; 14 mph)
- Troops: 162
- Complement: 186
- Armament: 1 × 5 in (130 mm) gun; 6 × 40 mm guns; 6 × 20 mm guns; 2 × depth charge tracks

USS Jack C. Robinson (APD-72), ex-DE-671, was a United States Navy high-speed transport in commission from 1945 to 1946.

Jack C. Robinson, the ship's namesake, was a marine killed during the Battle for Henderson Field in October 1942.

== Construction and commissioning ==
Jack C. Robinson was laid down as the Buckley-class destroyer escort USS Jack C. Robinson (DE-671) by the Dravo Corporation at Pittsburgh, Pennsylvania and launched as such on 8 January 1944, sponsored by Mrs. Clem F. Robinson, mother of the ship's namesake. The ship was reclassified as a Charles Lawrence-class high-speed transport and redesignated APD-72 on 27 June 1944, and was towed to Orange, Texas, for fitting out by the Consolidated Steel Corporation there. After conversion to her new role, the ship was commissioned at Orange on 2 February 1945.

== Service history ==
=== World War II ===
After shakedown in the Caribbean, Jack C. Robinson departed Norfolk, Virginia, on 31 March 1945 to join the United States Pacific Fleet for World War II service in the Pacific, arriving at San Diego, California, on 14 April 1945. On 24 April 1945 she arrived at Pearl Harbor, Territory of Hawaii, to begin a month of intensive training. Arriving at Ulithi Atoll on 21 May 1945, she took up duty as an escort vessel for the massive supply convoys between staging bases and the forward areas. In June 1945 she moved to Okinawa for antisubmarine patrol offshore in support of the Okinawa campaign, departing Okinawa on 17 July 1945 to take up similar duty in the Philippine Islands.

=== Postwar ===
After the surrender of Japan brought World War II to an end on 15 August 1945, Jack C. Robinson engaged in convoy duties supporting the Allied occupation of Japan and the former Japanese Empire before returning via the Panama Canal to Norfolk early in 1946.

After exercises in the Caribbean, Jack C. Robinson arrived at the New York Naval Shipyard at Brooklyn, New York, on 24 May 1946 for extensive repairs. She then was towed to Green Cove Springs, Florida, for inactivation, arriving there on 30 October 1946.

== Decommissioning and disposal ==
Jack C. Robinson was decommissioned at Green Cove Springs on 13 December 1946 and placed in the Florida Group of the Atlantic Reserve Fleet on the St. Johns River there. She later was moved to the Texas Group of the Atlantic Reserve Fleet at Orange, Texas.

After 20 years of inactivity in reserve, Jack C. Robinson was stricken from the Navy List on 1 December 1966.

== Chilean Navy service ==
Jack C. Robinson was sold to Chile under the Military Assistance Program. She served in the Chilean Navy as Orella (APD-27) until stricken and scrapped.

== Honors and awards ==
Jack C. Robinson received one battle star for her World War II service off Okinawa.
