= Jack Robinson (idiom) =

Name used in two figures of speech

Jack Robinson is a name present in two common figures of speech. When referring to Jack Robinson, it is used to represent quickness. In contrast, the phrase "(A)round Jack Robinson's barn" has the opposite connotation, implying slowness, as it is often used to refer to circumlocution, circumvention, or doing things in roundabout or unnecessarily complicated ways.

== Etymology and common variants ==
=== Connoting quickness ===
Multiple citations explain references to Jack Robinson as meaning quickness of thought or deed. The normal usage is, "(something is done) faster than you can say Jack Robinson", or otherwise, "before you can say Jack Robinson". The phrase can be traced back to the eighteenth century.

Examples

- The phrase first appeared in print in 1778 in Frances Burney's novel Evelina ("I'd do it as soon as say Jack Robinson"), but probably was in wide use before that time.
- According to Grose's Classical Dictionary (1785), the reference is to an individual whose social visits were so short that he would be departing almost before his arrival was announced.
- Supposedly, an English gentleman of the early nineteenth century named Jack Robinson was a person who changed his mind. A person had to be quick to catch him in a decision.
- Sir John (Jack) Robinson, the Constable of the Tower of London from 1660 to 1679, held at the same time a judiciary appointment in the nearby City of London, and could and did condemn a felon in the city, then have him transported to the Tower where he commanded the execution, with the entire process completed "faster than you can say Jack Robinson".
- John "Jack" Robinson (1727–1802) was Joint Secretary to the Treasury in England from 1770 to 1782 and regularly acted as a Government Whip, responsible for organising elections and political patronage. Of his reputation for political fixing, Nathaniel Wraxall wrote: "No man in the House ... knew so much of its original composition, the means by which every individual attained his seat, and, in many instances, how far and through what channels he might prove accessible." Therefore, fixing something "faster than you can say 'Jack Robinson'" was very fast indeed.
- Yet another story relates the origin of the phrase to a comic song of the 1840s, written and performed by Tom Hudson, which tells of a sailor who returns from a voyage to discover that his wife has married another sailor in his absence.
- In 1840, an article from the York Herald used the Jack Robinson idiom, saying, "A fox having been started, two hounds present, immediately gave chase, but reynard having gallantly turned upon his adversaries, they deemed it the safer plan to 'cut their sticks,; and yelped from the field before you could pronounce 'Jack Robinson.'"

Variants

The similar phrase, "Before you can say 'Knife!'", dates from at least 1850, when it appeared in Charles Dickens' Household Words.

In the late nineteenth century we have Sooner than ye'll say "Jock Hector!", He'll them describe or draw their picture.

=== Connoting slowness or roundaboutness ===
In contrast, the phrase "(A)round Jack Robinson's barn" has the opposite connotation, implying slowness, as it is often used to refer to circumlocution, circumvention, or doing things in roundabout or unnecessarily complicated ways. In response to an inquiry by Ken Greenwald (a forum moderator at WordWizard), Joan Houston Hall (Editor of the Dictionary of American Regional English (DARE) project at the University of Wisconsin at Madison) researched the term's etymology. Her findings are listed below, chronologically.

Examples

- "We [the senator-elect of Kansas] believe in the Government, which is simply the agent of the people, issuing their money directly to them without going AROUND ROBINSON'S BARN to find them". Chicago Daily Tribune. 30 January 1891. p. 4.
- "Don't go WAY ROUND ROBINSON'S BARN trying to tell it". Dialect Notes. Vol. 3. U.S. 1909. p. 415.
- More, Rev. John. "Psycho-Analysis and the Ministry". The Homiletic Review. Vol. LXXXIII, no. 1 January 1922. New Haven, Connecticut: Funk & Wagnall's. p. 18. "The closest mouthed person, who seldom is given to talking about himself, will yet manoeuver in devious ways, will travel all AROUND JACK ROBINSON'S BARN, and will pull strings of all sorts, to get his name in the paper, or to inspire the editor to say of him what he would rather bite his tongue off than say himself."
- "We went AROUND ROBINSON'S BARN to get you out of there and over here? They either tailed you, as we did, or they tailed me". Analog Science Fiction / Science Fact. U.S. 1930. p. 24.
- "He [head of the State Department of Public works] criticized the State's method of check and double-check in the construction of any, saying it was 'RUNNING AROUND ROBINSON'S BARN to get something done.'". The New York Times. U.S. 26 October 1932. p. 33.
- "... the Englishman [writer], quite properly, I think, may reply that after the American has fussed and frittered all the way AROUND ROBINSON'S BARN he usually, if he is a good writer, comes very close to the place from which the Englishman never left". The Washington Post. U.S. 17 December 1933. p. SM11.
- Beck, Samuel Jacob (1944). "Upset and going ALL AROUND ROBINSONS BARN before finally getting to anger because of last week's cancellation". Rorschach's Test. U.S. p. 143.
- "Will you please elucidate? But do not GO ALL THE WAY AROUND ROBINSON'S BARN, as I have noticed you are sometimes inclined to do". Courier-Journal. Louisville, Kentucky. 4 January 1951. p. Section 2.
- "Stop Meandering Deliveries . . . Money Down the Drain. Route your trucks the shortest way every trip. The time and gas used by your drivers looking for unknown streets, driving ALL AROUND ROBINSON'S BARN to make deliveries, will buy you a hundred maps like Hearne's Street Map of your city and county area". The Washington Post. U.S. 18 November 1952. p. 2. Advertisement.
- Johnston, Faith (1975). "What was the use of 'beating around the bush' or of 'going AROUND JACK ROBINSON'S BARN?'". Anchor Post. U.S. p. 197.
- ". . . from basic principles. He didn't believe in 'going a long way AROUND ROBINSON'S BARN'! Unfortunately, however, for students . ". American Journal of Medical Genetics. Vol. 18, no. 4, Special Issue: The Meckel Symposium. U.S. 1984. pp. 621–641.
- Carroll, Lenore (1989). "Annie Chambers". U.S. p. "The eponymous Annie's life is the story of prostitution in Chicago and Kansas City from 1859 to 1933. "'... keeping, permitting and maintaining a nuisance on said above described premises' and so on and so on three different ways AROUND JACK ROBINSON'S BARN . . ."
- National Board of Review of Motion Pictures (1997). ". . . but it [the film] wandered ALL AROUND ROBINSON'S BARN and even devoted footage to inept allusions to medieval scholarship". Films in Review. U.S. p. 251.
- "Hook up the DVD - and couldn't get it to work - to make a long story short, we had to go AROUND JACK ROBINSON'S BARN to find the solution - I don't know why this equipment can't be more user friendly". U.S. 23 September 2006.

Hall also found numerous references to a more common variant, "Robin Hood's barn", which she noted can be found in the Dictionary of American Regional English, Vol. 4, page 608.
