= Stacey Humphreys =

American convicted murderer (born 1973)

- Mugshot of Humphreys, c. 2025
- Born: Stacey Ian Humphreys; May 8, 1973 (age 53); Georgia, U.S.
- Status: Incarcerated on death row
- Motive: Robbery
- Convictions: Malice murder Felony murder Aggravated assault (2 counts); Kidnapping (2 counts); Armed robbery (2 counts); Possession of a firearm by a convicted felon (September 26, 2007)
- Penalty: Death (September 30, 2007)

Details
- Victims: Cyndi Williams, 33; Lori Brown, 21
- Date: November 3, 2003
- Location: Powder Springs, Georgia
- Imprisoned at: Georgia Diagnostic and Classification State Prison

Stacey Ian Humphreys (born May 8, 1973) is an American convicted double murderer sentenced to death in the U.S. state of Georgia. On November 3, 2003, Humphreys, who was on parole for a 1993 felony theft conviction, attacked 33-year-old Cyndi Williams and 21-year-old Lori Brown at a business in Powder Springs, Georgia, forcing them to undress before he shot them. Humphreys was found guilty of malice murder on both counts and sentenced to death in 2007.

== Background ==
Humphreys's criminal history began in October 1993, when he pleaded guilty to burglary, car theft, and forgery, connected to his breaking into a car and stealing a different car; he received a 10-year prison sentence for those crimes and was ordered to serve three years in custody, with the other seven to be served on supervised probation. In March 1997, Humphreys violated probation by impersonating a police officer at a mall in Kennesaw, Georgia, leading to the revocation of his parole and his return to prison to serve the rest of his sentence. In 1998, the Georgia Pardon and Parole Board voted for Humphreys to be released in October 2002, fifteen months before the end of his sentence, on conditional release.

Upon his scheduled release in October 2002, Humphreys moved in with his grandmother; his parole was scheduled to end in January 2004. The state Board of Pardons and Paroles spokesperson, Heather Hedrick, stated that Humphreys was classed as "a property crime offender with no history of any sort of assault or violence in his past at all".

During his trial in 2007, Humphreys's defense attorneys stated that Humphreys had survived child abuse. During the sentencing phase of his death penalty trial, Humphreys's sister testified that their father used to beat Humphreys with his fists and would hit her with belts and sticks. At the age of 3, Humphreys experienced a skull fracture; throughout his childhood, he was observed to have cigarette burns on his body.

A clinical psychologist who testified to Humphreys's mental state during the sentencing phase of his trial in September 2007 also stated that Humphreys's father would sit atop his body and beat him in the head as a child, although Humphreys had no memory of those attacks. The same psychologist said he believed Humphreys exhibited symptoms of post-traumatic stress disorder (PTSD), autism, and a dissociative disorder with "lapses of awareness", the latter exemplified by a time Humphreys drove "all the way to New Mexico" without any awareness of what he was doing; a different psychologist supported the first psychologist's findings of PTSD.

== Murders ==
On November 3, 2003, Humphreys committed the murders of two real estate agents in Powder Springs, Georgia. Humphreys, who was released 13 months prior on parole for a 1993 felony theft conviction, walked into a home construction company's sales office while armed with a gun. At that time, two real estate agents, 33-year-old Cynthia "Cyndi" Williams and 21-year-old Lori Brown, were working in the office. Humphreys confronted the women at gunpoint, forcing them to give up the access codes of their bank cards and to undress. Humphreys would first choke Williams with her underwear tied around her neck, before he made her lie down on her hands and knees, and he shot her to death, firing one shot each to her head and back.

After murdering Williams, Humphreys also killed Brown, forcing her to kneel with her head facing the floor before he shot her execution-style. After the fatal shootings, Humphreys stole the women's driver's licenses and ATM and credit cards, and he also withdrew more than $3,000 from their accounts. After Humphreys left the office at around 1:30 pm, a builder operating a nearby office found the bodies and called the police. An autopsy report showed that one of the bullets went through Williams's lung and heart from her back, while another had penetrated her head. Brown died from a single gunshot wound to her head, and she also had some hemorrhaging in her throat, suggesting she was likely choked or held in a headlock before the shooting.

== Arrest and murder charges ==
Humphreys was later identified as a suspect behind the murders, and he was placed on the wanted list, after a co-worker confirmed that the description of the suspect and his vehicle matched those of Humphreys and his vehicle. Police managed to schedule a meeting between Humphreys and his parole officer on the morning of November 7, 2003; however, Humphreys did not attend the meeting and went into hiding from the authorities.

On November 8, 2003, five days after the murders, Humphreys was arrested in Hartford, Wisconsin, where he was pursued by police after deputies recognized him and his vehicle which matched the description provided by Georgia state authorities.

Through their investigation, police managed to match the 9 mm bullets found on the women to a Ruger handgun that they recovered from Humphreys's rented Jeep. The police also found bloodstains on Humphreys's gun and truck, and forensic tests matched the blood on the gun to Williams' DNA, and Brown's DNA was matched to the blood on the truck.

== Trial and sentencing ==
By April 2004, the prosecution intended to seek the death penalty for Stacey Humphreys. Before the trial was to begin, the trial venue was changed from Cobb County to Glynn County due to pretrial publicity.

On September 18, 2007, the trial of Humphreys began before a Glynn County jury. During the trial, the prosecution (led by Cobb County Assistant District Attorney Marc Cella) said that robbery was the motive for the murders, given that Humphreys confessed to spending $565 of the victims' money on his Dodge Durango, and at the time of his arrest, the police found about $800 in cash in Humphreys's possession. Jimmy Berry, Humphreys's lawyer, conceded that his client indeed confessed to the murders, but he stated that Humphreys could not remember his whereabouts or actions on the date of the double murder, saying that his client suffered from bouts of memory lapses.

On September 26, 2007, the jury found Humphreys guilty of murder, felony murder, aggravated assault, kidnapping, and armed robbery. Shortly after the verdict, the jury began to deliberate on whether to sentence Humphreys to life in prison without the possibility of parole or the death penalty. Under Georgia state law, offenders could only receive a death sentence by unanimous vote; a split vote would result in life imprisonment.

The prosecution sought the death penalty, stating that Humphreys had committed the murders to get money and resolve his car payment, while the defense asked for mercy, stating that Humphreys was diagnosed with Asperger syndrome and planned to use the defense of diminished responsibility to argue against the death sentence. During the sentencing hearing, the friends and family members of the victims were allowed to testify in court. Out of all these witnesses, Williams's husband told the jurors that he was still "functionally depressed" by the murder of his wife, and it affected him so much that he considered resigning from his job and moving. In general, the victims' friends and families spoke about their grief over losing Williams and Brown and the murders' impacts on their respective lives.

On September 30, 2007, the jury returned a verdict, unanimously recommending the death penalty for Humphreys, and he was thus sentenced to death. According to Liliana Segura of The Intercept, originally, eleven of the jurors had voted for life without parole with only one juror, Linda Chancey, supporting the death penalty. However, after additional deliberation, the jury voted unanimously in favor of death. Following the trial, Humphreys's legal team interviewed the foreperson who later testified in court that Chancey had announced her intentions prior to Humphrey's conviction. The foreperson testified that Chancey had edited a note to the judge, about how they were unable to come to a unanimous vote, to include the word "currently," leading to an order to continue deliberations. During the continued deliberation, Chauncey became "hostile," throwing pictures of the victims at the other jurors and revealing that during voir dire she had not disclosed her past as an attempted armed robbery victim. Ultimately, due to unclear instructions from the judge, and false impressions, the jury capitulated and voted unanimously for the death penalty.

After the verdict was passed, Cobb County District Attorney Pat Head expressed that the death penalty was an appropriate punishment for Humphreys due to the brutality of the killings, and stated that Humphreys "took away all their humanity".

Humphreys was reportedly expressionless and silent when the death sentence was meted out, and in response, the families of Brown and Williams cried and embraced quietly at the time of the ruling, and Brown's father stated that he agreed with the death sentence, stating a terrible crime should end with a harsh penalty. Williams's sister stated she received some relief with the jury's verdict, even though the grief of their family would not disappear.

On October 8, 2007, Humphreys filed a motion for a new trial which the trial court denied on February 19, 2009.

== Appeals ==
The Georgia Supreme Court affirmed Humphreys’ convictions and death sentences on March 15, 2010. Humphreys filed a petition for writ of certiorari in the United States Supreme Court, which was denied on November 15, 2010.

In 2011, Humphreys filed an application for writ of habeas corpus in the Superior Court of Butts County. It was denied on March 10, 2016. The decision was appealed to the Georgia Supreme Court in the form of an application for certificate of probable cause. The application to appeal was denied on August 18, 2017. Humphreys’ petition for writ of certiorari was denied by the United States Supreme Court on April 16, 2018. Humphreys v. Sellers, 584 U.S. 935 (2018).

On May 24, 2018, Humphreys filed a writ of habeas corpus in the United States District Court for the Northern District of Georgia which was denied by the court on September 16, 2020. On February 4, 2021, Humphreys appealed to the United States Court of Appeals for the Eleventh Circuit. On June 11, 2024, the Eleventh Circuit affirmed the lower court’s decision.

On October 14, 2025, the U.S. Supreme Court denied Humphreys's final appeal.

Earlier in his appeals, Humphreys's counsel submitted that "extreme juror misconduct" had breached their client's right to an impartial jury and trial. Prior to Humphreys's sentencing, one of the female jurors insisted on imposing the death penalty even though the other 11 jurors were in favor of life imprisonment without parole. The one holdout juror had communicated to the court during jury selection that an unnamed escaped convict had committed armed robbery and attempted rape against her but that she had been able to escape the attack before he fully entered her home and that, despite her traumatic experience, she would be able to adjudge Humphreys's case fairly. However, during Humphreys's sentencing phase, she revealed to the jurors that the escaped convict had in actuality removed her clothes and assaulted her in her bed, and she communicated to her fellow jurors that she would not consider a life sentence for Humphreys and "had her mind made up" with regards to Humphreys receiving a death sentence.

Other jurors submitted affidavits after the trial's conclusion attesting that the holdout juror "scream[ed,]" "curs[ed]", and "vowed to stay there as long as it took to reach a death sentence," and jurors told the judge they were deadlocked; the jury foreperson asked to be removed from the case due to the holdout juror's "hostile" behavior", and jurors cited the holdout's behavior as making them feel "intimidated," but the judge instructed the jury to continue deliberating.

In their first two submitted deliberations, all jurors with the exception of the holdout voted for life without parole; on their final vote, the jury submitted a unanimous vote of death for Humphreys. In his appeals, Humphreys's claims of juror misconduct were rejected due to Georgia abiding by a "no-impeachment" rule that precludes post-trial testimonies and affidavits from jurors from being admissible evidence to overturn a trial verdict. With reference to Humphreys's claims of juror misconduct, Justice Sonia Sotomayor wrote in her dissenting opinion that this was a "single juror's extraordinary misconduct" that tainted the basis of Humphreys's death sentence. Nevertheless, the majority rejected Humphreys's arguments and dismissed his appeal.

== Death warrants ==
=== 2025 death warrant ===
On December 3, 2025, Humphreys's death warrant was signed by Cobb County Superior Court Chief Judge Ann B. Harris, and his death sentence was set to be carried out on December 17, 2025. Humphreys was the first death row inmate scheduled to be executed in Georgia in 2025. The state resumed executions in March 2024, when Willie Pye was executed for his ex-girlfriend's murder following a four-year moratorium due to the COVID-19 pandemic in the United States. As with all of Georgia's lethal injection executions, Humphreys was to be put to death with a single-drug injection of the short-acting barbiturate pentobarbital.

Humphreys's lawyers filed a last-minute appeal to stay his execution. The defense argued that Humphreys should not be executed and he was entitled for legal protection under a COVID-19 agreement, which was made during the state's judicial emergency in midst of the COVID-19 pandemic. The agreement stated that any inmates who lost their appeals for rehearing to the 11th Circuit Court of Appeals would not be executed until certain conditions (such as access to COVID-19 vaccinations and visitation rights) were fulfilled. However, as the emergency ended in June 2021 and Humphreys himself exhausted his appeals in 2025, he was not among the inmates covered by the agreement. The defense argued that this agreement could create a "distinct, disfavored class" of prisoners not granted equal protection and rights due to it protecting a certain group of condemned inmates, but the prosecution rebutted that Humphreys's rights were not violated and pointed out that similar arguments were made by another condemned inmate Willie Pye before his execution in 2024.

On December 11, 2025, U.S. District Court Judge Leigh Martin May denied Humphreys's appeal to stay his execution. A clemency hearing was scheduled for December 16, 2025, the eve of Humphreys's upcoming execution. During the week before his scheduled execution, Humphreys was allowed to request a special last meal in advance. According to the Georgia Department of Corrections, Humphreys ordered barbecue beef brisket, pork ribs, a bacon double cheeseburger, French fries, coleslaw, cornbread, buffalo wings, meat lovers pan pizza, vanilla ice cream, and two lemon-lime sodas.

On December 15, 2025, the Georgia State Board of Pardons and Paroles released an order suspending Humphreys's execution and postponing his clemency hearing "until further notice," amid allegations by the defendant's lawyers of conflicts of interest against two of the board's members.

=== 2026 death warrant ===
On March 4, 2026, Humphreys's stay of execution was lifted. On August 27, 2026, Humphreys's execution was re-scheduled to be carried out on September 16, 2026. A week prior to his scheduled execution, Humphreys was allowed to order his last meal in advance: barbecue beef brisket, pork ribs, a bacon double cheeseburger, buffalo wings, a meat lovers pan pizza, butter pecan ice cream, peach ice cream and two caffeine-free sodas.

On September 9, 2026, Humphreys appealed to the Cobb County Superior Court and requested to have a new sentencing trial, stating that there was a dishonest juror (Linda Chancey) who improperly manipulated the jury's results to decide on a death sentence. A day later, on September 10, 2026, the appeal was denied by a Cobb County judge. On September 11, 2026, his attorney's filed a motion for a clemency hearing to appeal the Cobb County judge's decision and reduce his sentence under the Georgia Survivor Justice Act passed the previous year. The hearing before the State Board of Pardons and Paroles began on September 15, at 9 A.M. EST; it was declined around 5 P.M. EST following a 3 to 5 vote with the Supreme Court of Georgia denying to review the case. Additionally, Humphreys's attorneys have argued that if he were to be executed by lethal injection, he should be either standing up or sitting as if he were laid flat on his back, he could struggle to breathe, resulting in a "torturous and grotesque spectacle."

On the same day of the clemency denial, Judge Tyler J. Browning stayed his execution in order to have a hearing regarding the Survivor Justice Act. Browning stated that if an appellate court ruling opposed Humphreys's entitlement to a hearing prior to the scheduled execution time, he would consider lifting the stay so that the execution could commence. State prosecutors filed an appeal soon after with one of the Attorney General’s office's lawyers, Sabrina Graham, stating, "There’s nothing in the statute that says that it applies to death row inmates. There’s nothing in the statute that even remotely suggests that." Around 6 P.M. EST, Humphreys's stay was upheld by the Georgia Supreme Court.

As of 2026, Humphreys remains on death row at the Georgia Diagnostic and Classification State Prison.

== Aftermath ==
In April 2004, a scholarship, Lori Brown Memorial Scholarship, was set up in memory of Brown, one of the real estate agents murdered by Stacey Humphreys. A high school graduate, who was set to major in business in Kennesaw State University, was awarded the scholarship that same month.

In April 2023, a true crime documentary series, titled The Real Murders of Atlanta, re-enacted the murders of Cyndi Williams and Lori Brown, and first aired through American television network Oxygen.

== See also ==
- Capital punishment in Georgia (U.S. state)
- List of death row inmates in the United States § Georgia
- List of people scheduled to be executed in the United States
