= Andrew DeYoung =

Andrew DeYoung may refer to:

- Andrew Grant DeYoung, American murderer
- Andrew DeYoung (director), American director, screenwriter, and producer
