= Donnie Cleveland Lance =

American murderer (1953–2020)

- Born: December 23, 1953
- Died: January 29, 2020 (aged 66); Georgia Diagnostic and Classification State Prison, Georgia, U.S.
- Status: Executed by lethal injection
- Motive: resentment for losing domestically abusive relationship with ex-wife
- Conviction: Murder (2 counts)
- Penalty: Death (June 23, 1999)

Details
- Victims: 2
- Date: November 8–9, 1997

Donnie Cleveland Lance (December 23, 1953 – January 29, 2020) was an American convicted murderer who was executed by the state of Georgia on January 29, 2020. He was convicted of killing his ex-wife, Sabrina Lance, and her boyfriend, Dwight Wood Jr.

== Murders ==
The murders of Sabrina Lance, 39, and Dwight Wood, 33, occurred shortly before midnight on November 8, 1997. Lance arrived at Wood's home and kicked in the front door. He then shot Wood in the front and back with a shotgun. Afterward, he beat Sabrina Lance to death with the same shotgun. Lance had a history of abusing Sabrina, including strangling her, beating her, and threatening to kill her. He once attempted to strangle her and also tried to electrocute her with a car battery.

== Sentencing ==
Lance was sentenced to death by lethal injection on June 23, 1999, for the murders of his ex-wife and her boyfriend.

== Execution ==
On January 17, 2020, an execution date was set between January 29, 2020, and February 5, 2020. It was then scheduled for January 29, 2020, at 7:00 P.M (EST). He was pronounced dead at 9:05 P.M (EST). Lance declined to make a final statement and said "no" when asked if he wanted a final prayer. His last meal consisted of two chili steak burgers, French fries, onion rings, mustard, ketchup, and a soda.

== See also ==
- List of people executed in Georgia (U.S. state)
- List of people executed in the United States in 2020

Executions carried out in Georgia
Preceded by Ray Jefferson Cromartie November 13, 2019	Donnie Cleveland Lance; January 29, 2020	Succeeded by Willie Pye March 20, 2024
Executions carried out in the United States
Preceded by John Steven Gardner – Texas January 15, 2020	Donnie Cleveland Lance – Georgia; January 29, 2020	Succeeded by Abel Revill Ochoa – Texas February 6, 2020
