= Andrew Grant DeYoung =

American murderer (1974–2011)

- Born: May 12, 1974; Alameda County, California, U.S.
- Died: July 21, 2011 (aged 37); Georgia Diagnostic and Classification State Prison, Jackson, Georgia, U.S
- Cause of death: Execution by lethal injection
- Known for: His execution was caught on videotape
- Status: Executed
- Conviction: Malice murder (3 counts)
- Penalty: Death

Details
- Victims: Gary DeYoung, 42; Kathryn DeYoung, 41; Sarah DeYoung, 14
- Date: June 14, 1993

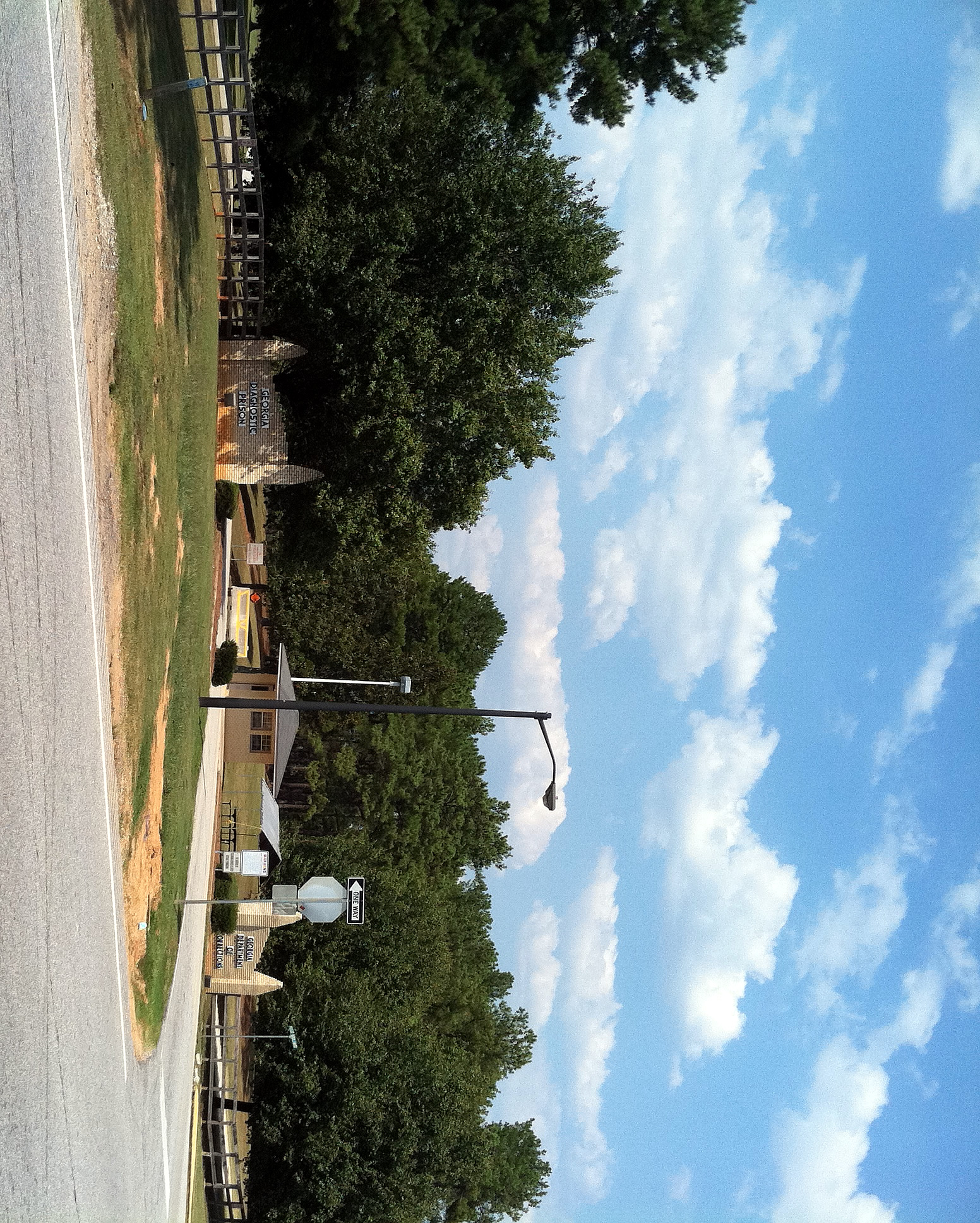
Georgia Diagnostic and Classification State Prison, where DeYoung was held on death row and where he was executed

Andrew Grant DeYoung (May 12, 1974 – July 21, 2011) was an American who was convicted of and executed for the 1993 murder of his parents and sister in the state of Georgia. The state conducted the execution in H-5 of the Georgia Diagnostic and Classification State Prison (GDCP) in Jackson, Georgia. DeYoung was 19 when he committed the murders and 37 when he was executed.

He was notable for having his execution videotaped. His lawyers had gained judicial permission for this to gain evidence as to "whether lethal injection caused unnecessary suffering."

== Murders and trial ==
On June 14, 1993 (33 years ago), the 19-year-old DeYoung repeatedly stabbed his mother, Kathryn, while she was sleeping. Awakened by her screams, his father Gary DeYoung struggled with Andrew before also being killed. Andrew DeYoung fatally stabbed his 14-year-old sister Sarah in the hallway outside their parents' bedroom. He had assigned an accomplice, David Michael Hagerty, to kill his 16-year-old brother, but the boy escaped through a bedroom window and ran to a neighbor's house for help.

On October 13, 1995, Andrew DeYoung was convicted by a jury of the murders of his parents, Gary and Kathryn DeYoung, and of his sister, Sarah. According to the prosecution, DeYoung killed his family in order to collect an inheritance from their estate, which he had estimated to be worth approximately US$480,000 (equivalent to $1,070,000 in 2025).

== Videotaping of execution ==
DeYoung was the first person in 19 years in the United States to have the execution videotaped and the first in which execution by lethal injection was recorded. The previous videotaped execution had been the gas chamber execution of Robert Alton Harris that took place in California on April 21, 1992. Other states are now considering videotaping executions. There is open discussion concerning whether or not making executions public would sway people to be more for or more against the death penalty.

== See also ==
- Capital punishment in Georgia (U.S. state)
- Capital punishment in the United States
- List of people executed in Georgia (U.S. state)
- List of people executed in the United States in 2011

Executions carried out in Georgia
Preceded by Roy Willard Blankenship June 23, 2011	Andrew Grant DeYoung; July 21, 2011	Succeeded by Troy Anthony Davis September 21, 2011
Executions carried out in the United States
Preceded by Mark Anthony Stroman – Texas July 20, 2011	Andrew Grant DeYoung – Georgia; July 21, 2011	Succeeded by Robert W. Jackson III – Delaware July 29, 2011
