= Jack Alderman =

American criminal (1951–2008)

Jack E. Alderman
- Born: May 29, 1951; Garden City, Georgia, U.S.
- Died: September 16, 2008 (aged 57); Georgia Diagnostic and Classification State Prison, Georgia, U.S.
- Status: Executed by lethal injection
- Convictions: Murder (June 14, 1975 & March 1984)
- Penalty: Death (June 1975 & April 1, 1985)

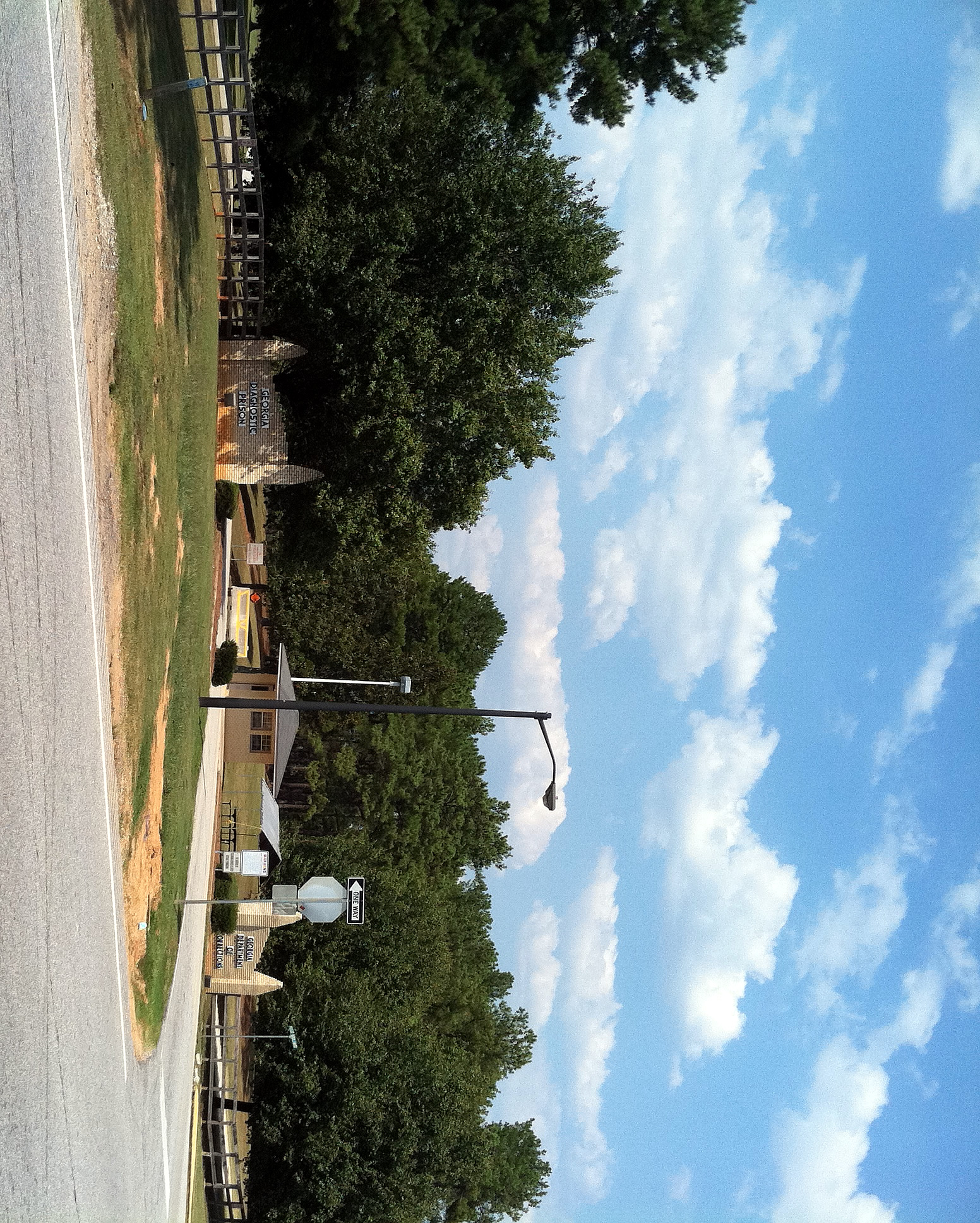
Georgia Diagnostic and Classification State Prison, where Alderman was held on death row and where he was executed

Jack Edward Alderman (May 29, 1951 – September 16, 2008) was, at the time of his execution, the longest-serving death row prisoner in the United States who has been executed. He had remained on death row for over 33 years.

== History ==
Jack Alderman was born on May 29, 1951, in Garden City, Georgia.

On June 14, 1975, he was convicted for the September 21, 1974, murder of his wife, Barbara Jean Alderman (née Blase), and was subsequently sentenced to death by the Superior Court of Chatham County, Georgia. His wife was beaten to death with a crescent wrench and choked before being dumped into a creek in Rincon, near her mother's home.

On April 1, 1985, at a new sentencing trial, he was again sentenced to die.

A Timesonline article states: "Alderman's co-defendant, John Brown, a drug addict and alcoholic, confessed to the murder, but then changed his story to implicate Alderman. Brown claimed that he and Alderman killed Mrs Alderman together, and that Alderman promised to pay him for his role in the killing. There was no forensic evidence and Alderman was convicted only as a result of statements provided by Brown." Brown was sentenced to life in prison for his role in the murder and paroled in 1987. In 2000, he committed suicide in 2000 when the police tried to arrest him on child molestation charges.

The prosecutors, however, maintained that Jack Alderman attempted to defraud $20,000 from his wife's life insurance, which was provided for by Barbara's employer, the City of Savannah.

Marcel Berlins of The Guardian wrote: "Alderman had claimed from the start he was innocent, even refusing to enter into plea bargains that would have spared his life, because that would have meant admitting his culpability".

Alderman was held at the Georgia Diagnostic and Classification Prison in Jackson, Georgia.

== Constitutionality of lethal injection ==
On October 19, 2007, an execution date for Jack Alderman, there was a temporary stay while the Supreme Court decided on the constitutionality of lethal injection.

== Legal action and campaigning ==
The Law Society, the Bar Council and the charity Reprieve, all organizations in Europe, called on the United Kingdom's then Foreign Secretary to use diplomatic channels to stay the execution of American convict Alderman and end what they called the "gross injustice of 34 years". They also sent letters to the Governor and Attorney-General of Georgia and its Board of Pardons and Paroles. Alderman was represented free-of-charge by the London law firm Clifford Chance.

== Execution ==
He was executed by lethal injection by the US State of Georgia on September 16, 2008.

Jack Alderman was pronounced dead at 7:25 p.m. EDT at the Georgia Diagnostic and Classification State Prison.

== See also ==
- Capital punishment in Georgia (U.S. state)
- Capital punishment in the United States
- List of people executed in Georgia (U.S. state)
- List of people executed in the United States in 2008

| Preceded by Michael Anthony Rodriguez | People executed in US after Baze v. Rees ruling | Succeeded by William Alfred Murray |
