= Murder of Susana Morales =

American kidnapping and murder case in Georgia (2022)

- Location: Gwinnett County, Georgia, U.S.
- Date: July 26, 2022, 10:00 pm – July 27, 2022, 2:00 am
- Attack type: Kidnapping, child murder by unknown means
- Victims: Susana Morales, 16
- Perpetrator: Miles Bryant
- Motive: Unknown (Note: In a pre-trial evidentiary hearing and a warrant application, prosecutors and investigators presented evidence that Bryant's motive may have been to commit sexual assault or to satiate sexual desires due to his history of alleged sexual misconduct towards multiple women prior and subsequent to Morales' murder; investigators stated in their warrant application that they believe Morales may have been raped. At trial, Bryant was acquitted of attempted rape.)
- Verdict: Guilty of murder, kidnapping, false report of a crime; acquitted of attempted rape
- Sentence: Life imprisonment without parole, plus 12 months

Susana Morales (June 24, 2006 – c. July 26, 2022) was a 16-year-old girl from Gwinnett County, Georgia, who was the victim of a kidnapping and homicide on the night of July 26, 2022, when she was abducted while walking home from a friend's house. She was initially reported as a missing person, and police approached her case as if she were a juvenile runaway. In February 2023, over six months after her disappearance, a man discovered her body in a wooded area near Dacula, Georgia, more than 20 miles from the location where the abduction took place. Police theorized that Morales' murderer killed her within, at most, four hours of abducting her.

When authorities investigated the location where Morales' body was left, they could not determine a cause of death for Morales, but they found an undischarged pistol nearby that was registered to Miles Bryant, then a 22-year-old police officer working for the Doraville, Georgia, police department; Bryant had reported the gun as stolen the day after Morales' abduction and murder. Upon looking into Bryant's history, Gwinnett County officials confirmed that on the night of and the morning after the murder, Bryant had visited the scene where Morales' body was later located. Gwinnett County officials subsequently interrogated him and then placed him in custody, initially charging him only with concealment of a corpse and false report of a crime due to Bryant's disproven assertion that his gun was stolen. Later, his charges were upgraded to murder, kidnapping, and attempted rape. In June 2024, Bryant was convicted of malice murder, felony murder, kidnapping, and false report of a crime, while he was acquitted of attempted rape. Bryant was sentenced to life imprisonment without parole. As of May 2026, Bryant is appealing his conviction and sentence.

== Background ==
=== Susana Morales ===
Susana Morales was originally from Norcross, Georgia. Morales was her mother's youngest child. Her mother said that she had aspirations of being a detective, and her family said she was a singer who was artistically and musically inclined. She was a student at Meadowcreek High School.

=== Miles Bryant ===
Before becoming a police officer in Doraville, Georgia, Miles Bryant served in the Army National Guard. When not on duty, he worked as a "courtesy officer" at the Sterling Glen Apartments in Norcross, where he lived. The apartment complex was also Morales' last known location. As a courtesy officer, Bryant's job was to patrol the area. In 2020, Bryant worked as a jailer in Forsyth County, Georgia; from March 2020 to May 2021, Bryant was a sworn sheriff's deputy in Forsyth County. In 2021, after undergoing an extensive background check, he became a Doraville police officer, a position he held until he was arrested in Morales' case. Bryant expressed on at least one occasion that he aspired to eventually join the Gwinnett County Police Department. A performance review by one of Bryant's supervisors completed of Bryant before the murder stated that other officers liked Bryant and stated that Bryant could potentially be "an exemplary police officer."

During Bryant's trial for Morales' murder, one of Morales' friends testified that Morales and Bryant had superficially interacted before when Bryant approached Morales and her friend, despite both girls being underage at the time, and offered to drive them in his car to a pizzeria, give them illicit drugs and edibles, and supply them with alcohol. Morales' friend testified that they refused the offer because Bryant was an adult. Another of Morales' friends testified that Bryant had seen the two of them walking and offered them a ride before, which they refused; however, the second friend testified that she did not find the offer to be strange. Police did not believe Morales and Bryant had significant interactions before the murder, and they had no relationship before the murder. Morales' sister corroborated the lack of a relationship between Bryant and Morales, confirming Bryant only happened to live and work at the same apartment complex where Morales was last seen alive.

==== Allegations of inappropriate behavior and misconduct ====
In 2018, while a student at Berkmar High School in Lilburn, Georgia, Bryant, then 17 years old, allegedly broke into a 16-year-old female high school classmate's Norcross home and stole pairs of her underwear. The victim was Bryant's neighbor and lived on his street. The girl said she and her family recognized Bryant on their surveillance footage but that they discussed the situation with Bryant's parents, who "talked [the victim's family] out of making a police report." Neither she nor her family pressed charges against Bryant. In 2023, they said they no longer had access to video footage of the break-in, but they were attempting to locate a copy of the footage with the help of the Gwinnett County police department. The former classmate also expressed regret in hindsight for not pressing charges against Bryant, speculating that he used his position of authority as a police officer to "gain Susana's trust". She also stated in 2024 that an "unidentified law enforcement officer" had allegedly contacted her shortly after the alleged burglary incident, telling her Bryant "had a promising career in both the military and police and charges against [Bryant] would jeopardize those plans"; she suggested this phone call further deterred her from pressing charges against Bryant.

In February 2018, Bryant, still 17, allegedly unsuccessfully attempted to break into another Berkmar High School classmate's home. When caught, he claimed he was attempting to review homework with the girl. That second classmate also expressed that she did not want to press charges against Bryant for the alleged attempted burglary, although her family requested that Bryant be trespassed from their home.

In 2019, Bryant, then 18 years old, allegedly broke into a third female high school classmate's home in Snellville, Georgia, walked around, and tampered with a lock on a window, although he did not steal anything. The family did not recognize Bryant from their security footage until he was arrested in Morales' case, at which point they contacted police. Subsequently, in 2023, after his arrest and jailing in Morales' case, Bryant was separately charged with first degree burglary.

While employed as a Doraville police officer, Bryant had some disciplinary infractions on his record. He was suspended for 12 hours after being "disrespectful" to a fellow officer, and he was formally reprimanded in 2022 for not submitting a missing persons report within a mandated time limit of two hours, instead waiting three days to complete the report.

In December 2022, one of Bryant's former childhood friends filed a formal complaint with Gwinnett County police concerning an incident that month where Bryant "tried to break into her apartment." The woman's neighbor owned doorbell footage that showed Bryant attempting to open the door to the former friend's apartment despite not being welcome at her property; her neighbor had additional footage showing Bryant made attempts on three separate occasions to enter the woman's apartment without permission. That former friend said she was afraid of Bryant due to his profession as a police officer and his prior military history. Bryant was questioned about this incident, but he was not charged, although he promised to not contact the woman further. Police accused the woman of "misinterpret[ing] his gesture to check on her well-being" and insisted Bryant was stopping by her apartment because she had made "a questionable post on social media that worried [Bryant]." After Bryant's arrest, the woman said that Bryant had been stalking her for a year prior and had damaged her door by kicking it in an attempt to gain entry in March 2022. After Bryant's arrest, Gwinnett County police acknowledged making a mistake in not assigning a detective to the stalking case. They also announced that they reopened the stalking case because of Morales' murder. Bryant's former friend later testified against him at his trial as a character witness by discussing his alleged attempted break-ins as evidence of "prior bad acts".

== Kidnapping, murder, and early investigation ==
At 9:40 pm on July 26, 2022, Morales texted her mother that she was walking home from a friend's house. Between 10:07 and 10:21 pm, a location-based phone app and surveillance cameras detected Morales walking away from the Sterling Glen Apartment complex in Norcross and towards her house. At some point during her walk, she suddenly started moving in the opposite direction at approximately 40 miles per hour, which suggested that Morales was in a vehicle. Her phone tracked her between 10:21 pm and 10:26 pm traveling at driving speeds on nearby roads until it suddenly stopped tracking her, signifying that its battery died or it was turned off. Investigators later theorized that Bryant threw the phone out of the car window at that point. Shortly afterwards, the app sent out a "crash alert", signifying that Morales' phone was involved in an event that caused sudden, violent movement. Her family later visited the site of the "crash alert" yet noted there were no signs of a car crash. Morales' phone was never located.

Investigators believe that Bryant kidnapped Morales around 10:21 pm on July 26, 2022, and drove her to a secluded, wooded area by Highway 316 near Dacula, Georgia. Investigators believe Bryant murdered Morales within, at most, four hours of kidnapping her; Gwinnett County Police Chief J.D. McClure stated that authorities believe she was dead by 2:00 am on July 27, 2022. Bryant then allegedly abandoned Morales' unclothed body in that same wooded area by Highway 316.

Later on the morning of July 27, 2022, Morales' mother and sister formally reported her missing. The police originally treated Morales as a runaway rather than a kidnapping victim; this designation led her family members to accuse police of "not [taking] her disappearance seriously." The designation precluded officers from investigating her case for 48 hours. Morales' family stated that they did not believe Morales would have voluntarily disappeared without making any contact with her boyfriend or family.

By August 2022, a month after Morales' disappearance, Gwinnett County police announced they needed the public's help to close Morales' case but still had not ruled out that she was a runaway, considering that they could not find evidence of abduction or physical assault. In late January 2023, a Crime Stoppers chapter for the Metro Atlanta area offered a $2,000 reward for information on Morales' whereabouts. During the time that Morales was missing, her relatives organized several rallies and walks in her honor.

== Discovery and arrest ==
At 6:30 pm on February 6, 2023, over six months after Morales' disappearance, a man riding his off-road vehicle through a forested area off of Gwinnett's Highway 316 discovered part of Morales' skeleton in the forest. He called police, and police discovered additional bones, as well as black-painted fingernails. The fingernails they found matched the black-painted fingernails Morales had in the final photograph taken of her alive on the day of her disappearance, and authorities also identified Morales through her dental records.

Authorities did not find any clothes in the forest where her body was left, leading them to surmise that her abductor placed her naked body in the woods. Authorities found a Glock 19 pistol 30 yards from the general location of her skeletal remains. The gun's serial number traced it back to Doraville police officer Miles Bryant. At 11:00 am on July 27, 2022, Bryant, then 22 years old, had made an official report alleging that the gun and his wallet were stolen from his car at the Sterling Glen Apartments, which was Morales' last known location. At the time he made the report, Bryant said he left his car door unlocked and speculated that someone broke into his car the night prior and stole the gun without taking the holster with it. According to trial testimony, the detective who handled Bryant's theft report found it "a little odd" that, despite Bryant having the serial number for his gun, Bryant expressed that he did not want officials to formally investigate the gun's disappearance. Authorities later stated that despite finding the gun near Morales' body, they did not believe Bryant shot her to death, rather theorizing that Bryant dropped the gun at the crime scene.

Police later used cell tower data to confirm that on the night July 26 and the morning of July 27, 2022, both Bryant's work phone and personal phone pinged off a tower near where Morales' body was found. Later on the morning of July 27, Bryant returned to the same wooded area. Approximately one hour later, he reported his gun stolen. Further investigations into his phone led investigators to discover several incriminating internet searches, including "How long does it take a body to decompose?" Mobile data also showed that during the time Morales was missing, Bryant had searched Google Maps for the location where Morales' body was abandoned. Bryant had conducted "extensive" internet searches on Morales' disappearance and license plate recognition cameras. The evidence of Bryant dropping his gun and returning to the crime scene the morning after convinced investigators to interrogate Bryant. During his interrogation, Bryant denied having ever known or seen Morales and claimed he had never been to the area where her body was found. After investigators presented him with evidence that he had been at the crime scene, he admitted he was in the area but claimed it was because he had been bickering with his then-girlfriend over text and video messaging and started driving aimlessly, ending up coincidentally pulling over by the area where Morales' body would be found six months later. Bryant's then-girlfriend would later testify during his trial that he "ignored her" on the night of the murder. Investigators did not believe Bryant's version of events and arrested him afterwards.

On February 13, 2023, Bryant was charged with concealment of a corpse and false report of a crime. Police said evidence showed that Bryant had abandoned Morales' naked body in the woods, and a warrant application showed that investigators suspected Bryant had raped and murdered Morales as well. He was subsequently fired from the Doraville police department. On February 22, 2023, authorities upgraded Bryant's charges to include murder and kidnapping.

== Legal proceedings ==
=== Pre-trial proceedings ===
In January 2024, Gwinnett County officials charged Bryant with attempted rape while reiterating that they had no cause of death for Morales.

In a late May 2024 preliminary hearing, prosecutors presented the evidence they intended to use against Bryant, and a judge reviewed the evidence. The judge established that the prosecution needed to present evidence of Bryant displaying "a pattern of alleged behavior" through a history of sexual misconduct accusations to "prove what they believe was his intent" due to their inability to establish Morales' cause of death, given the fact that investigators were only able to recover her skeleton, which bore no trauma or other clues as to her cause of death. Some of that evidence included allegations that Bryant had covertly used at least ten women's phones to send himself intimate photos of them without their knowledge; many of those alleged victims were under detainment while Bryant was a police officer or security guard. One of those women, the manager of a gas station, later testified during Bryant's trial that Bryant visited her gas station the night of the murder, asked to borrow her phone, stole a naked image of her, and texted it to himself, all of which was unbeknownst to her until police alerted her to the theft after Bryant's arrest. Prosecutors also presented videos Bryant allegedly recorded of himself "committing what they believed was sexual battery" against an ex-girlfriend. His relationship with that particular woman ended in June 2022, a month before Morales was kidnapped and murdered, and the woman, who testified at the hearing, was reluctant to consider herself "a victim of a sex crime". Bryant's defense attorneys countered that the evidence of Bryant's alleged sexual misconduct was not relevant or sufficiently similar to the charges of kidnapping and murder. They also argued the presentation of such evidence of misconduct or poor character might unfairly prejudice the jury against Bryant and make a conviction a more likely outcome. During the hearing, prosecutors withdrew several pieces of prospective evidence of misconduct allegations in concessions to Bryant's defense team.

Bryant was also offered a plea deal before his trial began wherein, if he pleaded guilty to all charges against him, the court would allow him to argue for a sentence of life imprisonment with the possibility of parole after serving several years in prison. Bryant rejected the plea deal.

=== Trial ===
Judge Tamela Adkins presided over Bryant's murder trial. Jury selection began on June 3, 2024. Bryant's defense attorneys asked the judge to declare a mistrial after one prospective juror said in the presence of other prospects that she had heard "weird things" about Bryant; the judge dismissed all prospective jurors who were in the room to hear the statement, as Bryant's defense attorneys argued the statement was potentially prejudicial.

In their opening statement, Gwinnett prosecutors accused Bryant of having a sexual motivation for murdering Morales: "He used his badge, and he used his position to satisfy his own sexual desires. He is a cop who turned into a killer." In the defense's opening statement, one of Bryant's defense attorneys accused the state of having insufficient evidence of the felonies with which he was charged while stressing that jurors might find her client unlikable: "At the conclusion of this trial, you will think that he's the most callous, uncaring coward that you have ever seen. [...] It's fine to hate Miles Bryant. You can hate him all you want. However, I'm going to ask you to return a verdict that holds him accountable for his actions. But it's not murder, it's not felony murder, it's not kidnapping, and it's not criminal attempt to commit a rape." His attorney conceded Bryant was guilty of making a false report but told the jury they would understand his motive for doing so by the end of the trial. Bryant's attorney also indicated that Bryant planned to testify in his own defense.

On the first day of the trial, Morales' mother, one of her sisters, and several of her friends testified about Morales' whereabouts on the evening of her murder, the evidence gathered from the location-based phone app, prior superficial interactions Morales had with Bryant, and the surveillance footage showing Morales walking towards her home before her abduction. The next day, Morales' boyfriend gave testimony showing Morales planned to return home soon but never made it.

One of Bryant's former cellmates from the Gwinnett County Jail testified as a jailhouse informant that Bryant had made comments about authorities not finding "blood [or] semen [or anything]" and testified that Bryant theorized authorities would not charge him with serious crimes due to a lack of evidence; the cellmate also claimed Bryant made comments suggesting Morales was not his only victim. The inmate also testified he was not offered any deals or benefits in exchange for his testimony. Bryant's defense attorney challenged the cellmate's credibility given that the conversations took place in areas where others could hear. A Gwinnett County medical examiner testified for the prosecution that only 85 percent of Morales' skeleton was recovered and that she was unable to find Morales' hyoid bone. The medical examiner stated that despite the lack of evidence pointing to Morales' official cause of death, a holistic view of the available evidence suggested homicide. Prosecutors also presented evidence that Bryant made an anonymous phone call to one of Morales' friends after the murder. This particular friend had designed a missing person flyer for Morales and put her phone number on the flyer, and she spoke with Bryant for several minutes. Prosecutors also called Bryant's mother, one of Bryant's ex-girlfriends, and a cell tower expert to testify with the goal of showing that Bryant had not been honest about his whereabouts on the night of Morales' disappearance.

The Atlanta Journal-Constitution referred to the case's lead detective, Angela Carter, as the prosecution's "star witness." In her testimony, she discussed her experience interrogating Bryant for three hours and confirmed Bryant was the only suspect detectives could identify in Morales' death. Detective Carter also testified that Bryant was "shaking" during his interrogation and that he appeared "extremely nervous," and that the objective of her interrogation was to get Bryant to "take responsibility and actually tell us what happened," which she was unable to do as he asserted his innocence and lack of involvement.

Bryant later refused to testify in his own defense, as he and his defense team determined that "testifying posed more risks than benefits". Bryant's lead attorney stated that Bryant was concerned that if he testified, prosecutors could present "some evidence that had been kept out," and that Bryant wanted to prevent that evidence from being brought forward. The defense presented no evidence.

==== Closing arguments and verdict ====
In her closing argument, Bryant's defense attorney countered one of prosecutors' assertions that Bryant was nervous during his interrogation because of his guilt, stating that their interrogation methods made him nervous instead. She also asserted that the state did not establish Bryant's guilt to a standard that would justify his conviction of numerous serious felonies, proposing that there was a possibility Morales overdosed on drugs and reiterating that "we don't know how this young lady died". During the trial, Bryant's lead attorney referred to him on several occasions as "a terrible police officer," and she expressed strong disapproval of Bryant's actions, saying in her closing argument, "The fact that he left her out there is one of the most disgusting things I've ever heard in my life, no matter what happened to her," but ultimately argued that the prosecution did not sufficiently prove Bryant was guilty of kidnapping or murder.

In the prosecution's closing argument, the case's lead prosecutor, Brandon Delfunt, stated that the conclusion that Morales was murdered was "obvious," and that Bryant had denied the opportunity to propose an alternate theory that Morales died of an overdose during his pre-arrest interrogation. Delfunt asked the jury to "use [their] common sense." Delfunt accused the defense of "muddy[ing] the waters to make [the case] seem deeper."

On June 12, 2024, after deliberating for fewer than six hours, the jury convicted Bryant of malice murder, felony murder, kidnapping, and false report of a crime. The jury acquitted him of attempted rape. Before sentencing, Bryant gave a brief statement saying, "I just want to apologize to everybody, to the victim's family; that's it." Several of Morales' family members, including a sister and her mother, gave emotional victim impact statements before Bryant's sentencing. Judge Adkins subsequently sentenced Bryant to life imprisonment without parole, plus 12 months in prison on the false report conviction. His attorneys indicated Bryant intended to appeal his conviction and sentence. The day after the trial concluded, he filed a motion for a new trial, stating that he was "dissatisfied" with the trial's outcome.

== Appeals and aftermath ==
=== Bryant's appeal process ===
Bryant appealed his sentence on June 13, 2024, the day after his conviction. On November 26, 2025, Bryant and a new attorney submitted a second amended motion for a new trial. In the second motion, they argued Bryant's trial attorney provided ineffective assistance of counsel.

On February 19, 2026, Bryant had a court appearance during which he formally requested a new trial. Bryant reiterated his argument that he received ineffective counsel at trial, and he called his trial attorney as his only witness. His trial attorney testified at the hearing that she understood Bryant's concerns about certain pieces of evidence presented at the trial, namely evidence concerning the location-based app and the jailhouse informant; she conceded that she may not have objected forcefully enough to questionable evidence. She said she felt the location-based app's evidence was not sufficiently reliable despite prosecutors heavily relying on that evidence in their arguments. She anecdotally cited occasions during which the same app produced erroneous alerts for her and her family members. She also stated that she did not object to that evidence because she was "trying to temper with not being [seen as an aggressive] defense attorney to the jury." The state requested additional time to submit a brief, and the judge deciding on Bryant's appeal, Judge Adkins, approved. In late March 2026, Judge Adkins refused Bryant's request for a new trial. On March 30, 2026, Bryant appealed the denial to the Supreme Court of Georgia, and the results of that appeal are pending as of May 2026.

As of May 2026, Bryant is imprisoned at the Georgia Diagnostic and Classification State Prison in Jackson, Georgia.

=== Community response and aftermath ===
The Atlanta Journal-Constitution reported that Morales' case sowed distrust between the police and Gwinnett County's large Latino community. Some Latino residents of Gwinnett accused the county's police department of treating their community in a flippant and discriminatory way by not taking their cases seriously, relying on racist stereotypes to inform their approaches to cases involving Latino victims, and subjecting members of the community to inhumane treatment. Ten days after the discovery of Morales' body, about 50 Latino residents of Gwinnett organized a protest under the name "Hispanic United Alliance" to air their grievances. Locals also compared Morales' case to those of five other Latino teenagers and young adults who had gone missing or died under questionable circumstances, and they accused police of mishandling Morales' case, saying they thought Morales may have been discovered sooner with a more aggressive police response. The Gwinnett County Police responded to these protests by saying in a written statement, "As a department, we are committed to serving our community through the delivery of professional law enforcement services in an unbiased and compassionate manner." Master Police Officer Hideshi Valle gave a separate statement assuring that "[our] detectives have continuously worked on Susana Morales' case since we received it. [...] At times there were no leads in the case. At those times, we requested the public's help in providing information via our social media and local media." Also following her murder, Police Chief McClure held a community meeting to address Latino residents' concerns, during which he contended that, while police initially viewed her case as a runaway case, they later came to believe Morales could have been the victim of a crime.

Morales' family has accused Doraville city officials of "system-wide failures" for allowing Bryant to remain employed with their police department despite his history of inappropriate behavior towards women. An attorney representing Morales' family said in a statement that "City of Doraville Police Department knew or should have known the dangers presented by then-police officer Miles Bryant but failed to take any corrective action." In April 2024, Morales' family sued the Sterling Glen Apartment complex due to their hiring of Bryant despite his behavior towards women – including alleged physical abuse of his girlfriend, witnessed by others at the complex – and documented disciplinary infractions, which they argued should have rendered him ineligible to be the complex's courtesy officer. The plaintiff in the case was Morales' father, filing on behalf of her estate.

Morales was buried at Gwinnett Memorial Park in Lawrenceville, Georgia.

== Media ==
In 2023, before and after Bryant's arrest but before he had been put on trial for Morales' murder, the Gwinnett County Police Department cooperated with The First 48 to film an episode about Morales' case. The episode follows her case from the moment it became the responsibility of Gwinnett's homicide department, which was then headed by Detective Angela Carter, including a short period during the six-month period during which Morales was still considered missing and had not been found. The episode aired in 2023.

In May 2026, 20/20 aired an episode on Morales' murder called "Tracking Susana," hosted by John Quiñones.

== See also ==
- Murder of Sarah Everard, a 2021 British case involving a civilian who was kidnapped, raped, and murdered by a police officer
- List of solved missing person cases (2020s)
