= Troy Davis =

American man executed in 2011

- Davis booking mugshot on August 23, 1989
- Born: October 9, 1968; Savannah, Georgia, U.S.
- Died: September 21, 2011 (aged 42); Georgia Diagnostic and Classification State Prison, Georgia, U.S.
- Status: Executed by lethal injection
- Motive: To avoid arrest
- Conviction: Malice murder
- Penalty: Death (August 30, 1991)

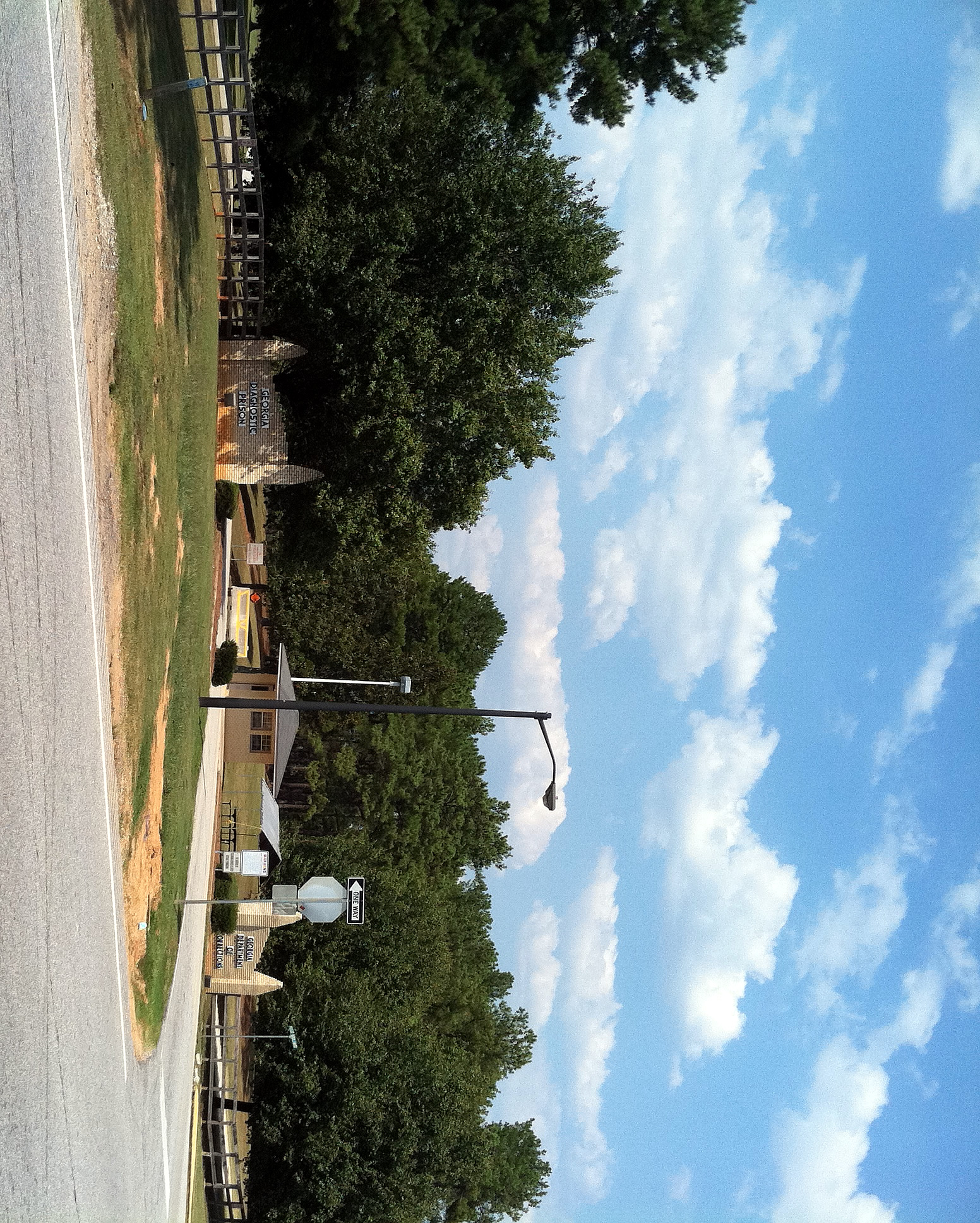
Georgia Diagnostic and Classification State Prison, where Davis was held on death row and where he was executed

Troy Anthony Davis (October 9, 1968 – September 21, 2011) was a man convicted of and executed for the August 19, 1989, murder of police officer Mark MacPhail in Savannah, Georgia. MacPhail was working as a security guard at a Burger King restaurant and was intervening to defend a man being assaulted in a nearby parking lot when he was murdered. At Davis's 1991 trial, seven witnesses testified that they had seen him shoot MacPhail, and two others testified that Davis had confessed the murder to them. There were 34 witnesses who testified for the prosecution, and six others for the defense, including Davis. Although the murder weapon was not recovered, ballistic evidence presented at trial linked bullets recovered at or near the scene to those at another shooting in which Davis was also charged. He was convicted of murder and various lesser charges, including the earlier shooting, and was sentenced to death in August 1991.

Davis maintained his innocence up to his death. In the twenty years between his conviction and execution, Davis and his defenders secured support from the public, celebrities, and human rights groups. Amnesty International and other groups such as the National Association for the Advancement of Colored People (NAACP) took up Davis's cause. Prominent politicians and leaders, including former President Jimmy Carter, Rev. Al Sharpton, Pope Benedict XVI, Archbishop Desmond Tutu, former U.S. Congressman from Georgia and presidential candidate Bob Barr, and former FBI Director and judge William S. Sessions called upon the courts to grant Davis a new trial or evidentiary hearing. In July 2007, September 2008, and October 2008, execution dates were scheduled, but courts stayed each execution before they were to take place.

In 2009, the Supreme Court of the United States ordered the U.S. District Court for the Southern District of Georgia to consider whether new evidence "that could not have been obtained at the time of trial clearly establishes [Davis'] innocence". The court held the evidentiary hearing in June 2010. The defense presented affidavits from seven of the nine trial witnesses whose original testimony had identified Davis as the murderer, but who it contended had changed or recanted their previous testimony. Some of these writings disavowed parts of prior testimony, or implicated Sylvester "Redd" Coles, who Davis contended was the actual triggerman. Evidence that Coles had confessed to the killing was excluded as hearsay because Coles was not subpoenaed by the defense to rebut it.

In an August 2010 decision, the court upheld the conviction. The court described defense efforts to upset the conviction as "largely smoke and mirrors" and found that several of the proffered affidavits were not recantations at all. Subsequent appeals, including to the Supreme Court, were rejected, and a fourth execution date was set for September 21, 2011. Nearly one million people signed petitions urging the Georgia Board of Pardons and Paroles to grant clemency. The Board denied clemency and, on September 21, it refused to reconsider its decision. After a last-minute appeal to the United States Supreme Court was denied, Davis was executed on September 21, 2011.

== Events of August 18–23, 1989 ==
The charges against Troy Davis arose from the shooting of Michael Cooper, the beating of Larry Young and the murder of Officer Mark MacPhail on August 18–19, 1989.

On the evening of August 18, 1989, Davis attended a pool party in the Cloverdale neighborhood of Savannah, Georgia. As he left the party with his friend Daryl Collins, the occupants of a passing car yelled obscenities and began shooting at a gathering of neighborhood teenagers. A bullet was fired at the passing car and Michael Cooper, a passenger, was struck in the jaw. Davis and Collins then went to a pool hall on Oglethorpe Avenue in the Yamacraw Village section of Savannah.

Later that evening, Davis and Collins proceeded to the parking lot of a Burger King restaurant on Oglethorpe Avenue, not far from the pool hall. There they encountered Sylvester "Redd" Coles arguing with a homeless man, Larry Young, over alcohol.

At about 1:15 am on August 19, 1989, Mark MacPhail, an off-duty police officer who was working as a security guard at the Burger King, attempted to intervene in the pistol-whipping of Young at the parking lot. MacPhail was shot twice: once through the heart and once in the face. He did not draw his gun. Bullets and shell casings which were determined to have come from a .38-caliber pistol were retrieved from the crime scene. Witnesses to the shooting agreed that a man in a white shirt had struck Young and then shot MacPhail.

On August 19, Coles told Savannah Police he had seen Davis with a .38-caliber pistol, and that Davis had assaulted Young. The same evening, Davis drove to Atlanta with his sister. In the early morning of August 20, 1989, Savannah Police searched the Davis home and seized a pair of Davis's shorts, found in a clothes dryer and stained with blood. Davis's family began negotiating with police, motivated by concerns about his safety; local drug dealers were making death threats because the police dragnet seeking Davis had disrupted their business. On August 23, 1989, Davis returned to Savannah, surrendered himself to police and was charged with MacPhail's murder.

=== Background of Troy Davis ===
Davis was the eldest child of Korean War veteran Joseph Davis and hospital worker Virginia Davis. The couple divorced when Davis was very young, and Davis grew up with four siblings in the predominantly black, middle-class neighborhood of Cloverdale in Savannah, Georgia.

Davis attended Windsor Forest High School, where one teacher described him as a poor student. He dropped out in his junior year so he could drive his disabled younger sister to her rehabilitation. Davis obtained his high-school equivalency diploma from Richard Arnold Education Center in 1987. A teacher noted that he attended school regularly but seemed to lack discipline. Davis's nickname at the time was "Rah," or "Rough as Hell," but some neighbors reported that it did not reflect his behavior; they described him as a "straight-up fellow" who acted as a big brother to local children.

In July 1988, Davis pleaded guilty to carrying a concealed weapon; he was fined $250 as part of a plea agreement in which a charge of possession of a gun with altered serial numbers was dropped.

In August 1988, Davis began work as a drill technician at a plant that manufactured railroad crossing gates. His boss commented that while Davis was a likeable and good worker who appeared to have positive life goals, his job attendance was poor; by Christmas 1988, he had stopped coming to work. Davis returned to the job twice in the following months but neither time remained for long.

Davis was a coach in the Savannah Police Athletic League and had signed up for service in the United States Marine Corps.

=== Background of Mark MacPhail ===
Mark Allen MacPhail Sr., was 27 years old at the time of his murder. He was the son of a U.S. Army colonel, was married, and was father to a two-year-old daughter and an infant son. He had joined the Savannah Police Department in 1986 following six years of military service as an Army Ranger. MacPhail had worked for three years as a regular patrol officer and in the summer of 1989 had applied to train as a mounted police officer.

Hundreds of mourners, including county, state, and federal law enforcement officers, attended MacPhail's funeral at Trinity Lutheran Church in Savannah on August 22, 1989.

== Trial and conviction ==
=== Pre-trial proceedings ===
On November 15, 1989, a grand jury indicted Davis for murder, assaulting Larry Young with a pistol, shooting Michael Cooper, obstructing MacPhail in performance of his duty and possession of a firearm during the commission of a crime. Davis pleaded not guilty in April 1990.

In November 1990, the presiding judge excluded forensic evidence from the pair of shorts seized at the Davis home. The judge ruled that Davis's mother did "not freely and voluntarily grant the police the right to search her home." She had testified that police officers had threatened to break down her door unless she let them into her home. The Georgia Supreme Court upheld the exclusion of the evidence in May 1991, saying that the police should have obtained a search warrant.

Davis was brought to trial in August 1991.

=== Prosecution case ===
The prosecution claimed that Davis had shot Cooper in Cloverdale, then met up with Redd Coles at a pool hall, pistol-whipped the homeless man Larry Young in the parking lot, and then killed Mark MacPhail.

The prosecution called three eyewitnesses to the shooting of Cooper:

- Cooper testified that he was intoxicated at the time he was shot, and that although Davis was one of the people Cooper had quarrelled with, he "don't know me well enough to shoot me."
- Benjamin Gordon stated that the man who had shot Cooper had been wearing a white Batman T-shirt and blue shorts. On cross-examination Gordon admitted he had not seen the person who shot Cooper and stated that he did not know Davis.
- Daryl Collins made a statement to police on August 19, 1989, that he had seen Davis shoot at the car in which Cooper was travelling. However, on cross-examination at trial, Collins denied having seen Davis carrying or shooting a gun on the night in question. Collins, who was 16 at the time he made the initial statement, claimed police officers had told him he would be imprisoned if he refused to co-operate with the investigation.

The prosecution called a number of eyewitnesses to MacPhail's murder:

- Antoine Williams testified that Davis, wearing a white shirt, had struck Young and then shot MacPhail.
- Harriet Murray and Dorothy Ferrell testified that Davis, wearing a white shirt, had struck Young and shot MacPhail. They testified Davis shot MacPhail again after he fell to the ground wounded.
- Coles testified that Davis, wearing a white shirt, had shot MacPhail. Coles admitted arguing with Young but claimed it was Davis who had hit him with a pistol. On cross-examination, Coles admitted that he owned a .38-caliber pistol but testified he had given it to another man earlier on the night in question.
- Air Force personnel Robert Grizzard, Steven Sanders, and Daniel Kinsman were also called by the prosecution. Sanders identified Davis as MacPhail's murderer. Grizzard and Kinsman stated they could not identify the gunman. Kinsman also testified that the shooter was left-handed, but Davis was right-handed.
- Daryl Collins claimed in a police statement to have seen Davis approach MacPhail. However, as with the Cooper shooting claims (above), Collins retracted the statement on cross-examination.
- Larry Young identified Davis as the man who hit him and then shot MacPhail. He could not remember the attacker's physical appearance, but identified Davis by the clothes he was wearing on the night.

Two witnesses to whom Davis was claimed to have confessed were called at trial:

- Jeffrey Sapp was a neighbor of the Davis family. He testified that Davis confessed to him soon after the murder.
- Kevin McQueen was an acquaintance of Davis who had been held at Chatham County Jail at the same time as Davis. McQueen claimed that Davis had admitted to being involved in the "exchange of gunfire" in which Cooper was shot and to have shot MacPhail because he was "paranoid...they'd seen him that night in Cloverdale."

Another witness, Monty Holmes, had testified at a preliminary hearing that Davis admitted to shooting MacPhail. He fled a subpoena to testify at trial and was never called as a witness, but the judge allowed his earlier testimony to be read to the jury.

In total, thirty five witnesses testified at trial for the prosecution.

The prosecution did not produce a weapon (neither the gun which Davis was said to have used nor the gun owned by Coles) as evidence. A ballistics expert testified that the .38-caliber bullet that killed MacPhail could have been fired from the same gun that wounded Cooper. He also stated that he was confident that .38 casings found at Cloverdale matched bullet casings found near the scene of MacPhail's shooting.

=== Defense case ===
Davis denied shooting Cooper and denied shooting MacPhail. Davis testified to having seen Coles assault Young, and Davis said that he had fled the scene before any shots were fired and, therefore, did not know who had shot MacPhail.

Six witnesses, including Davis, testified at trial for the defense. Davis's mother testified that Davis had been at home on August 19, 1989, until he left for Atlanta with his sister at about 9 pm.

=== Verdict and sentencing ===
On August 28, 1991, the jury took under two hours to find Davis guilty of murder, aggravated assault, possession of a firearm during the commission of a felony and obstruction of a law enforcement officer.

The prosecution sought the death penalty during sentencing proceedings for the murder conviction. Davis and three of his family members testified on Davis's behalf. In a final address to the jury, Davis pleaded, "Spare my life. Just give me a second chance. That's all I ask." He told jurors he was convicted for "offenses I didn't commit." MacPhail's family members and friends were not allowed to testify. On August 30, 1991, after seven hours of deliberation, the jury rendered a death verdict and Davis was then sentenced to death by the judge.

== Appeals and challenges to conviction and sentence ==
=== First appellate proceedings ===
Since the death penalty was imposed, both the conviction and sentence were automatically appealed to the Georgia Supreme Court. Davis and his lawyers requested a new trial, citing problems with the trial site and selection of the jury. The request was denied in March 1992. In March 1993, the Georgia Supreme Court also upheld Davis's conviction and sentence, ruling that the judge had correctly refused to change trial site and that the racial composition of the jury did not deny his rights. The U.S. Supreme Court declined to hear an appeal in November 1993. Direct appeals having been exhausted, in March 1994 an order was signed for Davis's execution.

=== First habeas corpus proceedings ===
In 1994, Davis began habeas corpus proceedings, filing a petition in state court alleging that he had been wrongfully convicted and that his death sentence was a miscarriage of justice. The following year, the federal funding of the Georgia Resource Center, which helped represent Davis, was cut by 70%, leading to the departures of most of the center's lawyers and investigators. According to a later affidavit by the executive director, the "work conducted on Mr. Davis's case was akin to triage... There were numerous witnesses that we knew should have been interviewed, but lacked the resources to do so." The appeal stated that the testimony of the prosecution witnesses had been coerced by law enforcement personnel. The petition was denied in September 1997, with the court ruling that claims of improper law enforcement approaches should have been raised earlier in the appeal process, and the court could not usurp the jury's role to evaluate the evidence offered during the trial. The Georgia Supreme Court affirmed the denial of state habeas corpus relief on November 13, 2000.

In 2000 Davis challenged his conviction in state court. He alleged that the use of the electric chair during executions in Georgia constituted cruel and unusual punishment. By a 4–3 margin the Georgia Supreme Court rejected the challenge, stating once again that Davis should have raised the issue earlier in the appeal process.

=== Federal appeals ===
In December 2001, Davis filed a habeas corpus petition in the United States District Court. From 1996 onwards, seven of the nine principal prosecution eyewitnesses changed all or part of their trial testimony. Dorothy Ferrell, for example, stated in a 2000 affidavit that she felt under pressure from police to identify Davis as the shooter because she was on parole for a shoplifting conviction. In a 2002 affidavit, Darrell Collins wrote that the police had scared him into falsely testifying by threatening to charge him as an accessory to the crime, and alleged that he had not seen Davis do anything to Young. Antoine Williams, Larry Young and Monty Holmes also stated in affidavits that their earlier testimony implicating Davis had been coerced by strong-arm police tactics. In addition, three witnesses signed affidavits stating that Red Coles had confessed to the murder to them. The only witnesses aside from Coles to identify Davis as the shooter who did not recant were Steven Sanders and Harriet Murray. Davis's lawyers argued that Sanders's statement was unreliable, as he had previously stated that he could not identify the shooter, and that Murray's description of the shooter resembled Coles more than Davis.

The State of Georgia argued that the evidence had been procedurally defaulted since it should have been introduced earlier. Davis's petition was denied in May 2004; the judge stated in an opinion that the "submitted affidavits are insufficient to raise doubts as to the constitutionality of the result at trial, there is no danger of a miscarriage of justice in declining to consider the claim." He also rejected other defense contentions about unfair jury selection, ineffective defense counsel and prosecutorial misconduct. The decision was appealed to the 11th Circuit Court of Appeals, which heard oral arguments in the case in September 2005. On September 26, 2006, the court affirmed the denial of federal habeas corpus relief, and determined that Davis had not made "a substantive claim of actual innocence" or shown that his trial was constitutionally unfair; the circuit court found that neither prosecutors nor defense counsel had acted improperly or incompetently at trial. A petition for panel rehearing was denied in December 2006.

Legal experts argued that a major obstacle to granting Davis a new trial was the Antiterrorism and Effective Death Penalty Act of 1996, passed after the Oklahoma City bombing, which bars death row inmates from later presenting evidence they could have presented at trial. Members of the legal community have criticized the restricting effect of the 1996 Act on the ability of wrongfully convicted persons to prove their innocence, although some scholars have remarked that federal courts limited by §2254(d)(1) could have reviewed the conviction under §2254(d)(2).

=== First execution date ===
On June 25, 2007, Davis's first certiorari petition to the U.S. Supreme Court was denied, and his execution was then set for July 17, 2007.

Davis's case gained increasing public exposure and support from organizations and prominent individuals. Nobel Peace Prize winner Archbishop Desmond Tutu urged the courts to agree to hear the evidence of police coercion and recanted testimony. An appeal to Governor of Georgia Sonny Perdue urging him to spare Davis's life was sent on behalf of Pope Benedict XVI. Similar appeals were sent by singer Harry Belafonte, Sister Helen Prejean, author of Dead Man Walking, and actor Mike Farrell. Amnesty International published a report about Davis's case characterizing it as a miscarriage of justice and a "catastrophic flaw in the U.S. death penalty machine." The human rights group initiated a letter-writing campaign and delivered 4,000 letters to the clemency board. William S. Sessions, former FBI Director and federal judge, called on authorities to halt the execution process, writing that "[i]t would be intolerable to execute a man without his claims of innocence ever being considered by the courts or by the executive". Politicians and others such as Jesse Jackson Jr. and Sheila Jackson Lee, and former Texas District Attorney Sam D. Millsap Jr., and the organization Murder Victims Families for Reconciliation requested that the courts grant Davis a new trial. U.S. Congressman John Lewis spoke to the Georgia State Board of Pardons and Paroles, suggesting that Coles—one of the witnesses who had not recanted—was the real killer. Representatives from the Council of Europe and European Parliament also spoke out on Davis's case, asking U.S. authorities to halt the planned execution and calling for a new trial.

On July 16, 2007, the Georgia State Board of Pardons and Paroles granted a ninety-day stay of execution in order to allow the evaluation of evidence presented, including the doubts about Davis's guilt. The stay was superseded by the August 2007 decision of the Georgia Supreme Court to grant Davis's application for discretionary appeal from the denial of his Extraordinary Motion for a New Trial. Defense lawyers requested a new trial based on statements of mistaken identity. On March 17, 2008, the Georgia Supreme Court denied the appeal by a 4–3 majority. The majority wrote that the recanting witnesses "have merely stated they now do not feel able to identify the shooter", that the trial testimony could not be ignored, and that they "in fact, favor[ed] that original testimony over the new." In dissent, the Chief Justice wrote that "if recantation testimony, either alone or supported by other evidence, shows convincingly that prior trial testimony was false, it simply defies all logic and morality to hold that it must be disregarded categorically".

=== Second execution date ===
In July 2008, Davis's lawyers filed a petition for a writ of certiorari in the U.S. Supreme Court, seeking review of the Georgia Supreme Court decision and arguing that the Eighth Amendment creates a substantive right of the innocent not to be executed. However, an execution date was scheduled for September 23, 2008, before the United States Supreme Court decided whether to take up Davis's case. The Georgia Supreme Court refused to grant a stay of execution and the Board of Pardons and Paroles denied clemency.

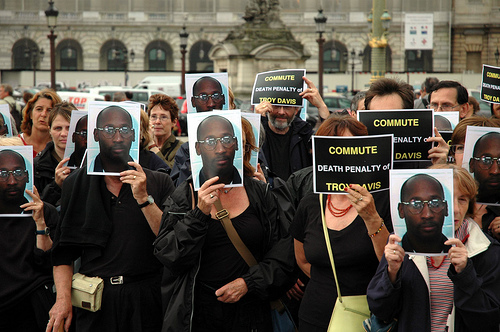
Demonstration in support of Troy Davis, Paris, July 2008

Amnesty International condemned the decision to deny clemency, and former president (and Georgia governor) Jimmy Carter released a public letter in which he stated "Executing Troy Davis without a real examination of potentially exonerating evidence risks taking the life of an innocent man and would be a grave miscarriage of justice." Reverend Al Sharpton also called for clemency after he met and prayed with Davis on death row. A stay of execution was also supported by the NAACP; the president of the Georgia state conference said "This is a modern-day lynching if it's allowed to go forward." Former Republican Congressman and Libertarian presidential candidate Bob Barr wrote that he is "a strong believer in the death penalty as an appropriate and just punishment," but that the proper level of fairness and accuracy required for the ultimate punishment has not been met in Davis's case.

A last-minute emergency stay, issued by the Supreme Court less than two hours before Davis was scheduled to be put to death, halted the execution. Lawyers for Davis argued that lower courts had failed to permit a hearing to carefully examine the recanted testimony and four witnesses who implicated Coles. Lawyers for the Georgia attorney general's office argued that most of the affidavits had already been presented and reviewed, and that questions about the quality and credibility of the witnesses were raised at the initial trial.

On October 14, 2008, the Supreme Court declined to hear Davis's petition, and a new execution date was set for October 27, 2008.

=== Third execution date ===
On October 21, 2008, Davis's lawyers requested an emergency stay of the pending execution, and three days later the 11th Circuit Court of Appeals issued a stay of execution to consider a newly filed federal habeas petition. Davis's supporters continued their appeals and actions; these included rallies held worldwide, a petition with 140,000 signatures presented to the state Board of Pardons and Paroles, and an appeal from the European Union calling for the death sentence to be commuted. In contrast, the Chatham County prosecutors asserted that Davis was guilty and deserved the death penalty.

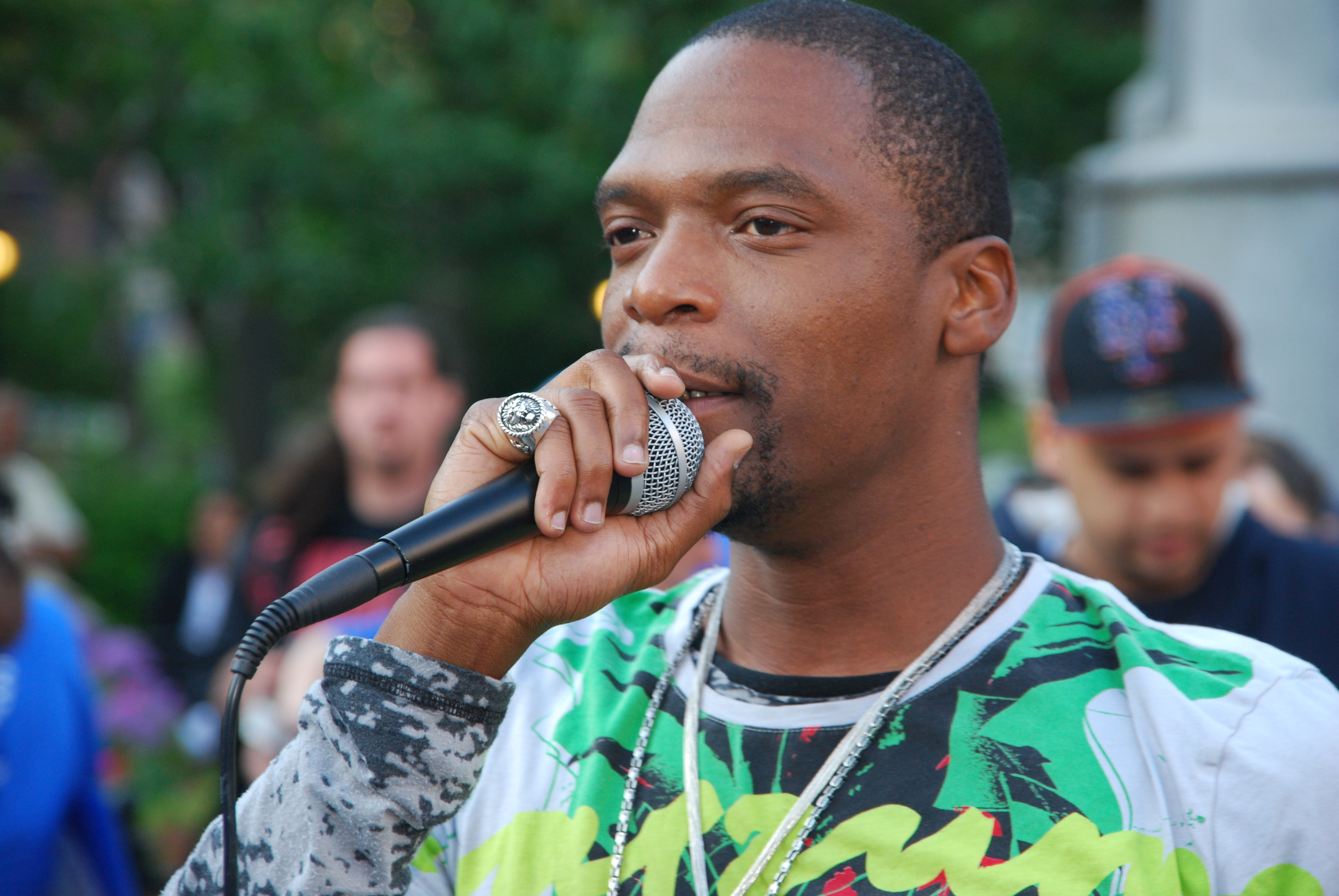
Rapper M-1 speaks at a rally held in 2009 in New York City in support of Troy Davis.

Oral arguments were heard by a three-judge panel on December 9 in Atlanta. Davis's lawyers again argued that exculpatory affidavits proving Davis's innocence had not been examined in a court of law; they noted the witnesses who had implicated Coles, and that his photo was not included among those shown to witnesses in the case. The Senior Assistant Attorney General argued that, in extraordinary cases, evidence of wrongful conviction could be heard at this stage of the appeals process, but that in this case the recantation evidence was untrustworthy, and are generally regarded with the "highest suspicion." Multiple courts and boards had also previously declined appeals. During the hearing, judge Joel F. Dubina commented: "As bad as it would be to execute an innocent man, it's also possible the real guilty person who shot Officer MacPhail is not being prosecuted." Another judge, Stanley Marcus, noted that two of the witnesses had not changed their recollections, and that no DNA evidence was available to categorically clear Davis. After the hearing, Davis's sister, Martina Correia, an active campaigner for her brother stated "This is not family against family. We have no ill will against the MacPhail family. When justice is found for Troy, there will be justice for Officer MacPhail."

On April 16, 2009, the panel denied Davis's application by a 2–1 majority. Judges Dubina and Marcus rejected the petition, stating that Davis's claims having been reviewed and rejected in the past, and that the recantations were not persuasive. Judge Rosemary Barkett, in dissent, expressed her belief that as Davis might prove his innocence, it would be wrong to execute him. In an interview, Mark MacPhail Jr. said of his father, "He gave his life for the community and now I'm trying to help out his name and help him in some way." Of the appeals process, he says, "The past two years we've had countless appeals and it just keeps on getting drug out." Of Davis, MacPhail said, "He decided to break the law. And our law says, you kill an officer of the law, who tries to uphold it, you must be punished." The 11th Circuit issued an order extending the stay of execution for 30 days to allow Davis the opportunity to file a habeas corpus petition with the U.S. Supreme Court. Davis filed a petition for habeas corpus with the U.S. Supreme Court on May 19, 2009.

On August 17, 2009, the Supreme Court ordered the Savannah federal district court to "receive testimony and make findings of fact as to whether evidence that could not have been obtained at the time of trial clearly establishes [Davis's] innocence." Justice John Paul Stevens, joined by Justices Ruth Bader Ginsburg and Stephen Breyer, wrote that "[t]he substantial risk of putting an innocent man to death clearly provides an adequate justification for holding an evidentiary hearing." Justice Antonin Scalia dissented, stating that a new hearing would be "a fool's errand" because Davis's claim of innocence was "a sure loser". He was joined by Justice Clarence Thomas.

=== Federal hearing ===
In response to the Supreme Court order, a two-day hearing was held in June 2010 in a federal district court in Savannah in front of Judge William Moore. Former prosecution witness Antoine Williams stated he did not know who had shot MacPhail, and that because he was illiterate he could not read the police statements he had signed in 1989. Other prosecution witnesses Jeffrey Sapp and Kevin McQueen testified that Davis had not confessed to them as they had stated at the initial trial. Darrell Collins also recanted his previous evidence that he had seen Davis shoot Cooper and MacPhail. The witnesses variously described their previous testimony against Davis as being the result of feeling scared, of feeling frightened and pressured by police or to get revenge in a conflict with Davis. Anthony Hargrove testified that Redd Coles had admitted the killing to him. The state's lawyers described Hargrove's testimony as hearsay evidence; Judge William T. Moore permitted the evidence but stated that unless Coles appeared, he might give the evidence "no weight whatsoever." Another witness making a similar statement was heard, but a third was rejected by Judge Moore as the claims were inadmissible hearsay because Coles was not called as a witness and given the opportunity for rebuttal. Moore criticized the decision not to call Coles, saying that he was "one of the most critical witnesses to Davis's defense". One of Davis's lawyers stated that the day before they had been unsuccessful in serving a subpoena on Coles; Moore responded that the attempt had been made too late, given that the hearing date had been set months in advance.

State attorneys called current and former police officers and the two lead prosecutors, who testified that the investigation had been careful, and that no witnesses had been coerced or threatened. The lead detective testified that his investigation was "very meticulous and careful… I was in no rush just to pick the first guy we got our hands on. I wanted the right guy." He stated that witnesses gave "strikingly similar descriptions on how the shooter was dressed", mostly describing the shooter as wearing a white T-shirt and dark pants, which other witnesses said Davis was wearing that evening. A state attorney asserted that the testimony of at least five prosecution witnesses remained unchallenged, and the evidence of Davis's guilt was overwhelming. In July 2010, Davis's lawyers filed a motion asking Moore to reconsider his decision to exclude testimony from a witness to a confession by Coles, but in August 2010, Moore stood by his initial decision, stating that in not calling Coles, Davis's lawyers were seeking to implicate Coles without desiring his rebuttal.

Moore ruled that executing an innocent person would violate the Eighth Amendment. "However, Mr. Davis is not innocent." In his decision, Moore wrote: "while Mr. Davis's new evidence casts some additional, minimal doubt on his conviction, it is largely smoke and mirrors." Of the seven papers described as recantations by the defense, Moore found that only one was wholly credible and two were partly credible. He did not consider Coles' alleged confessions because of the failure of Davis's lawyers to subpoena Coles, and suggested that Davis should appeal directly to the Supreme Court. In November 2010, the federal appeals panel dismissed an appeal on the case, without ruling on its merits. They stated that Davis should appeal the case directly to the U.S. Supreme Court "because he had exhausted his other avenues of relief." Rosemary Barkett, one of the panel judges, later released a statement saying that although she agreed with the decision, she still believed that Davis should be given a new trial.

=== Renewed U.S. Supreme Court petition ===
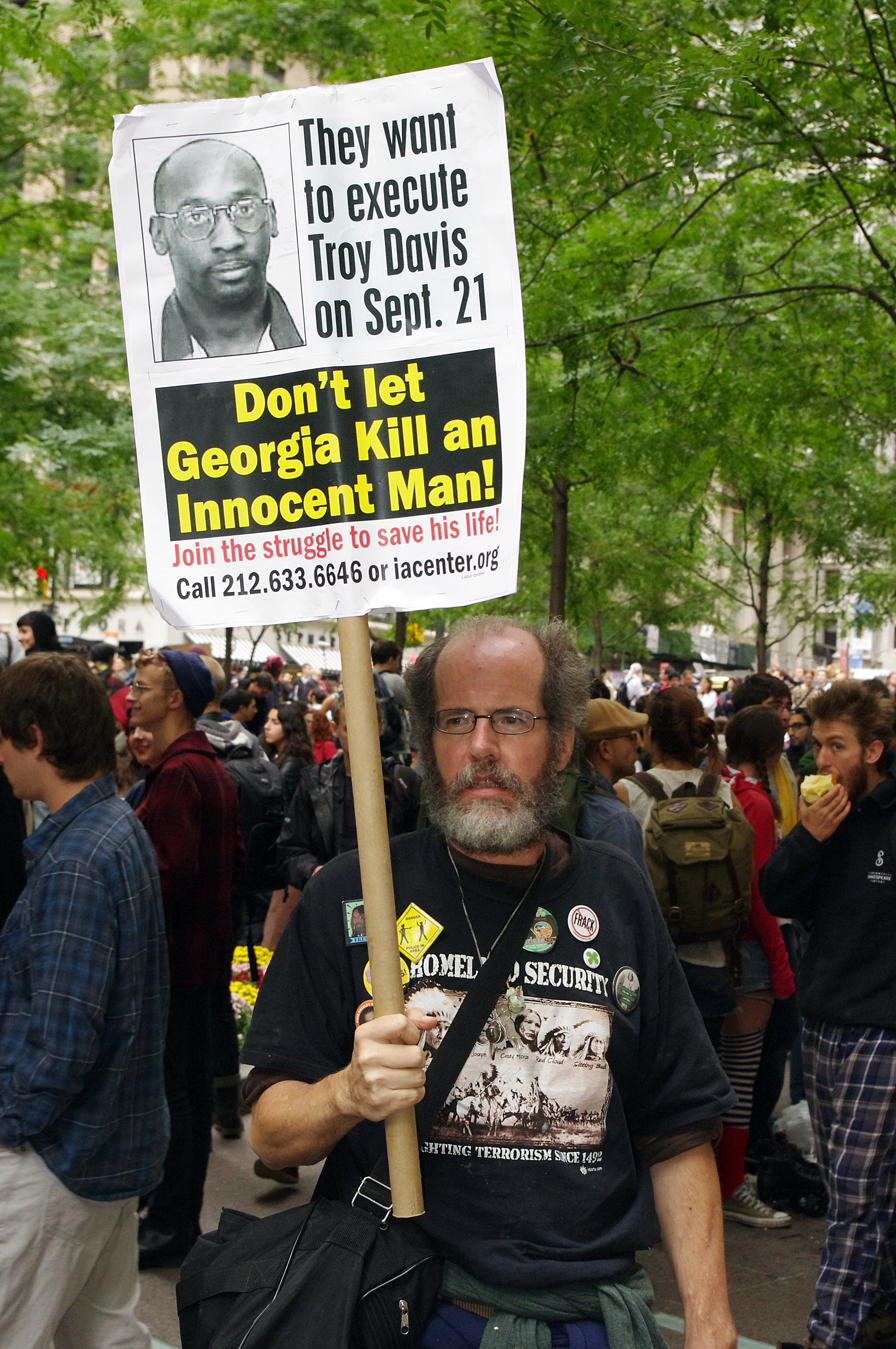
A man protesting the September 21 execution date at the September 17 Occupy Wall Street rally

In January 2011, Davis's legal team filed a new petition with the United States Supreme Court, alleging that District Judge Moore had "evinced a clear hostility" against Davis during the August 2010 hearing, and again asking for a new trial. The petition was rejected without comment by the Supreme Court in March 2011, allowing a new execution date.

In May 2011, Amnesty International and People of Faith Against the Death Penalty asked religious leaders to sign a petition to the Georgia Board of Pardons and Paroles calling for the commutation of Davis's death sentence. By September 17, 2011, over 660,000 people had signed the petition for clemency including Archbishop Desmond Tutu, Pope Benedict XVI, Archbishop Wilton Gregory, William Sessions (former head of the Federal Bureau of Investigation), former President Jimmy Carter and representatives for the European Parliament.

In contrast, law enforcement officials such as Spencer Lawton, the former Chatham County prosecutor who put Davis on trial, remained convinced of the evidence for Davis's guilt and that Davis's supporters "would know differently if they looked at the record." He stated: "We have consistently won the case as it has been presented in court. We have consistently lost the case as it has been presented in the public realm, on TV and elsewhere." Members of MacPhail's family were also convinced of Davis's guilt, and thought his execution would bring a measure of peace. His mother reported "That hole in my heart will be there until the day I die, but it [the execution] may give me some peace and quiet." Mark MacPhail Jr. stated "It's not animosity or anger or rage that has kept us going; that's not what my father would want. It's justice. The law is what he was all about. That's what we have to uphold."

== Execution ==
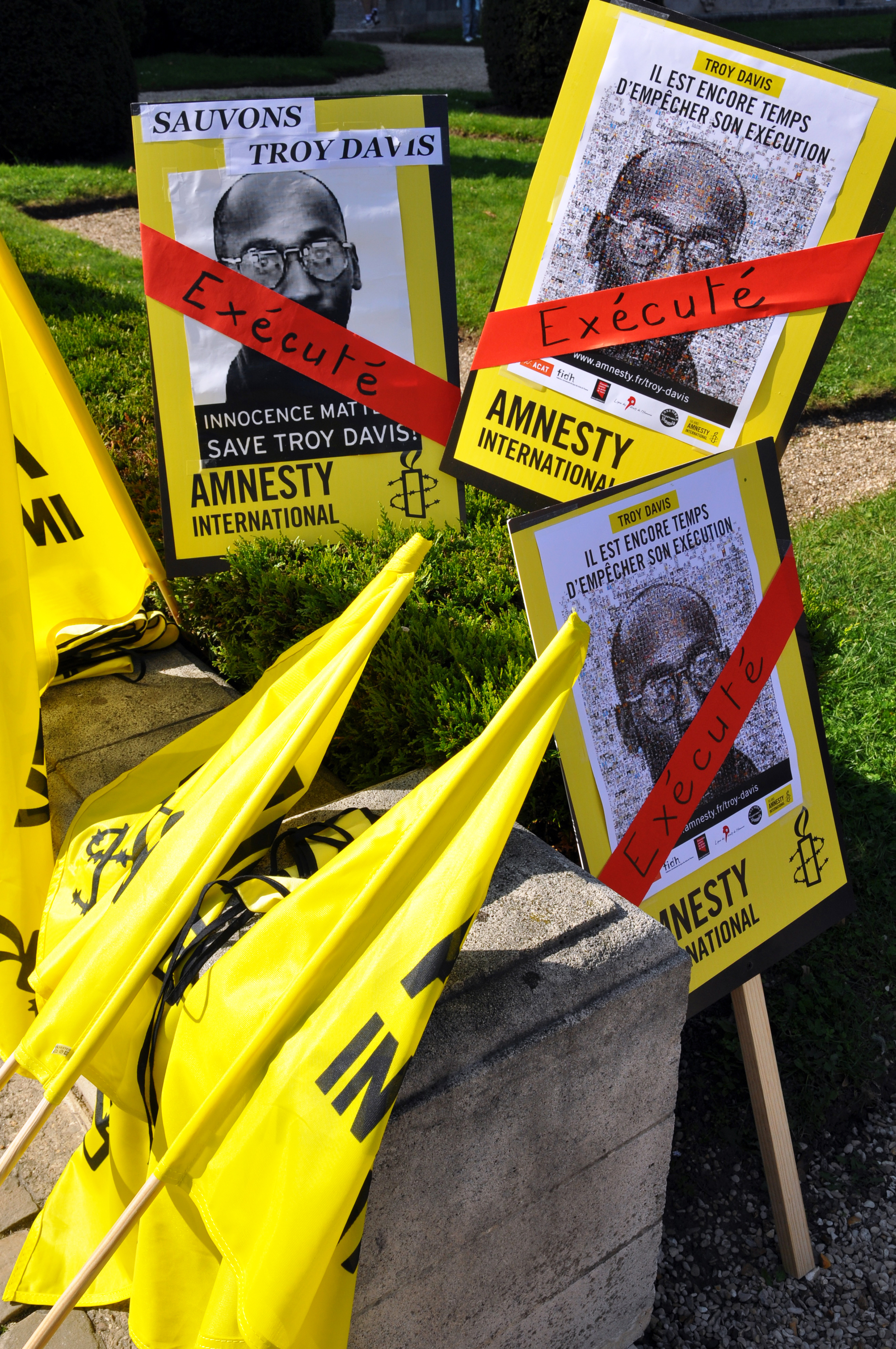
September 25, 2011 in France, after the execution of Troy Davis.

On September 7, 2011, Georgia set Davis's execution date for two weeks later, September 21. The Georgia Board of Pardons and Paroles set a hearing for Davis's second bid for clemency for September 19. This Board had not granted him clemency in September 2008, but the five-member Board now included three new members who had not previously heard the case. On September 20, the Board denied him clemency.

On the morning of September 21, the Butts County Superior Court denied Davis's request to halt his execution. The Georgia Supreme Court also denied his appeal. Davis was due to be executed at 7 p.m. EDT. The same night, Jay Carney, the White House Press Secretary, announced that President Obama would not intervene in the case (while the president could not have pardoned Davis, he did have the authority to order a federal investigation that might have led to a delay in the execution). Davis filed a request with the U.S. Supreme Court to stay his execution. Almost an hour after Davis's scheduled execution time, the Supreme Court announced they would review his petition, thereby postponing the execution. The Supreme Court, however, denied Davis's petition, after deliberating for several hours.

The execution by lethal injection began at 10:53 p.m. EDT. In his final words, Davis maintained his innocence, saying:

Well, first of all I'd like to address the MacPhail family. I'd like to let you all know, despite the situation—I know all of you are still convinced that I'm the person that killed your father, your son and your brother, but I am innocent. The incident that happened that night was not my fault. I did not have a gun that night. I did not shoot your family member. But I am so sorry for your loss. I really am—sincerely. All I can ask is that each of you look deeper into this case, so that you really will finally see the truth. I ask my family and friends that you all continue to pray, that you all continue to forgive. Continue to fight this fight. For those about to take my life, may God have mercy on all of your souls. God bless you all.

He was declared dead at 11:08 pm EDT.

Twitter recorded 7,671 tweets per second in the moments before word of Davis's execution, making his death the second-most-active Twitter event in 2011.

His funeral was attended by more than 1,000 people in Savannah, Georgia, on October 1, 2011.

== In popular culture ==
- The second episode of the second season of The Newsroom included substantial discussion of the Troy Davis case, with the character Don Keefer (Thomas Sadoski) wanting to use their network's platform to advocate for Davis's clemency.
- On the second anniversary of Davis's execution, Haymarket Books released I Am Troy Davis, a book co-authored by human rights activist Jen Marlowe, and Davis's sister, Martina Davis-Correia, with the participation of Troy Davis himself.
- On the fourth anniversary of Davis's execution, Gautam Narula released Remain Free, a memoir about his close friendship with Davis featuring hundreds of recorded conversations that took place during Davis's final three years on death row. The book won the 2016 Georgia Author of the Year Award. Narula recorded a 12-minute spoken version of his story called "Coming of Age on Death Row" which was broadcast on The Moth Radio Hour on June 26, 2018.
- 'Beyond Reasonable Doubt: The Troy Davis Project', a play written by Lee Nowell, premiered at Synchronicity Theatre in Atlanta, GA on April 8, 2016.
- Talib Kweli in his 2013 release "It Only Gets Better", off his album Prisoner of Conscious shouts R.I.P. Troy Davis.
- Hip hop band Flobots mentions Davis in their song "Sides": "Five for the name on the grave, Troy Davis".
- Hip hop band Public Enemy names Davis in their song "I Shall Not Be Moved" on their 2012 album Most of My Heroes Still Don't Appear on No Stamp.
- Rapper Kinetics, in his song "I Am a Computer", raps "Every verse poorly executed, Troy Davis".
- Dutch Rock band Paceshifters has a song "Davis" on their album "Home".
- Boston rock band State Radio released their song, "State of Georgia", about Davis on their album Rabbit Inn Rebellion.
- Chinoye Chukwu was inspired by Davis to write the screenplay for Clemency. In the film, the character Anthony Woods makes a statement similar to the final words Davis gave at his execution.

== See also ==
- List of people executed in Georgia (U.S. state)
- List of people executed in the United States in 2011

Executions carried out in Georgia
Preceded by Andrew Grant DeYoung July 21, 2011	Troy Anthony Davis; September 21, 2011	Succeeded by Andrew Allen Cook February 21, 2013
Executions carried out in the United States
Preceded by Lawrence Russell Brewer – Texas September 21, 2011	Troy Anthony Davis – Georgia; September 21, 2011	Succeeded by Derrick O'Neal Mason – Alabama September 22, 2011
