= Willie Pye =

Executed American murderer (1965–2024)

Willie James Pye
- Pye in an undated prison photograph
- Born: January 6, 1965; Georgia, U.S.
- Died: March 20, 2024 (aged 59); Georgia Diagnostic and Classification Prison, Georgia, U.S.
- Status: Executed by lethal injection
- Motive: Robbery
- Convictions: 1985; Burglary; 1996; Malice murder Robbery; Burglary; Rape; Kidnapping
- Penalty: 1985; Five years' imprisonment 1996; Death (murder); Life imprisonment (×3; robbery, rape, kidnapping); 20 years' imprisonment (burglary)

Details
- Victims: 1
- Date: November 17, 1993

Willie James Pye (January 6, 1965 – March 20, 2024) was an American convicted murderer who murdered his ex-girlfriend Alicia Lynn Yarbrough after he kidnapped and raped her with two accomplices originally committing a robbery at the home of Yarbrough's boyfriend in 1993. He was executed in March 2024.

Pye, who was convicted and sentenced to death three years after the crime, remained on death row for nearly 30 years before he was put to death via lethal injection on March 20, 2024. His case became a point of controversy due to the alleged inadequate legal representation he received during the trial, which allegedly left out details of Pye's troubled childhood and other mitigating factors that may have spared his life. Pye was the first death row convict to be executed in Georgia after a four-year moratorium on executions due to the COVID-19 pandemic.

== Personal life and crime ==
Born on January 6, 1965, Willie James Pye, who had at least nine siblings was reportedly a victim of childhood abuse and neglect, and his family members had also abused alcohol in the past. Pye's mother was the sole breadwinner of the family, and due to her husband's stints in prison, she had to work about ten to 12 hours while leaving her children (including Pye) unsupervised and they had to fend for themselves at a young age. Pye reportedly did not perform well in school, and he dropped out of junior high school; he was later diagnosed to have an IQ of 68. Pye was also, at age 20, arrested and sentenced to five years in prison for burglary in 1985, and he was released in 1990.

On November 17, 1993, eight years after his first run-in with the law, Pye was involved in the rape-murder of his ex-girlfriend Alicia Lynn Yarbrough (aged 21 in 1993), with whom he had an on-again, off-again romantic relationship prior to their final break-up. After their final break-up, Yarbrough ended up with another man, and she had a child, which Pye believed to be his, and he was angered that a birth certificate for the baby was signed with Yarbrough's lover as the child's father. On the day in question, Pye, armed with a newly bought .22 pistol, teamed up with two accomplices, 15-year-old Anthony Freeman and 25-year-old Chester Adams, to commit robbery at the lover's house, but after finding Yarbrough alone in the house with her baby, Pye and his accomplices abducted her and would later rape her at a motel, and also stole her jewelry. Afterwards, the trio drove Yarbrough down a dirt road, where Pye ordered her out of the car, told her to lie face down and shot her three times, which resulted in her death.

Yarbrough's corpse was discovered on the same day of her murder, and the trio were arrested soon after. Pye and Adams denied their involvement in the crime, while Freeman confessed to the murder and implicated both Adams and Pye. DNA tests would later confirm that the semen found on the victim's corpse belonged to Pye, which allowed the authorities to charge him as a suspect for Yarbrough's murder.

== Trial and appeals ==
During the court proceedings into the case of Yarbrough's murder, one of Pye's accomplices, Anthony Freeman, reached a plea bargain and voluntarily turned state evidence against Pye, who was convicted of malice murder, kidnapping, rape, burglary and robbery in June 1996. The jury that convicted Pye also recommended a death sentence for the charge of murdering Yarbrough, and Pye was therefore condemned to death row. In addition to the death penalty, Pye was also given a 20-year jail term for the burglary charge and three additional terms of life imprisonment for the remaining three charges. His appeal in 1998 was dismissed by the Supreme Court of Georgia.

The third perpetrator, Chester Adams, was tried in a separate court for the same charges as Pye, and pled guilty in April 1997. Unlike Pye, Adams was spared the death sentence and instead received five consecutive life sentences for his role in Yarbrough's murder, and is still incarcerated as of 2024. Freeman was similarly sentenced to life in prison for charges of murder, robbery, and burglary. After serving 24 years behind bars, Freeman was released on parole on May 4, 2020.

A controversial fact of Pye's case was that during his trial, his attorney did not adequately fulfill his duty to represent and defend Pye, which likely caused the suppression of certain mitigating factors in his favor, such as Pye's childhood. This allegation was brought forward to the courts, and although a federal judge rejected this fact in an appeal hearing, the 11th Circuit Court of Appeals would accept it in a 2021 court hearing, and as a result, a three-judge panel agreed to vacate Pye's death sentence on the grounds that Pye was subjected to prejudicial treatment due to inadequate legal representation. However, a year later, the decision was reversed by the federal appellate court, resulting in Pye's death sentence being re-instated.

== Death warrant and clemency plea ==
On February 29, 2024, it was reported that a death warrant had been issued for Pye, scheduling him to be put to death via lethal injection on March 20, 2024.

Pye's lawyers later urged for the state to grant Pye clemency and commute his death sentence to life in prison without parole, on the grounds of Pye's low IQ and troubled childhood and the inadequate legal representation in his trial back in 1996. They also claimed that Pye suffered from fetal alcohol syndrome, as a result of his mother's alcohol abuse while she was pregnant with him, which may have damaged his brain and affected his mental responsibility at the time of the killing. Three former jurors who convicted Pye stated that they did not want Pye to be executed, after citing that they would have opted for life without parole had his childhood and low intelligence been revealed during his first trial. Human rights group Amnesty International also appealed for mercy on Pye's life, and they were also set to hold a vigil on Pye's behalf.

On March 19, 2024, the Georgia State Board of Pardons and Paroles officially announced that they would not commute Pye's death sentence, and therefore turned down his clemency petition.

Pye's lawyers later filed an appeal to the US Supreme Court, seeking a stay of execution, but hours before he was executed, the judges unanimously dismissed Pye's appeal. As the scheduled timing of Pye's execution was supposed to be 7pm, the appeal hearing caused the execution to be delayed for a few hours before it was subsequently carried out.

== Execution ==
Willie James Pye was reportedly the first person to be executed in Georgia after a four-year pause on executions due to the COVID-19 pandemic. Before Pye's execution, the last execution took place in January 2020, when Donnie Cleveland Lance was put to death for a double murder in 1997.

Pye reportedly ordered a last meal of two chicken sandwiches, two cheeseburgers, french fries, two bags of plain potato chips, and two lemon-lime sodas. He was also visited by six family members, a clergy member, and an attorney for the final time before his death sentence was carried out.

Soon after the dismissal of Pye's final appeal, Pye was executed by lethal injection at 11:03 p.m. at the Georgia Diagnostic and Classification Center in Jackson, Georgia. Pye was 59 years old at the time of his death. Reportedly, before he was administered with a single dose of pentobarbital (the drug used for his execution), Pye accepted a final prayer but he did not make a final statement. Pye was the 77th person to be executed in Georgia since 1976, and as of the time of Pye's execution, 36 men and one woman (Tiffany Moss) were still held on death row in Georgia. Pye was the third person to be executed in the United States during the year of 2024.

After Pye's execution, Yarbrough's oldest daughter Tawanna Bell (the eldest of Yarbrough's three children) stated that she found closure through Pye's execution after 30 years since the rape and murder of her mother. Yarbrough's cousin Gernetta Starks also told the media that they were disappointed that the whole attention of her cousin's murder was shifted to the perpetrator instead of the victim, whom Yarbrough's family felt should be remembered, and the family also expressed support for Pye's death sentence. Aside from this, in 2021, Starks and one of Yarbrough's daughters established the organization When She Survives, which addresses the issues of domestic violence and breast cancer awareness, in an effort to honor Yarbrough.

== See also ==
- Capital punishment in Georgia (U.S. state)
- List of most recent executions by jurisdiction
- List of people executed in Georgia (U.S. state)
- List of people executed in the United States in 2024

Executions carried out in Georgia
Preceded by Donnie Cleveland Lance January 29, 2020	Willie James Pye; March 20, 2024	Succeeded by most recent
Executions carried out in the United States
Preceded by Ivan Cantu – Texas February 28, 2024	Willie James Pye – Georgia; March 20, 2024	Succeeded by Michael Dewayne Smith – Oklahoma April 4, 2024
