= Reinaldo Rivera =

Spanish-born American serial killer

- 2025 mugshot
- Born: Reinaldo Javier Rivera; September 13, 1963 (age 63); Madrid, Spain
- Conviction: Murder (1 conviction)
- Penalty: Death

Details
- Victims: 6 (4 rape-murders, 1 rape-attempted murder, 1 child abduction)
- Span of crimes: 1999–2000
- Country: United States
- States: South Carolina, Georgia
- Imprisoned at: Georgia Diagnostic and Classification State Prison, Jackson, Georgia

Reinaldo Javier Rivera (born September 13, 1963) is a Spanish-born American serial killer who abducted, raped, and killed four women in South Carolina and Georgia between 1999 and 2000, all in the Augusta metropolitan area. He was convicted in one of those deaths and sentenced to death in the latter state, where he still remains on death row.

== Early life ==
Born in Madrid, Spain, in the family of a doctor, Rivera and his family moved to Puerto Rico when he was seven years old. At age 19, he joined the United States Navy, serving in Orlando, Florida and San Diego, California. As an adult, between December 1986 and March 1991, Rivera worked for the Joint Chiefs of Staff in Washington, D.C., attending the University of South Carolina, where he earned a degree in office administration. He previously resided in Graniteville, Columbia and Fayetteville, North Carolina, before settling in North Augusta. On Valentine's Day in 1993, he married Tammy Lisa Bonnette and had two children. By 1998 Rivera acquired a job as a tire inspector for the Firestone Tire and Rubber Company in Aiken.

== Murders ==
On July 17, 1999, 17-year-old Melissa Faye Dingess, from Graniteville, SC, vanished without a trace. In the ensuing searches, deputies from the Aiken County Sheriff's Office reported that a girl matching Dingess' description was seen on two occasions, accompanied by an older white male with dark hair. She entered a tan, older-model vehicle in the first instance and, in the second, a bright red four-door one. The alleged sightings were not Dingess. Rivera was arrested on October 12, 2000, and on October 13, her skeletal remains were found in the woods off the I-20 near Harlem, GA, seven miles west of the Savannah River, after Rivera gave police directions to the burial site.

On December 4, 17-year-old Tiffaney Shereese Wilson, from Jackson, went missing while she and her two-month-old daughter Kaitlyn were visiting a Winn-Dixie grocery store in North Augusta. Her car was found in the parking lot, with witnesses seeing her enter a mid-1980s white four-door Ford, which had stopped briefly and sped off quickly. Three days later, Kaitlyn was found abandoned in her car in front of a Georgia welcome center across the state border. Suspecting an abduction, the authorities searched areas along the I-20 and Highway 25, finding clothing suspected of being Wilson's. On December 30, two hunters discovered the body of a young female in a heavily wooded area near Graniteville. The decedent was later positively identified as Wilson via her fingerprints. According to the coroners, her hands were tied behind her back, and she was raped and subsequently dealt a deadly stab in the back, all while her daughter was inside the car.

On June 19, 2000, 18-year-old Tabitha Leigh Bosdell of Augusta, Georgia disappeared in similar circumstances to the previous victims. According to her family members, they dropped her off at a Huddle House, where she was going to apply for a second part-time job before going to her main job as a telemarketer. Her skeletal remains were found on October 16, after Rivera gave police directions to her burial site.

The last murder was that of 21-year-old Marni Marie Glista, a soldier at Fort Gordon. She was attacked in her home on September 5, sustaining serious injuries but barely surviving. She was transported to a local hospital, where she died from said injuries five days later.

== Attempted murder, arrest and trial ==
On October 10, 2000, Rivera approached 18-year-old Chrisilee Barton at the parking lot of a Huddle House restaurant in North Augusta; using his confessed modus operandi, he presented himself as the owner of an escort service and a modeling agent, expressing interest in taking photos of the young lady. Barton agreed, inviting him back to her home, after which Rivera raped and stabbed her three times in the throat with a plastic-handled steak knife he took from the kitchen. Barton survived the assault, and with her help, investigators were eventually led to Rivera, who was found on October 13, hiding in a South Carolina motel. Upon discovery, he had written a suicide note and slashed his wrists, but the arresting officers acted quickly and EMD were called to transport him to Medical College of Georgia, where he was kept under suicide watch in an isolated cell.

Charged with the murders of Wilson, Bosdell, and Glista and the attempted murder of Barton, Rivera was eventually convicted solely for Glista's murder and assaulting Barton. At the end of his trial, Rivera was quoted as saying to the jurors that he was mentally ill and that doctors should study his ailment to find a cure. In addition, he said that he still fantasized about killing his victims, warning that he would do it again if released, and asked for the death penalty. He was sentenced to death for killing Glista and remains on Georgia's death row at the Georgia Diagnostic and Classification State Prison in Jackson.

== See also ==
- List of death row inmates in the United States
- List of serial killers in the United States
