= Martina Davis-Correia =

American civil rights activist

Martina Davis-Correia (May 13, 1967 – December 1, 2011) was an American civil rights activist. She was the older sister of Troy Anthony Davis, a cause célèbre in the campaign to abolish capital punishment. Davis-Correia was a steadfast supporter and public organizer on his behalf.

The week before her brother's execution, Correia made an emotional, symbolic gesture in support of him when she got up from her wheelchair. "I'm here to tell you that I'm going to stand here for my brother today," she said. Correia then stood up on stage with the help of others around her.

The COO of Amnesty International called Davis-Correia "a powerful example of how one person can make a difference ... she remained brave and defiant to the core of her being, stating her conviction that one day [her brother's] death would be the catalyst for ending the death penalty." The full statement by Amnesty is here.

Davis-Correia was a trained nurse and served in the 1991 Gulf War. To obtain a voice in civic society, she turned to organizations within civic society. These included Georgians for an Alternative to the Death Penalty, The Campaign to End the Death Penalty, on whose national board she served, and Amnesty International, where she chaired the Steering Committee for Amnesty International/USA's Program to Abolish the Death Penalty and where, for 11 years, she served as Amnesty International's coordinator in Georgia for local death penalty programs.

== Death ==
A former Army flight nurse who served in the Gulf War, she had been diagnosed with liver and metastatic breast cancer, which claimed her life at age 44, after a decade-long battle. She was survived by her son, De'Jaun, as well as three siblings and a niece.

== Awards ==
- The Georgia Civil Liberties Award from the American Civil Liberties Union, 2009
- The Frederick Douglas Award from the Southern Center for Human Rights, 2009
- The Sean McBride Award for Outstanding Contributions to Human Rights from the Irish section of Amnesty International.
