= Murder of Laken Riley =

2024 murder in Athens, Georgia, US

- Photo of Laken Riley
- Location: 33.9279°N 83.3728°W; University of Georgia—Oconee Forest Park, Athens, Georgia, US
- Date: February 22, 2024 c. 9:06 a.m. – 9:32 a.m. (EST)
- Attack type: Attempted sexual assault, murder by blunt trauma and asphyxiation, kidnapping, beating, crime of opportunity
- Victim: Laken Riley
- Perpetrator: José Antonio Ibarra
- Motive: Sexual assault
- Verdict: Guilty on all counts
- Convictions: Felony murder (3 counts); Malice murder; Kidnapping with bodily injury; Aggravated battery; Aggravated assault with intent to rape; False imprisonment; Hindering an emergency telephone call; Concealing the death of another; Peeping Tom (Note: According to Georgia state law on "Peeping Tom", a person violates the statute when they enter or remain on another's premises with the intent to act as a peeping tom. In this case, Ibarra was charged for allegedly going to a University of Georgia apartment building on the same day as the murder, looking through a window and spying on a student.)
- Sentence: Life imprisonment without the possibility of parole

On February 22, 2024, Laken Riley, a 22-year-old Augusta University nursing student, was attacked and murdered while she was jogging at the University of Georgia (UGA) in Athens, Georgia, United States. Her body was found in Oconee Forest Park near Lake Herrick; her death was caused by blunt force trauma and asphyxiation. The perpetrator, José Antonio Ibarra, was a 26-year-old Venezuelan man who had entered the United States illegally. He was arrested by UGA police and charged with 10 counts, including felony murder, malice murder, false imprisonment, aggravated assault with intent to rape, and kidnapping. Ibarra was found guilty on all charges on November 20, 2024, and sentenced to life in prison without the possibility of parole.

Riley's death generated extensive media attention. It sparked a debate over illegal immigration in the United States after US Immigration and Customs Enforcement (ICE) confirmed Ibarra is not a US citizen and was caught crossing the border but was released into the United States. On March 7, 2024, the House of Representatives passed the Laken Riley Act, a bill that would require federal detention of illegal immigrants arrested for burglary or theft. On March 14, 2024 Senate Judiciary Committee Chair Dick Durbin (D-IL) and other Senate Democrats formally objected to the bill being passed via unanimous consent, arguing that the legislation was a Republican political maneuver being rushed to the floor to score points rather than a bill that had undergone proper legislative debate, committee hearings, and amendment processes. The bill again passed the House of Representatives with bipartisan support on January 7, 2025, and an amended version passed the Senate on January 20 during the 119th Congress. It became the first bill signed into law by President Donald Trump in his second term.

== Victim ==
Laken Hope Riley was born on January 10, 2002, in Marietta, Georgia, to Jason Riley and Allyson Phillips. She had three siblings. In 2020, she graduated from River Ridge High School where she was a member of the cross-country team. Riley's former cross-country running coach Keith Hooper described her as "a beautiful person, passionate about her health care studies and an unselfish teammate". Riley, who was 22 years old at the time of her death, was a nursing student at Augusta University in Athens, Georgia, and had previously attended the University of Georgia as an undergraduate. She was an active member of the Alpha Chi Omega sorority.

== Murder ==
Locations of interest in the death of Laken Riley

On February 22, 2024, Riley went for a morning run at the University of Georgia (UGA). At 8:55 a.m., Riley texted her mother: "Good morning, about to go for a run if you're free to talk". At 9:03 a.m., Riley called her mother. At 9:05 a.m., Riley is seen on security camera footage jogging with her phone in her hand and at 9:06 a.m., is last seen on camera turning toward the Oconee Forest park. During her attack, Riley's phone called 911 at 9:11 a.m. Riley was attacked and killed between 9:06 a.m., and 9:32 a.m. Investigators determined that during the attack Ibarra had attempted to sexually assault Riley and partially removed some of her clothing before striking her in the head with a rock, killing her. Riley's mother tried to contact her multiple times through calls and texts but did not receive any response.

At 12:07 p.m., Riley's roommate reported her disappearance to the UGA police after she did not return. At 12:38 p.m., Riley's body was discovered by UGA police in Oconee Forest Park behind Lake Herrick. Sergeant Kenneth Maxwell noted that Riley had visible injuries and could not locate a pulse. Maxwell then administered CPR to Riley but was unable to resuscitate her. According to Dr. Michelle DiMarco, who performed Riley's autopsy, Riley had sustained eight cuts to the left side of her head causing a complex skull fracture; there was also discoloration and hemorrhaging to the right side of her head and she suffered abrasion, contusion and laceration injuries to her left ear, neck, torso, abdomen, left hand and left leg. Moreover, there was petechias in her eyes and gums. Her cause of death was determined to be blunt force trauma and asphyxiation. Riley's smartwatch, which she was wearing at the time, showed that her heart stopped at 9:28 a.m. UGA police described Riley's murder as a "crime of opportunity" and reported that the killer appeared to have acted alone. There had not been a murder on the university's campus since 1983.

== Perpetrator ==
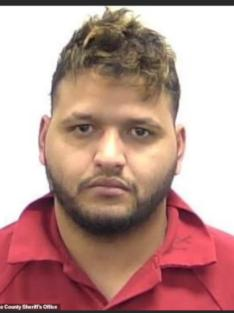
Mugshot of Ibarra in February 2024

The perpetrator was identified as José Antonio Ibarra, a 26-year-old Venezuelan man who had entered the United States illegally via the United States-Mexico border near El Paso, Texas, in September 2022, where he was apprehended by federal authorities but later released into the country. Ibarra initially stayed at the Roosevelt Hotel migrant shelter in New York before boarding a flight to Georgia, where his brother lived. UGA police stated that he lived in an apartment complex about 1 mile (1.6 km) from the woodland area where Riley's body was found.

Ibarra had previously been arrested by both federal and state officials in multiple jurisdictions. In September 2023, Ibarra was arrested in New York City on charges of "acting in a manner to injure a child less than 17 and a motor vehicle license violation" for driving a scooter without a license with a child who was not wearing a helmet. ICE stated that New York City police released him before a detainer could be issued. In October 2023, José and his brother, a temporary worker at UGA, were arrested by Athens police on charges of theft for reportedly possessing stolen merchandise from a local Walmart, then later released. José Ibarra was later subject to a bench warrant, issued in December 2023, after he failed to appear in court for the Georgia shoplifting case.

Ibarra was questioned by police after Riley's hair was found on a jacket in a dumpster near his apartment. Ibarra's roommate identified him after police obtained surveillance footage of a man disposing of the jacket in the dumpster. During questioning, police noted that Ibarra's knuckles were red and he had scratches on his arms. Ibarra was subsequently arrested on murder charges.

== Criminal proceedings ==
On May 8, 2024, a grand jury in Clarke County indicted Ibarra with ten charges: three charges of felony murder, malice murder, false imprisonment, kidnapping, aggravated assault with intent to rape, hindering a 911 call, concealing the death of another, and being a peeping Tom. He pleaded not guilty to all charges. Bail was denied. The district attorney sought a sentence of life imprisonment without the possibility of parole. In a court filing, the defense attorneys submitted a motion to move the trial to another county due to the media attention surrounding the case, but Judge H. Patrick Haggard denied it.

Ibarra waived his right to a jury trial and opted for a bench trial, which began on November 15, 2024. Prosecutors presented evidence that included Ibarra's DNA under Riley's fingernails and Ibarra's fingerprint on Riley's phone screen. Ibarra's defense said that evidence against him was circumstantial. On November 20, 2024, Judge Haggard found him guilty of all charges and sentenced him to life in prison without the possibility of parole. Ibarra's attorneys filed a motion before Judge Haggard for a new trial, arguing that his rights were violated by the court's failure to delay the trial so that the defense's expert could review the DNA evidence and the court refusing to exclude some cellphone evidence. This motion was denied on March 9, 2026, with Judge Haggard writing that the evidence against Ibarra was "overwhelming and powerful", and granting the delay would not have affected the verdict. Ibarra is imprisoned in the Georgia Diagnostic and Classification State Prison.

== Reactions ==
Riley's murder drew widespread public interest and international media attention, especially in the United States. Protests in response to Riley's death were held locally in Georgia. A funeral was held on March 1, 2024, at the Woodstock City Church with more than 1,000 people attending the service. Riley's family started an online fund to raise money for the foundation, called the "Laken Hope Riley Foundation". Riley's parents, Jason Riley and Allyson Phillips, were invited to the State of the Union by Georgia congressman Mike Collins, but they turned down his invitation. President Joe Biden mentioned the murder of Riley during the 2024 State of the Union address, after Congresswoman Marjorie Taylor Greene shouted Riley's name at the president.

Sara Dorn, writing for Forbes, said Riley's murder became a "national political case" during a "historic surge in border crossings during Biden's tenure". Donald Trump mentioned Riley during his speech for the Republican Party's presidential nomination. Riley, along with other women and girls reportedly killed by undocumented immigrants including Jocelyn Nungaray, a 12-year-old Houston girl killed in June 2024, were heavily featured in the Trump 2024 presidential campaign and his political advertisements on illegal immigration and border security. Andrea Cavallier from The Independent discussed the dangers and threats that women face when they run solo, using the murders of Riley; Mollie Tibbetts, a 20-year old Iowa university student who was murdered by an undocumented immigrant while she was jogging in 2018; and Karina Vetrano, a 30-year-old American woman who was murdered while running in a neighborhood of Queens, New York City, as examples.

The case was taken up by prominent Republicans to support tougher immigration policies. Senator Lindsey Graham stated that the killing of Riley would "change the 2024 election as much as anything". Democrats accused Republicans of politicizing the tragedy. Representative Jerry Nadler stated that Republicans were exploiting Riley's death for "a partisan stunt" and "throwing together legislation to target immigrants in an election year" while Representative Veronica Escobar stated, "We all want Laken Riley’s murderer to be held accountable ... Republicans should be ashamed of exploiting this tragedy for their dangerous political games." She subsequently voted against the Laken Riley Act.

In December 2025, US Immigration and Customs Enforcement launched "Operation Angel's Honor", a two-week arrest operation that they said was in honor of Riley. The operation was under the authority of the Laken Riley Act and led to over 1,000 suspected illegal immigrants being detained, some of whom were accused of serious crimes such as rape, assault with a deadly weapon and attempted felony murder. In February 2026, Jason Riley filed a wrongful death lawsuit against the Board of Regents of the University system of Georgia and the owners of the apartment complex where Jose Ibarra lived, alleging "negligent acts" led to his daughter's death.

== Laken Riley Act ==
On March 7, 2024, the House of Representatives passed the Laken Riley Act in a 251–170 vote, with 37 Democratic members joining all Republican members in voting for the bill. The enactment of the Laken Riley Act mandates the federal detention of illegal immigrants who are arrested for burglary or theft and allows states to file suit against the federal government for failing to enforce immigration laws. The bill stalled amid opposition in the Democratic-controlled Senate in the 118th Congress.

On January 7, 2025, the Laken Riley Act again passed the House of Representatives with a vote of 264–159. All Republican members voted for the bill, with 48 Democratic members joining in support of it as well. This marked the first piece of legislation passed by the House of Representatives in the newly elected 119th Congress, which began on January 3, 2025. The Senate passed an amended version of the bill on January 20, 2025, with all Republicans and 12 Democrats voting in favor, which was also passed in the House on January 22. President Trump signed the bill into law on January 29, 2025.

== See also ==
- Illegal immigration to the United States and crime
- Remembrance Project
- Murder of Jamiel Shaw II
- Murder of Joshua Wilkerson
- Killing of Kate Steinle
- Murder of Mollie Tibbetts
- Murder of Rachel Morin
- Killing of Jocelyn Nungaray
