= Georgia Diagnostic and Classification State Prison =

Men's prison in Georgia, United States

Georgia Diagnostic and Classification State Prison (GDCP)
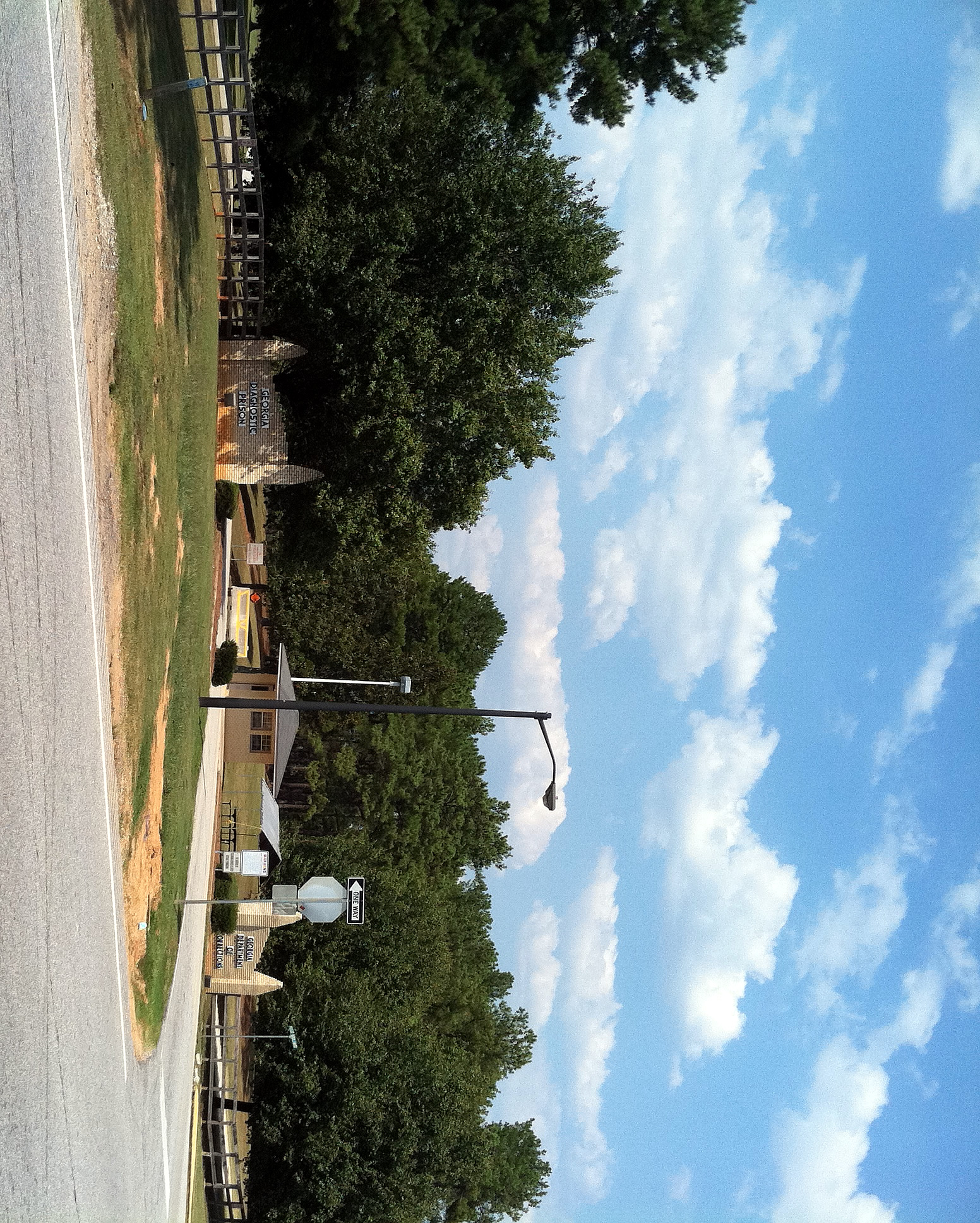
- Georgia Diagnostic and Classification State Prison Entrance on Hwy. 36 in Butts County, Georgia

- Location in Georgia
- Location: Butts County (Jackson address), Georgia, U.S.; 33°13′16″N 84°03′39″W
- Status: Operational
- Security class: Maximum Security / Death Row
- Capacity: 2,300
- Population: Adult Male Felons - 2,238 Inmates - 5.67% of state prison population.
- Opened: 1968 (renovated in 1998)
- Managed by: Georgia Department of Corrections
- Governor: Brian Kemp
- Warden: Antoine Caldwell
- Website: gdc.georgia.gov/ga-diagnostic-class-prison

Opened in 1969, Georgia Diagnostic and Classification Prison (GDCP) is a Georgia Department of Corrections prison for men in unincorporated Butts County, Georgia, near Jackson. The prison holds the state execution chamber. The execution equipment was moved to the prison in June 1980, with the first execution in the facility occurring on December 15, 1983. The prison houses the male death row (UDS, "under death sentence"), while female death row inmates reside in Arrendale State Prison.

The prison, the largest in the state, consists of eight cellblocks containing both double-bunked and single-bunked cells. There are also eight dormitories and a medical unit. The prison conducts diagnostic processing for the state correctional system, houses male offenders under death sentence (UDS), and carries out state-ordered executions by lethal injection. The prison complex also contains a special management unit that houses some of the most aggressive and dangerous prisoners in the correctional system.

== Diagnostics and Classification ==
The Georgia Diagnostic and Classification Prison serves as a central hub where sentenced felons begin the process of being admitted into the Georgia State Correctional System. Numerous county jails are paid by the state to house sentenced felons until space becomes available in the prison system. Sentenced felons may spend years in local jails until housing space becomes available in the state prison system. While at GDCP, inmates are either in the process of being classified and tested, or they are assigned as a "permanent." Those inmates who are "permanents" will serve their entire sentence at the GDCP, while the remainder of inmates will be tested and then moved to other prisons based on their classifications. According to published research statistics by the Georgia Department of Corrections, inmates who are being diagnosed and classified undergo a battery of tests and diagnostic questionnaires. Tests and diagnostic notations include: the culture fair IQ test; Wide Range Achievement Test (WRAT) (reading, math, and spelling); scope of substance abuse (summary & detailed report); latest mental health treatment; PULHESDWIT medical scale; criminality, alcoholism, and/or drug abuse in immediate family; one or both parents absent during childhood; manipulative or assaultive tendency diagnostics; and criminal history report with prior incarcerations and a full account of all previous and current offenses.

== Death Row ==
Georgia Department of Corrections male Death Row (Under Death Sentence - UDS) inmates are housed at the GDCP. The latest report (As of September 25, 2021) shows a total of thirty-nine (39) male felons currently housed on Georgia's Death Row. Women under the sentence of death are housed at the Arrendale State Prison.

The site of execution was moved from the Georgia State Prison to GDCP in June 1980, and a new electric chair was installed in place of the previous one, which was moved to a display at the Georgia State Prison. On December 15, 1983, the first execution at GDCP occurred.

== "Death House" ==
The "Death House" is an isolated structure where state ordered executions are carried out. The "house" is a single-entrance fortified building, accessed only through the prison yard. Upon entry to the Death House, witnesses to executions are immediately located in an observation room, approximately 20' X 20' (6 m X 6 m), with three 16' (4.9 m) long wooden benches to seat them. When seated, a glass window is seen directly in front of the first row of benches. An access door to the left of the viewing window leads to the execution room. Immediately to the right of the observation room (but still within it) is a storage area that houses the non-functional electric chair (nicknamed "Old Sparky") that was used before the implementation of lethal injection.

The execution chamber proper is approximately 8' X 12' and is occupied by a gurney outfitted with sheets and pillow. Continuing through the execution chamber, there is a holding room off the right side as viewed from the observation room with a single-cell complex. The "Death Watch" cell consists of a standard holding cell, with a sink, toilet, and shower included within the one-cell complex. There is a small observation area immediately outside of the cell where two corrections officers are assigned to 24/7 security detail once an inmate is placed on "Death Watch."

There is a private observation room with one-way glass directly behind the execution room that is accessed through the holding room. This room is where the old electrical supply panel is housed that energized the formerly used electric chair. Also, there are two circular line ports through the block wall where chemical lines are fed to the execution room. This room is where the executioners, warden, and other authorized personnel maintain watch over the execution and the administration of the lethal injection drugs: sodium thiopental that was previously used to induce unconsciousness; pancuronium bromide (Pavulon) to cause muscle paralysis and respiratory arrest; and potassium chloride to stop the heart.

=== Use of pentobarbital ===
The 50th person executed in Georgia since 1973 was Roy Willard Blankenship on June 23, 2011; it was the first execution carried out using a new sedative, pentobarbital, replacing sodium thiopental. In March 2011, agents with the U.S. Drug Enforcement Administration seized Georgia's supply of sodium thiopental, which attorneys for several death row inmates said Georgia had improperly imported from a pharmacy operating out of the back of a driving school in England. Hospira Inc. of Illinois, the only U.S. company that manufactured sodium thiopental, said in January it would stop making the drug after Italy, where it planned to move production, objected because the European Union has banned the export of drugs used for death penalty.

Several states have either run out of supplies of sodium thiopental or switched to pentobarbital, a barbiturate often used to euthanize animals.

== Scheduled and stayed executions ==
Condemned murderer Marcus Ray Johnson was scheduled to be executed exactly two weeks after Troy Anthony Davis in the same execution chamber. Johnson was scheduled to be executed on Wednesday, October 5 at 7 pm ET. On Tuesday, October 4, 2011, Dougherty County Superior Court Judge Willie Lockett halted the execution amid discovery evidence presented to the defense by Law Enforcement. The judge ruled that further DNA testing should be completed on the new evidence prior to the execution moving forward. The Dougherty County Superior Court ordered the execution of convicted murderer Marcus Ray Johnson. The court ordered the Georgia Department of Corrections to carry out the execution on a date between November 19–26, 2015. Commissioner Homer Bryson has set the date for Thursday, November 19, at the Georgia Diagnostic and Classification Prison in Jackson at 7 p.m. Johnson was convicted in 1998 for the murder of Angela Sizemore and executed on November 19, 2015. Johnson was the 36th inmate put to death by lethal injection.

The Paulding County Superior Court ordered the execution of convicted murderer Nicholas Cody Tate. The Court ordered the Georgia Department of Corrections to carry out the execution on a date between January 31, 2012, and February 7, 2012. Former Commissioner Brian Owens has set the date for January 31, 2012 at the Georgia Diagnostic and Classification Prison in Jackson at 7:00 p.m. Tate was convicted of the 2001 murder of Chrissie Williams and her 3-year-old daughter, Katelyn Williams. Approximately two hours prior to the scheduled 7 PM execution on 31-January-2012, a judge issued a stay of execution. Tate reversed course and decided to fight the state in a move that could delay his execution for years, said Lauren Kane, a spokeswoman for Georgia Attorney General Sam Olens. "He apparently decided he wanted to appeal," Kane added. Tate was originally convicted of the 2001 murder of a mother and her toddler daughter during a home invasion.

On April 17, 2012, The State Board of Pardons and Paroles granted a stay of up to 90 days to condemned inmate Daniel Greene. In a statement released, the board said the stay was issued to allow more time to examine claims from Greene's representatives at a hearing. The board says they may lift the stay and grant clemency, commuting Greene's death sentence to life in prison, or they may deny clemency. Daniel Greene's execution delay was the third consecutive delay of a scheduled execution of a condemned inmate in the Georgia Correctional System. On April 20, 2012, The Georgia Board of Pardons and Paroles granted clemency to Greene, reducing his original death sentence to life without the possibility for parole. Greene's was the fourth death sentence commuted by the five-member board since 2002 and the first since 2008. Greene was originally sentenced to death in the 1992 murder of Bernard Walker as Walker was trying to lend aid to a store clerk who had been robbed and stabbed by Greene. Greene is currently serving his life sentence at Ware State Prison.

On July 19, 2013, Warren Lee Hill was granted a stay of execution for a fourth consecutive time only an hour before his scheduled execution time. Hill was originally tried, convicted, and sentenced to life in prison for the murder of his girlfriend by shooting her 11 times. In 1990, Hill murdered another inmate with a nail-studded board at Lee State Prison in Leesburg, Georgia. Hill was tried, convicted, and sentenced to death by lethal injection for his second murder. On January 27, 2015, Hill was executed by lethal injection at the Georgia Diagnostic and Classification Prison in Jackson, Georgia. He was pronounced dead at 7:55 P.M.

== Brian Nichols ==
Atlanta courthouse shooter Brian Nichols was transferred here to partake in his diagnostics for the Georgia DOC. Nichols poses a high escape risk. Due to this classification, Nichols is periodically moved within the prison complex so that he does not become accustomed to one area or established prison area routines. This information was provided by a prison official who is authorized to release this information.

== Georgia Department of Corrections ==
Before GDC decided to relocate its headquarters to the former Tift College, in the 2000s it considered moving its headquarters to GDCP.

== Executions in the State of Georgia ==
- List of people executed in Georgia (U.S. state)

== Notable inmates ==
=== Current ===
- Miles Bryant, former Doraville police officer who was sentenced to life imprisonment without the possibility of parole for the kidnapping and murder of Susana Morales in 2022. His appeal of his conviction to the state Supreme Court is pending as of May 2026.
- Stacey Humphreys – sentenced to death for shooting and killing two real estate agents in 2003.
- Jose Ibarra - sentenced to life for the murder of Laken Riley.
- Robert Aaron Long - perpetrator of the 2021 Atlanta spa shootings, in which he murdered 8 people; serving four life sentences without the possibility of parole
- Brian Nichols - serving time for murder, kidnapping, and armed robbery.
- Virgil Delano Presnell Jr., who was sentenced to death in 1976 for the kidnapping and murder of Lori Smith. Presnell is the state's longest-serving death row inmate.
- Reinaldo Rivera - charged with the murders of four individuals but convicted of one; sentenced to death.
- Zachary Zulock – sentenced to 100 years in prison without the possibility of parole for child sexual abuse, involving his two adoptive sons.

=== Former ===
- William Bryan (born 1969), assisted the McMichaels in the murder of Ahmaud Arbery; moved to Valdosta State Prison in January 2023.
- Ashley Diamond (born 1978), transgender civil rights activist convicted of several crimes; was held briefly at GDCP.
- Sidney Dorsey - former sheriff who ordered the killing of Derwin Brown in 2000, after Dorsey lost an election to him. Transferred to Augusta State Medical Prison. Died March 2026.
- Gary Hilton (born 1946), serial killer; was held during trial.
- Greg McMichael (born 1955), one of the convicted killers of Ahmaud Arbery; moved to Augusta State Medical Prison in January 2023.
- Travis McMichael (born 1986), one of the murderers of Ahmaud Arbery; moved to Hays State Prison in January 2023.
- William J. Pierce (1931–2020), serial killer; died at GDCP.

=== Executed ===
- Jack Alderman (1951–2008), convicted of murdering his wife; executed by lethal injection.
- Andrew Brannan (1948–2015), convicted of murdering Kyle Dinkheller; executed by lethal injection.
- Christopher Burger (1959–1993) and Thomas Dean Stevens (1957–1993), who were both convicted of the 1977 murder of Roger Honeycutt; both men were executed by the electric chair.
- Robert Butts (1977–2018) and Marion Wilson (1976–2019), convicted of murdering Donovan Parks; executed by lethal injection.
- Robert Dale Conklin (1961–2005), who was found guilty of the 1984 murder of his homosexual lover George Crooks. He was executed on July 12, 2005.
- Troy Davis (1968–2011), convicted of murdering a cop; executed by lethal injection.
- Andrew Grant DeYoung (1974–2011), convicted of murdering his parents and sister; executed by lethal injection.
- Ellis Wayne Felker (1948–1996), convicted of rape and murder; executed by electric chair.
- Melbert Ford (1960–2010), double murderer; executed by lethal injection.
- Kelly Gissendaner (1968–2015), murdered her husband; executed by lethal injection.
- William Henry Hance (1951–1994), serial killer; executed by electric chair.
- Nicholas Ingram (1963–1995), murderer; executed by electric chair.
- Carl Isaacs (1953–2003), mass killer, one of four participants in the Alday family murders; executed by lethal injection.
- Brandon Astor Jones (1943–2016), murderer; executed by lethal injection.
- William Earl Lynd (1955–2008), murdered his girlfriend; executed by lethal injection.
- Warren McCleskey (1945–1991), convicted of murdering a police officer; subject of 1987 U.S. Supreme Court case McCleskey v. Kemp; executed by electric chair.
- Timothy McCorquodale (1952–1987), convicted of rape and murder; executed by electric chair.
- Stephen Anthony Mobley (1965–2005), murdered a college student; executed by lethal injection.
- Curtis Osborne (1970–2008), double murderer; executed by lethal injection.
- Willie James Pye (1965–2024), convicted rapist-killer; executed by lethal injection.
- Brandon Rhode (1979–2010) and Daniel Lucas (1978–2016), convicted of killing the Moss family; executed by lethal injection.
- John Eldon Smith (1930–1983), double murderer; executed by electric chair.
