= Malice murder =

Criminal offence in Georgia, USA, of a homicide committed with malice

Malice murder is a criminal offense in the U.S. state of Georgia, committed when a homicide is done with express or implied malice.

== Definition ==
According to Georgia law, express malice is "that deliberate intention unlawfully to take the life of another human being which is manifested by external circumstances capable of proof." Malice is implied when "no considerable provocation appears and where all the circumstances of the killing show an abandoned and malignant heart [AMH]." The offense is similar to first-degree murder in other states.

== Notable examples ==
- Melody Walker Farris was convicted of malice murder on November 4, 2024 for the 2018 murder of her husband, Gary Wayne Farris. State vs. Melody Walker Farris
- Kelly Gissendaner was found guilty of malice murder in 1998 and executed in 2015.
- Members of the FEAR terrorist group were charged with malice murder in 2012.
- Alberto Martinez was convicted of malice murder in 2004 in the murder of Richard T. Davis.
- Stephen Anthony Mobley was convicted of both malice murder and felony murder. He was executed in 2005.
- Justin Ross Harris of Marietta, Georgia, was convicted in November 2016 of malice murder and felony murder in the June 2014 death of his 22-month-old son, Cooper. In June 2022, his murder convictions were overturned. He was subsequently exonerated of the charges in May 2023.
- Robert Aaron Long pleaded guilty to four counts of malice murder and felony murder in four of the deaths in the 2021 Atlanta spa shootings, and is facing four more counts of malice murder and felony murder in the other four deaths.
- Travis McMichael of Brunswick, Georgia, was convicted in November 2021 of malice murder in the February 2020 murder of Ahmaud Arbery.
- In early February 2021, rapper Silentó was arrested on charges of malice murder and felony murder.
- Tiffany Nicole Moss was convicted in 2019 of malice murder in the 2013 murder of her 10-year old step-daughter, Emani Moss. Tiffany was subsequently sentenced to death.
- Robert Dale Conklin was put to death via lethal injection in 2005 for the 1984 malice murder and dismemberment of his homosexual lover and lawyer George Grant Crooks.
- In 2024, José Antonio Ibarra was sentenced to life imprisonment without the possibility of parole for the felony murder and malice murder of 22-year-old nursing student Laken Riley in Athens, Georgia.
- In September 1999, Jerry Heidler was found guilty of malice murder and sentenced to death for killing four members of the Daniels family in 1997.
- On July 28, 2026, Colt Gray was sentenced to life in prison without the possibility of parole on each of the four counts of malice murder that he was convicted of in connection with the 2024 Apalachee High School shooting.
- Willie Pye was executed in March 2024 for the kidnapping, rape and malice murder of Alicia Lynn Yarbrough.
- Virgil Delano Presnell Jr., the longest-serving death row inmate in Georgia, was sentenced to death for the malice murder of Lori Smith in 1976.
- Darryl Scott Stinski and Dorian Frank O'Kelley, both convicted of the malice murders of Susan and Kimberly Pittman and sentenced to death.
- Stacey Humphreys, who was found guilty of double malice murder charges for robbing and fatally shooting two real estate agents, 33-year-old Cyndi Williams and 21-year-old Lori Brown, in 2003.

== See also ==
- Murder in Georgia law
