= Georgia State Board of Pardons and Paroles =

Executive agency of the U.S. state of Georgia

Agency overview
- Formed: August 3, 1943; 83 years ago
- Jurisdiction: Georgia
- Headquarters: 2 Martin Luther King, Jr. Drive SE; Suite 430, Balcony Level, West Tower; Atlanta, Georgia 30334
- Agency executives: Joyette Holmes, Chair; Wayne V. Bennett, Vice Chair
- Parent agency: Executive branch of Georgia
- Website: pap.georgia.gov

The Georgia State Board of Pardons and Paroles is a five-member panel empowered to grant paroles, pardons, reprieves, remissions, commutations, and to remove civil and political disabilities imposed by law. Created by a constitutional amendment ratified in August 1943, it is part of the executive branch of Georgia's government. Members are appointed by the governor to staggered, renewable seven-year terms subject to confirmation by the State Senate; the board originally had three members until a 1973 constitutional amendment expanded it to its present size of five.

Each year, the board elects one of its members to serve as chair. As of 2026, the chair is Joyette Holmes, the vice chair is Wayne V. Bennett, and the other members are Robert Markley, Kimberly McCoy, and Josh Waters.

== Parole and clemency ==
The Board is the primary authority in Georgia assigned the power to grant pardons, paroles, and other forms of clemency. Parole is the discretionary decision of the Board to release a certain offender from confinement after the offender has served an appropriate portion of a prison sentence. Persons on parole remain under state supervision and control according to conditions that, if violated, allow for re-imprisonment.

Georgia is one of only nine states in the United States with a Board of Pardons and Paroles that exclusively grants all state pardons. Alabama (Board of Pardons and Paroles), Connecticut (Board of Pardons and Paroles), Idaho (Commission of Pardons and Paroles), Minnesota (Board of Pardons), Nebraska (Board of Pardons), Nevada (Board of Pardon Commissioners), South Carolina (Board of Probation, Parole, and Pardon), and Utah (Board of Pardons and Parole) are the other eight states in the United States with similar state boards.

Clemency is given by the board at its discretion. The Board has the sole constitutional authority to commute death sentences to either life imprisonment or life without parole. Georgia is one of the four states (Georgia, Nebraska, Nevada, Utah) whose governor does not have the authority to grant clemency, although the governor retains indirect influence by virtue of his power to appoint board members. Prior to the board's establishment, Georgia governors did have this power; Eugene Talmadge used it to release George Harsh in 1940. Harsh went on to combat service in the RCAF, before being taken prisoner and assisting in the "Great Escape".

== Troy Davis case ==
The Board is, on occasion, the subject of media attention when it reviews high-profile cases. One such occasion was the review of the case of Troy Anthony Davis, an African-American man convicted in 1991 of murdering police officer Mark MacPhail in Savannah, Georgia.

The Board stayed Davis's scheduled July 17 execution but refused to postpone it further. The Supreme Court of the United States convened a hearing on whether to issue a stay, deciding in favor, just two hours before the planned execution. However, on appeal, the Supreme Court denied certiorari and allowed the State of Georgia to acquire a new execution warrant for Davis with an execution date of October 27, 2008.

On October 24, 2008, the United States Court of Appeals for the Eleventh Circuit issued a stay of execution, pending a decision on Davis's federal habeas corpus petition. This stay was later overturned.

In an August 2010 decision, the conviction was upheld. The court described defense efforts to upset the conviction as "largely smoke and mirrors" and found that several of the proffered affidavits were not recantations at all. Subsequent appeals, including to the Supreme Court, were rejected, and a fourth execution date was set for September 21, 2011. Nearly one million people signed petitions urging the Georgia State Board of Pardons and Paroles to grant clemency.

The Board denied clemency and, on September 21, it refused to reconsider its decision. After a last-minute appeal to the United States Supreme Court was denied, the sentence was carried out through lethal injection on September 21, 2011.

== Criticism ==
The Fairness for Prisoners' Families organization has criticized the Board and other Georgia authorities, noting, however, that the issues they highlight may not always be intentional.

In their 2012 report to the Georgia Criminal Justice Reform Council, the Southern Center for Human Rights (SCHR) noted the conviction of former Chairman of the Georgia State Board of Pardons and Paroles Bobby Whitworth, who during the 2000 General Assembly session in Georgia accepted a $75,000 bribe from Detention Management Services, Inc. for influencing the passing of Senate Bill 474. This private probation legislation would have "effectively transferred supervision of approximately 25,000 misdemeanors from the State Department of Corrections to the individual counties." Private probation firms like DMS would have benefited greatly from potential individual county contracts. When Sentinel acquired Detention Management Services, Inc., their books showed the $75,000 as a lobbyist payment for passage of the legislation. The bill was withdrawn.

== See also ==
- Supreme Court of Georgia
- Georgia Department of Corrections
