= Eugene Broxton =

American murderer and suspected serial killer

- Born: Eugene Alvin Broxton; February 27, 1955 (age 71); Louisiana, U.S.
- Convictions: Capital murder Aggravated robbery Attemped capital murder
- Penalty: Death

Details
- Victims: 1–5
- Span of crimes: June 1986 – May 1991
- Country: United States
- State: Texas
- Date apprehended: May 18, 1991
- Imprisoned at: Allan B. Polunsky Unit, West Livingston, Texas

Eugene Alvin Broxton (born February 27, 1955) is an American murderer and suspected serial killer. Convicted and sentenced to death for the May 1991 murder of a woman in Channelview, Texas, Broxton is also the sole suspect in four other murders for which he has never been convicted but remains the sole suspect.

== Crimes ==
With an extensive criminal record in both his native Louisiana and Texas, Broxton's first major crime occurred on June 3, 1986, when he fired two shots at Pasadena police officer Walt Hays while fleeing from a robbery. Hays survived and then arrested his assailant in an apartment complex shortly afterward. For this, Broxton was convicted on charges of aggravated robbery and attempted murder, for which he was given a 13-year sentence. He was paroled in 1990.

After his release, Broxton began using drugs, developing a heavy drug addiction that drove him to rob and sometimes kill his prospective victims. On April 6, 1991, he broke into the northeastern Houston apartment of 46-year-old Gary Wayne Stuckwisch, whom he stabbed to death. After stealing all of the man's valuables, Broxton stole his car but abandoned it the very next day. Thirteen days later, Broxton abducted 59-year-old TV guide salesman Gordon John Miller in an area between Federal Road and the I-10. In front of witnesses, Broxton stabbed Miller to death before fleeing in his truck. Five days later, he attempted to attack a man named Elbert Madden, who survived the assault.

On May 2, Broxton was arrested in Pasadena for stealing a $20 radio from a Walmart in east Houston. While this was considered a violation of his parole that should've sent him to prison, Broxton was instead fined and released due to the crime being considered a petty offense, prison overcrowding, and investigators' inability to locate his parole officer at the time. Four days later, Broxton broke into the home of 64-year-old one-legged retiree Albert Krigger, whom he strangled to death before allegedly pawning a diamond ring belonging to the victim. On May 10, Broxton returned to the same Walmart he had been arrested for stealing the radio and proceeded to abduct 65-year-old Gary Leon Andrews at gunpoint. He then drove with Andrews to a remote area, where, after robbing Andrews, he shot him in the mouth and stabbed him in the stomach. Despite his serious injuries, Andrews survived the ordeal.

On May 16, Broxton traveled to Channelview, spotting the motel room where two newlyweds from Louisiana, 23-year-old Waylon and 20-year-old Sheila Dockens, were residing. Posing as a motel employee, Broxton was allowed access into the room, after which he bound, gagged, pistol-whipped, and then shot them with his .44 Magnum before stealing $800 and leaving them for dead. Sheila, who had injuries to the chest and arms, died; Waylon, who was shot in the head, survived.

Broxton is also suspected to have murdered 42-year-old Larry Smith during the Channelview crime spree.

== Arrest, trials and appeals ==
Two days after his attack on the Dockens couple, Broxton was arrested by police officers in Houston, who had been looking for him after they had found his fingerprints in the apartment and car of Stuckwisch. He was charged with three capital murders and two attempted capital murders, and put before a jury trial in Harris County. Waylon Dockens, who by this point still had a bullet lodged in his neck, testified at his trial, positively identifying him as the man who had attacked him and killed his wife. The following year, Broxton was found guilty of the Dockens murder and sentenced to death following a two-hour deliberation by the jury. The charges in the other murders were dropped, and since Broxton was given the death sentence, prosecutors indicated they wouldn't try him for the rest.

Over the following years, Broxton unsuccessfully tried to appeal his convictions to the Court of Criminal Appeals on several occasions, arguing under the double jeopardy clause that juries shouldn't have been notified of his other suspected murders by the prosecutors at the hearings for the Dockens killing. His requests were denied multiple times until 2000, when a Harris County federal judge ruled that race-based testimony should be considered inadmissible. As the attorney general presiding over his original 1992 trial, John Comyn, had allowed a psychologist who claimed that race should play a factor in sentencing testify, the Supreme Court of Texas ruled that Broxton, along with four other convicts, should be granted new hearings. In 2003, Broxton was brought before a new jury trial but was found guilty and resentenced to death a second time.

== Status ==
As of February 2024, Eugene Broxton remains on death row at the Allan B. Polunsky Unit, awaiting execution.

== See also ==
- List of death row inmates in the United States
- List of serial killers in the United States
