= 2002 East End murders =

Murder of three female in Houston, Texas

In 2002, a crime spree involving the murders of two women and one teenage girl occurred in the East End area of Houston, Texas. The three perpetrators were two adult men and one teenage boy: Edgardo Rafael Cubas Matamoros (born February 7, 1979), a Honduran citizen; Walter Alexander Sorto (born August 10, 1977), a Salvadoran citizen; and Eduardo Navarro, a 15-year-old boy at the time of the crimes.

All three victims were shot to death. The first victim was sophomore high-school student Esmeralda Alvarado. The other two victims were waitresses, 24-year old Roxana Aracelie Capulin and 38-year old Maria Moreno Rangel. Capulin was Salvadoran in descent.

== Crimes ==
One victim, 15-year old Esmeralda Alvarado, was a 10th grade (sophomore) student at Lamar High School. Alvarado, a Hispanic girl, resided in the East End. On January 18, 2002, she disappeared after leaving her boyfriend's house. Alvarado was kidnapped, raped, and murdered by the three perpetrators; she was shot in the head. Her body was placed in a field, in an industrial zone on the block of 18000 Market Street. Her body was discovered on Tuesday January 22, 2002.

The other murder victims, 24-year old Roxana Aracelie Capulin and 38-year old Maria Moreno Rangel, were waitresses, employed at the El Mirador restaurant, an East End establishment acquired by Capulin's family in 1994. Capulin's family had immigrated from El Salvador. On May 31, 2002, the two women disappeared and on July 1, their corpses were found in Capulin's vehicle. They had been shot to death and had their eyes and mouths covered with tape.

== Perpetrators ==
Cubas, an illegal immigrant, originated from the San Miguel neighborhood of Tegucigalpa, Honduras and worked at a shopping center in the Comayagüela area. He left his hometown in 2000. Cubas had a common law wife from Houston, and his father was also resident in Houston. Cubas supported himself by cleaning offices and installing insulation. He did not previously have a criminal record.

Sorto, also an illegal immigrant, had been convicted of unlawfully carrying a weapon in 1999 and for committing aggravated robbery with a deadly weapon. He received a 10-day jail sentence for the former, and for the latter, he received a sentence of probation for ten years in December 2000. Sorto was married and had children.

The teenage boy was enrolled in Daniel Ortiz Jr. Middle School as an 8th grader before his arrest.

== Trial and punishment ==
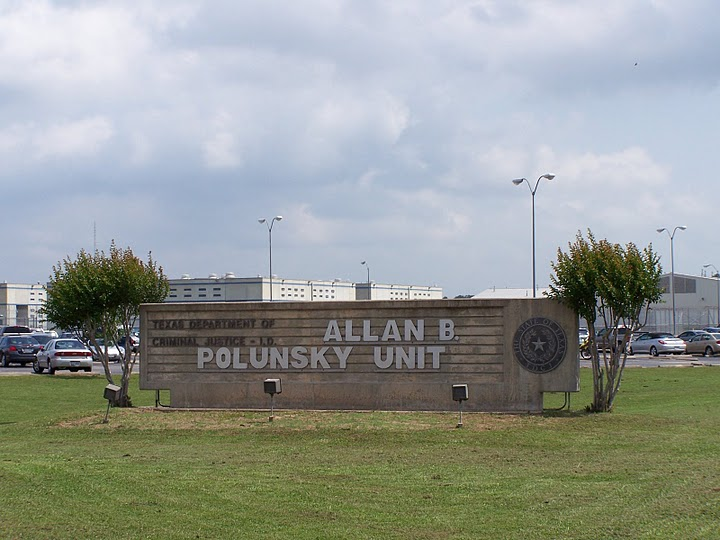
The adult perpetrators are housed in the Polunsky Unit

Sorto entered a police station in an attempt to claim a reward for solving the crimes. He confessed to committing crimes after his arrest. On the day of Sorto's arrest, the teenage boy was arrested at his residence. Cubas was arrested while on the job at a construction site in Tomball, Texas. Gilberto Villarreal, one of Cubas's lawyers, stated that in addition to Alvarado, Cubas also confessed to killing Capulin.

Prosecutors sought the death penalty for Sorto and Cubas. Navarro was under 18 years of age at the time of the crimes and therefore was ineligible for the death penalty. Navarro served as the getaway driver during the deaths of Capulin and Rangel. He was to be tried as an adult. In 2004, Navarro pleaded guilty to aggravated robbery in a plea agreement and was sentenced to 13 years in prison.

In November 2003, Sorto was sentenced to death for the murders of Capulin and Rangel.

Frances "Poppy" Northcutt and Villarreal were Cubas's defense attorneys. During his trial, seven of Cubas's relatives traveled to Houston to provide testimony; they were residents of Honduras. Cubas was convicted of the capital murder of Alvarado on May 10, 2004. He was sentenced to death on May 22, 2004, after the jury deliberated for two and one-half hours.

Sorto and Cubas are both housed in the death row section of Polunsky Unit in West Livingston.

Cubas's execution was originally scheduled for January 16, 2014, but the execution date was rescinded.
