= Charles Victor Thompson =

Executed American convicted murderer (1970–2026)

- Undated mugshot
- Born: June 13, 1970; Harris County, Texas, U.S.
- Died: January 28, 2026 (aged 55); Huntsville Unit, Texas, U.S
- Spouse: Petra Thompson (m. 2011; div. 2017)
- Status: Executed by lethal injection
- Conviction: Capital murder
- Penalty: Death (April 14, 1999)

Details
- Victims: Glenda Dennise Hayslip; Darren Keith Cain
- Date: April 30, 1998
- Country: United States
- State: Texas
- Location: Houston

Charles Victor Thompson (June 13, 1970 – January 28, 2026) was an American convicted double murderer who was sentenced to death in April 1999 for the murder of his former girlfriend, Glenda Dennise Hayslip and her new boyfriend, Darren Keith Cain, on April 30, 1998 in the Houston suburb of Tomball. Thompson was executed on January 28, 2026.

Thompson's case gained nationwide attention following a November 2005 jail escape, launching a manhunt that lasted three days; Thompson is, so far, the only death row inmate to have successfully escaped an American correctional facility in the 21st century.

== Murders ==
On the evening of April 29, 1998, police were summoned to Hayslip's apartment regarding a domestic disturbance involving Thompson and Cain, who was Hayslip's current love interest. Officers escorted Thompson from the premises, but he returned approximately three hours later, in the early morning of April 30, with a firearm.

Thompson gained entry to the residence by kicking in the front door, at which point he confronted Cain and Hayslip. Forensic evidence and witness statements established that Thompson fired four rounds into Cain's neck and chest, resulting in immediate fatal trauma. Following the incapacitation of Cain, Thompson focused his attention on Hayslip. After reloading the weapon, he reportedly uttered a disparaging remark—"I can shoot you too, bitch", before discharging a round into her face. The projectile entered through her cheek, causing catastrophic internal damage that included the destruction of her dentures and the near-total severance of her tongue. Despite these severe injuries, Hayslip survived the initial trauma and was transported via Life Flight to a hospital, where she underwent emergency surgery, was taken off life support days later and then died.

After the shootings, Thompson disposed of the murder weapon in a nearby creek. He then traveled to the residence of a confidante, Diane Zernia, to whom he described the shootings in detail. Following this confession, Thompson contacted his father, who facilitated his surrender to the authorities later that morning.

== Capital murder trial ==
Following his arrest, Thompson stood trial in Harris County in 1999 on charges of capital murder. The death penalty was requested by the prosecution throughout his trial.

To secure a death sentence, the State was required to prove Thompson's "future dangerousness". To this end, the prosecution introduced evidence of a solicitation-to-murder plot that Thompson had initiated while in pretrial detention at the Harris County Jail. While Thompson was in jail awaiting trial, he approached inmates Reid and Humphrey to arrange the murder of Diane Zernia, whom he correctly identified as the only witness capable of linking him to the homicides. Law enforcement, tipped off by Reid, orchestrated an undercover operation where Investigator Gary Johnson posed as a hitman. Johnson met with Thompson in a visiting booth and wore a wire to record their conversation. During this meeting, Thompson offered Johnson $1,500 to retrieve the murder weapon from Cypress Creek and to murder Zernia. Thompson displayed a hand-drawn map against the glass of the visitor's booth depicting Zernia's address and the weapon's location and provided detailed descriptions of Zernia's family and vehicles to facilitate the hit.

The central legal contest during the guilt phase focused on the cause of Hayslip's death. While Cain had died instantly, Hayslip survived the initial trauma and was transported via Life Flight to Hermann Hospital. At the hospital, emergency responders and surgeons encountered significant difficulties securing an airway due to the swelling of her tongue and the internal damage caused by the bullet. The defense called Pat Radalat as an expert witness. Radalat opined that Hayslip's death was not the direct result of the gunshot, but rather the result of medical negligence during her hospitalization. Radalat testified that the medical team failed to correctly place a nasotracheal tube and then failed to monitor her breathing, allowing her to fall into a coma due to bradycardia. Thompson argued that the decision by Hayslip's family to remove her from life support one week after the shooting constituted an intervening cause that absolved him of criminal responsibility for her death.

The prosecution countered this argument by relying on the testimony of the medical examiner, Paul Shrode, and the doctor in charge of Hayslip's care. They testified that the gunshot wound to the face, which nearly severed her tongue, created a life-threatening emergency. The tongue's high vascularity meant that Hayslip was at imminent risk of bleeding to death or drowning in her own blood. On cross-examination, Radalat was forced to concede that Hayslip "probably" would have died without any medical intervention. Under Texas Penal Code Section 6.04, a person is criminally responsible if the result would not have occurred but for their conduct, unless the concurrent cause was clearly sufficient to produce the result and the conduct of the actor was clearly insufficient. The jury found that Thompson's actions were the primary cause of death and convicted him of capital murder and sentenced him to death on April 14, 1999.

=== 2005 retrial ===
Thompson's case returned to trial for a punishment phase rehearing with the State seeking to re-establish Thompson's future dangerousness without the Gary Johnson evidence. Prosecutor Vic Wisner argued that the double homicide was a "crime of revenge, hatred and spite". To provide evidence of Thompson's violent tendencies, the State called a different jailhouse informant: Robin Rhodes. Rhodes testified that while he was detained with Thompson in August 1998, Thompson had solicited him to murder a "hit list" of potential State witnesses. Rhodes claimed that no one from the State had directed him to obtain information; he simply "saw an opportunity and seized it". The list provided by Thompson included Zernia and other witnesses, with instructions to "either kill them or persuade them not to be there".

The defense, led by Terry Gaiser, characterized the killings as a "crime of passion" and challenged the reliability of Rhodes. It was revealed during the trial that Rhodes was a "full-time informant" for Harris County law enforcement, having worked as a confidential informant in over 50 cases. Rhodes testified that in a 1999 drug case against his own fiancée, he had said that approximately 80 percent of the cases he participated in resulted in arrest and conviction. Despite these revelations, the court permitted the testimony, and on October 28, 2005, a new jury again sentenced Thompson to death.

== 2005 jail escape ==
Following his second death sentence, Thompson was held in the Harris County Jail pending transfer to the Polunsky Unit in Livingston. On November 3, 2005, he executed a brazen escape that exposed systemic negligence within the facility. Thompson had smuggled several items into his cell using a legal binder, which inmates are permitted to keep. These items included a handcuff key, a fake identification badge, and a set of civilian clothes consisting of khaki pants, a dark blue shirt, and white tennis shoes. Thompson later claimed that a sergeant had found a previous set of smuggled clothes but had merely confiscated them as contraband without reporting the incident to the district attorney's office.

On the afternoon of November 3, Thompson was taken to a visitors' room for what he claimed was a meeting with his attorney. Once alone, he slipped out of his handcuffs and changed out of his orange prison jumpsuit and into the smuggled civilian attire. Thompson then walked toward the exit, flashing his fake ID badge—which claimed he was a state investigator with the Attorney General's office—to at least four jail employees. He bluffed his way past the final guards at the front door by walking calmly.

Thompson's journey took him on a freight train to East Texas, where he stayed in an open boxcar, describing the experience as an "adventure" where he felt "dirty and happy". He eventually reached Shreveport, Louisiana, where he stole a bicycle and used money obtained from "Good Samaritans" by posing as a Hurricane Katrina evacuee. His escape ended at a pay phone outside a Shreveport liquor store. On November 6, 2005, acting on a tip, police found Thompson intoxicated while he was attempting to call friends overseas to arrange a wire transfer for a planned flight to Canada. Following his capture, Thompson was extradited to Texas.

== Thompson's appeals ==
On October 24, 2001, the Texas Court of Criminal Appeals reversed Johnson's death sentence on direct appeal based on a Sixth Amendment violation related to improper evidence at the punishment phase.

On April 9, 2003, the Texas Court of Criminal Appeals withdrew an originally granted rehearing order reviewing of guilt phase issues.

On October 31, 2007, the Texas Court of Criminal Appeals affirmed the second death sentence on direct appeal.

On October 6, 2008, the U.S Supreme Court denied Thompson's appeal for certiorari.

On April 17, 2013, the Texas Court of Criminal Appeals denied Thompson's first state habeas corpus application. On March 9, 2016, Thompson's second habeas corpus appeal was denied.

On March 23, 2017, the U.S. District Court for the Southern District of Texas denies Thompson's federal habeas petition.

On February 18, 2019, the 5th Circuit Court of Appeals granted Thompson's request for certificate of appealability on a specific claim and hears Thompson's appeal of the federal habeas denial. On October 29, 2019, the 5th Circuit Court affirmed the district court's decision. On May 7, 2020, the 5th Circuit Court denied a request for a rehearing.

On March 22, 2021, the U.S. Supreme Court denied certiorari on the federal habeas appeal.

== Imprisonment and execution ==
=== Imprisonment ===
While incarcerated in 2011, Thompson married a German woman seven years his senior named Petra. The couple met through a Write-A-Prisoner penpal program. They never touched each other.

The pair separated in 2014 and ultimately divorced in 2017 after Thompson continuously made financial demands to his wife, pressuring her for money to pay legal fees and emotionally abusing and insulting her in their correspondences. By the time of their separation in 2014, Petra had indebted herself and spent €50,000 ($65,000) to support Thompson.

=== Death warrant ===
After exhausting his appeals, Thompson received his death warrant on September 11, 2025, scheduling him to be executed by lethal injection at the Huntsville Unit on January 28, 2026. In an October 2025 interview, he stressed that he would continue to fight his death sentence, though he acknowledged that a stay was unlikely.

=== Execution ===
Thompson, aged 55, was executed by lethal injection at the Huntsville Unit on January 28, 2026. He was pronounced dead at 6:50 p.m CT. In his final words, Thompson apologized to the victims' families and asked for forgiveness. He went on to say that there were no winners and that the execution would create more trauma and victims after 28 years.

== Media ==
In 2008, a biography by Roger Rodriguez was released titled The Grass Beneath His Feet: The Charles Victor Thompson Story. In it, Rodriguez highlights the details regarding his escape, but he does not reveal how Thompson received a handcuff key.

Thompson is featured in the fifth episode of the first season of the Netflix series I Am a Killer.

Thompson was also featured in an episode of "Extreme Prison Breaks", entitled "Runaway Chuck", which first aired on the Documentary Channel on August 15, 2012.

In 2025, Thompson was featured on the British Channel 5 program "Dead Man Walking: Dan Walker on Death Row".

== See also ==
- Martin Gurule, last death row inmate to escape from prison in the United States
- List of people executed in the United States in 2026
- List of people executed in Texas, 2020–present
- List of most recent executions by jurisdiction

Executions carried out in Texas
Preceded by Blaine Milam September 25, 2025	Charles Victor Thompson; January 28, 2026	Succeeded by Cedric Allen Ricks March 11, 2026
Executions carried out in the United States
Preceded by Frank A. Walls – Florida December 18, 2025	Charles Victor Thompson – Texas; January 28, 2026	Succeeded by Ronald Heath – Florida February 10, 2026
