= René García =

René García may refer to:

- René García (footballer, born 1961), Mexican football manager and former striker
- René García (politician) (born 1974), American politician
- Rene Garcia (murderer), American convicted murderer
