= Kaufman County murders =

2013 crime in the United States

- Date: January 31 and March 30, 2013
- Location: Kaufman and Talty, Texas
- Type: Shooting, assassination
- Motive: Revenge
- Target: Kaufman County District Attorney’s office employees
- Perpetrator: Eric Lyle Williams
- Deaths: 3
- Convicted: Kim Williams
- Convictions: Capital murder (2 counts) (Eric); Murder (1 count) (Kim)
- Sentence: Death (Eric); 40 years (Kim)

In 2013, two prosecutors and a prosecutor's wife were murdered in Kaufman County, Texas. The case gained national attention in the United States due to speculation that the Aryan Brotherhood prison gang was responsible, but this was later found to be untrue. Eric Lyle Williams (born April 7, 1967), a former lawyer and justice of the peace whose theft case was prosecuted by two of the victims, was tried, found guilty, and sentenced to death for two of the murders. He was also charged with the murder of prosecutor Mark Hasse, but a decision was made not to prosecute him as he had already received a death sentence for the other murders. His wife, Kimberly Irene "Kim" Williams, was tried separately, and sentenced to 40 years in prison.

== Timeline ==
=== Hasse murder ===
On January 31, 2013, Mark Hasse was shot and killed while walking in the 100 block of East Grove Street in Kaufman, Texas. Hasse was the chief assistant district attorney for the Kaufman County Criminal District Attorney's Office. He was walking from his car to the courthouse when a gunman shot him repeatedly and then fled the area in a waiting car. Hasse, 57, had been an attorney for many years, and had previously served as an assistant district attorney in Dallas County under District Attorney Henry Wade. He had worked for Kaufman County since 2010 as a prosecutor, and was also a licensed police officer commissioned with the district attorney's office.

A large manhunt was conducted by law-enforcement agencies, including the Kaufman Police Department, the Kaufman County Sheriff, several Kaufman County Constable's Offices, the Texas Department of Public Safety, the Federal Bureau of Investigation, the Bureau of Alcohol, Tobacco, Firearms and Explosives, the United States Marshals Service, and the Drug Enforcement Administration. During the course of the investigation, a number of leads were followed and news of the investigation captured headlines across the nation. Most hypotheses involved allegations that the Aryan Brotherhood, a Neo-Nazi prison gang, had been responsible for the murder; they were later found to be untrue. The speculation was made by other Kaufman defense attorneys acquainted with Hasse, who knew that Hasse “dealt with cases involving methamphetamine in the county involving gangs and white supremacist groups.”

=== McLelland murders ===
On March 30, 2013, the bodies of Kaufman County Criminal District Attorney Michael McLelland, 63, and his wife, Cynthia (Woodward) McLelland, 65, were found in their home located in Talty in rural Kaufman County. The murdered couple was discovered by Dallas police officer C.J. Tomlinson and his step-father Skeet Phillips who were both family friends of the McLellands. The duo entered the home to check on the couple after a family member was unable to contact them; Tomlinson's mother had called him after her phone calls to both McLellands, trying to arrange a time to drop off vegetables for a dinner Cynthia McLelland was preparing for the Phillips family, had gone unanswered. Tomlinson found the front door closed but unlocked — unusual in a situation in which McLelland had, like his colleagues, been particularly alert to personal safety since the Hasse murder — and noticed shell casings on the entryway floor as he carefully opened the door. Both victims had been shot and killed in what was described as a home invasion-type assault on their property.

McLelland had been elected to his office in 2010 and was widely viewed as an excellent replacement for the previous district attorney, who had been arrested for driving under the influence while in office. Mike McLelland was an officer in the U.S. Army Reserve for 23 years, and worked as a clinical psychologist before pursuing a legal career. Cynthia McLelland worked as a clinical psychologist for many years before becoming a psychiatric nurse at Terrell State Hospital.

Following the McLelland murders, numerous elected officials in the county were placed under protection by law-enforcement officers at home and at work. Security was visibly increased at the Kaufman County Courthouse.

== Arrests and trial ==
On April 18, 2013, Eric Lyle Williams and his wife, Kim, were arrested for all three murders. Eric Williams, a former attorney and justice of the peace for Kaufman County, had been convicted of burglary and theft while in office and was the only person prosecuted by both McLelland and Hasse. Williams was out of jail on probation at the time of the murders.

The trial was moved out of Kaufman County as Williams' defense lawyers cited media coverage and its interference with a fair trial as reasons for change of venue. Kim Williams was held at the Kaufman County Law Enforcement Center in lieu of a $10 million bond. Williams' license to practice law, which had been suspended on October 10, 2012, was permanently revoked when he was disbarred on February 3, 2014.

Eric Williams was found guilty of capital murder at his trial in Rockwall County on December 4, 2014. He was sentenced on December 17, 2014, to die by lethal injection. The U.S. Supreme Court denied an appeal from Williams on May 14, 2018. Williams filed a new appeal in August 2019. As of October 2021, Eric Lyle Williams is incarcerated in the Polunsky Unit of the Texas Department of Criminal Justice (TDCJ) and is awaiting execution. Online TDCJ Inmate records show he was still there in early 2025.

Kim Williams, after testifying against her husband in his trial, pleaded guilty to her role in planning and performing the murders, on December 30, 2014, and was sentenced to 40 years in prison.

== Media coverage ==
In March 2018, HarperCollins published a book on the cases written by journalist Kathryn Casey, In Plain Sight: The Kaufman County Prosecutor Murders. The first journalist to go inside the prisons to interview Eric and Kim Williams, Casey conducted extensive interviews over a two-year period with both the convicted killers. During those sessions, Eric Williams denied any involvement in the killings and professed his innocence. In contrast, Kim Williams described in detail the events leading up to the murders and recounted the days of the killings. She claimed to regret her actions and acknowledged that she could have stopped her husband by contacting authorities before any of the victims died. Kim Williams filed for divorce while in prison, and it became final in January 2018.

On March 6, 2022, the case was profiled on Forensic Files II in an episode titled "Marked for Murder." On June 9, 2023, the case aired on NBC's Dateline titled "Bad Intentions."
