= Martin Gurule =

American prisoner

Martin Edward Gurule
- Born: November 7, 1969; Corpus Christi, Texas U.S.
- Died: November 27, 1998 (aged 29); Huntsville, Texas, U.S.
- Cause of death: Drowning
- Conviction: Capital murder
- Penalty: Death

Details
- Date: October 12, 1992
- Location: Corpus Christi, Texas
- Killed: Mike Piperis, 46; Anthony Staton, 31

Martin Edward Gurule (November 7, 1969 – November 27, 1998) was an American prisoner who successfully escaped from death row in Texas in 1998. It was the first successful breakout from Texas death row since Raymond Hamilton was broken out by Bonnie and Clyde on January 16, 1934. This is the most recent instance of a prisoner escaping from death row in the United States. Another death row inmate, Charles Victor Thompson, escaped from custody in Texas 2005, but he was being held at the county jail after a resentencing hearing.

== Life ==
Martin Gurule was raised by his father and grandmother. His mother died shortly before his first birthday. He attended W. B. Ray High School in Corpus Christi and cared for intellectually disabled patients at Corpus Christi State School, an institution run by the Texas Department of Mental Health and Mental Retardation. His 23-year-old girlfriend, Malisa Smith, worked on the checkout at the U & I restaurant in Corpus Christi.

== Crimes ==
On October 12, 1992, Gurule entered U & I late at night and fatally shot restaurant co-owner Mike Piperis and employee Anthony Staton. Gurule claimed that Piperis had ordered him to come to the restaurant that night because Piperis wanted to discuss an accusation from Gurule of Piperis committing tax evasion. Then, Gurule claimed, Piperis attacked him and Gurule used his firearm in self-defense.

Investigators contradicted Gurule's version of events. They alleged that Staton was sitting on a chair when he was shot in the back of the head. Piperis was found kneeling against a chair in front of an open safe, and had also been shot in the back of the head. It was also discovered that Gurule's girlfriend, Malisa Smith, had been fired from her job at the restaurant in the week before the killings after $350 turned up missing from her cash register. The prosecution argued that Gurule and Smith had jointly planned to rob the restaurant. Gurule had cut the phone lines and stole $9,000 from the safe.

At the sentencing phase, the prosecution said that Gurule had convictions dating back to 1986 for credit card fraud, theft and two bank robberies. He also had a pending assault charge against him. Nueces County District Attorney Carlos Valdéz called the killings a "crime that had had been building up over several years".

In July 1993, Gurule was convicted of capital murder and sentenced to death, while Smith was convicted of two counts of non-capital murder sentenced to 25 years in prison. She would be paroled in 2005. Gurule was transferred to the Ellis Unit in an unincorporated area of Walker County. It is the only unit in Texas that has death row for male inmates. Gurule was selected for the Work Capable Program, together with around 150 other death row inmates. This was a trial program that allowed selected death row inmates to move relatively freely outside their cells, to have contact with other, non-death row inmates, and to carry out supervised work within the prison. His appeal against his death sentence was denied a year before his escape.

== Escape ==
During a Thanksgiving dinner on November 26, 1998, Gurule and six other death row inmates hid in a recreation room. Prior to leaving their cells for dinner, they had placed cushions and sheets in their beds in such a way that the guards would not suspect anything was amiss. They also darkened their prison uniforms with marker pens so that they would be less visible at night. After the cells were locked for the night, they broke through a door to the recreational yard and then through a separating fence. Once they reached the main prison yard, they scaled the roof of a building and waited for complete darkness.

Shortly after midnight, guards at a post spotted the escapees climbing, immediately raising the alarm and opening fire. At this point, all six of Gurule's co-escapees surrendered, but Gurule ran approximately 100 ft over an open piece of land, scaled a barbed-wire fence, ran another 70 ft across a clearing, scaled a second barbed-wire fence and disappeared into the darkness outside the prison boundary, despite the guards having fired 18 shots at him.

More than 500 officers from surrounding towns, cities and counties took part in the manhunt, which was supported by sniffer dogs, boats and helicopters. Governor George W. Bush additionally called in the Texas Rangers and announced a 5,000-dollar reward for information leading to Gurule's capture.

Seven days later, two fishermen found Gurule's body in a tributary of the Trinity River near Huntsville. Gurule was wearing several layers of clothing and rolled up newspapers and cardboard to protect himself while scaling the prison's barbed-wire fences. The autopsy revealed that he had sustained a gunshot wound in the back, causing him to drown in the river. His time of death was backdated to November 27, meaning that he died on the night of his escape. Investigators believe that he jumped into the river to remove traces that could allow sniffer dogs to locate him, and then drowned due to the severity of his gunshot wound preventing him from being able to get out of the river.

As a direct result of Gurule's escape, the Texas Department of Criminal Justice relocated its death row in March 1999 to the Terrell Unit (now renamed the Allan B. Polunsky Unit), in West Livingston, Polk County. The Work Capable Program was discontinued.

== Co-escapees ==
- Eric Dewayne Cathey (27), on death row since 1997, convicted of murdering Christine Castillo in 1995.
- James Edward Clayton (32), executed May 25, 2000, convicted of murdering Lori Barrett in 1987.
- Henry Earl Dunn (24), executed February 6, 2003, convicted of murdering Nicholus West in 1993.
- Gustavo Julian Garcia (26), executed February 16, 2016, convicted of killing Craig Turski in 1990. He also killed Gregory Martin in 1991, but was never tried.
- Howard Guidry (22), on death row since 1997, convicted of murdering Farah Fratta in 1994.
- Ponchai Wilkerson (27), executed March 14, 2000, convicted of murdering Chung Yi in 1990.
