= Melvin White =

Melvin White may refer to:

- Melvin White (murderer) (1950–2005), convicted murderer
- Melvin White (American football) (born 1990), NFL player
- Slappy White (Melvin Edward White, 1921–1995), American comedian

== See also ==
- Mel White, American clergyman and author
