= I Am a Killer =

2018 documentary television series

- Genre: Documentary; Crime
- Country of origin: United Kingdom
- Original language: English
- No. of seasons: 6
- No. of episodes: 44

Production
- Running time: 52 minutes
- Production companies: Sky Vision; Znak & Co.

Original release
- Release: 3 August 2018 – present

I Am a Killer is a television documentary series on Netflix and Crime+Investigation UK that features interviews with convicted murderers, including death row inmates. Season 2 aired in the United Kingdom in 2019 and aired internationally on Netflix from 31 January 2020. On 30 August 2022 Season 3 aired on Netflix in the United States. A fourth season was released on 21 December 2022, on Netflix. A fifth season was released on 16 October 2024, on Netflix. Season 6, which consists of 6 episodes, was released on 8 January 2025, on Netflix.

== Episodes ==
=== Series overview ===
Series	Episodes	Originally released
1	10	3 August 2018
2	10	31 January 2020
3	6	30 August 2022
4	6	21 December 2022
5	6	16 October 2024
6	6	8 January 2025

=== Season 1 (2018) ===
No. overall	No. in season	Title	Inmate(s)	Original release date
1	1	"Means to an End"	James Robertson	3 August 2018
2	2	"Killer in the Eyes of the Law"	Kenneth Foster	3 August 2018
3	3	"The Mockingbird"	Justin Dickens	3 August 2018
4	4	"Sympathy for the Devil"	Miguel Angel Martinez	3 August 2018
5	5	"Intended Evil"	Charles Victor Thompson	3 August 2018
6	6	"Declared Competent"	David Lewis	3 August 2018
7	7	"Family Affair"	Deandra Buchanan	3 August 2018
8	8	"Hunted"	Robert Shafer	3 August 2018
9	9	"Living with the Consequences"	Joshua Nelson	3 August 2018
10	10	"A Matter of Life and Death"	Wayne C. Doty	3 August 2018

=== Season 2 (2020) ===
No. overall	No. in season	Title	Inmate(s)	Original release date
11	1	"In Her Hands"	Lindsay Haugen	31 January 2020
12	2	"Overkill"	David Barnett	31 January 2020
13	3	"An Ordinary Boy"	Leo Little and Jose Zavala	31 January 2020
14	4	"Trapped"	Linda Lee Couch	31 January 2020
15	5	"Honorable Intentions"	Mark Arthur	31 January 2020
16	6	"Pyro Joe"	Joseph Murphy	31 January 2020
17	7	"Owning It"	Charles "Billy" Armentrout	31 January 2020
18	8	"Crossing The Line"	Cavona Flenoy	31 January 2020
19	9	"A Silent Order"	Brandon Hutchison	31 January 2020
20	10	"Something Hideous"	Toby Williams	31 January 2020

=== Season 3 (2022) ===
No. overall	No. in season	Title	Inmate(s)	Original release date
21	1	"A Question of Loyalty"	Victoria Smith	30 August 2022
22	2	"Someone Else"	Deryl Madison	30 August 2022
23	3	"History Repeating"	Daniel Paulsrud	30 August 2022
24	4	"Blackout"	James Walker	30 August 2022
25	5	"Rolling the Dice"	Chucky Phillips and Eduardo Trinidad	30 August 2022
26	6	"A Bad Day"	David Cameron Keith	30 August 2022

=== Season 4 (2022) ===
No. overall	No. in season	Title	Inmate(s)	Original release date
27	1	"Family Matters"	Anthony Standifer	21 December 2022
28	2	"A Mother's Love"	Jema Donahue	21 December 2022
29	3	"Serving Time"	Toby Gregory	21 December 2022
30	4	"A Father's Shadow"	Nasim Irsan	21 December 2022
31	5	"The Bogeyman"	Gary Black	21 December 2022
32	6	"Friendly Fire"	Thomas "TJ" Schifferns	21 December 2022

=== Season 5 (2024) ===
No. overall	No. in season	Title	Inmate(s)	Original release date
33	1	"Redemption"	Jamel Hatcher	16 October 2024
34	2	"Lost Innocence"	Christian Sims and Ashley Morrison	16 October 2024
35	3	"Lives Lost"	Higinio Gonzalez	16 October 2024
36	4	"If Things Were Different"	Ezdeth Highley	16 October 2024
37	5	"Loved To Death"	Rex Groves	16 October 2024
38	6	"A Brutal Outcome"	Makueeyapee Whitford	16 October 2024

=== Season 6 (2025) ===
No. overall	No. in season	Title	Inmate(s)	Original release date
39	1	"A Mother's Choice Pt. 1"	Candie Dominguez and Daniel Lopez	8 January 2025
40	2	"A Mother's Choice Pt. 2"	Candie Dominguez and Daniel Lopez	8 January 2025
41	3	"Defense of Another"	Walter Triplett Jr.	8 January 2025
42	4	"A Common Purpose"	Kimberly Dunkin	8 January 2025
43	5	"Time Bomb"	Leroy Schmitz	8 January 2025
44	6	"Choices"	Kevin Saxon	8 January 2025
