= Shattered (Casey book) =

True crime book by Kathryn Casey

- Author: Kathryn Casey
- Language: English
- Genre: True crime, Biography
- Publisher: HarperCollins
- Publication date: 2010
- Pages: 384 pp (Paperback ed)
- ISBN: 0-06-158202-6
- OCLC: 2010484377

Shattered: The True Story of a Mother's Love, a Husband's Betrayal, and a Cold-Blooded Texas Murder, by author and novelist Kathryn Casey, is a true-crime account of the killing of a pregnant woman whose body was discovered in 1999 in an upstairs closet in her home in Katy, Texas, near Houston. The book was published by HarperCollins in June 2010. Ms. Casey details numerous reasons that prove no one except David Temple had either motive or opportunity.

== Case synopsis ==
Belinda Lucas and David Temple dated as classmates at Stephen F. Austin University in Nacogdoches, Texas. David became a high school coach, and Belinda a teacher. They married and had one child, a boy, who was three years old at the time of his mother's death. On January 11, 1999, Belinda, 30 years old and eight months pregnant with their second child, was killed by a single gunshot blast to her head. The weapon, a 12-gauge shotgun, was never found.

The case remained long unsolved until the prosecutor determined that Temple, a football coach and teacher, had been an emotionally abusive husband involved in an extra-marital affair and, thus, had a motive for killing Belinda.

Temple, represented by defense lawyer Dick DeGuerin, was convicted in November 2007 of murder in the deaths of his wife and unborn baby. He was sentenced to life in prison with eligibility for parole after 30 years. He appealed the conviction.

In July 2015, a judge found that Temple should get a new trial based on violations by Deputy District Attorney Kelly Siegler of the Brady rule, which requires prosecutors to disclose materially exculpatory evidence. In November 2016, the Texas Court of Criminal Appeals ruled that the guilty verdict be set aside and granted Temple a new trial because Temple's attorney had not been able to present a proper defense.

On December 28, 2016, Temple was released on $30,000 bond pending a new trial.

On August 6, 2019 David Temple was found guilty in the second murder trial of his first wife, Belinda Temple, and unborn child.

== Reception ==
The book remained on Amazon.com's Top 100 bestseller for months after its June 2010 release.

Crime Magazine wrote that "Casey brings all the participants in this tragedy, both heroic and villainous, vividly to life." The Daily Sentinel called the book a "heartbreaking story of the murder of a young pregnant mother and a frustrating investigation... ."

‘’Shattered’’ made the Book of the Month Club listing upon its release. It also was included on Doubleday’s Book Club list under the true crime and drama genres.

In January 2017, the Houston Press referenced Casey, saying she "covered the (Temple) case in her gripping 2010 book Shattered."
