= Livingston Municipal Airport (Texas) =

- IATA: none; ICAO: none; FAA LID: 00R

Summary
- Airport type: Public
- Owner: City of Livingston
- Serves: Livingston, Texas
- Location: West Livingston, Texas
- Elevation AMSL: 151 ft / 46 m
- Coordinates: 30°41′09″N 095°01′05″W

Map

Runways
Direction	Length		Surface
Direction	ft	m	Surface
12/30	3,700	1,128	Asphalt

Statistics (2008)
- Aircraft operations: 7,800
- Based aircraft: 28
- Source: Federal Aviation Administration

Livingston Municipal Airport (FAA LID: 00R) is a city-owned, public-use airport located five nautical miles (5.8 statute miles, 9.2 km) southwest of the central business district of Livingston, a city in Polk County, Texas, United States. According to the FAA's National Plan of Integrated Airport Systems for 2009–2013, it is categorized as a general aviation facility.

The airport is located in West Livingston along Farm to Market Road 350 South and along the eastern side of Lake Livingston. The Texas Department of Criminal Justice Polunsky Unit (home to the state's death row) is located on the other side of FM 350.

== Facilities and aircraft ==
Livingston Municipal Airport covers an area of 63 acres (25 ha) at an elevation of 151 feet (46 m) above mean sea level. It has one runway designated 12/30 with an asphalt surface measuring 3,700 by 60 feet (1,128 x 18 m).

For the 12-month period ending May 13, 2008, the airport had 7,800 general aviation aircraft operations, an average of 21 per day. At that time there were 28 aircraft based at this airport: 86% single-engine, 7% multi-engine and 7% ultralight.

== See also ==
- List of airports in Texas
