= Rodney Reed =

American death row inmate (born 1967)

- Born: Rodney Rodell Reed; December 22, 1967 (age 58); Ventura, California, U.s.
- Known for: Murder conviction and death sentence
- Status: Incarcerated
- Conviction: Capital murder (×2)
- Penalty: Death

Details
- Victims: Stacey Lee Stites
- Date apprehended: 1997
- Imprisoned at: Allan B. Polunsky Unit

Rodney Rodell Reed (born December 22, 1967) is an American death row inmate who was convicted on May 29, 1998, by a Bastrop County District Court jury for the April 1996 abduction, rape, and murder of Stacey Stites, a 19-year-old resident of Giddings, Texas.

Although Reed initially denied knowing Stites, after his DNA matched semen inside Stites's dead body, Reed said that he was having a clandestine affair with Stites and that they had consensual sex the day before her death. During the penalty phase of the trial, the state argued for capital punishment on the basis of Reed being suspected in the rapes of four women and a 12-year-old and an attack on another woman. Reed was sentenced to death on May 29, 1998, and is incarcerated at the Allan B. Polunsky Unit death row facility in Polk County, Texas.

His conviction and death sentence remain controversial. Reed was scheduled to be executed on November 20, 2019, but doubt over Reed's guilt led to bipartisan support for a stay of his execution from Texas state legislators, as well as numerous celebrities and other public figures. On November 15, 2019, the Texas Board of Pardons and Paroles unanimously recommended that Texas Governor Greg Abbott grant Reed a 120-day reprieve. Later that day, the Texas Court of Criminal Appeals indefinitely stayed Reed's execution to review his claims of actual innocence. His execution was further delayed in 2023 when the Supreme Court authorized Reed to seek DNA testing on the murder weapon.

== Early life ==
Reed's father, Walter, was a native of Bastrop, Texas, and an Air Force veteran while his mother, Sandra, was a nurse. Reed was raised with his six brothers in Texas and attended Hirschi High School in Wichita Falls, Texas. He played on the school's football team and was a state Golden Gloves champion boxer.

== Murder of Stacey Stites ==
Stacey Stites, a 19-year-old resident of Giddings, Texas, was found dead on April 23, 1996. Police had received a call at 3:11 pm notifying them that her unidentified body had been discovered in some bushes near a dirt road behind Bastrop High School in Bastrop, Texas. A pickup truck that belonged to Stites' fiancé that she regularly drove to work had been found earlier, parked at the school nearby. The authorities determined that Stites had been beaten, sodomized, and raped before being strangled to death with her belt sometime between 3:00 and 5:00 am. When discovered in the bushes, Stites was wearing a black bra and jeans. Part of the belt that had been used to kill her was found near her body, and the other part of the belt was found near the truck. Her body had been partially burned, and her shirt was found nearby.

Stites had lived in Giddings with her fiancé, a local police officer, Jimmy Fennell Jr., whom she was scheduled to marry in three weeks. Her fiancé said he last saw her around 3:00 am after the couple showered together and she left for work. Bastrop High School was en route from their home in Giddings on the way to her workplace in the produce section at the H-E-B grocery store in Bastrop. After Stites did not arrive for her 3:30 am shift, the store called her mother, who then called the police.

H-E-B offered a $50,000 reward for information leading to the capture of her killer, but it went unclaimed. On July 12, 1996, an anonymous woman called the authorities once and said she believed that her son may have been with Stites in the hours before she was killed, but the call could not be traced.

Stites was buried in her hometown of Corpus Christi on April 26, 1996. Her brother never recovered from her death and died by suicide in 1997.

== Arrest and trial ==
The authorities began to suspect Reed had been involved in the Stites murder based on similarities in the case to an attack on another woman six months later on November 9, 1996. Linda Schlueter, age 19, had agreed to give a ride to a man she met after stopping at a drive-up payphone at a now-closed Long's Star Mart. When she went to drop him off, he attacked her and said he would kill her if she failed to perform sexual acts upon him, but then fled the scene with her vehicle after seeing car lights approaching. Reed was detained by police based on Schlueter's description, and she subsequently picked him out of a photo line-up. The police department had been familiar with him because of prior arrests.

Schlueter's vehicle was found close to where Stites's pickup truck had been abandoned at Bastrop High School. DNA extracted from three sperm found in Stites' vagina and saliva found on her chest matched to Reed. Local law enforcement already had Reed's DNA on file from an investigation into an alleged rape of a woman with intellectual disabilities in May 1995. Reed was officially charged with the murder of Stacey Stites on April 4, 1997, and held without bond. At the time, he was already in jail on an unrelated charge. He was indicted and "charged with two counts of capital murder, one for murder in the course of aggravated sexual assault and one for murder in the course of kidnapping." His arraignment was scheduled for May 29, 1997, and jury selection began in March 1998. The jury was described as "mostly white", with no African-Americans among the 12 jurors or two alternates. The case against Reed rested heavily upon the DNA evidence, with no additional physical evidence or eyewitness testimony.

Upon his initial questioning by police and before he learned about the DNA evidence, Reed denied knowing Stites outside of what he had heard in news reports. At trial, Reed's defense attorneys, Lydia Clay-Jackson and Calvin Garvey, argued that there had been a clandestine sexual relationship between Reed and Stites. Reed said that he initially denied knowing Stites because it would be best for him not to admit to knowing "a dead white girl" and later because "I knew she was seeing a cop, and we're in the South. There's still a lot of racism going on." The prosecutors noted that Reed had previously used a similar defense of a clandestine affair when charged with a different aggravated rape in 1987 which had led to him being acquitted.

According to prosecutor Lisa Tanner, DNA evidence was taken from 15 suspects, including Stites' fiancé and individuals who allegedly confessed to or bragged about the killing. DNA testing eliminated everyone except Reed as the source of the semen. Police investigators claimed that they could find no one who would attest to a relationship between Reed and Stites, including her mother and sister, and the defense brought forward no witnesses who could testify to the affair. Further, Stites' mother claimed that her daughter and her fiancé "looked happy and in love". However, in 2021 prosecutors disclosed that three co-workers of Stites had given statements to the police that Reed and Stites knew each other and appeared "close". This evidence was not presented at Reed's trial. The prosecution put forward the DNA evidence and speculated that Reed may have ambushed Stites at a railroad crossing or a stoplight on her way to work the morning of the murder.

Reed's defense attempted to implicate either Fennell, whom they portrayed as a controlling and possessive partner and would later serve 10 years in prison for kidnapping and raping a woman in 2007, or David Lawhon, who had raped and murdered another woman, Mary Ann Ardlt, in Elgin ten days after Stites' murder. Several witnesses recalled that Lawhon had dated a woman they believed to be Stites in the past, although the prosecution suggested they had confused Stites with one of Lawhon's other girlfriends. Other witnesses claimed that Lawhon, after killing Ardlt, had bragged about killing Stites as well. Lawhon himself, serving a 50-year prison sentence for the Ardlt murder, refused to testify citing his right against self-incrimination. In rebuttal, the prosecution emphasized that both Fennell and Lawhon had been excluded by DNA testing. The defense also called Iris Lindley, a friend of Reed's parents, to establish the existence of a relationship between Reed and Stites. Lindley testified that in early 1996 a white woman with brown hair whose name was "either Stacey or Stephanie" had come looking for Reed and she had believed this woman was Reed's girlfriend. She pointed to a photo of Stites as looking similar to this woman.

Reed was convicted on May 18, 1998, after a jury deliberation of six hours. Stites' family and friends were relieved by the conviction. Reed's family wept because they were convinced that he was innocent. He was sentenced to death on May 28, 1998, after a deliberation of four hours. During sentencing, prosecutors pushed for the death penalty by arguing that Reed was likely to pose a danger in the future based on a history of similar previous charges. To bolster their case, the prosecution brought forward women Reed allegedly raped: Schlueter, a 12-year-old girl, the intellectually disabled woman, and a woman named Vivian Harbottle to testify against him in the penalty phase. The prosecution asserted that DNA found on them matched Reed.

== Appeals and stays of execution ==
Reed has unsuccessfully appealed nine times on grounds of ignored witnesses and evidence that might have raised reasonable doubt but was not handed over to defense attorneys because prosecutors claimed that it was irrelevant. Reed's attorneys have subsequently argued that the broken belt used in the murder has never been tested for DNA and that forensic experts have admitted to making errors in their testimony. His case has since been taken up by the Innocence Project.

Reed was scheduled to be executed on January 14, 2015, but the execution was rescheduled to March 5, 2015, based on a request by the state. On February 23, 2015, his execution was stayed to allow the consideration of further evidence. His execution was later rescheduled for November 20, 2019.

In the weeks preceding the November execution date, celebrities such as Kim Kardashian West, Rihanna, Beyoncé, Meek Mill, Pusha T, Susan Sarandon, Seth Green, and Oprah Winfrey publicly urged Texas Governor Greg Abbott to exonerate Reed or stay his execution. Some, such as Amanda Seales, have rescinded their support for Reed's exoneration after learning more about his history. The case received coverage in major news outlets, and Reed was interviewed on an episode of Dr. Phil, in which host Phil McGraw opined that Reed should not be executed because he had not received a fair trial. By November 14, 2019, a petition to free Reed started by Shaun King had reportedly garnered more than three million signatures.

A bipartisan group of 16 Texas state senators has petitioned Abbott to stay the death penalty on grounds that new, possibly exculpatory evidence had come to light. On November 15, 2019, the Texas Board of Pardons and Paroles unanimously recommended that Texas Governor Greg Abbott grant Reed a 120-day reprieve. Later that day, the Texas Court of Criminal Appeals indefinitely stayed Reed's execution to review claims of Brady violations, false testimony, and actual innocence.

On February 24, 2020, the Supreme Court announced that it would not be taking up Reed's appeal, citing ongoing litigation in lower courts.

On October 31, 2021, a Bastrop County judge appointed to reexamine the case recommended to the Texas Court of Criminal Appeals that Reed should not receive a new trial.

On June 28, 2023, the Texas Court of Criminal Appeals denied Rodney Reed a new trial. The appeals court wrote in its 7-1 ruling that Reed had not "demonstrated that he is more-likely-than-not innocent". Reed applied to the Supreme Court for a writ of certiorari, a request which was rejected without comment in July 2024.

=== Reed v. Goertz ===
On April 25, 2022, the Supreme Court of the United States agreed to hear Reed's case. Reed argued that the belt used to commit the murder was never tested for DNA and that the state's statute of limitations on when a DNA test could be performed on evidence was unconstitutional, and claimed he should have been permitted to begin federal appeals once all state litigation had been completed, rather than immediately after the initial ruling that denied the testing. The case was set to be heard on October 11, 2022.

During Reed's hearing, the state argued that Reed was merely trying to delay his execution, which Chief Justice John Roberts had expressed concerns over. Other justices, including Neil Gorsuch and Elena Kagan, questioned Texas Solicitor General Judd Stone's view that Reed had filed his appeal too late.

On April 19, 2023, SCOTUS sided with Reed on the statute of limitations question in a 6–3 decision.

== In popular culture ==
Reed was the subject of the 2006 documentary film State vs. Reed and a 2018 episode of the CNN series Death Row Stories.

== See also ==
- List of death row inmates in the United States
- List of people scheduled to be executed in the United States
