= Kathryn Casey =

American novelist

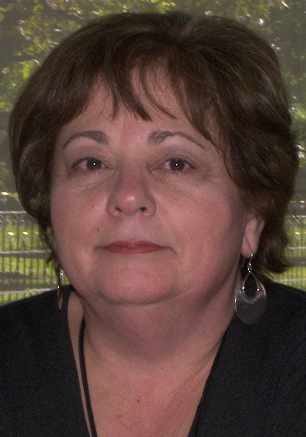
- Kathryn Casey at the 2009 Texas Book Festival
- Education: University of Houston
- Occupations: Crime writer, novelist
- Writing career
- Period: 1984–present
- Genre: Crime fiction
- Subject: True crime
- Website: www.kathryncasey.com

Kathryn Casey is an American writer of mystery novels and non-fiction books. She is best known for writing She Wanted It All, which recounts the case of Celeste Beard, who married an Austin multimillionaire only to convince her lesbian lover, Tracey Tarlton, to kill him.

== Early life and education ==
In 1980, Casey moved with her husband to Texas, where she attended the University of Houston and earned a degree in journalism.

== Career ==
In 1984, Casey began writing as an intern at the now-defunct Houston City Magazine. She left two years later as a senior editor. She then worked for two years as editor of Ultra, a regional magazine geared toward wealthy Texans.

Casey wrote for Ladies' Home Journal, where she was a contributing editor for 18 years, as well as More (magazine), TV Guide, Rolling Stone, Seventeen, Reader's Digest, and Texas Monthly. During her years as a magazine journalist, Casey interviewed celebrities in the movie, television, and recording industry, plus presidents and first ladies. She covered subjects ranging from the Oklahoma City bombing, the aftermath of 9/11, and Hurricane Katrina, to infertility and the McCaughey Septuplets.

Casey's articles often examined sensational crimes. In the early 1990s, one case she covered for Ladies' Home Journal bout a serial rapist attacking Houston-area women, resulted in her first book, The Rapist's Wife. After its release, Casey concentrated on writing nonfiction, fact-based crime books.

Her seventh true-crime book covered the Matt Baker case in Waco, Texas, about the Baptist minister who was convicted of killing his wife and staging it to look like a suicide. Baker, sentenced to 65 years, resides in the Allan B. Polunsky Unit, a Texas state prison. Cy-Fair Magazine, upon the July 2012 release of the book Deadly Little Secrets, covered the Baker case and others in a feature article about Casey. The Houston Chronicle also covered the release of the book. Deadly Little Secrets was the inspiration for the film Sins of the Preacher, which aired on the Lifetime television network in September 2013.

Casey then turned to crime fiction. In 2009, Booklist, the publication of the American Library Association, named Casey's debut novel, Singularity, one of the "Best Crime Novel Debuts of 2009" on its Bestseller Lists. The main character in her mystery series is Sarah Armstrong, a Texas Ranger and a criminal profiler. In Singularity, Armstrong travels across Texas hunting a serial killer. Library Journal picked the third in the series, The Killing Storm, as a best book of 2010 in its mystery category.

Casey's 11th book, Deliver Us, released January 2015 by HarperCollins, is based on murders along the Texas Killing Fields and Interstate 45. In March 2014, Elle Magazine included Casey along with Agatha Christie, Jane Smiley, Edna Buchanan, Joyce Carol Oates, Gillian Flynn, Ann Rule and others, in a list of "The Ten Best Thrillers and Crime Writing by Women".

Casey was a co-founder of Women in Crime Ink, which has been described by the Wall Street Journal as "a blog worth reading".

In July 2011, she wrote an article for Forbes Woman about new options available to authors with the advent of eBooks and independent publishing.

Her first foray into historical fiction, released in September 2023, was Angel Falls, inspired by the life of Ruth Robertson, a photojournalist whose 1949 expedition successfully measured Angel Falls in Venezuela as the tallest waterfall in the world.

Author Ann Rule called her "one of the best in the true crime genre".

== Personal life ==
She lives in Houston, Texas, with her husband.

== Appearances ==
In 1995, Casey appeared on The Oprah Winfrey Show to discuss The Rapist's Wife along with the subject in the title, Linda Bergstrom. In the years since, Casey has appeared on Oprah Winfrey's Oxygen Network, Court TV, Biography, Nancy Grace, E! Network, Investigation Discovery and the A&E.

In October 2006, she appeared on The Montel Williams Show to discuss women who unknowingly dated wanted criminals.

She appeared in ABC's 20/20 November 2022 episode "Tainted Love" about the murder of millionaire businessman Steven Beard by the lover of his younger wife Celeste Beard.

Casey was featured in the 2022 Netflix documentary miniseries Crime Scene: The Texas Killing Fields, directed by Jessica Dimmock.

She speaks at book festivals and events, including the Texas Library Association convention, Southwest Louisiana Writer's Conference, Pulpwood Queens Girlfriend Weekend book conference, and the Texas Book Festival.

== Books ==
=== True Crime ===
- A Warrant to Kill (2000 HarperCollins) (ISBN 0380780410))
- She Wanted It All (2005 Avon Books) (ISBN 0739452282)
- A Descent into Hell (2008 HarperCollins) (ISBN 0061230871)
- Die, My Love (2007 HarperCollins) (ISBN 0060846208)
- Evil Beside Her (2008 HarperCollins) reissue of The Rapist's Wife (ISBN 0061582018)
- Shattered (2010 HarperCollins) (ISBN 0061582026)
- Murder, I Write (2011 Crime Rant Classics) (ASIN B005I6B2JE)
- Deadly Little Secrets (2012 HarperCollins) (ISBN 0062018558)
- Deliver Us: Three Decades of Murder and Redemption in the Infamous I-45/Texas Killing Fields (2015 HarperCollins) (ISBN 0062300490)
- Possessed: The Infamous Texas Stiletto Murder (2016 William Morrow) (ISBN 0062300512)
- In Plain Sight: The Kaufman County Prosecutor Murders (2018 William Morrow) (ISBN 9798988247715)

=== Historical fiction ===
- Angel Falls (2023 Kathryn Casey Publishing) (ISBN 0062363506)

=== Sarah Armstrong Mystery series ===
- Singularity (2008 St. Martin's Minotaur, 1st in series) (ISBN 0312379501)
- Blood Lines (2009 St Martin's Minotaur, 2nd in series) (ASIN B00A8QHMJ8)
- The Killing Storm (November 2010 St. Martin's Minotaur, 3rd in series) (ISBN 098466629X)
- The Buried (November 2018, 4th in series) (ASIN B07H2JPXYM)
- Bone Cold (October 2024, 5th in series) (ASIN B0CZPLHM7Z)

=== Clara Jefferies Mystery series ===
- The Fallen Girls (2020 Hachette, 1st in series) (ISBN 1838886028)
- Her Final Prayer (2020 Hachette, 2nd series) (ISBN 1800190360)
- The Blessed Bones (2021 Hachette, 3rd series) (ISBN 180019370X)
