= In Plain Sight (Casey book) =

- Book cover
- Author: Kathryn Casey
- Language: English
- Genre: True crime, nonfiction
- Published: (William Morrow), 2018
- Publication place: United States
- Media type: Print (mass-market paperback), Audible Audio Edition, Kindle eBook
- Pages: 496
- ISBN: 9780062363503
- OCLC: 1060781083
- Dewey Decimal: 364.152/4092
- LC Class: HV6533.T4 C374 2018

In Plain Sight: The Kaufman County Prosecutor Murders is a true crime account by American journalist and author Kathryn Casey of the 2013 murders of two prosecutors and a wife by a disgruntled justice of the peace. William Morrow released the book in March 2018.

== Crimes and trial ==
The deadly crime spree the book covers began in January 2013 when attorney and Justice of the Peace Eric Williams shot and killed Kaufman County, Texas Assistant District Attorney Mark Hasse as he exited his car in the courthouse parking lot while Kim Williams waited in the car for him. Then, two months later, Williams, with his wife again in the car with him, drove to the home of District Attorney Mike McLelland, 63, and his wife Cynthia, 65, and shot them inside their house. They were found dead from gunshot wounds on March 30, 2013.

The motive for Williams, as testified to in court by his wife Kim, was his anger over a burglary, in which Williams had been arrested and convicted after being caught taking $600 worth of computer monitors from the county's IT storage room, causing him to lose both his position as justice of the peace and his license to practice law. His wife later testified that Williams told her he felt McLelland, Hasse and others had set him up.

The book describes Kaufman, a small, quiet Texas town where everyone knows each other, as being thrown into chaos when a county assistant district attorney is killed in broad daylight, then shortly after the district attorney and his wife are murdered as well.

In December 2014, a jury convicted Eric Williams of capital murder in the 2013 death of Cynthia McLelland. A judge then sentenced him to death. Kim Williams pleaded guilty to murder and was sentenced to 40 years in prison.

Author Casey attended Eric Williams's trial as part of her research for the book. After the convictions, Casey visited Williams on death row for an in-prison interview. She interviewed Kim Williams in prison as well. Those prison interviews, which were the first by a journalist with the Kaufman killers, are included in the book.

== In the news ==
In Plain Sight drew attention in February 2019 when 19-year-old Kevin Alvarez, a suspect in the machete killing of a 15-year-old boy, was pictured entering the Bronx Supreme Court clutching Casey's book about the real-life murders of Texas prosecutors McLelland and Hasse. The prosecution did not comment about Alvarez taking the book to court or whether they believed it was meant as a threat.

== See also ==
Kaufman County murders
