= Ponchai Wilkerson =

American convincted murderer (1971–2000)

Ponchai Kamau Wilkerson

Ponchai Kamau Wilkerson (July 15, 1971 – March 14, 2000) (also Ponchai Kamau, Kamau Wilkerson, Ponchai "Kamau" Wilkerson) was a convicted murderer executed by lethal injection by the U.S. state of Texas. He was convicted for the 28 November 1990 murder of jeweler Chung Myong Yi. He was convicted by a jury on July 16, 1991, and ten days later sentenced to death by the same jury.

== Early life ==
Ponchai Kamau Wilkerson (โพนชัย กาเมา วิลเกอร์สัน), of African-American and Thai descent, was born in Houston, Texas. Not much is known about Wilkerson's early childhood; he later grew up in the Fort Bend-Houston area east of Missouri City, Texas, attending public schools in the Fort Bend Independent School District. Ponchai graduated from Willowridge High School in 1990.

== Criminal activities ==
On November 28, 1990, Wilkerson and Wilton Bethony entered Yi Chung Myong's jewelry shop Royal Gold Jewelry Store in Houston, Texas. They had been on a crime spree for a month. Wilkerson left briefly twice, and pulled a Glock pistol from his jacket upon returning the second time and fired the gun once without warning at Yi Chung Myong's temple from a distance of 30 cm (12 inches). During the trial, Wilkerson testified that the murder was not committed in self-defense or accidentally. Bethony was convicted of aggravated robbery and received a life sentence.

At the sentencing phase, prosecutors introduced evidence of other crimes committed by Wilkerson, who had been on probation for unauthorized use of a motor vehicle at the time of the murder. On November 5, 1990, just over three weeks prior to the murder, Wilkerson and Bethony had assaulted and robbed Anthony Jolivet at gunpoint. On November 13, Wilkerson, Bethony, Kenneth Joseph, and Eddie Bolden stole a car, then robbed a store. Bethony shot the owner of the store in the chest with a shotgun, albeit the victim survived his injuries. On November 18, Wilkerson and Bethony burglarized a store by a driving a vehicle into the store and through the burglar bars. On November 19, Wilkerson, Bethony, Joseph, and Bolden stole a car. On November 20, the four searched for a person who had pulled a gun on Bolden earlier. They did not find him, but Wilkerson stopped and asked to two boys at a nearby fence if they were talking to him. When they said they were not, Wilkerson opened fired on them, shooting and wounding both of them. A stray bullet also struck 13-year-old Kesia Nealy, who was walking from school, one inch from her heart.

== Execution ==
The Texas Court of Criminal Appeals affirmed his conviction and sentence on December 12, 1994. He also appealed to the United States Court of Appeals for the Fifth Circuit and Supreme Court of the United States, who both denied his appeals.

During Thanksgiving Day, 1998, Wilkerson and six other death row inmates were involved in an attempted prison break. One inmate, Martin Gurule, managed to escape, but was shot and drowned soon afterwards. Wilkerson and the other six inmates involved all surrendered.

Wilkerson exhausted his final appeal to Judge Jan Krocker in February 2000. A dramatic scene involving community activist Njeri Shakur (member of the Texas Death Penalty Abolition Movement and the Allen Parkway Village Residents Council) shouting at Judge Krocker, which led to a contempt charge against Shakur. She was sentenced to 30 days in the Harris County Jail. Shakur and Deloyd Parker Jr. (the founder of the S.H.A.P.E. Community Centre) became friends with Ponchai while he was on death row.

On February 12, 2000, Wilkerson and fellow death row inmate Howard Guidry took 57-year-old guard Jeanette Bledsoe hostage at the Terrell Unit (now Allan B. Polunsky Unit) outside Livingston, Texas after Wilkerson apparently opened his cell door's lock. Members of the National Black United Front and the S.H.A.P.E. Centre demanded that Wilkerson release the hostage. Thirteen hours later, the guard was released unharmed.

On the day of his execution, Wilkerson refused to leave his cell at the Terrell Unit prison near Livingston, Texas. Guards were forced to use Mace-like gas and carry him to and from the death van that took him to the Hunstville Unit. He did not request a last meal or give any instructions on the disposal of his body. When asked by the warden if he had a last statement, he responded "This is not a capital punishment case!"

After the drugs were administered, Wilkerson spit out an inch-and-a-half universal handcuff and leg restraint key. It was unknown how Wilkerson obtained the key. Wilkerson was pronounced dead at 6:24 p.m.

== See also ==
- Capital punishment in Texas
- Capital punishment in the United States
- List of people executed in Texas, 2000–2009
- List of people executed in the United States in 2000
