= Leo Boatman =

American convicted serial killer (born 1986)

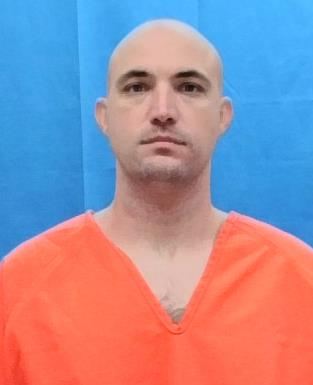
- Mugshot of Boatman
- Born: July 20, 1986 (age 40); Largo, Florida, U.S.
- Convictions: First-degree murder (x3) (Note: Out of all these convictions, two were for murders committed in 2006, while the third was in 2019); Third degree murder (Note: This was for a 2010 murder of an inmate.); Attempted murder (Note: This was related to a 2009 attempted murder of another inmate.); Constructive possession of contraband
- Penalty: 2006; 2 consecutive life sentences without parole; 2009; 7 years' imprisonment; 2010; 15 years' imprisonment (Note: The exact length of the jail term was 15 years, eight months and eight days, according to the Florida Department of Corrections.); 2019; Death

Details
- Victims: 4 dead, 1 alive
- Date: January 4, 2006 – July 5, 2019
- Location: Florida
- Imprisoned at: Union Correctional Institution

Leo Lancing Boatman (Note: His full name was also spelt as Leo Lansing Boatman in some sources.) (born July 20, 1986) is an American serial killer convicted of four murders in Florida between 2006 and 2019. Boatman first gained notoriety for murdering two college students at their campsite in the Ocala National Forest. Boatman was sentenced to two consecutive life sentences without parole after pleading guilty to the murders of Amber Peck and John Parker. During his incarceration, Boatman killed two other prisoners behind bars, one in 2010 and another in 2019. Boatman was convicted of third-degree murder for the 2010 killing of Ricky A. Morris and sentenced to 15 years in prison, but for the 2019 murder of William Chapman, Boatman and his accomplice William Edward Wells were both sentenced to death for first-degree murder. Boatman is presently on death row awaiting his execution.

== Early life ==
Leo Lancing Boatman was born on July 20, 1986, in a local psychiatric hospital in Florida, where his mother was confined; his biological father's identity remains unknown. Boatman's mother, who was diagnosed with schizophrenia, was mentally incompetent to fulfill her maternal duties and as a result, Boatman and his sister were given up for adoption and it was his grandmother who took him in, but the grandmother mistreated him. Boatman lived with his aunt and uncle from age four to six, and during his childhood, Boatman was sexually assaulted by an older cousin. Boatman was similarly sexually abused by a boyfriend of his mother. His mother later died in a drowning accident in 1995 while hitchhiking between Florida and Colorado.

Subsequently, Boatman was placed under foster care with a family in St. Petersburg, but his foster parents likewise abused him. Sources revealed that the same family had been previously reported for child abuse by many other children under their care, and allegations included that the foster father starved the children and forced them to do squat jumps. From the age of 12 to 19, Boatman spent seven years in detention under the custody of the Florida Department of Juvenile Justice for a variety of charges including escape, robbery, carrying a concealed weapon, battery, and assaulting prison guards. He was released from the high-security Omega Juvenile Prison in August 2005, just five months before he would commit the 2006 Ocala National Forest double murder.

== 2006 Ocala National Forest murders ==
On January 4, 2006, Leo Boatman killed two campers, John Parker and Amber Peck, in the Ocala National Forest, Florida.

Boatman, armed with an AK-47 rifle stolen from his friend, was hiking into the forest when he encountered two campers, Amber Peck and John Parker, who were both 26 and students of Santa Fe Community College. At first, the encounter had been cordial, with Parker giving directions for Boatman, who later aimed the rifle at the pair. As the two campers ran, Boatman chased them to a remote camping ground near Juniper Springs, and ultimately, Boatman shot the two of them dead. At the time of his deaths, Parker was a former Marine who had an eight-year-old daughter, while Peck, who joined the same school environment club as Parker, was originally from Michigan and planned to move to Australia to attend James Cook University.

Two days after Parker and Peck were murdered, their families conducted a search in the forest and the authorities were contacted as well. Amber Peck's father found her car on January 6, 2006, and Parker's friends and family managed to reach the campground where the victims were killed. Several police officers discovered the bodies disposed of in shallow waters near the edge of the campsite. Autopsy findings showed that Peck had been shot in the right arm, left biceps and both sides of her head, while there were multiple gunshot wounds in Parker's right shoulder, right foot, his left biceps and the right side of his neck.

A week after the double murder, Boatman was identified as the killer and arrested by the police. Prior to his capture, Boatman had confessed to a 20-year-old female friend about murdering someone in the woods and disposing of the bodies in a pond, and this prompted the friend to file a police report that led to Boatman's capture.

== First murder trial ==
On January 27, 2006, a Marion County grand jury indicted Leo Boatman for two counts of first-degree murder with a firearm, which warranted the maximum sentence of death if found guilty under Florida state law.

On July 30, 2007, Boatman pleaded guilty to two counts of first-degree murder for killing both Parker and Peck. As a condition of the plea bargain, the prosecution took the death penalty off the table and instead, he was sentenced to two consecutive life sentences without the possibility of parole. According to State Attorney Brad King, they agreed to not seek the death penalty and made the plea offer based on the wishes of the victims' families.

The families of Peck and Parker were allowed to give victim impact statements regarding the case, and they stated they hoped for a swift end to the prosecution of Boatman. Amber Peck's parents stated that their daughter would not want her killer to be executed. Parker's mother stated that her son was a "caring father and son" and also loved the forest.

== 2009 and 2010 prison crimes, second and third trial ==
On March 21, 2009, while imprisoned at the Cross City Correctional Institution, Boatman attempted to kill another prisoner, 34-year-old Mark Apicella (nicknamed "Apple Sauce"), who was serving time for theft, organized fraud and cocaine possession. Boatman hung Apicella by the neck with bedsheets, forcibly feeding him blood-pressure medication until correction officers intervened, saving Apicella's life. Boatman was convicted of attempted second-degree murder and had seven more years added to his double life sentence. Boatman purportedly claimed he never intended to kill Apicella, although the latter told the authorities Boatman was upset with him for receiving more mail than he himself did.

On August 18, 2010, while at the Charlotte Correctional Institution, Leo Boatman murdered his cellmate. Boatman attacked 27-year-old Ricky Morris, beating him and slamming his head down on the concrete floor. According to Inspector Kevin Michael Ortiz, when he arrived at the cell he witnessed Boatman continuing to beat Morris while he was bleeding and lying facedown. Morris did not die immediately from the wounds sustained during the attack; he was hospitalized for a month before he died in a coma on September 19, 2010, 17 days after his 28th birthday. At the time of his murder, Morris was serving two consecutive life terms without parole for the first-degree murder of his parents, Raymond and Deborah Morris, who were both shot to death on February 3, 2008.

On January 21, 2011, it was confirmed that Boatman would be charged with the murder of Morris. On August 15, 2013, the jury found Boatman guilty of a lesser charge of third-degree murder. Boatman was sentenced to 15 additional years in prison for the offence.

== 2019 murder of William Chapman ==
On May 3, 2019, Boatman, together with convicted serial killer William Edward Wells, (Note: At the time of the killing, Wells was already serving seven consecutive life sentences for the 2003 murders of his wife and four other people, as well as the 2008 attempted murder of a fellow inmate and 2011 murder of another inmate.) attacked and murdered 32-year-old William Chapman. (Note: According to official sources, Chapman was sentenced to nine years' jail for multiple counts of theft and burglary. In one case, Chapman and another man stole a woman's purse after breaking into her car, while in another case, Chapman broke into another woman's home and stole $6,000 worth of property, including jewelry, a laptop, a game console and a handgun.) At the time of his murder, Chapman was serving time for burglary and was set to be released in October 2019. A month prior to the killing, the pair first hatched the plot to kill Chapman, as Wells believed that Chapman wanted to recruit him for sexual favours.

Wells, Boatman, Chapman, and several other inmates were first escorted to the dayroom. Shortly after, both Boatman and Wells lured Chapman to a specific corner of the dayroom—a spot intentionally chosen because it was the CCTV camera's blind spot. Wells then produced a concealed ligature and began strangling Chapman while Boatman simultaneously started to beat him. As the assault continued, Boatman blocked the dayroom door to prevent corrections officers from intervening, while Wells continued to stab and beat Chapman.

Despite Chapman briefly forcing the door open during the attack, corrections officers could not gain full entry into the dayroom. Attempts to stop the attack included deployment of a chemical agent. This proved unsuccessful, as Boatman and Wells continued, apparently unfazed by the gas. The assault lasted approximately 12 minutes. Officers subdued the inmates and transported the fatally injured Chapman to a hospital, where he succumbed to his wounds shortly after receiving treatment.

== Fourth trial and death penalty ==
On November 4, 2019, a Bradford County grand jury indicted both Wells and Boatman for the first-degree murder of William Chapman. On that same day, State Attorney Bill Cervone confirmed that he would seek the death penalty for Wells and Boatman, and he described the murder to be "brutal, exceedingly brutal".

Both Wells and Boatman were tried separately for Chapman's murder. Wells was first put on trial on February 26, 2020, when he pleaded guilty to first-degree murder. Wells was sentenced to death by Judge Mark W. Moseley on May 25, 2021. He is currently incarcerated on death row at the Union Correctional Institution.

Boatman was the second of the pair to stand trial for murdering Chapman. He was found guilty by a Brevard County jury for first-degree murder on August 29, 2022.

On November 10, 2022, Boatman was sentenced to death by Judge James M. Colaw, after he waived his right to be sentenced by a jury.

== Death row ==
In the aftermath, in 2025, true crime documentary series World's Most Dangerous Prisoners re-enacted the case of Leo Boatman and the murders he committed.

On October 17, 2024, the Florida Supreme Court denied Leo Boatman's appeal against his death sentence.

As of 2025, Boatman is incarcerated on death row at the Union Correctional Institution.

== See also ==
- Capital punishment in Florida
- List of death row inmates in the United States § Florida
- List of serial killers in the United States
