= William Edward Wells =

American mass murderer and serial killer (born 1975)

William Wells
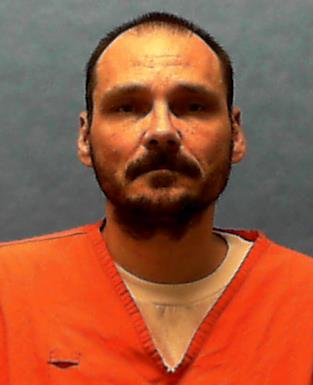
- Wells's FDOC photo
- Born: October 7, 1975 (age 51); Florida, U.S.
- Convictions: First-degree murder (x7) (Note: Out of all these convictions, five were for murders committed in 2003, one in 2011 and one in 2019); Attempted murder (Note: This was related to a 2008 attempted murder of another inmate.); Constructive possession of Contraband
- Penalty: 2003; 5 consecutive life sentences without parole; 2008; Life imprisonment without parole; 2011; Life imprisonment without parole; 2019; Death

Details
- Victims: 7 dead, 1 alive
- Date: May 14, 2003 – July 5, 2019
- Location: Florida
- Imprisoned at: Union Correctional Institution

William Edward Wells III (born October 7, 1975), dubbed the Monster of Mayport, is an American mass murderer and later serial killer convicted of murdering seven people in Florida from 2003 to 2019. Wells first committed the 2003 murders of his wife and four other people (including his wife's father and brother) over a 9-day period in Mayport. Wells pleaded guilty to all the five murders and was sentenced to five consecutive life sentences without the possibility of parole.

During his incarceration, Wells attempted to kill an inmate in 2008, and committed two murders of his fellow prisoners in prison, one in 2011 and another in 2019. For the 2008 attempted murder and 2011 murder of Xavier Rodriguez, Wells was handed an additional two terms of life imprisonment, while for the 2019 case, Wells and another prisoner were both sentenced to death for the murder of convicted burglar William Chapman. Wells is currently on death row awaiting execution, for which a date has yet to be scheduled.

== Biography ==
William Edward Wells III was born on October 7, 1975, in Florida. The Wells family were shrimp fishermen. He is the son of William Edwards Wells Sr. and Patricia "Patty" Wells, who his father had an affair with. During this time, William Sr. and his wife, Selma, were living in the Demi John Community near Freeport, Texas where William Sr. was operating a shrimp boat. When Billy was an infant, his father traveled to Florida, took Billy and brought him back to Texas where he was raised by his father and Selma. Billy didn't learn that Selma wasn't his biological mother until he was a teenager.

Long before Wells was born, his father killed two seven-year-old brothers, Robert and William Modesky, on December 9, 1961, while racing another car on Mayport Road. He was celebrating the end of a week of drinking by getting drunk, when Wells Sr. took Alice Ogilvie's 1958 Cadillac, with Alice and a friend in the back, and drove it at 90 mph (140 km/h). The newspapers dubbed him the "death car driver." Initially sentenced to 40 years in prison, he ultimately served 15 years.

Wells was born shortly after his father's release from prison. Little is known about Wells' childhood, but he grew up while his family transitioned into the restaurant business. During his childhood, Wells was given a nickname "Little Billy". In the mid-1990s, the Wells family met the McMains family, whose parents, Bill and Angie McMains, opened a restaurant serving crab salad, ribeye steaks, and “pizza burgers.” Competition between the restaurants was fierce, sparking jealousy and multiple acts of vandalism. Bill McMains even went so far as to fatally shoot a shrimp fisherman in September 1991, which led to the family restaurant being set on fire four times. In 1992, Patty Wells opened Peppermint Patty's to replace the Wells family restaurant. In 1993, the McMains reopened their old establishment under the name “Bill and Angie's”.

In the 1990s, Wells began a relationship with Irene “Tootie” McMains, Bill and Angie's daughter, who had two children from a previous relationship with Louis Floyd. Relations between Floyd and Wells were poor, and they often fought. Wells and McMains married and had a son, Froggy, in 1999. Another tragedy struck the family in 2000 when 7-year-old Louis Floyd Jr., one of Tootie's sons, was fatally struck by a semi-truck behind Bill and Angie's first restaurant, the same place where Bill McMains had shot a fisherman. Angie never recovered from the grief and died in 2002.

== 2003 Mayport murders ==
On May 14, 2003, in Mayport, Florida, an argument broke out between Wells, 27, and Tootie McMains, 30. After she told him she wanted to leave him, Wells shot her dead with a pistol. He then hid his wife's body and contacted Floyd to ask him to pick up his daughter. Floyd asked him where Tootie was, and Wells replied that she had gone to stay with her mother in Orlando. Finally, Floyd left with his daughter, without asking any questions. That same day, John McMains, the victim's 32-year-old brother, went to the Wells family home and discovered his sister's body. He flew into a rage and ordered Wells to turn himself in. Wells refused and shot him three times.

On May 17, 2003, Bill McMains, the 60-year-old father of Irene and John, arrived at the house and was also shot dead by Wells after discovering his two children had been shot to death. After this third murder, Wells covered the bodies with dirty clothes and sealed the room with duct tape. The next day, Wells contacted Richard L. Reese, his wife's former lover, aged 39. Wells invited him to spend the day at his home to discuss his relationship with his wife while smoking marijuana. When Reese arrived at Wells' home, an argument broke out over their romantic rivalry. Wells shot and killed Reese and hid the body in the residence. Finally, on May 23, 2003, Wells contacted James L. Young, 20, to ask him to deliver $650 worth of crack cocaine. Young also agreed to come over. According to Wells, Young made an offhand joke about stealing Wells' cannabis, at which point he was killed. Young's murder took place on his 20th birthday. After killing Young, Wells hid his body. Later that evening, Wells ordered a pizza. Brian Lukas answered the call and was tasked with delivering it. When Lukas arrived at the house, Wells attempted to convince the delivery driver that he smelled bad and offered him the use of the bathroom to wash up. Alarmed by the foul odors coming from the trailer, Lukas declined the offer and left.

On May 24, 2003, several people became concerned about the absence of Bill McMains, Wells' father-in-law. His disappearance was reported to the Mayport police. That same day, Wells called the police from his home and claimed to be holding his four-year-old son hostage. Wells also called a newspaper and confessed to the five murders. He claimed that his wife's death was an accident, explaining that he did not know his gun was loaded. According to him, this accidental death led to the four other murders. After 12 hours of hostage-taking and negotiations, Wells finally surrendered shortly after midnight on May 25, 2003. Wells was arrested and taken to the hospital after claiming to have overdosed on prescription drugs. During the search, the five bodies were discovered in various stages of decomposition. Placed in police custody, Wells said he wanted to plead guilty to manslaughter for the death of his wife and first-degree murder for the four other homicides. He even asked to be sentenced to death so that he could be executed as soon as possible. After his arrest, Wells was charged with five counts of first-degree murder and placed in pre-trial detention at the Florida State Prison.

== First trial and sentencing ==
Before his trial began, Wells requested permission to appear without lawyers to ensure that he would be executed after pleading guilty. He ultimately abandoned this decision on October 31, 2003, deciding to keep his lawyers.

On September 30, 2004, Wells pleaded guilty to five counts of first-degree murder in connection with the Mayport killings. Following this guilty plea, Judge Henry Davis ruled out the death penalty and sentenced Wells to five consecutive terms of life imprisonment without the possibility of parole.

== 2008 and 2011 prison crimes, second and third trial ==
On 10 May 2008, Wells nearly killed another inmate (whose identity remains unknown) while he was imprisoned at the Everglades Correctional Institution in Miami-Dade. As a result of the incident, on 26 June, Wells was found guilty of attempted murder and sentenced to a sixth life term.

On May 17, 2011, at the Florida State Prison, Wells and another prisoner, Wayne C. Doty, (Note: Before killing Rodriguez, Doty was serving a life sentence for the 1996 murder of Harvey Horne II.) attacked a fellow inmate named Xavier Rodriguez, who allegedly stole cigarettes from Doty and insulted him by calling him names. After obtaining a homemade knife from another inmate, both Doty and Wells attacked Rodriguez, stabbing and strangling the man to death.

On August 25, 2011, a Bradford County grand jury formally indicted both Doty and Wells for the first-degree murder of Rodriguez, and they faced the possibility of a death sentence as a result of the indictment, with State Attorney Bill Cervone announcing that he considered seeking it for the pair.

Wells stood trial in 2017, and was found guilty of first-degree murder by a Bradford County jury. On October 4, 2017, Wells was sentenced to life without parole a seventh time after the same jury recommended life in prison.

Doty was convicted of Rodriguez's murder and sentenced to death, and he reportedly requested to be executed by the electric chair, for which its use was discontinued since 1999 due to the botched execution of Allen Lee Davis.

== Murder of William Chapman (2019) ==
Eight years after he killed Xavier Rodriguez, William Wells committed another murder of a fellow prisoner at Florida State Prison.

On July 5, 2019, Wells and another prisoner, convicted serial killer Leo Boatman, attacked a 32-year-old inmate named William Chapman, which they plotted to commit since the previous month. Wells believed that Chapman wanted to recruit him for sexual favours. At the time of the attack, Chapman was serving a jail term for burglary and was slated to be released in October 2019. Boatman, like Wells, was convicted of multiple murders before killing Chapman, including one in prison. In 2007, he was sentenced to life without parole for the murders of Amber Peck and John Parker, who were killed by an AK-47 in the Ocala National Forest the year before. While in prison, he killed fellow prisoner Ricky Morris in 2010. He was convicted of third degree murder for Morris's death three years later and was given an additional 15 years. At the time of the prison killing, Morris had been serving a life sentence for murdering his parents in 2008.

Shortly before the assault on Chapman, Wells, Boatman, Chapman and several other inmates were taken to the dayroom. Both Boatman and Wells went into the bathroom, one after the other, and later lured Chapman into a corner of the dayroom, which happened to be the blind spot of the room's CCTV camera. Upon doing so, Wells took out a concealed ligature from his clothes and began to strangle Chapman while Boatman started to beat up Chapman. Subsequently, Boatman blocked the door to prevent corrections officers from entering the dayroom, while Wells continued to stab and beat Chapman.

During the stabbing and assault, Chapman managed to use his fingers to force the door open a little, but the correction officers could not open the door fully to enter, and despite throwing in a chemical agent, both Boatman and Wells persisted in the assault. The entire attack lasted about 12 minutes, before correction officers subdued the pair while they also brought the mortally wounded Chapman to a hospital. Chapman did not respond to medical treatment and died shortly after.

== Fourth trial and death sentence ==
On November 4, 2019, a Bradford County grand jury indicted both Wells and Boatman for the murder of Chapman. State Attorney Bill Cervone announced that he would seek the death penalty for Wells and Boatman, stating that the murder was "brutal, exceedingly brutal".

On December 3, 2019, a court order was issued to evaluate if Wells was mentally competent to stand trial.

On February 26, 2020, Wells pleaded guilty to the first-degree murder of Chapman. Wells also sought and later granted permission to dismiss his lawyer and represent himself in court.

On May 25, 2021, Wells was sentenced to death by Judge Mark W. Moseley, who remarked that the aggravating circumstances in the case far outweighed the mitigating factors.

Leo Boatman was similarly sentenced to death in 2022 for his role in the murder of Chapman. He is currently incarcerated on death row at the Union Correctional Institution.

== Death row ==
On April 13, 2023, the Florida Supreme Court denied William Wells's appeal against his death sentence.

As of 2025, Wells is incarcerated on death row at the Union Correctional Institution.

== See also ==
- Capital punishment in Florida
- List of death row inmates in the United States § Florida
- List of serial killers in the United States
