= 2012 Jefferson County, Texas, courthouse shooting =

2012 shooting and murder of a bystander in a Texas courthouse

- Location: Beaumont, Texas, United States
- Date: March 14, 2012
- Attack type: Mass shooting Attempted murder Murder by shooting
- Weapon: Gun
- Deaths: Minnie Ray Sebolt, 79
- Injuries: Samantha Jackson, 20; Claudia Jackson (age unknown); Leslie King (age unknown)
- Verdict: Guilty
- Convictions: Capital murder
- Sentence: Death (May 7, 2013)
- Convicted: Bartholomew Granger, 41

On March 14, 2012, in Beaumont, Texas, 41-year-old Bartholomew Granger (born September 26, 1970), who was on trial for the aggravated sexual assault of his daughter, attempted to shoot and kill his daughter outside the Jefferson County Courthouse. The shooting led to the murder of 79-year-old Minnie Ray Sebolt, and the wounding of another three women, including Granger's daughter and her mother. Granger was found guilty of capital murder for the death of Sebolt and sentenced to death on May 7, 2013.

== Shooting ==
On March 14, 2012, a gunman opened fire outside the Jefferson County Courthouse in Texas, resulting in the murder of a bystander and another three women wounded.

At that time, the shooter, 41-year-old Bartholomew Granger, and his brother were both charged with the aggravated sexual assault of Granger's 20-year-old daughter, who reported the both of them for allegedly sexually abusing her as a child. Furthermore, Granger was scheduled to appear in court to stand trial for the charges on the day of the shooting, and his daughter appeared in court the day before to testify against her father. Granger was said to have felt aggrieved over the ongoing trial and expressed to his lawyer his resentment towards the trial judge for allowing the witnesses to commit perjury and wanted a different judge and trial venue.

On the morning of the shooting, Granger took a gun from his vehicle in a nearby parking lot and opened fire at his daughter and her mother (who was Granger's ex-wife), causing them to be wounded. Apart from Granger's daughter and ex-wife, two female bystanders were also shot by Granger, and one of the bystanders, 79-year-old Minnie Ray Sebolt (also spelt Minnie Seabolt), died as a result of multiple gunshot wounds, while the other bystander was wounded on her finger. After the shooting, Granger drove his truck and ran over his daughter before he fled the courthouse. Granger's ex-wife was wounded on her buttocks, while Granger's daughter sustained severe gunshot injuries and was in critical condition when she was rushed to the hospital. At the time of her death, Sebolt was taking a friend to the VA Office, and her daughter described her as a "ray of sunshine" to the family, which was taken away by the gunman. The injured victims were identified as Samantha Jackson, Claudia Jackson and Leslie King. Samantha and Claudia were Granger's daughter and ex-wife respectively while King was a bystander.

While fleeing the scene, Granger was pursued by police officers and he engaged in a gunfight with them while driving. Despite being injured, Granger ultimately abandoned his vehicle and ran into a nearby building, where he held several occupants hostage. Granger was later subdued by two of the hostages and he later surrendered to the police, leading to his arrest.

== Charges ==
Mugshot of Granger

After his arrest, Bartholomew Granger was charged with the murder of Minnie Sebolt. He was subsequently detained at the Jefferson County Correctional Facility in lieu of a $4 million bond ($3 million for murder and the remaining $1 million for aggravated sexual assault.

In April 2012, Granger filed a motion to change his trial venue from Jefferson County to another county, with Galveston County being one of the possible venues on the list.

On May 17, 2012, Granger was formally indicted by a grand jury for the murder of Sebolt, in addition to three counts of attempted capital murder, four counts of aggravated kidnapping and one count of aggravated assault. A day after his indictment, a judge approved Granger's request to move his trial venue from Jefferson County to Galveston County.

In July 2012, Jefferson County District Attorney Tom Maness stated that his office was reviewing the case and could possibly upgrade the original murder charge to capital murder, an offence which warrants either the death penalty or life imprisonment without the possibility of parole under Texas state law. On August 2, 2012, Granger was once again re-indicted by a grand jury for an upgraded charge of capital murder in the killing of Sebolt, and District Attorney Maness expressed that they likely would seek the death penalty for Granger.

While Granger was still awaiting trial for the murder of Sebolt, he and his brother continued to face separate proceedings for the sexual assault of his daughter. In April 2012, a month after he was charged in connection to the shooting, Granger's sexual assault trial was declared a mistrial by District Judge John Stevens due to heightened attention following the incident.

== Trial ==
On April 22, 2013, the capital murder trial of Bartholomew Granger began before a jury in a Galveston County court.

On April 30, 2013, after deliberating for about an hour and 45 minutes, the jury found Granger guilty of the capital murder of Sebolt.

During the sentencing trial, in which the prosecution sought the death penalty, Granger reportedly continued to have angry outbursts in court. At one point, Granger angrily addressed the judge and claimed that his daughter "got what she deserved", and it led to Granger being restrained by the officers in the courtroom. At another point during the proceedings, when the daughter of Sebolt came to court to give her victim impact statement, Granger shouted that he never killed her mother, and outright refused to hear her testimony. Granger even testified on the stand against his lawyers' advice, describing his case as a "mockery of justice" and "lynching", and also showed a yellow pad scribbled with the word "death" to the jurors, and both of these instances led to him being removed from court.

On May 7, 2013, Granger was sentenced to death upon the jury's unanimous recommendation for capital punishment. Lead prosecutor Ed Shettle stated that Granger deserved the death penalty for his heinous actions and lack of remorse, while Sebolt's daughter stated she "couldn’t be happier" with the jury's verdict of death for her mother's killer.

According to The Beaumont Enterprise, the cost of Granger's death penalty trial amounted to more than $370,000.

== Appeals ==
Following sentencing, Bartholomew Granger was transferred to death row at the Allan B. Polunsky Unit, and he was entitled to a mandatory direct appeal to the Texas Court of Criminal Appeals. On June 28, 2014, Granger filed an appeal against his death sentence.

On April 22, 2015, Granger's direct appeal was dismissed by the Texas Court of Criminal Appeals.

On February 24, 2016, the Texas Court of Criminal Appeals remanded Granger's first post-conviction writ to the trial court and rejected the findings of facts and conclusions of law issued by the trial court which recommended Granger's first state post-conviction writ be denied. The Court ordered the writ be adjudicated anew as Jefferson County Criminal District Attorney Bob Wortham's office represented the state in Granger's case. The court ordered Wortham be disqualified from any involvement in Granger's litigation due to a conflict of interest as Wortham is a former judge who presided over Granger's trial; Thomas Roebuck was subsequently appointed as Criminal District Attorney Pro Tempore to represent the State in any future state appeals filed by Granger.

On May 17, 2017, the Texas Court of Criminal Appeals rejected Granger's first state post-conviction writ collaterally attacking his death sentence, which alleged ineffective trial counsel and prosecutorial misconduct.

On November 27, 2017, the United States Supreme Court denied Granger's petition for a writ of certiorari which challenged the denial of state post-conviction relief by the Texas Court of Criminal Appeals.

On February 24, 2023, the United States District Court for the Eastern District of Texas denied Granger federal habeas relief.

On July 30, 2024, the Fifth Circuit Court of Appeals affirmed the denial of federal habeas relief by the federal district court.

On May 19, 2025, the United States Supreme Court denied Granger's petition for a writ of certiorari which sought review of the denial of his federal habeas petition by the Fifth Circuit Court of Appeals.

As of 2026, Granger remains on death row at the Allan B. Polunsky Unit.

== Aftermath ==
Bartholomew Granger was noted to be one of the most infamous criminals in Southeast Texas. By June 2013, Granger was one of five convicts from Southeast Texas to be held on the state's death row.

In 2017, five years after the crime, a security guard who worked at the courthouse was approached to speak about the case, and he described the experience as a terrifying one, and recalled the sight of glass doors and windows breaking with the bullets that entered the courthouse. Sebolt's daughter also spoke about the incident, and revealed that she continued to tell her children stories about their late grandmother. Sebolt's daughter added that she spoke to the daughter and ex-wife of Granger, and they bonded over the incident given that they were impacted by the aftermath of the shooting, and she said she could not forgive Granger for killing her mother.

== See also ==
- Capital punishment in Texas
- List of death row inmates in the United States § Texas
- List of mass shootings in the United States
