= Wayne C. Doty =

American murderer on death row

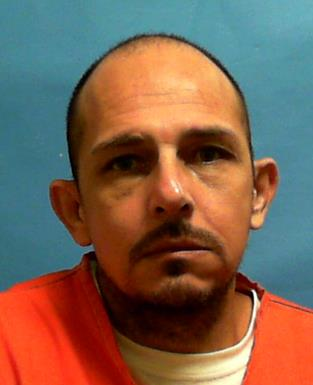
- Mugshot of Doty
- Born: Wayne Charles Doty; April 12, 1973 (age 53); Pueblo, Colorado
- Status: Incarcerated at Union Correctional Institution
- Convictions: First degree murder (2 counts); Armed robbery
- Penalty: Life imprisonment (1997); Death (2013)

Details
- Victims: 2
- Date: April 20, 1996 and May 17, 2011
- Country: United States
- State: Florida
- Date apprehended: 1997, 2011

Wayne Charles Doty (born April 12, 1973) is an American double murderer currently on death row for the May 17, 2011, murder of 21-year-old fellow inmate Xavier Rodriguez.

Doty was sentenced to death after he pleaded guilty to killing Xavier Rodriguez, a fellow inmate he stabbed and strangled to death while he was serving a life sentence for the fatal shooting of Harvey Horne II, a night watchman at a Plant City manufacturing plant during a drug robbery on April 20, 1996. A second prisoner, convicted mass murderer William Edward Wells, was also convicted as an accomplice in Rodriguez's death and sentenced to life without parole, but he was later sentenced to death for killing another prisoner in 2019.

As of July 2026 an execution date has not been set.

== Death sentence ==
Wayne Doty was first sentenced to death on June 5, 2013; that sentence was upheld by the Florida Supreme Court in July 2013. Once Doty's case went back to the trial court that sentenced him for post-conviction appeals, he initially asked the lower court to dismiss his attorney and waive all his appeals. However, in 2016, the United States Supreme Court in Hurst v. Florida declared Florida's capital sentencing laws unconstitutional. The old law called for a majority vote of the jury to sentence a defendant to death. The new law calls for a unanimous jury vote of death in order to sentence a defendant to death. In 2016 Doty's first death sentence was thrown out. He was retried two years later, and the jury unanimously voted to sentence him to death again on May 15, 2018. Although Florida has yet to set Doty's execution date, Doty is the only inmate on Florida's death row who has chosen the electric chair over lethal injection as the preferred method of execution.

On January 16, 2025, the Florida Supreme Court dismissed Doty's appeal.

== Serialisation ==
In 2018, the Netflix program I Am a Killer featured Doty in the 10th episode.

== See also ==
- Capital punishment in Florida
- List of death row inmates in the United States § Florida
