= Sarah Armstrong Mystery series =

2008 novel by Kathryn Casey

Sarah Armstrong Mystery
- Author: Kathryn Casey
- Language: English
- Genre: Detective, Mystery novel
- Publisher: St. Martin's Minotaur
- Publication date: June 2008
- Publication place: United States
- Media type: Print (hardcover)
- Pages: 320 pp (Hardcover edition)
- ISBN: 0-312-37950-1 (First Edition)

The Sarah Armstrong Mystery series is a fictional series created by true crime author-turned-novelist Kathryn Casey, first published by St. Martin's Minotaur in 2008. Booklist magazine named the first novel, Singularity, one of the top ten Best Crime Novel Debuts of 2009.

== Overview ==
The series narrates Texas Ranger Sarah Armstrong, a criminal profiler, as she solves murders. The first book, Singularity, follows Lieutenant Armstrong as she solves the bizarre double murder of a millionaire businessman and his mistress. Killed in a swank Galveston beach house, the pair are discovered in a grotesque intimate pose. Complicating matters is that Armstrong is newly widowed, and neither she nor her daughter handle the loss well. As Armstrong closes in on her suspect, he turns the tables on her and makes her family his new targets.

In 2010, Library Journal picked the third book in the series, The Killing Storm, as Best Books 2010 in the mystery fiction genre, calling it, "Riveting suspense and nifty plot twists in an outstanding series."

== Critical reception ==
Singularity was included on Vanity Fair's "Hot Type" page in its August 2008 issue.

The Houston Press, in a feature about the series and the author, wrote, "After writing half a dozen true-crime books, Houstonian Kathryn Casey decided to step into fiction with Singularity." P.G. Koch with the Houston Chronicle wrote that "Casey deftly switches between investigations, working in Sarah's personal life as well as the interesting minutia involved in following tenuous leads." The Tampa Tribune, in its feature, wrote, "Not since Patricia Cornwell's Postmortem has a crime author crafted such a stellar series debut."

Publishers Weekly, in a review, called Casey's first attempt at mystery writing, with Singularity, "the riveting fiction debut from true-crime journalist Casey."

Midwest Book Review wrote that Blood Lines, the second in the series, was "a fine combination of who done it and who is doing it." Also, Deadly Pleasures magazine named Singularity "Best First Novel of 2008."

Two of the books in the series were chosen as Mystery Guild and Doubleday Book Club selections.

== Titles ==
- Singularity (2008, first in the Sarah Armstrong series)
- Blood Lines (2009, second in the series)
- The Killing Storm (2010, third in the series)
- The Buried (2018, fourth in the series)
