= Melvin White (murderer) =

American executed for murder (1950–2005)

- Born: Melvin Wayne White; January 25, 1950; Howard County, Texas, U.S.
- Died: November 3, 2005 (aged 55); Huntsville Unit, Texas, U.S.
- Status: Executed by lethal injection
- Conviction: Capital murder
- Penalty: Death

Melvin Wayne White (January 25, 1950 – November 3, 2005) was an American murderer executed by the state of Texas by lethal injection. He was convicted of the August 5, 1997 kidnapping, sexual assault and murder of 9-year-old Jennifer Lee Gravell.

== Crime ==
On the night of August 4, 1997, there was a barbecue in the neighborhood of Ozona, Texas where Gravell and White both lived. Some time between 10:30 p.m. and 11:00 p.m. Gravell went to the home of White, who lived two houses down the street from her. She was looking for someone to go for a ride with. He kidnapped her and took her in his truck to a rest area out of the city. There he sexually assaulted her, but she resisted, so White bound her arms behind her back with electrical tape and gagged her with a sock. He would later admit to penetrating her with his finger. He fled the rest area with Gravell after another car arrived. After taking her to another location he killed her by repeatedly striking her head with a tire iron. He dumped her body behind a water tank in a field outside of town.

== Trials and appeals ==
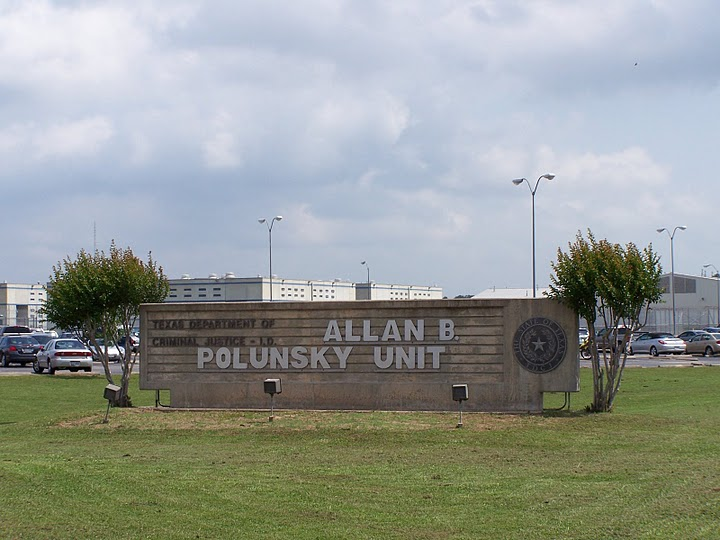
Allan B. Polunsky Unit houses the State of Texas death row for men.

After witnesses reported they had seen White leave his home with a young girl in the passenger seat of his truck, he was arrested and immediately confessed to the crime. He told police where Gravell's body could be found. In a trash can at White's home, underpants, sandals, and a ball of electrical tape with her hair in it were found. On August 15 he was indicted for her capital murder. After being found guilty of Gravell's capital murder on June 10, 1999, he was sentenced to death during the separate penalty phase of the trial on June 14.

White, Texas Department of Criminal Justice (TDCJ# 999317), was received by the prison system on June 21, 1999. While on death row he was held at Allan B. Polunsky Unit (formerly the Terrell Unit) near Livingston, Texas.

As with all death sentences in Texas, it was automatically appealed to the Texas Court of Criminal Appeals, which on January 31, 2001, upheld the sentence and conviction. White appealed for writ of habeas corpus to the trial court, Texas Court of Criminal Appeals and U.S. district court. All were denied. He also filed a motion for a certificate of appealability, which was likewise denied by various courts including the 5th U.S. Circuit Court of Appeals. In October 2005, his appeal to the Supreme Court of the United States for a writ of certiorari was denied.

The Texas Board of Pardons and Paroles voted 6–0 on November 1 to recommend that Governor Rick Perry deny a 90-day stay or a commutation to life imprisonment, which Perry obliged.

It was revealed during the penalty phase of the trial that White had forced his own daughter to perform oral sex on him while penetrating her with his finger when she was 12 years old. He also offered her $50 per week to perform sexual favors for him. When White was between the ages of 10 and 12 he molested a preschool aged relative. Witnesses also said that he would hold parties for teenagers in the area at which he provided alcohol, and where he would grope girls' breasts.

White blamed alcoholism for his actions. He said that at the time of the murder he was drinking half a gallon (2 liters) of vodka every three days, and that did not include what he would drink in bars.

== Execution ==
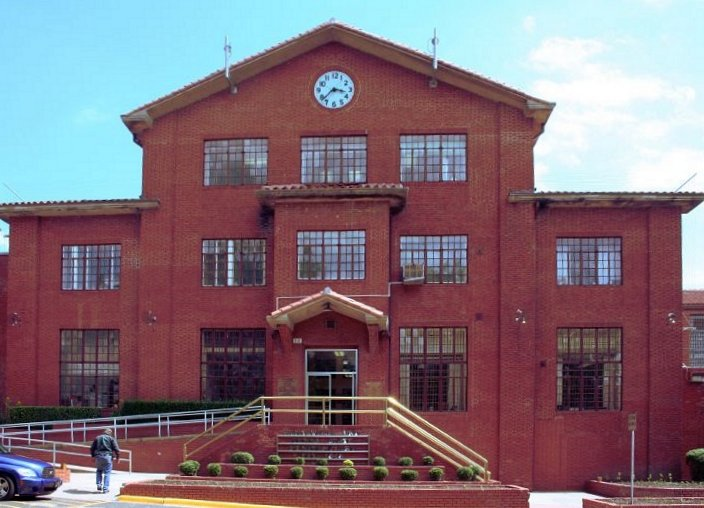
Huntsville Unit, where White was put to death

He was put to death at Huntsville Unit in Huntsville, Texas.

In his final statement, White said:

Tell Beth [the mother of Jennifer Lee Gravell] and them I am sorry, truly sorry for the pain that I caused your family. I truly mean that too. She was a friend of mine and I betrayed her trust. I love you all. Tell Momma I love her. [He recites the Lord's prayer.] All right, Warden, let's give them what they want.

During the injections White said that he could "taste it". He was pronounced dead at 6:21 p.m. CDT. He is buried at Captain Joe Byrd Cemetery.

== See also ==
- Capital punishment in Texas
- Capital punishment in the United States
- List of people executed in Texas, 2000–2009
- List of people executed in the United States in 2005
