= Allan B. Polunsky Unit =

State prison in West Livingston, Texas formerly known as the Terrell Unit

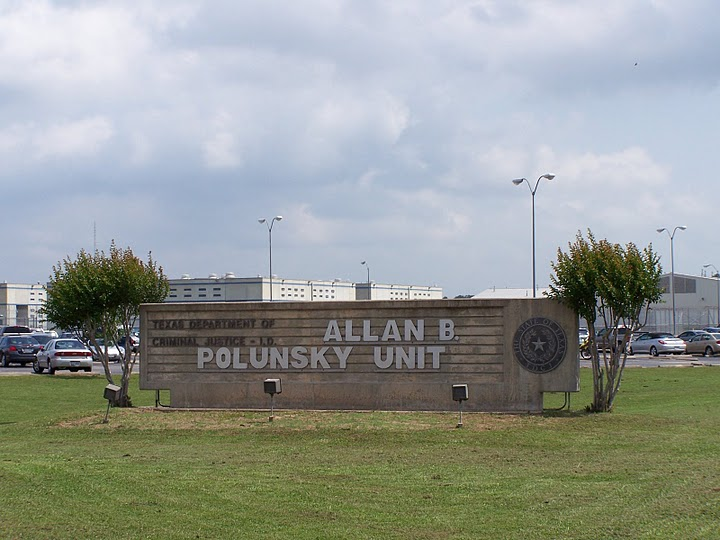

- Location in Texas
- Location: Livingston, Texas; 30°41′56″N 95°00′51″W
- Status: Operational
- Security class: G1-G5, Administrative Segregation, Death Row
- Capacity: 2,984
- Opened: November 1993
- Managed by: TDCJ Correctional Institutions Division
- Warden: Kevin Smith
- Website: www.tdcj.state.tx.us/unit_directory/tl.html

The State of Texas Death Row seal, taken at the Polunsky Unit

Allan B. Polunsky Unit (TL, formerly the Terrell Unit) is a prison in West Livingston, unincorporated Polk County, Texas, United States, located approximately 5 miles (8.0 km) southwest of Livingston along Farm to Market Road 350. The Texas Department of Criminal Justice (TDCJ) operates the facility, that has a maximum capacity of 2,900. Livingston Municipal Airport is located on the other side of FM 350.

Polunsky was named after Allan B. Polunsky, a former chairman of the Texas Board of Criminal Justice and former chairman of the Public Safety Commission, the governing board of the Texas Department of Public Safety.

Polunsky houses Texas' "supermax" units, and is notable for being the location of Texas's death row for men, although executions are conducted at the Huntsville Unit in Huntsville, 60 miles (97 km) to the west.

== History ==
The Polunsky Unit opened in November 1993. At the time of its opening the public did not associate the prison with the death penalty, as the state's male death row inmates were housed at the Ellis Unit near Huntsville. In November 1998 Martin Gurule, a death row inmate in the Ellis Unit, escaped. He drowned in a nearby creek and his body was found a week later.

After the incident occurred, the TDCJ considered moving the death row for men, and the Polunsky Unit was the favored choice for the relocation. According to the TDCJ, the prison escape attempt had hastened the agency's decision to move death row inmates to a new location. TDCJ officials also stated that overcrowding at Ellis was another factor in the death row move. Six months after the escape attempt, the TDCJ decided to move the death row. The Texas Coalition to Abolish the Death Penalty criticized the move of the death row, saying that the conditions of the prisoners were worse than those in their previous location. The Texas Board of Criminal Justice approved the relocation of the men's death row on Friday May 21, 1999.

Polunsky took the death row inmates on Friday June 18, 1999, with the first 55 inmates all classified as being troublesome. The death row transfer, which took ten months, was the largest transfer of condemned prisoners in history and was performed under heavy security.

In February 2000 two death row inmates took a 57-year-old female corrections officer hostage, forcing negotiations involving the warden. One of the hostage-takers, Ponchai Wilkerson (TDCJ#999011), was scheduled to be executed on March 14, 2000, and was, in fact, later executed on that date. The other, Howard Guidry, had no scheduled execution date. Guidry remains on death row.

On May 9, 2000, 33-year-old death row inmate Juan Salvez Soria (TDCJ#837), who was scheduled to be executed on July 26, 2000, pulled the arm of 78-year-old William Paul Westbrook, a prison chaplain from Livingston, into his cell. The offender tied a sheet around the chaplain's arm and tied the other end to a toilet; Soria began cutting Westbrook's arm with a razor blade. The offender nearly tore Westbrook's arm off. The authorities used tear gas to stop the attack. Authorities treated Soria's former cell as a crime scene and moved Soria to a more restricted area within the prison. Soria was executed on schedule.

The Texas Board unanimously approved giving former Terrell Unit its current name, Allan B. Polunsky Unit, on July 20, 2001. The board also voted to rename the Ramsey III Unit in Brazoria County, Texas to the Terrell Unit. The former namesake, a Dallas insurance executive named Charles Terrell, requested the name change because he did not want his name associated with death row because of questions about the administration of the death penalty. In addition he reportedly was ambivalent regarding capital punishment. In exchange, the former Ramsey III Unit was renamed the Terrell Unit.

In 2010, the TDCJ accused five men who were serving life sentences of attempting to break out of the unit. Robert Perkinson, author of Texas Tough: The Rise of America's Prison Empire, said in 2010 that Polunsky "probably" is "the hardest place to do time in Texas." Perkinson added that while the prison is not in a "gloomy" location and that the facility is not "dangerously dilapidated", the prison's "existential problem" is the fact that it is the state death row.

In May 2013 Mother Jones magazine ranked Polunsky as one of the ten worst prisons in the US, based on Congressional testimony from former inmate Anthony Charles Graves (TDCJ Death Row#999127, released due to overturning of conviction on September 7, 2006) and research conducted by the magazine during a three-year period.

In 2025, the unit saw two inmate on inmate homicides, one suicide, and one suspected drug overdose death in the span of two weeks. The deaths prompted a lockdown of the unit alongside eighteen other high security TDCJ units as part of a crackdown against violence and an influx of illegal drugs.

As of 2014 the prison had 691 employees and 2,936 prisoners. As of that year there were 279 men on Polunsky's death row.

== Operations ==
The 584,000-square-foot (54,300 m^{2}) facility has twenty-three buildings, on 472 acres (191 ha) of land. The surrounding area includes fields and forests. It has a capacity of about 2,900 prisoners.

David Casstevens of the Fort Worth Star-Telegram described Polunsky as "a somber complex of putty-gray concrete buildings trimmed in blue on 470 fenced acres." Miriam Rozen of the Houston Press said that the unit "sits amid the same kind of lush, green and hilly East Texas terrain that surrounds Governor Bush's lake house 100 miles to the north in Athens." Marc Bookman of Mother Jones said that the prison "looks as one might imagine a death row would look—a series of imposing concrete structures surrounded by excessive razor wire and four guard towers." Alex Hannaford of The Nation described it as a "bleak, foreboding complex".

The Polunsky Unit was designed to house more problematic and dangerous inmates; the officials designed the unit to be more secure than the older TDCJ units. Throughout its history the unit housed administrative segregation offenders (offenders in solitary confinement due to chronic misbehavior or violence). The building housing death row inmates is separate from the rest of the compound. Polunsky has a kitchen, a medical treatment clinic, psych interview rooms, and classification office space. Robert Perkinson, author of Texas Tough: The Rise of America's Prison Empire, said that Polunsky, a white concrete building with blue steel supports, is "functionally designed and pleasantly asymmetrical" and that a person would mistake the building for a community college "if not for the three-inch window slits."

=== Death row operations ===
As of March 2013 about 290 male death row prisoners are housed in Polunsky. As of March 2013 eight are instead housed in Jester IV Unit, a psychiatric unit near Richmond, Texas. Photographs taken inside death row were provided by the State of Texas in response to a Freedom of Information Act (United States) request filed by attorney Yolanda Torres in 2009.

The death row prisoners reside in Building 12, a two-story facility which opened in 1993 to house administrative segregation prisoners in solitary confinement. This building has three rectangular sections, and a recreational area, in the shape of the circle, is in the center of each section. The death row offenders live in single person, 60-square-foot (5.6 m^{2}) cells, with each cell having a slit window and a concrete door. There is a "tempered air" system intended to keep inside temperatures at 85 degrees Fahrenheit (29 degrees Celsius) or below. The death row buildings have a total of 504 cells. Prior to the relocation of the men's death row, prison authorities held non-death row "administrative segregation" prisoners in these cells. These prisoners were relocated when the men's death row changed locations.

Death row offenders receive no programming and are not allowed to work. Death row prisoners receive meals through bean slots, gates in the cell doors. Whenever an offender is taken from his cell, such as when the offender goes to take a shower, the offender is strip searched. The offenders receive individual recreation in a caged area. Depending on the custody level, death row offenders may be eligible for having radios. Prisoners do not have access to television. In 1999 Larry Fitzgerald, a spokesperson for the TDCJ, stated that prisoners who were going to be moved to the Polunsky death row disliked the fact they would no longer have television services. Death row inmates wear white jumpsuits, and the death row uniforms have the letters "DR" in black on the backs.

Perkinson said that the wait times that the offenders have before execution make the prison stressful for the inmates, visitors, and employees. Jonathan Bruce Reed (TDCJ Death Row #642, now TDCJ#1743674 due to a reduction of the sentence to life imprisonment on November 3, 2011), a death row offender, said that the mentality of the death row unit is "we keep you kenneled until your date." Larry Todd, a spokesperson of the prison, said that "when a person walks on to death row, there is a sense of change. It's just a different atmosphere."

During a US Judiciary hearing on solitary confinement, Anthony Graves, a former prisoner in the death row who was released in 2010, said that conditions were making prisoners lose their sanity. In 2013 James Ridgeway and Jean Casella of Mother Jones stated that "Some have been known to commit suicide or waive their appeals rather than continue living under such conditions."

In This Timeless Time: Living and Dying on Death Row in America, a 2012 book by Bruce Jackson and Diane Christian discusses the Polunsky Unit. According to one passage: "Whenever a condemned prisoner goes anywhere outside his cell, he must back up to the door, drop to his knees, and extend his hands backward through the narrow slot to be handcuffed. Then he stands, turns around, and waits for the door to be opened. The whole process of dropping to the knees and extending the arms backward is particularly difficult and painful for the older convicts with arthritis."

Jackson and Christian point out that the state laws for Texas, and most other states, do not lay out "the specific conditions under which condemned prisoners live."

== Polunsky in the media ==
Polunsky is a setting of the book Blow Fly by Patricia Cornwell.

The popular novel by John Grisham, The Confession, is set around Polunsky.

The Mexican novel Llegada la hora by Karla Zárate talks about a fictional chef cooking the last meals for Death Row inmates in Polunsky. Llegada la hora (Spanish) Paperback: 214 pages; Publisher: Dharma Books (June, 2019); Language: Spanish; ISBN 978-607-29-1624-1

The National Public Radio (NPR) Podcast series Consider This devoted an episode about the death row radio station, The Tank 106.5, based on the reporting of Keri Blakinger for the Marshall Project for The Guardian.

== Notable inmates ==
=== Death row prisoners ===
All death row prisoners on this list are and were under death sentences given by the State of Texas.

==== Executed ====
- Arthur Lee Burton – convicted of the 1997 murder of Nancy Adleman and executed on August 7, 2024.
- Quintin Phillippe Jones – executed on May 19, 2021.
- John William King (murder of James Byrd Jr.) – executed on April 24, 2019.
- John David Battaglia – executed on February 1, 2018.
- Lawrence Russell Brewer (murderer of James Byrd Jr.) – executed on September 21, 2011.
- Peter Anthony Cantu (convicted of the murders of Jennifer Ertman and Elizabeth Peña); transferred from Ellis Unit – executed on August 17, 2010.
- James Lee Clark, executed on April 11, 2007, at Huntsville Unit despite questions of Clark's IQ not meeting mental retardation
- Jeffrey Dillingham – perpetrator of the murder of Caren Koslow, executed November 1, 2000.
- Robert Alan Fratta – executed on January 10, 2023, for masterminding the murder of his estranged wife Farah Fratta.
- James Garrett Freeman – executed January 7, 2016.
- Gustavo Julian Garcia – executed February 16, 2016.
- Humberto Leal Garcia, transferred from Ellis Unit – executed on July 7, 2011.
- Joseph Christopher Garcia (member of the Texas Seven) – executed on December 4, 2018.
- Juan Martin Garcia – executed October 6, 2015.
- Gary Graham a.k.a. Shaka Sankofa – executed June 22, 2000.
- Jesús Ledesma Aguilar – executed on May 24, 2006.
- José Medellín (convicted of the murders of Jennifer Ertman and Elizabeth Peña); transferred from Ellis Unit – executed on August 5, 2008.
- Travis James Mullis – found guilty of murdering his son in 2008 and executed on September 24, 2024.
- Steven Lawayne Nelson – convicted of the 2011 murder of Arlington pastor Clint Dobson and sentenced to death in 2012.
- Donald Keith Newbury (member of the Texas Seven) executed on February 4, 2015.
- Derrick Sean O'Brien (perpetrator of the murder of Jennifer Ertman and Elizabeth Peña); transferred from Ellis Unit – executed on July 11, 2006.
- Michael James Perry – convicted of the murder of Sandra Stotler, suspected of murdering her son James Adam Stotler (age 16) and Arnold Jeremy Richardson (age 18) - executed July 1, 2010.
- Robert Lynn Pruett – executed October 12, 2017, at Huntsville unit.
- Ángel Maturino Reséndiz – executed on June 27, 2006.
- George Rivas (member of the Texas Seven) – executed on February 29, 2012.
- Michael Anthony Rodriguez (member of the Texas Seven) – executed on August 14, 2008.
- Rosendo Rodriguez III (Suitcase Killer) – executed on March 27, 2018.
- Tommy Lynn Sells – executed on April 3, 2014.
- Shannon Charles Thomas – transferred from Ellis Unit and executed on November 16, 2005.
- Richard Lee Tabler, convicted of a 2004 double murder case and suspect of two slayings of teenage girls.
- Edgar Tamayo – executed on January 22, 2014.
- Pablo Lucio Vasquez – executed on April 6, 2016.
- Adam Kelly Ward – executed on March 22, 2016.
- Coy Wesbrook – executed on March 9, 2016.
- Melvin White – executed November 3, 2005.
- Ponchai Wilkerson – executed on March 13, 2000.
- Cameron Todd Willingham – transferred from Ellis Unit – executed on February 17, 2004.
- Steven Michael Woods Jr. – executed on September 13, 2011
- Marvin Lee Wilson – executed on August 7, 2012, at Huntsville Unit.

==== Awaiting execution ====
- Tanner Lynn Horner, convicted of the 2022 kidnapping and murder of Athena Presley Monroe Strand
- Paul Devoe, spree killer who murdered six people in Texas and Pennsylvania in 2007
- William Mitchell Hudson, perpetrator of the 2015 Texas campsite shooting, which left six people dead
- Jason Thornburg, murdered 3 women and 2 men between 2017 and 2021.
- Edgardo Cubas, perpetrator of the 2002 East End murders
- Randy Ethan Halprin (member of the Texas Seven)
- William George Davis – serial killer nurse.
- Bartholomew Granger – murdered a bystander while trying to kill his daughter.
- Howard Paul Guidry, who was convicted of the murder of Farah Fratta by shooting the victim on her husband's orders.
- Ruben Gutierrez, who was convicted and sent to death row for the murder of Escolastica Harrison, a retired schoolteacher, during a robbery in 1998. His execution had been postponed several times due to legal issues and appeals.
- Ronald Lee Haskell, perpetrator of the 2014 Harris County shooting
- Ali Irsan – convicted and sentenced to death for honor killings
- Patrick Henry Murphy Jr. – member of the Texas Seven
- Joseph Andrew Prystash, who was convicted of the murder of Farah Fratta by helping the victim's husband to hire a hitman to kill the victim.
- Rodney Reed
- Robert Leslie Roberson III – convicted of the murder of his daughter in 2002.
- John Allen Rubio, convicted of the 2003 Brownsville child murders
- Víctor Saldaño
- Walter Alexander Sorto, perpetrator of the 2002 East End murders
- Faryion Wardrip – serial killer responsible for the murders of five women between 1984 and 1986.
- Eric Lyle Williams – perpetrator of the Kaufman County murders in which he murdered Kaufman County, Texas prosecutor Mark Hasse, along with Kaufman County District Attorney Mike McLelland and his wife Cynthia. Williams was a former Justice of the Peace who was previously charged with theft. Williams killed Mr. Hasse out of revenge for the guilty verdict he received over the robbery charge, which was brought on by Mr. Hasse.
- Robert Gene Will – convicted and sentenced to death for the murder of police officer in Houston on December 4, 2000.
- Charles Don Flores — convicted of Elizabeth Black's 1998 murder.

Awaiting execution but moved out of Polunsky:

- Andre Thomas – Moved to the Jester IV Unit due to mental health issues

==== Commuted ====
- Kenneth Foster
- Thomas Bartlett Whitaker – Commuted to life in prison
- Anthony Charles Graves – Exonerated

=== Non-death row ===
- Matt Dee Baker – Former pastor convicted of killing his wife and featured in the non-fiction book Deadly Little Secrets.
- Steven Jay Russell – Repeated escapee and con artist, portrayed by actor Jim Carrey in the film I Love You Phillip Morris.
- Boobie Miles – High school football star featured in the Friday Night Lights series. Released from TDCJ in 2018.
- Lyle Brummett – Serial killer
- William Lewis Reece – Serial killer
- Curtis Gambill – One of three perpetrators of the 1996 rape and Murder of Heather Rich. The case experienced renewed attention after Curtis, one of his co-defendants, and a few other inmates escaped custody in 2002, after a 10 day manhunt they were apprehended.

== See also ==
- Capital punishment in Texas
