= Murder of Escolastica Harrison =

1998 robbery-murder of a retired schoolteacher in Texas

Escolastica Harrison
- Escolastica Harrison, pictured in 1986
- Born: Escolastica Cuellar; February 10, 1913; Brownsville, Texas, U.S.
- Died: September 5, 1998 (aged 85); Brownsville, Texas, U.S.
- Cause of death: Stab wounds
- Resting place: Buena Vista Burial Park
- Occupation: Schoolteacher (former)
- Known for: Victim of a robbery-murder case

On September 5, 1998, in Brownsville, Texas, an 85-year-old elderly woman named Escolastica Cuellar Harrison (February 10, 1913 – September 5, 1998) was robbed and murdered by a group of three men, who stabbed her 13 times with two screwdrivers and stole her money. Through police investigations, all three robbers were arrested, but before the trial process, one of them, Pedro Gracia, absconded while out on bail and he remains on the run to this day.

The remaining two murderers still held in custody, Ruben Gutierrez and Rene Garcia, were both tried for capital murder and convicted in 1999; Garcia was sentenced to life in prison while Gutierrez was sentenced to death. Throughout the subsequent years on death row, Gutierrez maintained his innocence and stated that he never killed Harrison in spite of his confession to the robbery, and he is currently appealing against the death sentence. Gutierrez was nearly executed several times before his execution was delayed by appeals in relation to his claims of innocence and other issues.

== Background of victim ==
Escolastica Cuellar, later known as Escolastica Harrison after her marriage, was born in Texas on February 10, 1913. Harrison, a Hispanic-American, dedicated much of her life to education, working primarily as a third-grade teacher at Cromack Elementary School, located in one of the poorest neighborhoods of Brownsville. Her husband, Robert Harrison, died in 1991.

Most of Harrison’s students were the children of migrant workers. As a native Spanish speaker, she placed a strong emphasis on helping them learn English, focusing especially on clear enunciation. She was widely respected for her deep concern for her students' well-being and her unwavering commitment to their success in life.

Harrison was remembered by those who knew her as both a dedicated educator and an active member of her community. She and her husband managed a trailer park that provided housing for immigrant families from Mexico, and she frequently assisted tenants with practical needs, including offering advice, helping with home repairs, and providing essential items when necessary. Her generosity and commitment to supporting others earned her widespread respect and affection. Family members also highlighted her personal warmth and care: her nephew and godson, Alex Hernandez, described her as a consistent giver to the community and fondly recalled summer fishing outings with her, cherishing the joy and guidance she brought into his life.

== Murder ==
In the period leading up to her death in 1998, Escolastica Harrison lived in her Brownsville home with her nephew Avel Cuellar, who frequently assisted her with household tasks. That same year, Harrison was introduced to a Hispanic man named Ruben Gutierrez—a friend of Cuellar’s. Unbeknownst to her, Gutierrez would later become one of the three individuals responsible for her murder.

Ruben Gutierrez, originally from Florida, was 21 years old at the time of the crime. He worked as a security guard at a resort in South Padre Island and was a married father of two. Gutierrez had married his then-pregnant wife at the age of 17. In the months before the murder, he frequently visited Harrison’s home to socialize and drink with her, her nephew, and other friends. He also regularly assisted Harrison with errands and household tasks. A psychiatric evaluation revealed that Gutierrez had grown up in a severely dysfunctional household. Both he and his brother were frequently abused by their father. He began using drugs at the age of 13 and was later diagnosed with post-traumatic stress disorder (PTSD), believed to be a result of the ongoing abuse he experienced during childhood.

According to sources, Ruben Gutierrez devised a plan to rob Harrison after learning that she kept approximately $600,000 in cash at her home—a result of her deep mistrust of banks. On September 5, 1998, Gutierrez put his plan into action. He enlisted the help of two accomplices: 21-year-old Rene Garcia and 33-year-old Pedro Gracia Garza Jr., more commonly known as Pedro Gracia. Together, the three men broke into Harrison’s home with the intent to steal the large sum of money.

While Pedro Gracia remained outside in the getaway vehicle, Ruben Gutierrez and Rene Garcia entered Harrison’s home. Once inside, they confronted Harrison and assaulted her. The duo used screwdrivers to stab Harrison around 13 times. Before fleeing the scene, Gutierrez and Garcia took approximately $56,000 in cash from the home.

== Investigations ==
On the night of September 5, 1998, Harrison was found dead by her nephew, Avel Cuellar, who returned home to discover her lying face down in a pool of blood, with her bedroom ransacked. An autopsy later determined that she died from multiple stab wounds. The medical examiner concluded that two different screwdrivers had been used in the attack, and noted that the victim had sustained defensive wounds, indicating she tried to fight off her attacker.

The police classified the case as a homicide and launched an investigation to gather evidence and identify suspects. Testimonies from Harrison’s nephew and two acquaintances, who had been drinking with both Harrison and Ruben Gutierrez, placed Gutierrez at the trailer park on the night of the murder.

Four days after the killing, Gutierrez voluntarily appeared at a police station for questioning. Initially, he denied being at the trailer park, but he eventually admitted to participating in the robbery. He claimed, however, that he did not kill Harrison, stating that he left the house while she was still alive and that it was Rene Garcia who remained behind. Gutierrez’s confession led to the arrests of his two alleged accomplices, and all three were subsequently charged with murder.

One of the suspects, Pedro Gracia, was granted bail after cooperating with authorities and agreeing to testify against the others. However, in June 1999, Gracia absconded while out on bail and failed to appear at a pre-trial hearing. He was placed on the police’s wanted list and remains at large to this day.

== Trial of Rene Garcia and Ruben Gutierrez ==
Ruben Gutierrez
- Born: June 10, 1977 (age 49); Fort Myers, Florida, U.S.
- Motive: Robbery
- Conviction: Capital murder
- Penalty: Death

Details
- Victims: Escolastica Harrison, 85
- Date: September 5, 1998
- Location: Brownsville, Texas
- Imprisoned at: Polunsky Unit

Rene Garcia
- Born: 1977 (age 48–49); Texas, U.S.
- Motive: Robbery
- Convictions: Capital murder Burglary
- Penalty: Life imprisonment (minimum of 40 years)

Details
- Victims: Escolastica Harrison, 85
- Date: September 5, 1998
- Location: Brownsville, Texas
- Imprisoned at: W.J. Estelle Unit, Huntsville, Texas

While Pedro Gracia remains at large in connection with the murder of Escolástica Harrison, his two accomplices—Ruben Gutierrez and Rene Garcia—were each tried separately in 1999. Both men were charged with capital murder, a charge that carries either the death penalty or a life sentence under Texas law.

Gutierrez was the first to stand trial and, in April 1999, was found guilty of Harrison’s murder. Following two days of jury deliberation, he was sentenced to death on May 12, 1999, by a 12-member Texas state jury.

Rene Garcia, the second to be tried, accepted a plea deal with prosecutors that removed the death penalty as a sentencing option. He pleaded guilty to capital murder and, on June 1, 1999, was sentenced to life in prison. Garcia had a prior conviction for burglary in 1994 and served part of a seven-year sentence. Under the terms of his current sentence, he became eligible for parole after serving at least 40 years, with his earliest possible release date set for September 12, 2038. He is currently serving his life sentence at W.J. Estelle Unit in Huntsville.

== Gutierrez's appeals ==
Following his sentencing in 1999, Ruben Gutierrez appealed both his conviction and death sentence. While he admitted to participating in the robbery, he consistently maintained his innocence in the murder of Escolastica Harrison.

Gutierrez’s first appeal was dismissed by the Texas Court of Criminal Appeals in 2002, and a second appeal was rejected in 2008.

In 2010, his legal team filed a third appeal requesting DNA testing to help determine whether he had been directly involved in the murder. That appeal was also denied by the Texas Court of Criminal Appeals, which later rejected an additional request in 2011. A subsequent appeal to the Texas Court of Criminal Appeals was rejected in 2011.

In 2014, the 5th U.S. Circuit Court of Appeals rejected another appeal from Gutierrez, further upholding his conviction and sentence.

== Execution attempts of Gutierrez ==
By 2018, Ruben Gutierrez had exhausted all avenues of appeal against the death sentence. His execution was scheduled at least six times but ultimately put off due to legal reasons. He remains on death row as of 2024.

=== 2018 ===
Gutierrez's death sentence was originally scheduled to be carried out on September 12, 2018, after a death warrant was approved in April 2018 in his case.

On August 30, 2018, a senior federal judge granted a stay of execution in light of Gutierrez's change of attorney and a pending legal motion.

=== 2019 ===
On May 2, 2019, a second death warrant was released for Gutierrez, re-scheduling his execution to take place on July 31, 2019. However, it was delayed for presumed legal reasons.

Another death warrant was given later that same year, re-scheduling Gutierrez's execution date as October 30, 2019. However, on October 11, 2019, 19 days before the tentative execution date, a clerical error resulted in a stay of execution.

The stay order was eventually overturned in February 2020 after the Texas Court of Criminal Appeals rejected another appeal from Gutierrez for post-conviction DNA testing to prove his claims of innocence.

=== 2020 ===
Shortly after his failed bid for a post-conviction DNA test in February 2020, Gutierrez's execution was once again scheduled to be carried out on June 16, 2020.

Gutierrez's appeal was heard on June 9, 2020, and a stay of execution was granted to Gutierrez after a federal judge found there was merit in Gutierrez's grounds of appeal when he sought time to undergo post-conviction DNA testing to prove his arguments of innocence. Gutierrez also earlier sought to postpone his execution due to disruptions caused by the COVID-19 pandemic.

However, on June 13, 2020, three days after the order was released, it was vacated by the 5th U.S. Circuit Court of Appeals and the scheduled execution of Gutierrez would move forward again.

Ultimately, on June 16, 2020, an hour before Gutierrez was supposed to be executed, his execution was put on hold due to an appeal that challenged a new policy of banning chaplains of any religion from accompanying the convict in an execution chamber.

A further review was ordered in January 2021 to assess Gutierrez's case; U.S. District Judge Hilda G. Tagle further ruled in favour of Gutierrez and stated he should be entitled to post-conviction DNA testing in March 2021.

=== 2021 ===
In June 2021, Gutierrez's execution date was scheduled for the fifth time, and he was set to be executed on October 27, 2021.

On September 16, 2021, the execution was delayed once again, as Gutierrez appealed on the grounds that the state breached his right to religious freedom by not permitting his spiritual adviser to lay hands on him at the time of his execution.

=== 2024 ===
Three years after the last postponement of Gutierrez's execution, a fresh death warrant was issued for the sixth time for Gutierrez on April 16, 2024, scheduling his execution to take place on July 17, 2024. After this, Gutierrez appealed once more to seek a stay of execution, stating that he should be given a DNA testing to prove his innocence. His lawyers argued that the multiple specimens of evidence, including the nail scrapings extracted from Harrison, a loose hair wrapped around one of her fingers and various blood samples from the interior of her house, were untested and it might be crucial to ascertain whether he was innocent of the crime.

On July 17, 2024, about 20 minutes before the scheduled timing of Gutierrez's execution, the U.S. Supreme Court granted Gutierrez a stay of execution to allow him more time to argue about the validity of his conviction and his request for DNA testing to corroborate his arguments of innocence.

Legal experts noted that with reference to Gutierrez's case, it was an unusual outcome since the U.S. Supreme Court rarely granted a stay of execution at the 11th hour before a death sentence was set to be carried out. In response to the stay of execution, the victim's nephew Alex Hernandez was devastated at the turn of events as he desperately wanted closure and the postponement of Gutierrez's execution prolonged his sadness and pain of losing his aunt to someone she befriended.

On October 4, 2024, the U.S. Supreme Court had scheduled a hearing to review the case of Gutierrez. The prosecution had responded to the motion that Gutierrez's request for DNA tests was a tactical ploy to delay his execution and delay tactic and pointed out that there were other pieces of evidence to substantiate Gutierrez's conviction, including his admission to the planning of the robbery and his presence at the time of the murder.

On February 24, 2025, the U.S. Supreme Court heard the appeal of Gutierrez, although the judges were divided in their thoughts over the need for Gutierrez to undergo DNA testing to prove his claims of innocence. On June 26, the Supreme Court granted Gutierrez's appeal allowing him to seek further DNA testing.

== See also ==
- Capital punishment in Texas
- List of death row inmates in the United States § Texas
