= Lyle Brummett =

Convicted American serial killer

- Lyle Brummett c. 1977
- Born: Lyle Richard Brummett; December 26, 1956 (age 69); Kerrville, Texas, U.S.
- Other name: Lyle Richard Stone
- Status: Incarcerated
- Conviction: Murder (2 counts)
- Penalty: 2 life sentences

Details
- Victims: 3 (2 convictions)
- Span of crimes: 1975–1976
- Country: United States
- State: Texas
- Date apprehended: For the final time on February 5, 1977
- Imprisoned at: Ramsey Unit, Rosharon, Texas

Lyle Richard Brummett (born December 26, 1956) is an American serial killer who raped and killed three women in Texas from 1975 to 1976, two with the help of accomplice Allen Ladd Woody. Charged with two of the killings in exchange for testifying against Woody, Brummett had one of the murder charges dropped and was sentenced to life imprisonment.

== Early life and crimes ==
Lyle Richard Brummett was born on December 26, 1956, in Kerrville, Texas. Little is known about his upbringing, but Brummett himself would later claim that he dropped out of high school because he had no interest in studying and couldn't get along with his teachers. Shortly afterwards, he found work driving trucks for lumberyards, and over the years, developed an interest in activities such as sailing, camping, motorcycles and fishing. According to Brummett, his first "outburst" occurred circa 1974 when he was with a girl, and since then, he had visited numerous psychiatrists, but said that they were unable to help him.

His first known crime was an arrest for burglary in July 1975, under the name "Lyle Richard Stone". He was later released, but would later be re-arrested for two rapes and credit card abuse, for which he was let off on $17,500 bond.

== Murders ==
On September 17, 1975, 18-year-old Carol Ann London and 16-year-old Elizabeth "Beth" Pearson had gone out for a ride with the latter's husband's car. Somewhere near Kerrville, the car broke down, and the two girls accepted a ride from Brummett and his 19-year-old friend, Allen Ladd Woody, who had been passing by. The pair were then driven to an isolated pasture 12 miles east of Kerrville, where they were both raped and subsequently strangled by Brummett and Woody. Their bodies were left underneath an oak tree, and their assailants then left the area. The girls' car was found abandoned at a parking lot near the courthouse the next day, and their clothes were found along I-10 by workmen not long after, but no trace of either London or Pearson was found. Despite search efforts by family members and police, their bodies would remain undiscovered until after Brummett's arrest.

A few months after the crime, Brummett moved to Austin and found work as an electrician. On August 15, 1976, he was at the house of 22-year-old Dianne Kathleen Roberts, an unemployed secretary with whom he had become acquainted. Before leaving the house, he loosened a window screen, which he later used to enter the house. He then raped and strangled Roberts, before wrapping her neck with a pillow case and leaving her nude body on the bed. Her body was later found by her boyfriend, rock musician Jesse Sublett, who was returning home from a trip outside of town.

== Prison detention, escape and recapture ==
Just a day after her murder, Brummett was arrested in Travis County based on the testimony of eyewitnesses who had seen him at the house. While awaiting charges for her murder, he admitted that he and Woody had killed two young women the previous year, providing directions to their location. Policemen from Austin drove with him to the indicated place, where Brummett showed them London and Pearson's decomposing bodies. Following these revelations, both Brummett and Woody were charged in the murders, and each housed in a separate county jail to await trial on capital murder charges.

On September 20, while in prison, Brummett and three other inmates accosted a 17-year-old fellow inmate, whom they bound, gagged and forced to perform anal and oral sex on each of them. Brummett was later charged with this crime, while the other three inmates had their charges dropped as each of them was already serving a sentence in prison. During his imprisonment, Brummett offered to turn state's evidence against Woody, in exchange for the prosecution dropping the capital murder charges against him. Plotting to escape from prison, he also claimed to police that he could lead them to the burial site of another victim killed by Woody, supposedly near the Guadalupe River. On February 3, 1977, Brummett, dressed in civilian clothing, was taken along by police to help search for the body, which lasted throughout the night. As it proved fruitless, he was returned to the police station the following morning. Brumett then asked if he could go to the bathroom, and while nobody was paying attention to him, he managed to walk out of the building undetected and escaped into the city.

After authorities noticed that he had gone missing, a state-wide arrest bulletin was issued for Brummett, complete with a description of him and warning citizens that he could be armed and dangerous. As a protective measure, stakeouts were organized at the homes of his sister and wife. While he was on the run, Brummett went to a party, where he drank beer and passed out on a pillow, but was kicked out when the guests recognized him. The next day, he phoned the police from a convenience store and asked that they come pick him up. A few days after this, The Austin American-Statesman staff received a letter penned by Brummett, in which he said that life was a "drag" and he wished to be executed in the electric chair, a sentiment he reiterated when asked in person.

== Trial and imprisonment ==
In April 1977, Brummett was transferred to Fort Stockton, where he would testify against Allen Woody. In his testimony, Brummett claimed that it was Woody, not him, who had raped and strangled Beth Pearson when they had picked up the girls on September 17, 1975, but also admitted that he was solely responsible for the murder of her companion Carol London, claiming he was afraid she would identify them as the killers. As part of a deal with the prosecution, whose case against Woody rested on Brummett's testimony, the latter was not charged in Pearson's death. In April, Woody was found guilty and was sentenced to 99 years imprisonment for the girl's murder.

After the trial, Brummett was moved back to Kerrville, where he stood trial, was convicted and sentenced to life imprisonment for London's murder. Five days later, he was put on trial for the murder of Roberts, and was given another life imprisonment term for her death.

Ever since then, Brummett has been imprisoned at the Ramsey Unit in Rosharon. He has applied for parole on several occasions, but his requests have been denied each time, with the victims' families and victims' right advocates attending each of his parole hearings to convince the parole review board not to release him.

== See also ==
- List of serial killers in the United States

== Bibliography ==
- Jesse Sublett (April 1, 2004). Never the Same Again: A Rock 'n' Roll Gothic. Boaz Publishing Company. ISBN 1893448029.
