= Deadly Little Secrets =

2012 true crime book by Kathryn Casey

- Author: Kathryn Casey
- Language: English
- Genre: True crime, biography
- Publisher: HarperCollins
- Publication date: July 31, 2012
- Pages: 448 pp (Paperback ed)
- ISBN: 978-0062018557

Deadly Little Secrets: The Minister, His Mistress, and a Heartless Texas Murder is a 2012 true crime book written by the non-fiction author and novelist Kathryn Casey and released by HarperCollins about the 2006 murder by Baptist minister Matt Baker of his 31-year-old wife, Kari Baker, and the staging of her death as a suicide.

== Storyline ==
On April 7, 2006, Kari Baker, an elementary school teacher, was found dead in her bed, in the family's bedroom in Hewitt, near Waco, Texas, in what her husband Matt told authorities was a suicide. At the time of her death, Baker, a 38-year-old pastor and father of two young daughters, had been having an affair with the music minister’s daughter. The book explores Baker’s double life, examines the physical evidence against him, and includes 80 interviews with police, attorneys from both sides, family, friends, church, and community members.

Baker was convicted of murder and, in January 2010, was given a 65-year sentence for killing his wife and covering up her murder.

The author interviewed Baker in state prison after his conviction and sentencing.

Upon the book's release, Casey appeared on KABB-TV Fox San Antonio’s “Daytime at Nine” show, telling the host, “Matt Baker almost got away with killing his wife.” Baker had left a typed, unsigned suicide note, and police originally believed it had been written by the wife, who was thought to have died from an overdose of sleeping pills.

The death was ruled a suicide and an autopsy was not ordered by the justice of the peace. The case remained a suicide until local authorities reopened the investigation after the victim's family hired an attorney and private investigators. Then, police began piecing together the clues. Using the evidence gathered, a Texas Ranger encouraged police to file charges against Baker. The case might never have gone to trial if Baker's mistress hadn't told a McLennan County grand jury that Baker had confessed to her that he'd staged the suicide and murdered his wife. Baker was indicted for murder in March 2009.

The book, Casey told the San Antonio Express-News, shows the need for "good, thorough police work at the scene of a suspected suicide." Deadly Little Secrets is the author's seventh true-crime book.

== Film ==
In September 2013, Sins of the Preacher, a film inspired by Casey’s book, aired on the Lifetime television network. The movie stars Gail O'Grady, James McDaniel, Christopher Gartin, Tom Kemp and Taylor Cole.

== Reception ==
True Crime Zine in August 2012 gave the book a five-star review.
