= West Livingston, Texas =

- CDP
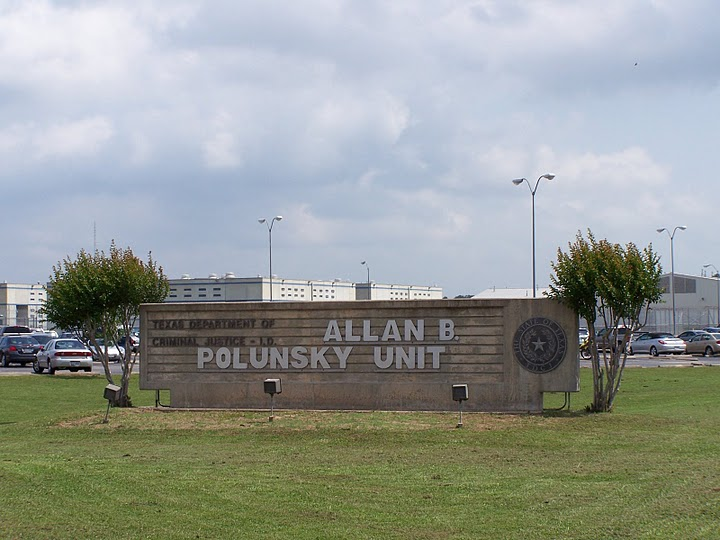
- Allan B. Polunsky Unit

- Coordinates: 30°42′43″N 95°00′08″W
- Country: United States
- State: Texas
- County: Polk

Area
  - Total: 24.0 sq mi (62.1 km^{2})
  - Land: 23.9 sq mi (62.0 km^{2})
  - Water: 0.039 sq mi (0.1 km^{2})
- Elevation: 148 ft (45 m)

Population (2020)
  - Total: 8,156
  - Density: 341/sq mi (132/km^{2})
- Time zone: UTC-6 (Central (CST))
  - Summer (DST): UTC-5 (CDT)
- ZIP code: 77351
- Area code: 936
- FIPS code: 48-77662
- GNIS feature ID: 2409553

West Livingston is a census-designated place (CDP) in western Polk County, Texas, United States, located along the eastern shore of Lake Livingston 6 miles (9.7 km) west of central Livingston. The population was 8,156 at the 2020 census.

== History ==
The development in West Livingston began in the late 20th century. The Handbook of Texas stated that the community was "probably" named after its geographic location.

== Geography ==
According to the United States Census Bureau, the CDP has a total area of 24.0 square miles (62 km^{2}), of which 23.9 square miles (62 km^{2}) is land and 0.04 square miles (0.10 km^{2}) (0.17%) is water.

West Livingston is located on the southeast shore of Lake Livingston and is north of Lake Livingston State Park. It is south of US Route 190.

== Demographics ==
Historical population
| Census | Pop. | Note | %± |
|---|---|---|---|
| 2000 | 6,612 | | — |
| 2010 | 8,071 | | 22.1% |
| 2020 | 8,156 | | 1.1% |
U.S. Decennial Census; 1850–1900 1910; 1920 1930 1940; 1950 1960 1970; 1980 1990 2000; 2010 2020

West Livingston first appeared as a census designated place in the 2000 U.S. census.

=== 2020 census ===
West Livingston CDP, Texas – Racial and ethnic composition Note: the US Census treats Hispanic/Latino as an ethnic category. This table excludes Latinos from the racial categories and assigns them to a separate category. Hispanics/Latinos may be of any race.
| Race / Ethnicity (NH = Non-Hispanic) | Pop 2000 | Pop 2010 | Pop 2020 | % 2000 | % 2010 | % 2020 |
|---|---|---|---|---|---|---|
| White alone (NH) | 3,614 | 4,605 | 3,962 | 54.66% | 57.06% | 48.58% |
| Black or African American alone (NH) | 1,937 | 1,763 | 1,751 | 29.30% | 21.84% | 21.47% |
| Native American or Alaska Native alone (NH) | 14 | 39 | 18 | 0.21% | 0.48% | 0.22% |
| Asian alone (NH) | 24 | 24 | 81 | 0.36% | 0.30% | 0.99% |
| Native Hawaiian or Pacific Islander alone (NH) | 0 | 1 | 0 | 0.00% | 0.01% | 0.00% |
| Other race alone (NH) | 0 | 2 | 24 | 0.00% | 0.02% | 0.29% |
| Mixed race or Multiracial (NH) | 51 | 55 | 191 | 0.77% | 0.68% | 2.34% |
| Hispanic or Latino (any race) | 972 | 1,582 | 2,129 | 14.70% | 19.60% | 26.10% |
| Total | 6,612 | 8,071 | 8,156 | 100.00% | 100.00% | 100.00% |

As of the 2020 United States census, there were 8,156 people, 1,700 households, and 1,223 families residing in the CDP.

As of the census of 2000, there were 6,612 people, 1,494 households, and 1,087 families residing in the CDP. The population density was 276.2 inhabitants per square mile (106.6/km^{2}). There were 2,285 housing units at an average density of 95.4 per square mile (36.8/km^{2}). The racial makeup of the CDP was 66.56% White, 29.93% African American, 0.27% Native American, 0.36% Asian, 1.92% from other races, and 0.95% from two or more races. Hispanic or Latino of any race were 14.70% of the population.

There were 1,494 households, out of which 28.5% had children under the age of 18 living with them, 59.3% were married couples living together, 10.8% had a female householder with no husband present, and 27.2% were non-families. 23.4% of all households were made up of individuals, and 10.3% had someone living alone who was 65 years of age or older. The average household size was 2.49 and the average family size was 2.91.

In the CDP, the population was spread out, with 13.5% under the age of 18, 13.0% from 18 to 24, 42.6% from 25 to 44, 20.1% from 45 to 64, and 10.8% who were 65 years of age or older. The median age was 34 years. For every 100 females, there were 243.7 males. For every 100 females age 18 and over, there were 289.4 males.

The median income for a household in the CDP was $26,732, and the median income for a family was $29,122. Males had a median income of $28,854 versus $21,625 for females. The per capita income for the CDP was $11,160. About 16.1% of families and 19.2% of the population were below the poverty line, including 24.4% of those under age 18 and 9.6% of those age 65 or over.

== Government and infrastructure ==
West Livingston has the Livingston Municipal Airport, operated by the City of Livingston.

The CDP also has the Texas Department of Criminal Justice Allan B. Polunsky Unit, the location of the State of Texas death row for men since 1999.

== Education ==
West Livingston is served by the Livingston Independent School District.

The Texas Legislature designated Polk County as being in the boundary of Angelina College's district.
