= Moss family murders =

1998 family murder in Georgia

- Location: Griswoldville, Jones County, Georgia, United States
- Date: April 23, 1998
- Attack type: Burglary
- Weapon: Handgun
- Victims: Bryan Moss; Kristin Moss; Steven Moss
- Perpetrators: Brandon Rhode; Daniel Lucas

The Moss family murders occurred on April 23, 1998, when 37-year-old Steven Moss and his two children, 11-year-old Bryan Moss and 15-year-old Kristin Moss, were found shot to death inside their home in Griswoldville, Georgia, United States. In the investigation following, police arrested 18-year-old Brandon Rhode and 19-year-old Daniel Lucas, who confessed not long after. Both men were given death sentences in 2000; Rhode was executed in 2010 and Lucas was executed in 2016, both via lethal injection.

== Details ==
=== Moss family ===
Steven Eugene Moss, of Swainsboro, Georgia, left his home state and moved to San Diego, California, where he married a woman named Gerri. They had two children: Kristin Deann Moss in 1982, and Bryan James Moss in 1986. Afterward they moved back to Steven's native Georgia and settled near his family. Kristin was considered pretty, popular, smart, and athletic. She attended Jones County High School and played on their softball team. She was scheduled to graduate in 2001. Bryan attended Mattie Wells Elementary School and was in fifth grade. He was reported to have enjoyed football, baseball, and driving go-karts.

=== Murders ===
On April 23, 1998, Gerri Moss entered her home around 5:30 pm and noticed her daughter, Kristin, sitting in the living room chair. Upon approaching, she noticed her husband Steven laying on the floor with a pillow over his head. Thinking it was a prank, she reportedly said "Okay guys, mommy's home. You can get up now". When she approached Kristin, she saw a bullet hole in her head. Afterward she frantically phoned her husband's uncle Cary, who arrived at the home shortly after. Cary checked the pulses on Kristin and Steven and found both were dead. He also found the body of the youngest family member, Bryan. Cary said that Bryan's face had "been beaten bad, with big bubbles coming out of his mouth". In the investigation afterward, a reward of $4,000 was announced to anyone who could give information leading to an arrest.

== Legal proceedings ==
On April 27, 1998, 18-year-old Brandon Joseph Rhode and 19-year-old Daniel Anthony Lucas were arrested in connection with the case. Items the two took from the Moss's home were found in their respective houses. Both were serial burglars who were found to have burglarized homes in Baldwin, Monroe, Twiggs, and Wilkinson counties, based on items found in their homes. All stolen items were returned to their respective homes. Rhode and Lucas admitted involvement in the Moss murders.

While being held in jail Rhode and another man, 27-year-old Roberto Gonzalez, escaped from the Jones County jail. They were recaptured 12 hours later a few miles from the jail. Lucas went to trial in September 1999 and was convicted. During the penalty phase of the trial, prosecutor Fred Bright exchanged with a defense witness that prisoners frequently escape state prisons. After Lucas was sentenced to death, his attorneys appealed in July 2001 claiming the exchange Bright had with the witness was "like dropping dynamite into the jury deliberations". Rhode was sentenced to death in 2000.

== Executions ==
On September 21, 2010, Rhode attempted suicide by slashing his wrists and throat with a razor blade but was saved by jail guards and recovered at the prison hospital; however, he was executed by lethal injection only six days later, which sparked controversy.

Lucas was executed on April 27, 2016.

== See also ==
- Freeman family murders
- List of people executed in Georgia (U.S. state)
- List of people executed in the United States in 2010
- List of people executed in the United States in 2016

Executions carried out in Georgia
Preceded by Melbert Ray Ford Jr. June 9, 2010	Brandon Joseph Rhode; September 27, 2010	Succeeded by Emmanuel Fitzgerald Hammond January 25, 2011
Executions carried out in the United States
Preceded by Teresa Wilson Bean Lewis – Virginia September 23, 2010	Brandon Joseph Rhode – Georgia; September 27, 2010	Succeeded by Michael W. Benge – Ohio October 6, 2010
Executions carried out in Georgia
Preceded by Kenneth Earl Fults April 12, 2016	Daniel Anthony Lucas; April 27, 2016	Succeeded by John Wayne Conner July 15, 2016
Executions carried out in the United States
Preceded by Kenneth Earl Fults – Georgia April 12, 2016	Daniel Anthony Lucas – Georgia; April 27, 2016	Succeeded by Earl Mitchell Forrest II May 11, 2016
