= Ellis Wayne Felker =

American criminal (1948–1996)

Ellis Wayne Felker (June 1, 1948 – November 15, 1996) was an American criminal who was executed in 1996 in Georgia for the 1981 murder of Evelyn Joy Ludlam, a young woman who was working as a waitress while she attended college.

Felker, who had a prior conviction for beating, raping, and sodomizing a woman, maintained his innocence, and there was considerable controversy about the case. Supporters said that his conviction was based largely on circumstantial evidence.

Felker's defense filed numerous appeals after his trial. Lower courts upheld his conviction, including the US Appeals Court of the 11th Circuit in May 1996. The US Supreme Court denied certiorari in 1985 and 1996. Felker's appeal in May 1996 to the US Supreme Court was considered a test of the new Antiterrorism and Effective Death Penalty Act (AEDPA), which had been signed in April 1996. Using a key provision of the law, the US Supreme Court rejected his petition for habeas corpus in June 1996 by saying that he had not established new evidence to be considered in his second habeas corpus appeal.

Given outstanding issues, four media sources petitioned the Georgia court in 2000 for DNA testing of Felker against evidence recovered from Ludlam's body. Felker was the first subject in the United States for whom the court agreed to post-conviction DNA testing of an executed person. This testing was performed in 2000 under an agreement in which four media sources paid for the testing and collaborated on the distribution of the results. The results were ruled inconclusive.

== History ==
Ellis Wayne Felker was born in Georgia in 1948. He attended local schools. In 1977, he was convicted of aggravated sodomy after sexually assaulting a woman, who was able to escape to call the police, in October 1976. The victim's underwear had been ripped, her jewelry was removed, and her breasts were injured. At his murder trial, Felker later insisted that he did not rape the victim and that the sex in that incident had been consensual. Felker was sentenced to 12 years' imprisonment and was paroled in December 1980. In 1981, he was operating a leather store.

In 1981, a 19-year-old Georgia woman, Evelyn Joy Ludlam, disappeared in Warner Robins, Georgia. She was working her way through Macon Junior College (now part of Middle Georgia State University) as a cocktail waitress at a motel in Warner Robins. Her car was found abandoned at the Macon Mall. Police learned from her landlady that Ludlam had left a note saying that she would be meeting with Felker later on the day that she had last been seen. Felker's neighbor testified to seeing Ludlam's car at his house the day of her disappearance.

According to the police, Felker invited Ludlam to meet with him under the pretense of a job at his leather shop. Joy Ludlam hoped to change jobs because serving as a cocktail waitress did not agree with her religious beliefs. Felker was put under police surveillance for two weeks. Meanwhile, Ludlam's body was found in a creek. She had been raped and murdered by asphyxiation, or strangling. Parts of her body, such as the breasts, were cut.

=== Trial and controversy ===
An autopsy performed for the police initially determined that Ludlam had been dead for five days when found. That finding would eliminate Felker as a suspect because of the police surveillance of him. However, the medical examiner, Dr. Whitaker, later testified at trial and changed the state's findings of time of death. He said that the air temperature, the state of decomposition of the body, the fact that Ludlam had been found wearing the same clothes as when she had last been seen, and the fact that missing and murdered persons are frequently killed soon after they disappear all led him to conclude that Ludlam had died two weeks before her body was found. (That was before Felker was under surveillance.)

The prosecution based its case largely on circumstantial evidence pointing to Felker having met with Ludlam. They said that the case was similar to the sexual crime for which Felker had been convicted in 1977. The strongest physical evidence was hair found on Ludlam's clothes. The State Crime Laboratory said it might have been Felker's, according to microscopic examination of Felker's hair. Similarly, the state held that hair found at Felker's house matched Ludlam's, as did hair in his car. (However, that highly subjective test of microscopic examination of hair is no longer considered scientifically reliable. Improvements in forensic testing have led most states to drop the use of such hair evidence in favor of DNA analysis.)

The defense conducted an independent assessment of the autopsy evidence and report and introduced it at the trial. Felker's expert concluded that Ludlam had died three days before the body was found, which put into question his likelihood as a suspect, since he had an alibi during the period of police surveillance. Felker maintained his innocence for the rest of his life.

After a five-day trial, the Houston County, Georgia jury convicted Felker in 1983 of the rape, murder, aggravated sodomy, and false imprisonment of Ludlam. Given the aggravated circumstances of the crimes, Felker was sentenced to death.

== Appeals and execution ==
Felker's defense mounted several appeals on his behalf. It failed in its appeal for certiorari review by the US Supreme Court after the Georgia Supreme Court had upheld his conviction in 1984. He appealed for collateral relief, which was denied by a state trial court: "the Georgia Supreme Court declined to issue a certificate of probable cause to appeal the denial." The US Supreme Court again denied certiorari, in Felker v. Zant, 502 U.S. 1064 (1992).

The defense filed a petition for writ of habeas corpus in the US District Court on several grounds, including that the state had illegally withheld exculpatory evidence. The District Court denied the petition, a ruling upheld in 1995 by the US Court of Appeals for the Eleventh Circuit, and the US Supreme Court denied certiorari on the decision in 1996.

Felker was originally scheduled to be executed in May 1996. That month, he filed a request for a stay of execution and permission to file a second habeas corpus petition under a new law. A stay was granted while the case proceeded, as the lower courts denied the petition. The US Supreme Court heard his habeas corpus appeal, as a test of the new Antiterrorism and Effective Death Penalty Act (AEDPA), enacted on April 24, 1996. "The act cracked down on Death Row inmates and other state prisoners who file numerous appeals in federal court after losing initial appeals. In June, the court upheld a key part of the law and rejected Felker's appeal."

The US Supreme Court held that Felker's petitions for habeas corpus did not satisfy "the requirements of the relevant provisions of the Act, let alone the requirement that there be "exceptional circumstances' justifying the issuance of the writ." It dismissed the petition for writ of certiorari "for want of jurisdiction." The petition for an original writ of habeas corpus was denied, as the court said that there was not enough new evidence.

Felker's attorneys continued to work on his behalf. In 1995 and 1996, they filed requests under Georgia's Open Records Act to review materials held by the district attorney, and their representative was given a chance to review the records and copy certain portions. After filing in September 1996 for a writ of mandamus with the Georgia Supreme Court, Felker's attorneys received a total of four new boxes of evidence, which the prosecution had recently found in a storage room.

In September 1996, Felker was granted a 40-day stay of execution so that a court could determine if government officials had violated the state open records law in denying him access to records on his case. In late September, the Superior Court in Perry ruled that the government officials had complied sufficiently with Felker's open records request, and "in late October, the Georgia Supreme Court affirmed the ruling." It said that Felker had failed to take advantage of the earlier period to prepare for a hearing and review materials. It also held that "a custodian of public records complies with an ORA request when he grants reasonable access to the files in his custody." The prosecutor was not required to have his office find all relevant documents.

Felker was executed on November 15, 1996, at the age of 48. He was electrocuted in Georgia's electric chair at the Georgia Diagnostic and Classification Center in Jackson, Georgia.

== Post-execution DNA testing and exoneration attempt ==
In July 2000, the Atlanta Journal-Constitution, Boston Globe, Macon Globe, and CBS News announced that they would pay for DNA testing in the Felker case to try to determine if he was innocent. The Chicago Tribune had run a series on inequities in application of the death penalty in Illinois. Concerned that several convicted men had been exonerated, Illinois Governor George Ryan declared a moratorium on executions in the state in 2000 and said that there appeared to be too many inequities in how the penalty was sentenced and administered.

A Middle Georgia judge, Houston County Senior Superior Court Judge L.A. McConnell, ordered evidence in Felker's case to be made available for DNA testing, saying that it was part of the public record. That is believed to be the first time in the United States that a court agreed to post-conviction DNA testing of a person who had been executed after being convicted of rape and murder. By an unusual arrangement, several news sources agreed to pay for the testing and how they would publicize the results.

The results were ruled as inconclusive. The court ruled that the finding alone would not have been enough to grant a new trial to Felker or to result in his exoneration and release.

== See also ==
- Capital punishment in Georgia (U.S. state)
- Capital punishment in the United States
- List of people executed in Georgia (U.S. state)
- List of people executed in the United States in 1996
- Wrongful execution
