= Pablo Lucio Vasquez =

American murderer (1977–2016)

- Born: August 11, 1977; Dawson County, Texas, U.S.
- Died: April 6, 2016 (aged 38); Huntsville Unit, Texas, U.S.
- Status: Executed by lethal injection
- Conviction: Capital murder
- Penalty: Death (March 30, 1999)

Details
- Victims: David Cardenas, 12
- Date: April 18, 1998

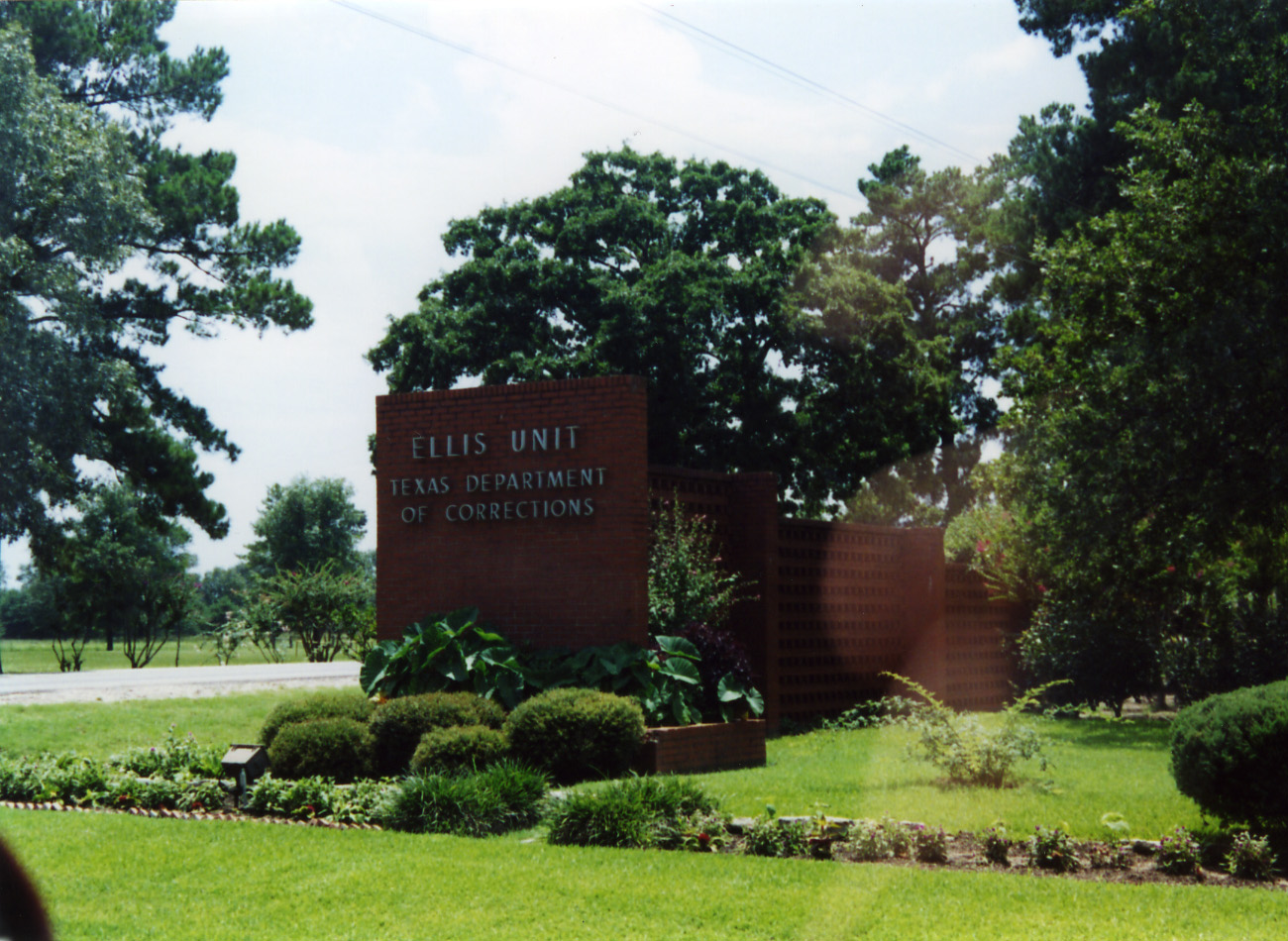
The Ellis Unit housed the State of Texas death row for men until mid-1999.

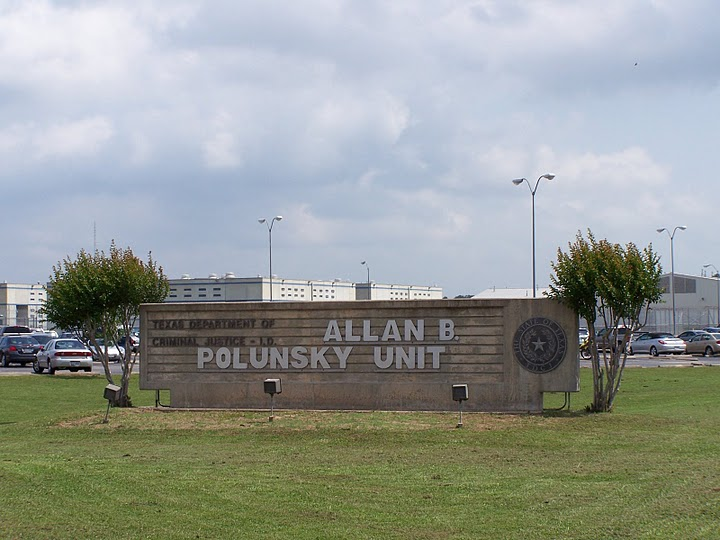
Allan B. Polunsky Unit houses the State of Texas death row for men.

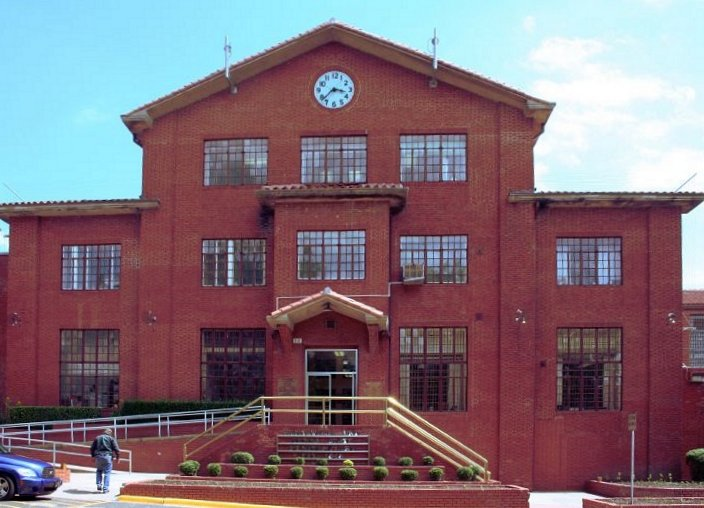
Huntsville Unit, where Vasquez was put to death

Pablo Lucio Vasquez (August 11, 1977 – April 6, 2016) was an American man convicted of the murder of a 12-year-old boy and executed in the U.S. state of Texas. The murder occurred in Donna, Texas, in the state's Rio Grande Valley region.

Due to the way he murdered his victim, Vasquez was called "the vampire killer".

== Background ==
Pablo Lucio Vasquez was born on August 11, 1977, in Dawson County, Texas. He dropped out of school after completing the eighth grade.

David Cardenas, the victim, was a 12-year-old boy who lived in his sister's residence in Alamo, Texas.

== Murder ==
On April 18, 1998, Vasquez went to a party in Donna, Texas, with his 15-year-old cousin, Andres Rafael "Andy" Chapa (born February 7, 1983). During the party he became intoxicated with cocaine and alcohol. At the party he met Cardenas, and while walking from the party to a house, Vasquez hit Cardenas on the head with a pipe and cut the boy's throat. He and Chapa took the body to a field, across a four-lane street, leaving a trail of blood. At the field Vasquez robbed the body of valuables, cut off one arm, severed a portion of another arm, removed skin from Cardenas's back, scalped the body, and drank his blood, before placing the body under pieces of aluminum. Vasquez tried to sever the boy's head with a shovel, but failed. Three relatives of Vasquez and Chapa had attempted to conceal the crime.

== Aftermath ==
Vasquez was arrested in Conroe, Texas, after an anonymous tip. When questioned by police he said that the devil told him to remove Cardenas's head.

Vasquez's trial began in 1999, and his lawyer was James Keegan; Joseph Orendain was the lead prosecutor. Vasquez was convicted and given a death sentence. Chapa received a 35-year sentence after pleading guilty. The relatives who assisted the perpetrators received fines and/or probation, and one was deported back to Guatemala.

Vasquez was received by the Texas Department of Criminal Justice (TDCJ) on March 30, 1999. Initially the men's death row was at Ellis Unit, north of Huntsville, Texas, but in mid-1999 it moved to Polunsky Unit near Livingston, Texas.

Vasquez's lawyer unsuccessfully argued that he should not be executed as he was mentally ill.

Vasquez apologized to the victim's family before he was executed by lethal injection at Huntsville Unit in Huntsville, Texas on April 6, 2016. At the time of his execution, Vasquez was 38 years old, having spent 18 years on Texas's death row.

The execution marked the sixth in Texas and the eleventh in the United States in 2016.

== See also ==
- Capital punishment in Texas
- List of people executed in Texas, 2010–2019
- List of people executed in the United States in 2016

Executions carried out in Texas
Preceded by Adam Kelly Ward March 22, 2016	Pablo Lucio Vasquez; April 6, 2016	Succeeded by Barney Ronald Fuller Jr. October 5, 2016
Executions carried out in the United States
Preceded by Joshua Daniel Bishop – Georgia March 31, 2016	Pablo Lucio Vasquez – Texas; April 6, 2016	Succeeded by Kenneth Earl Fults – Georgia April 12, 2016
