= Tracy Housel =

Bermudian-American serial killer

- Born: Tracy Lee Housel; May 7, 1958; Paget Parish, Bermuda
- Died: March 12, 2002 (aged 43); Georgia Diagnostic and Classification State Prison, Jackson, Georgia, U.S.
- Cause of death: Execution by lethal injection
- Other names: Justin Lee; Tracy Lee; Troy Lee Lane; Robert Allen Young "Yoyo" "Imperial Duncan Yoyo" "Cactus"
- Convictions: Murder; Theft
- Penalty: Death

Details
- Victims: 3 (confirmed); 17 (confessed)
- Span of crimes: February 20 – April 6, 1985 (confirmed)
- Country: United States
- States: California, Georgia, Texas (others possible)
- Date apprehended: April 15, 1985

Tracy Lee Housel (May 7, 1958 – March 12, 2002) was a Bermudian-American murderer and serial killer. Convicted and later executed for murdering a woman in Norcross, Georgia, during a six-week crime spree across four states, Housel was also responsible for at least two other murders and two non-fatal attacks. Shortly before his execution, Housel confessed that he had killed 17 people in his lifetime, a claim which remains uncorroborated.

His case and subsequent execution sparked controversy, as the British government and several advocacy groups attempted to have Housel's death sentence commuted due to his dual nationality and alleged diminished responsibility.

== Crimes ==
=== Confirmed ===
==== Salinas robbery ====
Housel's first notable crime occurred on March 16, 1984, when he robbed 27-year-old Sophia Love Lewis in Salinas, California. He had invited her over to a motel, where he then threatened her with a knife and stole $100 and left. Lewis was able to give a detailed description of him and his vehicle, leading to his arrest only hours later. However, it is unclear if he was ever imprisoned for this crime.

==== Crime spree ====
During his six-week crime spree, Housel, using his job as a truck driver, traveled across various states and visited Western-themed bars or gas stations, presenting himself as a cowboy or member of a biker gang. He befriended both men and women, whom he attempted to kill in isolated locations, either after robbing, sexually assaulting them, or both.

Housel's first confirmed murder with a known date occurred on February 20, 1985, when he picked up South Dakota truck driver Troy Smith somewhere in Texas. After spending most of the night drinking together, he sodomized and then bludgeoned Smith to death with a hammer, before dumping his body at a Union 76 outside Rose City.

On March 30, Housel was at a truck stop in Council Bluffs, Iowa, when he came across 45-year-old Gary Lee Kennedy, who was hitching for a ride to Atlantic. Housel offered to drive him there, but on the way, he pulled out a knife and stabbed Kennedy four times, cut his throat and then left him to bleed out in a ditch near the I-80, stealing his car and wallet beforehand. Kennedy was found by a passer-by and driven to a hospital in Omaha, Nebraska, where he survived his injuries. His car would later be found abandoned in Spartanburg, South Carolina.

On April 3, Housel picked up an unnamed 18-year-old woman from a bar in Phillipsburg, New Jersey, then drove her to an isolated spot near the Freeman School, where he bound, raped and robbed her.

Just three days later, on April 6, Housel found himself at a Union 76 in Lawrenceville, Georgia, where he began conversing with 44-year-old Carolyn Jean Dellinger Drew, a local woman who sometimes sought to speak to strangers to alleviate her loneliness. After leaving the bar together, Housel brought Drew to a driveway in Norcross, where he proceeded to rape, strangle and then beat her to death with a stick. He then stole Drew's credit card and 1981 silver Ford Mustang, and drove to Daytona Beach, Florida, where he was arrested on April 15 after attempting to pay a bill using her credit card. While inspecting his belongings, officers noticed that Housel was missing a ring he was known to wear on one of his fingers, which was later found next to the body of Jean Drew.

=== Disproven and suspected ===
Soon after his arrest, investigators from states around the country began inquiries to see if they could connect Housel to any recent unsolved crimes in their area. As he was last known to reside in Tulare, California, authorities initially suspected that he might be involved in the murder of 44-year-old Dixie Lee Ricks, who had been sexually assaulted and strangled in Visalia on January 28. While the murder shared similarities with that of Drew, investigators were unable to place Housel in the vicinity of the crime and the case went unsolved at the time. In 2010, sex offender Steven Walter Gomez was linked to the Ricks case via DNA, convicted, and sentenced to life imprisonment without parole.

Two other murders for which Housel was investigated took place in Tulare: the 1981 murder of Michael James Morgan and the 1983 murder of Eligio "Eli" Zamorano. On December 30, 1981, 31-year-old Morgan, a truck driver from Lakeside, was resting at a Travelodge when he answered a knock on his door and was fatally stabbed in the heart by an unknown assailant. The latter murder took place on October 31, 1983, when the 29-year-old Zamorano, the head cook of a local Vejar's, was stabbed and beaten to death under unclear circumstances. Authorities at the time noted that both killings shared similarities with the later murder of Troy Smith, but Housel was never officially connected to either killing, both of which remain unsolved.

Housel was at one time considered to be a possible suspect in at least two of the Redhead murders, one of them being that of Espy Pilgrim, but he was ruled out shortly afterwards.

== Trial and death sentence ==
While he had outstanding warrants on various charges in four states, it was first decided that Housel would be tried in Georgia, where the Gwinnett County District Attorney Tom Lawler was seeking the death penalty against him. On the advice of his lawyer, Walt Britt, Housel pleaded guilty to vehicular theft and murder, in exchange for the prosecution dropping the rape charges. Despite this, Lawler still sought the death penalty, as he surmised that Drew's prolonged and painful torture prior to her murder warranted it.

During trial proceedings, the prosecution procured a tape in which Housel willingly confessed and described in detail how he carried out his crimes, with him crying during the recording and whilst it was being played in the courtroom. Notably, he claimed that Kennedy had made unwanted sexual advances at him and that he had stabbed him in self-defense. Kennedy, who was present as a witness, disputed this, claiming that when he asked Housel why he was doing it, Housel guessed that he was "crazy". After this, he showed his scars, pointing out that Housel had stabbed in the chest and slashed his throat.

At the end of the trial, in spite of pleas from his lawyer, mother and girlfriend, jurors agreed unanimously that the death penalty should be applied after an hour and 15 minutes of deliberation. As a result, Justice George Culpepper sentenced Housel to death, as well as 20 years imprisonment on the theft charge. Upon hearing the verdict, Housel sat down in his chair and began to cry. He would never be tried for his other crimes, as prosecutors from those states stated that the death sentence in Georgia satisfied them.

=== Confession and calls for clemency ===
For the next seventeen years, Housel attempted to appeal his death sentence, but was ultimately unsuccessful. As his execution date was scheduled for March 2002, he was visited by John Latty, a deacon and ex-police officer who was one of the people who found Drew's body. He approached Housel with a plea for him to confess to the full extent of his crimes, as in 1986, during an interrogation between the two of them, Housel had broken down in tears and told him that he had killed seventeen people throughout his lifetime. His claims were not without merit, as in 2001, Latty had helped the police in Los Angeles solve the 1985 murder of a transvestite after providing them with testimony from Housel, but no specific details about the case were disclosed.

When notified about his impending execution, Housel's relatives and British officials pleaded with the authorities in Georgia to commute his sentence. Among them were Labour MP for Redcar Vera Baird, Foreign Secretary Jack Straw and attorney Clive Stafford Smith, who argued that Housel - a dual British-American national born in Paget Parish, Bermuda - should be spared because of his abusive childhood, severe case of hypoglycemia and his lawyer's many mistakes during his original trial.

== Execution ==
In the end, Housel's death sentence was finalized and his execution was scheduled for March 12, 2002. On that date, he was executed via lethal injection at the Georgia Diagnostic and Classification State Prison near Jackson, in the presence of approximately 20 witnesses consisting of people involved in his case and civilian observers. His last words consisted of his apologizing to his victim's family, his mother, and ultimately mouthing the Lord's Prayer.

== See also ==
General:

- Nicholas Ingram - another British-American who was also executed by the state of Georgia

Execution:

- Capital punishment in Georgia (U.S. state)
- List of people executed by lethal injection
- List of people executed in Georgia (U.S. state)
- List of people executed in the United States in 2002
- List of serial killers in the United States
