= Brandon Astor Jones =

American criminal (1943–2016)

- Born: February 13, 1943; Indiana, U.S.
- Died: February 3, 2016 (aged 72); Georgia Diagnostic and Classification State Prison, Jackson, Georgia, U.S.
- Cause of death: Execution by lethal injection
- Criminal charge: Murder (June 1979)
- Penalty: Death (October 17, 1979 & September 23, 1997)

Details
- Victims: Roger Tackett
- Date: June 17, 1979

Brandon Astor Jones (February 13, 1943 – February 3, 2016) was an American prisoner who was executed by lethal injection by the state of Georgia on February 3, 2016. Jones, age 72, was the oldest person on Georgia's death row at the time he was executed. During his time on death row, he became a published writer of essays and articles, as well as completing two book-length manuscripts of historical fiction and autobiography.

== Crime and sentence ==
Jones was first condemned to death on October 17, 1979, for his involvement in the felony murder of Roger Tackett on June 17 of that year during a robbery of a Tenneco convenience store, of which Tackett was the manager. Jones was convicted in relation to this murder along with Van Roosevelt Solomon (December 1, 1943 – February 20, 1985), who was executed in 1985 by electrocution at age 41. In 1989, a federal court ordered Jones to be re-sentenced because the jurors who had convicted him had improperly brought a Bible into the deliberation room. He was re-sentenced to death in 1997. In January 2016, Jones' attorneys asked the Butts County Superior Court to stop his execution by challenging the state's injection drug secrecy law, and arguing that the death penalty was too harsh a punishment for his crime. Both arguments were rejected by the court. On February 2, 2016, the United States Court of Appeals for the Eleventh Circuit voted 6-5 not to hear Jones' challenge of Georgia's drug secrecy law. Jones was executed early on February 3, 2016, by lethal IV injection, ten days before his 73rd birthday. The executioner team struggled for 45 minutes to insert the IV into Jones' veins, spending 24 minutes trying to get it into a vein in his left arm, another eight minutes trying his right arm and then they asked a doctor in attendance to insert it into Jones' groin which took 13 minutes. Jones was pronounced dead at 12:46 a.m.

== See also ==
- Capital punishment in Georgia (U.S. state)
- List of longest prison sentences served
- List of people executed in Georgia (U.S. state)
- List of people executed in the United States in 2016

Executions carried out in Georgia
Preceded by Brian Keith Terrell December 9, 2015	Brandon Astor Jones; February 3, 2016	Succeeded by Travis Clinton Hittson February 17, 2016
Executions carried out in the United States
Preceded by James Garrett Freeman – Texas January 27, 2016	Brandon Astor Jones – Georgia; February 3, 2016	Succeeded by Gustavo Julian Garcia – Texas February 16, 2016
