= James Garrett Freeman =

American convicted murderer executed in Texas

- Born: November 12, 1980; Lissie, Texas, U.S.
- Died: January 27, 2016 (aged 35); Huntsville Unit, Texas, U.S.
- Status: Executed by lethal injection
- Motive: To avoid arrest
- Conviction: Capital murder
- Penalty: Death (November 7, 2008)

Details
- Victims: Justin Hurst, 34
- Date: March 17, 2007

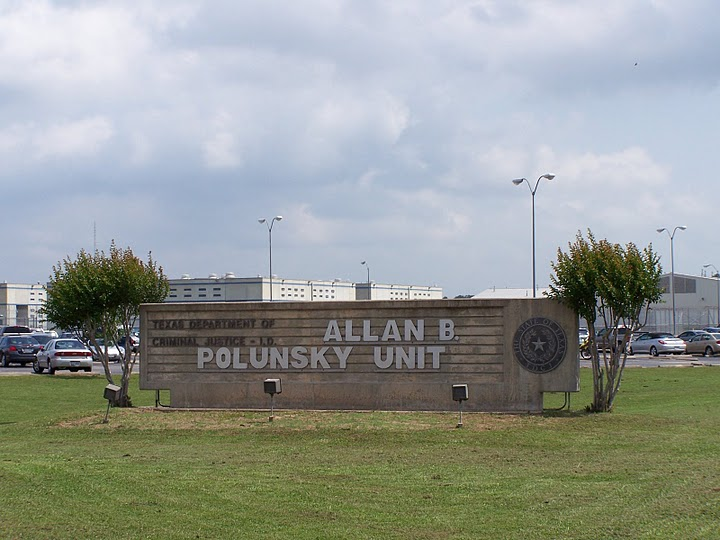
Allan B. Polunsky Unit houses the State of Texas death row for men.

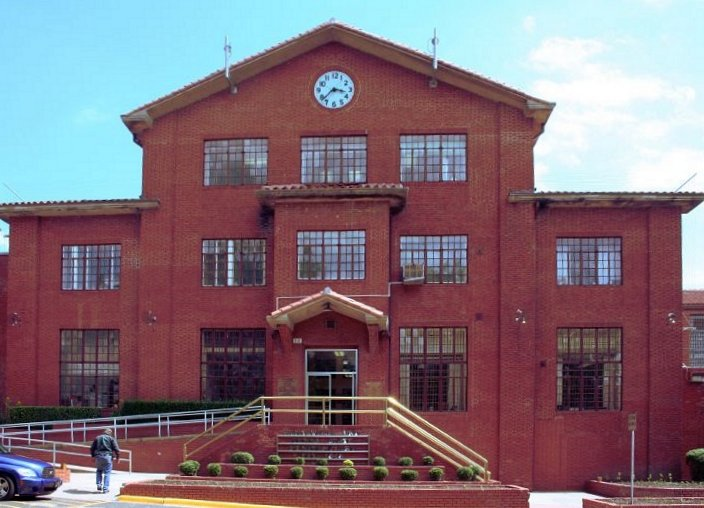
Huntsville Unit, the location of the Texas state execution chamber.

James Garrett Freeman (November 12, 1980 – January 27, 2016) was an American man who was convicted, sentenced to death, and executed for murder in Texas.

Freeman, who was often called by his middle name, originated from Lissie, an unincorporated area in Wharton County, Texas. He was a welder, but was unemployed at the time he committed murder. He had no record of violence. On March 17, 2007, Freeman engaged in a high-speed chase with Texas Parks and Wildlife Department (TPWD) officers. At the Lissie Cemetery, where the chase ended, he fired at TPWD staff with an AK-47 and a Glock pistol. Justin Hurst, a TPWD game warden who had turned 34 that day, was struck twice and killed. Freeman was shot four times and survived.

Freeman, Texas Department of Criminal Justice (TDCJ)#999539, was convicted and sentenced to death. While on death row he was in Polunsky Unit. He was executed at Huntsville Unit on January 27, 2016, nine years after the murder.

The Justin Hurst Wildlife Management Area (WMA) of the TPWD, located in Brazoria County, Texas, was renamed after the victim in 2007. It was formerly the Peach Point WMA.

== See also ==
- Capital punishment in Texas
- List of people executed in Texas, 2010–2019
- List of people executed in the United States in 2016

Executions carried out in Texas
Preceded by Richard Allen Masterson; January 20, 2016	James Garrett Freeman; January 27, 2016	Succeeded by Gustavo Julian Garcia; February 16, 2016
Executions carried out in the United States
Preceded by Christopher Eugene Brooks – Alabama; January 21, 2016	James Garrett Freeman – Texas; January 27, 2016	Succeeded by Brandon Astor Jones – Georgia; February 3, 2016
