= Stephen Anthony Mobley =

Executed American murderer (1965–2005)

Stephen Anthony Mobley (July 13, 1965 – March 1, 2005) was a convicted murderer executed by the State of Georgia for the 1991 killing of John C. Collins, a 25-year-old college student working nights as a Domino's pizza store manager. On appeal, Mobley's attorneys advanced a novel argument that Mobley was genetically predisposed to seeking violent solutions to conflict. The case was described by Nature Reviews Neuroscience as "perhaps the most widely cited case in which defence lawyers used genetic factors in the defence of their client".

== Prior criminal history ==
According to relatives, Stephen Anthony Mobley had been a "difficult" child who had a history of lying, cheating, stealing, vandalizing, setting fires, and being cruel to animals. School records showed further evidence of lying, stealing, destruction of property, use of profanity to teachers, assaults on other students, and expulsions. More serious offenses followed in Mobley's adolescence and by his mid twenties, he had served prison sentences for forgery and began a series of armed robberies.

A number of social workers and psychologists had evaluated Mobley during his youth for possible learning disability or organic brain disorder, and despite finding him "manipulative, self-centered and impulsive," found no evidence of either.

== Crime ==
On February 17, 1991, North Georgia College student John C. Collins was working as the night manager of the Domino's pizza delivery store near Gainesville, Georgia. Mobley robbed the store shortly after midnight and shot Collins in the back of the head.

== Investigation ==
The Domino's robbery was the start of an approximately three-week period in which Mobley committed armed robberies of dry-cleaning shops and restaurants.

On March 13, 1991, Mobley was interviewed by investigators from the Hall County Sheriff's Department and the Georgia Bureau of Investigation. Mobley made a voluntary oral confession to Collins's murder and dictated a written confession. He made further statements on March 14 and 15, including the statement: "The guy I was robbing turned around and looked at me. I said 'don't look at me, face the wall.' I pointed the gun up in his direction and turned my head away and fired."

== Trial ==
On February 16, 1994, Mobley was found guilty of malice murder, felony murder based on five separate underlying felonies, and guilty of those five underlying felonies (armed robbery, three counts of aggravated assault, and possession of a firearm in the commission of a crime.) Mobley, who was 25 years old when he committed the crimes, was sentenced to death after one day of deliberation on February 21, 1994.

== Appeals ==
The strength of the evidence against Mobley was such that his attorneys concluded early on that his conviction was certain and focused on attempting to identify mitigating evidence. "Traditional" mitigating evidence was, however, absent in Mobley's case: he was economically privileged and had no history of physical or sexual abuse. His lawyers argued for clemency on the basis that his family had a disposition toward violence and aggressive behavior. His family tree was analyzed by researchers who were interested in the connection between genetics and criminality. In the course of analyzing Mobley's family, four generations, including uncles, aunts, and a grandfather, were responsible for acts of violence and aggression ranging from serious crimes (including murder and rape) to alcoholism, explosive tempers, antisocial behaviors, and extreme spousal abuse. His attorneys argued that recent research that associated a mutation in the monoamine oxidase A (MAOA) gene with antisocial behavior in a Dutch family with a similar history should be allowed to be considered as mitigating evidence. His attorneys requested that Mobley be tested for this same mutation, but this was denied by the trial judge who held the research was not yet strong enough to show a causal link between any possible genetic mutation and Mobley's behavior.

On appeal, the Supreme Court of Georgia, upheld this denial, finding the trial court had correctly determined that Mobley's scientific evidence was inadequate.

Mobley's father apparently at this point replaced his son's attorneys, dropping the genetic arguments in favor of different lines of appeal. These appeals also failed.

On February 25, 2005, the State Board of Pardons and Paroles denied a clemency appeal supported by the family of John Collins. Pointing out that the sentencing option of Life imprisonment without parole was not available in 1994, the board was asked to commute Mobley's death sentence. This was supported by affidavits from six of the remaining ten trial jurors who said they would have voted for life in prison without parole if it had been an option. Mobley's attorneys for this clemency hearing included former state Attorney General Mike Bowers, who had argued to uphold the death sentence in prior appeals.

== Execution ==
Mobley was executed by lethal injection at the Georgia Diagnostic and Classification State Prison on March 1, 2005. Mobley's execution was delayed by legal appeals right up to the last moment. Minutes before the scheduled 7:00pm execution time, the Supreme Court issued a temporary stay to review these final appeals. At 7:25 p.m., after the high court had denied the appeals, Mobley was prepared by prison officials by strapping him to a gurney and affixing a needle that would deliver the mixture of drugs designed to stop his heart. At 7:50 p.m., he made a short statement: "I would be remiss not to acknowledge and make amends to my family and friends. There are those who say I'm a bigger man than I used to be; I appreciate that. The opportunity I've been given I want to atone for what I've committed." The lethal injection quickly followed. Mobley's eyes blinked rapidly, then slowed. At 7:56 p.m., they fluttered once, and remained closed. Two physicians pronounced the 39-year-old dead shortly afterwards.

== See also ==
- Capital punishment in Georgia (U.S. state)
- Capital punishment in the United States
- List of people executed in Georgia (U.S. state)
- List of people executed in the United States in 2005
