= Coy Wayne Wesbrook =

American mass murderer

- Born: February 1, 1958; Houston, Texas, U.S.
- Died: March 9, 2016 (aged 58); Huntsville Unit, Texas, U.S.
- Other name: Elvis
- Spouse: Gloria Jean Coons (m. 1995; div. 1996)
- Status: Executed by lethal injection
- Motive: Jealousy
- Conviction: Capital murder
- Penalty: Death (September 2, 1998)

Details
- Victims: 5
- Date: November 13, 1997
- Location: Channelview, Texas
- Weapon: .30-06 hunting rifle

Coy Wayne "Elvis" Wesbrook (February 1, 1958 – March 9, 2016) was an American mass murderer, convicted for the killing of five people in Channelview, Texas, on November 13, 1997. Wesbrook fatally shot his ex-wife, Gloria Jean Coons, her female roommate, and three men during a party at Coons' home in an apparent fit of jealous rage.

Wesbrook was sentenced to death in 1998, and was executed by lethal injection in 2016.

== Marriage and divorce ==
On July 5, 1995, Wesbrook and Gloria Jean Coons were married. However, they had already lived together years before their marriage. In November 1997, they divorced, but Wesbrook wanted forgiveness. He attempted to reconcile with Coons by attending the party. At the time of his crime, he had one daughter.

== Murders ==
According to Wesbrook, on November 12, he went to visit his ex-wife, Gloria Coons, at her home in Channelview, Texas, in the Greater Houston area. He was invited to a party at Coons' apartment along with other friends, Diana Ruth Money, and three other males. Wesbrook had gone there with hopes of rebuilding the relationship with Coons, but went into a rage when the party's attendees began to mock him because Coons had cheated on him in the bedroom. At some point in the evening, Wesbrook noticed that his ex-wife and two of the men had slipped away, and when he went into the bedroom, he found Coons having sex with both of the men. While they were mocking him Cruz stole his keys and hid them in his pants, preventing him from leaving. He was able to get his keys back and he left. A very short time later he returned in his truck and pulled out his .30-06 hunting rifle and returned to the residence. After bringing the gun into the room, the attendees continued to torment him. Money threw a can of beer at Wesbrook, which discharged the rifle, killing her. After he fired at her, Cruz and Rogers ran toward him and he fired at them too. He then entered the room where Hazlip and Coons were having sex, and fatally shot them both.

=== Witnesses ===
At about 2 a.m., a neighbor heard the gunfire, grabbed a cell phone, went next door, saw the corpses, and called 911. Wesbrook was arrested at the scene, and it is unknown whether his testimony is accurate or not. There were two witnesses that called 911. The first witness lived upstairs and heard Wesbrook kick open the door and fire off two shots. Knowing exactly what the sound was the neighbor called 911 and while on the line, the dispatcher heard the other three shots ring out.

== Victims ==
- Gloria Jean Coons, 32 (ex-wife)
- Antonio Cruz, 35
- Anthony Rogers, 41
- Diana Money, 43
- Kelly Hazlip, 28 (died from his injuries 5 days after the shooting)

== Trial and conviction ==
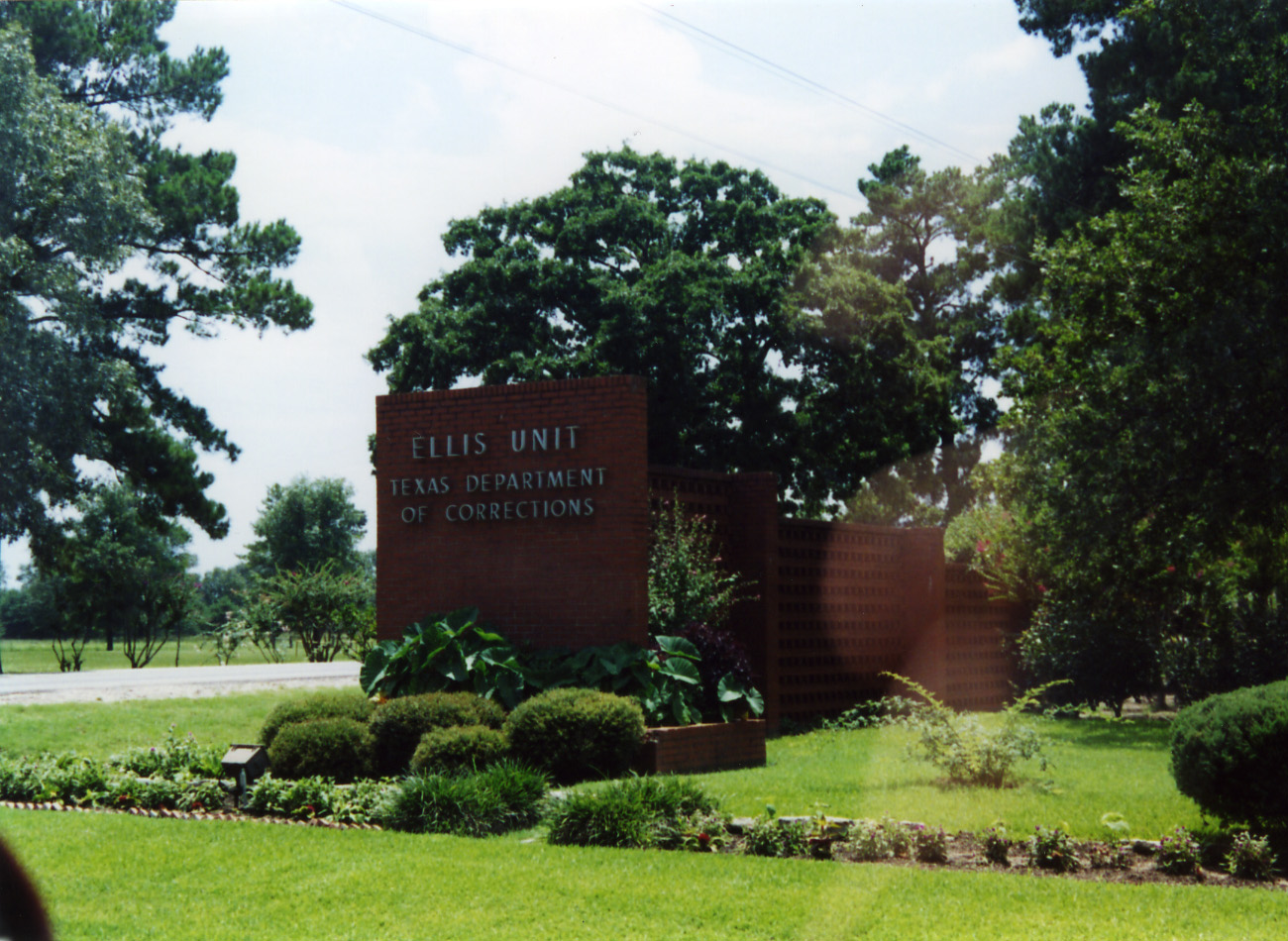
The Ellis Unit housed the State of Texas death row for men until mid-1999.

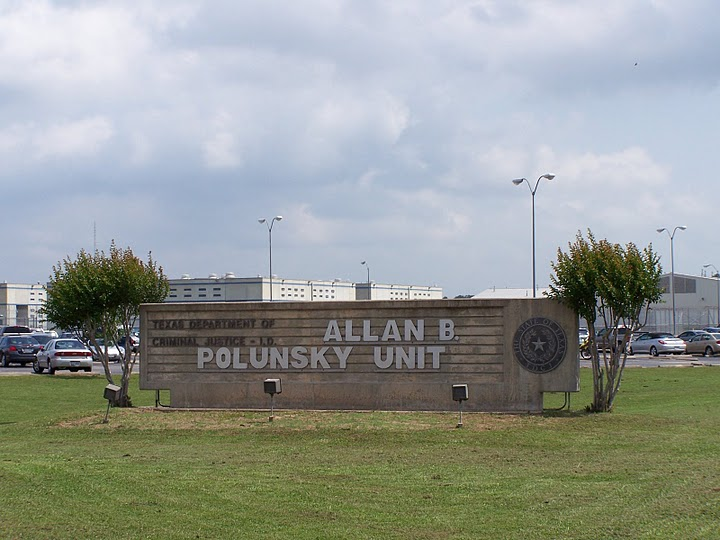
Allan B. Polunsky Unit houses the State of Texas death row for men.

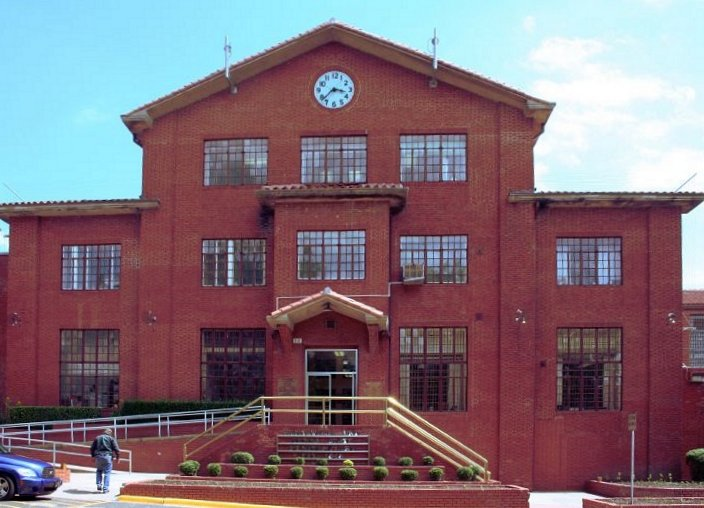
Huntsville Unit, where Wesbrook was put to death

Wesbrook's trial only went on for 11 days before a verdict was reached. At his trial, he admitted to killing the victims, but he claimed that he did not intend to kill anyone, and said that he killed the victims in a fit of rage. On August 13, 1998, Wesbrook was sentenced to death by lethal injection.

Despite his low IQ and the disputed testimony of Dr. George Denkowski, Wesbrook was denied another trial in 2007. Wesbrook was executed by lethal injection on March 9, 2016, and was pronounced dead at 8:04 p.m. Before being executed, he said his last words, which were "I'm sorry I can't bring everybody back. I wish things could have been a lot different".

== See also ==
- Capital punishment in Texas
- List of people executed in Texas, 2010–2019
- List of people executed in the United States in 2016

Executions carried out in Texas
Preceded by Gustavo Julian Garcia February 16, 2016	Coy Wayne Wesbrook; March 9, 2016	Succeeded by Adam Kelly Ward March 22, 2016
Executions carried out in the United States
Preceded by Travis Clinton Hittson – Georgia February 17, 2016	Coy Wayne Wesbrook – Texas; March 9, 2016	Succeeded by Adam Kelly Ward – Texas March 22, 2016
