= Adam Kelly Ward =

American convicted murderer executed by Texas, US

- Born: August 11, 1982; Commerce, Texas, U.S.
- Died: March 22, 2016 (aged 33); Huntsville Unit, Huntsville, Texas, U.S.
- Cause of death: Execution by lethal injection
- Conviction: Capital murder
- Penalty: Death (June 2007)

Details
- Victims: Michael Walker, 44
- Date: June 13, 2005
- Weapon: .45 caliber pistol

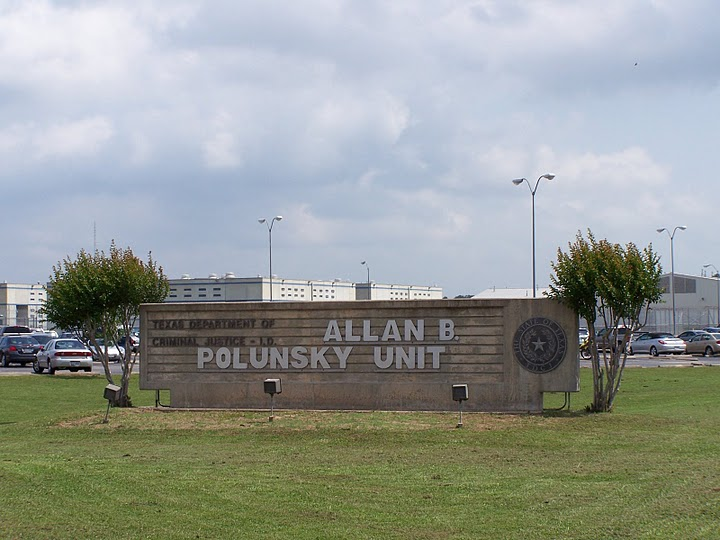
Allan B. Polunsky Unit houses the State of Texas death row for men.

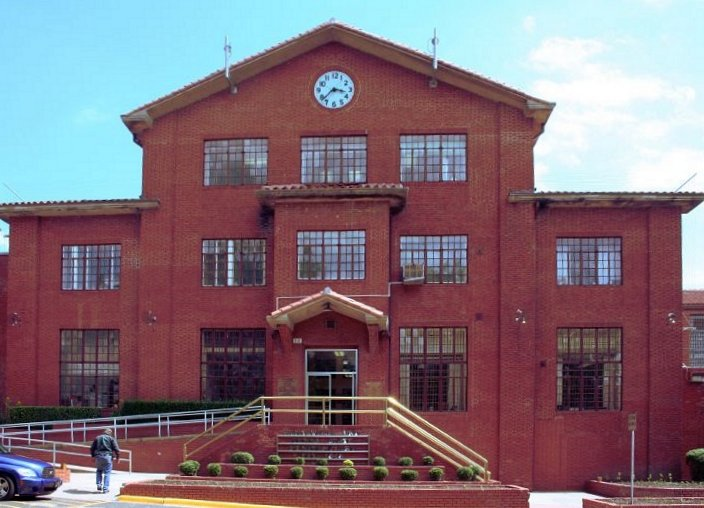
Huntsville Unit, where Ward was put to death

Adam Kelly Ward (August 11, 1982 – March 22, 2016) was an American convicted murderer executed by the U.S. state of Texas by lethal injection.

== Early life ==
Ward was born in the North Texas city of Commerce, Texas, located just under an hour from Dallas, TX to Dr. Ralph Ward, an industrial engineer, and Nancy Ward, who worked in banking and as a staff member in higher education. Adam Ward attended the public schools in Commerce and was diagnosed from an early age of having behavior disorders as well as learning disabilities such as dyslexia. Both his parents and teachers noted that while Ward was clearly intelligent, his behavioral issues were a detriment to his education. After high school, Ward briefly attended Paris Junior College, but dropped out. In the few days preceding the murder, Ward had lost a job that according to his father, he very much enjoyed and was hoping to turn into a career.

== Murder ==
On June 13, 2005, while washing his car, Adam Ward encountered Michael Walker, a 44-year-old code enforcement officer, taking photographs of Ward's home in Commerce, Texas. Ward's home had been frequently cited by the City of Commerce for numerous code violations over the previous five years. Walker taking pictures agitated Ward, according to testimony. Walker then had a brief encounter with Ward, who advised him to leave the area. Walker went to his truck, moved it to the opposite side of the street and called the police, while Ward ran to his bedroom and returned outside with a handgun, and started to fire at Walker. He chased Walker while he retreated behind his truck according to witnesses, and tried to hide behind and under it. When Walker tried to run down the street, Ward shot him again, making for a total of nine shots fired at Walker. Walker's father, Dick Walker, was serving with the Commerce Emergency Corps and arrived on the scene shortly before his son died.

== Victim ==
The victim was 44-year-old Michael "Pee Wee" Walker. Walker had been a construction worker before being hired by the City of Commerce as a code enforcement officer. Walker lived with his father, Dick Walker, a funeral director who owned and operated a funeral home in Commerce. Walker also had two children, a son Donavon and a daughter Marissa who lived with him and his father in Commerce.

== Trial ==
Ward was charged with murder in obstruction/retaliation, making him eligible for the death penalty. While a pretrial inmate, Ward was held in the Hunt County Jail. His capital murder trial began in June 2007 under District Attorney F. Duncan Thomas. Ward's attorneys pleaded not guilty and Ward claimed he acted in self defense as he claimed Walker was a threat to him. His attorneys presented information to the court that claimed that Ward was mentally ill and had delusions. Hunt County prosecutors alleged Ralph Ward instilled paranoia in his son against governmental institutions in the Commerce area, including the city government, the Commerce Independent School District, and the Commerce Police Department. Ralph Ward had previously been involved in a public feud with Commerce ISD over the education methods used to teach Adam and he sometimes appeared at his schools unexpectedly. There was a history of confrontations between Walker and the Wards, and Adam said he felt afraid for his safety. Walker was unarmed when Ward killed him. After the trial, Ward was convicted and sentenced to death.

== Execution ==
Ward, Texas Department of Criminal Justice (TDCJ) 999525, was held on men's death row at the Polunsky Unit near Livingston, Texas. He was executed on March 22, 2016, at the Huntsville Unit in Huntsville, Texas. Ward stated: "This is wrong what's happening," he said. "This is not a capital case; it never was a capital case; I had never intended to do anything. A lot of injustice is happening in all this. I'm sorry things didn't work out. May God forgive us all." A spiritual adviser and three friends of his attended his execution; his parents did not attend it. Ward was pronounced dead at 6:34 CT, 12 minutes after the drugs started to flow.

== Aftermath and Reaction ==
Numerous anti-death penalty advocates condemned the execution, citing it as unconstitutional due to claims that Ward was mentally ill. Commerce police Chief Kerry Crews, who attended the execution, said it was a tragedy for both families, and that hopefully the execution could "provide closure so that they can move on." Dick Walker later filed a civil suit against the City of Commerce and The Ward Family for wrongful death, and settled out of court. The City of Commerce then sued Ralph Ward in an attempt to gain permission to demolish the home, as it had already been declared condemned. In the fall of 2019, The City of Commerce had the Ward house demolished and the property lot cleared.

== See also ==
- List of people executed in Texas, 2010–2019
- List of people executed in the United States in 2016

Executions carried out in Texas
| Preceded by Coy Wayne Wesbrook March 9, 2016 | Adam Kelly Ward; March 22, 2016 | Succeeded by Pablo Lucio Vasquez April 6, 2016 |
Executions carried out in the United States
| Preceded by Coy Wayne Wesbrook – Texas March 9, 2016 | Adam Kelly Ward – Texas; March 22, 2016 | Succeeded by Joshua Daniel Bishop – Georgia March 31, 2016 |
