= Murder of George Crooks =

1984 murder of a lawyer by his male lover in Georgia (U.S. state)

George Crooks
- Born: George Grant Crooks c. 1956; Georgia, U.S.
- Died: March 26, 1984 (aged 28); Atlanta, Georgia, U.S.
- Cause of death: Fatal stab wounds and blunt-force trauma to the head and neck
- Education: University of Georgia School of Law
- Occupation: Lawyer
- Known for: Victim of a murder-dismemberment case
- Partner: Robert Dale Conklin (his killer)
- Family: Jim Crooks (brother)

On March 26, 1984, in the U.S. state of Georgia, 23-year-old Robert Dale Conklin, a resident of Illinois who was then out on parole for armed robbery and burglary, murdered his homosexual lover, a 28-year-old lawyer named George Grant Crooks, by stabbing him to death with a screwdriver. He then chopped up Crooks's body into pieces and disposed of the parts. Conklin was found guilty of murdering Crooks and sentenced to death on June 16, 1984. Conklin was incarcerated on death row for about 21 years before he was executed via lethal injection on July 12, 2005, after he lost his plea for clemency.

== Murder ==
Prior to the murder of his lover in March 1984, 23-year-old McDonald's manager Robert Dale Conklin, a native of Illinois who was then out on parole after serving three years of a six-year jail term for armed robbery and burglary, first met his homosexual lover George Grant Crooks at a highway rest-stop, and they became romantically involved shortly after their first meeting. At the time of the couple's first meeting, Crooks was a graduate of the University of Georgia Law School and he was then working for a Marietta law firm, and he was an aide to the former Atlanta Congressman Elliott H. Levitas.

On March 26, 1984, Conklin and Crooks went to the former's apartment in Atlanta, where the pair of them became intimate and also smoked marijuana together. Crooks, who took his codeine medication, stayed overnight at Conklin's apartment. According to prosecutors, Conklin lured Crooks over to his apartment and killed him by stabbing him to death with a screwdriver. Afterward, in order to conceal his crime, Conklin decided to dispose of Crooks's body by dismembering it. Conklin purchased cleaning supplies and tools for the disposal. He first dragged Crooks's body into the toilet to drain away all the blood. He then used a steak knife and other various types of knives to chop up the corpse of Crooks into pieces, and he packed up the body parts into trash bags and disposed of them outside his apartment. Similarly, Crooks's belongings were thrown away outside the apartment. After he completed the disposal of evidence, Conklin fled to Miami, Florida.

Meanwhile, on March 27, 1984, Crooks's family and friends reported him missing, after they failed to contact him throughout the day, and Crooks's father found that his son's apartment was empty and his car had also disappeared.

On March 28, 1984, two days after the murder of Crooks, a maintenance man was collecting aluminum cans from the dumpster outside Conklin's apartment when he stumbled upon the trash bags containing Crooks's severed body parts. Upon making the gruesome discovery, the maintenance man called the police, who arrived and retrieved the body parts for post-mortem examinations. Various knives, bloodstained bedclothes, screwdrivers, rope, as well as Crooks's credit cards, a wallet, and documents were recovered from the dumpster.

Fulton County Associate Medical Examiner Saleh Zaki conducted an autopsy on the body parts, and he found a total of eight stab wounds on the right side of the victim's neck were inflicted before death. Additionally, there was a stab wound in the left ear area that pierced the upper part of the ear and not only did it cut through the ear canal, the wound extended into the left mastoid area, which was also antemortem. Furthermore, several bruises around the head and neck were consistent with blunt-force trauma, indicating that the head had been struck by a blunt object. There were also two antemortem stab wounds on the lower right side of the neck, with one penetrating the left lung. Dr. Zaki concluded that death resulted from stab wounds to the chest and neck, with blunt-force trauma to the head and neck being a contributing factor.

== Conklin's trial and appeals ==
Robert Dale Conklin
- Born: February 16, 1961; Illinois, U.S.
- Died: July 12, 2005 (aged 44); Georgia Diagnostic and Classification State Prison, Georgia, U.S.
- Cause of death: Execution by lethal injection
- Convictions: 1981; Armed robbery Burglary; 1984; Malice murder
- Penalty: Six years' imprisonment (1981); Death (June 16, 1984)

Details
- Victims: George Grant Crooks, 28 (deceased); Unnamed robbery and burglary victims
- Date: 1981 (burglary and armed robbery); March 26, 1984 (murder)
- Locations: Fulton County, Georgia
- Imprisoned at: Georgia Diagnostic and Classification State Prison

Soon after the murder, police investigators managed to link Robert Dale Conklin as a prime suspect in the murder, after they found a card written with the name of Conklin's parole officer, which was among the body parts discovered outside the dumpster of Conklin's apartment. Conklin, who went on the run at this point, was placed on a wanted list by state authorities of Georgia after a warrant for his arrest was passed.

A grand jury indicted Conklin for the murder and dismemberment of George Grant Crooks in his absence on April 3, 1984, and a warrant for his arrest was issued. Since the date of the offense, Conklin remained on the run until April 8, 1984, when he was arrested at a restaurant near to his apartment in Georgia soon after he returned from Florida on April 8, 1984. Conklin was appointed with a public defender to represent him in his trial. The increasing phenomenon of ex-convicts committing crimes while out on parole, notably Conklin and John D. Pope (who served only eight years out of a life sentence), who gunned down a pharmacist in Arizona, raised the concern and need to regulate laws to better handle the parole system.

Under Georgia state law, the offense of murder carried either the death penalty or life in prison without the possibility of parole. The prosecution also expressed their intention to seek the death penalty for Conklin, who was set to stand trial on June 11, 1984, and the Fulton County Superior Court Judge John Langford approved the prosecution's decision while dismissing a defense motion against the prosecution's move. Prior to this, the defense also filed a pre-trial motion and argued that the photographic evidence of the dismembered body parts should be suppressed as they were "inflammatory and gruesome" and the dismemberment, which took place after the murder, had no relevance in Conklin's trial, which was solely pertaining to malice murder. The defense also claimed that the searches around his apartment were illegal and the evidence found should not be admitted.

Subsequently, two months later, Conklin stood trial before a jury at Fulton County Superior Court. During his trial, Conklin denied that he deliberately killed Crooks. He claimed that on the night itself, while they were together in his apartment, Crooks had attacked him and wanted to sodomize and rape him, and it caused him to act in self-defense and kill Crooks. Conklin stated that he feared the incident might lead to the revocation of his parole order should it be exposed. Therefore, he decided to dismember Crooks' body, pack the parts into ten garbage bags, and dispose of them. The defense argued that Conklin should not be convicted of murder, given that he acted in self-defense and he never had the intention to kill despite resisting the attempt by Crooks to rape him. On the other hand, the prosecution argued that Conklin had murdered Crooks in his sleep and also highlighted the multitude of factors that would warrant a conviction for murder in Conklin's case.

On June 15, 1984, the 12-member jury (eight men and four women) issued their verdict, finding Conklin guilty of the murder of Crooks after less than an hour of deliberating over the case. The prosecution sought the death penalty during the sentencing trial of Conklin, on the grounds that Crooks was brutally murdered by Conklin, who dismembered his body, and they labeled his acts of butchering Crooks's corpse into pieces as those committed by a person with "depravity of the heart and mind", and there was no ounce of compassion and humanity displayed by Conklin during the dismemberment and killing of Crooks, which the prosecution described as "one of the most violent and brutal crimes to come about in this county in recent history". The defense argued in return that the dismemberment was not a depraved act as it was to conceal the crime and dispose of the evidence, and it should not be the reason for Crooks to be executed.

On June 16, 1984, the day after his conviction, the jury returned with their sentencing verdict after three hours of deliberation over two days, recommending that Conklin should be sentenced to death for murdering Crooks.

In January 1985, Conklin filed an appeal to the Georgia Supreme Court and asked to overturn his death sentence by claiming the murder of Crooks was a killing done out of self-defense, but the appeal was dismissed in June 1985. Subsequently, the U.S. Supreme Court also heard another appeal from Conklin, but it was similarly dismissed in December 1985.

In 2004, Conklin once again appealed to vacate his death sentence, but the 11th Circuit Court of Appeals dismissed his appeal.

== Conklin's execution ==
During his incarceration on death row, Robert Dale Conklin spent his time attending church services behind bars, and he also managed to complete a bachelor of arts program offered by Western Illinois University.

On June 27, 2005, Georgia's Attorney General Thurbert E. Baker announced that a death warrant for Robert Dale Conklin was authorized by the Superior Court of Fulton County. In the execution order, Conklin was scheduled to be executed via lethal injection on July 12, 2005, and a seven-day window was set starting from this date to facilitate his execution.

In a final attempt to escape the gallows, Conklin filed an appeal for a stay of execution and stated that his death sentence was imposed without full due process and made claims to oppose his impending execution, but the 11th Circuit Court of Appeals refused to defer his execution date. Additionally, the Georgia Supreme Court and U.S. Supreme Court also rejected Conklin’s request for a stay of execution.

Conklin additionally submitted an appeal for clemency to the state parole board of Georgia, seeking to commute his death sentence to life imprisonment. Fulton County District Attorney Paul Howard said in response to the clemency hearing that he felt Conklin deserved to be executed.

On July 12, 2005, several hours before he was slated to be executed, the state parole board refused to grant Conklin clemency and confirmed his death sentence.

On the evening of July 12, 2005, 44-year-old Robert Dale Conklin was officially put to death via lethal injection at Georgia Diagnostic and Classification State Prison. For his last meal, Conklin ordered a filet mignon steak wrapped in bacon; de-veined shrimp sautéed in garlic butter with lemon; a baked potato filled with sour cream, chives and bacon bits; corn on the cob; asparagus with hollandaise sauce; a buttered French baguette with goat cheese; cantaloupe; apple pie; vanilla bean ice cream and iced tea. Prison officials confirmed that Conklin was able to finish his meal and cleaned two plates. Conklin's last meal order was said to be one of the most expensive last meal requests prepared by the various penitentiary systems of the U.S.

In response to the execution of his brother's killer, George Crooks's 56-year-old older brother Jim Crooks stated that the case should come to a close after 21 years of appeal. He wanted Conklin to pay the ultimate price for murdering his brother, and Jim reportedly stated to the press that "enough is enough".

Conklin was the third person to be executed in Georgia in 2005, and Conklin's execution was the 39th documented execution to happen in Georgia since 1976, the year when capital punishment in the United States was restored via the 1976 ruling of the Gregg v. Georgia case.

Conklin's case was published in a 2022 book written by Dylan Frost, titled Last Meals - The Final Suppers of Serial Killers & Murderers, which covered the last meal requests of some of the most vile and infamous killers in history and their crimes, and Conklin's case stood out due to his unusually refined meal choices compared to the others' usual orders of fast food.

== See also ==
- Capital punishment in Georgia (U.S. state)
- List of people executed in Georgia (U.S. state)
- List of people executed in the United States in 2005
