= Alday family murders =

1973 murder of a family in Georgia, U.S.

- Location: Donalsonville, Seminole County, Georgia, U.S.
- Date: May 14, 1973
- Attack type: Mass murder, burglary, robbery, rape
- Victims: Richard Miller, 19; Jerry Alday, 35; Ned Alday, 62; Jimmy Alday, 25; Aubrey Alday, 57; Chester Alday, 32; Mary Alday, 26
- Perpetrators: Carl Junior Isaacs; George Elder Dungee; Wayne Carl Coleman; William Carroll Isaacs
- Verdict: Guilty
- Convictions: Felony first-degree murder
- Sentence: Death (Carl Isaacs); Death; commuted to 6 consecutive life sentences with possibility of parole after 15 years (Coleman); Death; commuted to 3 consecutive life sentences (Dungee); 40 years' imprisonment (Billy Isaacs)

The Alday family murders took place on May 14, 1973, in Donalsonville, Georgia, United States, a small town in Seminole County, Georgia, when six members of the Alday family were murdered by four men who burglarized a family home.

Earlier in May 1973, 19-year-old Carl Isaacs, 26-year-old Wayne Carl Coleman, and 35-year-old George Elder Dungee escaped from a prison in Maryland. They joined with Isaacs' younger brother, 15-year-old William Carroll "Billy" Isaacs, to drive to Florida so the three escapees could avoid recapture. Prior to the drive to Florida, the four kidnapped and murdered 19-year-old Richard Miller in Pennsylvania, presumably so they could steal Miller's car.

The four passed through Georgia on their way to Florida. On May 14, 1973, they stopped at the home of Jerry and Mary Alday to steal gasoline and decided to burglarize the house to search for valuables. As several Alday family members began to return home during the burglary, starting with Jerry and Ned Alday, the four burglars held each Alday family member at gunpoint to force them inside the house, after which they shot each victim to death. In all, six Alday family members – five men (Jerry, Ned, Jimmy, Chester, and Aubrey Alday) and one woman (Mary Alday) – were murdered that day. The family members were also robbed, and Mary Alday was raped.

The Isaacs, Coleman, and Dungee fled to Alabama after the murders but later moved to West Virginia, where police apprehended them. The four faced trial in early 1974, and Billy Isaacs avoided a death sentence by testifying for the state against his associates. Carl Isaacs, George Dungee, and Wayne Coleman were each sentenced to death, although Dungee and Coleman later had their death sentences commuted to life imprisonment after retrials in the late 1980s. Carl Isaacs was executed by lethal injection on May 6, 2003, eight days away from the 30th anniversary of the murders. At the time of his execution, Isaacs was the longest serving death row inmate in United States history.

Until Mark Orrin Barton's mass murder of nine people in two Atlanta-based day trading firms in 1999, the Alday family murders were the second deadliest mass murders in Georgia history, only surpassed by the Woolfolk family murders from the 19th century.

== Background ==
The Alday family had been established in their Seminole County farming community near the Chattahoochee River for over 100 years prior to the murders. A surviving Alday family member, Bud Alday, who was Ned Alday's brother, the uncle of several of the murder victims, and was largely considered a "spokesperson" for the family in the aftermath of the murders and ensuing trials, stated that the family had a good reputation in the area, were involved in the Baptist Church, and were close-knit, despite rumors of internal strife amongst several Aldays regarding division of the large amount of property they owned. At least two of the younger Alday murder victims were deacons at the Spring Creek Baptist Church, which Ned had helped construct years prior. The Aldays were active in their church, as one was the chairman of the board of deacons, one was the Sunday school superintendent, Chester was the song leader, Jimmy was the training union director, and Jerry was the church clerk and treasurer.

Ned was the father of Jerry Nelson Alday, Jimmy Cecil Alday, and Chester Addis Alday, and the brother of Aubrey Alday. Jerry was married to Mary Alday (née Campbell). The family's traditional routine involved Ernestine, Ned's wife, preparing lunch for the men while they worked on the family farm, while Mary Alday worked at her occupation in Donalsonville. At the time the burglary that preceded the murders initially took place, the Alday men were outdoors working on the farm.

At the time of the murders, Ned Alday was approximately 62 years old; Aubrey was around 57; Jerry was approximately 35 years old; Chester was approximately 32; Jimmy was approximately 25; and Mary Alday was approximately 26.

=== Perpetrators ===
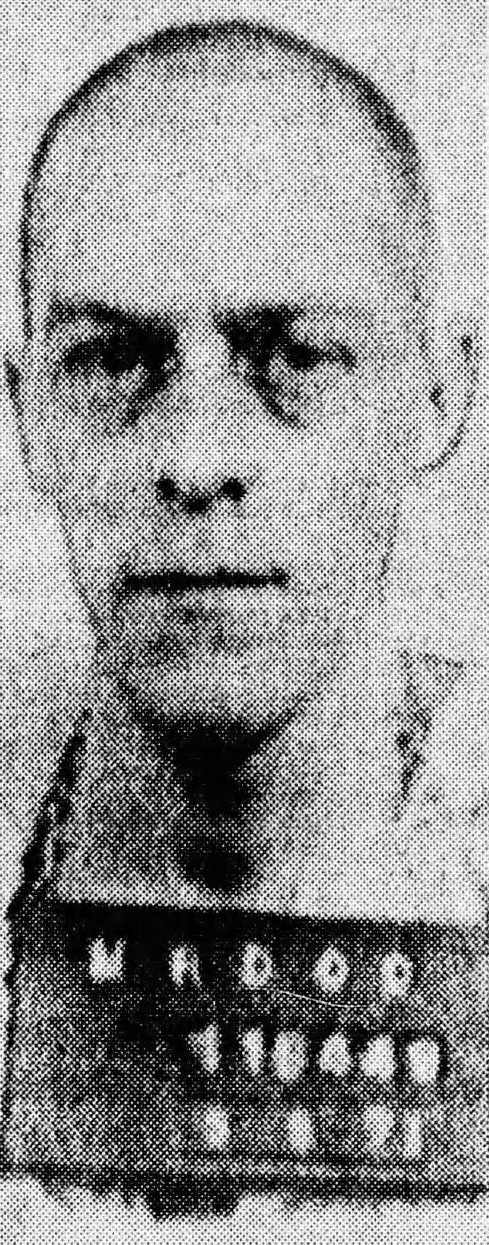
Wayne Coleman

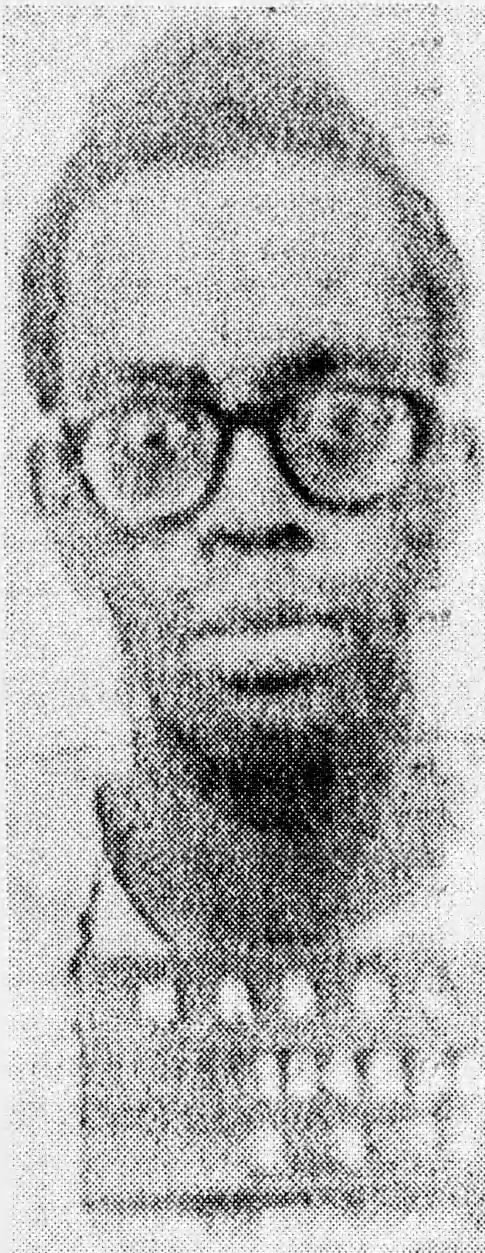
George Dungee

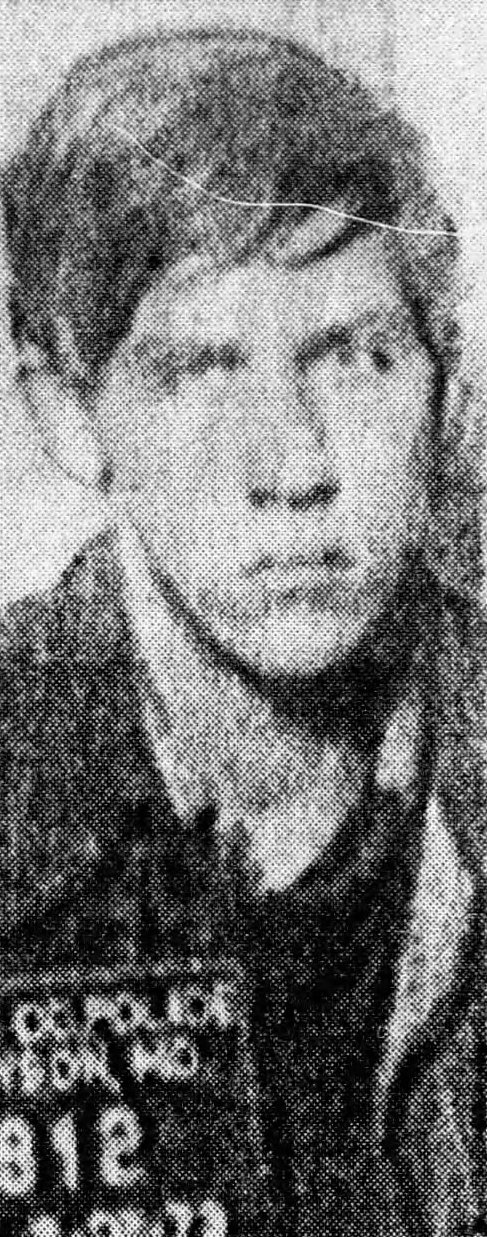
Carl Isaacs

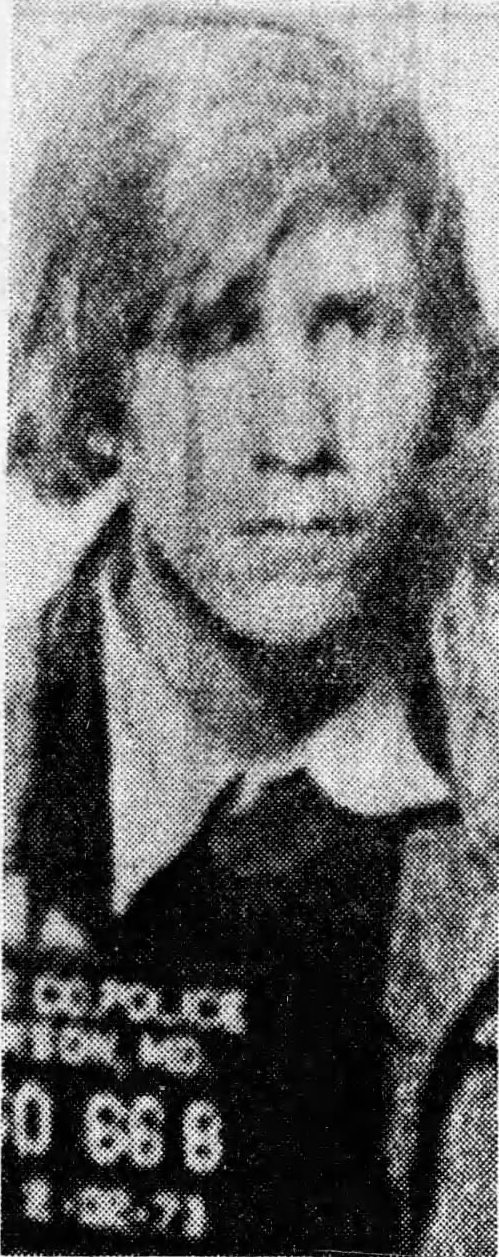
Billy Isaacs

The four perpetrators, photographed in separate mugshots by the Maryland Department of Corrections between 1971 and 1973, before the May 14, 1973 Alday family mass murders

Wayne Carl Coleman was born on December 9, 1946, in the township of East Nottingham, Pennsylvania. Coleman was a half-brother of Carl and Billy Isaacs and related to the Isaacs by their mother; Coleman was the last of five children born to Betty Jamison Isaacs and Carson Coleman, the latter of whom abandoned the family shortly after Wayne Coleman's birth. As a young adult, Wayne Coleman worked several low-paying construction jobs. When Coleman was 21 years old, he began accumulating his own criminal record with a burglary conviction. Later, he was sentenced to 10 years' imprisonment for a separate robbery and sent to prison, but after demonstrating good behavior, he was transferred to the Poplar Hill Prison Camp, a minimum-security reentry facility, where he met and befriended George Dungee.

George Elder Dungee was born on March 5, 1938, in Baltimore, Maryland. Dungee had a minor intellectual disability and wore glasses for myopia. His father died when he was six months old, so he was raised largely by a single mother, Fannie Dungee. Fannie Dungee worked 16 hours a day in a vegetable canning plant and often had trouble finding babysitters for her son, who frequently went truant during his schooling years. When Dungee was in his mid-20s, he identified as a gay man, but he had a girlfriend anyway, a waitress who worked at the same restaurant where Dungee was employed as a dishwasher. They had a daughter together and lived as a family unit in Baltimore for a few years while Dungee moved between jobs, since he was fired frequently for slow work performance, until his girlfriend broke up with him and requested child support. Dungee then moved back in with his mother, but eight years later, he was arrested due to owing $1,600 in child support after not having made any of his payments of $5 USD per week, and sentenced to 18 months in prison. He was sent to the minimum-security Poplar Hill Prison Camp, where he met Carl Isaacs and Wayne Coleman.

Carl Isaacs was born to Betty Isaacs and her second husband, George Archie Isaacs, on August 9, 1953, in Fawn Grove, Pennsylvania; he was the third of seven children born to George Archie Isaacs. His younger brother, William Carroll Isaacs, more often went by the nickname "Billy" and was four years younger than Carl Isaacs. When Carl and Billy Isaacs were young, their father deserted the family, leading the Isaacs children to grow up in a home that Maryland prison officials characterized as "a nightmare of social instability." Growing up, Carl and Billy Isaacs lived in several locations near the border between Maryland and Pennsylvania, frequently making extra money in farming and factory jobs and frequently switching schools. At some point, Carl and Billy Isaacs were placed in foster care because their mother was rarely home due to long work hours. Carl and Billy Isaacs developed a juvenile criminal record consisting of convictions for truancy, running away from foster homes, petty crime, and several stints in reform school. Billy Isaacs' first arrest occurred when he was five years old and a police officer caught him shoplifting, after which the police officer spanked him as corporal punishment, although their mother Betty recalled that the boys were "like any other boys" until they hit puberty, at which point they began burglarizing homes.

When Carl Isaacs was fifteen years old, he received his first adult conviction when he was found guilty of car theft and housebreaking. He was arrested several times between the ages of 16 and 19 for burglary. In February 1973, he was sentenced to four years' imprisonment for burglary and sent to the Metropolitan Transition Center in Baltimore. On March 29, 1973, Carl was assaulted and gang-raped by older inmates during a prison riot that took over his cell block, leading prison officials to transfer him to the Poplar Hill Prison Camp for his safety. There, he reunited with his half-brother Wayne Coleman, who introduced him to George Dungee. Coleman and Carl Isaacs planned an escape from Poplar Hill after deciding they would likely not be paroled from their sentences early, and Coleman convinced Carl Isaacs to allow Dungee to join them in their escape. Meanwhile, Billy Isaacs had been sent to the Victor Cullen School for Boys, a reform school located in Sabillasville, Maryland, after an arrest and juvenile conviction for burglary. In April 1973, Billy Isaacs escaped from that reform school.

In 1981, a reporter based out of Albany, Georgia, would allege that Carl Isaacs had participated in a total of 13 murders in his life before his imprisonment on death row, including the six Alday murders and the death of Richard Miller.

At the time of the Alday family murders, Carl Isaacs was 19 years old, and his brother Billy was 15 years old. Wayne Coleman was 26, and George Dungee was 35 years old.

== Crimes ==
=== Prison escape and murder of Richard Miller ===
At approximately 3:00 am on May 5, 1973, Carl Isaacs, Coleman, and Dungee escaped the Poplar Hill facility by crawling out of a dormitory bathroom window. Poplar Hill authorities did not alert local police of the jailbreak because the escaped inmates were not adjudged dangerous at the time. Somehow, Wayne Coleman also obtained a .38-caliber pistol. After hiding in the woods for some time, the trio stole a car and drove it to Baltimore, where they picked up Billy Isaacs from his girlfriend's house and decided to head towards Florida because Wayne Coleman wanted to see "the ocean." First, they drove west into Pennsylvania, where, on May 10, they kidnapped 19-year-old Richard Wayne Miller in McConnellsburg so they could steal his Chevrolet Chevelle. They drove into Flintstone, Maryland, where Coleman dragged Miller out of the car and murdered Miller by shooting him in the head. Miller's body was discovered on June 3, 1973, almost one month later.

=== Alday family murders ===
While the Isaacs brothers, Coleman, and Dungee drove through south Georgia in Miller's stolen vehicle, the four saw what looked like a gas pump on Ned Alday's property at approximately 4:00 pm on May 14, 1973. The pump was actually an irrigation pump and could not be utilized to refill their vehicle's gas, but upon discovering Jerry Alday's mobile home on the property was unoccupied, Coleman and Carl Isaacs burglarized the mobile home to steal valuables; Dungee and Billy Isaacs eventually joined them. The first members of the Alday family to arrive at the property were Ned and Jerry, both of whom were unaware of the ongoing burglary. Their arrival startled the four burglars, who then held Ned and Jerry at gunpoint and robbed them before shooting both "execution style" in separate bedrooms; Coleman shot Ned Alday, while Carl Isaacs shot Jerry Alday. Ned survived Coleman's initial gunshot wound to the head and attempted to fight Coleman before Carl Isaacs fatally shot him at least five more times.

Jimmy Alday arrived shortly thereafter on a tractor and entered the home, at which point Carl Isaacs murdered him by shooting him in the head in the living room. Mary Alday drove up to the mobile home in a separate vehicle, and Carl Isaacs forced her inside as well while Aubrey and Chester Alday drove up in a pickup truck. Carl Isaacs murdered Aubrey in the same bedroom as Jerry Alday, while Coleman murdered Chester in the bathroom. After Chester's murder, Carl Isaacs raped Mary Alday on the kitchen floor. The group moved Mary Alday to a wooded area, where Dungee raped her and then murdered her by shooting her as well. During his testimony at trial, Billy Isaacs would later testify that his brother and Dungee tortured Mary Alday as well.

During a 1977 interview, Carl Isaacs explained that he and his partners in crime murdered the victims rather than allowing them to live because, although the primary motive was robbery, the escapees did not want to return to prison and felt that they could not leave witnesses: "We figured that they couldn't take us back to prison if [the victims] couldn't talk."

=== Investigation and apprehension ===
The Isaacs brothers, Dungee, and Coleman fled the crime scene in Mary Alday's 1970 Chevrolet Impala, abandoning Richard Miller's stolen Chevelle near where they left Mary Alday's body, and crossed into neighboring Early County.

When Ned, Jimmy, Aubrey, and Chester Alday had not returned to their respective homes, Ned's wife Ernestine called relatives who lived near Jerry's trailer. Chester's wife Barbara went to Jerry's trailer and called for Jerry but did not receive an answer, and she assumed the trailer was unoccupied because there were no cars nearby. At 2:30 AM on May 15, 1973, Barbara, Ned's surviving brother Bud Alday, and Bud's son Roy revisited Jerry's trailer. Roy and Bud gained entry and immediately found one victim's body on a couch. Afterwards, they returned to Bud's house and called a sheriff at 2:45 AM. The sheriff discovered the five male victims' bodies and summoned the Georgia Division of Investigation for assistance. Crime scene investigators determined that the killers used four different guns in the murders. As Mary Alday's body was left in the wooded area where she had been kidnapped and murdered, investigators discovered her body later on May 15, hours after they discovered the men's bodies.

Investigators found a beer can in a sink, which they linked to the murderers as none of the Aldays were known to drink beer. Investigators also found Richard Miller's car, which a short investigation revealed had been stolen in Pennsylvania near where three men, identified as Coleman, Dungee, and the elder of the two Isaacs brothers, had recently escaped from prison. The next morning, police issued an all-points bulletin for Mary Alday's car, naming Carl and Billy Isaacs, Coleman, and Dungee as suspects in its theft.

Coleman, Dungee, and the Isaacs brothers initially fled westward before deciding to travel towards Baltimore to find familiar territory. While in Livingston, Alabama, they abandoned Mary's car on a rural dirt road and stole a 1972 Chevrolet Caprice. The four traveled to an area near the Virginia–West Virginia border and, in need of money, robbed a grocery store near the Slate Creek River of several firearms and $3,000 USD. News of the robbery quickly reached authorities, prompting troopers in West Virginia to set up a roadblock at the nearby Virginia border. Two troopers preparing to set up the roadblock saw the quartet's stolen Caprice and gave chase. The chase ended when the driver went down a dirt road and all four occupants abandoned the Caprice on foot. State troopers who had followed the car fired warning shots, prompting Dungee to surrender, while Coleman and the Isaacs brothers continued running on foot and escaped. After his arrest, investigators found Dungee was carrying a wristwatch belonging to Mary Alday. The three remaining fugitives rested under a cliff, where investigators tracked them with bloodhounds and took them into custody in the Highway Patrol Headquarters at Bluefield, West Virginia, without any further struggle. The men were carrying three weapons that investigators would connect to the Alday murders. By the time Coleman and the Isaacs brothers were taken into custody, Dungee had already given a statement with details about the Alday family members' murders; during his initial questioning while in Bluefield, Coleman confirmed to investigators that he had murdered Richard Miller.

West Virginia officials transported the four by plane to Atlanta on May 19. Authorities housed the four in separate jails until their arraignment the following Monday, May 21. Authorities temporarily transported Coleman to Pennsylvania when he claimed he knew where Richard Miller's body was, but when he was unable to locate Miller's body, he was returned to Georgia. The defendants were housed in the Randolph County jail in Cuthbert, Georgia, until their trials began.

== Legal proceedings and trials ==
=== First trial ===
All four of the defendants were indicted on six counts of murder on September 4, 1973. Investigators characterized Carl Isaacs as the ringleader of the group, since officials considered him the most intelligent and best at organizing out of the four. They characterized Dungee as a follower, which Billy Isaacs corroborated, later testifying during Dungee's trial, "[Dungee] never said much. Whenever [Coleman] or Carl told him to do something, he did it."

The first trials for Carl Isaacs, Coleman, and Dungee took place in January 1974, and lasted for less than one week. The trials were not joint; rather, they were held on back-to-back Mondays. The trial of Carl Isaacs commenced on December 31, 1973, while Dungee's trial started on January 7, 1974, and Coleman faced trial on January 14, 1974. The surviving Aldays expressed their reluctance to release any public statements during the men's trials due to their fear that anything they said might help Carl Isaacs, Coleman, and Dungee with their appeals; they hired a special prosecutor who was a family friend, former lieutenant governor Peter Zack Geer. Isaacs' attorney was Bobby Hill, an anti-death penalty state representative who served in the Georgia House of Representatives' Black Caucus. The defendants did not testify at their first trials. In Geer's closing statement at Isaacs' trial, he asked the jury to "use your Georgia walking-about sense and tell me if Carl Isaacs has an 'abandoned and malignant heart,'" making reference to Georgia law's written definition of murder. The jury deliberated for 38 minutes before finding Isaacs guilty of murder.

Billy Isaacs, who agreed to testify for the state, pleaded guilty to armed robbery and burglary and was sentenced to 40 years in prison. All three of the adult defendants – Carl Isaacs, Dungee, and Coleman – were convicted of six counts of first-degree murder and sentenced to death. Coleman reportedly smiled and said "Thank you" to Superior Court Judge Walter I. Geer upon hearing his death sentence.

=== Death row, appeals, and retrial ===
==== Overturned sentence ====
Shortly before the apprehension and arrest of the four suspects, reporters interviewed Seminole County Sheriff Dan White; when asked what he would do with the Alday family's murderers, he cited the Book of Genesis to justify Carl Isaacs, Wayne Coleman, and George Dungee receiving the death penalty. Sheriff White also stated, "If I had my way about it, I'd have me a large oven, and I'd precook [the suspects] for several days. [...] And I don't think that would satisfy me." A federal appeals court later cited Sheriff White's comments as a contributing factor for ordering new trials for the death-sentenced defendants.

Prior to 1985, lower courts rejected appeals from Isaacs, Coleman, and Dungee due to "the overwhelmingly uncontroverted evidence of their willful participation in what is generally regarded as the most heinous criminal orgy in the history of the state." However, in December 1985, the United States Court of Appeals for the Eleventh Circuit overturned Coleman's conviction and death sentence; Carl Isaacs and Dungee appealed jointly and had their convictions and death sentences overturned the next month, in January 1986. In their decision, the circuit court agreed with lower courts' rulings that there was "overwhelming evidence" of the defendants' guilt, but they agreed with the defendants' contentions in their appeals that there was also "overwhelming evidence that the community had prejudiced both guilt and sentence," referring to both the pretrial publicity in Seminole County as well as comments like those of Sheriff White, and stating that if they failed to overturn the defendants' convictions, "an obviously guilty defendant would have no right to a fair trial."

Some South Georgia residents received news of the appeals negatively; over 100,000 citizens petitioned for the three appellate judges who overturned the defendants' sentences to be impeached, to no avail, as the U.S. Supreme Court upheld the Eleventh Circuit Court's decision. South Georgia residents also cited the appeals and retrials as having a significantly negative economic impact on Seminole County, as the county was required to pay the defendants' legal fees and for some of their other needs, like dentures for Coleman and a suit for Carl Isaacs.

==== Retrials and resentencing ====
Carl Isaacs' retrial took place in Perry, Georgia, in Houston County, in January 1988. Isaacs' retrial gained significant amounts of press and controversy, to the point of local police worrying about the potential threat of Isaacs being subjected to extrajudicial punishment. Isaacs' retrial also featured heightened security. Billy Isaacs once again served as a primary witness, with testimony recounting the murders in detail. Carl Isaacs was again convicted of the six murders and sentenced to death.

Coleman's retrial took place in 1988 in DeKalb County, Georgia, which is located hundreds of miles away from Seminole County. Judge Hugh Lawson was the presiding judge. On May 2, Coleman's jury again convicted him of six counts of murder. When it came to sentencing, jurors later reported that their votes were split on each of the six murder charges. Most favored imposing a death sentence for Ned Alday's murder, while there was an even split in their votes for the murders of Jimmy, Mary, and Aubrey Alday. After over 34 hours of deliberation, Judge Lawson determined that Coleman's jury was hung on all six murder charges' sentences and enforced six consecutive life sentences, as a life sentence was automatic in the event that a jury could not unanimously agree on the death penalty. Coleman would be eligible for parole in 15 years.

Dungee was the last of the three death-sentenced men to receive a retrial, to take place in Columbus, Georgia, but proceedings concluded in mid-July 1988 when Dungee pleaded guilty to all charges against him. Two days prior, prosecutors had announced they were prohibited from seeking another death sentence against Dungee due to his intellectual disabilities, as Georgia had passed a law earlier in 1988 to protect inmates with "significantly sub-average general intellectual functioning" from being sentenced to death. After Dungee pleaded guilty, his trial judge imposed six life sentences, three running consecutively, with the understanding between both Dungee's lawyers and the prosecution being that he would likely never be paroled.

== Aftermath ==
=== Alday family ===
After the murders, a memorial fund was established for the victims, the proceeds of which later went towards funding the building of a new church.

The six Alday family murder victims' funerals took place on May 17, 1973. Afterwards, they were buried in the cemetery of the Spring Creek Baptist Church in Donalsonville, with their resting place marked by a marble tombstone measuring 20 feet long. Their joint funeral service had over 1,000 attendees, including over 50 other Alday family members. On May 18, 1973, four days after the murders and one day after the funerals, Mary Alday's mother Alberta Lane Campbell learned details of how Mary was murdered; Campbell died the next day, with the Early County News attributing Campbell's death to her overwhelming grief. The family's dog died weeks after the family's murders as well.

Ernestine Alday, the mother of three of the victims and wife of one, lost the farm due to a technicality that granted inheritance of the farm to Mary Alday, as Mary was known to have died after Jerry did. After Mary's death, Mary's parents, who lived in Miller County, Georgia, inherited the majority of the farm, while Chester's wife Barbara inherited a small part of the property. An unknown party sold part of the farm to Ernestine Alday so she could establish a home there. Ernestine's family and friends supported her, although she also had to sell the farm equipment the Alday men had used. She died on October 24, 1998, and was buried next to Ned Alday.

In 2003, Ned Alday's granddaughter lobbied for the passage of the "Alday Family Bill," requiring the state of Georgia to send twice-yearly case updates to the surviving families of the victims of death row inmates. The Georgia General Assembly passed the bill. That same year, in May 2003, while standing outside the prison during Carl Isaacs' execution, Ned Alday's granddaughter delivered a statement regarding the surviving Alday family members' displeasure with the way courts handled the family's case. By 2005, she worked with the Georgia Department of Corrections in a program designed to reduce prison recidivism, stating that her family's experience with crime and the legal system inspired her to pursue that line of work.

=== Perpetrators ===
On April 22, 2003, after Carl Isaacs had exhausted his state and federal appeals, the Houston County Superior Court ordered his execution to take place between May 6 and May 13, 2003. Isaacs filed a motion to vacate the execution order, as well as a state habeas petition; all motions to call off the execution were denied. Isaacs was executed by lethal injection on May 6, 2003, at the Georgia Diagnostic and Classification State Prison, and pronounced dead at 8:07 pm EST. Isaacs did not make a final statement or apologize to the Alday family.

Reportedly, Isaacs' execution marked the first occasion since Georgia's post-1976 reinstatement of the death penalty wherein members of a victim's family were allowed to witness an execution in Georgia. Four members of the Alday family were permitted to directly view Isaacs' execution, although a total of approximately 60 Alday family members traveled to the state prison in Jackson to be present on the premises during the execution. Isaacs had been on death row almost 30 years and was the longest-serving death row inmate in the United States at the time of his execution. By the time Carl Isaacs received his 2003 execution date, Ned Alday's wife, two brothers, sister, and fourth son had died, as had the judge who presided over the original 1974 trial of Coleman, Dungee, and Carl Isaacs; Seminole County's sheriff at the time; the first police officer to arrive at the scene of the murders; the original prosecutor; and several of the jurors who passed the initial death sentences.

George Dungee died on April 4, 2006, at the age of 68, while still serving his sentence in Georgia State Prison in Reidsville. Although his body was not autopsied, his official cause of death was determined to be acute congestive heart failure and chronic obstructive pulmonary disease. Dungee had no relatives available to be notified of his death or to claim his body, so he was buried in the prison cemetery, with corrections officials serving as his pallbearers.

Billy Isaacs was released from prison in 1993. Afterwards, he relocated to Florida, where he died on May 4, 2009, aged 51.

As of January 2026, Wayne Coleman remains incarcerated in the Wilcox State Prison; he has repeatedly and unsuccessfully attempted to be released on parole.

== In popular culture and media ==
In the 1970s, while conducting research on different figures involved in the murders, Fleming "Tex" Fuller, a documentary filmmaker, conducted an interview with Carl Isaacs, who had already been convicted and was imprisoned on death row. Isaacs made several incriminating statements on film, including that he would have murdered the Alday family again if given the chance, that "[t]he only thing the Aldays ever did that stood out was getting killed by me," and that he indeed raped Mary Alday and shot Jerry, Ned, and Aubrey Alday. In 1977, Fuller released a documentary made for television called Murder One, which featured interviews with six men who had faced the prospect of capital punishment at the time or prior to the film's release, including Carl Isaacs.

In September 1988, the independent film Murder One was released in Canada and the United States. The film was a biographical crime drama based on the Alday family murders, directed by Graeme Campbell and starring Henry Thomas as Billy Isaacs, who narrated the film's events; James Wilder as Carl Isaacs; Stephen Shellen as Wayne Coleman; and Erroll Slue as George Dungee. The screenplay was written by Tex Fuller, who based his writing off of his 1977 documentary. The New York Times gave the film a positive review for its avoidance of sensationalist reenactments and depictions of the murders. The film generated controversy for containing several factual errors – one being that Billy Isaacs received a sentence of 100 years' imprisonment, when his sentence was actually 40 years – and for painting the perpetrators, especially Billy Isaacs, in a sympathetic light. One review printed in the Orlando Sentinel recommended In Cold Blood as a superior crime film and suggested Murder One is akin to a "cheap exploitation flick". Theaters in and near southwest Georgia did not show Murder One, both because representatives from the film's distributor, Miramax, felt the film's subject would be "too close to home" for the locals, and because Miramax was afraid the film would offend moviegoers.

In 2015, Investigation Discovery collaborated with WALB to work on a documentary about the murders, which aired on July 14 of the same year.

In 1983, South Georgia-based reporter Charles Postell, who spent ten years corresponding with Carl Isaacs while Isaacs was on death row, published the book Dead Man Coming about the murders. Postell and his wife would later be accused of helping Carl Isaacs orchestrate an escape from death row, but the charges were ultimately dropped. That same year, Clark Howard published the book Brothers in Blood about the murders, and in 2011, author Thomas Cook published another book about the Alday family murders, titled Blood Echoes.

== See also ==
- List of longest prison sentences served
- List of people executed in Georgia (U.S. state)
- List of people executed in the United States in 2003
