= Nicholas Ingram =

British-American murderer (1963–1995)

- Born: 20 November 1963; Cambridge, England
- Died: 7 April 1995 (aged 31); Georgia Diagnostic and Classification State Prison, Jackson, Georgia, U.S.
- Cause of death: Execution by electrocution
- Citizenship: Dual British/American
- Conviction: Malice murder
- Penalty: Death

Nicholas Lee Ingram (20 November 1963 – 7 April 1995) was a dual British and American national, executed for murder in 1995 at the age of 31 by the US state of Georgia, using the electric chair. He was born in Britain, but had an American father. The British Prime Minister, John Major, declined to intervene and attempt to get him reprieved. He had been imprisoned since 1983 for the murder of J.C. Sawyer, a 55-year-old retired military veteran, and injuring his wife Mary Eunice Sawyer, during a robbery. The Archbishop of Canterbury, George Carey, was one of many who campaigned unsuccessfully for clemency. The case received widespread media coverage in the United Kingdom.

== Early life ==
Ingram was born in Addenbrookes Hospital in Cambridge, England, to a British mother, Ann, and an American father, Johnny Ingram. One year after Ingram's birth, his family relocated to the U.S. state of Georgia.

In October and November 1982, Ingram was charged with two counts of burglary, and he pleaded guilty. In February 1983, he received a five-year "probated" sentence requiring him to serve one year in prison and four years of probation. He served this time at the Arrendale State Prison (then known as the Alto State Prison) before he was paroled on 7 May 1983, less than a month before the murder.

== Murder of J.C. Sawyer ==
On 3 June 1983, 19-year-old Ingram sold car wheels and a ring at a pawn shop while accompanied by a friend. Afterwards, he and his friend retrieved a .38 caliber revolver from his father's house; Ingram told his friend he knew where he could get a vehicle that he would then use to go to California. At approximately 6:30 pm EST, Ingram's friend drove him to a house in Marietta, Georgia, in Cobb County. Ingram told his friend to wait in the car; before leaving, Ingram stated that he intended to pistol-whip the people in the house, although he was not sure he would be able to kill them. His friend decided not to wait for Ingram and drove home instead.

At approximately 6:30 pm, Ingram burglarized the Cobb County home of 55-year-old retired military veteran J.C. and his 48-year-old wife, Mary Eunice Sawyer. Ingram asked that they let him use their phone, and they refused entry, after which Ingram produced a pistol, threatened to shoot them if they did not cooperate with him, and demanded money and the keys to the couple's car. Mary Sawyer gave Ingram $60 USD, while J.C. Sawyer surrendered the keys to his pickup truck. Ingram then led the couple outside and into the woods surrounding their home. Once they were about 200 yd (180 m) from the home, Ingram tied their hands behind them and bound them to a tree using rope and wire. The Sawyers begged Ingram not to kill them while Ingram taunted and threatened them; he ultimately gagged them with his shirt after tearing it in two and stuffing each half into each victim's mouth. He then shot them both in the head at point-blank range. The shots were fatal to J.C. Sawyer, but Mrs. Sawyer survived. She played dead until she heard Ingram drive off with J.C. Sawyer's truck. After confirming that her husband was dead, Mary Sawyer untied herself and went to a neighbor's house to call the police.

=== Apprehension ===
After the murder, Cobb County police put out a nationwide bulletin warning about Ingram's suspected actions and calling for his arrest. Witnesses observed Ingram at a convenience store later that night, driving a pickup truck matching the description of J.C. Sawyer's pickup truck. Three days later, authorities recovered the pickup truck on the side of Interstate 20 in Mississippi; it had run out of gas. Authorities also found a receipt from a motel in Lincoln, Alabama, dated 3 June 1983. Investigators retrieved the motel's portion of the receipt, which had Ingram's handwriting on it, therefore connecting him to the theft of the pickup truck.

Ingram somehow made his way to California, where he stole another car. Afterwards, he fled to Nebraska, where, on 27 June 1983, he was arrested for motor vehicle theft and driving under the influence after Nebraska officers recognized Ingram from the nationwide bulletin. Police questioned him about one of the stolen automobiles. Ingram then told police that he was wanted for two murders in Georgia. Nebraska authorities contacted Georgia authorities afterwards and extradited Ingram to Georgia for questioning there. Ingram then gave a partial confession to the murders, stating that he remembered his friend driving him to the Sawyers' residence, finding his friend gone, and taking a pickup truck, but that he woke up the next morning in a parking lot in Alabama; he insisted that he had blacked out from drinking too much and that he could not remember a robbery or murder.

== Murder conviction ==
=== Trial ===
In late October 1983, Cobb County District Attorney Michael Charron indicated the county's intent to seek the death penalty against Ingram. Ingram's defence attorney argued that the death penalty was inherently unconstitutional and thus should not apply in Ingram's case. Ingram's defence attorney's contention stemmed from the grand jury selection process Cobb County utilized; Ingram's attorney argued the selection process was discriminatory in excluding female and Black members and was not fully representative of the Marietta population. Ingram's defence attorney also argued that Georgia's state law forbade grand juries from including attorneys and government officials despite Ingram's grand jury containing an attorney and a member of Marietta's Downtown Development Authority. Charron countered by showing a history of Georgia case law establishing the death penalty's constitutionality. The judge in Ingram's case sided with Charron, permitting the state to pursue a death sentence against Ingram.

Jury selection began in November 1983. Ingram's primary defence at trial, as stated in his attorney's opening statement, was that Mary Sawyer's description of the murderer and assailant did not match Ingram, and the Georgia Bureau of Investigation's crime lab also allegedly made a mistake when testing J.C. Sawyer's blood; he also alleged that the GBI would be unable to produce forensic evidence tying Ingram to the crime, including fingerprints, blood, fiber, or hairs. Despite these claims, Ingram's defence attorney did not call any witnesses to testify on Ingram's behalf.

The prosecution called over 30 witnesses, the last of whom was Mary Sawyer, who recounted her and her husband's interactions with Ingram. She testified that Ingram commented while pistol-whipping J.C. Sawyer that "he liked to torture the [male victims] while the [female victims] watched." She testified that Ingram also told her and J.C. Sawyer that it would take days for anyone to find their bodies after he murdered them, and he threatened the Sawyers' surviving relatives if they ever gave evidence against Ingram: "It will take two or three days for your bodies to be found, and when your bodies are found, if any of your family finds any evidence to convict me, the most I'll ever get is 30 years. And I'll come back and get them." Under cross-examination, Ingram's defence attorney questioned Mary Sawyer about the initial description of Ingram that she provided to police, to which she responded, "If you could have photographed my mind, you would have gotten the perfect picture of him, because I have thought about him night and day. [...] I will never forget the person's face who shot my husband and who shot me." After Mary Sawyer's testimony, the jury retired to deliberate. After three hours of deliberation, the jury returned with a verdict on 20 November 1983, Sawyer's 20th birthday; he was convicted of murder and two counts of armed robbery. However, the jury could not yet agree on a sentence and returned to deliberate further. After five more hours of deliberation, the jury sentenced Ingram to death on 21 November 1983, and the judge set 10 January 1984 as his date of execution. Ingram reportedly laughed as the judge set his execution date, although his attorney claimed his laughter was due to Ingram not knowing "how to react" to hearing the sentence. Georgia's automatic appeals process postponed Ingram's execution from taking place in January 1984.

=== Controversy ===
In seeking to halt the execution, Ingram's lawyers argued that they had only recently learned that their client had been heavily drugged and medicated by prison officials before his 1983 trial and therefore was not aware enough of the proceedings to show a contrition that might have influenced jurors not to recommend the death penalty. Ingram's appeal lawyers argued that he was given an antipsychotic drug during his trial that made him appear to be unemotional and remorseless. They also argued that his lawyer in that trial was not told of a diagnosis that Ingram had psychiatric problems, a diagnosis that might have altered the trying of the case. The Georgia Attorney General, Mike Bowers, countered that those issues had been addressed in previous appeals. The courts agreed. District Judge Horace Ward dismissed pleas by Ingram's lawyers for a new hearing to examine alleged new evidence that he was drugged at his trial in 1983 and unable to brief his defence lawyers.

=== Attempts to seeking clemency ===
Ingram's case had been taken up by the British media, prompting a flood of pleas for clemency – including one from the Archbishop of Canterbury – to Georgia's governor at the time, Zell Miller. Ingram's mother, Ann, and other relatives solicited and received statements appealing for clemency from 53 members of Parliament, the Archbishop of Canterbury, the president of the European Parliament and a number of human-rights groups. Mrs Ingram appealed for the intervention of Prime Minister John Major in a letter she delivered to him while he was visiting Washington. In a handwritten response, the Prime Minister replied: "I found your letter very moving and I can imagine the profound distress you must be feeling. But I have concluded, with deepest regret, that there are no proper grounds for the British Government to intervene with the State of Georgia."

== Execution ==
The day before Ingram's execution, his surviving victim, Mary Sawyer, was interviewed by WSB-TV. She voiced her support for Ingram's execution, stating, "[J.C. Sawyer and I] begged for mercy and were given none. He was the judge, jury and executioner – all in a manner of minutes. He certainly did not intend for me to live."

In an "open letter to the British people" published in London newspapers, Ingram thanked those who had appealed on his behalf, adding: "If I die, I hope it is not for nothing. I hope people will see that a ritualistic killing in the electric chair solves nothing." Ingram declined a final meal, but later ate some crackers and chips bought by relatives from a prison vending machine.

According to Steve Boggan, Ann and Johnny Ingram last saw their son eight hours before his execution. Ingram's head was already shaved and he had worn a baseball cap to spare his parents the traumatic sight of his shaved head. Shortly after Ingram's execution, his father stated, "Well, he's dead now and they can't hurt him no more" [sic], while his mother said, "There's nothing to be said. It has happened and nothing's going to bring him back. Now we must pick up the pieces of our lives."

Ingram's execution took place at the Georgia Diagnostic and Classification State Prison in Jackson, Georgia. Two chaplains and officials from Georgia's prison service were with him in the execution chamber when he died as well as six media representatives who went into the prison to view the execution. Ingram's lawyer, Clive Stafford Smith, also witnessed his execution. Witnesses said Ingram glared at them while guards strapped him into the electric chair. When the warden, Albert "Gerry" Thomas, asked Ingram if he had any last words, Ingram spat at him. When he was asked whether he wished to have a final prayer, some sources suggested Ingram replied, "Let's get on with it". Other sources stated Ingram simply closed his eyes and did not mention Ingram speaking. Ingram was pronounced dead at 9:15 p.m. according to Vicki Gavalas, the prison department spokeswoman for the Georgia Diagnostic and Classification Center where the execution took place. He died in Georgia's electric chair, Old Sparky.

== See also ==
General:

- Tracy Housel - another British-American who was also executed by the state of Georgia

Execution:

- Capital punishment in Georgia (U.S. state)
- Capital punishment in the United States
- List of people executed in Georgia (U.S. state)
- List of people executed in the United States in 1995
