= List of people executed in the United States in 2016 =

Twenty people, all male, were executed in the United States in 2016, all by lethal injection. The state of Georgia executed nine people, setting a record for the most executions conducted there in a calendar year.

== List of people executed in the United States in 2016 ==
No.	Date of execution	Name	Age of person			Gender	Ethnicity	State	Method	Ref.
No.	Date of execution	Name	At execution	At offense	Age difference	Gender	Ethnicity	State	Method	Ref.
1	January 7, 2016	Oscar Ray Bolin Jr.	53	24	29	Male	White	Florida	Lethal injection	
2	January 20, 2016	Richard Allen Masterson	43	28	15	Male	White	Texas	Lethal injection	
3	January 21, 2016	Christopher Eugene Brooks	43	20	23	Male	White	Alabama	Lethal injection	
4	January 27, 2016	James Garrett Freeman	35	26	9	Male	White	Texas	Lethal injection	
5	February 3, 2016	Brandon Astor Jones	72	36	36	Male	Black	Georgia	Lethal injection	
6	February 16, 2016	Gustavo Julian Garcia	43	18	25	Male	Hispanic	Texas	Lethal injection	
7	February 17, 2016	Travis Clinton Hittson	45	21	24	Male	White	Georgia	Lethal injection	
8	March 9, 2016	Coy Wayne Wesbrook	58	39	19	Male	White	Texas	Lethal injection	
9	March 22, 2016	Adam Kelly Ward	33	22	11	Male	White	Texas	Lethal injection	
10	March 31, 2016	Joshua Daniel Bishop	41	19	22	Male	White	Georgia	Lethal injection	
11	April 6, 2016	Pablo Lucio Vasquez	38	20	18	Male	Hispanic	Texas	Lethal injection	
12	April 12, 2016	Kenneth Earl Fults	47	27	20	Male	Black	Georgia	Lethal injection	
13	April 27, 2016	Daniel Anthony Lucas	37	19	18	Male	White	Georgia	Lethal injection	
14	May 11, 2016	Earl Mitchell Forrest II	66	53	13	Male	White	Missouri	Lethal injection	
15	July 15, 2016	John Wayne Conner	60	25	35	Male	White	Georgia	Lethal injection	
16	October 5, 2016	Barney Ronald Fuller Jr.	58	44	14	Male	White	Texas	Lethal injection	
17	October 19, 2016	Gregory Paul Lawler	63	44	19	Male	White	Georgia	Lethal injection	
18	November 16, 2016	Steven Frederick Spears	54	39	15	Male	White	Georgia	Lethal injection	
19	December 6, 2016	William Cary Sallie	50	24	26	Male	White	Georgia	Lethal injection	
20	December 8, 2016	Ronald Bert Smith Jr.	45	23	22	Male	White	Alabama	Lethal injection	
		Average:	49 years	29 years	20 years					

== Demographics ==
Gender
Male	20	100%
Female	0	0%
Ethnicity
White	16	80%
Black	2	10%
Hispanic	2	10%
State
Georgia	9	45%
Texas	7	35%
Alabama	2	10%
Florida	1	5%
Missouri	1	5%
Method
Lethal injection	20	100%
Month
January	4	20%
February	3	15%
March	3	15%
April	3	15%
May	1	5%
June	0	0%
July	1	5%
August	0	0%
September	0	0%
October	2	10%
November	1	5%
December	2	10%
Age
30–39	4	20%
40–49	7	35%
50–59	5	25%
60–69	3	15%
70–79	1	5%
Total	20	100%

== Executions in recent years ==
Number of executions
2017	23
2016	20
2015	28
Total	71

== Record number of executions in Georgia ==
In 2016, the State of Georgia executed nine people. This set a record for the most executions conducted in Georgia in a calendar year. Prior to this, the most executions conducted in the state were five executions. This happened in 1987 and again in 2015.

== Last meals ==
- Henry Hargreaves, a Brooklyn-based photographer, recreated (and then photographed) the last meals served to all twenty men executed in 2016. Through his series, entitled A Year of Killing, Hargreaves sought to educate people about the use of the death penalty. This work is a sequel to his 2011 series No Seconds, which recreated the last meals ordered by famous criminals like Ted Bundy.
- In 2016, the most-ordered food was steak, followed by pizza, although some of the condemned prisoners elected to forgo a special last meal.

== See also ==
- List of death row inmates in the United States
- List of juveniles executed in the United States since 1976
- List of most recent executions by jurisdiction
- List of people executed in Georgia (U.S. state)
- List of women executed in the United States since 1976

Preceded by 2015	List of people executed in the United States in 2016	Succeeded by 2017
