= Gustavo Julian Garcia =

American murderer (1972–2016)

- Born: September 27, 1972; McKinney, Texas, U.S.
- Died: February 16, 2016 (aged 43); Huntsville Unit, Texas, U.S.
- Status: Executed by lethal injection
- Conviction: Capital murder
- Penalty: Death (December 19, 1990)

Details
- Victims: Craig Alfonso Turski, 43; Gregory Jorge Martin, 18
- Date: December 9, 1990; January 5, 1991
- Country: United States
- State: Texas

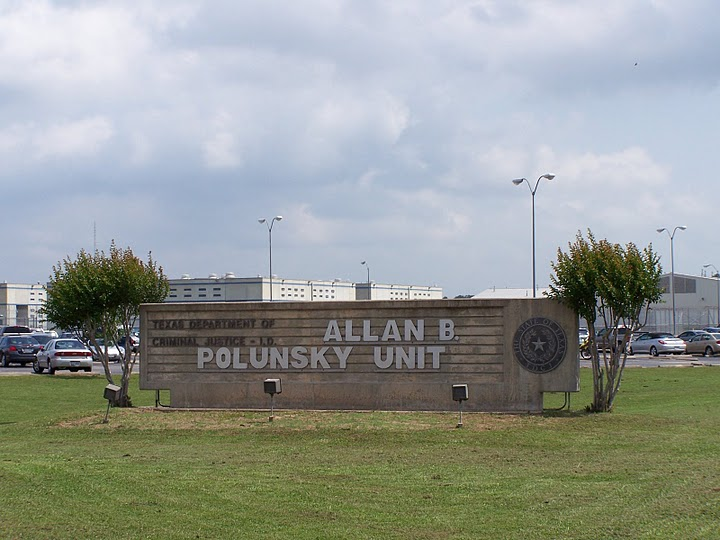
Allan B. Polunsky Unit houses the State of Texas death row for men.

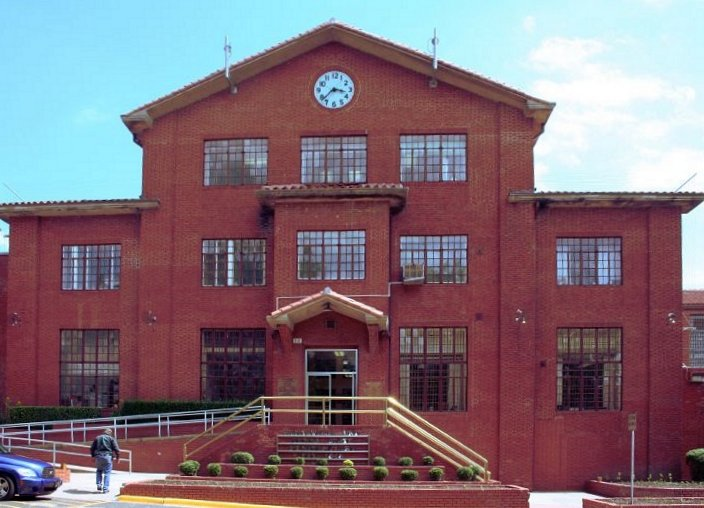
Huntsville Unit, The state of Texas has its execution chamber in the Huntsville unit.

Gustavo Julian Garcia (September 27, 1972 – February 16, 2016) Also known as "El Cubano," was an American criminal and prisoner from McKinney, Texas, who was executed for the 1990 murder of Craig Alfonso Turski.

== Profile ==
Craig Alfonso Turski, 43, was murdered on December 9, 1990, during the robbery of the Warehouse Beverage Store in Plano, Texas. Garcia, then 18, entered the store and demanded cash as he displayed a sawed-off shotgun. As the victim attempted to escape, Garcia shot Turski in the abdomen, reloaded, and then fatally shot him in the back of the head.

Garcia also participated in a robbery of a Texaco station on January 5, 1991, where he was arrested. Gregory Jorge Martin, an 18-year-old clerk, was killed during the course of that robbery. His co-defendant was 16-year-old Christopher Vargas, who received a life sentence for capital murder charges. Shelia Maria Garcia, the common-law wife of Gustavo Julian Garcia, was also arrested and received a 20-year sentence on conspiracy to commit robbery. Shelia Garcia was paroled in January 1999.

== Incarceration ==
Garcia arrived on death row on January 8, 1992. He was initially located in the Ellis Unit, but was transferred to the Allan B. Polunsky Unit (formerly the Terrell Unit) in 1999.

Garcia attempted to escape the Ellis Unit death row on Thanksgiving Day 1998, along with six other prisoners, but was arrested after surrendering. Martin Gurule was able to escape but was shot and subsequently drowned.

Garcia received a new sentencing hearing in 2001 after then-Attorney General of Texas John Cornyn learned that Walter Quijano, a psychologist who testified in the trial, had stated at the original trial that black and Hispanic men were more dangerous to society since there were more of them in prison. However, Garcia was again sentenced to death. He resided on Texas's death row for over 25 years before he was executed on February 16, 2016.

== See also ==
- Capital punishment in Texas
- List of people executed in Texas, 2010–2019
- List of people executed in the United States in 2016

Executions carried out in Texas
Preceded by James Garrett Freeman; January 27, 2016	Gustavo Julian Garcia; February 16, 2016	Succeeded by Coy Wayne Wesbrook; March 9, 2016
Executions carried out in the United States
Preceded by Brandon Astor Jones – Georgia; February 3, 2016	Gustavo Julian Garcia – Texas; February 16, 2016	Succeeded by Travis Clinton Hittson – Georgia; February 17, 2016
