= List of people executed in Georgia (U.S. state) =

This is a list of people executed in Georgia. Since 1976, a total of 77 people have been executed by the state of Georgia in the United States. Buddy Justus received a death sentence in Georgia, but was executed in Virginia.

== List of people executed in Georgia since 1976 ==
No.	Name	Race	Age	Sex	Date of execution	County	Method	Victim(s)	Governor
1	John Eldon Smith	White	53	M	December 15, 1983	Bibb	Electrocution	Ronald Akins and Juanita Akins	Joe Frank Harris
2	Ivon Ray Stanley	Black	28	M	July 12, 1984	Decatur	Electrocution	Clifford Floyd	Joe Frank Harris
3	Alpha Otis O'Daniel Stephens	Black	39	M	December 12, 1984	Bleckley	Electrocution	Roy Asbell	Joe Frank Harris
4	Roosevelt Green Jr.	Black	28	M	January 9, 1985	Monroe	Electrocution	Teresa Carol Allen	Joe Frank Harris
5	Van Roosevelt Solomon	Black	41	M	February 20, 1985	Cobb	Electrocution	Roger Dennis Tackett	Joe Frank Harris
6	John C. Young	Black	28	M	March 20, 1985	Bibb	Electrocution	Coleman Brice, Gladys Brice, and Katie Davis	Joe Frank Harris
7	Jerome Bowden	Black	34	M	June 24, 1986	Muscogee	Electrocution	Kathryn Stryker	Joe Frank Harris
8	Joseph Holcombe Mulligan	Black	35	M	May 15, 1987	Muscogee	Electrocution	Marion Jones Miller	Joe Frank Harris
9	Richard Tucker Jr.	Black	44	M	May 22, 1987	Bibb	Electrocution	Edna Sandefur	Joe Frank Harris
10	William Boyd Tucker	White	31	M	May 29, 1987	Muscogee	Electrocution	Kathleen Parry	Joe Frank Harris
11	William "Billy" Mitchell	Black	35	M	September 2, 1987	Worth	Electrocution	Christopher Carr	Joe Frank Harris
12	Timothy Wesley McCorquodale	White	35	M	September 21, 1987	Fulton	Electrocution	Donna Marie Dixon	Joe Frank Harris
13	James Norbon Messer Jr.	White	34	M	July 28, 1988	Polk	Electrocution	Rhonda Tanner	Joe Frank Harris
14	Henry Willis III	Black	36	M	May 18, 1989	Berrien	Electrocution	Police chief of Ray City James Edward Giddens	Joe Frank Harris
15	Warren McCleskey	Black	44	M	September 25, 1991	Fulton	Electrocution	Atlanta Police Officer Frank Schlatt	Zell Miller
16	Thomas Dean Stevens	White	36	M	June 28, 1993	Wayne	Electrocution	Roger Honeycutt	Zell Miller
17	Christopher Allen Burger	White	33	M	December 7, 1993	Wayne	Electrocution	Roger Honeycutt	Zell Miller
18	William Henry Hance	Black	42	M	March 31, 1994	Muscogee	Electrocution	Gail Jackson, a/k/a Gail Faison and Irene Thirkield	Zell Miller
19	Nicholas Lee Ingram	White	31	M	April 7, 1995	Cobb	Electrocution	J. C. Sawyer	Zell Miller
20	Darrell Gene Devier	White	39	M	May 17, 1995	Floyd	Electrocution	Mary Frances Stoner	Zell Miller
21	Larry Grant Lonchar	White	45	M	November 14, 1996	DeKalb	Electrocution	Charles Smith, Steven Smith and Margaret Sweat	Zell Miller
22	Ellis Wayne Felker	White	48	M	November 15, 1996	Houston	Electrocution	Evelyn Joy Ludlam	Zell Miller
23	David Loomus Cargill	White	39	M	June 10, 1998	Muscogee	Electrocution	Cheryl Williams and Danny Williams	Zell Miller
24	Terry Michael Mincey	White	40	M	October 25, 2001	Bibb	Lethal injection	Paulette Riggs	Roy Barnes
25	Jose Martinez High	Black	45	M	November 6, 2001	Taliaferro	Lethal injection	Bonnie Bulloch	Roy Barnes
26	Fred Marion Gilreath Jr.	White	63	M	November 15, 2001	Cobb	Lethal injection	Linda Gilreath and Gerrit Van Leeuwen	Roy Barnes
27	Byron Ashley Parker	White	41	M	December 11, 2001	Douglas	Lethal injection	Christy Ann Griffith	Roy Barnes
28	Ronald Keith Spivey	White	62	M	January 24, 2002	Muscogee	Lethal injection	Charles McCook and Bill Watson	Roy Barnes
29	Tracy Lee Housel	White	43	M	March 12, 2002	Gwinnett	Lethal injection	Carolyn Jean Dellinger Drew	Roy Barnes
30	Wallace Marvin Fugate III	White	52	M	August 16, 2002	Putnam	Lethal injection	Pattie Dianne Fugate	Roy Barnes
31	William Howard Putman	White	59	M	November 13, 2002	Cook	Lethal injection	David Hardin, Katie Back, and William Gerald Hodges	Roy Barnes
32	Larry Eugene Moon	White	57	M	March 25, 2003	Catoosa	Lethal injection	Ricky Callahan	Sonny Perdue
33	Carl Junior Isaacs	White	49	M	May 6, 2003	Seminole	Lethal injection	6 murder victims (Note: The 6 victims were: Jerry Alday, Ned Alday, Jimmy Alday, Mary Alday, Chester Alday, and Aubrey Alday.)	Sonny Perdue
34	James Willie Brown	White	55	M	November 4, 2003	Gwinnett	Lethal injection	Brenda Sue Watson	Sonny Perdue
35	Robert Karl Hicks	White	47	M	July 1, 2004	Spalding	Lethal injection	Toni Strickland Rivers	Sonny Perdue
36	Eddie Albert Crawford	White	47	M	July 19, 2004	Spalding	Lethal injection	Leslie Michelle English	Sonny Perdue
37	Timothy Don Carr	White	34	M	January 25, 2005	Monroe	Lethal injection	Keith Patrick Young	Sonny Perdue
38	Stephen Anthony Mobley	White	39	M	March 1, 2005	Hall	Lethal injection	John C. Collins	Sonny Perdue
39	Robert Dale Conklin	White	44	M	July 12, 2005	Fulton	Lethal injection	George Grant Crooks	Sonny Perdue
40	John Washington Hightower	Black	63	M	June 26, 2007	Morgan	Lethal injection	Dorothy Hightower, Evelyn Reaves, and Sandra Reaves	Sonny Perdue
41	William Earl Lynd	White	53	M	May 6, 2008	Berrien	Lethal injection	Ginger Moore	Sonny Perdue
42	Curtis Osborne	Black	38	M	June 4, 2008	Spalding	Lethal injection	Arthur Jones and Linda Lisa Seaborne	Sonny Perdue
43	Jack Edward Alderman	White	57	M	September 16, 2008	Chatham	Lethal injection	Barbara Jean Alderman	Sonny Perdue
44	Robert L. Newland	White	65	M	March 10, 2009	Glynn	Lethal injection	Carol Sanders Beatty	Sonny Perdue
45	William Mark Mize	White	52	M	April 29, 2009	Oconee	Lethal injection	Eddie Tucker	Sonny Perdue
46	Mark Howard McClain	White	42	M	October 20, 2009	Richmond	Lethal injection	Kevin Brown	Sonny Perdue
47	Melbert Ray Ford Jr.	White	49	M	June 9, 2010	Newton	Lethal injection	Martha Chapman Matich and Lisa Chapman	Sonny Perdue
48	Brandon Joseph Rhode	White	31	M	September 27, 2010	Jones	Lethal injection	Steven Moss, Bryan Moss, and Kristin Moss	Sonny Perdue
49	Emmanuel Fitzgerald Hammond	Black	45	M	January 25, 2011	Fulton	Lethal injection	Julie Love	Nathan Deal
50	Roy Willard Blankenship	White	55	M	June 23, 2011	Chatham	Lethal injection	Sarah Mims Bowen	Nathan Deal
51	Andrew Grant DeYoung	White	37	M	July 21, 2011	Cobb	Lethal injection	Gary DeYoung, Kathy DeYoung, and Sarah DeYoung	Nathan Deal
52	Troy Anthony Davis	Black	42	M	September 21, 2011	Chatham	Lethal injection	Savannah police officer Mark MacPhail	Nathan Deal
53	Andrew Allen Cook	White	38	M	February 21, 2013	Monroe	Lethal injection	Michele Cartagena and Grant Hendrickson	Nathan Deal
54	Marcus Alfonso Wellons	Black	58	M	June 17, 2014	Cobb	Lethal injection	India Roberts	Nathan Deal
55	Robert Wayne Holsey	Black	49	M	December 9, 2014	Baldwin	Lethal injection	Baldwin County Sheriff's Deputy Will Robinson	Nathan Deal
56	Andrew Howard Brannan	White	66	M	January 13, 2015	Laurens	Lethal injection	Laurens County Sheriff's Deputy Kyle Dinkheller	Nathan Deal
57	Warren Lee Hill Jr.	Black	54	M	January 27, 2015	Lee	Lethal injection	Joseph Handspike	Nathan Deal
58	Kelly Renee Gissendaner	White	47	F	September 30, 2015	Gwinnett	Lethal injection	Douglas Gissendaner	Nathan Deal
59	Marcus Ray Johnson	White	50	M	November 19, 2015	Dougherty	Lethal injection	Angela Sizemore	Nathan Deal
60	Brian Keith Terrell	Black	47	M	December 9, 2015	Newton	Lethal injection	John Watson	Nathan Deal
61	Brandon Astor Jones	Black	72	M	February 3, 2016	Cobb	Lethal injection	Roger Dennis Tackett	Nathan Deal
62	Travis Clinton Hittson	White	45	M	February 17, 2016	Houston	Lethal injection	Navy Officer Conway Utterbeck	Nathan Deal
63	Joshua Daniel Bishop	White	41	M	March 31, 2016	Baldwin	Lethal injection	Leverett Lewis Morrison	Nathan Deal
64	Kenneth Earl Fults	Black	47	M	April 12, 2016	Spalding	Lethal injection	Cathy Bounds	Nathan Deal
65	Daniel Anthony Lucas	White	37	M	April 27, 2016	Jones	Lethal injection	Steven Moss, Bryan Moss, and Kristin Moss	Nathan Deal
66	John Wayne Conner	White	60	M	July 15, 2016	Dodge	Lethal injection	J. T. White	Nathan Deal
67	Gregory Paul Lawler	White	63	M	October 19, 2016	Fulton	Lethal injection	Atlanta Police Officer John Richard Sowa	Nathan Deal
68	Steven Frederick Spears	White	54	M	November 16, 2016	Lumpkin	Lethal injection	Sherri Holland	Nathan Deal
69	William Cary Sallie	White	50	M	December 6, 2016	Bacon	Lethal injection	John Lee Moore	Nathan Deal
70	John "J.W." Ledford Jr.	White	46	M	May 17, 2017	Murray	Lethal injection	Harry Buchanan Johnston	Nathan Deal
71	Carlton Michael Gary	Black	67	M	March 15, 2018	Muscogee	Lethal injection	7 murder victims (Note: The 7 victims were: Ferne Jackson, Jean Dimenstein, Florence Scheible, Martha Thurmond, Kathleen Woodruff, Mildred Borom, and Janet Cofer.)	Nathan Deal
72	Robert Earl Butts Jr.	Black	40	M	May 4, 2018	Baldwin	Lethal injection	Corrections Officer Donovan Corey Parks	Nathan Deal
73	Scotty Garnell Morrow	Black	52	M	May 2, 2019	Hall	Lethal injection	Barbara Ann Young and Tonya Woods	Brian Kemp
74	Marion Wilson Jr.	Black	42	M	June 20, 2019	Baldwin	Lethal injection	Corrections Officer Donovan Corey Parks	Brian Kemp
75	Ray Jefferson Cromartie	Black	52	M	November 13, 2019	Thomas	Lethal injection	Richard Slysz	Brian Kemp
76	Donnie Cleveland Lance	White	66	M	January 29, 2020	Jackson	Lethal injection	Sabrina Lance and Dwight Wood Jr.	Brian Kemp
77	Willie James Pye	Black	59	M	March 20, 2024	Spalding	Lethal injection	Alicia Lynn Yarbrough	Brian Kemp

== Demographics ==
Race
White	48	62%
Black	29	38%
Age
20–29	3	4%
30–39	20	26%
40–49	26	34%
50–59	18	23%
60–69	9	12%
70–79	1	1%
Sex
Male	76	99%
Female	1	1%
Date of execution
1976–1979	0	0%
1980–1989	14	18%
1990–1999	9	12%
2000–2009	23	30%
2010–2019	29	38%
2020–2029	2	3%
Method
Lethal injection	54	70%
Electrocution	23	30%
Governor (Party)
George Busbee (D)	0	0%
Joe Frank Harris (D)	14	18%
Zell Miller (D)	9	12%
Roy Barnes (D)	8	10%
Sonny Perdue (R)	17	22%
Nathan Deal (R)	24	31%
Brian Kemp (R)	5	6%
Total	77	100%

== Record number of executions ==
In 2016, the State of Georgia executed nine people. This set a record for the most executions conducted in Georgia in a calendar year. The same year, Texas only executed seven people, the first time it did not lead the nation in executions since 2001 (when it ranked behind Oklahoma). Prior to this, the most executions conducted in the state were five executions. This happened in 1987 and again in 2015.

== Prior to 1976 ==
- Lena Baker was an African American maid who was executed on March 5, 1945, for killing her employer. In 2005, the Georgia State Board of Pardons and Paroles granted a pardon saying a verdict of manslaughter would have been more appropriate.
- The first individual electrocuted for a crime and sentenced to death (in Georgia) was Howard Henson, a black male, for rape and robbery; by electrocution on September 13, 1924, in DeKalb County. (See http://genealogytrails.com/geo/executions3.html through http://genealogytrails.com/geo/executions5.html.)

== See also ==
- Capital punishment in Georgia (U.S. state)
- Capital punishment in the United States
- Furman v. Georgia, the 1972 United States Supreme Court case that led to a de facto moratorium on capital punishment throughout the United States; the moratorium came to an end when Gregg v. Georgia was decided in 1976
- Gregg v. Georgia, the 1976 United States Supreme Court decision ending the de facto moratorium on the death penalty imposed by the Court in its 1972 decision Furman v. Georgia
- List of death row inmates in the United States § Georgia
- List of most recent executions by jurisdiction
- List of people executed in the United States in 2015
- List of people executed in the United States in 2016
- List of women executed in the United States since 1976
