= Murder One (film) =

- Directed by: Graeme Campbell
- Written by: Fleming B. Fuller
- Produced by: Nicolas Stiliadis
- Starring: Henry Thomas; James Wilder
- Cinematography: Ludek Bogner
- Edited by: Michael McMahon
- Music by: Mychael Danna
- Production companies: M-One; SC Entertainment
- Distributed by: Creswin Distribution (Canada); Miramax Films (United States)
- Release dates: May 1988 (Canada); September 9, 1988 (United States)
- Countries: Canada; United States
- Language: English

Murder One is a 1988 independent biographical crime drama film starring Henry Thomas and James Wilder, based on the 1973 Alday family murders.

== Plot ==
In 1973, two half-brothers (Carl and Wayne) and another man (George) escape from a prison in Maryland, picking up their teenage brother Billy and heading south on a murderous spree. Carl is seemingly the most intelligent of the group and assumes the responsibility of leader, while his older half-brother Wayne is a mindless killer, his only interest being to murder any potential witnesses with little care or thought.

When the car they are in breaks down, the group steal another by killing the owner, to show Billy how he should take part in their spree. They have no plan where they are going and show little care or interest. While looking for gas money, they ransack a house before being interrupted by its occupants, who are shot in cold blood. Billy, who at first admires his brothers, does not want to participate and only wishes to go home, but nonetheless observes the crimes being committed. They visit their mother, a prostitute who pays them little attention. The group make their way to West Virginia on foot before being arrested and the three escapees are convicted of murder in 1974. Billy testifies for the prosecution but receives a life sentence for his participation.

== Cast ==
- Henry Thomas as Billy Isaacs (Narrator)
- James Wilder as Carl Isaacs
- Stephen Shellen as Wayne Coleman
- Erroll Slue as George Dungee

== Production ==
Fleming 'Tex' Fuller wrote the screenplay based on his 1977 award-winning documentary of the same name about the 1973 Alday family murders. Fuller sold the screenplay to SC Entertainment, a Toronto-based production company, who specialize in low-budget, little-known Canadian films.

It was planned that Fuller would direct the movie in addition to writing the screenplay, however after one week of principal photography he was fired and replaced by Graeme Campbell on one day's notice. After production wrapped in November 1987, Fuller sued SC Entertainment to prevent the movie being distributed, and with claims that Fuller was only paid $17,000 of the original $90,000 plus royalties scriptwriting and directing package deal. Allegations were made that the Fuller was fired to take advantage of Canadian film tax credits that required either the scriptwriter or director to be Canadian. Shortly before filming was completed, Henry Thomas and his mother Carolyn expressed concern about the changes in direction and also script alterations after Fuller's departure.

Film-makers opted to keep the horror of the murders to a minimum by ensuring the brutality was occurring off-screen, yet leaving the viewer in no doubt as to what was happening. Despite being set in the United States, it was shot in and around Toronto. Shooting wrapped around the beginning of November 1987 at a farmhouse north of the city.

=== Differences to real life events ===
The film was criticized for its inaccurate portrayal of real-life events it purported to be based on. In the film, Billy Isaacs is portrayed as a "sympathetic character" by filmmakers, despite pleading guilty to kidnap and burglary. His sentence was 40 years, although in the film this was given as 100 years.

== Release ==
The film was widely released in Canada in May 1988, with release in the US in the fall. It wasn't released in southwest Georgia near where the killings took place, so as not to offend people.

== Reception ==
During its original May 1988 Canadian release, Greg Quill of Toronto Star criticized the bare-bones script and lacklustre directing. It also notes that Thomas's acting was overshadowed by Shellen and Wilder's standard performance.

The Los Angeles Times said, "If “Murder One” isn't a good movie, it still springs from a disturbing insight. It's about the crazy reasons people cross what should be impassable moral lines." Bill Cotterell writing for the Tallahassee Democrat was critical, questioning the capability of filmmakers and criticizing the inaccurate portrayal of real-life events.

Dennis Schwartz said of the film, "I doubt if there’s a wide audience willing to sit through this bloody horror story. I don’t recommend it." Writing for The Atlanta Constitution, Eleanor Ringel described the film as "flat" and "appallingly underwritten", reserving the minimal praise for Henry Thomas, who narrates much of the film and was described by Ringel as having done "a reasonably competent job". She criticized the movie's lack of identity that "reeks of inauthenticity". Strong criticism was conveyed by Todd Sussman, writing for The Miami News, who described the movie as "uninspiring", "dreary" and with dull acting with "no redeeming value". Sussman was surprised by the inclusion of Thomas in the cast, who he considered "would have done well to avoid" participation in the film.

Reviewer Sam Mirkin, writing for The South Bend Tribune, had a favorable opinion on the film, praising the cast performances as "excellent", especially Thomas who was considered "especially excellent". Merkin felt that writer and director Tex Fuller deserved credit for creating a film that avoided "chase-and-shoot film-making", although felt that it wasn't a particularly pleasant film to watch.
