= Melbert Ford =

American murderer (1960–2010)

- Born: December 9, 1960; Austell, Georgia, U.S.
- Died: June 9, 2010 (aged 49); Georgia Diagnostic and Classification State Prison, Georgia, U.S.
- Occupation: Grocery store employee
- Status: Executed by lethal injection
- Convictions: Murder (2 counts); Armed robbery
- Penalty: Death (October 23, 1986)

Melbert Ray Ford Jr. (December 9, 1960 – June 9, 2010) was an American convicted double murderer who, in 2010, was executed by lethal injection by the U.S. State of Georgia after being convicted of murder in 1987.

Ford was born in Austell, Georgia. He was convicted in 1987 of killing his former girlfriend, Martha Chapman Matich, and Lisa Chapman, her 11-year-old niece, in a March 6, 1986 robbery at Chapman's Grocery store in Georgia. Ford had told a friend that he "was going to blow her brains out," and devised a plan to rob the store, saying he intended to kidnap Matich, take her into the woods, make her beg and then shoot her in the forehead.

== Execution ==
Ford was executed by lethal injection on June 9, 2010. He was the 24th inmate put to death by lethal injection in the U.S. state of Georgia. He was previously granted a 90-day stay in mid-February because there was a vacancy on the Georgia Board of Pardons and Paroles. A court had previously held that to go forward with an execution without a full five-member board is a violation of the Georgia Constitution.

Georgia's Supreme Court rejected an appeal from Ford on June 9. which could have stayed his execution on the same day. The Georgia Supreme Court unanimously denied Ford's motion to halt his execution. On June 9, 2010, Ford was executed by lethal injection. He had requested a last meal of fried fish and shrimp, baked potato, salad, boiled corn, ice cream, cheesecake and soda.

== See also ==
- List of people executed in Georgia (U.S. state)
- List of people executed in the United States in 2010
