= Capital punishment in Georgia (U.S. state) =

Capital punishment is a legal penalty in the U.S. state of Georgia. Georgia reintroduced the death penalty in 1973 after Furman v. Georgia ruled all states' death penalty statutes unconstitutional. The first execution to take place afterwards occurred in 1983.

77 people in total have been executed since 1983 as of March 21, 2024. As of June 30, 2026, 32 men and 1 woman are on death row awaiting execution.

== History ==
The first execution in Georgia was in 1735. The offender was a white female indentured servant Alice Riley, who had murdered her master. From 1735 to 1924, the method of execution was hanging. The last hanging occurred in 1931. Between 1735 and 1931, over 500 hangings occurred in Georgia. In August, 1924, the Georgia General Assembly outlawed hanging and introduced electrocution instead. Georgia then used this method until 1972, when Furman v. Georgia declared the capital punishment procedures unconstitutional. Electrocution was re-instated, along with the death penalty, in 1976 as a result of Gregg v. Georgia. In 2001, the General Assembly passed a new law instituting lethal injection instead of electrocution.

Overall, 1,022 executions have occurred in Georgia since 1735, the fifth highest total in the union.

== Legal process ==
When the prosecution seeks the death penalty, the sentence is decided by the jury and must be unanimous.

In case of a hung jury during the punishment phase of the trial, a life sentence is issued, even if a single juror opposed death (there is no retrial).

The power of clemency belongs to the Georgia State Board of Pardons and Paroles, which consists of five members appointed by the governor with advice and consent of the state senate.

Lethal injection is the only method of execution authorised by statutes, after electrocution was abolished in 2001.

== Death row ==
Georgia's death row, which is located at the Georgia Diagnostic and Classification Prison for men and located at Arrendale State Prison for women, holds a central place in U.S. capital punishment history, particularly following the 1972 Furman v. Georgia decision. The state has executed over 60 people since 1976, transitioning from electrocution to lethal injection as the primary method in 2001. However, as of late 2025, Georgia has a small, declining death row population, with roughly 32 men and one woman awaiting execution.

== Capital crimes ==
The following are the current capital crimes in the state of Georgia:

- Treason
- Aircraft hijacking
- Murder with one of the following aggravating circumstances:
  - The offender has a prior record of conviction for a capital felony;
  - The offender was in the process of committing another capital felony or aggravated battery, or the offense of murder was committed while the offender was engaged in the commission of burglary in any degree or arson in the first degree;
  - The offender knowingly created a great risk of death to more than one person in a public place by means of a weapon or device which would normally be hazardous to the lives of more than one person;
  - The offender committed the offense of murder for himself or another, for the purpose of receiving money or any other thing of monetary value;
  - The murder of a judicial officer, former judicial officer, district attorney or solicitor-general, or former district attorney, solicitor, or solicitor-general was committed during or because of the exercise of his or her official duties;
  - The offender caused or directed another to commit murder or committed murder as an agent or employee of another person;
  - The capital offense was outrageously or wantonly vile, horrible, or inhuman in that it involved torture, depravity of mind, or an aggravated battery to the victim;
  - The offense of murder was committed against any peace officer, corrections employee, or firefighter while engaged in the performance of his official duties;.
  - The offense of murder was committed by a person in, or who has escaped from, the lawful custody of a peace officer or place of lawful confinement;
  - The murder was committed for the purpose of avoiding, interfering with, or preventing a lawful arrest or custody in a place of lawful confinement, of himself or another;
  - The capital offense was committed by a person previously convicted of rape, aggravated sodomy, aggravated child molestation, or aggravated sexual battery;
  - The murder was committed during an act of domestic terrorism.

Some of these aggravating factors apply also to rape, armed robbery, or kidnapping. However, in 2008, the U.S. Supreme Court ruled in Kennedy v. Louisiana, that the death penalty is unconstitutional when applied to non-homicidal crimes against the person. However, the ruling meant that crimes "against the state" such as treason or terrorism would not likely be unconstitutional. Therefore, the offenses of treason and aircraft hijacking would likely be considered a crime against the state in Georgia, and the death penalty, in this case, may be constitutional.

== See also ==
- List of people executed in Georgia (U.S. state)
- List of people executed in Georgia (U.S. state) (pre-1972)
- List of death row inmates in the United States § Georgia
- Crime in Georgia (U.S. state)
- Law of Georgia (U.S. state)
