= Warrior policing =

Warrior policing is a phenomenon where officers believe that they are warriors fighting crime. This is instilled in young recruits as they train in the academy. They show up to routine calls with this warrior mentality with the belief that it will bring them home at the end of their shift, protecting themselves from anyone they believe will bring harm. This is the opposite of the guardian policing style. Guardian-style policing is when cops think of themselves as protectors of the community. Warrior-style policing is argued to keep cops and communities safer. The term has been used by scholars, commentators, and policy researchers to describe a model of policing that emphasizes danger, force, and officer survival, in contrast to approaches that stress service, restraint, and accountability.

== History ==
The background behind this mindset can be traced back as early as the 1960s. There was political unrest across the United States as Americans watched the racially-profiled Whitman mass shooting, riots, and the rising crime rate. To combat these issues, officer Daryl Gates of the Los Angeles Police Department came up with the idea of SWAT in 1967. Gates originally called SWAT "Special Weapons Attack Teams" but later changed the name to "Special Weapons and Tactics." SWAT was used to counteract violent situations such as riots or massacres. The first time SWAT had been deployed was 1969 to raid a Black Panther building. Due to the rapid escalation of the situation, officers were granted the usage of a grenade launcher on the building.

In addition to SWAT, President Lyndon B. Johnson created Law Enforcement Assistance Administration, more commonly known as LEAA, in 1968. LEAA streamlined federal funding, technology, and equipment to law enforcement nationwide. Around $6.6 billion went to state and local agencies, mostly for riot control. This was a part of Johnson's war on crime and his war on drugs, which his successor, President Nixon, continued.

Despite LEAA being discontinued in 1982, the framework had already been laid for warrior policing, with SWAT being granted permission to utilize a grenade launcher. By the 1980s, the Pentagon was handing out military-grade equipment to law enforcement for everyday use, including grenade launchers. In 1997, this was furthered by Congress passing the National Defense Authorization Act. In this act, there was a provision that allowed for the creation of what is more commonly known as the 1033 Program. This established the Law Enforcement Support Program, whose mission was to further the streamlining of military-grade weapons to local law enforcement agencies.

In 2011, the 1033 program claimed that it had their most productive year yet. That year, the program reutilized $500 million in military-grade equipment to local law enforcement. There was a hope to beat the 2011 fiscal year achievement in the 2012 fiscal year. However, there was a brief period where the 1033 program was shut down: in June 2012, the program was discontinued due to press reports of mismanagement by some law enforcement agencies. By November 2012, the program was back up and running.

== Training ==
The warrior mindset begins to be taught to young recruits as early as the first day. While at the academy, recruits are taught to use both the guardian and the warrior mindset on the job; however, to use the guardian mindset, they must first use the warrior mindset. To do this, instructors give recruits an enemy, who is out to harm the public and officers. Cadets are then asked to identify the enemy in a radicalized way. Instructors then ask their recruits to adopt the warrior mindset as they shift away from civilian to officer.

Asking cadets to conceptualize an enemy is not the only way instructors enforce this mindset. Cadets are told stories of unpredictable danger by retired officers. They are also shown graphic videos of cops who have been brutally beaten or even killed while on the job. They are shown these videos frequently as a reminder to not let their guards down. One video that is shown frequently is Deputy Kyle Dinkheller being shot. Cadets are taught that Dinkheller, instead of pulling his baton, should have pulled his gun. When there is defiance, cadets are supposed to force the suspect to comply then. This can cause officers to resort to only force in difficult situations instead of utilizing other resources. This is to ensure the biggest priority for trainees: that they will make it home at the end of their shift.

The academy has been described as a place where cadets lose their personality and build a new one surrounding this mindset. Cadets become hypervigilant. Some officers follow the belief that to survive on the job, they must remain humble, courteous, professional and compassionate - but have a plan to kill everyone they meet; the American streets are a battleground.

== Post 9/11 ==
During the 1990s, the United States dominated the militarization of law enforcement. However, after the 9/11 attacks, this militarization furthered. The Department of Justice's (DOJ) International Association of Chiefs of Police (IACP) bureau created a document of their findings of post-9/11 policing, which focused on strengthening response tactics. Specifically, there was an emphasis placed on fiscal and resource conditions, the changing relationships with federal law enforcement agencies, and other forms of change, such as technology, workplace conditions and expectations. The IACP underwent strategic planning, which included technology upgrades. These upgrades included personal protective equipment, biohazard protection, K-9's and bomb equipment, mobile command centers, and bomb ordnance. They also reported that studies in law enforcement showed that there was an increase in intelligence, technology, and information.
