= Christopher Chubasco Wilkins =

American spree killer (1968–2017)

- Wilkins shortly before his execution
- Born: September 29, 1968; Harris County, Texas, U.S.
- Died: January 11, 2017 (aged 48); Huntsville Unit, Huntsville, Texas, U.S.
- Cause of death: Execution by lethal injection
- Conviction: Capital murder (March 2008)
- Penalty: Death (March 12, 2008)

Details
- Victims: Gilbert Vallejo, 47; Willie Freeman, 40; Mike Silva, 33
- Date: October 26–28, 2005
- Date apprehended: November 2005

Christopher Chubasco Wilkins (September 29, 1968 – January 11, 2017) was a Texas spree killer who was sentenced to death and executed for a 2005 double murder.

== Murders ==
In October 2005, Wilkins was offered crack cocaine by 40-year-old Willie Freeman, a local drug dealer. However, Freeman instead gave Wilkins a piece of gravel for $20. When Wilkins discovered the ruse, Freeman and his supplier, 33-year-old Mike Silva, started laughing at him. Over the next few weeks, however, Wilkins and Freeman used drugs together. Freeman eventually apologized for tricking Wilkins and gave him actual drugs to make up for it. Wilkins later said that by then, he had already decided he was going to kill Freeman.

On October 27, 2005, Wilkins told Freeman that he had guns and drugs stashed on the west side of Fort Worth. Silva agreed to drive them there the next day. Wilkins directed Silva to a deserted stretch of road. While Silva was driving, Wilkins shot Freeman in the head. Silva stopped and tried to escape, but got caught in his seatbelt. Wilkins shot him once in the neck and twice in the head. Wilkins then got into the driver's seat and started driving, with Silva's body hanging out. He later dumped the bodies in a ditch on the side of the road.

The numbers "666" and a pentagram matching one of Wilkins' numerous tattoos were found carved into Silva's car at the scene of the murders. Wilkins' fingerprints were also found. The previous day, Wilkins had also killed Gilbert Vallejo, 47, outside a bar in south Fort Worth after a dispute over a payphone.

About a week earlier, Wilkins used a stolen Ford Explorer that he had taken days prior from a home burglary and picked up a prostitute. Wilkins had switched the plates to a similar make and model vehicle. The prostitute became nervous soon after Wilkins picked her up after running over several individuals on East Lancaster Ave. The behavior prompted the prostitute to solicit Wilkins to stop at a nearby convenience store, where she contacted 911. Fort Worth Police Officer J. Parsons and Sgt. Weber responded, and a high speed chase ensued into Haltom City. After Wilkins wrecked out and fled on foot, he was apprehended after shouting to police to kill him. Wilkins had methamphetamine and stolen property inside the vehicle.

== Trial ==
On October 28, 2005, Wilkins was arrested and charged with the murders of Freeman and Silva; he later also confessed to murdering Vallejo. While in jail awaiting trial, Wilkins, plotting an escape, swallowed a handcuff key and made a makeshift knife. He was found guilty of capital murder, and sentenced to death on March 12, 2008, after only 90 minutes of deliberation by the jury. When asked by his defense lawyer if he wanted to die, Wilkins said: "I guess, subconsciously, I've been trying to get myself killed since I was 12 or 13 years old. I don't have nothing to live for. I haven't been any good to anybody for the last 20 years and I won't be for the next 20 or the 20 after that." Wilkins told jurors that he was not mentally ill and could not blame his crimes on drugs. "When I get wound up, I have a fuse that is short. I don't think about what I am doing. I don't care," he said.

== Execution ==
Wilkins was initially scheduled to be executed on October 28, 2015 (which, coincidentally, was the 10th anniversary of his arrest). His execution was stayed and later rescheduled to January 11, 2017. Wilkins was executed by lethal injection on January 11, 2017, at 6:29 p.m. He was 48 years old. Wilkins had no last words but mouthed that he was sorry to the relatives of his victims.

== See also ==
- Capital punishment in Texas
- Crime in Texas
- List of people executed in Texas, 2010–2019
- List of people executed in the United States in 2017
- List of white defendants executed for killing a black victim
- Race and capital punishment in the United States

Executions carried out in Texas
Preceded by Barney Ronald Fuller Jr. October 5, 2016	Christopher Chubasco Wilkins; January 11, 2017	Succeeded by Rolando Ruiz Jr. March 7, 2017
Executions carried out in the United States
Preceded by Ronald Bert Smith Jr. – Alabama December 8, 2016	Christopher Chubasco Wilkins – Texas; January 11, 2017	Succeeded by Ricky Javon Gray – Virginia January 18, 2017
White defendants executed for killing a black victim in the United States
Preceded by Harry D. Mitts Jr. – Ohio September 25, 2013	Christopher Chubasco Wilkins – Texas; January 11, 2017	Succeeded by William Charles Morva – Virginia July 6, 2017
