= Juan Martin Garcia =

American murderer (1980–2015)

- Born: February 18, 1980; Harris County, Texas, U.S.
- Died: October 6, 2015 (aged 35); Huntsville Unit, Huntsville, Texas, U.S.
- Cause of death: Execution by lethal injection
- Status: Executed
- Conviction: Capital murder
- Penalty: Death (June 21, 2000)

Details
- Victims: Hugo Solano, 36
- Date: September 17, 1998

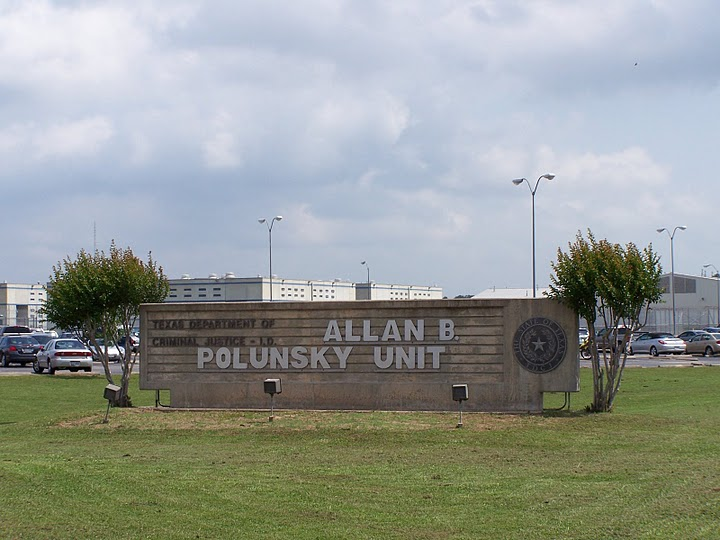
Allan B. Polunsky Unit houses the State of Texas death row for men.

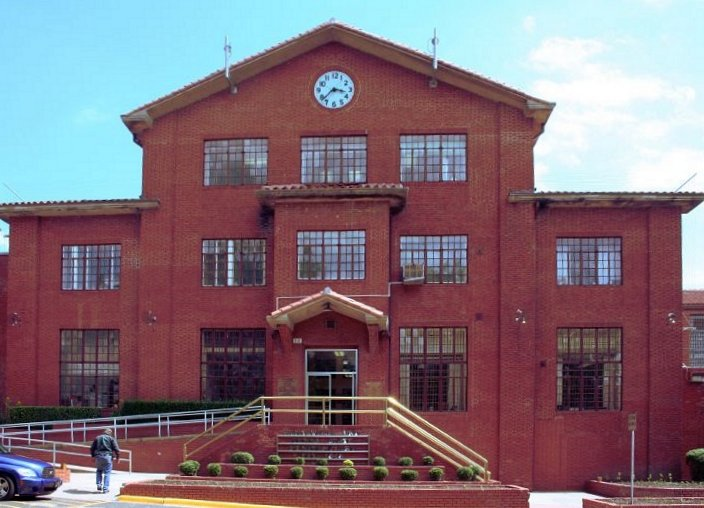
Huntsville Unit, the location of the Texas state execution chamber.

Juan Martín García (February 18, 1980 – October 6, 2015) was a Texas man who was executed for capital murder.

On September 17, 1998, Garcia attempted to rob Hugo Solano, a 36-year old Christian missionary from Guadalajara, Mexico who had moved to Houston to provide a U.S. education for his children. Garcia, a U.S. citizen, was of Salvadoran descent, and his native county was Harris County. Garcia, a gang member, had a history of criminal activity involving assault, making a "terroristic threat" towards a teacher, theft, and trespassing.

Garcia, with three other men, did the robbery attempt at an apartment complex at the 17000 block of Cali in unincorporated Harris County. He shot Solano three times after Solano refused to give him his wallet and received $8. García said that he shot Solano out of panic.

Garcia, Texas Department of Criminal Justice (TDCJ)#999360, arrived on death row on June 21, 2000. While on death row he was in Polunsky Unit. He was executed at Huntsville Unit, on October 6, 2015. Garcia apologized to Ana Solano, Garcia's widow, and her daughter before he was executed. He was the 11th death row prisoner to be executed in Texas in 2015.

== See also ==
- List of people executed in Texas, 2010–2019
- List of people executed in the United States in 2015

Executions carried out in Texas
Preceded by Daniel Lee Lopez; August 12, 2015	Juan Martin Garcia; October 6, 2015	Succeeded by Licho Escamilla; October 14, 2015
Executions carried out in the United States
Preceded by Alfredo Rolando Prieto – Virginia; October 1, 2015	Juan Martin Garcia – Texas; October 6, 2015	Succeeded by Licho Escamilla – Florida; October 14, 2015
