= Alfredo Prieto =

Salvadoran-American serial killer (1965–2015)

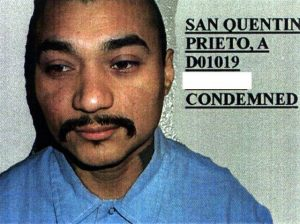
- Born: Alfredo Rolando Prieto; November 18, 1965; San Martín, El Salvador
- Died: October 1, 2015 (aged 49); Greensville Correctional Center, Virginia, U.S.
- Status: Executed by lethal injection
- Convictions: California; First degree murder with special circumstances Kidnapping (3 counts); Forcible rape (3 counts); Robbery (2 counts); Attempted robbery (2 counts); Possession of a firearm by a felon Virginia; Capital murder (2 counts); Rape; Grand larceny Use of a firearm in the commission of a felony (2 counts)
- Penalty: Death (California and Virginia)

Details
- Victims: 9
- Span of crimes: 1988–1990
- Country: United States
- States: Virginia and California
- Date apprehended: September 6, 1990

Alfredo Rolando Prieto (November 18, 1965 – October 1, 2015) was a Salvadoran-American serial killer. After being initially convicted for a single murder, he was later connected to eight other murders committed in Virginia and California between May 1988 and September 1990 via DNA profiling. Sentenced to death in both states, Prieto was executed by lethal injection in Virginia in 2015.

== Biography ==
Alfredo Prieto was born on November 18, 1965, in San Martín, San Salvador, El Salvador. He was one of six children born to parents Arnoldo and Teodora Prieto. He spent his childhood and adolescence in poverty since his parents experienced heavy financial difficulties during the Football War. Prieto's mother left El Salvador in 1975 due to her husband's abuse and emigrated to the United States. During the outbreak of the Salvadoran Civil War, Alfredo reportedly witnessed many civilians being killed, including his grandfather. Prieto would subsequently be diagnosed with PTSD.

In 1981, his mother retrieved her children from El Salvador, settling in Pomona, California, where Alfredo and his siblings attended Pomona High School. During high school, Prieto became addicted to drugs and alcohol. Around this time, he and his brother Guillermo met Sandra Figueroa, whose brothers were members of a local street gang named "456 Island Piru." Prieto joined the gang, dropped out of school, and married Figueroa. The couple had a child in 1984. In August 1984, Prieto shot three people in Ontario, claiming his wife had cheated on him with one of the wounded men. His wife later said that Prieto subjected her to sexual abuse and aggression, which he denied.

In late 1984, he was found guilty of the shootings, but since the victims were rival gang members, the court showed leniency to him. He received a short prison sentence and was released in 1987, after which he left California and moved to Virginia. He settled in Arlington County, Virginia, where his father had emigrated after serving a murder conviction in El Salvador. Once in Arlington, Prieto found a job and met another girl, who later bore him a son. At the end of 1989, his father was arrested and jailed for raping a woman. In February 1990, Prieto left the state and moved back to California.

== Murder of Yvette Woodruff ==
Early in the morning of September 2, 1990, Prieto, along with 29-year-old Vincent Lopez and 33-year-old Danny Sorian, robbed Anthony Rangela in Ontario. They then took him hostage and drove to his house, where Rangela lived with his 33-year-old aunt Emily D., her 17-year-old daughter Lisa H. and Lisa's friend, 15-year-old Yvette Woodruff. They kidnapped the woman and girls and drove to the outskirts of the city, but along the way, Lopez refused to participate any further and left the car. He was replaced by another friend of Prieto's, Ricardo Estrada, whom they came across while buying gasoline at a gas station. They raped the woman and girls in an abandoned building in an industrial zone on the eastern outskirts of the city. Prieto shot and killed Woodruff, while Sorian and Estrada stabbed Emily D. and Lisa H. before leaving the scene. Despite severe injuries and extensive blood loss, Emily D. and Lisa H. survived and managed to call the police. They were taken to the hospital, where they testified about the attack. On that same day, the police found Woodruff's body, and a few days later, the car which the criminals had used.

Prieto and his accomplices were discovered after street informants learned about the crime and contacted the authorities. Police swiftly arrested Prieto and the others involved between September 6–22, 1990. A pistol belonging to one of the victims was found at Prieto's apartment and determined to be the murder weapon.

== Trials and exposure ==
Prieto was later charged with first degree murder, rape, kidnapping and robbery. By jury verdict, he was found guilty on January 21, 1992, on all charges, receiving the death sentence. Twelve days later, he was transferred to San Quentin State Prison, where he would spend the next 14 years awaiting execution on death row.

In 2005, a law was passed obligating all convicts in the state to submit their DNA, resulting in Prieto's DNA being entered into the national database.

In early 2006, Prieto's DNA was matched to eight more murders committed between 1988 and 1990: the 1988 rape and murder of 24-year-old Veronica "Tina" Lynn Jefferson in Arlington, the murder of 22-year-old Rachael Raver and her 22-year-old fiancé, Warren Fulton III, in Reston; and the 1989 murder of 27-year-old Manuel Sermeno in Prince William County near I-95.

On May 5, 1990, Prieto was shown to have killed 19-year-old Stacey Siegrist and her 21-year-old fiancé, Anthony Gianuzzi, in Rubidoux, California. Siegrist was sexually assaulted before being shot.

On June 2, 1990, Prieto killed Lula Mae Farley in an alley behind an Ontario supermarket where she and her husband were collecting recyclables, according to 1990 news coverage. After witnessing the murder of his wife, Herbert Farley was then abducted and later found shot to death in Rubidoux. Another individual, 19-year-old Steven Valdez, was arrested as a suspect in these killings, but later released after a key witness was inconsistent in identifying him as the shooter.

Following these revelations, the Fairfax County Attorney's Office brought a number of charges against Alfredo Prieto, resulting in his extradition from San Quentin on April 28, 2006, to Virginia, where he was due to stand trial. Since Virginia death row inmates exhausted their appeals far more quickly than they did in California, officials there believed that Prieto's death sentence could be carried out in Virginia long before he exhausted his appeals in California.

The first trial for the Raver-Fulton murders began in 2007, with Prieto initially being found guilty by a jury. However, the trial judge was forced to declare a mistrial during the penalty phase, after one juror claimed he had been peer pressured into going along with the guilty verdict. A second trial for the murders took place in 2008, with Prieto being convicted again and receiving two death sentences. Prieto's lawyers filed an appeal, and the Virginia Supreme Court overturned the sentence based on an error in the jury verdict form. Prieto was subsequently resentenced, and again received death sentences.

A year later, his lawyers filed another appeal to overturn his sentence and asking for a new trial, based on the results from a psychiatric exam which determined that their client was intellectually disabled, with an IQ threshold between 67 and 73. Their petition was accepted, but at the third trial, the prosecutor's office proved to the court that Prieto had been a successful student at school in both El Salvador and the United States, and that he had adapted socially, had perfectly learned the English language, was popular and obtained a driver's license in both Virginia and California, which contradicted the notions of an intellectual disability. He was sentenced to death for a third and final time in 2010 by Judge Randy Bellows.

== Execution ==
On October 1, 2015, Prieto was executed by lethal injection at the Greensville Correctional Center at 9:17 p.m., in the presence of state witnesses and some of the victims' family members. Shortly before his execution, his lawyers filed a lawsuit to delay the execution date on the grounds that drugs used for the process were unsafe. They demanded information about the shelf life of pentobarbital, which the state had received from Texas in exchange for another sedative, midazolam, which had expired. Among other things, his lawyers sought to force the state to disclose the name of the pharmaceutical company producing the drug in order to determine its quality so they could prevent the physical torture of their client during the execution, but this suit was dismissed. Prieto gave a brief final statement, saying "I would like to say thanks to all my lawyers, all my supporters and all my family members. Get this over with."

== See also ==
- List of people executed in Virginia
- List of people executed in the United States in 2015
- List of serial killers in the United States
- Kelvin Malone, sentenced to death in California but executed in a different state
- Glen Edward Rogers, sentenced to death in California but executed in a different state

Executions carried out in Virginia
Preceded by Robert Gleason January 16, 2013	Alfredo Prieto; October 1, 2015	Succeeded by Ricky Javon Gray January 18, 2017
Executions carried out in the United States
Preceded by Kelly Gissendaner – Georgia September 30, 2015	Alfredo Prieto – Virginia; October 1, 2015	Succeeded by Juan Martin Garcia – Texas October 6, 2015
