= Robert Charles Ladd =

Executed American serial killer

- Born: March 19, 1957; Dallas, Texas, U.S.
- Died: January 29, 2015 (aged 57); Huntsville Unit, Texas, U.S.
- Status: Executed by lethal injection
- Convictions: Capital murder Murder (3 counts)
- Penalty: Death (Garner); 40 years (Thompson); 20 years (arson)

Details
- Victims: 4
- Span of crimes: 1978–1996
- Country: United States
- State: Texas
- Date apprehended: For the final time on September 25, 1996

Robert Charles Ladd (March 19, 1957 – January 29, 2015) was an American serial killer who was convicted and sentenced to death for murdering a woman in Tyler, Texas, in 1996, after being paroled for a 1978 triple murder in Dallas. He was executed for the latter crime in 2015, which was a controversial decision due to his alleged mental disability.

== Triple murder ==
In October 1978, Ladd broke into the Dallas apartment of 18-year-old Vivian Geanett Thompson, whom he proceeded to stab ten times in the back, neck, chest, and abdomen. He then put her body in the closet and set it on fire, with the fire quickly spreading to the rest of the apartment. While Ladd managed to escape in time, Thompson's two children, 3-year-old Maurice and 18-month-old Latoya, died from smoke inhalation. By the time the fire was extinguished, Vivian and Maurice's bodies were so severely burned that they had been fused together.

A few weeks later, Ladd was indicted on capital murder and arson charges in relation to the murders. He pleaded guilty to these charges and was sentenced to 40 years imprisonment for murder and 20 years for arson, respectively. However, as the law required that he be granted mandatory parole, he was allowed to leave after serving only 12 years of his sentence, whereupon he moved to Tyler and found work as a barber.

=== New murder and arrest ===
Approximately six years after his release, on September 24, 1996, Ladd broke into the home of 38-year-old Vicki Ann Garner, a mentally-ill woman who worked in the copy room of a local rehabilitation facility where Ladd also worked at the time. He then proceeded to tie her hands above her head, rape her, and then ransack the apartment for valuables, before bludgeoning Garner to death with a hammer. Ladd then apparently left and returned to the apartment on at least two or possibly three occasions before deciding to set it on fire to cover his tracks. From there, he went to a friend's house, where he sold him a TV, video cassette recorder, a microwave, and a cordless phone he had stolen from the apartment in exchange for $100 to buy crack cocaine.

Analysis of physical evidence located at the crime scene quickly implicated Ladd in the murder, resulting in his arrest the following day. As he refused to cooperate with authorities, investigators focused on gathering potential witnesses that could conclusively place him on the crime scene.

== Trial, imprisonment, and execution ==
A psychiatric evaluation conducted before Ladd's trial concluded that he had an antisocial personality disorder, lacked any remorse, and was at great risk of reoffending if released again. This assessment, coupled with the physical evidence that tied him to the crime scene, led to him being found guilty on all charges after the jury deliberated less than 18 minutes – a record for Smith County at the time. Gene Garner, Vicki's father, welcomed the death sentence and announced his intention to attend Ladd's execution whenever it was carried out.

In January 2000, a district judge granted a stay of execution to Ladd that allowed him to pursue a federal appeal, despite the fact that no execution date had been set for him yet. This appeal was submitted to SCOTUS, which refused to review the case. An execution date for him was eventually set for April 24, 2003, but only nine hours prior, his attorneys submitted an appeal to the Fifth Circuit Court of Appeals alleging that they had located a document dating to Ladd's childhood that put his IQ at 67, meaning that he was technically considered intellectually disabled and thus ineligible for execution. While a reprieve was granted for this, it was later found that Ladd's high school equivalency degree put his IQ at 86, and that he had also attended several college classes before dropping out. Garner's family, who was en route to the Huntsville Unit when they learned of the decision, was greatly dissatisfied with the ruling and claimed that it just prolonged their suffering.

More than a decade later, Ladd's new execution date was set for January 29, 2015. His lawyers failed to successfully appeal it, and on the aforementioned date, he was executed via lethal injection at the Huntsville Unit. Before his execution, Ladd apologized to Garner's family members and said his goodbyes to his family. His official final words, uttered to his sister, were "I love you. Let's ride." They were followed shortly after by complaints that his arm was stinging after being injected with the needle. On the day of his execution, approximately 15 to 20 anti-death penalty protests had gathered outside the prison, exclaiming that the state of Texas had no moral right to execute people. He was the 1,400th inmate to be executed in the United States since 1976.

Ladd is buried at Captain Joe Byrd Cemetery.

== See also ==
- Capital punishment in Texas
- List of people executed by lethal injection
- List of people executed in Texas, 2010–2019
- List of people executed in the United States in 2015
- List of serial killers in the United States

Executions carried out in Texas
Preceded by Arnold Prieto Jr. January 21, 2015	Robert Charles Ladd; January 29, 2015	Succeeded by Donald Keith Newbury; February 4, 2015
Executions carried out in the United States
Preceded by Warren Lee Hill Jr. – Georgia; January 27, 2015	Robert Charles Ladd – Texas; January 29, 2015	Succeeded by Donald Keith Newbury – Texas; February 4, 2015
