= Warren Hill (murderer) =

American murderer (1960–2015)

- Born: Warren Lee Hill Jr. June 28, 1960
- Died: January 27, 2015 (aged 54); Georgia Diagnostic and Classification Prison, Georgia, U.S.
- Status: Executed by lethal injection
- Conviction: Murder (2 counts)
- Penalty: Death (September 1991)

Details
- Victims: Myra Wright, 18; Joseph Handspike, 34
- Date: May 30, 1985; August 17, 1990
- Country: United States
- State: Georgia

Warren Lee Hill Jr. (June 28, 1960 – January 27, 2015) was a prisoner executed in Georgia in the United States. Hill was originally sentenced to life imprisonment for murdering his girlfriend, 18-year-old Myra Wright, whom he shot 11 times on May 30, 1985. He was subsequently sentenced to death for killing his cellmate, 34-year-old convicted murderer Joseph Handspike. On August 17, 1990, Hill killed Handspike in their cell by bludgeoning him to death with a wooden board studded with nails while horrified onlooking prisoners pleaded with him to stop.

His execution by lethal injection, scheduled for July 15, 2013, was postponed due to a legal challenge against Georgia's Lethal Injection Secrecy Act. This law, passed in March 2013, makes the identities of companies and individuals who make and supply lethal injection drugs, and the identities of the doctors hired by the state to oversee executions, a "state secret" that must be shielded from disclosure to the public, the media, and even the judiciary. Hill's lawyers argued that this would prevent Hill from knowing whether the execution would be carried out by competent personnel using properly formulated drugs. The secrecy regime was ultimately upheld by the Georgia Supreme Court.

There was also controversy as to whether or not Hill qualified as being mentally disabled, a designation that would have precluded him from being executed. On this basis of his mental capabilities the European Union had appealed several times to the Georgia Chairman of the Board of Pardons and Paroles and Georgia Governor Nathan Deal to prevent Hill from being executed. Hill was executed on January 27, 2015.

== See also ==
- Atkins v. Virginia
- List of people executed in Georgia (U.S. state)
- List of people executed in the United States in 2015

Executions carried out in Georgia
Preceded by Andrew Howard Brannan January 13, 2015	Warren Hill; January 27, 2015	Succeeded by Kelly Gissendaner September 30, 2015
Executions carried out in the United States
Preceded by Arnold Prieto Jr. – Texas January 21, 2015	Warren Hill – Georgia; January 27, 2015	Succeeded by Robert Charles Ladd – Texas January 29, 2015
