= List of people executed in Texas, 2010–2019 =

The following is a list of people executed by the U.S. state of Texas between 2010 and 2019. All of the 120 people (117 males and 3 females) during this period were convicted of murder and executed by lethal injection at the Huntsville Unit in Huntsville, Texas.

== Executions 2010–2019 ==
The number in the "#" column indicates the nth person executed since 1982 (when Texas resumed the death penalty). As an example, Kenneth Mosley (the first person executed in Texas during the 2010 decade) was the 448th person executed since resumption of the death penalty.

2010 – 17 executions
#	Executed person	Ethnicity	Age	Sex	Date of execution	County	Victim(s)	Governor
448	Kenneth Mosley	Black	51	M	07-Jan-2010	Dallas	Garland police officer Michael David Moore	Rick Perry
449	Gary James Johnson	White	59	M	12-Jan-2010	Walker	James Matthew Hazelton and Peter Joseph Sparagana	Rick Perry
450	Michael Adam Sigala	Hispanic	32	M	02-Mar-2010	Collin	Kleber Dos Santos and Lilian Dos Santos	Rick Perry
451	Joshua Maxwell	White	31	M	11-Mar-2010	Bexar	Bexar County Sheriff's Deputy Rudolfo Lopes (Note: Also killed Robby Bott in Indiana, but was executed for killing Lopes.)	Rick Perry
452	Franklin DeWayne Alix	Black	34	M	30-Mar-2010	Harris	4 murder victims (Note: The 4 victims were: Gregorio Ramirez, Selemawi Tewolde, Eric Bridgeford, and Christopher Thomas.)	Rick Perry
453	William Josef Berkley	White	31	M	22-Apr-2010	El Paso	Sophia Martinez	Rick Perry
454	Samuel Bustamante	Hispanic	40	M	27-Apr-2010	Fort Bend	Rafael Alvarado (Note: Also killed Lloyd Harold Turner, but was executed for killing Alvarado.)	Rick Perry
455	Kevin Scott Varga	White	41	M	12-May-2010	Hunt	U.S. Army Major David Lawrence Logie (Note: Also killed David McCoy in Kansas, but was executed for killing Logie.)	Rick Perry
456	Billy John Galloway	White	41	M	13-May-2010	Hunt	U.S. Army Major David Lawrence Logie	Rick Perry
457	Rogelio Reyes Cannady	Hispanic	37	M	19-May-2010	Bee	Leovigildo Bombale Bonal (Note: Also killed Ricardo Garcia and Ana Robles, but was executed for killing Bonal.)	Rick Perry
458	John Avalos Alba	Hispanic	54	M	25-May-2010	Collin	Wendy Alba	Rick Perry
459	George Alarick Jones	Black	36	M	02-Jun-2010	Dallas	Forest J. Hall (Note: Also killed Kendra Buckner, but was executed for killing Hall.)	Rick Perry
460	David Lee Powell	White	59	M	15-Jun-2010	Travis	Austin police officer Ralph Allen Ablanedo	Rick Perry
461	Michael James Perry	White	28	M	01-Jul-2010	Montgomery	Sandra Stotler, Adam Stotler, and Jeremy Richardson	Rick Perry
462	Derrick Leon Jackson	Black	42	M	20-Jul-2010	Harris	Forrest Henderson and Alan Wrotenbery	Rick Perry
463	Peter Anthony Cantu	Hispanic	35	M	17-Aug-2010	Harris	Jennifer Lee Ertman and Elizabeth Christine Peña (Note: Also killed Patricia Lopez, but was executed for killing Ertman and Peña.)	Rick Perry
464	Larry Wayne Wooten	Black	51	M	21-Oct-2010	Lamar	Grady Alexander and Bessie Alexander	Rick Perry
2011 – 13 executions								Rick Perry
465	Michael Wayne Hall	White	31	M	15-Feb-2011	Tarrant	Amy Robinson	Rick Perry
466	Timothy Wayne Adams	Black	42	M	22-Feb-2011	Harris	Timothy Wayne Adams Jr.	Rick Perry
467	Cary D. Kerr	White	46	M	03-May-2011	Tarrant	Pamela Horton	Rick Perry
468	Gayland Charles Bradford	Black	42	M	01-Jun-2011	Dallas	Brian Edward Williams	Rick Perry
469	Lee Andrew Taylor	White	32	M	16-Jun-2011	Bowie	Donta Green (Note: Also killed John Hampton, but was executed for killing Green.)	Rick Perry
470	Milton Wuzael Mathis	Black	32	M	21-Jun-2011	Fort Bend	Travis Brown III and Daniel Hibbard	Rick Perry
471	Humberto Leal García Jr.	Hispanic	38	M	07-Jul-2011	Bexar	Adria Sauceda	Rick Perry
472	Mark Anthony Stroman	White	41	M	20-Jul-2011	Dallas	Vasudev Patel (Note: Also killed Waqar Hasan, but was executed for killing Patel.)	Rick Perry
473	Martin Robles	Hispanic	33	M	10-Aug-2011	Nueces	John Commisky and Jesus Omar Gonzalez	Rick Perry
474	Steven Michael Woods Jr.	White	31	M	13-Sep-2011	Denton	Ronald Whitehead and Bethena Brosz	Rick Perry
475	Lawrence Russell Brewer	White	44	M	21-Sep-2011	Brazos (Note: On a change of venue from Jasper.)	James Byrd Jr.	Rick Perry
476	Frank Martinez Garcia Jr.	Hispanic	39	M	27-Oct-2011	Bexar	San Antonio police officer Hector Garza and Jessica Garcia	Rick Perry
477	Guadalupe Esparza	Hispanic	46	M	16-Nov-2011	Bexar	Alyssa Marie Vasquez	Rick Perry
2012 – 15 executions								Rick Perry
478	Rodrigo Hernandez	Hispanic	38	M	26-Jan-2012	Bexar	Susan Verstegen (Note: Also killed Muriel Stoepker in Michigan, but was executed for killing Verstegen.)	Rick Perry
479	George Angel Rivas Jr.	Hispanic	41	M	29-Feb-2012	Dallas	Irving police officer Aubrey Wright Hawkins	Rick Perry
480	Keith Steven Thurmond	White	52	M	07-Mar-2012	Montgomery	Sharon Anne Thurmond and Guy Sean Fernandez	Rick Perry
481	Jesse Joe Hernandez	Hispanic	47	M	28-Mar-2012	Dallas	Karlos Borja	Rick Perry
482	Beunka Adams	Black	29	M	26-Apr-2012	Cherokee	Kenneth Wayne Vandever	Rick Perry
483	Yokamon Laneal Hearn	Black	33	M	18-Jul-2012	Dallas	Frank Meziere	Rick Perry
484	Marvin Lee Wilson	Black	54	M	07-Aug-2012	Jefferson	Jerry Robert Williams	Rick Perry
485	Robert Wayne Harris	Black	40	M	20-Sep-2012	Dallas	6 murder victims (Note: The 6 victims were: Sandra Scott, Dennis Lee, Augustin Villasenor, Rhoda Wheeler, Benjamin Villasenor, and Roberto Jimenez Jr.)	Rick Perry
486	Cleve Foster	White	48	M	25-Sep-2012	Tarrant	Nyanuer Gatluak Pal (Note: Also killed Rachel Urnosky, but was executed for killing Pal.)	Rick Perry
487	Jonathan Marcus Green	Black	44	M	10-Oct-2012	Montgomery	Christina LeAnn Neal	Rick Perry
488	Bobby Lee Hines	White	40	M	24-Oct-2012	Dallas	Michelle Wendy Haupt	Rick Perry
489	Donnie Lee Roberts Jr.	White	41	M	31-Oct-2012	Polk	Vickie Bowen (Note: Also killed Al Crow in Louisiana, but was executed for killing Bowen.)	Rick Perry
490	Mario Rashad Swain	Black	33	M	08-Nov-2012	Gregg	Lola Nixon	Rick Perry
491	Ramon Torres Hernandez	Hispanic	41	M	14-Nov-2012	Bexar	Rosa Maria Rosada (Note: Also killed Sarah Beth Gonzales and Priscilla Almares, but was executed for killing Rosada.)	Rick Perry
492	Preston Craig Hughes III	Black	46	M	15-Nov-2012	Harris	Marcell Taylor and LaSandra Charles	Rick Perry
2013 – 16 executions								Rick Perry
493	Carl Henry Blue	Black	48	M	21-Feb-2013	Brazos	Carmen Richards-Sanders	Rick Perry
494	Rickey Lynn Lewis	Black	50	M	09-Apr-2013	Smith	George Ray Newman	Rick Perry
495	Ronnie Paul Threadgill	Black	40	M	16-Apr-2013	Navarro	Dexter McDonald	Rick Perry
496	Richard Aaron Cobb	White	29	M	25-Apr-2013	Cherokee	Kenneth Wayne Vandever	Rick Perry
497	Carroll Joe Parr	Black	35	M	07-May-2013	McLennan	Joel Dominguez	Rick Perry
498	Jeffrey Demond Williams	Black	37	M	15-May-2013	Harris	Houston police officer Troy Alan Blando	Rick Perry
499	Elroy Chester	Black	43	M	12-Jun-2013	Jefferson	5 murder victims (Note: The 5 victims were: John Henry Sepeda, Etta Mae Stallings, Cheryl DeLeon, Albert Bolden Jr., and Willie Ryman III.)	Rick Perry
500	Kimberly LaGayle McCarthy	Black	52	F	26-Jun-2013	Dallas	Dorothy Booth (Note: Also killed Maggie Harding and Jettie Lucas, but was executed for killing Booth.)	Rick Perry
501	John Manuel Quintanilla Jr.	Hispanic	36	M	16-Jul-2013	Victoria	Victor Billings	Rick Perry
502	Vaughn Ross	Black	41	M	18-Jul-2013	Lubbock	Douglas Birdsall and Viola Ross McVade	Rick Perry
503	Douglas Alan Feldman	White	55	M	31-Jul-2013	Dallas	Robert Stephen Everett and Nicholas Velasquez	Rick Perry
504	Robert Gene Garza	Hispanic	30	M	19-Sep-2013	Hidalgo	4 murder victims (Note: The 4 victims were: Maria De La Luz Bazaldua Cobarrubias, Danitzene Lizeth Vasquez Beltran, Celina Linares Sanchez, and Lourdes Yesenia Araujo Torres.)	Rick Perry
505	Arturo Eleazar Diaz	Hispanic	37	M	26-Sep-2013	Hidalgo	Michael Ryan Nichols	Rick Perry
506	Michael John Yowell	White	43	M	09-Oct-2013	Lubbock	John Yowell, Carol Yowell, and Viola Davis	Rick Perry
507	Jamie Bruce McCoskey	White	49	M	12-Nov-2013	Harris	Michael Keith Dwyer	Rick Perry
508	Jerry Duane Martin	White	43	M	03-Dec-2013	Leon	TDCJ corrections officer Susan Louise Canfield	Rick Perry
2014 – 10 executions								Rick Perry
509	Edgar Tamayo Arias	Hispanic	46	M	22-Jan-2014	Harris	Houston police officer Guy Patrick Gaddis	Rick Perry
510	Suzanne Margaret Basso	White	59	F	05-Feb-2014	Harris	Louis Charles Musso	Rick Perry
511	Ray L. Jasper III	Black	33	M	19-Mar-2014	Bexar	David Mendoza Alejandro	Rick Perry
512	Anthony Dewayne Doyle	Black	29	M	27-Mar-2014	Dallas	Hyun Mi Cho	Rick Perry
513	Tommy Lynn Sells	White	49	M	03-Apr-2014	Val Verde	Kaylene Jo Harris (Note: Also killed Mary Beatrice Perez, but was executed for killing Harris. Further conclusively linked to at least 20 other murders.)	Rick Perry
514	Ramiro Hernández-Llanas	Hispanic	44	M	09-Apr-2014	Kerr	Glen Ernst Lich	Rick Perry
515	Jose Luis Villegas Jr.	Hispanic	39	M	16-Apr-2014	Nueces	Alma Perez, Erida Perez Salazar, and Jacob Salazar	Rick Perry
516	Willie Tyrone Trottie	Black	45	M	10-Sep-2014	Harris	Barbara Nell Canada, and Titus C. Canada	Rick Perry
517	Lisa Ann Coleman	Black	38	F	17-Sep-2014	Tarrant	Davontae Williams	Rick Perry
518	Miguel Angel Paredes	Hispanic	32	M	28-Oct-2014	Bexar	Adrian Torres, Nelly Bravo, and Shawn Michael Cain	Rick Perry
2015 – 13 executions
519	Arnold Prieto Jr.	Hispanic	41	M	21-Jan-2015	Bexar	Rodolfo Rodriguez, Virginia Rodriguez, and Paula Moran	Greg Abbott
520	Robert Charles Ladd	Black	57	M	29-Jan-2015	Smith	4 murder victims (Note: The 4 victims were: Vivian Geanett Thompson, Maurice Thompson, Latoya Thompson, and Vicki Ann Garner.)	Greg Abbott
521	Donald Keith Newbury	White	52	M	04-Feb-2015	Dallas	Irving police officer Aubrey Wright Hawkins	Greg Abbott
522	Manuel Vasquez	Hispanic	46	M	11-Mar-2015	Bexar	Juanita Ybarra	Greg Abbott
523	Kent William Sprouse	White	42	M	09-Apr-2015	Ellis	Ferris police officer Harry Marvin Steinfeldt III and Pedro Moreno	Greg Abbott
524	Manuel Fernando Garza Jr.	Hispanic	34	M	15-Apr-2015	Bexar	San Antonio police officer John Anthony Riojas	Greg Abbott
525	Derrick Dewayne Charles	Black	32	M	12-May-2015	Harris	Brenda Bennett, Obie Lee Bennett, and Myiesha Bennett	Greg Abbott
526	Lester Leroy Bower Jr.	White	67	M	03-Jun-2015	Grayson	4 murder victims (Note: The 4 victims were: Bob Tate, Philip Good, Jerry Brown, and Ronald Mayes.)	Greg Abbott
527	Gregory Lynn Russeau	Black	45	M	18-Jun-2015	Smith	James Syvertson	Greg Abbott
528	Daniel Lee Lopez	Hispanic	27	M	12-Aug-2015	Nueces	Corpus Christi police officer Stuart Jay Alexander	Greg Abbott
529	Juan Martín García	Hispanic	35	M	06-Oct-2015	Harris	Hugo Solano	Greg Abbott
530	Licho Escamilla	Hispanic	33	M	14-Oct-2015	Dallas	Dallas police officer Christopher Kevin James (Note: Also killed Santos Gauna, but was executed for killing James.)	Greg Abbott
531	Raphael Deon Holiday	Black	36	M	18-Nov-2015	Madison	Tierra Lynch, Jasmine DuPaul, and Justice Holiday	Greg Abbott
2016 – 7 executions								Greg Abbott
532	Richard Allen Masterson	White	43	M	20-Jan-2016	Harris	Darin Shane Honeycutt	Greg Abbott
533	James Garrett Freeman	White	35	M	27-Jan-2016	Wharton	TPWD Game Warden Justin Hurst	Greg Abbott
534	Gustavo Julian Garcia Jr.	Hispanic	43	M	16-Feb-2016	Collin	Craig Alfonso Turski (Note: Also killed Gregory Jorge Martin, but was executed for killing Turski.)	Greg Abbott
535	Coy Wayne Wesbrook	White	58	M	09-Mar-2016	Harris	5 murder victims (Note: The 5 victims were: Gloria Jean Coons, Diana Ruth Money, Antonio Cruz, Anthony Ray Rogers, and Kelly Hazlip.)	Greg Abbott
536	Adam Kelly Ward	White	33	M	22-Mar-2016	Hunt	Commerce Code Enforcement Officer Michael Walker	Greg Abbott
537	Pablo Lucio Vasquez	Hispanic	38	M	06-Apr-2016	Hidalgo	David Cardenas	Greg Abbott
538	Barney Ronald Fuller Jr.	White	58	M	05-Oct-2016	Houston	Nathan Copeland and Annette Copeland	Greg Abbott
2017 – 7 executions								Greg Abbott
539	Christopher Chubasco Wilkins	White	48	M	11-Jan-2017	Tarrant	Willie Ladell Freeman and Mike Silva (Note: Also killed Gilbert Vallejo, but was executed for killing Freeman and Silva.)	Greg Abbott
540	Terry Darnell Edwards	Black	43	M	26-Jan-2017	Dallas	Mickell Goodwin and Tommy Walker	Greg Abbott
541	Rolando Ruiz Jr.	Hispanic	44	M	07-Mar-2017	Bexar	Theresa Rodriguez	Greg Abbott
542	James Eugene Bigby	White	61	M	14-Mar-2017	Tarrant	4 murder victims (Note: The 4 victims were: Michael Trekell, Jayson Kehler, Wesley Crane, and Frank Johnson.)	Greg Abbott
543	TaiChin Preyor	Black	46	M	27-Jul-2017	Bexar	Jami Tackett	Greg Abbott
544	Robert Lynn Pruett	White	38	M	12-Oct-2017	Bee	TDCJ corrections officer Daniel James Nagle (Note: Also killed Ray Yarborough, but was executed for killing Nagle.)	Greg Abbott
545	Rubén Douglas Cárdenas Ramírez	Hispanic	47	M	08-Nov-2017	Hidalgo	Mayra Laguna	Greg Abbott
2018 – 13 executions								Greg Abbott
546	Anthony Allen Shore	White	55	M	18-Jan-2018	Harris	4 murder victims (Note: The 4 victims were: Laurie Lee Tremblay, Maria del Carmen Estrada, Diana Rebollar, and Dana Sanchez.)	Greg Abbott
547	William Earl Rayford	Black	64	M	30-Jan-2018	Dallas	Carol Lynn Thomas Hall (Note: Also killed Gail Rayford, but was executed for killing Hall.)	Greg Abbott
548	John David Battaglia Jr.	White	62	M	01-Feb-2018	Dallas	Mary Faith Battaglia and Liberty Mae Battaglia	Greg Abbott
549	Rosendo Rodriguez III	Hispanic	38	M	27-Mar-2018	Lubbock	Summer Lee Baldwin (Note: Also killed Joanna Kathryn Rogers, but was executed for killing Baldwin.)	Greg Abbott
550	Erick Daniel Davila	Black	31	M	25-Apr-2018	Tarrant	Annette Stevenson and Queshawn Stevenson	Greg Abbott
551	Juan Edward Castillo	Hispanic	37	M	16-May-2018	Bexar	Tommy Garcia Jr.	Greg Abbott
552	Danny Paul Bible	White	66	M	27-Jun-2018	Harris	4 murder victims (Note: The 4 victims were: Inez Deaton, Pamela Kay Hudgins, Tracy Zan Powers, and Justin Powers.)	Greg Abbott
553	Christopher Anthony Young	Black	34	M	17-Jul-2018	Bexar	Hasmukhbhai Patel	Greg Abbott
554	Troy James Clark	White	51	M	26-Sep-2018	Smith	Christina Muse	Greg Abbott
555	Daniel Clate Acker	White	46	M	27-Sep-2018	Hopkins	Marquetta George	Greg Abbott
556	Robert Moreno Ramos	Hispanic	64	M	14-Nov-2018	Hidalgo	Leticia Ramos, Abigail Ramos, and Jonathon Ramos	Greg Abbott
557	Joseph Christopher Garcia	Hispanic	47	M	04-Dec-2018	Dallas	Irving police officer Aubrey Wright Hawkins (Note: Also killed Miguel Luna, but was executed for killing Hawkins.)	Greg Abbott
558	Alvin Avon Braziel Jr.	Black	43	M	11-Dec-2018	Dallas	Douglas White	Greg Abbott
2019 – 9 executions								Greg Abbott
559	Robert Mitchell Jennings	Black	61	M	30-Jan-2019	Harris	Houston police officer Elston Morris Howard	Greg Abbott
560	Billie Wayne Coble	White	70	M	28-Feb-2019	McLennan	Robert Joseph Vicha, Zelda Walling Vicha, and John Robert Vicha	Greg Abbott
561	John William King	White	44	M	24-Apr-2019	Jasper	James Byrd Jr.	Greg Abbott
562	Larry Ray Swearingen	White	48	M	21-Aug-2019	Montgomery	Melissa Trotter	Greg Abbott
563	Billy Jack Crutsinger	White	64	M	04-Sep-2019	Tarrant	Pearl Magourik and Patricia Syren	Greg Abbott
564	Mark Anthony Soliz	Hispanic	37	M	10-Sep-2019	Johnson	Nancy Weatherly (Note: Also killed Ruben Martinez, but was executed for killing Weatherly.)	Greg Abbott
565	Robert Sparks	Black	45	M	25-Sep-2019	Dallas	Chare Agnew, Raekwon Agnew, and Harold Sublet Jr.	Greg Abbott
566	Justen Grant Hall	White	38	M	06-Nov-2019	El Paso	Melanie Ruth Billhartz (Note: Also killed Arlene Diaz, but was executed for killing Billhartz.)	Greg Abbott
567	Travis Trevino Runnels	Black	46	M	11-Dec-2019	Potter	TDCJ Supervisor Stanley Wiley	Greg Abbott
Source: List of executed offenders by the TDCJ since 1982.

Preceded by List of people executed in Texas, 2000–2009	Lists of people executed in Texas	Succeeded by List of people executed in Texas, 2020–present
