= Kelly Gissendaner =

American criminal (1968–2015)

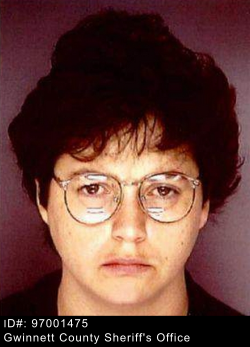
- Born: Kelly Renée Brookshire; March 8, 1968; Lawrenceville, Georgia, U.S.
- Died: September 30, 2015 (aged 47); Georgia Diagnostic and Classification Prison near Jackson, Georgia, U.S.
- Spouse(s): Jeff Banks (m. 1987; div. 1987); Douglas Gissendaner (m. 1989; div. 1993) (m. 1995; died 1997)
- Status: Executed by lethal injection
- Motive: To be with another man, monetary gain
- Convictions: Malice murder (November 18, 1998)
- Penalty: Death (November 20, 1998)
- Accomplice: Gregory Owen (1997)

Details
- Victims: Douglas Gissendaner
- Date: February 7, 1997 c. 11:30 p.m.
- Country: United States
- State: Georgia
- Location: Gwinnett County
- Date apprehended: February 25, 1997
- Imprisoned at: Arrendale State Prison

Kelly Renée Gissendaner (née Brookshire; March 8, 1968 – September 30, 2015) was an American woman who was executed in Georgia, United States. Gissendaner had been convicted of orchestrating the murder of her husband, Douglas Gissendaner (December 14, 1966 – February 7, 1997). At the time of the murder, Gissendaner was 28, and her husband was 30. After her conviction, and until her execution, Gissendaner was the only woman on death row in Georgia.

== Early life and family ==
Kelly Renée Brookshire was born on March 8, 1968 into a poor cotton-farming family in Georgia. Her parents divorced when she was a child and her mother soon married again. In sworn affidavits, family members and friends attested that she had been molested by her stepfather as well as by other men during her childhood and adolescence. During her senior year of high school, she reported being date raped. Her first son was born weeks after her graduation from high school. In 1987, at the age of 19, Kelly married her first husband Jeff Banks. They divorced six months later.

On September 2, 1989 Kelly married Douglas Gissendaner. Soon after, they both lost their jobs, and moved in with Kelly's mother. With Kelly pregnant, Douglas joined the Army. In 1990, shortly after their daughter was born, the family moved to Wiesbaden, Germany where Douglas was now stationed. He was away from the home frequently due to his active service obligations. By 1991, the couple filed for legal separation and Kelly enlisted into the Army. Their divorce was finalized in 1993.

During her brief military service, Kelly became pregnant by a fellow soldier who later died of cancer. Their son was born after his death. Kelly was now the mother of two sons and a daughter. In 1994 Kelly and Douglas rekindled their relationship and remarried in May 1995.

In December 1996, the couple bought a house together in Auburn, Georgia.

== Crime ==
=== Murder of Douglas Gissendaner ===
On February 7, 1997, Gregory Bruce Owen (born March 17, 1971) hid near the couple's home in Auburn. When Douglas arrived, Owen forced Douglas into his car at knifepoint and drove him to a wooded area in Gwinnett County near Harbins Park. After striking Douglas in the head with a nightstick, Owen stabbed Douglas in the neck and back multiple times. When Kelly arrived at the scene moments later, the two set fire to her husband's car and hid the body in the woods.

=== Trial ===
Before trial, prosecutors offered both Owen and Gissendaner a chance to accept responsibility for the murder and plead guilty and then receive a sentence of life in prison with no chance of parole for 25 years. Owen accepted the offer while Gissendaner rejected it and went on trial.

Gissendaner was convicted of orchestrating her husband's murder and sentenced to death in 1998 after Owen testified against her in a plea agreement in which he was sentenced to life imprisonment with the possibility of parole after 25 years. Owen told a jury that Gissendaner had first approached him about "a way to get rid of" her husband three months before the murder. He had suggested that Gissendaner just get a divorce instead, but she refused, believing that murder was the only way to get Douglas out of her life and still get the house and a payoff from his life insurance policy. During the trial, Gissendaner was discovered to have threatened witnesses and also plotted to pay a witness to commit perjury.

== Prison ==
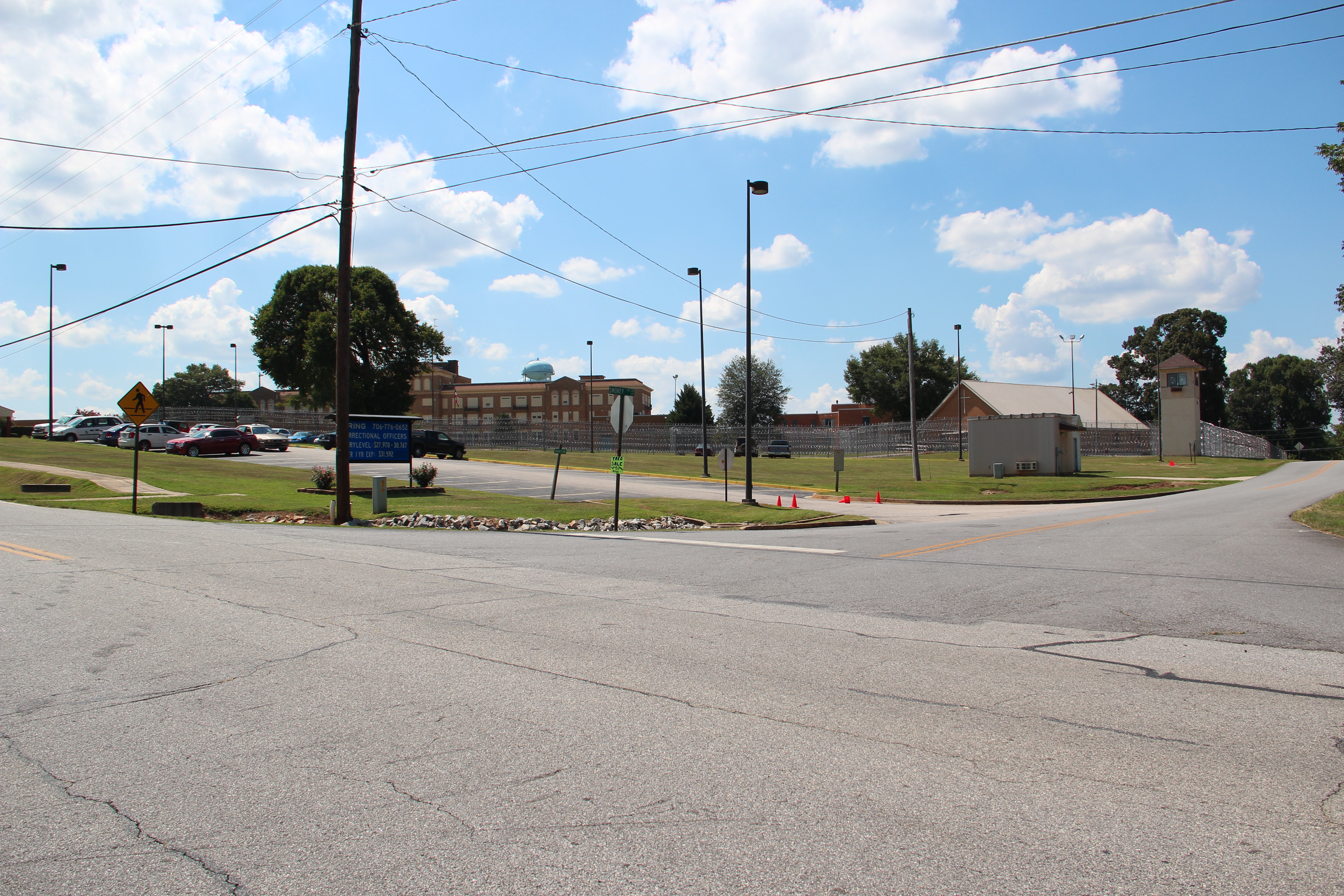
Arrendale State Prison, where she was held

=== Ministry ===
After being sentenced to death, Gissendaner was imprisoned at Metro State Prison until it was closed in 2011. She was then transferred to Arrendale State Prison. While in prison, Gissendaner had a conversion to Christianity. During her time in prison, Gissendaner ministered to other women living in prison with her.

A group of women who were incarcerated with Gissendaner formed a group called the "Struggle Sisters" after they were released from prison. Gissendaner had spoken to the women through an air vent and prevented some from committing suicide, while other women tell of how Gissendaner's words encouraged them to turn their lives around. The women released a video detailing the impact Gissendaner had on their lives.

=== Theology studies ===
In 2010, Gissendaner enrolled in a theology studies program for prisoners, run by a consortium of Atlanta-area divinity schools, including the divinity school at Emory University.

During theology studies, she became a student of Christian thinkers like Dietrich Bonhoeffer and Rowan Williams. Gissendaner developed a friendship with Jürgen Moltmann while she was in prison. Gissendaner sent Moltmann a paper which she had written on Bonhoeffer. He was impressed with her paper, and he wrote back. After that, the two became penpals exchanging letters about theology and faith. Gissendaner completed a theological degree program through Emory University.

== Execution ==
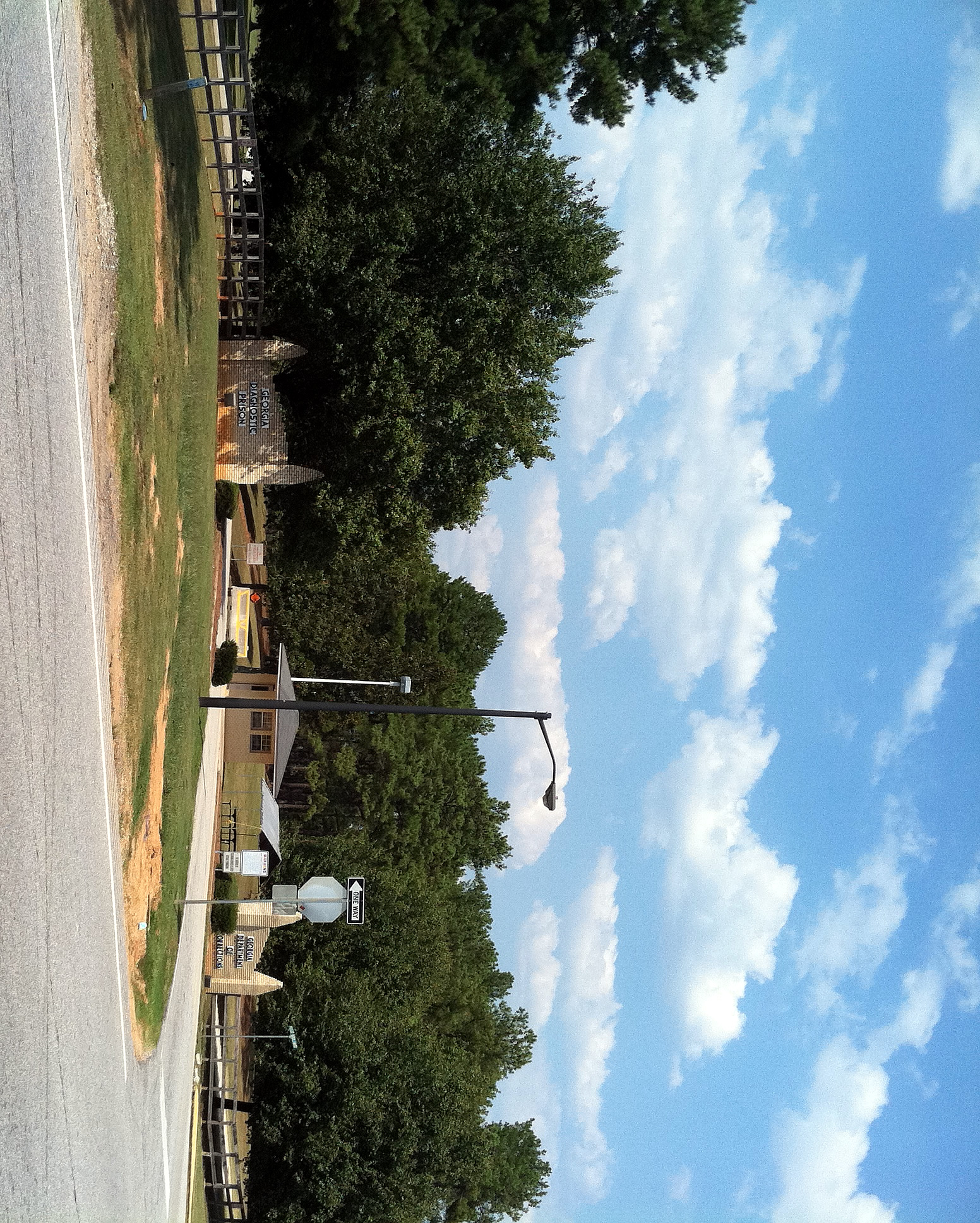
Georgia Diagnostic and Classification State Prison, the execution site

Gissendaner's execution was scheduled for February 25, 2015, when a winter storm delayed it until March 2, 2015. Her execution was further delayed when one of the execution drugs (pentobarbital) was thought to have been spoiled through improper storage, though it was later determined that the drug had merely precipitated out of solution due to colder than recommended storage conditions.

Archbishop Carlo Maria Viganò, on behalf of Pope Francis, urged the Georgia State Board of Pardons and Paroles to spare Gissendaner's life. Gissendaner's clemency application to the Board of Pardons included support from a number of correctional officers whom she had met while in prison. Norman S. Fletcher, the former Chief Justice of the Supreme Court of Georgia, urged clemency because capital punishment was not proportional to her crime. The Georgia Republican Party's general counsel and Republican Bob Barr also supported clemency.

The board again declined to commute her sentence on September 29, 2015. (Georgia is one of three US states in which the governor is not empowered to grant clemency to the condemned.)

Gissendaner was scheduled to be executed on September 29, 2015, but was again delayed by appeals. She was executed by lethal injection at the Georgia Diagnostic and Classification Prison in Jackson, Georgia, on September 30 at 12:21 a.m.

Her last meal was cheese dip with chips, Texas nacho with fajitas meat and a diet-frosted lemonade. Gissendaner cried, prayed, sang "Amazing Grace", and said, "...and I love you Sally. And I love you Susan. You let my kids know I went out singing Amazing Grace. And tell the Gissendaner family I am so sorry. That amazing man lost his life because of me and if I could take it back, if this would change it, I would have done it a long time ago. But it's not. And I just hope they can find peace. And I hope they find some happiness. God bless you."

She was the first woman executed in Georgia since Lena Baker in 1945, as well as the only woman executed in the United States in 2015.

== See also ==
- Capital punishment in Georgia (U.S. state)
- List of people executed in Georgia (U.S. state)
- List of people executed in the United States in 2015
- List of women executed in the United States since 1976

Executions carried out in Georgia
Preceded by Warren Hill January 27, 2015	Kelly Gissendaner; September 30, 2015	Succeeded by Marcus Ray Johnson November 19, 2015
Executions carried out in the United States
Preceded by Roderick Nunley – Missouri September 1, 2015	Kelly Gissendaner – Georgia; September 30, 2015	Succeeded by Alfredo Prieto – Virginia October 1, 2015
Women executed in the United States
Preceded by Lisa Ann Coleman – Texas September 17, 2014	Kelly Gissendaner – Georgia; September 30, 2015	Succeeded by Lisa Montgomery – Federal government January 13, 2021
