= List of people executed in the United States in 2015 =

Twenty-eight people, twenty-seven male and one female, were executed in the United States in 2015, all by lethal injection. One person, Alfredo Rolando Prieto, was a foreign national from El Salvador.

== List of people executed in the United States in 2015 ==
No.	Date of execution	Name	Age of person			Gender	Ethnicity	State	Method	Ref.
No.	Date of execution	Name	At execution	At offense	Age difference	Gender	Ethnicity	State	Method	Ref.
1	January 13, 2015	Andrew Howard Brannan	66	49	17	Male	White	Georgia	Lethal injection	
2	January 15, 2015	Charles Frederick Warner	47	30	17	Male	Black	Oklahoma	Lethal injection	
3	January 15, 2015	Johnny Shane Kormondy	42	21	21	Male	White	Florida	Lethal injection	
4	January 21, 2015	Arnold Prieto Jr.	41	20	21	Male	Hispanic	Texas	Lethal injection	
5	January 27, 2015	Warren Lee Hill Jr.	54	30	24	Male	Black	Georgia	Lethal injection	
6	January 29, 2015	Robert Charles Ladd	57	39	18	Male	Black	Texas	Lethal injection	
7	February 4, 2015	Donald Keith Newbury	52	38	14	Male	White	Texas	Lethal injection	
8	February 11, 2015	Walter Timothy Storey	47	22	25	Male	White	Missouri	Lethal injection	
9	March 11, 2015	Manuel Vasquez	46	29	17	Male	Hispanic	Texas	Lethal injection	
10	March 17, 2015	Cecil Lee Clayton	74	56	18	Male	White	Missouri	Lethal injection	
11	April 9, 2015	Kent William Sprouse	42	30	12	Male	White	Texas	Lethal injection	
12	April 14, 2015	Andre Vincent Cole	52	35	17	Male	Black	Missouri	Lethal injection	
13	April 15, 2015	Manuel Fernando Garza Jr.	34	20	14	Male	Hispanic	Texas	Lethal injection	
14	May 12, 2015	Derrick Dewayne Charles	32	19	13	Male	Black	Texas	Lethal injection	
15	June 3, 2015	Lester Leroy Bower Jr.	67	35	32	Male	White	Texas	Lethal injection	
16	June 9, 2015	Richard Lamont Strong	48	33	15	Male	Black	Missouri	Lethal injection	
17	June 18, 2015	Gregory Lynn Russeau	45	31	14	Male	Black	Texas	Lethal injection	
18	July 14, 2015	David Stanley Zink	55	41	14	Male	White	Missouri	Lethal injection	
19	August 12, 2015	Daniel Lee Lopez	27	21	6	Male	Hispanic	Texas	Lethal injection	
20	September 1, 2015	Roderick Nunley	50	24	26	Male	Black	Missouri	Lethal injection	
21	September 30, 2015	Kelly Renee Gissendaner	47	28	19	Female	White	Georgia	Lethal injection	
22	October 1, 2015	Alfredo Rolando Prieto	49	23	26	Male	Hispanic	Virginia	Lethal injection	
23	October 6, 2015	Juan Martin Garcia	35	18	17	Male	Hispanic	Texas	Lethal injection	
24	October 14, 2015	Licho Escamilla	33	19	14	Male	Hispanic	Texas	Lethal injection	
25	October 29, 2015	Jerry William Correll	59	29	30	Male	White	Florida	Lethal injection	
26	November 18, 2015	Raphael Deon Holiday	36	21	15	Male	Black	Texas	Lethal injection	
27	November 19, 2015	Marcus Ray Johnson	50	28	22	Male	White	Georgia	Lethal injection	
28	December 9, 2015	Brian Keith Terrell	47	24	23	Male	Black	Georgia	Lethal injection	
		Average:	48 years	29 years	19 years					

== Demographics ==
Gender
Male	27	96%
Female	1	4%
Ethnicity
White	11	39%
Black	10	36%
Hispanic	7	25%
State
Texas	13	46%
Missouri	6	21%
Georgia	5	18%
Florida	2	7%
Oklahoma	1	4%
Virginia	1	4%
Method
Lethal injection	28	100%
Month
January	6	21%
February	2	7%
March	2	7%
April	3	11%
May	1	4%
June	3	11%
July	1	4%
August	1	4%
September	2	7%
October	4	14%
November	2	7%
December	1	4%
Age
20–29	1	4%
30–39	5	18%
40–49	11	39%
50–59	8	29%
60–69	2	7%
70–79	1	4%
Total	28	100%

== Executions in recent years ==
Number of executions
2016	20
2015	28
2014	35
Total	83

== See also ==
- List of death row inmates in the United States
- List of juveniles executed in the United States since 1976
- List of most recent executions by jurisdiction
- List of people scheduled to be executed in the United States
- List of women executed in the United States since 1976

Preceded by 2014	List of people executed in the United States in 2015	Succeeded by 2016
