= Harry Mitts Jr. =

American convicted double killer (1952–2013)

Harry D. Mitts Jr.
- Mugshot of Harry Mitts Jr.
- Born: June 18, 1952; Ohio, U.S.
- Died: September 25, 2013 (aged 61); Southern Ohio Correctional Facility, Ohio, U.S.
- Status: Executed by lethal injection
- Motive: Racial hate against African Americans (Bryant); Alleged wish to be killed by the police (Glivar)
- Convictions: Aggravated murder (2 counts); Attempted murder (2 counts)
- Penalty: Death

Details
- Date: August 14, 1994
- Location: Garfield Heights, Ohio
- Killed: John Bryant, 28; Dennis Glivar, 40
- Injured: Thomas Kaiser, 38; John Mackey, 38
- Imprisoned at: Southern Ohio Correctional Facility

Harry D. Mitts Jr. (June 18, 1952 – September 25, 2013) was an American convicted murderer who was executed in Ohio for the racially motivated murder of his neighbor's African-American boyfriend, John Bryant, in Garfield Heights, Ohio in August 1994. Shortly after the fatal shooting of Bryant, Mitts engaged in a gunfight with several police officers, which resulted in the death of Sergeant Dennis Glivar. Another two police officers were wounded in the shootout before Mitts was apprehended. In November 1994, Mitts was found guilty of the double murder and sentenced to death. 19 years after the murders, Mitts was put to death by lethal injection on September 25, 2013. As of 2026, Mitts remains the last white defendant to be executed for murdering an African-American victim in Ohio.

== Background ==
Harry D. Mitts Jr. was born on June 18, 1952, in Ohio. He had several brothers and sisters.

Mitts attended the Garfield Heights High School in 1970 and also studied photojournalism in college for 1 1/2 years. After reaching adulthood, Mitts was married with one daughter at one point in time before his marriage ended with a divorce, and his ex-wife remarried to a police officer and gained custody of Mitts's daughter.

== 1994 Garfield Heights murders ==
On August 14, 1994, after an argument at home with his former wife, 42-year-old Harry Mitts Jr. went on a six-hour shooting spree in his neighborhood in Garfield Heights, Ohio, which resulted in the murders of two people: 28-year-old John Bryant, who was African-American, and 40-year-old Sergeant Dennis Glivar, who was a white police officer in the Garfield Heights Police Department.

According to media and court sources, on that day itself, Mitts had shouted some racist slurs towards Bryant, who was the African-American boyfriend of his white neighbor, and fired his gun at point blank range at Bryant while the couple were returning from a grocery shopping trip. According to Timothy "Tim" Roane, he was helping his brother-in-law move furniture into the apartment when the shooting happened and witnessed Bryant being shot. Although Mitts warned other neighbors to not help Bryant, Roane disregarded the warning and managed to bring the wounded Bryant back to the apartment with the help of his brother-in-law. However, Bryant died at the scene from a single gunshot wound to the chest.

Subsequently, after the fatal shooting of Bryant, the police responded to the scene and tried to arrest Mitts. At the time of the police's arrival, Mitts had barricaded himself inside the apartment building. Two police officers of the Garfield Heights Police Department – 38-year-old Lieutenant Thomas Kaiser and 40-year-old Sergeant Dennis Glivar – approached the building in order to negotiate for Mitts to surrender. However, when both Sergeant Glivar and Lieutenant Kaiser got closer, Mitts barged out of the door, and with a gun in each hand (one of them a .44 Magnum and another a 9mm pistol), he fired multiple shots at both Lieutenant Kaiser and Sergeant Glivar. While Lieutenant Kaiser was able to take cover despite being wounded in the chest, Sergeant Glivar died at the scene after sustaining seven gunshot wounds to his body, which went through his heart, lung, liver, kidney, and stomach.

After taking cover, Lieutenant Kaiser attempted to persuade Mitts to surrender, but Mitts refused to and reportedly stated that the only way to end this was that he be killed by the police. Subsequently, a third police officer, 38-year-old Officer John Mackey of the Maple Heights Police Department, arrived at the scene, and he assisted Lieutenant Kaiser in evacuating tenants upstairs by guiding them to a ladder at the back window. Subsequently, both Officer Mackey and Lieutenant Kaiser went to the building to corner Mitts, who engaged in another shootout with the two officers, and he also wounded Officer Mackey.

A few hours after the gunfight, police reinforcements arrived at the building, and Mitts, who was wounded during the shooting, surrendered after the police fired tear gas into the barricaded apartment building. Mitts was then arrested for the murders of Bryant and Sergeant Glivar and the attempted murders of Lieutenant Kaiser and Officer Mackey. Mitts was later hospitalized for his injuries at the MetroHealth Medical Center. Both Lieutenant Kaiser and Officer Mackey sought treatment and eventually recovered.

In light of the murders, the state senators of Ohio called for harsher laws to introduce harsher penalties for cases of police officers murdered in the line of duty.

== Murder trial ==
After his arrest, Harry Mitts Jr. was charged with two counts of aggravated murder and two counts of attempted murder. For the most serious charge of aggravated murder, Mitts potentially faced the death penalty under Ohio state law.

A Cuyahoga County grand jury indicted Mitts for all four charges on August 25, 1994. A pre-trial hearing was granted the same month when Mitts was indicted, so as to determine whether he was mentally competent to stand trial. It was concluded on September 21, 1994, that Mitts was fit to plead and go on trial for the murders of Sergeant Dennis Glivar and John Bryant.

Mitts stood trial before a jury on October 24, 1994. During the trial, Mitts submitted a plea of not guilty by reason of insanity. His defense mainly constituted that he was suffering from alcohol intoxication at the time of the shootings and that his mental state was therefore impaired when he committed the double murder.

On November 3, 1994, the jury returned with their verdict, unanimously finding Mitts guilty of all charges and he was convicted accordingly. On November 15, 1994, the same jury recommended the death penalty for both counts of murdering Bryant and Glivar.

On November 21, 1994, Mitts was formally sentenced to death by Judge William Aurelius. Mitts also received consecutive jail terms of ten to 25 years for the two counts of attempted murder, in addition to three years imprisonment for felony with a firearm. Mitts was admitted to the Ohio Department of Rehabilitation and Correction on December 6, 1994, and incarcerated on death row at the Southern Ohio Correctional Facility.

== Appeals ==
After he was sentenced to death, Harry Mitts Jr. went on to appeal against his two death sentences for the next 19 years.

On March 11, 1998, the Ohio Supreme Court rejected an appeal from Mitts.

On September 28, 2000, the Ohio 8th District Court of Appeals in Cuyahoga County rejected Mitts's appeal.

On May 10, 2002, the Ohio 8th District Court of Appeals dismissed Mitts's second appeal.

The Ohio Supreme Court dismissed Mitts's second appeal against his death sentence on March 19, 2003.

On September 29, 2005, District Judge Dan Aaron Polster of the U.S. District Court for the Northern District of Ohio turned down Mitts's appeal for a review of his case.

On September 8, 2010, after hearing Mitts's appeal, the 6th Circuit Court of Appeals determined that the death sentences of Mitts should be overturned after they found that the jurors of Mitts's original trial were improperly instructed to first consider the death penalty and rule out the possibilities of a prison sentence for Mitts before moving on to determine a potential jail term for Mitts with respect to the murder charges, which "deprived the jury of a meaningful opportunity to consider" between a death sentence or life imprisonment.

The decision of the 6th Circuit Court of Appeals was opposed by the Ohio state lawyers, who appealed to the U.S. Supreme Court to reverse the decision. The U.S. Supreme Court reviewed the ruling and on May 2, 2011, the court revoked the decision of the 6th Circuit Court of Appeals and reinstated the death penalty in Mitts's case, stating that these instructions made to the jury back in 1994 during Mitts's murder trial were not a breach of his constitutional rights to a fair trial and the U.S. Supreme Court had heard similar grounds of appeal in another case, where they found such jury instructions were not unconstitutional. This decision enabled Mitts to be eligible for execution on a date to be decided, and the Cuyahoga County Prosecutor Bill Mason expressed his intention to seek a death warrant from the Ohio Supreme Court to facilitate his execution.

== Execution ==
Two years after the U.S. Supreme Court finalized his death sentence, Harry Mitts Jr. received his death warrant. His execution was scheduled to be carried out on September 25, 2013. Mitts was set to be the 26th person executed in the United States as well as the third person from Ohio to face execution during the year 2013.

Before his scheduled execution, Mitts was granted a formal clemency hearing before the Ohio Parole Board, and if his petition for clemency was approved, his death sentence would be commuted to life in prison without the possibility of parole. During a hearing conducted on August 19, 2013, Mitts pleaded for leniency on the basis that he found God in prison and was willing to take responsibility for his actions. Mitts also stated that the shootings were not racially motivated and his alcohol intoxication and distress over his divorce were also raised during the clemency hearing, and he added he was unable to explain why he did not shoot Bryant's white girlfriend or any other white bystanders. Overall, Mitts stated that he regretted killing both Bryant and Glivar out of distress over his recent divorce.

The state parole board, in the end, unanimously rejected the clemency petition on August 27, 2013, stating that Mitts had murdered Bryant in cold blood just because he was African-American and additionally killed a police officer soon after, which demonstrated his blatant disregard for the lives of both innocent bystanders and law enforcement officers, and the circumstances of the case were such that it was the "worst of the worst" death penalty cases.

The state governor John Kasich similarly declined to grant clemency based on the parole board's unanimous recommendation to refuse clemency for Mitts, who was subsequently moved to the death house a few days before his impending execution to be placed under maximum surveillance up until the commencement of his execution procedure. It was also reported during the final days before Mitts's execution that Mitts received a Bible from the widow and sister of the late Sergeant Dennis Glivar.

On September 25, 2013, 61-year-old Harry Mitts Jr. was put to death by lethal injection at the Southern Ohio Correctional Facility. About 35 minutes after he was administered with a single dose of pentobarbital, Mitts was pronounced dead at 10.39 a.m. In his final statement, Mitts apologized and asked for forgiveness for his actions.

In response to the execution of Mitts, John Bryant's sister, Johnnal, told the press that she found it hard to forgive Mitts for murdering her brother just because of his skin color. Similarly, Glivar's widow, Debbie, said she would never forgive Mitts for killing her husband. Glivar's mother, Helen, told the press about her feelings towards the death of her son's killer, "It is finished." Lieutenant Thomas Kaiser, who was retired at this point and also came to witness Mitts's execution, stated that the death of Mitts did little to make up for the damage caused, and said that justice should not have taken 19 years to be served in such cases where there was no judicial error from the start.

According to sources, Mitts was the last person to be executed using the drug pentobarbital during a lethal injection execution in Ohio, and the drug itself was also the last dose available in Ohio since the state's drug supply of pentobarbital was set to expire soon after Mitts's execution and the pharmaceutical companies refused to sell pentobarbital to retentionist U.S. states for the purpose of lethal injection executions. As a result, Ohio authorities came up with solutions to replace pentobarbital and its lethal injection protocols with new drugs and protocols to help facilitate their scheduled lethal injection executions that were set to occur after the execution of Mitts, and the new method was set to be announced in October 2013. It was also expected that the announcement of new drugs deployed for future executions would attract legal challenges.

Mitts's execution was notable in that it marked a supposedly rare occasion of a white defendant being executed for murdering an African-American victim. According to the Associated Press, in the United States it is unusual for white people to face the death penalty for killing African-American people. However, only one of Mitts's victims (Bryant) was African-American, while the other (Glivar) was white and a police officer.

== See also ==
- Capital punishment in Ohio
- List of people executed in Ohio
- List of people executed in the United States in 2013
- List of white defendants executed for killing a black victim

Executions carried out in Ohio
Preceded by Steven T. Smith May 1, 2013	Harry D. Mitts Jr. September 25, 2013	Succeeded by Dennis B. McGuire January 16, 2014
Executions carried out in the United States
Preceded by Robert Gene Garza – Texas September 19, 2013	Harry D. Mitts Jr. – Ohio; September 25, 2013	Succeeded by Arturo Eleazer Diaz – Texas September 26, 2013
White defendants executed for killing a black victim in the United States
Preceded by Frederick Treesh – Ohio March 6, 2013	Harry D. Mitts Jr. – Ohio; September 25, 2013	Succeeded by Christopher Chubasco Wilkins – Texas January 11, 2017
