= Lester Bower =

American mass murderer (1947–2015)

- Born: Lester Leroy Bower Jr. November 20, 1947; Arlington, Texas, U.S.
- Died: June 3, 2015 (aged 67); Huntsville Unit, Texas, U.S.
- Status: Executed by lethal injection
- Conviction: Capital murder (4 counts)
- Penalty: Death

Lester Leroy Bower Jr. (November 20, 1947 – June 3, 2015) was an American man executed for the 1983 murders of four men in Grayson County, Texas. Bower spent 31 years on death row and received six stays of execution. He was executed at the Texas State Penitentiary, aged 67, becoming the oldest prisoner executed by Texas since 1976, until the execution of 70-year-old Billie Coble in 2019.

== Biography ==
Lester Leroy Bower Jr. was born on November 20, 1947, in Arlington, Texas. A college-educated chemical salesman, Bower was married with two children and had no criminal record prior to his conviction.

== Crime ==
On October 8, 1983, the bodies of four men, Bob Tate, Jerry Brown, Philip Good and Ronald Mayes, were discovered in a Texas airplane hangar, all were shot in the head at close range. Mayes was a former police officer and Good was a sheriff's deputy. Bower was later arrested after pieces of the victim's aircraft were found at his home.

== Trial ==
At Bower's trial, prosecutors argued that he had killed Tate in order to steal an aircraft he had previously agreed to buy, he then killed the other three men when they unexpectedly showed up at the hangar. Investigators found parts of the plane in his home, as well as Fiocchi ammunition similar to what was used in the killings. The prosecution argued that the ammunition provided a vital link, as its type was very rare.

Bower initially lied to the investigators, asserting that he had never been to the hangar where the murders took place. He later acknowledged being there, but maintained his innocence, arguing that the men were alive when he left with the disassembled plane he had purchased, although he was not able to produce a receipt for the transaction.

On April 28, 1984, Bower was found guilty of four counts of capital murder and was sentenced to death.

== Subsequent investigations ==
After Bower's conviction, his lawyers argued the prosecution had withheld information relating to a police tip that the killings may have been connected to drug trafficking, noting the high level of drug activity in the area and Tate's history of selling cocaine. Further questions concerning Bower's innocence were raised in 1989, when a woman called Pearl called one of Bower's attorney's, explaining that the killings were the result of a drug deal gone wrong, and that her ex-boyfriend Lynn and three of his friends, Ches, Rocky and Bear were responsible. The defence lawyers also argued that the Fiocchi ammunition type was not rare, was widely sold for small game shooting and practice shooting and the state prosecutors knew this at the trial. The wife of one of the men said she believed her husband had committed the murder. She said that he owned a .22 caliber pistol which used Fiocchi ammunition.

Numerous appeals have been brought since Bower's conviction, questioning how Bower was sentenced to death, despite there being no physical evidence pinning him to the crime scene, such as fingerprints, and no witnesses.

== Execution ==
Bower was executed by lethal injection in the Huntsville Unit and pronounced dead at 6:36 p.m on June 3, 2015, hours after the United States Supreme Court rejected a last-ditch appeal from Bower's lawyer. Justice Stephen Breyer, as well as Justices Ruth Bader Ginsburg and Sonia Sotomayor dissented from the majority.

In his final statement, Bower thanked his family and friends for their support, as well as his attorneys, saying "I have fought the good fight, I held my faith. I am not going to say goodbye, I will simply say, until we meet again. I love you very, very much."

== See also ==
- List of people executed in Texas, 2010–2019
- List of people executed in the United States in 2015

Executions carried out in Texas
Preceded by Derrick Dewayne Charles; May 12, 2015	Lester Leroy Bower Jr. June 3, 2015	Succeeded by Gregory Lynn Russeau; June 18, 2015
Executions carried out in the United States
Preceded by Derrick Dewayne Charles – Texas; May 12, 2015	Lester Leroy Bower Jr. – Texas; June 3, 2015	Succeeded by Richard Lamont Strong – Missouri; June 9, 2015
