= Lethal Injection Secrecy Act =

The Lethal Injection Secrecy Act is a statute in the US state of Georgia that was signed by the state's governor, Nathan Deal, and went into effect in July 2013. The law makes the identities of people who prescribe drugs used in lethal injections, as well as those of the companies that produce and supply them, state secrets. It also makes the identities of prison staff who carry out executions a state secret. It has been called the strictest law of its kind in the country.

== Legal challenges ==
In July 2013, the law was challenged by the lawyers of Warren Hill, a prisoner who was sentenced to death in 1989 for murdering his cellmate in prison while serving a life sentence for murdering his girlfriend. Hill's lawyers argued that the law was unconstitutional. On July 18, Fulton County Superior Court Judge Gail S. Tusan granted a stay on Hill's execution, on the basis that the secrecy law violated the First Amendment by concealing information "essential to the determination of the efficacy and potency of lethal injection drugs" from the public. The state appealed this ruling, and in May 2014, the Georgia Supreme Court upheld the secrecy law. On February 2, 2016, the 11th U.S. Circuit Court of Appeals rejected a request from Brandon Astor Jones' lawyers that his execution be stayed on the basis that he had waited too long to request such a stay. The five dissenting judges in this ruling warned of the dangers of the secrecy law's effects—namely, not knowing the qualifications of the company that made the drug or its source.
