= Execution of Licho Escamilla =

American convicted murderer executed in Texas (1982–2015)

Licho Escamilla
- Born: July 3, 1982; Dallas County, Texas, U.S.
- Died: October 14, 2015 (aged 33); Huntsville Unit, Huntsville, Texas, U.S.
- Cause of death: Execution by lethal injection
- Status: Executed
- Conviction: Capital murder
- Penalty: Death

Details
- Victims: Christopher Kevin James, 34
- Date: November 25, 2001
- Location: Dallas, Texas
- Imprisoned at: Allan B. Polunsky Unit

Licho Escamilla (July 3, 1982 − October 14, 2015) was an American convicted murderer executed for the 2001 murder of 34-year-old Dallas police officer Christopher Kevin James in Texas. Escamilla was found guilty of the murder of James who was shot twice by Escamilla while trying to break up a fight at a nightclub on November 25, 2001, and sentenced to death on October 31, 2002.

== Crime and arrest ==
According to court documents, Escamilla shot James twice, knocking him to the ground, and then fired three more shots into the back of his head. While attempting to flee, he continued to exchange fire with other police officers.

There was a warrant issued for Escamilla in the weeks leading up to James' death in connection with the shooting death of 18 year old Santos Gauna. Gauna was killed at a party celebrating his high school graduation and decision to enlist in the United States Marine Corps. Escamilla fled to Mexico after Gauna's murder.

Escamilla was eventually apprehended in connection with James' murder. He privately told his attorneys that he murdered Gauna. This admission was protected by attorney-client privilege. Quintin Alonzo was wrongly convicted of killing Gauna in 2003.

Escamilla did not confess publicly to Gauna's murder until the day of his execution. The local Conviction Integrity Unit began a three-year long investigation into Alonzo's wrongful conviction. In 2018, the Texas Court of Criminal Appeals made a final ruling of "actual innocence" for Alonzo.

== Legal proceedings ==
Escamilla admitted to killing James on a televised interview he gave while in prison. Escamilla's defense attorneys did not contest his guilt. Instead, attempting to avoid the death penalty, they argued that the murder of an off-duty police officer was not capital murder. Escamilla was convicted in 2002 and received a death sentence. News outlets reported that he became very agitated and aggressive when the sentence was announced in Court.

After 13 years on death row Escamilla filed a habeas corpus petition claiming mitigating evidence of an abusive childhood and substance abuse disorder that was not presented during sentencing. The Court of Appeals for the Fifth Circuit allowed Escamilla to appeal the district court's denial of his habeas petition and rejected his argument that Martinez v. Ryan and Trevino v. Thaler permitted the district court to consider new evidence on appeal that was not submitted to the state habeas court. The Fifth Circuit considered Escamilla's Strickland claim without the new evidence and affirmed the district court's judgment. The United States Supreme Court denied his petition for certiorari.

== Death ==
Escamilla was executed on October 14, 2015 at the age of 33. He had been on death row for 13 years.

== See also ==
- Capital punishment in Texas
- List of people executed in Texas, 2010–2019
- List of people executed in the United States in 2015

Executions carried out in Texas
Preceded by Juan Martin Garcia; October 6, 2015	Licho Escamilla; October 14, 2015	Succeeded by Raphael Deon Holiday; November 18, 2015
Executions carried out in the United States
Preceded by Juan Martin Garcia – Texas; October 6, 2015	Licho Escamilla – Texas; October 14, 2015	Succeeded by Jerry William Correll – Florida; October 29, 2015
