= Texas Seven =

Group of American escaped convicts

The seven inmates involved in the escape. Top row, left to right, Joseph Garcia, Randy Halprin, Larry James Harper, and Patrick Murphy Jr. Bottom row, left to right, Donald Newbury, George Rivas, and Michael Anthony Rodriguez.

The Texas 7 were a group of prisoners who escaped from the John B. Connally Unit near Kenedy, Texas, United States, on December 13, 2000. Six of the seven were apprehended over a month later, between January 22–24, 2001, as a direct result of the television show America's Most Wanted. One of the prisoners committed suicide before he could be arrested. The surviving members were all convicted and sentenced to death for the murder of police officer Aubrey Wright Hawkins, who was shot and killed when responding to a robbery committed by the Texas Seven. These are the most death sentences that have been imposed in a single case in modern American history.

Four of the six have since been executed, while one of the surviving two has been granted a new trial based on alleged judicial bias.

== Members ==
The group included the following Texas state prisoners:

- Joseph Christopher Garcia (November 6, 1971, in San Antonio, Texas – December 4, 2018, in Huntsville, Texas), executed.
  - Garcia was serving a 50-year sentence for murder for stabbing Miguel Luna to death during a drunken altercation in 1996.
- Randy Ethan Halprin (born September 13, 1977, in McKinney, Texas), convicted and sentenced to death in 2003 but awarded a new trial by the Texas Court of Criminal Appeals on November 6, 2024.
  - Halprin was serving a 30-year sentence for child abuse after "[breaking] a 16-month-old's arms and legs, fracturing his skull and beating his face until one eye filled with blood." He has written about this incident in his self-published memoir Falling Down. He completed his 30-year sentence on September 5, 2026. Halprin married while incarcerated, and he got a divorce in 2010. He married again in 2026.
- Larry James Harper (September 10, 1963, in Danville, Illinois – January 22, 2001, in Woodland Park, Colorado), committed suicide by a gunshot to the heart before he could be captured by law enforcement.
  - Harper was serving a 50-year sentence for three counts of aggravated sexual assault for beating and raping three women in El Paso. He tied up all of his victims, including one to a tree. Harper committed the rapes after being rejected by a woman.
- Patrick Henry Murphy Jr. (born October 3, 1961, in Dallas, Texas), Scheduled to be executed on April 7, 2027.
  - Murphy was serving a 50-year sentence for breaking into the apartment of a high school acquaintance in 1984, covering her head with a pillowcase, and raping her at knifepoint. He had previously been dishonorably discharged from the Army.
- Donald Keith Newbury (May 18, 1962, in Albuquerque, New Mexico – February 4, 2015, in Huntsville, Texas), executed.
  - Newbury was serving a 99-year sentence for aggravated robbery with a deadly weapon. In 1998, he walked into an Austin hotel with a sawed-off shotgun and demanded money from a clerk. The clerk was not injured. Newbury had two separate prior convictions for aggravated robbery.
- George Angel Rivas Jr. (May 6, 1970, in El Paso, Texas – February 29, 2012, in Huntsville, Texas), executed.
  - Rivas, the mastermind of the escape, was serving 18 life sentences for 13 counts of aggravated kidnapping, four counts of aggravated robbery, and one count of burglary of a habitation. Rivas was convicted of a string of intricately planned robberies involving the use of disguises and walkie-talkies. He married a Canadian woman by proxy. Rivas had once aspired to be a police officer.
- Michael Anthony Rodriguez (October 29, 1962, in San Antonio, Texas – August 14, 2008, in Huntsville, Texas), executed.
  - Rodriguez was serving a life sentence for capital murder for hiring Rolando Ruiz to murder his wife Theresa in 1992. Also convicted were Rodriguez's brother Mark, Joe Ramon and Robert Silva. An alumnus of Central Catholic Marianist High School, Rodriguez had taken teacher training classes at Southwest Texas State University (now Texas State University). Rodriguez's father, Raul Rodriguez, pleaded guilty to escape and providing implements for escape and elected to have a jury determine his sentence. He was sentenced to 10 years for escape and 5 years for providing implements for escape and fined $10,000 for each of the convictions. A later appeal was rejected in 2006.

== Escape ==
On December 13, 2000, the seven carried out an elaborate scheme and escaped from the John B. Connally Unit, a maximum-security state prison near the South Texas city of Kenedy.

At the time of the breakout, the reported ringleader of the Texas Seven, 30-year-old George Rivas, was serving 18 consecutive 15-to-life sentences. Michael Anthony Rodriguez, 38, was serving a 99-to-life term for contracting the murder of his wife by Rolando Ruiz Jr., who was later executed for the crime on March 7, 2017. Larry James Harper, 37, Joseph Garcia, 29, and Patrick Henry Murphy Jr., 39, were all serving 50-year sentences. Donald Keith Newbury, 38, the member with the longest rap sheet in the group, was serving a 99-year sentence. The youngest member, Randy Halprin, 23, was serving a 30-year sentence for injury to a child.

At around 11:20 a.m. the seven men overpowered prison workers and guards, took the latter's uniforms, stole 14 handguns, a shotgun, an AR-15 rifle and more than 100 rounds of ammunition before fleeing north in a prison truck. The victims were left unconscious and tied up inside an electrical room. Rodriguez's father, Raul, had provided the men a getaway car. For this act, he was later convicted of escape and providing implements for escape.

A Crime Library article about the seven compared the breakout to the June 1962 Alcatraz escape that occurred decades earlier.

== Crime spree and Officer Aubrey Hawkins ==
Aubrey Hawkins, the police officer killed by the Texas Seven

The white prison truck was found in the Walmart parking lot in Kenedy, Texas. The Texas Seven first entered San Antonio right after breaking out of the complex. Realizing that they were running out of funds, they robbed a Radio Shack in Pearland, Texas, in Greater Houston, the following day.

On December 19, four of the members checked into an Econo Lodge motel in Farmers Branch, Texas, in the Dallas-Fort Worth area, under assumed names. They decided to rob a Sports Authority in nearby Irving. On December 24, 2000, they entered the store, bound and gagged all the staff, and stole at least 40 guns and sets of ammunition, including $70,000 from the store's safe. An ex-employee in her car outside the store noticed the commotion inside and called the police. Irving police officer Aubrey Wright Hawkins (February 23, 1971 – December 24, 2000) responded to the call and, upon arriving at the scene, was almost immediately ambushed, being shot 11 times and run over by the escaped convicts as they fled the scene. Hawkins died at Parkland Memorial Hospital in Dallas shortly after his arrival. Hawkins had been an officer with the Irving police department since October 4, 1995, and was married and had a son.

== Capture ==
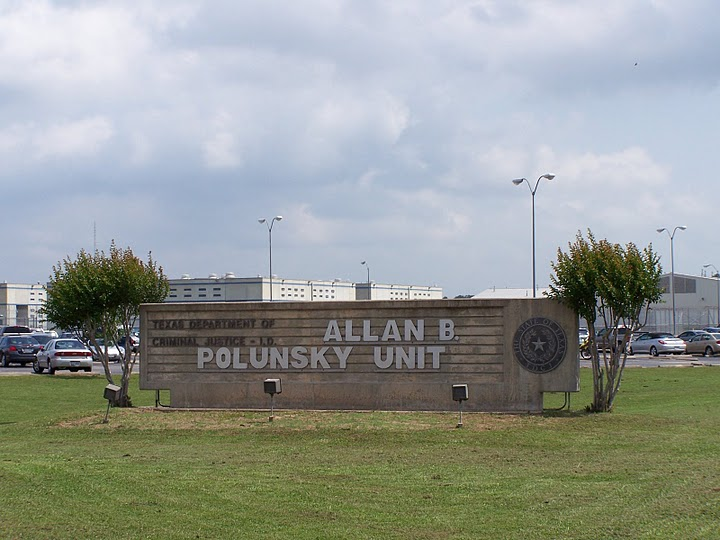
The surviving members are held at the Allan B. Polunsky Unit.

Following an episode of the television show America's Most Wanted that first aired on January 20, 2001, several people phoned in possible sightings of the suspects at the Coachlight Motel and R.V. Park in Woodland Park, Colorado. They had apparently tried to pass themselves off as missionaries, playing loud Christian music within earshot of their neighbors.

The El Paso County Sheriff's Office, Colorado, and Teller County Deputies SWAT team found Garcia, Rodriguez, and Rivas in a Jeep Cherokee in the RV Park, before following them to a nearby gas station where they were arrested, and later found Halprin and Harper in an RV; Halprin surrendered peacefully, but Harper was found dead after a standoff, having shot himself in the chest with a pistol. The surviving four were taken into federal custody.

On January 23, 2001, the FBI received information that the remaining two escapees, Newbury and Murphy, were hiding in a Holiday Inn in Colorado Springs, Colorado. A deal was brokered with the two, allowing them to make live TV appearances before they were arrested. Media was tipped off when a guest asked KKTV chief photographer Mike Petkash and reporter Jeannette Hinds why he could not get to the hotel. The pair drove to the hotel, finding it flooded with law enforcement. In the early hours of January 24, a local KKTV television anchorman, Eric Singer, was taken into the hotel where he interviewed the two by telephone while on camera. Newbury and Murphy harshly denounced the criminal justice system in Texas, with Newbury adding, "the system is as corrupt as we are."

== Convictions and executions ==
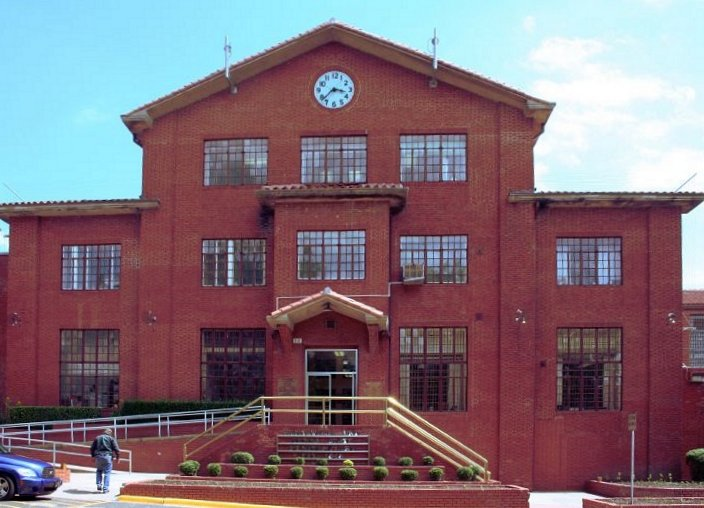
Huntsville Unit, where Rivas, Rodriguez, Newbury, and Garcia were executed.

In 2008, authorities indicted Patsy Gomez and Raul Rodriguez, the parents of Michael Rodriguez, for conspiring to help the Texas Seven.

George Rivas, the ringleader, was the first to be brought to trial; he was convicted and sentenced to death. Subsequently, the other five surviving members of the Texas Seven were brought to trial, convicted, and sentenced to death.

Rodriguez announced that he wished to forgo further appeal beyond the mandatory death-penalty appeal to the Texas Court of Criminal Appeals. A court-ordered psychiatric evaluation in January 2007 concluded that he was mentally competent to decide to forgo further appeals. Twenty months later, he became the first of the six surviving members to be executed on August 14, 2008 by lethal injection.

George Rivas was executed by lethal injection on February 29, 2012. Donald Newbury was executed by lethal injection on February 4, 2015. Rolando Ruiz, who was involved in Rodriguez's previous murder conviction, was executed by lethal injection on March 7, 2017. Joseph Garcia was executed by lethal injection on December 4, 2018. The bodies of Harper, Rodriguez, Newbury, and Garcia are buried at Captain Joe Byrd Cemetery.

The remaining two members, Halprin and Murphy, are incarcerated on death row at the Polunsky Unit of the Texas Department of Criminal Justice, located in West Livingston. Halprin has won a second trial over alleged racial bias in the selection of his jury. Murphy is currently scheduled to be executed on April 7, 2027.

Murphy has had two previous execution dates that were stayed. The first was March 28, 2019. Murphy, who converted to Buddhism on death row, was granted a last-minute reprieve by the United States Supreme Court on the basis that TDCJ's denial of his request to have a Buddhist priest in the execution room with him violated the Establishment Clause and Free Exercise Clause of the United States Constitution. Murphy was then given a second execution date of November 13, 2019. However, his execution was stayed by the United States District Court for the Southern District of Texas on November 7 to decide whether his religious discrimination lawsuit had merit. On October 30, 2026, the TDCJ indicated that Murphy had received a third execution date of April 7, 2027. The outcome of this third warrant is currently pending.

Halprin was scheduled to be executed on October 10, 2019. However, his execution was stayed by the Texas Court of Criminal Appeals on October 4, 2019, due to concerns of racial and religious discrimination from his trial judge. Judge Vickers "Vic" Cunningham allegedly referred to Halprin, who is Jewish, as a "kike" and a "fucking Jew" and said Jews "needed to be shut down because they controlled all the money." On November 6, 2024, the Texas Court of Criminal Appeals granted Halprin's request for a new trial based on the finding that Judge Cunningham's antisemitic bias deprived Halprin of due process of law. Halprin's second trial is scheduled to begin in Dallas County on April 5, 2027.

== Media portrayals ==
In 2001, the American Court TV (now TruTV) television series Mugshots released an episode covering Rivas, titled Mugshots - George Rivas.

In 2007, Wild Dream Films produced The Hunt For The Texas 7, a 90-minute feature documentary about the prison break. The film features interviews with members of The Texas 7 currently on Death Row and eyewitnesses to their crimes. The film was aired in late September 2008 on MSNBC.

On March 25, 2011, Investigation Discovery aired an episode about the case on the docuseries FBI: Criminal Pursuit, subtitled "The Deadly Seven". One year later, on March 23, 2012, Investigation Discovery aired an episode of Werner Herzog's documentary series On Death Row, which dealt with Rivas and Garcia.

On July 30, 2014, Investigation Discovery's I (Almost) Got Away with It aired an episode titled "Got to Be Part of the Texas Seven".

In Spring 2019, ITV UK produced the series: Death Row: Countdown To Execution hosted by Susanna Reid. Episode 1 chronicles the case of one of the members of Texas 7: Patrick Murphy. The series aired in the UK in June 2019.

The December 8, 2023, episode of the Oxygen Network series "Homicide for the Holidays" portrayed the events in an episode entitled "Christmas Eve Killing".

== See also ==
- List of people scheduled to be executed in the United States
- List of people executed in the United States in 2008
- List of people executed in the United States in 2012
- List of people executed in the United States in 2015
- List of people executed in the United States in 2018
- List of people executed in Texas, 2000–2009
- List of people executed in Texas, 2010–2019

Executions carried out in Texas
Preceded by Leon David Dorsey IV August 12, 2008	Michael Anthony Rodriguez; August 14, 2008	Succeeded by William Alfred Murray September 17, 2008
Executions carried out in the United States
Preceded by Leon David Dorsey IV – Texas August 12, 2008	Michael Anthony Rodriguez – Texas; August 14, 2008	Succeeded by Jack Edward Alderman – Georgia September 16, 2008
Executions carried out in Texas
Preceded by Rodrigo Hernandez January 26, 2012	George Angel Rivas; February 29, 2012	Succeeded by Keith Steven Thurmond March 7, 2012
Executions carried out in the United States
Preceded by Robert Henry Moormann – Arizona February 29, 2012	George Angel Rivas – Texas; February 29, 2012	Succeeded by Keith Steven Thurmond – Texas March 7, 2012
Executions carried out in Texas
Preceded by Robert Charles Ladd January 29, 2015	Donald Keith Newbury; February 4, 2015	Succeeded by Manuel Vasquez March 11, 2015
Executions carried out in the United States
Preceded by Robert Charles Ladd – Texas January 29, 2015	Donald Keith Newbury – Texas; February 4, 2015	Succeeded by Walter Timothy Storey – Missouri February 11, 2015
Executions carried out in Texas
Preceded by Terry Darnell Edwards January 26, 2017	Rolando Ruiz Jr. March 7, 2017	Succeeded by James Eugene Bigby March 14, 2017
Executions carried out in the United States
Preceded by Mark Anthony Christeson – Missouri January 31, 2017	Rolando Ruiz Jr. – Texas; March 14, 2017	Succeeded by James Eugene Bigby – Texas March 14, 2017
Executions carried out in Texas
Preceded by Robert Moreno Ramos November 14, 2018	Joseph Christopher Garcia; December 4, 2018	Succeeded by Alvin Avon Braziel Jr. December 11, 2018
Executions carried out in the United States
Preceded by Roberto Moreno Ramos – Texas November 14, 2018	Joseph Christopher Garcia – Texas; December 4, 2018	Succeeded by David Earl Miller – Tennessee December 6, 2018
