= Murder of Kyle Dinkheller =

1998 killing of a U.S. policeman

- Snapshot of Dinkheller's dash camera footage during the traffic stop, just before the confrontation and shootout with Brannan
- Date: January 12, 1998; 5:34 p.m. (EST)
- Location: Whipple Crossing Road Laurens County, Georgia, U.S.; 32.517443°N 83.078321°W
- Perpetrator: Andrew H. Brannan
- Deaths: 1
- Injuries: 1 (the perpetrator)
- Verdict: Guilty (January 28, 2000)
- Convictions: Murder
- Sentence: Death (January 13, 2015)

On January 12, 1998, Andrew Brannan, a 49-year-old Vietnam War veteran, fatally shot 22-year-old deputy sheriff Kyle Dinkheller after a traffic stop in Laurens County, Georgia. Stopped for speeding, the two men exited their vehicles and greeted each other normally, but Brannan became belligerent after Dinkheller told him to take his hands out of his pockets, sparking a verbal confrontation and subsequently a gunfight that ended with Brannan fatally shooting Dinkheller. The entire incident was recorded by the dash camera in Dinkheller's police cruiser and thus received significant attention throughout the United States, where it continues to be shown in many police academies for training purposes.

Dinkheller was armed with his semi-automatic service pistol, while Brannan was armed with his semi-automatic M1 Carbine. The two men fired numerous shots at each other, but the deputy was hit nine times in various parts of his body before he managed to wound Brannan, who was hit in his stomach. Despite this, Brannan continued shooting, then reloaded his rifle and fired a lethal shot into Dinkheller's eye, following which he fled the scene in his Toyota pickup truck. He was arrested the next morning, when officers found him hiding in a sleeping bag beneath a camouflage tarp, still within Laurens County.

While on trial, Brannan pleaded not guilty by reason of insanity, claiming in part that he had been suffering from post-traumatic stress disorder due to his military service in Vietnam. However, citing the footage on Dinkheller's dash camera, which captured most of Brannan's actions during the traffic stop, the jury found that the deputy had been murdered in a premeditated, torturous, and cruel manner. On January 28, 2000, Brannan was convicted and, two days later, sentenced to death. On January 13, 2015, the day after the 17th anniversary of Dinkheller’s murder, he was executed via lethal injection.

== Encounter ==
=== Traffic stop ===
On January 12, 1998, near the end of his shift, Deputy Kyle Wayne Dinkheller of the Laurens County, Georgia, sheriff's office, encountered a speeding Toyota Pickup near Dudley, Georgia, United States, which he clocked at around 98 miles per hour (158 km/h). The deputy pulled the truck over on Whipple Crossing Road, adjacent to Interstate 16. The traffic stop at first appeared to be routine, with both Dinkheller and the driver, Andrew Brannan, exiting their vehicles and exchanging greetings. Brannan, however, placed both hands into his pockets, at which point Dinkheller instructed him to remove his hands and keep them in plain view.

At this point, Brannan became belligerent and yelled at the deputy to shoot him. He then began to dance and wave his arms in the middle of the road. Dinkheller radioed the dispatcher for assistance and issued commands for Brannan to cease his behavior and approach the cruiser. When Brannan saw that Dinkheller was calling for other units, he ran toward the deputy in an aggressive manner. Dinkheller retreated while issuing commands and utilized his baton to keep Brannan at bay. On Dinkheller's dashcam video, Brannan was heard shouting that he was a "goddamned Vietnam combat veteran."

=== Shootout ===
Despite commands issued by Dinkheller, Brannan walked back to his pickup truck and drew an Iver Johnson M1 Carbine from underneath the driver's seat, taking cover near the driver side door. Dinkheller positioned himself near the passenger door of his cruiser and gave Brannan commands for approximately forty seconds before Brannan stepped away from his pickup truck, pointed his rifle at Dinkheller and fired several shots. Dinkheller fired the first shot at Brannan but missed, leading some to speculate that it might have been a warning shot. Dinkheller did not strike Brannan initially and thus was forced to reload.

At this point, Brannan ran from his truck toward Dinkheller and began to fire again, hitting the deputy in exposed areas such as the arms and legs. Brannan then began to reload his weapon as the now-injured Dinkheller tried to position himself near the driver side door of his cruiser. Brannan appeared to go back to his car to retreat before another shot from Dinkheller was heard. This enraged Brannan, who began advancing and firing at the deputy, hitting him numerous times. Before being disabled from gunfire, Dinkheller was able to inflict a gunshot wound to Brannan's stomach. Dinkheller had been shot nine times when Brannan took careful aim, said, "Die, fucker!" and fired a final fatal shot into Dinkheller's right eye. Brannan then retreated into his truck and fled the scene.

=== Aftermath ===
Brannan was arrested the next morning without incident; he told the investigating authorities that "they can hang me". He was found guilty on January 28, 2000, for the murder of Dinkheller and was sentenced to death. On January 2, 2015, the Georgia Department of Corrections announced that an execution date of January 13 had been set for Brannan. On January 6, a clemency hearing was set for January 12, at which the Georgia State Board of Pardons and Paroles voted to deny clemency. On January 13, Brannan was executed by lethal injection, the first person in the U.S. to be executed in 2015.

== Perpetrator ==
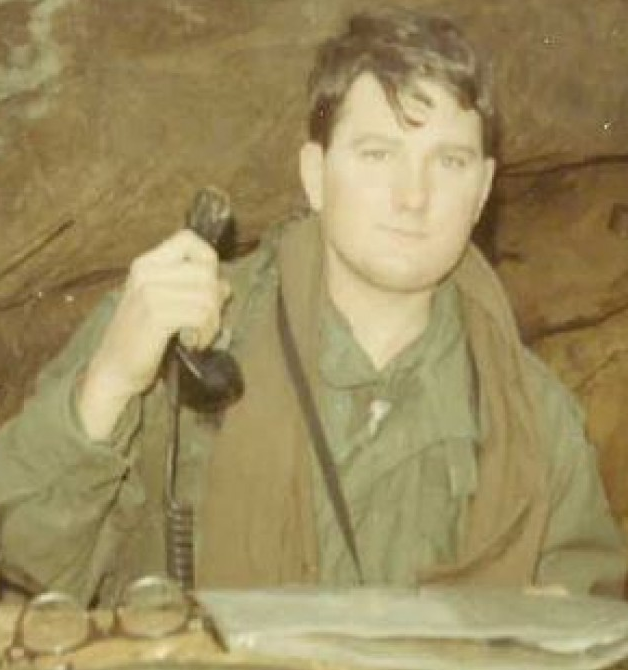
Brannan in Vietnam, 1970

Andrew Howard Brannan was born on Maxwell Air Force Base in Montgomery, Alabama on November 26, 1948. He graduated from high school in 1967.

In August 1968, Brannan joined the United States Army and received his induction training at Fort Benning in Georgia. In February 1969, he entered the artillery officer candidate school at Oklahoma's Fort Sill and was commissioned as an artillery officer in July 1969. While he was still in the U.S., Brannan served with the 82nd Airborne Division. In July 1969, he was ordered to service in the Vietnam War, where he served in the Field Artillery Branch as a forward observer and executive officer with the 23rd Infantry Division at Chu Lai, South Vietnam, until July 1971.

During his service, Brannan witnessed an officer being killed after stepping on a landmine, an incident he later recalled during a psychiatric interview in 1989. He also assumed command of a company on two occasions, after its commander was killed. Afterwards, Brannan arrived at Washington state's Fort Lewis, where he transferred to the United States Army Reserve, in which he served, periodically, for two weeks at a time until being discharged in June 1975.

During his time in the Army, Brannan was awarded the Bronze Star and two instances of the Army Commendation Medal. While in the military, his superiors spoke favorably of him, saying that he was an "outstanding" and "exemplary" officer.

Brannan's defense was that he suffered from post traumatic stress disorder (PTSD) as the result of serving in battle. In 1975, he was married, although the couple divorced six years later as a result of Brannan's violent behavior stemming from his PTSD. A psychologist for the defense indicated that the bizarre encounter with Dinkheller in January 1998 "was likely the result of a flashback to Brannan's time in combat." In 1994, the Department of Veterans Affairs had declared Brannan 100% disabled for experiencing depression and bipolar disorder.

Although Brannan's lawyers tried to get his death sentence commuted on the grounds that he was not criminally responsible for his conviction by reason of insanity, both the Georgia Supreme Court and the United States Supreme Court refused to intervene on his behalf on the day his execution was scheduled to take place. Brannan was executed by lethal injection at 8:33 p.m. (EST) on January 13, 2015, the first person executed in the U.S. in 2015. He was 66 years old at the time of his death at the Georgia Diagnostic and Classification State Prison near Jackson, Georgia.

Brannan made a final statement, in which he said, "I extend my condolences to the Dinkheller family, especially Kyle's parents and his wife and his two children" and, "I feel like my status was slow torture for the last fifteen years. I had to say that with them here. I have to tell the truth. I'm certainly glad to be leaving." A pastor then delivered a prayer and Brannan was executed. He was executed one day after the 17-year anniversary of the shooting.

== Victim ==
Dinkheller in 1997

Kyle Wayne Dinkheller was a deputy with the Laurens County Sheriff's Office (LCSO) in the U.S. state of Georgia. After his death, he was named the 1998 Deputy Sheriff of the Year by the Georgia Sheriffs' Association.

Dinkheller was born on June 18, 1975, in San Diego, California to Kirk Dinkheller. He graduated from California's Quartz Hill High School in 1993. He joined the LCSO as a jailer in March 1995 and became a certified police officer with the State of Georgia in 1996. He was 22 years old when he was killed.

=== The "Dinkheller video" ===
The video recording of the killing, known as the "Dinkheller video", has become ubiquitous in U.S. police academies.

The video has, for instance, been adapted to include an interactive sequence in which trainees encounter Brannan before he kills Dinkheller. Police trainers use this setup to test officers' willingness to use deadly force, and to impart to them that "there could be a time... when pulling the trigger is the only way".

== In popular culture ==
- The incident is the focus of the 2014 short film Random Stop.
- The incident is the focus of the 2018 documentary film, Dinkheller.
- The incident is sampled in the song "I Just Killed A Cop Now I'm Horny" by rapper JPEGMAFIA.

== See also ==
- List of law enforcement officers killed in the line of duty in the United States
- List of people executed in Georgia (U.S. state)
- List of people executed in the United States in 2015

Executions carried out in Georgia
Preceded by Robert Wayne Holsey December 9, 2014	Andrew Howard Brannan; January 13, 2015	Succeeded by Warren Lee Hill Jr. January 27, 2015
Executions carried out in the United States
Preceded by Paul Terrence Goodwin – Missouri December 10, 2014	Andrew Howard Brannan – Georgia; January 13, 2015	Succeeded by Charles Frederick Warner – Oklahoma January 15, 2015
