= Erica Sheppard =

American woman and convicted killer on death row in Texas

- Born: Erica Yvonne Sheppard; September 1, 1973 (age 53); Matagorda County, Texas, U.S.
- Status: Incarcerated on death row
- Motive: Robbery
- Convictions: Capital murder Robbery
- Penalty: Death (April 25, 1995)

Details
- Victims: Marilyn Sage Meagher, 43
- Date: June 30, 1993
- Location: Texas
- Imprisoned at: Patrick O'Daniel Unit

Erica Yvonne Sheppard (born September 1, 1973) is an American convicted murderer and female death row inmate imprisoned in Texas. On June 30, 1993, in Houston, Sheppard and her male accomplice James Dickerson robbed Marilyn Meagher of her car, and stabbed her five times, before they wrapped Meagher's head in a plastic bag and bludgeoned her in the head with a 10-pound statue. Sheppard and Dickerson fled to the former's hometown in Bay City, Texas, and they were eventually arrested. Sheppard was convicted of capital murder and robbery and sentenced to death in 1995. Dickerson was similarly sentenced to death, but he died on death row in 1999 due to AIDS. As of 2025, Sheppard is currently incarcerated at the Patrick O'Daniel Unit, and she is the longest-serving female prisoner on Texas's death row.

== Early life ==
Erica Yvonne Sheppard was born in a rice field in Texas on September 1, 1973. Sheppard, who had a brother, was a victim of abuse inflicted by her mother, who was also frequently beaten by Sheppard's alcoholic father. Instances of abuse included Sheppard's mother disciplining her daughter and son with a leather belt and switches from a plum tree. At one point, Sheppard was strangled with a telephone cord by her mother but survived, and she later sought refuge in a youth shelter as a result. Sheppard and her brother were sometimes entrusted to the care of another woman by their mother, but the caretaker also abused the two children, and even forced Sheppard to perform oral sex on her own boyfriend.

Sheppard, who failed her fourth grade, dropped out of school at the tenth grade. Sheppard also had three children fathered separately by three different men. Sheppard married Jerry Bryant Jr., the father of her youngest child, but Bryant abused her and even threatened to kill her if Sheppard wanted to leave him.

== Murder of Marilyn Meagher ==
On June 30, 1993, 19-year-old Erica Sheppard and an accomplice committed the murder of a woman in Houston, Texas.

Both Sheppard and a man named James Dickerson, with whom Sheppard had a relationship after running away from her husband, planned to steal a car to drive Sheppard back to her hometown in Bay City, Texas. As they passed through a local apartment in Houston, they saw 43-year-old Marilyn Sage Meagher unpacking her car and that her apartment's front door was unlocked. Selecting Meagher as their target, both Sheppard and Dickerson sneaked into the apartment and waited for her to enter.

When Meagher entered her apartment, both Sheppard and Dickerson confronted her and demanded her to hand over her car keys, but Meagher refused. Afterwards, the couple used a large knife to stab Meagher five times. Subsequently, Dickerson wielded a 4 kg (8.2 lb) statue and used it to bludgeon Meagher as Sheppard held her down. The attack persisted despite Meagher's plea for mercy, and Meagher died a result of the stabbing and assault.

The body of Meagher was eventually discovered by one of her daughters. Two days after the murder, Sheppard and Dickerson were both arrested at a motel in Bay City, and were subsequently charged with the murder of Meagher.

== Trial and sentencing ==
On March 1, 1995, a Harris County jury found Sheppard guilty of capital murder and robbery.

On March 3, 1995, the jury unanimously recommended the death penalty for Sheppard. Sheppard became the 5th female inmate on death row since the 1976 resumption of capital punishment. At the time of Sheppard's sentencing, Texas had not carried out the execution of a woman since 1863. Sheppard's mother, who was present at the time of sentencing, stated that her daughter did not deserve to die, claiming she was merely at the wrong place at the wrong time.

On April 25, 1995, 21-year-old Erica Yvonne Sheppard was formally sentenced to death by Judge H. Lon Harper.

Dickerson was convicted of capital murder and sentenced to death for his role in the killing of Meagher on May 20, 1994. It was revealed that during his trial, a doctor testified that Dickerson was HIV-positive and likely had three to five years left to live due to the severity of his condition, but the jury went ahead with a death sentence for Dickerson. Five years later, on September 10, 1999, 26-year-old Dickerson died in prison due to complications of late stage AIDS.

== Appeals ==
On June 18, 1997, the Texas Court of Criminal Appeals rejected Erica Sheppard's direct appeal against her death sentence.

On October 9, 2013, the Texas Court of Criminal Appeals rejected another appeal from Sheppard.

On May 19, 2014, Sheppard's appeal was turned down by the U.S. Supreme Court.

On March 29, 2017, Sheppard's appeal was rejected by U.S. District Judge Nancy Atlas of the U.S. District Court for the Southern District of Texas.

On July 22, 2020, the 5th Circuit Court of Appeals dismissed Sheppard's appeal.

On May 24, 2021, Sheppard's final appeal was denied by the U.S. Supreme Court.

== 1998 execution attempt ==
At one point in late 1997, Erica Sheppard requested to waive her remaining appeals and volunteered to be executed. Ultimately, a group of psychiatrists certified that Sheppard was mentally competent to waive her appeals.

On January 15, 1998, Judge H. Lon Harper signed a death warrant for Sheppard, scheduling her to be executed on April 20, 1998. Sheppard was the second woman to be issued an execution date after Karla Faye Tucker, who was found guilty of murdering two people with a pickaxe, and scheduled to be executed on February 3, 1998. Both Tucker and Sheppard were the first two women slated to be executed since the American Civil War.

During the final weeks before Sheppard's execution was to proceed, her case attracted the attention of American civil rights activist, Reverend Jesse Jackson. Jackson, who was an outspoken opponent of capital punishment, took interest in Sheppard's case and intended to visit her in early April 1998 and advocate her case, although Sheppard did not change her mind about her execution and never sought clemency.

On March 27, 1998, Sheppard filed a motion to vacate her execution date and asked to continue pursuing further appeals against her death sentence. In the end, Sheppard's motion was granted by Judge Harper, who cancelled Sheppard's upcoming execution.

On April 8, 1998, Jackson visited Sheppard in prison, and he encouraged her to continue appealing against her death sentence. In advocating against Sheppard's death sentence, Jackson cited that it was important for every convict to receive a fair and due process by the fullest extent entitled under the law. Jackson also advocated for the state to review the capital punishment laws, stating that the death penalty should be abolished and claimed that it was nothing more than revenge. Jackson stated he was also mindful of the suffering and pain endured by the family of the murder victim Marilyn Meagher, but he said that revenge was not the solution.

== Death row and aftermath ==
The murder of Marilyn Meagher was listed as one of the most infamous crimes committed by female death row prisoners in the United States.

As of February 1997, Sheppard was one of six women held on death row in Texas, and she was chronologically the fifth woman to be sentenced to death since the 1976 resumption of capital punishment in the U.S., and the first since 1989. The list also included Karla Faye Tucker, Betty Lou Beets, Frances Elaine Newton, Cathy Henderson and Pamela Perillo. Out of these five other women, Perillo and Henderson had their death sentences reduced, while the rest were executed between 1998 and 2005. By September 2000, Sheppard was one of the seven female convicts awaiting to be executed in Texas.

A 2013 news article revealed that ten women, including Sheppard, remained on death row in Texas for murder, and Sheppard, whose death sentence was imposed in 1993, spent the longest time on death row out of all the ten women, making her the longest-serving female prisoner on Texas's death row. The number fell to six as of September 2015, after the commutation of Henderson's death sentence and the executions of Lisa Ann Coleman, Suzanne Basso and Kimberly McCarthy. In 2022, when Taylor Rene Parker was sentenced to death for murdering her pregnant friend and abducting the victim's unborn baby, Sheppard was reported to be one of the seven female offenders (including Parker herself) held on death row in Texas as of 2022.

In May 2025, it was reported that Sheppard was among 11 people, and the only woman, imprisoned on death row for 30 years or more for murders committed within Harris County, which oversaw the sentencing of more than 200 people to death row since 1979, and 64 of these prisoners were among a total of 174 men and women that still remained on death row in Texas.

Erica Sheppard, who converted to Islam while on death row, is currently incarcerated at the Patrick O'Daniel Unit as of 2025.

== See also ==
- Capital punishment in Texas
- List of death row inmates in the United States § Texas
- List of women on death row in the United States § Texas
