= Frances Newton =

American murderer executed by the state of Texas (1965-2005)

- Born: Frances Elaine McLemore; April 12, 1965; Harris County, Texas, U.S.
- Died: September 14, 2005 (aged 40); Huntsville Unit, Texas, U.S.
- Status: Executed by lethal injection
- Motive: Life insurance money
- Convictions: Capital murder Forgery
- Penalty: Death (November 17, 1988)

Frances Elaine Newton (née McLemore; April 12, 1965 – September 14, 2005) was an American convicted mass murderer who was executed by lethal injection in the state of Texas for the April 7, 1987, murders of her estranged husband, Adrian, age 23, her 7-year-old son, Alton, and her 22-month-old daughter, Farrah.

Newton was just shy of her 22nd birthday when she committed the murders for which she was executed. She maintained her innocence to the end. Newton claimed that her husband was a drug addict and the murders were committed by a dealer, “Charlie,” to whom he owed money.

Newton was convicted on November 17, 1987, for killing her three family members "execution style" for life insurance money. It was reported that she and her husband had marital problems and were both dating other people. Newton was later executed at age 40.

== Forgery conviction ==
In December 1985, Newton was sentenced to three years of probation for forgery. A previous employer also testified that they'd fired Newton for stealing money.

== Murders ==
All three victims were shot with a .25 caliber pistol which belonged to a man that Newton had been seeing at the time. Newton claimed that a drug dealer killed the three. She maintained her innocence from her first interrogation in 1987 until her execution in 2005.

Prosecutors revealed that Newton had purchased life insurance policies for her husband, her daughter and herself just three weeks before the murders. The policies were valued at $50,000 each. Newton named herself as the beneficiary for her husband's and daughter's policies. She claimed that she forged her husband's signature in order to prevent him from discovering that she set aside money to pay the premiums. Prosecutors cited these facts as the basis for her motive.

Newton was also found to have placed a paper bag containing the murder weapon in a relative's home shortly after the murders. A witness testified that they saw her hide the bag in the house. Newton said she had found the gun in her home and removed it as a safety precaution. The gun belonged to Michael Mouton, who told the police that he'd loaned it to his cousin, Jeffrey Frelow, several months earlier. When the gun was shown to Frelow, he recognized it and said that he kept in a chest of drawers in his bedroom. He also said that Frances Newton, whom he'd recently started dating, often did his laundry and had easy access to the gun.

On October 25, 1988, Newton was found guilty of capital murder and sentenced to death.

== Death row ==
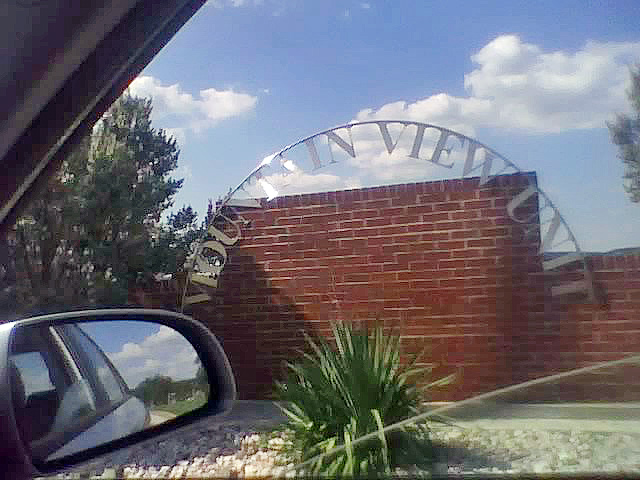
Mountain View Unit, where Newton was held

Two hours before her first scheduled execution on December 1, 2004, Texas Governor Rick Perry, heeding a recommendation from the Texas Board of Pardons and Paroles, granted a 120-day reprieve to allow more time to test forensic evidence in the case. There were also conflicting reports as to whether a second gun was recovered from the scene; ballistics reports appeared to demonstrate that a gun recovered by law enforcement and allegedly connected to Newton after the offense was the murder weapon. A relative of Newton who was incarcerated shortly after the murders claimed a person whom he shared a cell with boasted of killing the family. Numerous individuals, including a member of the convicting jury, expressed concern over evidence that was not presented during the trial.

Newton's skirt could not be tested further since it was contaminated. However, on February 11, 2005, defense expert Frederic Tulleners issued a report, affirming that the three bullets recovered from the bodies matched the .25 caliber pistol hidden by Newton. On August 24, 2005, the Texas Court of Criminal Appeals turned down a motion for a stay of execution. It turned down another appeal on September 9 for writ of habeas corpus. It was her fourth application. The Texas Board of Pardons and Paroles voted 7–0 on September 12 not to recommend that her sentence be commuted to life imprisonment. The same day the United States Court of Appeals for the Fifth Circuit refused an appeal of her sentence. Adrian Newton's parents asked for clemency on Newton's behalf out of opposition to capital punishment. However, the family was adamant that she was guilty.

"My son didn't use drugs. Why does she keep saying this Charlie? Who is Charlie? There ain't no Charlie. She's Charlie."

Newton's new attorney, David Dow, asked Governor Perry for a 30-day stay to prove that she was wrongly linked to the murder weapon. The Supreme Court of the United States declined without dissent two appeals on September 13.

== Execution ==
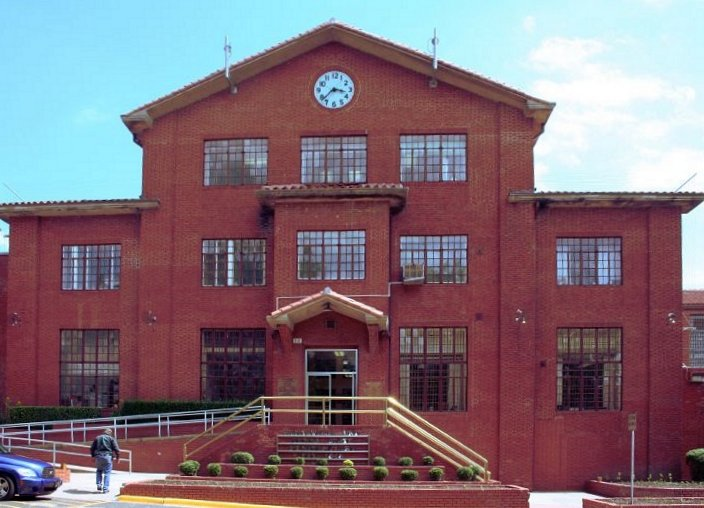
Huntsville Unit, where Newton was executed

The execution was carried out as scheduled on September 14, 2005, by lethal injection. Newton spent just over 17 1/2 years on death row before her execution, and was the third woman executed in Texas since the resumption of capital punishment in the state in 1982. The first and second were Karla Faye Tucker and Betty Lou Beets. Like Beets before her, Newton made no final statement and did not have a last meal request.

Newton's story was featured in the Fatal Attraction episode, "A Lethal Love". It has also been featured on Deadly Women.

== See also ==
- List of people executed in Texas, 2000–2009
- List of people executed in the United States in 2005
- List of women executed in the United States since 1976

== General references ==
- "Texas Woman Faces Execution Despite Questions Regarding Her Guilt". Death Penalty Information Center. 2010. Archived from the original on 2006-03-03.
- "Without Evidence: Executing Frances Newton". Austin Chronicle. September 9, 2005.
- Report from National Coalition to Abolish the Death Penalty
- Report from Texas Moratorium Network
- Last Statement. Texas Department of Criminal Justice. Retrieved on 2007-11-15.
- Frances Elaine Newton. The Clark County Prosecuting Attorney. Retrieved on 2007-11-15.
