= Kimberly McCarthy =

American murderer (1961–2013)

- Born: May 11, 1961; Greenville, Texas, U.S.
- Died: June 26, 2013 (aged 52); Huntsville Unit, Texas, U.S.
- Occupations: Occupational therapist, home health aide
- Spouse: Aaron Michaels (1993–1996; divorced)
- Children: 1
- Status: Executed by lethal injection
- Motive: To support her cocaine addiction
- Conviction: Capital murder
- Penalty: Death (November 24, 1998 & November 1, 2002)

Details
- Victims: 3
- Span of crimes: 1988–1997
- State: Texas
- Date apprehended: July 21, 1997

Kimberly LaGayle McCarthy (May 11, 1961 – June 26, 2013) was an American death row inmate and serial killer who was convicted and sentenced to death for the 1997 murder of her neighbor, 71-year-old retired college professor Dorothy Booth, in her Lancaster, Texas (Dallas–Fort Worth area) home during a robbery. Blood DNA evidence conclusively linked her to the murders of two other elderly Texas women, for which she was never tried.

After her final federal appeal was denied in July 2012, McCarthy's execution date was set for January 29, 2013. Two reprieves pushed her execution date to June 26, 2013. McCarthy continued to proclaim her innocence, saying she was framed for the murder.

On June 26, 2013, McCarthy was executed by the state of Texas by lethal injection, becoming the 500th person to be executed by the state of Texas by that method.

== Early life ==
McCarthy was born on May 11, 1961, in Greenville, Texas. She worked as an occupational therapist in a nursing home. She was briefly married to Aaron Michaels, with whom she had one son. During her adult life, she developed an addiction to crack cocaine. In 1990, she was convicted of forgery, and also had convictions for prostitution and theft of services.

== Crimes ==
On July 21, 1997, McCarthy reportedly called her neighbor, former El Centro College psychology professor Dorothy Booth (May 14, 1926 – July 21, 1997), saying that she was on her way over to borrow some sugar. Prosecutors later alleged that McCarthy's true intent was to rob Booth. After McCarthy arrived at Booth's home, she stabbed Booth five times with a butcher knife, beat her with a candelabrum, and cut off her finger to steal her diamond wedding ring. McCarthy then stole Booth's purse and Mercedes-Benz and pawned the diamond ring in order to buy crack cocaine.

The day after Booth's murder, McCarthy was charged with murder. Evidence showed that McCarthy used Booth's credit cards at a liquor store and was in possession of Booth's driver's license. Booth's DNA was also found on the murder weapon, which police recovered from McCarthy's home.

In 1998, McCarthy was convicted by a Dallas County, Texas jury of murdering Booth. During the sentencing hearing, prosecutors presented blood DNA evidence linking McCarthy to the murders of two other elderly women in Dallas County in December 1988, 81-year-old Maggie Harding and 85-year-old Jettie Lucas, in order to purchase cocaine. McCarthy was never charged with those murders, though the DNA evidence was conclusive enough for the cases to be considered solved. On November 24, 1998, McCarthy was sentenced to die by lethal injection for killing Booth.

McCarthy successfully appealed her conviction in 2001, but was later re-tried and re-sentenced to death on November 1, 2002.

== Execution dates ==
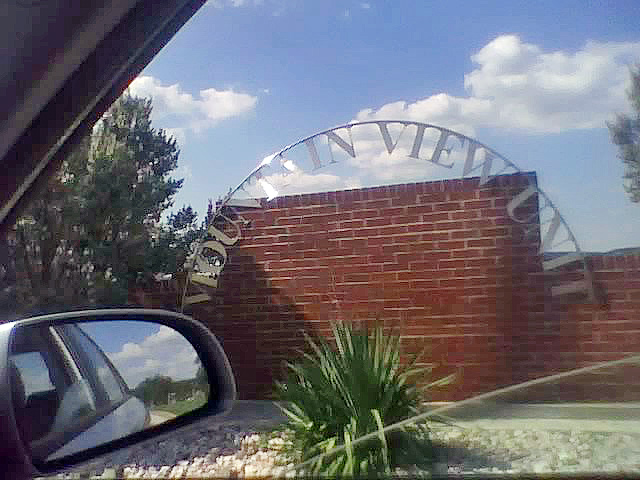
Mountain View Unit, where McCarthy was held on death row

McCarthy's final federal appeal was denied in July 2012. Her attorneys filed a petition for a writ of certiorari to the United States Supreme Court, and it was denied in January 2013. Her execution date was initially set for January 29, 2013. Only hours before her lethal injection was scheduled to occur, she was granted a stay of execution. Her execution was next set for April 3, 2013. In late March, the Dallas County district attorney announced that the date had been moved to June 26, 2013.

== Death ==
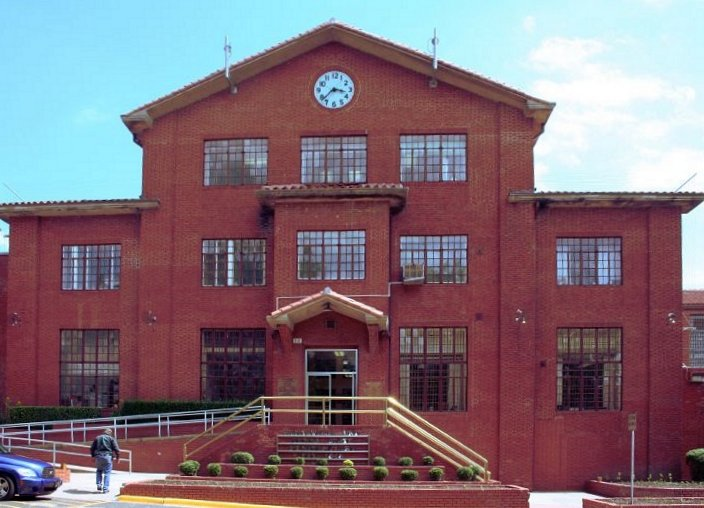
Huntsville Unit, where McCarthy was executed

McCarthy was executed by lethal injection at the Huntsville Unit in Huntsville, Texas, on June 26, 2013. Her execution marked the 500th convicted killer to be executed by lethal injection in Texas (which averages one execution about every four weeks) since the death penalty resumed in the United States in 1976. She was the first woman executed in the United States in almost three years.

She was pronounced dead at 6:37 p.m. CDT, 20 minutes after Texas prison officials began administering a single lethal dose of pentobarbital. Her last words were: "This is not a loss. This is a win. You know where I'm going. I'm going home to be with Jesus. Keep the faith. I love you all."

She is buried at Captain Joe Byrd Cemetery.

== See also ==
- Dorothy Williams (serial killer)
- List of people executed in Texas, 2010–2019
- List of people executed in the United States in 2013
- List of serial killers in the United States
- List of women executed in the United States since 1976

Executions carried out in Texas
Preceded by Elroy Chester June 12, 2013	Kimberly LaGayle McCarthy; June 26, 2013	Succeeded by John Manuel Quintanilla Jr. July 16, 2013
Executions carried out in the United States
Preceded by Brian Darrell Davis – Oklahoma June 25, 2013	Kimberly LaGayle McCarthy – Texas; June 26, 2013	Succeeded by John Manuel Quintanilla Jr. – Texas July 16, 2013
Women executed in the United States
Preceded by Teresa Wilson Bean Lewis – Virginia September 23, 2010	Kimberly LaGayle McCarthy – Texas; June 26, 2013	Succeeded by Suzanne Margaret Basso – Texas February 5, 2014
