= Maternal instinct =

Maternal instinct may refer to:

- The maternal bond that forms between a mother and her child
- "Maternal Instinct" (Stargate SG-1), a 2000 episode from the American-Canadian TV series Stargate SG-1
- "Maternal Instinct" (Danny Phantom), an episode of the American animated television series Danny Phantom
- Maternal Instinct (film), an American documentary film on the Murder of Reagan Simmons-Hancock
