= Christina Marie Riggs =

American murderer (1971–2000)

- Born: September 2, 1971; Lawton, Oklahoma, U.S.
- Died: May 2, 2000 (aged 28); Cummins Unit, Arkansas, U.S.
- Occupation: Licensed practical nurse
- Status: Executed by lethal injection
- Conviction: Capital murder (2 counts)
- Penalty: Death (June 30, 1998)

Details
- Victims: Justin Dalton Thomas, 5 Shelby Alexis Riggs, 2
- Date: November 4, 1997
- Country: United States
- State: Arkansas

Christina Marie Riggs (September 2, 1971 – May 2, 2000) was an American convicted murderer and a former licensed practical nurse, who was executed in Varner, Arkansas for the 1997 murders of her two children, Justin Dalton Thomas (1992 - 1997), age 5, and Shelby Alexis Riggs (1994-1997), age 2.

On November 4, 1997, Riggs sedated her children and planned to kill them with an injection of drugs she had obtained from her workplace. After the injection did not kill her son, she smothered both children to death and then attempted to die by suicide.

Defense attorneys initially stated that Riggs suffered from post‑traumatic stress disorder after working as medical first responder to 1995 Oklahoma City Bombing, however the Veterans Administration Hospital where she was employed from 1990 to 1995, confirmed that Riggs was not dispatched to the scene. Her attorneys did not present this as a defense at trial. Riggs waived her right to appeal and volunteered execution, which was carried out by lethal injection on May 2, 2000, occurring less than two years after her conviction on two counts of capital murder.

Riggs was the first woman executed in Arkansas since 1845. At the age of 28, Riggs was the "fifth woman executed in the United States since the Supreme Court lifted the ban on capital punishment in 1976."

Riggs remains the youngest woman to be executed in the modern era in the United States.

== Early life ==
Riggs was born in Lawton, Oklahoma, and grew up in Oklahoma City. She stated that she was sexually abused as a child and began using alcohol, tobacco, and marijuana by age fourteen. She became pregnant at sixteen and placed the child for adoption. After finishing high school, she became a licensed practical nurse and worked in home health care and at a Veterans Administration hospital.

Riggs became pregnant with her son Justin in 1991. The child's father was not involved in their lives, but before Justin was born in June 1992, she began dating Jon Riggs. Christina and Jon married in 1993 and had a daughter, Shelby, in December 1994. The family moved to Sherwood, Arkansas, in 1995, where her mother lived, and Riggs obtained a job at Baptist Hospital. Christina and Jon later divorced after she said he struck Justin in the stomach.

== Murders ==
Riggs killed her children in their beds at the family's home in Sherwood. She had planned to give them a combination of potassium chloride, amitriptyline, and morphine, obtaining the amitriptyline from a local pharmacy and taking the other drugs from the hospital where she worked.

Riggs injected the potassium chloride into Justin first, but the undiluted drug caused pain rather than killing him. She injected Justin with morphine, she said, to ease his pain. When it had no effect, she smothered him. She then smothered her daughter, Shelby, without injecting her, after witnessing the pain the potassium had caused Justin.

Riggs placed the dead children on her bed, covered them with a blanket, and wrote suicide notes. She then attempted suicide by taking a large quantity of amitriptyline and injecting herself with undiluted potassium chloride. Nineteen hours later, her mother found her unconscious on the floor of her home.

== Trial and conviction ==
At her June 1998 trial, prosecutors argued that Riggs saw her children as an "inconvenience". Her defense attorneys presented expert medical witnesses who testified that Riggs, due to failed relationships, low self-esteem due to obesity, and sexual abuse she had experienced as child, had become severely depressed. A Pulaski County jury convicted her on two counts of capital murder. During the sentencing phase, she prevented her attorneys from presenting a defense, stating that she wanted to be executed. She later convinced the court to allow her to drop her appeals.

Riggs was held at the McPherson Unit, which included the female death row, until her execution. The Arkansas execution chamber is located at the Cummins Unit.

== Execution ==
On Sunday, April 30, 2000, Riggs was flown from McPherson to Cummins in preparation for her execution. She was executed at 9:28 p.m. Central Daylight Time on May 2, 2000. Riggs was the fifth woman executed in the United States since the death penalty was reinstated in 1976 and the first woman executed in Arkansas since 1845. Her statement before execution began: "No words can express just how sorry I am for taking the lives of my babies. No way I can make up for or take away the pain I have caused everyone who knew and loved them." Her final words were, "I love you, my babies." Riggs was executed with a potassium chloride injection.

== See also ==
- Capital punishment in Arkansas
- Capital punishment in the United States
- List of people executed in Arkansas
- List of people executed in the United States in 2000
- List of women executed in the United States since 1976
- Volunteer (capital punishment)

Executions carried out in Arkansas
Preceded by Alan Willett September 8, 1999	Christina Marie Riggs; May 2, 2000	Succeeded by David Dewayne Johnson December 19, 2000
Executions carried out in the United States
Preceded by Ronald Boyd – Oklahoma April 27, 2000	Christina Marie Riggs – Arkansas; May 2, 2000	Succeeded by Tommy Jackson – Texas May 4, 2000
Women executed in the United States
Preceded by Betty Lou Beets – Texas February 24, 2000	Christina Marie Riggs – Arkansas; May 2, 2000	Succeeded by Wanda Jean Allen – Oklahoma January 11, 2001
