= Brittany Holberg =

American convicted murderer (born 1973)

- Mug shot of Holberg, 1998
- Born: Brittany Marlowe Holberg; January 1, 1973 (age 53); Amarillo, Texas, U.S.
- Occupation: Escort
- Children: 1
- Status: Incarcerated
- Conviction: Capital murder
- Penalty: Death

Details
- Imprisoned at: Patrick O'Daniel Unit

Brittany Marlowe Holberg (born January 1, 1973) is an American woman on death row in the U.S. state of Texas. On Friday, March 27, 1998, Holberg was convicted of the November 1996 robbery, torture and murder of 80-year-old A. B. Towery Sr. in his southwest Amarillo home, although she claimed self-defense.

== Murder case ==
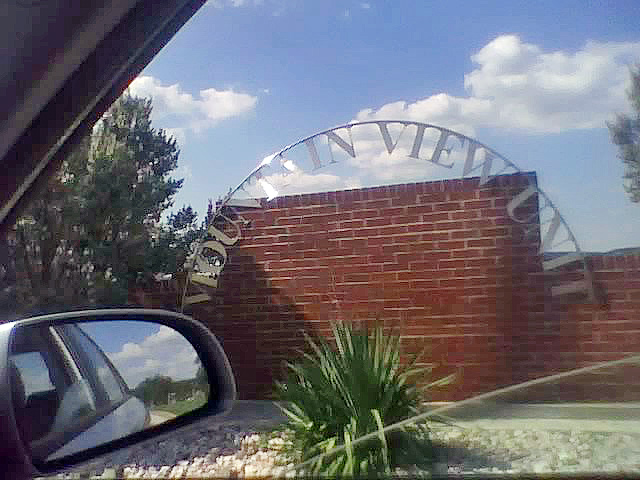
Patrick O'Daniel Unit (then Mountain View Unit), where Holberg is held

Holberg killed A.B. Towery on November 13, 1996, after a fight. According to Holberg, Towery had been paying her for sex for several years prior. On the day of the murder, Holberg testified, Towery had attacked her with a frying pan after discovering her smoking drugs in his apartment. She claimed to have struggled with him for several minutes until he pulled out strands of her hair, at which point she "lost it" and stabbed him several times before shoving a brass pole down his throat. Prosecutors claimed that Holberg had killed Towery in order to steal his money and prescription drugs, which made the murder a capital offence. Evidence of this theory included Towery's wallet, which was found open at the crime scene, and the testimony of two witnesses who had seen her counting money in the aftermath of the killing.

After killing Towery, Holberg fled to Tennessee. She was arrested in Memphis in February 1997 and extradited back to Texas. At her trial, Vickie Kirkpatrick, a confidential informant for the Amarillo Police Department, testified Holberg had admitted to her that she had murdered Towery in order to steal from him. She claimed Holberg had described the killing as "fun and amazing", and had expressed a willingness to kill again. Kirkpatrick later recanted her testimony in 2011, claiming that prosecutors had coerced her into testifying against Holberg by threatening her with a pending burglary case. Holberg was found guilty of murder in the commission of a robbery and sentenced to death. One of Towery's sons later recalled that he had smuggled a gun into the courtroom in order to kill Holberg during the trial, but had changed his mind at the last second.

Holberg filed an appeal in the Court of Criminal Appeals of Texas, but on November 29, 2000, the appeals court upheld the decision of the trial court.

In 2015, James Farren, the district attorney of Randall County, stated that due to the legal complications involving the Holberg case and the resulting legal expenses—he estimated the cost was about $400,000—and time expended, he would pursue life imprisonment without parole for future capital murder cases unless there were exceptional circumstances.

In March 2025, the United States Court of Appeals for the Fifth Circuit overturned Holberg's conviction after they found that the prosecution had not disclosed Kirkpatrick's status as a paid informant during the trial, which they concluded was a violation of Holberg's due process rights. Circuit judge Kyle Duncan dissented from the majority's ruling, writing that the conviction was not based solely on Kirkpatrick's testimony. Duncan stated that the physical evidence alone would have been sufficient to disprove Holberg's claim of self-defense. Holberg's case was referred back to the trial court for further proceedings. However, in July 2025 the Fifth Circuit reversed its prior ruling and granted a motion by the state for rehearing en banc, meaning that Holberg's conviction was reinstated and the appeal argued again before the full court. The rehearing occurred on January 21, 2026. Holberg's defense argued that Kirkpatrick's testimony was the only evidence of her alleged sadism and her intent to rob Towery, and thus she should not qualify for the death penalty. They also argued that Holberg's trial attorney had failed to present mitigating evidence such as her family history of mental illness. In response, the prosecution stated that Towery's extensive injuries indicated a degree of sadism, and Holberg herself had discussed the mitigating circumstances when she testified at the trial. On August 14, 2026, an equally divided Fifth Circuit upheld Holberg's conviction and death sentence.

== Personal life ==
Holberg has spoken out about the death penalty, abuse in the Texas Department of Criminal Justice, and the need for better prison conditions. In a 2001 letter written to the Canadian Coalition Against the Death Penalty, Holberg said,

Just two weeks ago, we were informed that not only would we be strip-searched for our one hour of recreation a day, but also when taken for a shower. So for the last two weeks, we have been stripped no less than six times a day, and our cells have been completely ransacked. This is every day, sometimes at times like 2:30 and 3 am, and we never leave the building - or our cells for that matter.

She has also written on behalf of other prisoners, such as a 62-year-old murderer named Betty Lou Beets.

In 2003, Holberg was interviewed by Ms. magazine about her life. She had married as a teenager and in 1993 gave birth to a daughter. At the age of 20, Holberg moved back to Amarillo, her hometown, and subsequently fell in with a bad crowd. In a Dallas Morning News account, Holberg was described as a woman who was exposed to drugs at home when she was 13 or 14 years old, and had married before she completed high school. After the dissolution of her marriage, she became addicted to drugs and confessed to scamming prescription medication from dentists with her aunt. Holberg was caught with drugs and was released from state custody after completion of a substance-abuse felony punishment program on September 1, 1996. Holberg had also once been gang raped, severely beaten, and cut with a knife; she was hospitalized after the incident.

Holberg's was mentioned in a January 2007 Maxim magazine article titled "Babes Behaving Badly", which featured 10 women convicted of crimes. Holberg is one of seven women on death row in Texas as of December 2023.

== See also ==
- List of death row inmates in the United States
- List of women on death row in the United States
