= Patrick O'Daniel Unit =

Women's prison in Gatesville, Texas, U.S.

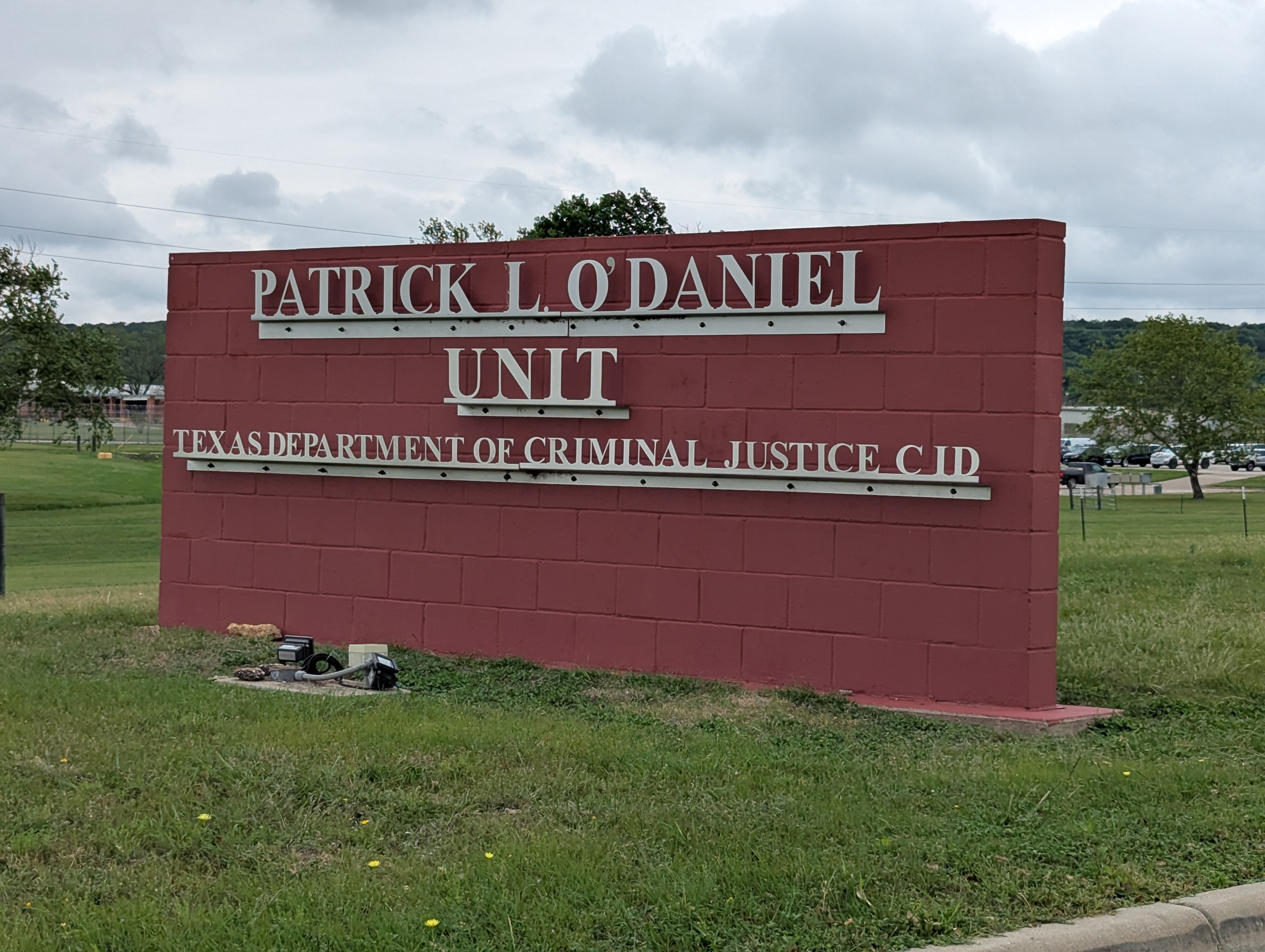

- Location in Texas
- Location: 2305 Ransom Road Gatesville, Texas 76528; 31°29′14″N 97°43′40″W
- Status: Operational
- Security class: G1-G5, Administrative Segregation, Death row
- Capacity: 645
- Opened: July 1975
- Managed by: TDCJ Correctional Institutions Division
- Warden: Andrea Lozada
- Website: tdcj.state.tx.us/unit_directory/mv.html

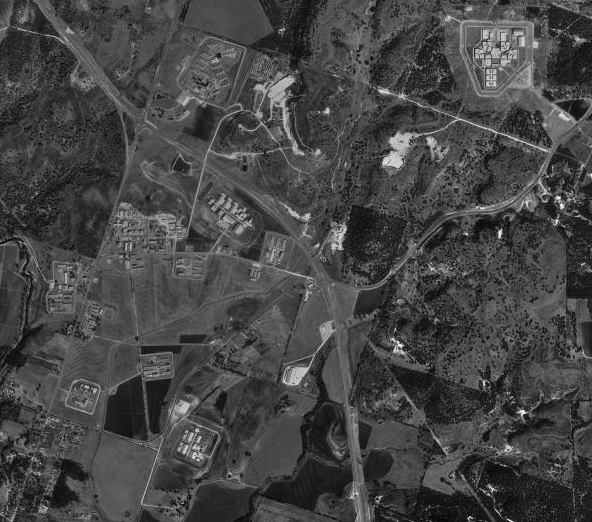
Aerial photograph of the prisons in Gatesville, January 13, 1996, United States Geological Survey

Patrick L. O'Daniel Unit (formerly the Mountain View Unit) is a Texas Department of Criminal Justice prison housing female offenders in Gatesville, Texas. The unit, with about 97 acres (39 ha) of land, is located 4 miles (6.4 km) north of central Gatesville on Farm to Market Road 215. The prison is located in a 45-minute driving distance from Waco. In addition to its other functions, O'Daniel Unit houses the state's female death row inmates.

Death row offenders are housed separately from the rest of the prisoners in single-person cells measuring 60 square feet (5.6 m^{2}), with each cell having a window. They do not have recreation individually. Some are allowed to watch television, though this is dependent upon agreeing to work for free, and all have a radio.

While O'Daniel functions as the women's death row, executions take place in the Huntsville Unit. Karla Faye Tucker, executed February 3, 1998, was the first woman to be executed in Texas since 1863. The most recent female to be executed was Lisa Coleman, executed on September 17, 2014.

Notable inmates at O'Daniel include Kimberly Clark Saenz, Erica Sheppard, Yolanda Saldívar, Linda Carty, Brittany Holberg, Darlie Routier and Taylor Rene Parker. As of October 11, 2019, Amber Guyger, the former Dallas Police Department officer convicted of the murder of Botham Jean, was serving her sentence at the facility.

As of 2004, the facility did not have a sign on the area main highway.

== History ==
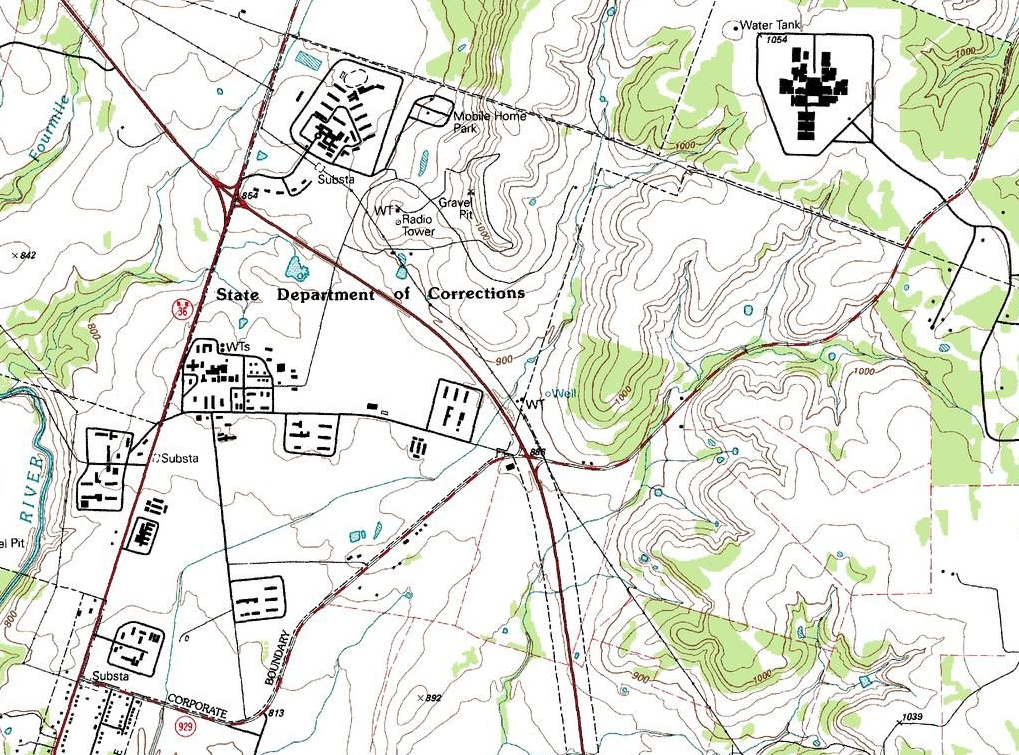
Topographical map of the Gatesville prison units (Mountain View, Christina Crain, Hilltop, and Hughes), United States Geological Survey, 1994

The Mountain View State School closed in 1975, and its boys were sent to other facilities. The Texas Department of Criminal Justice bought the land and buildings. The facility reopened as a women's prison. The then named Mountain View Unit opened in July 1975. In 2023, the prison was renamed the Patrick O'Daniel Unit following a unanimous vote from the Texas Board of Criminal Justice the previous December. The prison was renamed to honor a former Texas Board of Criminal Justice chairman, who served that position from 2020 to 2023.

In 2025 Lawrence Wright of The New Yorker wrote that the former name was from "the modest green hills on the horizon."

== Operation ==
The prison may hold up to 645 inmates. Ruth Hill of The Observer described the unit as "intimidating", saying that the "bunker-like buildings are punctuated with slit windows and wreathed in wire, with guard towers on every corner". In regard to the prison's former name, Hill stated, "But there is no mountain, and from the prison's death row, there is no view".

Around 2001, several inmates at O'Daniel were in a Windham School District effort to translate textbooks into braille. These books are intended for Texas schoolchildren and college and university students. Kevin VonRosenberg, one of the coordinators of the braille program, stated in 2014 that it is a very sought-after inmate positions. Prisoners learn how to use a Perkins Brailler, then use computers to do actual work. The program was established in 1999. This is one of the largest braille programs within an American prison.

=== Death row ===
The women's death row is located in a red-brick, one-story building that first opened in 1985 to house psychiatric patients. The female death-row and psychiatric patients together occupy the same building. Plans to renovate the building first occurred in 1995 and renovation began in early 2000. The renovation cost was $95,000.

The building has a day room and a work area along with two rows of cells, with six cells each. One row is designated for women punished in administrative segregation and/or those who do not wish to work, and another row is for women who wish to work. Each cell is 14 by 6 feet (4.3 by 1.8 m). The doors use traditional bars, unlike the men's death row at the Polunsky Unit near Livingston, Texas. The building is air conditioned, since it also houses a psychiatric unit. Amy Dorsett of the San Antonio Express-News said that the facility has "gleaming white walls, sun-filled cells, and a decorative recreation room". Pam Baggett, the warden of O'Daniel, stated in 2000 that the new death row was less "homey" than the previous one.

From the early 1980s to 2000, condemned women were housed in an eight-cell building with an immediately adjacent, combined day room and work area. The communal area had a television and a center for making crafts. Mary Mapes, the author of Truth and Duty: The Press, the President, and the Privilege of Power, wrote that each cell was painted in bright colors and that the cells, which "could have been dorm rooms in a particularly austere college", had cots with "lacy touches", afghans, and "colorful pillows". She added that the death row in general had comfortable seating and was brightly colored.

As of 2004, the female death-row inmates may participate in a work program and have limited viewing of a television located outside of their cells. No television was available when the current death-row building first opened in 2000. Each death-row inmate may have limited association with the other inmates. The women on death row are permitted to knit and sew. As of the 1990s, they made dolls for sick children.

The death-row inmates use a 50-by-10-yard (45.7 by 9.1 m) recreation yard with basketball hoops, a tree, and a bench.

The women have programming that the men in the Polunsky Unit death row, as of 2015, do not have.

== Notable inmates ==
=== Death-row inmates ===
All inmates on this list are/were under death sentences from the State of Texas.

==== Executed ====
- Karla Faye Tucker—Executed on February 3, 1998
- Betty Lou Beets—Executed on February 24, 2000.
- Frances Newton—Executed on September 14, 2005
- Kimberly McCarthy—Executed on June 26, 2013
- Suzanne Basso—Executed on February 5, 2014
- Lisa Coleman—Executed on September 17, 2014

==== Awaiting execution ====
- Brittany Holberg—Conviction vacated in March, 2025
- Darlie Lynn Routier
- Kimberly Cargill
- Linda Carty
- Erica Yvonne Sheppard
- Taylor Rene Parker

==== Stay of execution ====
- Melissa Lucio

=== Non-death row inmates ===
- Yolanda Saldívar
- Kimberly Trenor
- Diane Zamora Zamora is no longer housed at Mountain View. She has been relocated to the Dr. Lane Murray Unit, also in Gatesville.
- Christine Paolilla
- Kimberly Clark Saenz
- Amber Guyger

== See also ==
- Capital punishment in Texas
