= Suzanne Basso =

American criminal (1954–2014)

- Born: Suzanne Margaret Burns; May 15, 1954; Schenectady, New York, U.S.
- Died: February 5, 2014 (aged 59); Huntsville Unit, Texas, U.S.
- Other names: Suzanne Margaret Anne Cassandra Lynne Theresa Marie Veronica Sue Burns-Standlinslowski; Sue Peek; Suzanne O'Malley
- Occupations: Apartment complex security guard, seamstress
- Spouse: James O'Malley (born James David Peek)
- Children: 2
- Status: Executed by lethal injection
- Motive: Life insurance money
- Conviction: Capital murder (August 27, 1999)
- Penalty: Death (October 28, 1999)
- Accomplice: Carmine Basso (cohabiting boyfriend)

Details
- Victims: 1
- Date: August 25, 1998

Suzanne Margaret "Sue" Basso (née Burns; May 15, 1954 – February 5, 2014) was an American woman who was one of six co-defendants convicted in the August 1998 torture and murder of 59 year-old Louis "Buddy" Musso, a mentally disabled man who was killed for his life insurance money. She was sentenced to death in October 1999. Basso was executed by lethal injection on February 5, 2014. Prior to her execution, Basso had been held at the Mountain View Unit (now Patrick O'Daniel Unit) in Gatesville, Texas, where all of the state's female death row inmates are incarcerated. At the time of the crime, Basso lived in Jacinto City, Texas, a Houston suburb.

== Background ==
Suzanne Margaret Burns was born on May 15, 1954, to a family from Schenectady, New York. She was one of eight children born to Florence (née Garrow) and John Richard Burns. Her mother was the elder sister of spree killer and rapist Robert Garrow. Burns was the youngest of three girls in the family. She was physically and sexually abused as a child. One story among the family is that when Florence caught her daughter with a pack of cigarettes, instead of making her smoke them, she made her eat them.

Burns married a Marine named James Peek in the early 1970s. The Peeks had two children: a daughter born in 1973 and a son was born in 1974. James Peek was arrested in 1982 for molesting his daughter and was convicted of taking indecent liberties with a child. In the early 1990s, the couple and the children moved into a residence in Houston. The family changed their surname to "O'Malley" and adopted an Irish-American identity. While in Houston she sometimes worked as a security guard in an apartment complex.

In 1993, Peek became romantically involved with a New Jersey man named Carmine Basso, who owned a company called Latin Security and Investigations Corp. She never divorced Peek, so was unable to marry Basso, who moved into her residence. Peek stayed in the house for a period before moving to another residence in Houston. Despite being unable to marry Basso, she changed her surname to "Basso" and began referring to Carmine as her husband. He died in 1997.

== Victim ==
Louis Charles "Buddy" Musso had been married previously and had a son with his wife, who died of cancer in 1980. In 1997, Musso was living in an assisted living house in Cliffside Park, New Jersey, near New York City, and worked as a bagger at a ShopRite store. At age 58, he met Suzanne Basso, who was 43 at the time, at a church bazaar near his house. They started a long-distance relationship and he planned to move to Texas with Basso. He moved to the Houston area on June 14, 1998.

== Murder ==
Musso's murder took place 16 days after his arrival at the Basso residence. The perpetrators included Basso; her son James O'Malley; Bernice Ahrens Miller and her children, Craig and Hope Ahrens; and Hope's fiancé, Terence Singleton. The perpetrators forced Musso to do chores for them and he had injuries before his murder took place. According to O'Malley, Musso was killed at Miller's apartment, where he was beaten and burned with cigarettes as he sat on a child's play mat. The group also used a wire brush on him, then put him in a bathtub that was filled with kitchen cleaner and bleach. They put clothes on Musso's body before leaving him in Galena Park, Texas. A jogger found the body and called police. The Galena Park Police Department ruled that Musso's death was due to "multiple blunt impact trauma."

== Trial, sentencing, and death ==
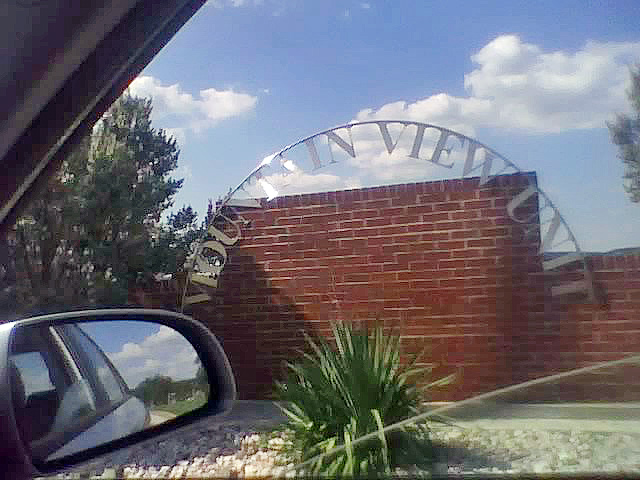
Mountain View Unit, where Basso was held

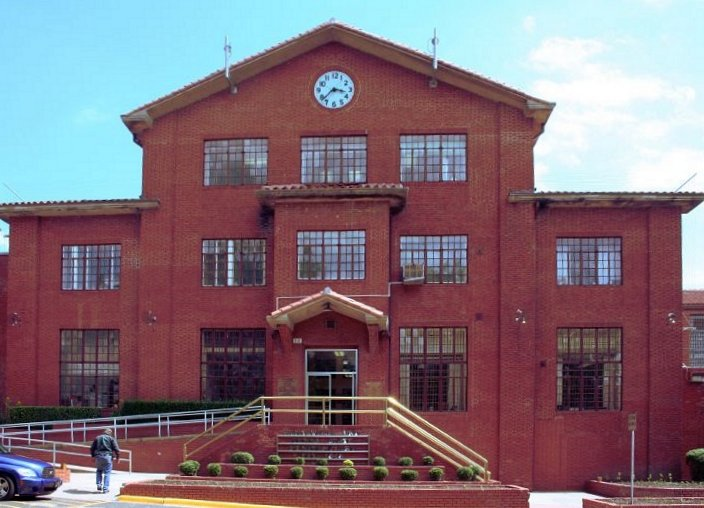
Huntsville Unit, the site of her execution

Mary Lou Keel, a Texas district judge, established that most of the suspects would get individual trials. The prosecutors were Colleen Barnett and Denise Nassar. The trial of O'Malley was scheduled to begin on April 13, 1999. Craig Ahrens' trial was scheduled to begin later that month. Miller and Singleton were to be tried together during a trial beginning in May. The trial for Hope Ahrens was scheduled for June. The final trial, that of Basso, was scheduled for July.

O'Malley was convicted of capital murder and received a life sentence. Miller was convicted of murder and received 80 years in prison. Craig Ahrens was convicted of murder and received 60 years in prison. Singleton was convicted of capital murder and received a life sentence. The trial of Hope Ahrens resulted in a hung jury, but she took a plea deal in exchange for testifying against Basso. She received a 20-year sentence and has since been released from prison. Suzanne Basso was convicted and sentenced to death. Basso was held at the Texas Department of Criminal Justice (TDCJ) Mountain View Unit (now Patrick O'Daniel Unit) in Gatesville while on death row.

Since Texas no longer serves last meal requests on death row, Basso ate regular prison fare of baked chicken, fish, boiled eggs, carrots, green beans, and sliced bread. She was executed on February 5, 2014, at the Huntsville Unit of the TDCJ. When asked if she had a last statement, she replied to the prison warden, "No, sir." She was pronounced dead at 6:26 p.m. CST, 11 minutes after a lethal dose of the drug pentobarbital was administered.

As of 2015, the other perpetrators are incarcerated at these prisons:

- James O'Malley: Hodge Unit
- Bernice Ahrens: Hobby Unit
- Craig Ahrens: Ferguson Unit
- Hope Ahrens: Lockhart Unit
- Terence Singleton: Ferguson Unit

== See also ==
- Capital punishment in Texas
- List of people executed in Texas, 2010–2019
- List of people executed in the United States in 2014
- List of women executed in the United States since 1976

Executions carried out in Texas
Preceded by Edgar Tamayo Arias January 22, 2014	Suzanne Basso; February 5, 2014	Succeeded by Ray L. Jasper III March 19, 2014
Executions carried out in the United States
Preceded by Herbert L. Smulls – Missouri January 29, 2014	Suzanne Basso – Texas; February 5, 2014	Succeeded by Juan Carlos Chavez – Florida February 12, 2014
Women executed in the United States
Preceded by Kimberly McCarthy – Texas June 26, 2013	Suzanne Basso – Texas; February 5, 2014	Succeeded by Lisa Ann Colman – Texas September 17, 2014
