= Prison cemetery =

Type of cemetery

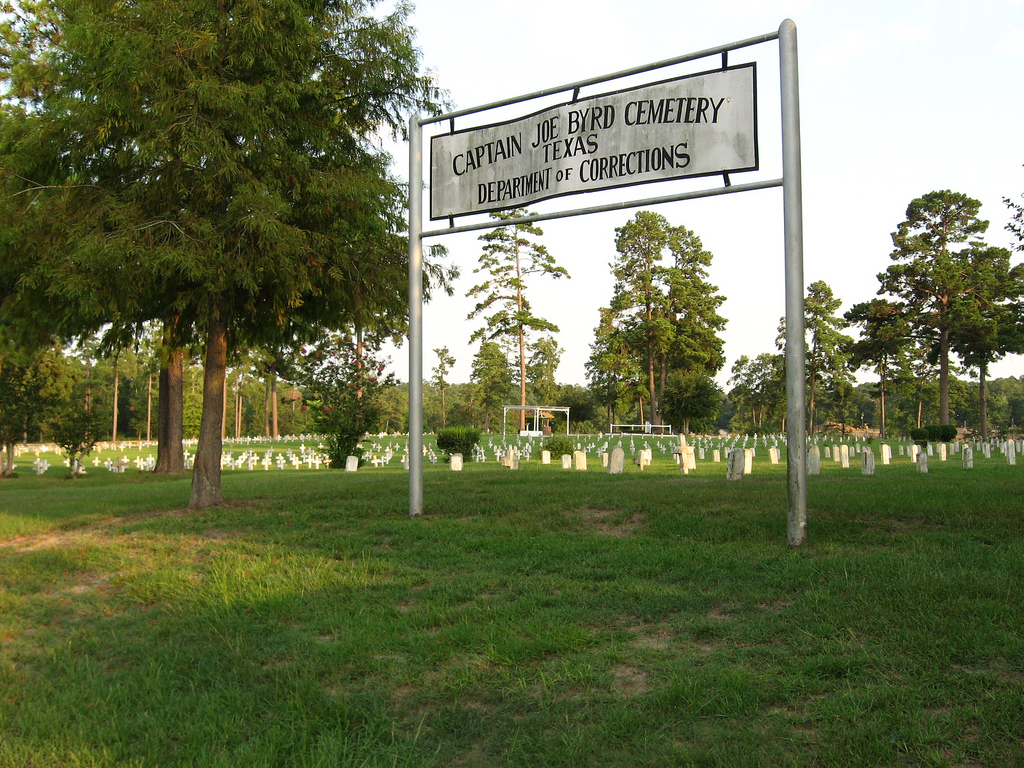
Captain Joe Byrd Cemetery in Huntsville, Texas, the Texas Department of Criminal Justice prison cemetery for deceased prisoners who are not reclaimed by their families

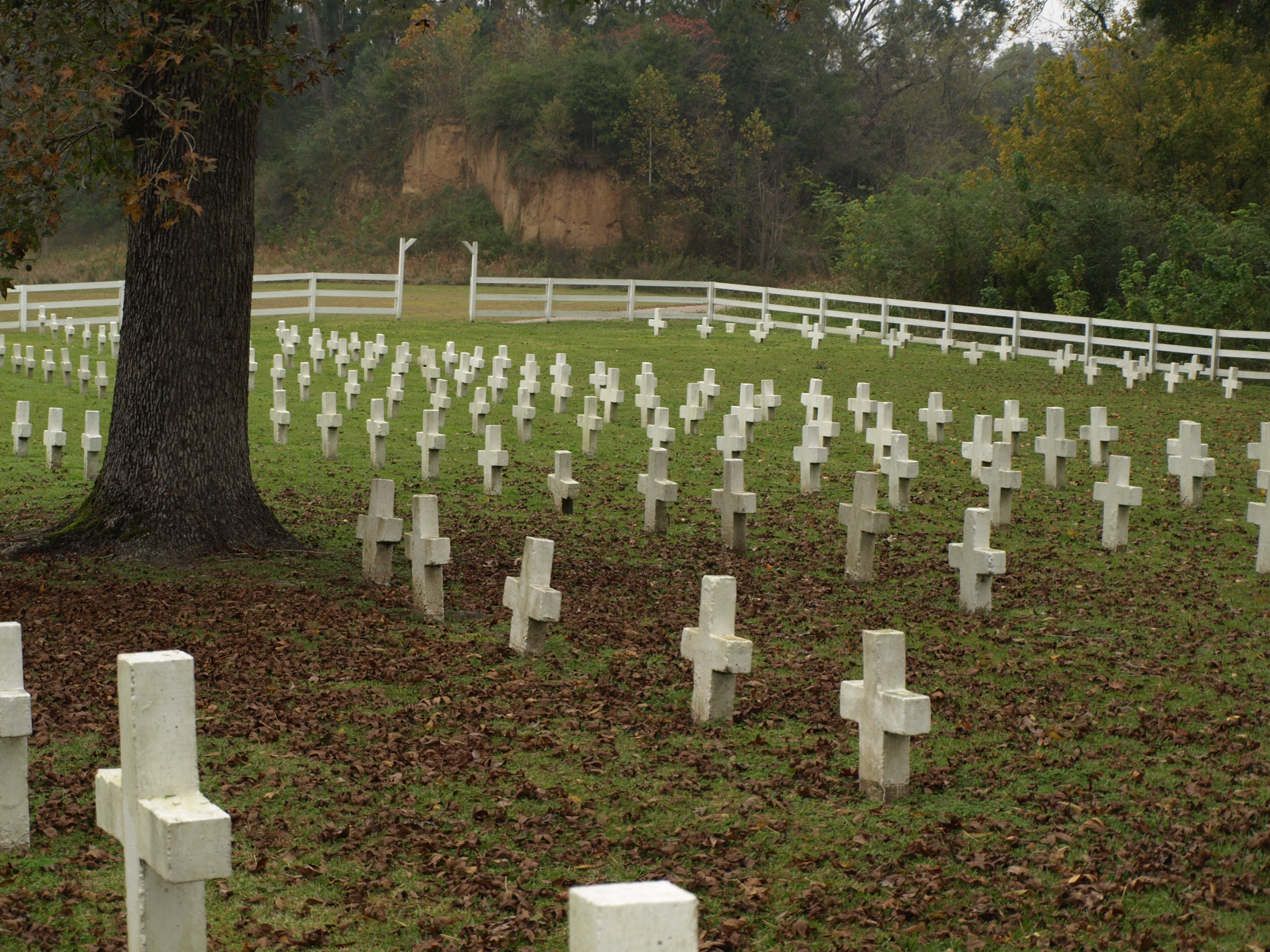
The original Point Lookout Cemetery, one of the prison cemeteries on the property of the Louisiana State Penitentiary in West Feliciana Parish, Louisiana

A prison cemetery is a graveyard reserved for the dead bodies of prisoners. Generally, the remains of inmates who are not claimed by family or friends are interred in prison cemeteries and include convicts executed for capital crimes.

== List of prison cemeteries ==
- United States
  - Florida
    - Union Correctional Institution, Raiford
  - Idaho
    - Old Idaho State Penitentiary, Boise
  - Kansas
    - Fort Leavenworth Military Prison Cemetery
  - Louisiana
    - Point Lookout Cemetery and Point Lookout II, Louisiana State Penitentiary (Angola), West Feliciana Parish
    - One cemetery at the Elayn Hunt Correctional Center, St. Gabriel
  - Mississippi
    - Two cemeteries, Mississippi State Penitentiary (Parchman), Sunflower County, Mississippi
  - South Carolina
    - State Cemetery, a.k.a. Penitentiary Cemetery (nicknamed "Tickleberry"), Central Correctional Institution (Columbia), Richland County, South Carolina
  - Texas
    - Captain Joe Byrd Cemetery, Huntsville (the unclaimed remains of inmates who were executed for capital murder are buried here, but the cemetery also includes the remains of non-executed inmates)
    - One cemetery, Clemens Unit, Brazoria County, Texas
    - Imperial State Farm Cemetery, Central Unit, Sugar Land
    - Gatesville State School, Gatesville
