= Kimberly Cargill =

American murderer on death row in Texas

- Born: Kimberly Diane Cargill; November 30, 1966 (age 59); Jones County, Mississippi, U.S.
- Status: Incarcerated on death row
- Motive: To prevent the victim from testifying against her in a child protection case
- Conviction: Capital murder
- Penalty: Death by lethal injection (2012)

Details
- Victims: Cherry Walker, 39
- Date: June 18, 2010
- Location: Texas
- Imprisoned at: Patrick O'Daniel Unit

Kimberly Diane Cargill (born November 30, 1966) is an American convicted murderer sentenced to death in Texas for the murder of Cherry Walker, her son's mentally-challenged babysitter. On June 18, 2010, Cargill killed 39-year-old Cherry Walker by asphyxiation to prevent the victim from testifying against her in a child protective case. Cargill had a history of abusing her children, and feared Walker's testimony would result in authorities taking her children permanently. After killing Cherry, Cargill badly burnt her body.

Cargill was arrested and charged with capital murder within a month after the crime. Although Cargill claimed Walker had died from a seizure and not due to homicidal violence, the jury found Cargill guilty of capital murder and sentenced her to death in 2012. As of 2026, Cargill is on death row at the Patrick O'Daniel Unit, with her execution date yet to be scheduled.

== Personal life ==
Kimberly Diane Cargill was born in Mississippi on November 30, 1966. A psychiatric report indicated Cargill had been sexually molested by a family member at the age of 11. As an adult, Cargill was married three times and had four sons. Cargill divorced her first husband in December 1995. Her second marriage lasted from June 1996 until the early 2000s. Cargill married for the third time in 2005; this marriage also ended in divorce.

According to Cargill's children and three ex-husbands, she was often abusive toward them. Cargill's third husband, with whom Cargill had her fourth son, said he witnessed Cargill beat his young son from his first marriage on the face and knock the boy across the room, an incident which ultimately drove him to separate from and divorce Cargill. On another occasion, Cargill got upset with her third husband for eating some snacks, and they got into a fight that led to Cargill's third husband pushing her against the wall in self-defense; she later allegedly started a fire in his apartment. Cargill also abused her mother by choking her whenever she was upset and angry with her, and she allegedly did the same thing to two of her sons. She also regularly locked her sons in their rooms for hours.

== Murder of Cherry Walker ==
By 2010, Cargill had been placed under investigation by child protective services for child abuse allegations. In March 2010, Cargill's two younger sons, Luke and Zach, who were still in her custody, were removed and placed in the care of relatives. On May 18, 2010, Cargill failed to adhere to a voluntary agreement giving temporary custody of Luke to her mother, and did not return her son to her mother after retrieving him from day care. Cargill also faced a custody hearing on June 23, 2010.

On June 18, 2010, 39-year-old Cherry Walker (October 24, 1970 – June 18, 2010), the mentally-challenged babysitter of Cargill's son, was served with a subpoena to testify at the custody hearing. Having learned of the subpoena, Cargill wanted to stop Walker from showing up at the hearing to testify, fearing the testimony might cost her custody of her son. On the day Walker received the subpoena, Cargill met up with her, taking advantage of Walker's distress over the prospect of coming to court as a witness and told Walker that she would hide her to ensure she would not testify.

After bringing Walker out under the pretext of dinner, Cargill killed Walker by an unknown method of asphyxiation. After the murder, Cargill abandoned Walker's body on the side of a rural road, eight to ten miles from Walker's apartment. Cargill doused Walker's clothes with lighter fluid and lit it on fire, burning Walker's body before she left the scene.

Walker's body was found the next day, but took four days before she was identified. Within the same month, the police investigations identified Cargill as the prime suspect, and she was arrested and held in the Smith County Jail, where she was initially remanded for causing felony injury to a child. On July 31, 2010, Cargill was charged with capital murder, an offense that carries the death penalty under Texas state law.

== Death penalty trial ==
In October 2010, Kimberly Cargill was formally indicted by a Smith County grand jury for a charge of capital murder. In August 2011, Cargill's trial was set—initially for February 13, 2012. The prosecution announced a month prior that they would be seeking the death penalty.

On May 8, 2012, Cargill's trial for murdering Cherry Walker commenced before a Smith County jury. Cargill reportedly pleaded not guilty to the charges. Walker's family and friends reportedly appeared in court as trial witnesses.

In her defense, Cargill claimed she had not killed Walker. Cargill testified that on the day of the murder, the victim had a seizure and stopped breathing while they were driving near a hospital, and that she was unable to reach the hospital due to having made a wrong turn. Cargill claimed that she tried to give Walker CPR, but her efforts at resuscitation failed, and that out of panic, she decided to dispose of Walker's body by burning her corpse.

The trial also heard testimony from forensic and medical experts. Dr. Meredith Lann, the forensic pathologist who conducted an autopsy of Walker's corpse, testified that the cause of Walker's death was asphyxiation and that the pattern of her death was consistent with homicidal violence through unknown means. Furthermore, Walker's medical records showed that she had experienced several instances of seizures in the past, but none of them were severe or life-threatening.

On May 18, 2012, the jury found Cargill guilty of capital murder as charged. A sentencing trial was conducted throughout the rest of the month. One of the expert witnesses, Dr. Antoinette McGarahan, a forensic psychiatrist, testified that Cargill was diagnosed with borderline personality disorder with antisocial and narcissistic tendencies, and that despite her condition, she knew right from wrong when she murdered Walker. McGarahan also stated how other tests revealed that Cargill had normal cognitive functioning, average to bright intelligence at 114 intelligence quotient, and exhibited "moderate psychopathic characteristics", making her "chronically angry, hostile and very impulsive". Three of Cargill's four sons testified how Cargill would frequently choke, kick, and hit them, and also changed the locks on their bedroom doors so she could lock them inside. Cargill's ex-husbands also turned up in court to testify about her long-term history of abusing her sons and former spouses.

On May 31, 2012, the jury unanimously recommended the death penalty for Cargill. Reportedly, Walker's family stated that they did not hate Cargill but they hated her crime, and were relieved that the trial was over.

On June 7, 2012, Cargill was formally sentenced to death via lethal injection by Smith County Judge Jack Skeen.

== Appeal process ==
On October 21, 2014, Kimberly Cargill filed an appeal to the Texas Court of Criminal Appeals. On November 19, 2014, the Texas Court of Criminal Appeals dismissed Cargill's appeals against her death sentence and murder conviction.

On April 26, 2017, the Texas Court of Criminal Appeals rejected Cargill's second appeal against her death sentence.

On October 30, 2017, the U.S. Supreme Court dismissed Cargill's appeal. Cargill was one of four condemned prisoners from Texas to lose their appeals against their death sentences on that same day.

On June 17, 2020, the Texas Court of Criminal Appeals rejected Cargill's third appeal.

== Death row ==
Since the end of her sentencing, Kimberly Cargill was incarcerated on death row at the Patrick O'Daniel Unit, where the state's female death row was located. When Taylor Rene Parker was sentenced to death in 2022 for murdering her pregnant friend and abducting the victim's unborn baby, Cargill was reported to be one of seven female offenders (including Parker herself) held on death row in Texas as of 2022. A 2023 report revealed that Cargill was one of 18 individuals from East Texas to be held on death row for crimes committed within the region.

As of 2026, Cargill is on death row at the Patrick O'Daniel Unit, with her execution date yet to be scheduled.

== See also ==
- Capital punishment in Texas
- List of death row inmates in the United States § Texas
- List of women on death row in the United States § Texas
