= Henry Ray Clark =

American folk artist

- Born: October 12, 1936; Bartlett, Texas, United States
- Died: July 29, 2006 (aged 69); Ben Taub Hospital in Houston, Texas
- Known for: Folk Art, Prison Art

Henry Ray Clark (October 12, 1936 – July 29, 2006) was a folk artist born in Bartlett, Texas, and moved to Houston, where he became a criminal with the street name of "The Magnificent Pretty Boy". After a series of drug-dealing convictions he was found guilty of an assault, his third strike in the Texas Three Strikes Law, which sentenced him to 25 years in Huntsville State Prison. While in prison he developed a characteristic drawing style involving detailed patterning and line work, and was discovered at a prison art show by William Steen, who sold Clark's work to national and international buyers. Clark died on July 29, 2006, the victim of a robbery and murder in his home.

== Life ==
Born in 1936 in the small town of Bartlett, Texas, Clark's family moved to Houston. Young Henry dropped out of school after the sixth grade to "go up on the streets." According to Henry, as a young teenager he was schooled by his uncle in the ways of street hustling and gambling. Henry Ray Clark was a compelling figure in both appearance and personality. Handsome, with deep blue eyes, he came to be known on the streets of Houston as "Pretty Boy" and then "The Magnificent Pretty Boy", either by his own naming or by one of the many women who knew him. Clark's life of drug dealing, pimping, and other hustles always left him feeling on the verge of the next last score that would set him up for life. In 1977, following a series of drug-dealing convictions, he was found guilty of assault (he shot at a man who tried to run off with Clark's gambling take) and sentenced under Texas' "Three Strikes" Law to 25 years in Huntsville State Prison. There, Clark was introduced to the prison arts programs and began to draw. Clark found that drawing provided him with a release from the confinement of prison. Using ballpoint pens and salvaged manila envelopes, he created images of far-off galactic worlds inhabited by powerful beings. On July 13, 2006, Clark, aged 69, was shot in the arm and abdomen by two home invaders; he remained in a coma and on life support at Ben Taub Hospital until his death on July 29.

== Works ==
Drawing in colored ballpoint pen on any scrap of paper he could get his hands on, preferably manila envelopes, Clark drew clocks and figures; he drew the planets he said he visited in a spaceship in his dreams. Art and dreaming — tools to engineer a temporary escape from state prison. Discovered by William Steen in a prison art show, Clark found an enthusiastic reception in the wider world. After winning a prize in the "Texas Department of Corrections Art Show," he was exhibited in "Living Folk" at Hirschl & Adler Folk Gallery in New York in 1990; "Passionate Visions of the American South," New Orleans Museum of Art, 1993, and "Spirited Journeys: Self-Taught Texas Artists of the Twentieth Century," 1997. Clark said his work comes to him naturally: "I sit down and, watch a football game or watch my soap operas every day. While I'm watching, this my hand be real busy. Every once in a while, I glance down, I don't know where it come from, but it's beautiful precise control." Looking further into specific works from Clark, a well-known piece titled “I am The Day Star,” contains psychedelic patterns and shapes that complement his dreamlike style. With patterns that hint towards his cultural roots and colors that accommodate dreamlike visions, this work captures the uniqueness that separates prison art from any other. His artwork seems to capture the polarities in his life, from reality to fantasy and from the influences that come from the confines of a prison cell. Another work that embodies these traits is titled “The Magnificent Pretty Boy.” This piece, along with “I am The Day Star” captures mesmerizing patterns of exuberant creative fluidity.

== Prison art ==
Clark spent a majority of his life behind bars. In 1977, he was convicted of murder relating to a gambling confrontation. While serving time in prison, Clark found art to utilize his time behind bars. He would make art only when incarcerated, but his drawings would go far beyond the confined walls in his cell. “I have my own private galaxy out there, and it has nothing to do with you-all’s world". Clark was heavily known to include his personal experiences and cultural roots into his works. For example, it was known for him to include his dreams and visions into his drawings. Prison art was a popular form of artistic expression in contemporary American prisons, and therefore, traditions are handed down cellmate to cellmate. The exposure to materials in the confines of prison are slim. Soap carving is a common form of art, along with the usage of wrappers and recycled paper. Micheal Harms was known nationwide for his soap carvings and extensive tiny carvings. For Clark, his drawing and creating would be done on anything he could find, including manilla envelopes, prison forms and the backs of letters. His art received great attention from a prison art show then was soon receiving special recognition from the public after attending the show. A few short years after being out of jail for his first offense, Clark was charged for possession of narcotics and was sentenced 30 years. After he was released on parole, in 1994, he opened a fast food stand called the Magnificent Burger, although he was arrested shortly after because of failure to report to his parole officer. He also practiced writing poetry alongside his drawing artworks which were often rare for the public eye and only addressed to important people in his life.
