= Mountain View State School =

Former juvenile correctional facility in Texas, United States

Coordinates: 31.4872°N 97.7277°W

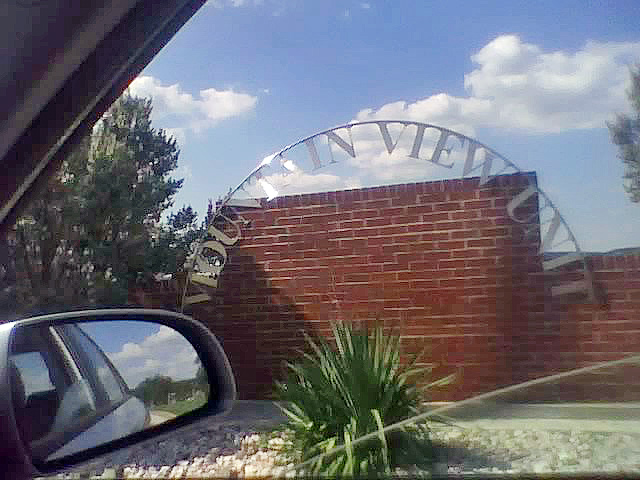
The former Mountain View State School is now the Mountain View Unit

The Mountain View State School was a juvenile rehabilitation facility operated by the Texas Youth Council in Gatesville, Texas. The building and land that once housed the school now house the Patrick O'Daniel Unit (formerly Mountain View Unit), a Texas Department of Criminal Justice women's prison.

== History ==
The Mountain View School for Boys opened on September 5, 1962. Mountain View, designed to handle chronic and serious juvenile delinquents previously housed in the Gatesville State School, had a capacity of 480 boys. In the early 1970s Mountain View began to be designated as a secure treatment facility for juvenile delinquents who were considered to be dangerous.

In 1971 a class-action lawsuit was filed against the Texas Youth Council (TYC), operator of the school, on behalf of the children in TYC facilities. Charles Derrick, a man later designated as the ombudsman of the court case, revealed that the school was actually being used as a punitive institution for children; children who did not follow orders at other Texas Youth Council institutions were forced to go to Mountain View for punishment.

In 1974 federal judge William Wayne Justice ruled on Morales v. Turman. He ordered TYC to close the Gatesville State School and the Mountain View State School and to redesign the agency's juvenile corrections system. The Mountain View school closed in 1975, and its boys were sent to other facilities. The Texas Department of Corrections bought the land and buildings. The facility re-opened as Mountain View Unit, a women's prison. The Mountain View Unit opened in July 1975.

== Demographics ==
In 1964-1965 the school on average held 316 boys. In the early 1970s Mountain View began to be a secure treatment facility for juvenile delinquents who were considered to be dangerous. In 1973 its average population was 70.

A Federal Bureau of Investigation inquiry in 1972 found that, of the 385 students, 68% were being incarcerated in a juvenile detention center for the first time. Of the population 48% were African American, 33% were White American, and 19% were Hispanic American. Most of the students were considered to be poor. 68% of Mountain View students had divorced parents. The majority of Mountain View students were behind in their educations, by scholastic achievement levels, by six to seven years.

The average intelligence quotient of a Mountain View inmate was 86; The averages of black students, White students, and Hispanic students were 79, 89, and 83, respectively. Clarence Stephens, a caseworker, said that 30-40 of the Mountain View inmates had intelligence quotients of less than 70; according to Stephens some students had IQs of 54. Kenneth Wooden, author of Weeping in the Playtime of Others: America's Incarcerated Children, said that most standards would consider those IQs to be indicators of mild retardation. The Texas Youth Council's pre-entrance diagnostic testing considered 293 boys within the agency's system to be "emotionally disturbed." 158 of those boys attended Mountain View, making up 25% of the state school's population.

== See also ==
- Texas Youth Commission
