= List of women executed in the United States since 1976 =

Since 1976, when the Supreme Court of the United States lifted the moratorium on capital punishment in Gregg v. Georgia, 18 women have been executed in the United States. Women represent about 1.06 percent of the 1,693 executions performed in the United States since 1976.

No.	Date of execution	Name	Race	Age at execution	Age at offense	State	Method	Ref.
1	November 2, 1984	Margie Velma Barfield	White	52	45	North Carolina	Lethal injection	
2	February 3, 1998	Karla Faye Tucker	White	38	23	Texas	Lethal injection	
3	March 30, 1998	Judias Anna Lou Buenoano	White	54	28	Florida	Electrocution	
4	February 24, 2000	Betty Lou Beets	White	62	46	Texas	Lethal injection	
5	May 2, 2000	Christina Marie Riggs	White	28	26	Arkansas	Lethal injection	
6	January 11, 2001	Wanda Jean Allen	Black	41	29	Oklahoma	Lethal injection	
7	May 1, 2001	Marilyn Kay Plantz	White	40	27	Oklahoma	Lethal injection	
8	December 4, 2001	Lois Nadean Smith	White	61	41	Oklahoma	Lethal injection	
9	May 10, 2002	Lynda Lyon Block	White	54	45	Alabama	Electrocution	
10	October 9, 2002	Aileen Carol Wuornos	White	46	33–34	Florida	Lethal injection	
11	September 14, 2005	Frances Elaine Newton	Black	40	21	Texas	Lethal injection	
12	September 23, 2010	Teresa Wilson Bean Lewis	White	41	33	Virginia	Lethal injection	
13	June 26, 2013	Kimberly LaGayle McCarthy	Black	52	36	Texas	Lethal injection	
14	February 5, 2014	Suzanne Margaret Basso	White	59	44	Texas	Lethal injection	
15	September 17, 2014	Lisa Ann Coleman	Black	38	28	Texas	Lethal injection	
16	September 30, 2015	Kelly Renee Gissendaner	White	47	28	Georgia	Lethal injection	
17	January 13, 2021	Lisa Marie Montgomery	White	52	36	Federal government	Lethal injection	
18	January 3, 2023	Amber McLaughlin (Note: Amber McLaughlin was identified as Scott A. McLaughlin in the death warrant, prison records and court documents. McLaughlin transitioned while incarcerated, becoming the first transgender woman executed in the United States.)	White	49	30	Missouri	Lethal injection	

== Demographics ==
Ethnicity
White	14	78%
Black	4	22%
State
Texas	6	33%
Oklahoma	3	17%
Florida	2	11%
Alabama	1	6%
Arkansas	1	6%
Federal government	1	6%
Georgia	1	6%
Missouri	1	6%
North Carolina	1	6%
Virginia	1	6%
Method
Lethal injection	16	89%
Electrocution	2	11%
Year
1976-1979	0	0%
1980-1989	1	6%
1990-1999	2	11%
2000-2009	8	44%
2010-2019	5	28%
2020-2029	2	11%
Age
20-29	1	6%
30-39	2	11%
40-49	7	39%
50-59	6	33%
60-69	2	11%
Total	18	100%

== See also ==
- List of juveniles executed in the United States since 1976
- List of United States Supreme Court decisions on capital punishment
- List of women on death row in the United States
