= Dorothy Williams (serial killer) =

American serial killer

- Born: December 12, 1954; Illinois, U.S.
- Died: December 19, 2020 (aged 66); Decatur Memorial Hospital, Decatur, Illinois, U.S.
- Children: 2
- Status: Deceased
- Motive: To support her heroin addiction
- Convictions: First degree murder (3 counts); Robbery
- Penalty: Death; commuted to life imprisonment

Details
- Victims: 3
- Span of crimes: 1987–1989
- Country: United States
- State: Illinois
- Date apprehended: September 6, 1989

Dorothy Williams (December 12, 1954 – December 19, 2020) was an American serial killer who killed three elderly people during robberies in Illinois between 1987 and 1990. A drug addict, Williams used the money she stole during the robberies to buy heroin. She also robbed five other elderly people. Initially sentenced to death, her death sentence was commuted to life in prison without parole in 2003 when everyone on death row in Illinois had their sentences commuted by Governor George Ryan over his growing concerns with capital punishment in the state. Williams died in custody on December 19, 2020, at the age of 66, one week after her birthday. She had been serving her sentence at Logan Correctional Center.

Williams strangled 79-year-old Lonnie Laws on December 5, 1987, stabbed 64-year-old Caesar Zuell to death in 1988, and strangled 97-year-old Mary Harris to death on July 25, 1989.

== References in popular culture ==
Williams's story was featured on the Investigation Discovery program Deadly Women as the third and final case of the episode "Death Knock".

== See also ==
- Kimberly McCarthy
- List of serial killers in the United States
- List of homicides in Illinois
