= Karla Faye Tucker =

American murderer (1959–1998)

- Texas Department of Criminal Justice photo
- Born: November 18, 1959; Houston, Texas, U.S.
- Died: February 3, 1998 (aged 38); Huntsville Unit, Texas, U.S.
- Spouses: Stephen Griffith; Dana Lane Brown (m. 1995)
- Status: Executed by lethal injection
- Conviction: Capital murder (2 counts) (1984)
- Penalty: Death

Details
- Victims: 2
- Date: June 13, 1983; 3:00 A.M.
- Country: United States
- State: Texas
- Location: Houston
- Weapon: Pickaxe
- Date apprehended: July 20, 1983

Karla Faye Tucker (November 18, 1959 – February 3, 1998) was an American woman sentenced to death for killing two people with a pickaxe during a burglary. She was the first woman to be executed in the United States since Velma Barfield in 1984 in North Carolina and the first in Texas since Chipita Rodriguez in 1863. She was convicted of murder in Texas in 1984 and executed by lethal injection after 14 years on death row. Due to her gender and widely publicized conversion to Christianity, she inspired an unusually large national and international movement that advocated the commutation of her sentence to life without parole, a movement that included a few foreign government officials.

== Early life ==
Karla Tucker was born and raised in Houston, Texas, the youngest of three sisters. Her father, Larry, was a longshoreman. The marriage of her parents was troubled, and Tucker started smoking cigarettes with her sisters when she was eight years old. During her parents' divorce proceedings when she was 10 years old, Tucker learned that her birth was the result of an extramarital affair.

By age 12, she had begun taking drugs and having sex. She dropped out of school at age 14 and followed her mother Carolyn, a rock groupie, into prostitution and began traveling with the Allman Brothers Band, the Marshall Tucker Band, and the Eagles. At 16, she was briefly married to a handyman named Stephen Griffith. Then she began hanging out with bikers and met a woman named Shawn Dean. Later, Shawn Dean (maiden name unknown) married Jerry Dean. The couple introduced her to a man named Daniel Ryan Garrett, or Danny, in 1981.

== Murders ==
After spending the weekend using drugs with Garrett and his friends, Tucker and Garrett entered Jerry Dean's apartment in Houston, Texas, around 3 a.m. on Monday, June 13, 1983, intending to steal a motorcycle that Dean was restoring there. James Liebrandt, a friend, went with them to Dean's apartment complex. Liebrandt reported that he went looking for Dean's El Camino while Tucker and Garrett entered the apartment with a set of keys that Tucker claimed Shawn Dean had lost and Tucker had found.

During the burglary, Tucker and Garrett entered Dean's bedroom, where Tucker sat on him. In an effort to protect himself, Dean grabbed Tucker above the elbows, whereupon Garrett intervened. Garrett struck Dean numerous times in the back of the head with a ball-peen hammer that he found on the floor. After hitting Dean, Garrett left the room to carry motorcycle parts out of the apartment. Tucker remained in the bedroom. The blows Garrett had dealt Dean caused him to begin making a "gurgling" sound. Tucker wanted to "stop him from making that noise" and she then picked up a three-foot pickaxe that was lying against the wall and began hitting Dean. Garrett then re-entered the room and dealt Dean a final blow in the chest.

Garrett left the bedroom again to continue loading Dean's motorcycle parts into his Ford Ranchero. Tucker was once again left in the room and only then noticed a woman who had hidden under the bed covers against the wall. The woman, Deborah Ruth Thornton, had argued with her husband the day before, went to a party and ended up spending the night in Dean's bed. Upon discovering Thornton, Tucker grazed her shoulder with the pickaxe. Thornton and Tucker began to struggle, but Garrett returned and separated them. Tucker proceeded to hit Thornton repeatedly with the pickaxe and then embedded the axe in her heart. Tucker would later tell people and testify that she experienced multiple intense orgasms with each blow of the pickaxe.

The next morning, one of Dean's co-workers, who had been waiting for a ride, entered the apartment and discovered the victims' bodies. The police investigation led to the arrests of Tucker and Garrett, five weeks after the killings.

=== Trial ===
In September 1983, Tucker and Garrett were indicted for murder and tried separately for the crimes. Tucker was charged with the murders of both Dean and Thornton, but after she testified against Garrett at his trial, the charge for the murder of Thornton was dropped. Garrett was not charged with Thornton's death, either. Tucker entered a plea of not guilty and was jailed awaiting trial. Soon after being imprisoned, Tucker took a Bible from the prison ministry program and read it in her cell. She later recalled, "I didn't know what I was reading. Before I knew it, I was in the middle of my cell floor on my knees. I was just asking God to forgive me." Tucker became a Christian in October 1983. She later got married by proxy to her prison minister, Reverend Dana Lane Brown, in 1995 and held her Christian wedding ceremony inside the prison.

=== Conviction ===
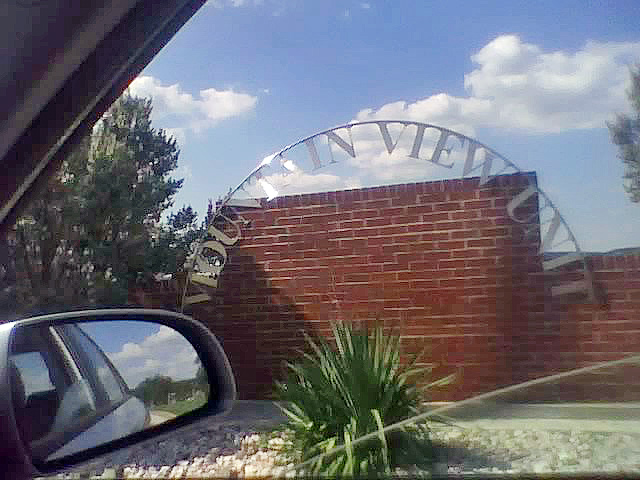
Mountain View Unit, where Tucker was held

Though the death penalty was hardly ever sought for female killers, Tucker, along with Garrett, was sentenced to death in late 1984. Garrett died of liver disease in 1993 while awaiting execution. Tucker shared her death row cell at the Mountain View Unit with Pam Perillo, whose own sentence was eventually commuted.

Between 1984 and 1992, requests for a retrial and appeals were denied, but on June 22, Tucker requested that her life be spared on the basis that she was under the influence of drugs at the time of the murders. Tucker said that she was now a reformed person, and if she had not taken the drugs the murders would never have been committed. Her plea drew support from abroad and also from some leaders of American conservatism. Among those who appealed to the State of Texas on her behalf were Bacre Waly Ndiaye, the United Nations commissioner on summary and arbitrary executions; the World Council of Churches; Pope John Paul II; Italian Prime Minister Romano Prodi; the Speaker of the U.S. House of Representatives Newt Gingrich; televangelist Pat Robertson; and Ronald Carlson, the brother of Tucker's murder victim Debbie Thornton. The warden of Texas' Huntsville prison testified that she was a model prisoner and that, after 14 years on death row, she likely had been reformed. The board rejected her appeal on January 28, 1998. Hours before the execution, Texas Governor George W. Bush refused the final 11th-hour appeal to block her execution.

In Texas, the governor cannot stay the execution of a prisoner. They can only approve the recommendation of the parole board and that is rarely ever given. Capital cases cannot be freed from prison, but can be commuted to life imprisonment.

=== Execution ===
While on death row, Tucker was incarcerated in the Mountain View Unit in Gatesville, Texas. She became Texas Department of Criminal Justice (TDCJ) Death Row Inmate #777.

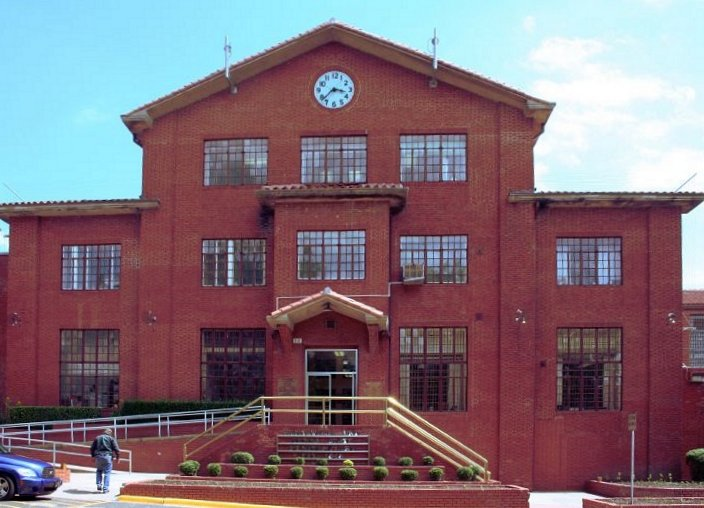
Huntsville Unit, the site of Texas' execution chamber

On February 3, 1998, state authorities took Tucker from the unit in Gatesville and flew her on a TDCJ aircraft, transporting her to the Huntsville Unit. For her last meal, Tucker requested a banana, a peach, and a garden salad with ranch dressing.

She selected four people to watch her die, who included her sister Kari Weeks, her husband Dana Brown, and her close friends Jackie Oncken and Ronald Carlson. At one time, Carlson had supported the execution of his sister's murderer, but after a religious conversion, he decided that he was now opposed to all executions. The witnesses for the murder victims included Thornton's husband Richard, Thornton's only child William Joseph Davis, and Thornton's stepdaughter Katie. Tucker's execution was also witnessed by members of the TDCJ, Warden Baggett, and various representatives of the media. Her last words were:

Yes, sir, I would like to say to all of you—the Thornton family and Jerry Dean's family—that I am so sorry. I hope God will give you peace with this. [She looked at her husband.] Baby, I love you. [She looked at Ronald Carlson.] Ron, give Peggy a hug for me. [She looked at all present weeping and smiling.] Everybody has been so good to me. I love all of you very much. I am going to be face to face with Jesus now. Warden Baggett, thank all of you so much. You have been so good to me. I love all of you very much. I will see you all when you get there. I will wait for you.

Karla is escorted into the Texas Death House for her execution

She was executed by lethal injection on February 3, 1998. As the deadly chemicals were being administered, she praised Jesus Christ, licked her lips, looked at the ceiling, and hummed. She was pronounced dead at 6:45 p.m. C.S.T., eight minutes after receiving the injection. She was buried at Forest Park Lawndale Cemetery in Houston.

Tucker was the first woman executed in the State of Texas in 135 years, when Chipita Rodriguez was executed by hanging in 1863 during the American Civil War, and the second woman executed in the United States since the reinstatement of capital punishment in 1976.

== Aftermath ==
In the year following her execution, conservative commentator Tucker Carlson questioned Governor Bush about how the Texas Board of Pardons and Paroles had arrived at their determination on her clemency plea. Carlson alleged that Bush, alluding to a televised interview which Karla Faye Tucker gave to talk show host Larry King, had smirked and spoken mockingly about her.

A full-length movie was released in 2004 about the life of Tucker entitled Forevermore starring actress Karen Jezek.

The captain of the "Death House Team," Fred Allen, was interviewed by Werner Herzog for the 2011 documentary Into the Abyss. Within days of Tucker's execution, one of over 120 he managed, he suffered an emotional breakdown. He resigned his job, giving up his pension, and changed his position on the death penalty. "I was pro capital punishment. After Karla Faye and after all this, until this day, eleven years later, no sir. Nobody has the right to take another life. I don't care if it's the law. And it's so easy to change the law."

== Depictions ==
=== Music ===
- The Tomorrowpeople (1999). "America's Deathrow Sweetheart" (Gibson/Powerchurch) on the album Marijuana Beach [Olivia Records]
- Indigo Girls (1999). "Faye Tucker" (Amy Ray) on the album Come On Now Social [Epic Records]
- Richard Dobson (1999). "Ballad of Chipita and Karla Faye" (Richard Dobson) on the album Global Village Garage [R&T Musikproduktion]
- Mary Gauthier (2001). "Karla Faye" (Mary Gauthier/Crit Harmon) on the album Drag Queens in Limousines [Munich Records BV]
- David Knopfler (2002). "Karla Faye" (David Knopfler) on the album Wishbones [Paris Records/Edel GmbH/Koch Entertainment]

=== Theatrical plays, films, and television ===
- A Question of Mercy: The Karla Faye Tucker Story (1998), TV documentary directed by Rob Feldman.
- Dead Woman Walking: The Karla Faye Tucker Story (1999), American Justice TV episode Bill Kurtis/Towers Productions.
- Crossed Over (2002), film starring Jennifer Jason Leigh and Diane Keaton.
- Karla Faye Tucker: Forevermore (2004), film directed by Helen Gibson. Full video online
- The Power of Forgiveness: The Story of Karla Faye Tucker (2000) A documentary on forgiveness.
- Karla, an off Broadway play about the death of Tucker, was written and produced by Steve Earle.
- Karla Faye's story was part of the Deadly Women season 4 episode "An Eye for an Eye."

== See also ==
- Capital punishment in Texas
- Capital punishment in the United States
- List of people executed in Texas, 1990–1999
- List of people executed in the United States in 1998
- List of women executed in the United States since 1976

== Bibliography ==
- Carlson, T. (1999). Devil May Care, Talk Magazine, September 1999, p. 106.
- Clark, T. (2000). Texas procedures on death penalty reprieves. CNN Law Center. June 22, 2000.
- King, L. (1998). Karla Faye Tucker: Live from Death Row. CNN Transcript # 98011400V22.
- Strom, L. (2000). Karla Faye Tucker set free: life and faith on death row. New York, NY. Random House: Shaw Books.
- Lowry, Beverly (2002). Crossed Over: A Murder, A Memoir. Vintage.

Executions carried out in Texas
Preceded by Michael Lee Lockhart December 9, 1997	Karla Faye Tucker; February 3, 1998	Succeeded by Steven Ceon Renfro February 9, 1998
Executions carried out in the United States
Preceded by Ricky Lee Sanderson – North Carolina January 30, 1998	Karla Faye Tucker – Texas; February 3, 1998	Succeeded by Steven Ceon Renfro – Texas February 9, 1998
Women executed in the United States
Preceded by Velma Barfield – North Carolina November 2, 1984	Karla Faye Tucker – Texas; February 3, 1998	Succeeded by Judy Buenoano – Florida March 30, 1998
