= Murder of Davontae Williams =

2004 murder in Arlington, Texas, U.S.

- Davontae Williams in an undated photo
- Born: Davontae Marcel Williams; June 13, 1995; Tarrant County, Texas
- Died: July 26, 2004 (aged 9); Arlington, Texas, U.S.
- Cause of death: Negligent homicide (malnutrition)

Davontae Marcel Williams (June 13, 1995 – July 26, 2004) was a nine-year-old boy who died of malnutrition at his apartment in Arlington, Texas. He weighed 35 pounds at the time of his death. Davontae's mother, Marcella L. Williams, and his mother's partner, Lisa Ann Coleman, were arrested, accused of depriving Davontae of food, and charged with capital murder. Marcella Williams entered a guilty plea in exchange for a sentence of life imprisonment, while Coleman refused a plea deal, was found guilty, and received a death sentence.

To support the charges of capital murder against both women, prosecutors cited kidnapping as an aggravating circumstance. When Coleman appealed her death sentence, her attorneys argued that no kidnapping had occurred because Davontae had been in his own home and had been seen walking around his apartment complex days before he died. The United States Court of Appeals for the Fifth Circuit rejected that argument, the U.S. Supreme Court declined to intercede, and Coleman was executed in 2014. Coleman's attorneys said that she was targeted for the death penalty because she was a black lesbian.

Davontae's home had been investigated by Child Protective Services (CPS) several times before he died. Some of those investigations stemmed from accusations of neglect, and Davontae and his sister had been removed from the home for a year in 1999 because of physical abuse allegations against Coleman. Davontae's death was one of several child fatalities in Texas that placed CPS under scrutiny in the mid-2000s. These deaths spurred legislation that funded the onboarding of additional CPS personnel.

== Background ==
=== Lisa Ann Coleman ===
Coleman in 2006

Coleman was born on October 6, 1975, in Tarrant County, Texas, and she grew up in adverse circumstances. She was conceived when her mother was raped by Coleman's step-grandfather. She was beaten with extension cords by an uncle and was sent from one foster home to another as a child. A child abuse expert later testified that Coleman had been sexually abused as a toddler by her foster parents. Coleman's mother, who nicknamed her "Pig", rarely saw Coleman while she was in foster care. As a preteen, Coleman was stabbed by a cousin. In her teens, she was provided drugs and alcohol by another relative. Coleman had a tenth-grade education, and she had a child when she was 16 years old. As a young adult, she went to prison twice, once for burglary and once for possession with intent to deliver a controlled substance.

=== Marcella and Davontae Williams ===
Marcella L. Williams was born in February 1981. Her son Davontae was born prematurely in June 1995; he had developmental disabilities. Marcella Williams became the subject of a CPS investigation before she lived with Coleman; the complaint alleged that Marcella was not watching two-month-old Davontae. CPS caseworkers monitored the home for six months.

In 1999, Davontae and his one-year-old sister were removed from the home due to concerns for physical abuse. When CPS investigated, Davontae had thinning hair, bruises on his back, and swelling on his lip and his penis. CPS found that Coleman had abused Davontae, and they placed Davontae and his sister in foster care. Marcella Williams regained custody of the children after a year. In order to get the children back, she agreed to stay away from Coleman. Marcella Williams had a third child in November 2000.

In October 2002, when Davontae was in the first grade, CPS received allegations that he was being physically and medically neglected. CPS caseworkers visited Davontae and his siblings, who denied being abused. Around that time, Coleman and Marcella Williams began hiding Davontae, failing to send him to school or to take him to doctors. They led school officials to believe that they had moved out of the district. CPS investigators went to the Williams home nine times between November 13 and December 30, 2002, to follow up on the October allegations, but Davontae and his family did not appear to be home during any of those visits.

== Murder ==
On July 26, 2004, Marcella Williams called 9-1-1 and told a dispatcher that Davontae had stopped breathing at their home in Arlington, Texas. When the dispatcher attempted to provide Marcella Williams with instructions for performing CPR, the call disconnected. When emergency medical personnel arrived, Coleman told them that Davontae had stopped breathing a few minutes earlier. However, they noted rigor mortis and determined that Davontae had been dead for at least several hours.

When Davontae died, he was nine years old, weighed 35 pounds and had 250 scars on his body. There were infected wounds on his wrists and legs where he had been bound with plastic extension cords. There was a fresh tear in the child's lip and a healing tear where his ear met the side of his head. A blood stain was found on a golf club in the home.

== Arrests ==
Coleman and Marcella Williams were both arrested, charged with injury to a child, and held in jail in Arlington on $200,000 bond. Davontae's sisters, ages three and six, were placed in foster care after his death. A CPS spokesperson said that the girls appeared to be healthy. The Tarrant County Medical Examiner's Office said that malnutrition caused Davontae's death; they said that pneumonia also contributed to his demise. During the ensuing investigation, Coleman told authorities that she sometimes struck Davontae with a belt and that sometimes, with the help of Marcella Williams, she tied Davontae up.

Charges against the two women were later upgraded to capital murder. Both were offered the chance to plead guilty in exchange for life sentences with the possibility of parole after 40 years. Coleman rejected the offer and went to trial for capital murder. To sustain a capital murder charge against Coleman, the State of Texas needed to prove the existence of an aggravating circumstance such as a second crime that Coleman committed in the course of carrying out the murder. (Note: At the time of Coleman's arrest, kidnapping, burglary, robbery, obstruction and terroristic threat were the aggravating circumstances that could lead to a death sentence. In 2011, Texas law was changed to make it a capital offense to murder a child under ten years old.) Citing evidence that Davontae had been bound and locked in a pantry, prosecutors advanced kidnapping as the aggravating circumstance in Coleman's case.

Marcella Williams accepted the offer and was sentenced to life imprisonment. She will not be eligible for parole until 2044. In 2014, Marcella's aunt, Tracey Williams, said the family felt that Marcella should've also been sentenced to death. She said the family blamed both women for Davontae's death and that Marcella had a responsibility to protect Davontae from harm.

== Coleman's trial ==
=== Opening statements ===
Opening statements in the Coleman trial commenced before Judge Everett Young on June 7, 2006. The prosecution said that Davontae's home was filled with food and that while the rest of the household ate well, the family withheld food from Davontae. Prosecutors highlighted the presence of scars and bruises on Davontae's body, which they said pointed to Davontae being beaten and tied up frequently. His ear appeared to have been partially torn away by the golf club found in the home, the prosecution said. Coleman's defense attorney, Michael Heiskell, accused prosecutors of rushing to blame Coleman for a death that resulted from poor parenting, not murder. Heiskell said that Coleman did not actually live with Marcella and Davontae Williams. He said that Davontae was small because he was born prematurely and that he sometimes had to be restrained because of his hyperactive behavior.

=== Testimony ===
Dr. Daniel Konzelmann, a medical examiner for Tarrant County, testified for the prosecution. He said that Davontae's body was so bruised and scarred that he initially suspected blunt trauma as the cause of death. He stated that Davontae was not fed adequately and that his diet was so deficient in protein that his body had begun to break down fat and muscle; he testified that the lack of protein also made it difficult for Davontae's wounds to heal. Konzelmann said that Davontae had very little fat around his heart, which he said was a highly unusual feature in a child. One of Davontae's sisters, who had been adopted by the time of the trial, testified that Coleman had lived with the family and sometimes tied Davontae up.

Defense witnesses included a physician who testified that Davontae died from aspirating his own vomit, not from malnutrition. A psychological associate who had evaluated Davontae in 1999 said that he had developmental delays which included speech problems, and that he needed to have grown up in a stable environment to develop properly. Addressing the prosecution's opening statement claims, a forensic consultant said that the blood on the golf club represented transfer of blood, not spatter, indicating that Davontae was not hit with the club.

Davontae's first grade teacher at Webb Elementary School in Arlington testified about his behavior. She said that he had seemed capable of learning but that he was highly distractible. She said that because of his behavioral issues, it was often necessary to have him sit next to her in the classroom.

=== Verdict and sentence ===
At the end of the trial, the jury deliberated for an hour before convicting Coleman of capital murder. In the punishment phase of the trial, Coleman's attorneys raised several potential mitigating circumstances in an attempt to spare Coleman a death sentence, including the illicit nature of her conception, her early exposure to alcohol and drugs, and the abuse that caused her to end up in foster care. A child abuse expert testified for the defense about the intergenerational effects of abuse. Coleman's lawyers also said that Coleman had bipolar disorder. The jury rejected the mitigating circumstances and sentenced Coleman to death.

== Coleman's appeals and execution ==
Coleman was represented during her appeals by John Stickels of Arlington. She also received assistance from Brad Levenson, the lead attorney at the Office of Capital Writs (OCW), the agency responsible for representing Texas death row inmates during their appeals. Stickels felt that Coleman was being unfairly targeted as a black lesbian.

In subsequent motions, Stickels argued that the capital murder charge was inappropriate, saying that Davontae could not have been kidnapped in his own home. Levenson said that Coleman's original attorneys had failed to investigate evidence that would have disproven the kidnapping allegation, such as the claims of neighbors that Davontae had appeared happy and unrestrained at functions within his apartment complex in the days before he died.

On September 16, 2014, the United States Court of Appeals for the Fifth Circuit rejected the argument against the kidnapping charge, and the U.S. Supreme Court elected not to issue a ruling in the case. The next day, Coleman was executed by lethal injection using the drug pentobarbital. While she was the 1,389th person executed in the U.S. since executions resumed in 1976, she was only the 15th woman executed during that time. She is buried at Captain Joe Byrd Cemetery.

== Aftermath at CPS ==
After the deaths of Davontae and several other children in Texas, the governor's office opened an inquiry into CPS child maltreatment investigations. A spokesperson for CPS acknowledged that the Williams home had been the subject of CPS involvement for several years; she said that the family moved frequently in an attempt to avoid CPS investigations. Caseworkers had lost track of the family in 2002. In 2005, a Texas Senate bill sponsored by Jane Nelson gave $200 million to CPS to hire and train additional staff members.

== See also ==
- List of murdered American children
- List of people executed in Texas, 2010–2019
- List of people executed in the United States in 2014
- List of women executed in the United States since 1976

== Notes ==
Executions carried out in Texas
Preceded by Willie Tyrone Trottie September 10, 2014	Lisa Ann Coleman; September 17, 2014	Succeeded by Miguel Angel Paredes October 28, 2014
Executions carried out in the United States
Preceded by Willie Tyrone Trottie – Texas September 10, 2014	Lisa Ann Coleman – Texas; September 17, 2014	Succeeded by Miguel Angel Paredes – Texas October 28, 2014
Women executed in the United States
Preceded by Suzanne Margaret Basso – Texas February 5, 2014	Lisa Ann Coleman – Texas; September 17, 2014	Succeeded by Kelly Renee Gissendaner – Georgia September 30, 2015
