= Murder of Reagan Simmons-Hancock =

2020 murder and fetal abduction case in Texas

Murder of Reagan Simmons
- Location: New Boston, Texas, US
- Date: October 9, 2020; 6 years ago
- Attack type: Murder by bludgeoning and stabbing; fetal abduction
- Weapons: Knife; Scalpel; Hammer
- Deaths: 2
- Victims: Reagan Simmons-Hancock, aged 21; Braxlynn Sage Hancock (kidnapped baby)
- Perpetrator: Taylor Rene Parker
- Verdict: Guilty
- Convictions: Capital murder, kidnapping
- Sentence: Death (November 9, 2022)

On October 9, 2020, 21-year-old Reagan Simmons-Hancock was murdered by 27-year-old Taylor Rene Parker in New Boston, Texas, United States. Parker then cut from Reagan's body her unborn daughter, Braxlynn Sage Hancock, who died the same day. Parker had previously lied to her then-boyfriend, Wade Griffin, about being pregnant 10 months leading up to the murder of Simmons-Hancock and even faked her pregnancy to multiple family members aligned to Wade. Parker was charged, tried and found guilty of capital murder, and sentenced to death on November 9, 2022.

== Background ==
Prior to the murder, the perpetrator, Taylor Rene Parker (born December 8, 1992) alias Taylor Morton and Taylor Wacasey, first befriended Reagan Simmons-Hancock (November 14, 1998 – October 9, 2020) while working as the latter's engagement and wedding photographer. Based on background information, Parker became a mother at 17, and after breaking up with the father of her first child, Parker had a second child, a son, at age 21 during her first marriage to another man. Following complications from an ectopic pregnancy after a failed tubal ligation, she underwent a hysterectomy, leaving her unable to have more children. After divorcing her first husband in 2017, Parker was married a second time in 2018. Throughout her second marriage, Parker tried to seek her friends' help to serve as surrogate mothers, as she hoped to have more children despite her hysterectomy. Her second marriage would also end with a divorce in 2019.

After her second divorce, Parker began dating Wade Griffin whom she met at a rodeo in 2019. Despite having worked at a staffing agency and an OB-GYN clinic, Parker falsely claimed to be the heiress to an oil fortune and later told Griffin she was pregnant. Over the next nine months, she sustained the deception using a silicone pregnancy belly and fake ultrasound images, even hosting a gender-reveal party and maternity photoshoot. Parker's first ex-husband later testified that he had anonymously warned her boyfriend about the false pregnancy and alleged that she had been unfaithful during their seven-year marriage and treated their son poorly.

By late September 2020, Parker had not given birth despite claiming her due date had passed. She told Griffin she would deliver via C-section or induction at Titus Regional Medical Center in Texas on October 5. After a fire at her boyfriend's house and a bomb threat at the hospital, she changed her story, claiming she would instead give birth at McCurtain Memorial Hospital in Idabel, Oklahoma, on October 9, 2020, the same date she committed the murder of Simmons-Hancock.

== Murder ==
On October 9, 2020, Parker drove to Simmons-Hancock's house in New Boston, Texas, where both Simmons-Hancock and her three-year-old daughter were present. At the house, Parker attacked Simmons-Hancock, who suffered blunt force trauma and multiple stab wounds. Forensic evidence indicated that the attack took place at several locations throughout the house, suggesting that Simmons-Hancock moved around the residence while being attacked and bled in multiple areas before she collapsed on the floor. After Simmons-Hancock died, Parker performed a crude C-section with a scalpel she had brought with her to the home. The victim's three-year-old daughter was not physically harmed during the attack. She was later found in her bedroom, hiding under a blanket in her bed.

After murdering Simmons-Hancock and stealing the baby, Parker fled to Oklahoma. While she was in De Kalb, Texas, Parker was stopped by a Texas Highway Patrol officer, who noticed she was driving erratically. Parker lied to the trooper that she gave birth while on the road and that the baby was not breathing, and the trooper also noticed an umbilical cord (which was cut from Simmons-Hancock's womb) going down her pants. Parker was taken to a hospital in Idabel, Oklahoma, where the baby girl, later named Braxlynn Sage, was pronounced dead.

Simmons-Hancock’s body was discovered very shortly after her murder, casting doubt upon Parker's story. Parker aroused further suspicion among the hospital authorities when she refused to undergo examination by doctors. Her hCG levels and an ultrasound confirmed she was not pregnant, and revealed to doctors that she did not have a uterus; a physical exam concluded she had not given birth that day. Parker was arrested as a suspect behind the killing of Simmons-Hancock. Test results later confirmed by DNA testing that the baby was not Parker's biological child but instead was the child of Simmons-Hancock.

Autopsy reports later showed that Simmons-Hancock sustained 113 sharp force injuries—15 stab wounds and 98 incised wounds—and 39 blunt force injuries. Medical examiner Melinda Flores testified that two of the knife wounds perforated Reagan's jugular vein, and some were deep enough to reach the bone, and the blunt force injuries, likely inflicted with a hammer, resulted in both a broken nose and five skull fractures. Flores concluded that the cause of death was "homicide from traumatic extraction from the uterus with both sharp and blunt force injuries". Stephen Hastings, a medical examiner from Dallas, determined that the baby died due to traumatic extraction from her mother's uterus and further ruled that the baby's death was also a homicide. Hastings also stated that there were bruises on the baby's scalp and on the umbilical cord, meaning that some of the blows inflicted on Simmons-Hancock's abdomen also landed on the baby, and the trauma to the umbilical cord was possibly due to it being pulled or squeezed during the extraction.

== Charges ==
After her arrest in Oklahoma, Taylor Parker was arrested on suspicion of murdering both Reagan Simmons-Hancock and her child. Parker was extradited back to Texas to face charges. On October 16, 2020, Parker returned to Texas and was booked into the Bi-State Detention Center and was charged with capital murder, murder and kidnapping.

On December 11, 2020, a Bowie County grand jury formally indicted Parker for kidnapping and capital murder for the deaths of Simmons-Hancock and her daughter.

On January 22, 2021, Bowie County District Attorney Jerry Rochelle announced that he would seek the death penalty against Parker. Under Texas law, the penalties for the offense of capital murder are either life imprisonment without the possibility of parole or the death penalty.

On March 4, 2021, Parker was indicted on a second count of capital murder for the death of the victim's daughter.

== Trial ==
Death row mugshot of Parker

On September 12, 2022, Taylor Parker stood trial before a Bowie County jury for the death of Reagan Simmons-Hancock and the forcible removal of the victim's child.

During her opening statements, Assistant District Attorney Kelley Crisp submitted that Parker had a motive to kill the victim, and preceding the plot itself, she also conducted a sophisticated scheme to dupe her boyfriend and many others that she was pregnant despite her inability to do so after her hysterectomy. Furthermore, the prosecution also brought forward evidence of Parker's past online searches on how to deliver a baby pre-term at 35 weeks of pregnancy and also how to fake her pregnancy, which further indicated the premeditation and planning exhibited by Parker in murdering Simmons-Hancock.

On October 3, 2022, Parker was found guilty of capital murder and kidnapping by the jury after about an hour of deliberation. On October 12, 2022, Parker's sentencing trial began before the same jury. The prosecution sought the death penalty for Parker, citing the aggravating factors and heinous nature of the murder, including the number of wounds that Parker inflicted on Simmons-Hancock, and emphasized that she was a danger to society. On the other hand, the defense argued against the death sentence and requested life without parole for Parker on the grounds of diminished responsibility at the time of the offense.

On November 9, 2022, Parker was sentenced to death by the trial court upon the jury's unanimous recommendation for capital punishment. Prior to Parker's sentencing, Simmons-Hancock's mother called her an "evil piece of flesh demon" while she was giving her victim impact statement in court and condemned Parker for murdering her daughter and slicing her body open to steal the baby.

=== Appeals ===
On November 6, 2025, Taylor Parker's first appeal was rejected by the Texas Court of Criminal Appeals. On March 19, 2026, Parker filed an appeal for a review of her death sentence to the U.S. Supreme Court, with her counsel arguing that their client did not receive a fair trial. On May 18, 2026, the U.S. Supreme Court denied the appeal.

== Aftermath ==
Following her sentencing, Taylor Parker became the seventh woman on death row under Texas law. She was also the first woman under state law to receive a death sentence in a decade, since Kimberly Cargill was sentenced to death in June 2012 for the murder of her son's babysitter. As of 2026, Parker remains incarcerated on death row at the Patrick O'Daniel Unit.

In October 2022, Simmons-Hancock's widower filed a wrongful death civil lawsuit against Parker and her former boyfriend.

In June 2026, a documentary about Parker and the murder of Reagan Simmons-Hancock, titled Maternal Instinct, became available to stream on Netflix.

== See also ==
- Murder of Bobbie Jo Stinnett
- Capital punishment in Texas
- List of death row inmates in the United States § Texas
- List of women on death row in the United States § Texas
