= Captain Joe Byrd Cemetery =

Prison cemetery in Huntsville, Texas, US

Coordinates: 30.711°N 95.536°W

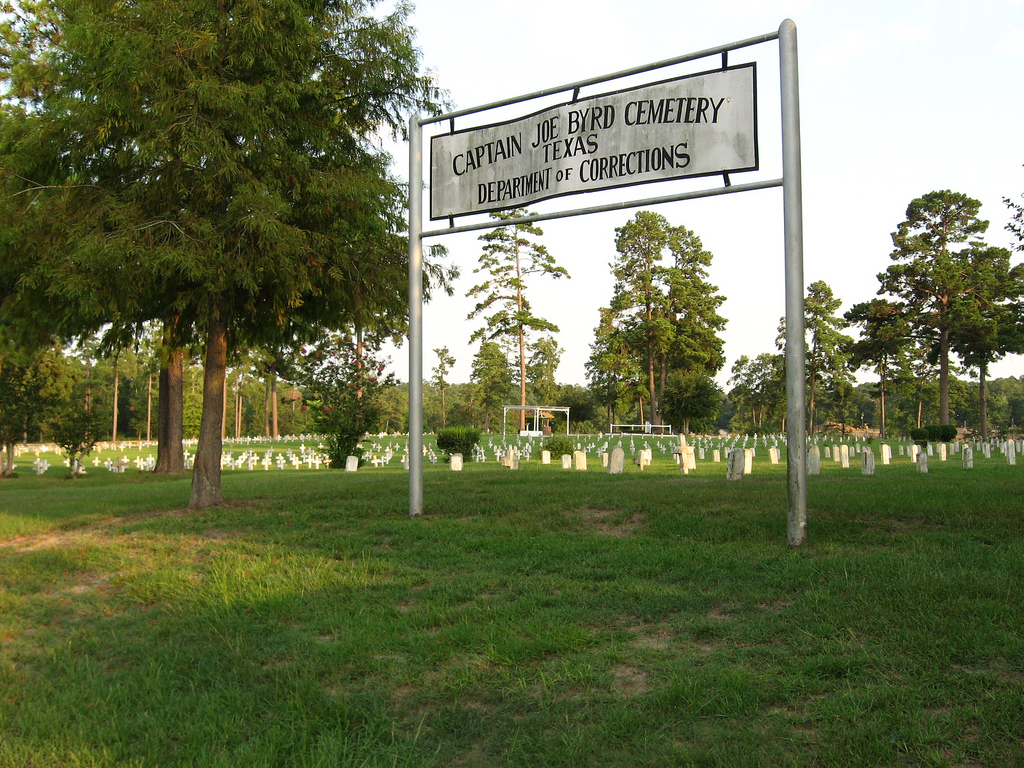
- Captain Joe Byrd Cemetery
- Interactive map of Captain Joe Byrd Cemetery

Details
- Established: c. 1850s
- Location: Huntsville, Texas
- Country: United States
- Owned by: Texas Department of Criminal Justice (TDCJ)
- Size: 22 acres (8.9 ha)
- No. of interments: 2100
- Find a Grave: Captain Joe Byrd Cemetery

The Captain Joe Byrd Cemetery is the main prison cemetery in Texas, United States, located in Huntsville and operated by the Texas Department of Criminal Justice (TDCJ). The cemetery is colloquially known as Peckerwood Hill. The name originates from "Peckerwood", a racial slur towards poor white people, because many of those buried at the cemetery were poor.

It is the place where prisoners not claimed by their families are buried. It is the largest prison cemetery in the State of Texas. Byrd's first prisoners were interred there in the mid-1800s, and the prison agencies of Texas have maintained the cemetery since then. The warden of the Huntsville Unit (nicknamed the "Walls Unit") maintains the cemetery.

== History ==
In the 1850s, officials from the Texas prison system had accidentally buried prisoners on the wrong plot of land. The owners of that plot donated the land to the state so it could be used as a burial ground.

The cemetery's current name derives from Joe Byrd, an assistant warden at the Huntsville Unit who, in the 1960s, helped restore and clean the cemetery. Byrd was also the state executioner, overseeing electrocutions at Huntsville. He was best known for the dignity and respect given to the inmates who were executed and their families. As of 2011, each burial has the presence of either the Huntsville Unit warden or a deputy of the Huntsville Unit warden. Prisoners serve as pallbearers, chisel names in headstones, and dig graves using shovels and backhoes.

In 2011, 160 prisoners were buried in the cemetery.

As of 2012, TDCJ officials confirmed that the cemetery includes remains of 2,100 prisoners. Franklin T. "Frank" Wilson, an assistant professor of criminology at Indiana State University, and a former PhD student at Sam Houston State University, did a study of the cemetery in 2011. He photographed all of the graves and concluded that there are over 3,000 graves at the cemetery. As part of his research he found that at least 30 to 40 of the prisoners were veterans of wars.

As of 2012, much of the remaining land at the cemetery is prone to flooding. In 2012 James Jones, the warden of the Huntsville Unit, stated that the state needs to find a new burial ground within two years.

== Geography ==
It is located on 22 acres (8.9 ha) of land on a hill, 1 mile (1.6 km) from the Huntsville Unit and in proximity to Sam Houston State University. Robyn Ross of the Texas Observer stated that a person could, in fewer than 10 minutes, cross the cemetery by foot. Ross described the cemetery grounds as having been "neatly maintained".

During the 1980s and 1990s the headstones that were manufactured were concrete crosses only displaying prison ID numbers and dates of death. There are other headstones which also include the names of the prisoners and the dates of birth. Headstones of death row prisoners have prison numbers with the beginning “999”, a state designation for a death row inmate, or they have the letters "EX" or "X". Because of soil shifts, some graves have collapsed.

As of 2014, over half of the graves in the prison are from after 1979. Wilson stated that this is because of an increase in imprisonment in the 1980s and 1990s.

== Operations ==
Of about 450 annual deaths that occur in the Texas prison system, about 100 prisoners are buried at the cemetery, and each burial has a cost of about $2,000. The State of Texas covers the costs of funerals at Joe Byrd. Usually the funerals at the cemetery are held on Thursdays. In order to allow families of executed prisoners to make a single trip to Huntsville instead of two separate trips, the burial of an executed prisoner not claimed by the family is usually done the day after their execution.

David Collier Sr., a chaplain in Huntsville, stated in 2014 that the most common reason why the families do not pick up the bodies is because they are unable to afford doing a burial themselves, so they often schedule a funeral in Huntsville and allow the state to bury the body. On many occasions, the prisoner's relatives do not attend the funeral. The TDCJ refers to a burial with no family members present as a "direct". Collier stated that some family members in other parts of Texas cannot afford to travel to Huntsville, and sometimes the state cannot locate family members. Prisoners working as the cemetery grounds crew stand witness in burials without family members or friends of the deceased. In the cases of a prisoner who died in the Huntsville Unit, the prisoners at the funeral may know him, but if the prisoner died elsewhere, the prisoners at the funeral will often not know the prisoner.

Wilson stated that about 2% of the people buried at the Byrd Cemetery had been executed, but the public believes that all executed prisoners are buried there because the Huntsville Unit, the site of execution in Texas, is in close proximity. Most executed prisoners are claimed by their families.

== Notable burials ==
- Kenneth McDuff (1946–1998), serial killer and rapist
- Derrick O'Brien (1975–2006), one of several perpetrators of the murders of Jennifer Ertman and Elizabeth Peña
- Henry Lee Lucas (1936–2001), serial killer
- Satanta (c. 1815–1878), Kiowa war chief; reburied in Oklahoma in 1963
- Elroy Chester (1969–2013), serial killer, rapist and child molester
- James Autry (1954–1984) convicted murderer
- David Owen Brooks (1955–2020) convicted murderer, accomplice to serial murderer Dean Corll
