= Betty Lou Beets =

American murderer (1937–2000)

- Mugshot of Betty Lou Beets
- Born: Betty Lou Dunevant; March 12, 1937; Roxboro, North Carolina, U.S.
- Died: February 24, 2000 (aged 62); Huntsville Unit, Texas, U.S.
- Occupations: Cashier, waitress
- Spouse(s): Robert Franklin Branson (m. 1952 – d. 1969); Billy York Lane (m. 1970 – d. 1970); Billy York Lane (remarried 1972 – d. 1972); Ronnie Charles Threlkeld (m. 1978 – d. 1979); Doyle Wayne Barker (m. 1979 – d. 1980); Jimmy Don Beets (m. 1982 – murdered 1983)
- Children: 6
- Status: Executed by lethal injection
- Conviction: Capital murder
- Penalty: Death (October 14, 1985)

Details
- Killed: Jimmy Don Beets, (August 6, 1983)
- Weapon: .38 handgun

Betty Lou Beets (nee Dunevant; March 12, 1937 – February 24, 2000) was a murderer executed in the U.S. state of Texas. She was convicted of shooting her fifth husband, Jimmy Don Beets, on August 6, 1983.

== Early life ==
Betty Lou Dunevant was born to Margaret Louise Smithwick and James Garland Dunevant in Roxboro, North Carolina, on March 12, 1937. She was deaf due to a childhood bout of measles, and claimed she was sexually abused by her father.

When Beets was a child, the family moved from North Carolina to Hampton, Virginia, where her father was employed as a machinist at the Langley Research Center.

Her mother was institutionalized when she was 12 years old, leaving her to take care of her younger sister and brother.

== Marriages ==
Beets married her first husband, Robert Franklin Branson, at age 15, and according to her supporters, all but one of her marriages were plagued with sexual abuse and domestic violence.

Beets had a criminal history before her arrest for murder, including public lewdness and shooting her former husband, Bill Lane, in the side of the abdomen. Married six times, twice to the same man (Bill York Lane, 1930–1983), Beets shot Lane twice in the back in 1970; she was acquitted after Lane admitted he had threatened her life first and the two remarried, divorcing again a month later. She later tried to run over her third husband, Ronnie Charles Threlkeld (1944–2012), with her car in 1978. Both men survived and testified at her murder trial.

== Crime ==
On August 6, 1983, Beets reported her fifth husband, Jimmy Don Beets, missing from their home near Cedar Creek Lake in Henderson County, Texas. Her son, Robert Branson, later testified that Beets had said that she intended to kill her husband, and told her son to leave the house. On returning to the house two hours later, he found Jimmy Don dead with two gunshot wounds. He helped his mother conceal the body below ground in the front yard of the house, after which Betty Lou telephoned the police.

According to her son, Beets put some of Jimmy Don's heart medication in his fishing boat the next day. Branson and Beets then abandoned the boat in the lake. It was found on August 12, 1983, washed ashore near the Redwood Beach Marina. Believing that he had fallen overboard and drowned, the police spent three weeks dragging the lake looking for Jimmy Don's body.

In 1985, information was received by the Henderson County Sheriff that led to enough evidence to arrest Beets for the August 6 murder. After a search warrant was issued, a search of Beets's home found the remains of Jimmy Don in a filled-in wishing well. Also found buried in a garage were the remains of Doyle Wayne Barker, her fourth husband. Both had been shot with a .38 caliber pistol. She was never tried for Barker's murder. She was sentenced to death by lethal injection.

== Trial and procedural history ==
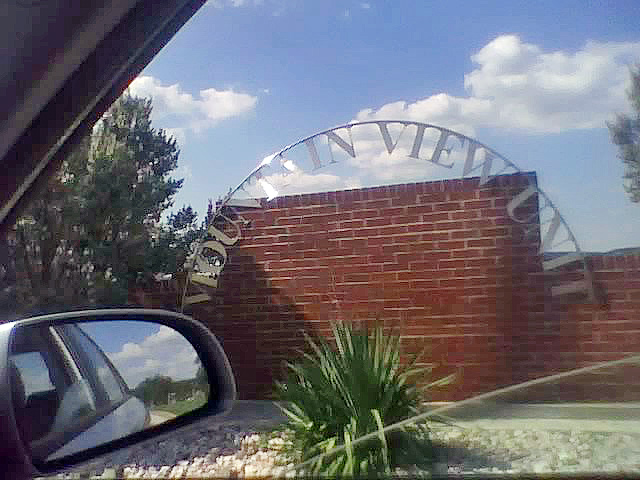
Mountain View Unit (now Patrick O'Daniel Unit), where Beets was held on death row

Her trial for the murder for remuneration and the promise of remuneration of Jimmy Don Beets began on July 11, 1985, in the 173rd district court of Henderson County. She pleaded not guilty, claiming that two of her children had committed the murders. Potentially exonerating or mitigating evidence of abuse of any kind was never presented to the court by the defense. She was found guilty on October 11 and, during the separate penalty phase three days later, sentenced to death. Beets was Texas Department of Criminal Justice Death Row # 810. She was received by the Texas Department of Corrections on October 14, 1985 and incarcerated in the Mountain View Unit (now Patrick O'Daniel Unit).

An automatic appeal to the Texas Court of Criminal Appeals first overturned the conviction, saying that insurance and pension benefits were not the same as remuneration. The state requested a rehearing on September 21, 1988; this time, the Court ruled the conviction and sentence should stand. Ten years of appeals followed. The Supreme Court of the United States denied a writ of certiorari on June 26, 1989, and an execution date was set for November 8. On November 1, she received a stay from the trial court after she filed a state habeas petition. The Court of Criminal Appeals denied this request on June 27, 1990, leading to a second execution date of December 6.

A federal petition for a writ of habeas corpus was filed three days before her scheduled execution, and the federal district court granted a stay of execution on December 4. Throughout the first half of 1991, evidentiary hearings were held, and on May 9, the court granted relief on one of Beets's claims but denied all others. The United States Court of Appeals upheld the decision on March 18, 1993, and also overturned the one claim that had been granted relief. The case was sent to a federal district court, and on September 2, 1998, it denied her habeas corpus relief. After her appeals were denied throughout 1999, an execution date was set for February 24, 2000.

== Execution ==
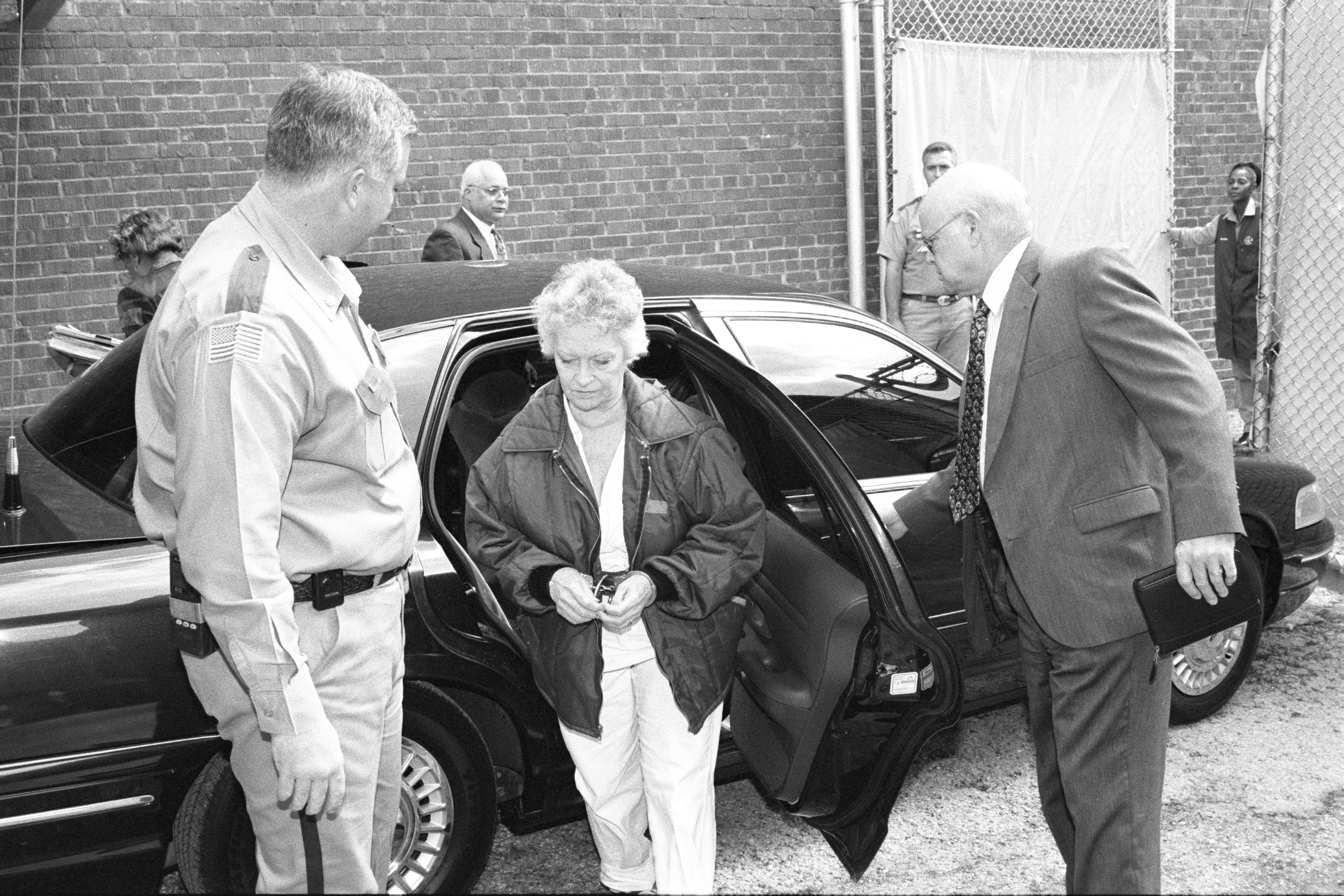
Beets arrives to the execution chamber at Huntsville Unit for her execution by lethal injection

Beets was executed by lethal injection at 6:18 pm CST on February 24, 2000, in the Huntsville Unit. She did not request a final meal, nor did she make a final statement. Beets was the second woman executed in the state after the reintroduction of the death penalty. At the time of the execution, she was 62 years old and had five children, nine grandchildren, and six great-grandchildren. Like most executed criminals, Beets was cremated after her death. Her ashes were scattered over her mother's grave.

== Media ==
Beets' crimes were described by her daughter, Shirley Furgala, as part of an episode of the TV series Evil Lives Here on September 13, 2020.

== See also ==
- Capital punishment in Texas
- Capital punishment in the United States
- List of people executed in Texas, 2000–2009
- List of people executed in the United States in 2000
- List of women executed in the United States since 1976
