= Huntsville Unit =

Texas state prison

Huntsville Unit (HV)
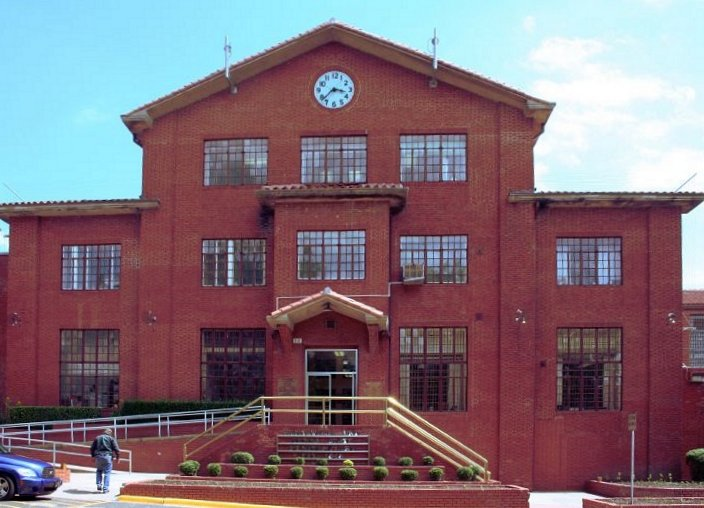

- Location in Texas
- Location: 815 12th Street Huntsville, Texas 77342; 30.7217°N 95.5466°W
- Status: Operational
- Security class: G1–G3, Security Detention, Transient
- Capacity: 1,705
- Opened: 1849
- Managed by: Texas Department of Criminal Justice
- Warden: Kelly Strong

Notable prisoners
- Chad Butler ("Pimp C"), Duane "Dog" Chapman, John Wesley Hardin, Satanta, Doc Middleton Seth Wayne Campbell (first marriage on unit)

Texas State Penitentiary at Huntsville or Huntsville Unit (HV), nicknamed "Walls Unit", is a Texas state prison located in Huntsville, Texas, United States. The approximately 54.36-acre (22.00 ha) facility, near downtown Huntsville, is operated by the Correctional Institutions Division of the Texas Department of Criminal Justice. The facility, the oldest Texas state prison, opened in 1849.

The unit houses the execution chamber of the state of Texas. It is the most active execution chamber in the United States, with 604 (as of November 12, 2026) executions since 1982, when the death penalty was reinstated in Texas.

== History ==
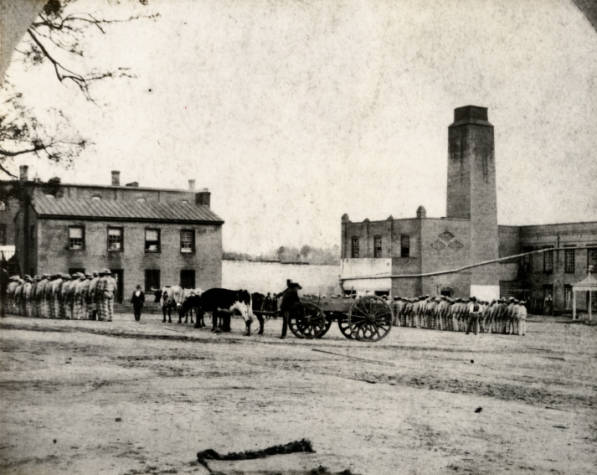
Huntsville Unit's yard during the 1870s

The prison's first inmates arrived on October 2, 1849. The unit was named after the County of Huntsville. Robert Perkinson, the author of Texas Tough: The Rise of America’s Prison Empire, wrote that the unit was, within Texas, "the first public work of any importance".

Originally Huntsville Unit was only for white Texans; the only penalties available to black Texans were whipping and hanging. During the American Civil War, prisoners at Huntsville produced tents and uniforms for Confederate forces at the prison textile factory. After the Civil War ended, Huntsville Unit was the only prison in the former Confederate States of America to remain. Perkinson stated that the prison became, within the state, the "first racially integrated public institution".

Originally women in the Texas Prison System were housed in the Huntsville Unit. Beginning in 1883 women were housed in the Johnson Farm, a privately owned cotton plantation near Huntsville. During this time there was some concern that "immoral practices may be resorted to" in regards to the female prisoners.

Historically the prison served as the administrative headquarters of the Texas Prison System and the Texas Department of Corrections; the superintendent and the other executive officers worked in the prison, and all of the central offices of the system's departments and all of the permanent records were located in the prison. In 1934 John Lomax and Alan Lomax recorded the earliest known recording of "This Little Light of Mine" when they recorded Jim Boyd of Jacksonville, Texas, singing at prison.

In 1965, the men's death row moved to the Ellis Unit.

In 1974, the prison was the site of an eleven-day siege, one of the longest hostage-taking sieges in United States history. Three armed inmates, Fred Carrasco, Ignacio Cuevas, and Rudy Dominquez, held several hostages in the education department. The ringleader, Fred Carrasco, had been a porter in the chapel. Cuevas usually worked in the inmate dining hall. Ten hostages were employees of the prison system: two were educators, and one was a guard.

Later on, the prison chaplain became a hostage. Four prisoners were held as hostages. On the final day, the inmates tried to escape using chalkboards and hostages as shields. Dominquez was killed in the attempt. Carrasco killed Elizabeth Beseda and then shot himself. Julia Standley was also killed that day. Ignacio Cuevas was executed on May 23, 1991 for her murder.

== Facility ==
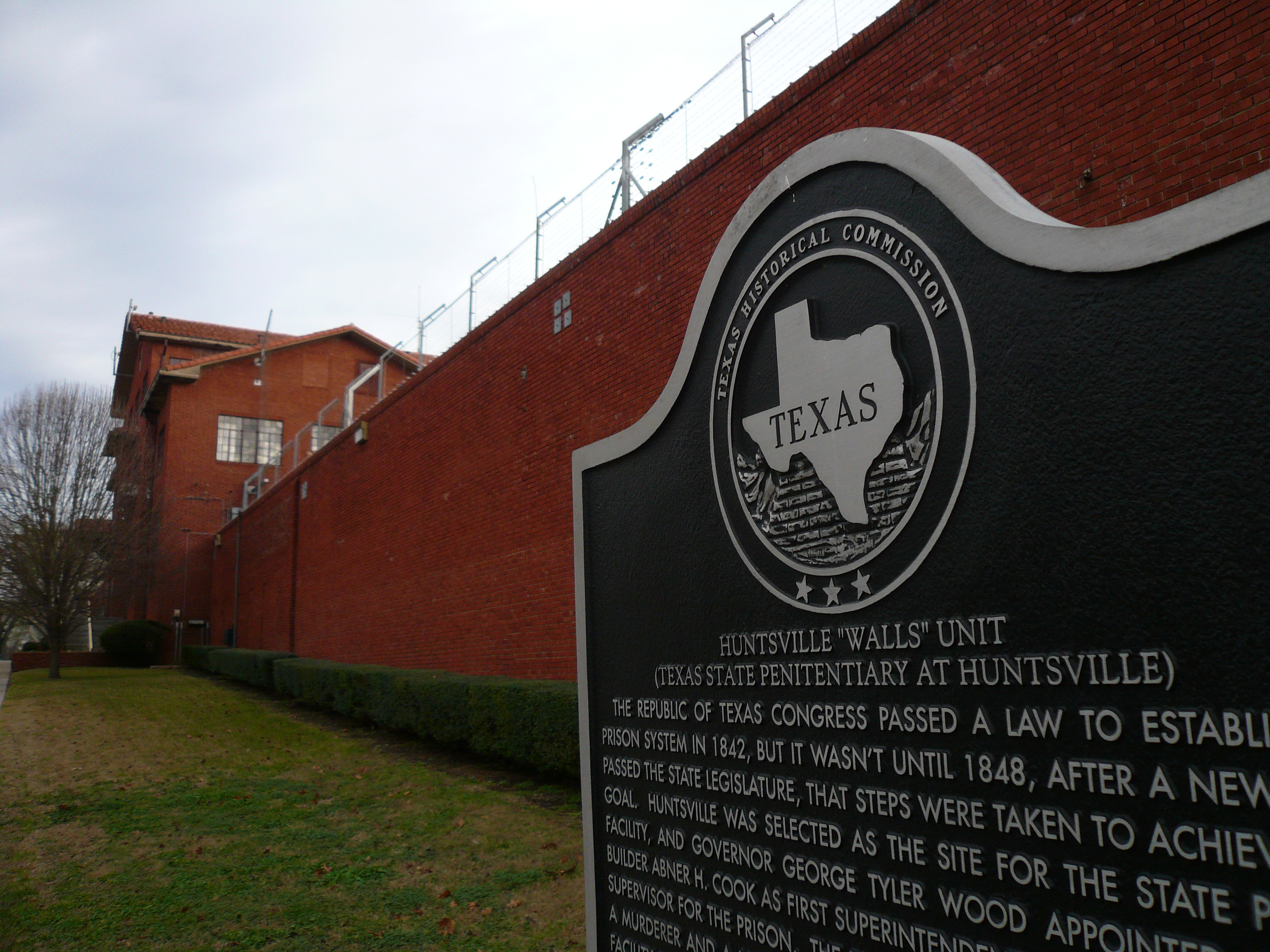
The red brick walls led to the nickname "Walls Unit".

While the prison is officially the Huntsville Unit, the prison's red brick walls led to the nickname "Walls Unit." The prison is 160 miles (260 km) southeast of Dallas and 70 miles (110 km) north of Houston. The original cellblock had been closed for several years prior to 2011. The electric chair was previously in a building adjacent to the institution's east wall. When the death row was in Huntsville, it was in the East Building.

== Operations ==
The warden of the Huntsville Unit is in charge of the maintenance of the Captain Joe Byrd Cemetery, the TDCJ prisoner cemetery. Prisoners from this unit are assigned to maintain the cemetery.

== Release center ==
The Huntsville Unit serves as one of the TDCJ's regional release centers for male prisoners. Most male prisoners are released to be closer to their counties of conviction, approved release counties, and/or residences. Male prisoners who have detainers, are classified as sex offenders, have electronic monitoring imposed by the Texas Board of Pardons and Paroles, and/or have certain special conditions of the Super Intensive Supervision Program (SISP) are released from the Huntsville Unit, regardless of their counties of conviction, residences, and/or approved release counties.

Rick Thaler, the director of the Correctional Institutions Division, predicted in 2010 that the Huntsville Unit, which serves as the regional release center for Greater Houston, will remain the TDCJ's largest release center. Throughout the history of the Texas Prison System 90% of male prisoners were sent to the unit for the final portions of their sentences before being released. Starting in September 2010 the TDCJ instead began to use regional release centers for male prisoners.

== Death penalty ==
The Huntsville Unit is the location of the State of Texas execution chamber. The TDCJ generally houses male death row inmates in the Polunsky Unit (formerly Terrell Unit) and female death row inmates in the Patrick O'Daniel Unit (formerly Mountain View Unit).

Between 1819 and 1923, the method of execution was hanging until Texas authorized the use of the electric chair; the use of the electric chair ended the execution of death sentences by counties in Texas. The chair—often euphemistically called "Old Sparky"—was constructed by inmates. Between 1924 and 1964, 362 inmates were executed by electrocution. The chair now resides at the Texas Prison Museum, located on Interstate 45 on the north side of Huntsville which features displays of historical items from the prison system, including shanks and other items confiscated from inmates.

On one occasion, the prison used a facility below the current warden's office as a death row for women. Emma "Straight Eight" Oliver, the first female death row inmate under Texas state jurisdiction, was sentenced to death in 1949. In 1951, her sentence was commuted to life imprisonment. Subsequently, the Goree Unit and then the O'Daniel Unit were used as women's death rows.

=== Execution procedure ===
Inmates scheduled for execution are brought from death row on the Polunsky Unit to the Huntsville Unit early in the afternoon of their execution. Unlike other states, Texas ended (in 2011) the custom of personalized last meals, partly due to the abuse of this privilege by convicts and also because victims were never granted the right to a "special meal". Inmates may, but are not required to, make their closing remarks prior to execution. By law, executions are to be held after 6:00 p.m. Huntsville (Central) time.

Until that time, the condemned inmates are housed about 30 feet (9.1 m) from the door of the execution chamber. The Texas Death House is located at the northeast corner of the Huntsville Unit, just below the #1 picket. No law prohibits multiple executions in a single day, but this has not happened since August 2000.

The execution chamber is a 9-foot (2.7 m) by 12-foot (3.7 m) room, with mint green-painted walls and a gurney. When Jim Willett was warden of Huntsville Unit, he added a pillow to the gurney. Texas uses a single lethal dose of pentobarbital to execute condemned inmates. Two adjacent rooms, which allow viewing into the execution room through glass windows, are for two groups. One room is reserved for witnesses from among the family and friends of the crime victim(s), while the other is for the family and friends of the condemned.

== Notable inmates ==
This list does not include death row inmates who were only housed in other units (Ellis, Polunsky, and/or O'Daniel) and executed in Huntsville on the days of their executions. For people held at Huntsville Unit only for execution, see Lists of people executed in Texas.

Inmate Name	Register Number	Status	Details
Chad Butler		Transferred to Huntsville from the Terrell Unit in Brazoria County, Texas on the week of his release from the TDCJ system	Known as Pimp C, a rapper
Fred Carrasco		Committed suicide	Perpetrator of the 1974 Huntsville Prison Siege
Henry Ray Clark		Released, now deceased	Artist known as The Magnificent Pretty Boy
Duane 'DOG' Chapman	TDCJ #271097	Served 18 months for a murder in 1977.	Star of the television show Dog the Bounty Hunter
Jack Purvis		Committed a robbery in El Paso, Texas	Musician
John Wesley Hardin		Served from September 28, 1878, to March 16, 1894	Outlaw and gunfighter of the American Old West
Satanta		Committed suicide in the prison	A Kiowa war chief
Carlos Coy	TDCJ #01110642	Eligible for parole on October 7, 2024; projected release date April 8, 2047	Known as SPM (South Park Mexican), a rapper
Isayah Fatu		Served six years for robbery between 2016 and March 2022.	Known as Zilla Fatu, a professional wrestler

- Buck Barrow, Barrow Gang
- George Hassell: Huntsville Unit Death Row, Executed in February 1928.
- W. D. Jones, Barrow Gang, 6 years at Huntsville

Country music star Cody Johnson worked as a correctional officer at Huntsville before starting his music career.

== Cultural references ==
- "Huntsville", a song on Merle Haggard's 1971 album, Someday We'll Look Back references being sent to Huntsville Prison.
- The Getaway, a 1972 Sam Peckinpah film, which starred Steve McQueen, was filmed here.
- Cross Canadian Ragweed has a song that is about the prison called "Walls of Huntsville" on their 2002 self-titled album.
- Steve Earle recorded "Ellis Unit One" (after the Ellis Unit) for the 1995 film Dead Man Walking. The song's lyrics focus on the effect of the death penalty on the guards that carry it out. Earle has been a vocal critic against the death penalty.
- Kevin Costner portrayed the convict Butch Haynes in the 1993 film A Perfect World, who escaped from Huntsville Prison.
- Texas Country artist Cody Johnson refers to the prison in his song "Texas Kind of Way", with the lyric "might as well just lock me up in Huntsville, if your memory's here to stay".
- In the 2007 film No Country for Old Men, it was mentioned that the Sheriff in Terrell County, Texas had sentenced a man to death in the Huntsville Unit for killing a 14-year-old girl.
- Subject of a song by country singer Bobby Bare - "Back Home In Huntsville Again"
- In Quentin Tarantino's Jackie Brown, the characters played by Samuel L. Jackson and Robert De Niro first met while doing time in Huntsville.
- In the 2003 video game Freelancer, the LPI Huntsville is a prison ship orbiting Houston planet in the Texas system.
- David Allan Coe refers to the "Huntsville prison walls so high" in his song "Houston, Dallas, San Antone".
- The 2003 film, The Life of David Gale, was shot in multiple places, including Huntsville, Texas. In the film, Kevin Spacey played the eponymous character, a college professor and longtime activist against capital punishment who is sentenced to death for killing a fellow capital punishment opponent.
- Werner Herzog's 2011 documentary Into the Abyss, follows the execution of Jason Burkett which took place in the Huntsville unit. It features numerous shots of the chamber and describes the execution process.
- Jason Boland & The Stragglers released a song off 2015 CD Squelch titled "Christmas in Huntsville".

== See also ==
- List of Texas state prisons
- Texas Prison Rodeo
- Capital punishment in Texas
