= Vickie Dawn Jackson =

Convicted American serial killer

- Born: Vickie Dawn Carson; February 13, 1966 (age 60); Montague County, Texas, U.S.
- Conviction: Capital murder
- Penalty: Life imprisonment

Details
- Victims: 10+
- Span of crimes: 2000–2001
- Country: United States
- State: Texas
- Date apprehended: July 16, 2002
- Imprisoned at: Christina Melton Crain Unit, Gatesville, Texas

Vickie Dawn Carson Jackson (née Carson; born February 13, 1966) is an American serial killer who killed at least 10 patients at the Nocona General Hospital in Nocona, Texas, between 2000 and 2001, using the muscle paralytic drug mivacurium. Despite protesting her innocence, she was found guilty on all counts and sentenced to life imprisonment.

== Background ==
Born Vickie Dawn Carson on February 13, 1966, in Montague County, Texas, little is publicly known about Jackson's early life. A licensed vocational nurse since 1989, who worked at several other hospitals and a nursing home around North Texas, she eventually found employment at the Nocona General Hospital sometime during late 2000. The hospital is known for treating predominantly elderly patients with slight ailments, and was considered among the nation's 100 best facilities despite its modest nature.

== Mysterious deaths and investigation ==
Between December 2000 and February 2001, Nocona General Hospital recorded an unusually large surge in patient deaths, all of whom were between the ages of 62 and 100 and had previously been in healthy condition. While this was initially attributed to the patients' advanced age and weaker immune system, rumors spread around the facility that perhaps somebody had purposefully began killing them. This eventually led the hospital's administrator, Charles E. Norris to contact a pharmacist about a discrepancy he had taken note of: during this period, vials of Mivacron had been going missing, which was initially ascribed to inventory mismanagement, as it was not considered a lethal substance. After consulting with the pharmacist, and tracing that all of the deaths occurred during one particular shift, Norris ordered that the cabinets with Mivacron be locked up and accessed only by the supervisors, and that the police should be immediately notified.

Subsequently, a joint investigation by the local police, the Texas Rangers and the FBI was launched to investigate the deaths of more than 20 patients who may have been poisoned with Mivacron. While exhumations from cemeteries in North Texas and Oklahoma were underway, newspapers revealed that a civil lawsuit had been filed on behalf of one polio patient, 61-year-old Donnelly Reid, who claimed that one of the nurses, Vickie Dawn Jackson, who had since been fired, had injected a drug into his IV tube. While Reid survived the ordeal thanks to another nurse who came to his aid, he would die two months later from pneumonia. A week after that, another lawsuit was filed by the children of 87-year-old Boyd Bruce Burnett, alleging that Jackson had injected him with an unprescribed drug that later resulted in his death on December 24, 2000.

== Arrest, trial and imprisonment ==
After being fired from the hospital, Jackson found herself a new job at a local grocery store, where she was arrested on July 16, 2002, on four capital murder charges. She was remanded to await trial on $2 million bond, while the authorities continued to exhume and examine bodies for any further potential victims. Her trial was scheduled for October 2004, and a gag order was issued on the case, preventing lawyers from revealing the specifics aside from the fact that prosecutors would not seek the death penalty. In January 2004, Jackson was charged with an additional six murders, and her bond raised from $2 million to $6 million.

Jackson's first trial would eventually result in a mistrial, as the judge determined that comments made by prosecutor Ralph Guerrero had prejudiced jurors towards the defendant. As a result, the venue for the upcoming trial was moved to San Angelo, and that new jury would be selected. Guerrero had told the jurors that investigators had located vials of Mivacron at Jackson's home, and suggested that her failing marriages and losing custody of her children might have been contributing factors for her decision to start killing her patients.

At her second trial, FBI Special Agent David Burns testified against Jackson, revealing that in the course of several interrogations with her, he determined that she had killed the patients in fits for anger for being "too demanding", and that she had attempted to injure several others, including a 14-year-old girl and a 40-year-old woman suffering from Crohn's disease. When pressed as to why she felt the need to kill them, she simply replied that she did not know. In the end, Jackson pleaded no contest to the ten capital murder charges, accepting the life imprisonment terms in exchange for avoiding a jury trial and having her daughter testifying against her. Following her conviction, she released a statement via her attorney proclaiming her innocence and expressing her sympathy for the families of the victims, which was met with lukewarm reception. She and defense team attended an evidentiary hearing in 2015, seeking a new trial and a dismissal of writ, but no results have been reported of that endeavor.

As of August 2021, she remains incarcerated at the Christina Melton Crain Unit in Gatesville, with her earliest possible parole date being in 2042.

== Victims ==
Number	Name	Sex	Age	Date of death
1	Donna Alice Jennings	F	100	December 11, 2000
2	Sanford Ray Mitchell	M	62	December 20, 2000
3	James Wesley Gore	M	80	December 29, 2000
4	Jimmy Ray Holder	M	65	January 7, 2001
5	Dorothy Jean Vandenburg	F	78	January 7, 2001
6	J. T. Nichols	M	80	January 11, 2001
7	John Walter Williams	M	78	January 11, 2001
8	Omo Ovella Glenn Wyler	F	95	January 24, 2001
9	Orvel Lee Moore Jr.	M	82	January 30, 2001
10	Everett E. Jackson	M	92	February 4, 2001

== See also ==
- List of serial killers in the United States

== Bibliography ==
- Katherine M. Ramsland (August 30, 2007). Inside the Minds of Healthcare Serial Killers: Why They Kill. Praeger. ISBN 978-0275994228.
- Virginia A. Lynch and Janet Barber Duval (July 23, 2010). Forensic Nursing Science. Elsevier Canada. ISBN 978-0323066372.
- Kelly M. Pyrek (January 19, 2011). Healthcare Crime: Investigating Abuse, Fraud, and Homicide. CRC Press. ISBN 9781439820339.

== In media and culture ==
- On the second season of the British docu-series Nurses Who Kill, Jackson's case was covered in the second episode.
- This case is covered in Nightingale No More: the Case of Vicki Dawn Jackson - On the Podcast Killer Psyche.
- An episode of Murder By Medic focused on Jackson's case.
