= Christina Melton Crain Unit =

Women's prison in Gatesville, Texas

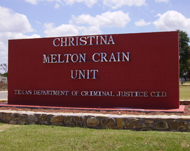

- Location in Texas
- Location: 1401 State School Road Gatesville, Texas 76599-2999; 31.4713889°N 097.7405556°W
- Status: Operational
- Security class: G1-G5, Transient, Outside Trusty, Developmentally Disabled, Substance Abuse
- Capacity: Unit: 1,498; Boot Camp: 8 SAFP: 288; Trusty Camp: 321
- Opened: August 1980
- Former name: Gatesville Unit
- Managed by: TDCJ Correctional Institutions Division
- Warden: Kimberly Garza
- Website: Official website

The Christina Melton Crain Unit (formerly the Gatesville Unit) is a Texas Department of Criminal Justice prison for females in Gatesville, Texas. The prison is along Texas State Highway 36, 3 miles (4.8 km) north of central Gatesville. The unit, with about 1,317 acres (533 ha) of space, is co-located with the Hilltop Unit, the Dr. Lane Murray Unit, and the Linda Woodman Unit. Nearby also is the Patrick O'Daniel Unit (formerly the Mountain View Unit), which houses all Texas female inmates on death row. Crain Unit's regular program houses around 1,500 women, and it is one of Texas's main prisons for women. Female prison offenders of the TDCJ are released from this unit. With a capacity of 2,013 inmates, Crain is the TDCJ's largest female prison.

== History ==
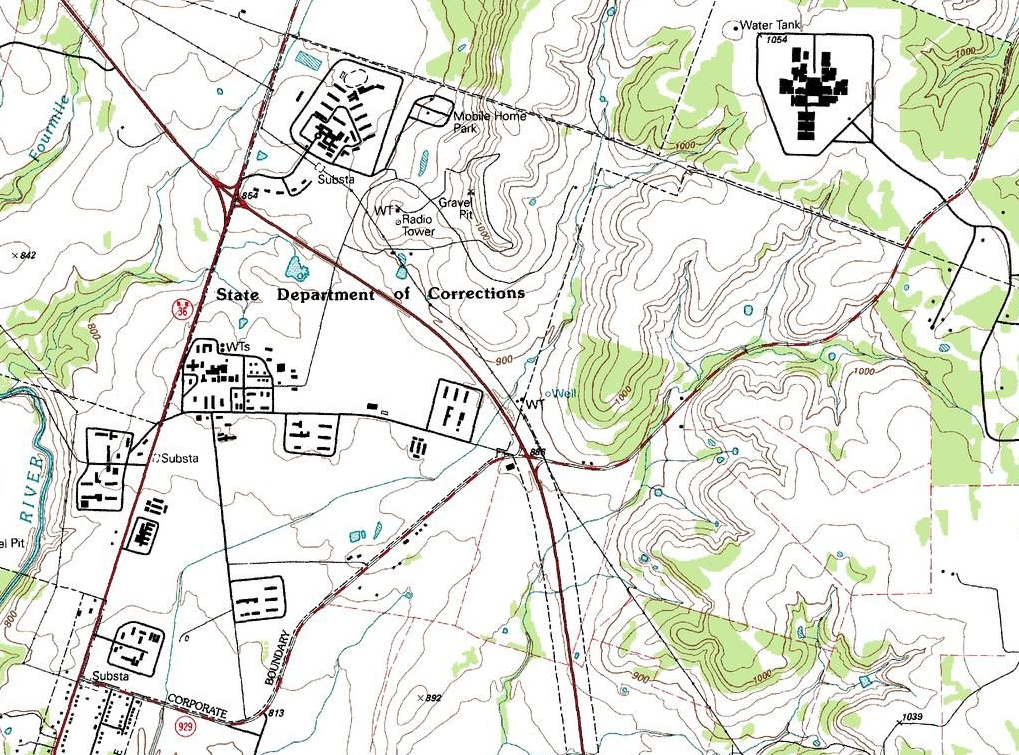
Topographical map of the Gatesville prison units (Crain, Mountain View, Hilltop, and Hughes), U.S. Geological Survey, 1994

The Gatesville Unit, formed on portions of the former Gatesville State School, opened in August 1980. The portions of Gatesville State School that became the Crain Unit include the Live Oak, Riverside, Sycamore, Terrace, and Valley schools, while the Hackberry and Hilltop units of the former state school became the Hilltop Unit. The Gatesville Unit was named after the City of Gatesville.

From its opening until several years before 2010, the Gatesville Unit was primarily a work farm, and staff members placed new prisoners in the fields to work. Due to reductions in staffing levels and new security mandates, the prison's agricultural operations were reduced. In 2008 the Texas Board of Criminal Justice unanimously voted to rename the Gatesville Unit after Christina Melton Crain, the first female chairperson of the Texas Board of Criminal Justice. On that day the name change became effective immediately. Crain, a resident of the Preston Hollow area of Dallas, worked as a lawyer. She left the Texas Board of Criminal Justice in May 2008.

== Location, composition, and operations ==
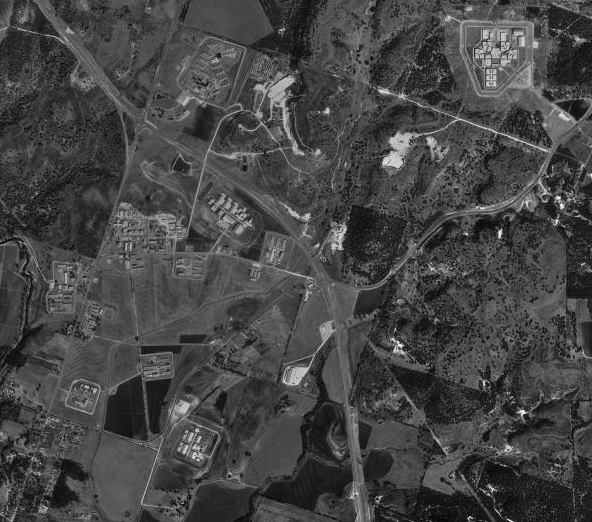
Aerial photograph of the prisons in Gatesville, January 13, 1996, United States Geological Survey

The Christina Crain Unit houses all non-death row custody levels and is equipped to hold 2,014 prisoners. Crain consists of seven separate satellite units, each serving a distinct purpose.

Crain's Reception Center is the place where new female arrivals to the TDCJ are processed. In addition the center houses a boot camp program. The 174 bed Valley Unit houses pregnant, elderly, and developmentally delayed prisoners. As of 1993 72 beds are reserved for the intellectually disabled. In addition Valley houses the prison library. Female prisoners throughout Texas who are not state jail prisoners or substance abuse felony punishment facility residents are released from the Crain Unit.

Most women in Crain live in dormitories described by Leah Karotkin of the Houston Press as "drab" and "low-slung." Most inmates work seven hours per day. Jobs include painting and repairing buildings, maintaining and repairing large equipment such as boiler units, hoeing fields, and fixing potholes. Crain includes a trustee camp, which was one of the first to be built by the TDCJ. The camp, which has no perimeter fence, houses non-violent minimum custody inmates who need less supervision than regular inmates and who are less likely to escape than regular inmates. The trustees live in an open dormitory and work in prisoner and prison guard beauty shops, food service, landscaping, and transportation. Women in the Valley Unit work as beauty operators, clerks, cooks, kitchen workers, and landscape gardeners. Crain has 20 beds available for the Sentence Alternative to Incarceration Program, a 90-day program for first time offenders between the ages of 17 and 25. The boot camp is housed in a former infirmary in the Reception Center. 32 isolation cells are reserved for difficult prisoners.

Amy Smith of the Austin Chronicle wrote that the Terrace Unit campus "resembles a 1950s-era elementary school that has survived decades of budget cuts." It has three regular dorms and a cellblock building with small 2 person cells. Terrace Unit houses about 340 total inmates. It is a medical unit which holds many of Crain's elderly inmates. Air conditioning was installed in Spring 2018 in the regular dorms but not in cellblock.

As of 1993 women who are about to give birth are transported to the Hospital Galveston unit in Galveston, which is located five hours away from Gatesville by automobile.

== Prisoner life ==
In 1993 Leah Karotkin of the Houston Press said "Anticipating my visit to Gatesville, I had expected more drama. Instead, I was struck by the simple endless monotony of the prison, disappointingly mundane rather than what I expected. More than hard-time punishment, alienation and loneliness seem to be the goals, or at least the most obvious effects, of the institution. Still, it's clear, Gatesville is a pretty rough place to be." In 2010 Robert Perkinson, author of Texas Tough: The Rise of America's Prison Empire, said that Crain was "not the hardest place to do time in Texas."

Major Janice Wilson, who was the head prison guard in 1993, said during that year that many women in Crain gain close bonds with women who they sympathize or feel sorry for. Some women had been in romantic relationships where they received battery, and some had experienced several romantic relationships that, to them, were not good. According to Wilson these women become friends, and some of the women engage in homosexual relationships. As of 1993 the institution forbids sexual conduct between two prisoners, and women can lose class time if they are caught. In several published reports that existed by 1993, prisoners said that the isolation is a factor in the sexual relationships that are formed at the unit. Wilson added that the aspect many women dislike the most about Crain is the lack of accessibility to their families and children. For many, visits occur infrequently and women do not often get to make telephone calls. Many relatives have very little money and do not have much time that they can use to visit their imprisoned relatives. Wilson said that a constant underlying internal tension existed at Crain.

== Demographics ==
As of 2008 the prison had about 2,000 inmates, about 540 correctional officers, and about 210 other employees.

== Programs ==
Robert Perkinson, author of Texas Tough: The Rise of America's Prison Empire, said that the Crain Unit has a "rich assortment of programming" compared to most Texas prisons. The unit includes a female boot camp and a Substance Abuse Felony Punishment (SAFP) facility.

== Notable inmates ==
Current:

Inmate Name	Register Number	Status	Details
Celeste Beard	05144897 / 01157250	Serving a life sentence. Eligible for parole in 2042.	Convicted of plotting the 1999 murder of her husband, Steven Beard, in which he was killed by another woman, Tracey Tarlton.
Vickie Dawn Jackson	03672417 / 01405809	Serving a life sentence. Eligible for parole in 2042.	Convicted of murdering 10 people while working as a nurse at a hospital.
Debra Jeter	08388667 / 01641408	Serving a life sentence without the possibility of parole.	Murdered one of her daughters, and attempted to murder her other, in 2009.
Verna Deann McClain	50047432 / 01897575	Serving a life sentence without parole.	Convicted of the 2012 murder of Kala Marie Golden Schuchardt, in which after killing her, proceeded to kidnap Schuchardt's newborn.
Christine Paolilla	07188577 / 01529580	Serving a life sentence. Eligible for parole in 2046.	Perpetrator of the 2003 Clear Lake Murders, in which she murdered 4 people.

Former:

- Krystal Maddox (a perpetrator of the 1999 Kingwood robbery incidents)
- Yolanda Saldívar
- Lisa Warzeka (a perpetrator of the 1999 Kingwood robbery incidents)
- Susan Wright
