= Stephanie Nadolny =

American voice actress

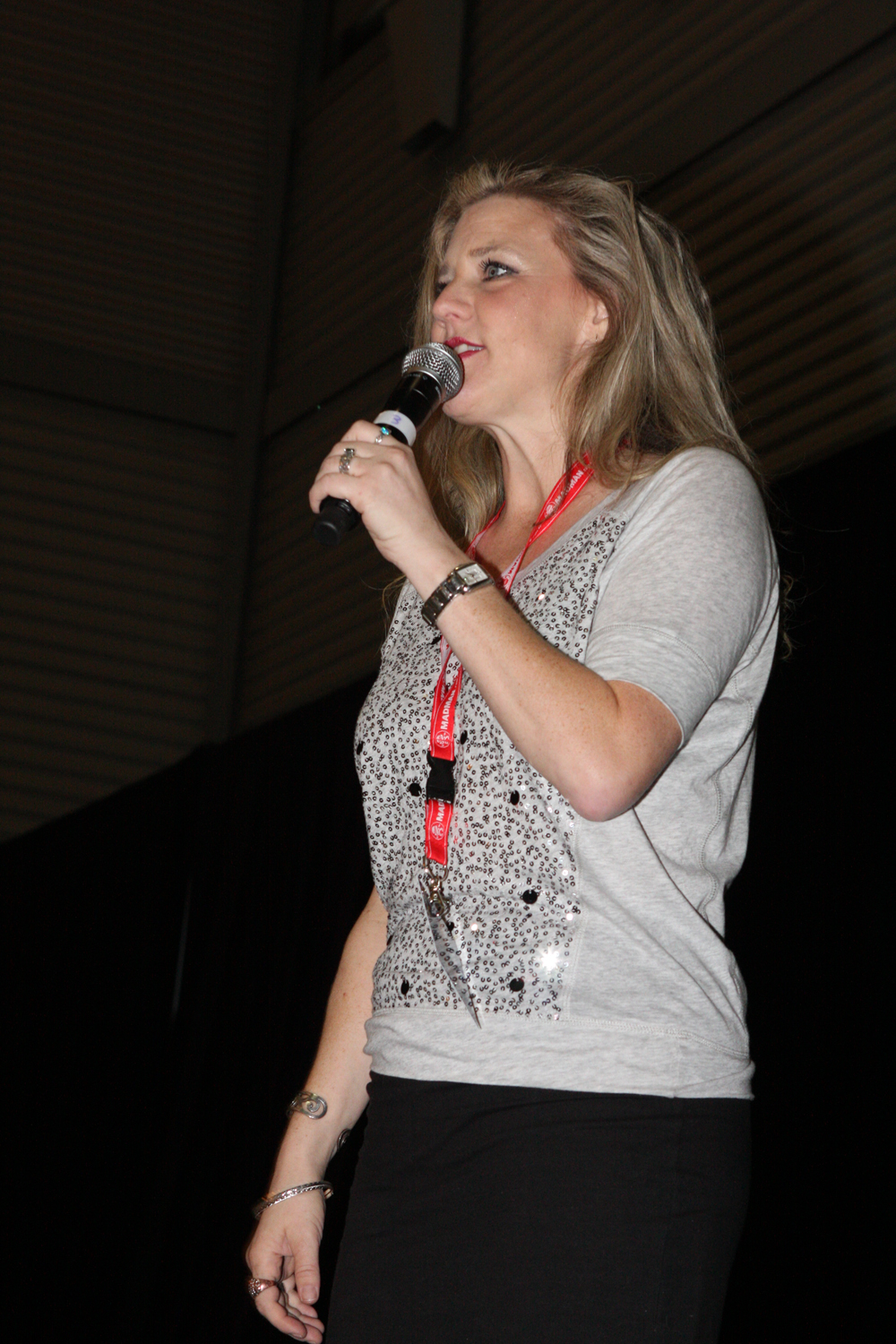
- Nadolny at Supanova in Sydney 2012
- Born: Stephanie Ann Nadolny
- Occupation: Voice actress
- Years active: 1989–present

Stephanie Ann Nadolny is an American voice actress, known for her English dubbing role as the child version of Son Goku, the protagonist of the Dragon Ball series, and the child version of Goku's son, Son Gohan, in Dragon Ball Z. She reprised both roles in several Dragon Ball–related video games and other media. She works for Funimation and ADV Films.

In 2013, Nadolny voiced K.O. in the pilot of the Cartoon Network Studios original program Lakewood Plaza Turbo. She reprised the role in Cartoon Network's OK K.O.! Let's Be Heroes from 2017 to 2018.

== Career ==
Nadolny began her voice acting career in the late 1980s/early 1990s through her established background as a singer and performer in the Dallas-Fort Worth (DFW) area, where Funimation was based. She had a lifelong interest in acting, singing, mimicking voices, and musical theater from a young age. After high school, she performed with bands (starting locally around age 18), toured with groups like Lindy and the Look and the internationally known Vince Vance & the Valiants (as a long-running member under the stage name Violet Valiantette), and collaborated with the Grammy-winning polka band Brave Combo on vocals for over 20 albums. She also did studio recording work, radio jingles, parodies, and even voiced Helen Henny for Chuck E. Cheese’s in the mid-1990s. Her entry into professional voice acting came via connections in the local music and recording scene. While working on music projects (including some anime theme songs for Funimation shows like Cyborg 009), she met producers/directors at the then-small Funimation studio. She auditioned by providing a child/boy voice impression for a young male character, which landed her the role of young Gohan in the English dub of Dragon Ball Z. This led directly to her voicing young Goku in the Dragon Ball series (replacing or following earlier performers in some dubs). Her voice acting debut is often cited as starting with these iconic Dragon Ball roles around 1989–1990s (with years active listed as 1989–present), marking her transition from live music/performance into dubbing anime for Funimation and ADV Films. She has since voiced the characters in numerous episodes, films, games, and even reprised young Goku as “Mini Goku” in Dragon Ball Daima. Later non-anime work includes voicing K.O. in the OK K.O.! Let's Be Heroes series and pilot (recruited around 2011–2013). Her career highlights a natural progression from singing/mimicking to voice-over, aided by regional industry ties and her versatile high-pitched/child voice talent.

== Legal issues ==
Nadolny was booked five times for driving while intoxicated from 2016 to 2024. In June 2025, she committed a property theft, which triggered an automatic felony charge because of her prior conviction history. On January 15, 2026, Nadolny was sentenced to 180 days in prison, where she was incarcerated at Linda Woodman State Jail before she was transferred to Dr. Lane Murray Unit. She was denied parole on April 28, 2026, due to her criminal history, and was released on November 13, 2026.

== Filmography ==
=== Animation ===
- Lakewood Plaza Turbo (2013) – K.O., Gladys
- OK K.O.! Let's Be Heroes – K.O. (Episodes 4, 5, 6, 11, and 43)
  - TV Shorts (2016–2017)
  - TV series (2017–2018)

=== Video games ===
- OK K.O.! Lakewood Plaza Turbo – K.O. (2016)

== Dubbing roles ==
=== Voice roles dubbing (as Goku and Gohan in Dragon Ball series) ===
==== Series ====
- Dragon Ball - Goku (Young)
- Dragon Ball Z - Gohan (Young/Teen), Goku (Young) (Flashback)
- Dragon Ball GT - Goku (Young/Baby), Goku Jr., Gohan (Teen) (Flashback)
- Dragon Ball Daima - Goku (Mini)

==== Films ====
- Dragon Ball Z: Dead Zone - Gohan
- Dragon Ball Z: The World's Strongest - Gohan
- Dragon Ball Z: The Tree of Might - Gohan
- Dragon Ball Z: Lord Slug - Gohan
- Dragon Ball Z: Cooler's Revenge - Gohan
- Dragon Ball Z: The Return of Cooler - Gohan
- Dragon Ball Z: Super Android 13! - Gohan
- Dragon Ball Z: Broly - The Legendary Super Saiyan - Gohan, Goku (Baby) (Flashback)
- Dragon Ball Z: Bojack Unbound - Gohan
- Dragon Ball Z: Broly – Second Coming - Goku (Baby) (Flashback)
- Dragon Ball: The Path to Power - Goku
- Dragon Ball Z: Battle of Gods - Goku (Young), Gohan (Teen) (Flashback) (archive audio; uncredited)
- Dragon Ball Super: Super Hero - Gohan (Teen) (archive audio; uncredited)

==== TV specials ====
- Dragon Ball Z: Bardock - The Father of Goku - Goku (Baby)
- Dragon Ball Z: The History of Trunks - Gohan (Young)
- Dragon Ball GT: A Hero's Legacy - Goku Jr.

==== Video games ====
- Dragon Ball: Advanced Adventure - Goku
- Dragon Ball: Origins - Goku
- Dragon Ball: Origins 2 - Goku
- Dragon Ball: Revenge of King Piccolo - Goku
- Dragon Ball Z: Budokai - Kid/Teen Gohan
- Dragon Ball Z: Budokai 2 - Teen Gohan
- Dragon Ball Z: Budokai 3 - Kid Goku, Kid/Teen Gohan
- Dragon Ball Z: Budokai Tenkaichi - Kid Goku, Kid/Teen Gohan
- Dragon Ball Z: Budokai Tenkaichi 2 - Kid Goku, Kid/Teen Gohan
- Dragon Ball Z: Budokai Tenkaichi 3 - Kid Goku, Goku (GT), Kid/Teen Gohan
- Dragon Ball Z: Burst Limit - Kid/Teen Gohan
- Dragon Ball Z: Dokkan Battle - Goku (Mini), Teen Gohan (archive recordings)
- Dragon Ball Z: Harukanaru Densetsu - Kid/Teen Gohan
- Dragon Ball Z: Infinite World - Goku (GT), Kid/Teen Gohan
- Dragon Ball Z: Kakarot - Goku (Mini)
- Dragon Ball Z: Sagas - Kid/Teen Gohan
- Dragon Ball Z: Shin Budokai - Teen Gohan
- Dragon Ball Z: Shin Budokai - Another Road - Teen Gohan
- Dragon Ball Z: Supersonic Warriors - Teen Gohan
- Dragon Ball Z: Supersonic Warriors 2 - Teen Gohan
- Dragon Ball Z: Ultimate Tenkaichi - Kid/Teen Gohan (archive recordings)
- Super Dragon Ball Z - Teen Gohan
- Dragon Ball Legends - Goku (Mini)
- Dragon Ball Raging Blast - Kid/Teen Gohan
- Dragon Ball Xenoverse 2 - Goku (Mini)

=== Other appearances ===
==== Anime dubbing ====
- Beet the Vandel Buster - Additional Voices
- Blue Gender - Additional Voices
- Burst Angel - Additional Voices
- Case Closed - Marlena Xanderbilt (Ep. 101-102)
- Dragon Ball series - East Kai, Trunks (Baby), Miss Beakman/Hamilton, Idasa, Ikose's Mother, Cargo, Angel, Chiobi
- Fruits Basket (2001) - Ari (Ep. 21)
- The Galaxy Railways - Charlie (Ep. 8)
- Gravion Zwei - Faye Xin Yu
- Hakugei: Legend of the Moby Dick - Atre
- Hell Girl - Bully (Ep. 25)
- Kanon (2006) - Alarm Clock (Ep. 2, 18), Track Team Girl 2 (Ep. 2), Track Girls, Classmates (Ep. 2), Chatty Girls, Kimono Girls, Waitress (Ep. 1)
- Kiddy Grade - Additional Voices
- Kodocha - Additional Voices
- Lupin the 3rd: Missed by a Dollar - Cynthia Fullerton
- Parasite Dolls - Eve
- Pumpkin Scissors - Royal Maid (Ep. 2), Proprietress (Ep. 9)
- Yu Yu Hakusho - Dark Tournament Intercom (Ep. 36-37), Keiko's Friend (Ep. 1-2), Nurse (Ep. 73), Shishi Fangirl (Blu-ray; Ep. 47), Takai (originally; ep 73)

== Misc. ==
- Sound Ideas - Cartoon, Cat - Meow, Animal 03 (1989)
- Chuck E. Cheese's - Helen Henny (1994-1995)
