= Diane Zamora =

American midshipman and murderer (born 1978)

- Born: Diane Michelle Zamora; January 21, 1978 (age 48); Crowley, Texas, U.S.
- Occupation: Former U.S. Navy midshipman
- Status: Incarcerated
- Conviction: Capital murder
- Penalty: Life imprisonment (minimum of 40 years)

Details
- Imprisoned at: Dr. Lane Murray Unit

Diane Michelle Zamora (born January 21, 1978) is a former United States Naval Academy midshipman who in 1995, murdered Adrianne Jessica Jones, who she believed was a romantic rival for her ex-fiancé and accomplice, David Graham. Graham had confessed to Zamora that he had given Adrianne a ride home and also to having had sex with her one month earlier, leading an enraged Zamora to demand that he kill Jones. In the early morning of December 4, 1995, Graham picked up Jones in Zamora's car while she hid in the hatchback. They went to a remote location and got into a struggle, at which point Zamora hit Jones over the head with a dumbbell weight, and Graham shot her twice after she broke away from them.

Following the murder, Graham attended the United States Air Force Academy in Colorado Springs, Colorado, while Zamora attended the United States Naval Academy in Annapolis, Maryland. Zamora confessed the crime to her roommates, which ultimately led to notification of the local police in Texas, where the murder occurred. Both Zamora and Graham were arrested on September 6, 1996. They were both convicted in separate trials and are currently serving life sentences. Zamora's attorney filed an appeal in 2005, stating that prosecution withheld the information that Graham did not give Jones a ride after the meet, and probably did not have sex with Jones.

== Murder of Adrianne Jones ==
=== Background ===
Diane Zamora and David Graham met at a Civil Air Patrol meeting at Spinks Airport, near Crowley, Texas, when they were both aged 14. Zamora had wanted to be an astronaut and Graham wanted to be a pilot. The two began dating about four years later in August 1995, when they were both high school honor students. Zamora was a student at Crowley High School, and Graham was a student at Mansfield High School. About a month after they began dating, Zamora and Graham announced their engagement to their families. They planned to marry after their college graduations.

Graham went to school with Adrianne Jones, who was on the cross-country track team with him. Jones, known to her acquaintances as A.J., was an honor student who planned to attend Texas A&M University and become a behavioral analyst. Her family included her mother Linda, her father Bill and two brothers. Graham claimed that on November 4, 1995, he had given Jones a ride home from a regional meet and that during the ride he stopped the car to have sex with her. During her confession to police, Zamora said that she believed it was this night when Graham came over to her house, carrying a stuffed animal and having "this look in his eyes that was horrible, he looked so scared."

In Zamora's confession, she stated that about a month later she questioned Graham about other girls, including Jones. They got into a fight when he pressed her to study for the SAT. Graham then said that he had not had sex only with her, but also had sex with Jones. Zamora began screaming and hitting her head against the floor, shouting, "Kill her, kill her!" She said that beginning December 2, they tried to get in touch with Jones, and Graham continually tried to calm Zamora down. In 2008, Graham claimed that Zamora told him that she would kill herself or leave him if he did not kill Jones.

=== The crime ===
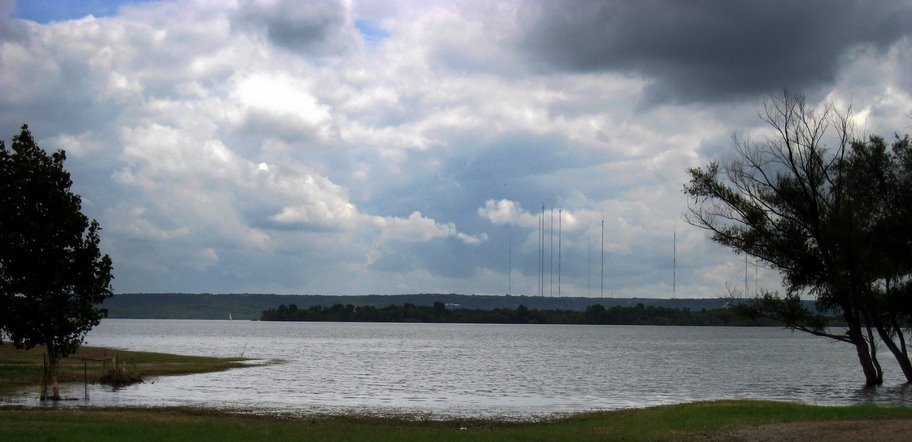
Joe Pool Lake, Dallas, Tarrant and Ellis Counties, Texas

According to Graham, he and Zamora planned to kill Jones and have sex with her dead body and then put her in a lake with weights tied to her body. Graham called Jones on the night of December 3, 1995, and arranged to drive her to Joe Pool Lake while Zamora hid in the hatchback of her car. Zamora said in her confession that they arrived at a spot by the lake after 12:30 a.m. on December 4, 1995. She said that when Graham stopped the car she came out from the hatchback and asked Jones whether she had had sex with Graham. She claimed Jones said that she had, but hadn't enjoyed it because she felt guilty. Zamora became enraged. Zamora and Graham both said in their confessions that they got into a struggle, Zamora hit Jones on the head with a dumbbell weight, and Jones fought back. She got out of the car and ran into a field. Graham shot her twice with a 9mm handgun after she fell down. According to Zamora's confession, when he returned to the car, Graham said, "I love you, baby, do you believe me now?" Shortly thereafter, Zamora asked what they had just done, to which David answered, "I don't know. I can't believe we just did that". They cleaned up and disposed of their bloody clothes and went home. Zamora and Graham each said that she then cleaned her car that had blood in it, and that at that time Graham was vomiting. She wrote in her calendar for the day, "Adrianne 01:38 a.m."

=== The investigation and arrest ===
Jones' body was found in an open field on Seeton Road, near Joe Pool Lake, on December 4, 1995. Her unidentified body was brought to the medical examiner as a Jane Doe. It did not appear that she had been sexually assaulted, and it was clear that she had been shot and had a "blunt traumatic head injury." The shooter had stood within a few feet of Jones when pulling the trigger. The second bullet was fired when the killer stood right over her, hitting her right between the eyes. Her body was positively identified to be the missing Adrianne Jones when the medical examiner received a photograph of Jones.

After the murder, Graham went to the Air Force Academy in Colorado Springs and Zamora went to the Naval Academy in Annapolis, Maryland. Nine months after the murder she confessed to it to her two roommates, who contacted the authorities at the academy. The Grand Prairie police were then contacted, and Zamora and Graham were arrested for capital murder on September 6, 1996. They were held in the Tarrant County Jail.

Graham was interrogated for 30 hours, during which he confessed to killing Jones. Zamora also confessed to the murder during her interrogation by police. The key details of the event were similar; each said that Jones was killed because Graham had sex with her, she was taken to a remote lake, and she was hit over the head by Zamora and shot twice by Graham.

Both later recanted their confessions. Graham said that he was not guilty of killing Jones, but helped cover up the murder, which he claimed Zamora committed by herself. Zamora claimed that Graham committed the murder by himself. A 9mm handgun, alleged to be the murder weapon, was found in the attic, which could be reached through David Graham's bedroom.

The police had investigated the case for nine months. Law enforcement officials associated with the case have stated that the sexual encounter between Graham and Jones did not happen, but was invented by Graham. Sgt. Alan Patton of the Grand Prairie Police Department stated: "For those who don't remember, this was a totally brutal, unnecessary murder. David had lied to Diane about an alleged sexual tryst that never happened with Adrianne Jones. If he had said, 'I was just kidding, I was just trying to make you jealous,' Adrianne Jones would still be alive today". However, Graham has since claimed that his original confession was accurate, and the only reason he lied about the sexual encounter not happening was because of his defense lawyer's advice.

=== The trial ===
Zamora's two-week trial began in February 1998 in Fort Worth with Judge Joe Drago presiding. Linda Jones, Adrianne's mother, asked that the death penalty be removed as a sentencing option from both trials.

During the trial, Zamora admitted to being at the scene of the crime, but denied participating in the killing of Jones. The Naval Academy midshipmen to whom Zamora confessed and another witness stated that she showed no remorse over Jones' death.

The case received national media attention, providing Court TV with some of its highest ratings ever in its film coverage of the trial. Some of the interest centered on whether Zamora was the submissive victim or the jealous driving force behind the murder. Under Texas law, murder is the intentional killing of another human being, while capital murder includes murder with an underlying felony of kidnapping, robbery, aggravated sexual assault, arson, or obstruction. In this case, the prosecutor believed that Jones was deceptively lured from her home by Graham asking her for a bogus date, or she would not have been in the car. Moreover, the couple committed obstruction when Zamora allegedly ordered Graham to stalk Jones into the field and to shoot her so that she could not tell the authorities.

The jury was asked to deliberate on the charges of capital murder or the lesser charges of assault, kidnapping, or false imprisonment. On February 17, 1998, after more than six hours of deliberations over two days, the jury found Zamora guilty of capital murder in the death of Adrianne Jones. Because of the Jones family's request that prosecutors not seek the death penalty against her, Zamora received a mandatory sentence of life imprisonment and would be eligible for parole after 40 years.

On July 24, 1998, after a separate trial, a jury found Graham guilty of capital murder. During the trial, Wendy Bartlett, also on the track team, and Coach Lee Ann Burke stated that Bartlett was the one who drove Jones home after the meet on November 4, 1995, and that Graham had left earlier, leaving Jones and Bartlett to put away equipment from the meet. Graham did not drive Jones home on the night he claimed to have had sex with her, lending credence to his later recantation. However, he ultimately repudiated his recantation, saying his lawyer had pressured him to lie, and again claimed to have had sex with Jones. Adding that to Zamora's story about Jones admitting to having had sex with Graham when Zamora asked her about it just before the murder, it might be that Graham and Jones had sex at some other time. He was sentenced to life imprisonment.

David Richards, Zamora's attorney, used the testimony from Bartlett and Burke as the basis of an appeal for Zamora. The petition, made in 2005, stated that the prosecution withheld this information during Zamora's trial. "From these witnesses, the state knew, and should have known, that the testimony it sponsored in support of a sexual encounter between Jones and Graham was probably false". In 2015, Tarrant County authorities chose to keep the paper court documents of the case as historical documents even though they have been digitized due to the prominence of the case.

=== Incarceration ===
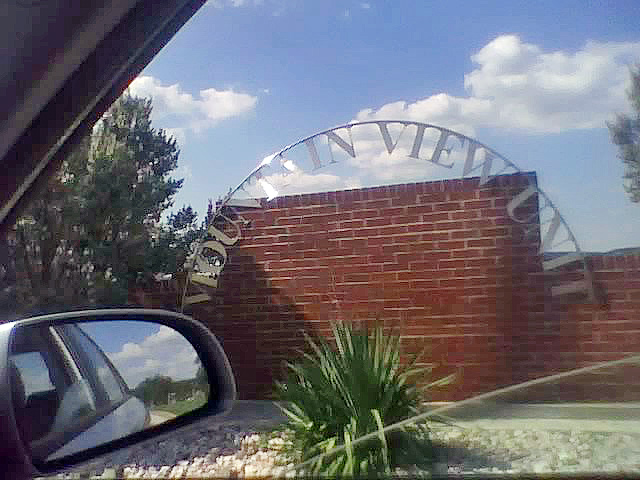
Mountain View Unit, Gatesville, Texas, where Zamora was imprisoned.

Zamora was transferred from a jail in Fort Worth, Texas to the Texas Department of Criminal Justice. She was initially held in a state prison diagnostic unit in Gatesville, Texas in February 1998, then held at the Murray Unit, also in Gatesville. At one point she was held in protective custody at Mountain View Unit in Gatesville, but she was later moved to the general prison population in the William P. Hobby Unit near Marlin. As of 2022 she is back in protective custody in the Lane Murray Unit. Zamora, opposed to her placement, filed a civil rights complaint with the 5th U.S. Circuit Court of Appeals, but the complaint was dismissed.

Graham was held at the Ellis Unit near Huntsville after the trial. In 2016 he was held at the Darrington Unit near Rosharon. As of 2018 he is held at the Allred Unit in Wichita Falls. He is currently enrolled at the Southwest Baptist Theological Seminary's inmate seminary in order to become a pastor behind bars. In 2008, Graham said that his confession to the police was correct and expressed remorse for killing Jones. He also said that if he had it to do over again he would have pleaded guilty to murder.

== Marriage ==
Zamora got to know Steven Mora, a fellow Texas inmate, through the mail. He had committed auto theft and burglary and was in prison for threatening someone related to one of his cases. Although they never met in person, the two decided to get married and petitioned Bexar County for a marriage license in 2003. A wedding ceremony was performed on June 17, 2003. Zamora's mother and a male friend stood in for the imprisoned couple in the county's first proxy marriage, which was performed by a judge in San Antonio. They were divorced in or around 2008.

== 2007 interview ==
Zamora was interviewed by Stone Phillips on Dateline in a show broadcast in April 2007. Her appeals were exhausted, and with her lawyer's permission she took a polygraph test administered by Dateline. Her new story was that Graham and she had been breaking up, and that Graham was using the murder to "tie her to him". She noted that she obstructed justice by cleaning the car afterwards and was an accessory after the fact; however, Zamora pointed out that the jury had convicted her of intending to kill Jones, which she denied. When she took the polygraph, the administrator repeatedly told her to stop her exaggerated breathing, a counter-measure for such tests. He said that he believed he had enough to actually say that Zamora had failed the crucial question on whether she had intended to kill Jones. Two other independent polygraph administrators, who were not at the test, were contacted by Dateline and asked to review the results; they said that they could offer no opinion due to counter-measures. Zamora responded to Phillips that she was nervous and hyperventilating despite being told all the questions in advance and reviewing them with the administrator before the test.

== Popular culture ==
- In 1996, Ellise Pierce of the Dallas Observer wrote that the crime "has become part of Mansfield teen folklore; kids obsess about the details of the crime as if they were unraveling a plot from The X-Files".
- Before Zamora's trial began, the case was the subject of a 1997 made-for-television movie called Love's Deadly Triangle: The Texas Cadet Murder. Zamora was played by Holly Marie Combs.
- Two books were written about the case.

* A. W. Gray (1997). The Cadet Murder Case: A True Story of Teen Love and Deadly Revenge (Onyx True Crime). NAL. ISBN 9780451408099.

* Meyer, Peter (April 1, 2011). Blind Love: The True Story of the Texas Cadet Murder. St. Martin's Press. ISBN 9781429938020.

- Zamora and Graham's crime was discussed at length in the American Justice episode "Duty, Honor, and Murder", which aired in 1999.
- The crime was covered by People Magazine Investigates on December 12, 2016, the episode was called In the Name of Love.
- The Cold Case first-season episode "Love Conquers Al" is based on this murder.
