= Genene Jones =

American serial killer (born 1950)

- TDCJ (Bexar County) inmate mugshot, 2017
- Born: Genene Ann Jones; July 13, 1950 (age 76); Texas, U.S.
- Status: Incarcerated at Dr. Lane Murray Unit
- Spouses: James Harvey DeLany Jr. (m. 1968; div. 1974) Garron Ray Turk (m. 1983; sep. 1984)
- Children: 2
- Convictions: Felony murder (2 counts); Attempted murder (1 count)
- Penalty: 99 years in prison with triple credit (May 14, 1984 in McClellan's murder); 60 years in prison (October 24, 1984 in the attempted murder of Rolando Santos); 20 years to life in prison (January 16, 2020 plea agreement on Joshua Sawyer's murder)

Details
- Victims: 2 convicted 60+ confessed and suspected
- Span of crimes: Early 1970s – 1982
- Country: United States
- State: Texas
- Date apprehended: May 24, 1983 (for a final time)

Genene Ann Jones (born July 13, 1950) is an American former licensed vocational nurse and confessed serial killer, (Note: Jones confessed in a 1998 parole hearing that she killed babies by injecting them with different drugs, with the crimes occurring mostly in and around San Antonio and in Kerrville, Texas, between the early 1970s and her arrest in 1983. She confessed again in a parole hearing letter in 2011. (See details of her plea bargain)) currently serving a sentence of life in prison for the murder of an 11-month-old baby boy in 1981. She was previously convicted in 1984 for the murder of a 15-month-old baby girl and sentenced to 99 years in prison.

In 2017, prosecutors in Bexar County, Texas, found out that Jones was on path to be released in March 2018 due to an old state law aimed at relieving prison overcrowding. In response, district attorney Nico LaHood created a task force to investigate cold cases and prevent Jones from leaving prison. She was ultimately charged in May 2017 with the murder of five babies who died at the Bexar County Hospital in the early 1980s. Jones initially pleaded not guilty, but accepted a plea deal in January 2020 and pleaded guilty to one of those counts (the murder of Joshua Sawyer) in exchange for the remaining charges to be dismissed and avoid a trial by jury, as well as recovering personal belongings taken from her prison cell as evidentiary proof.

Jones was sentenced in the Sawyer murder case on January 16, 2020, to life in prison with no parole eligibility for 20 years.

== Early life ==
=== Youth ===
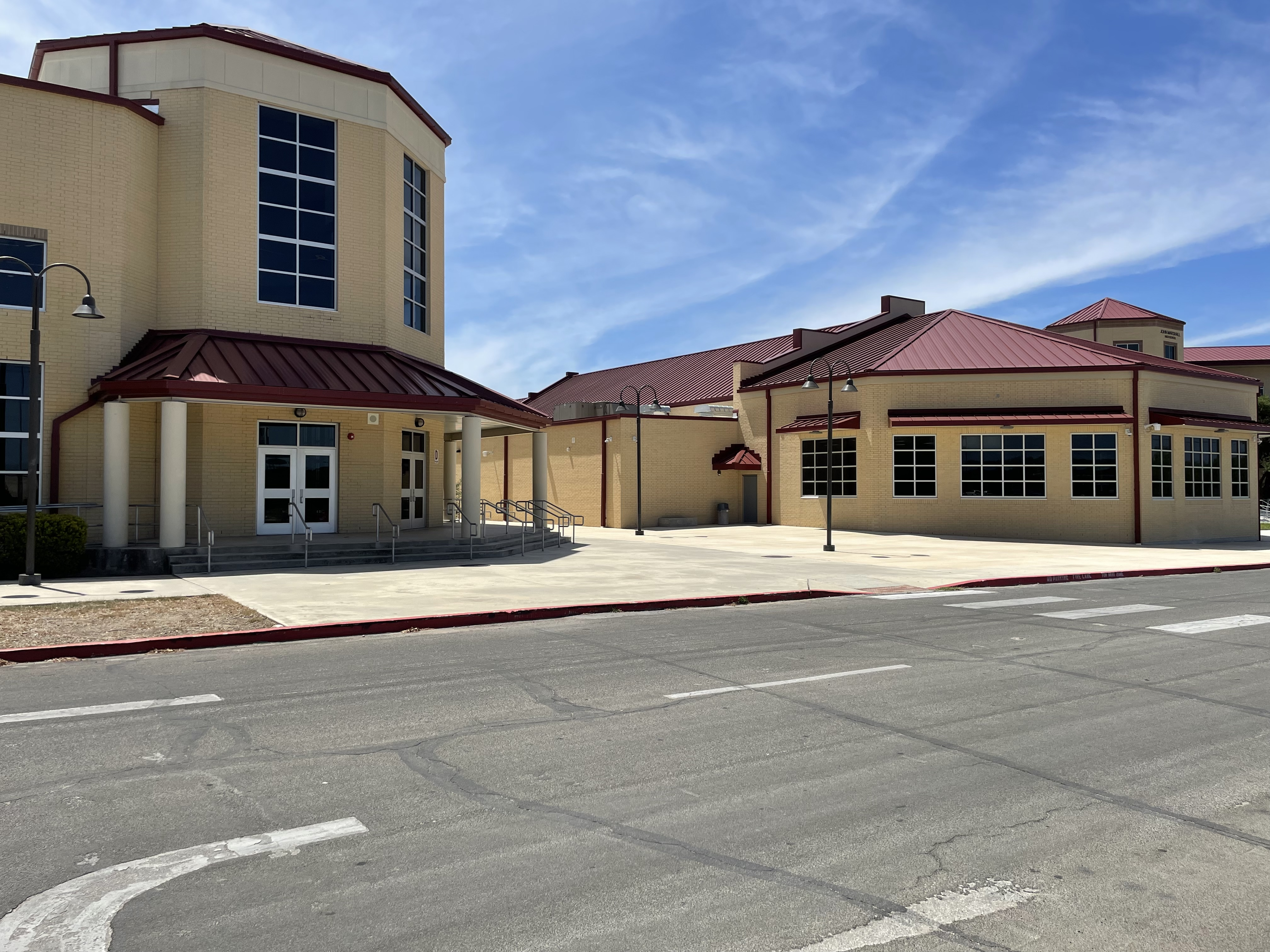
Jones attended John Marshall High School in San Antonio, from where she graduated in June 1968

Born in Texas in July 1950, Genene Jones was adopted by Richard Jefferson "Dick" Jones and his wife Gladys. She grew up in the San Antonio area and attended John Marshall High School in San Antonio, where she used to work in the library. After Jones' arrest in 1983, the school's librarian claimed that she was "different", comparing Jones with the other kids and saying that she kept a "bossy" authority over others and had a low patience with the typical teenage games and pranks. Jones showed early signs of emotional and psychological problems despite having a good relationship with her adoptive parents. She was known for fabricating illnesses and displaying troubling behaviors, including manipulative rhetoric to seek attention through the suffering of others.

Dick Jones was a well known businessman in the San Antonio area. In the early 1960s, he bought a property on Fredericksburg Road (near TX State Highway Spur 345) and built a nightclub named the Kit Kat Swim Club. The building included a dancing floor, a patio, and a pool. Young Jones enjoyed spending time with her father and helped him in painting billboards and placing advertisements around Bexar County. However, shortly before her 18th birthday, she lost two brothers, one of whom died when an improvised explosive device he had built exploded in his hands. Dick Jones also died shortly before her birthday, from a short illness in January 1968. He was 56 years old at the time.

=== First marriage and nursing career ===
When Jones graduated from high school in June 1968, she married a high school classmate – James Harvey DeLany Jr. – and had also enrolled at a beauty school. She began working at the Methodist Hospital beauty parlor in San Antonio soon after getting a certification as a beautician. While working at the beauty parlor, DeLany was drafted into the Navy, forcing the family to relocate to Albany, Georgia, and Jones to resign from her job. During their time in Georgia, the couple had a son – Richard Michael – who was born in January 1972.

The marriage between Jones and DeLany, however, quickly began to fall apart that same year. In August 1972, Jones returned to Texas and filed for divorce in Bexar County. She told the judge that DeLany had a bad temper and accused him of physical violence. The judge ultimately dismissed the suit two months later when Jones and DeLany reconciled and she reversed her statements. Less than two years later, in March 1974, Jones filed again for divorce, this time pushing for a definitive settlement. The divorce was granted in June 1974 and a bitter legal battle ensued between Jones and DeLany, lasting nearly three years. In their crossed accusations, Jones filed charges against DeLany for failing to pay their son's child support and DeLany responded with another lawsuit, claiming that Jones violated visitation rights terms. In August 1976, Jones won a contempt citation litigation against DeLany and the lawsuits continued until they were asked to hold a mediation and end their legal battles. They agreed and desisted from pursuing any other case against each other. Four months after the end of their legal battles, Jones had a second child, Heather, whom she initially declared in a deposition to have been conceived from a relationship with a man named Ron English who had died out of state. In a private conversation with one of her bosses several years later, Jones admitted that the girl had been the result of a "quick reconciliation" with DeLany in the midst of their legal battles.

In mid-1977, Jones moved in to her mother's home and joined the San Antonio Independent School District to pursue a career in nursing. She kept a remarkable academic record, getting grades above approval points. In her licensing exam in October 1977, Jones scored more than 200 points above the passing grade. Later that year, she took her first job as a nurse at the Methodist Hospital, where she was asked to resign after having a conflict with a doctor. Her second job came as an employee of the South Texas Medical Center, where she worked in the obstetric unit. After three months at the South Texas facility, Jones resigned to have a minor surgery and to be able to rest. She went back to work in October 1978 upon answering an ad from the Bexar County Hospital (now known as University Health), which hired Jones as part of the vocational nurses staff, placing her tasks at the pediatric intensive care unit (PICU), where she was required to work with critically ill newborns and babies.

== Suspected criminal activity ==
=== First cases (1978–1981) ===
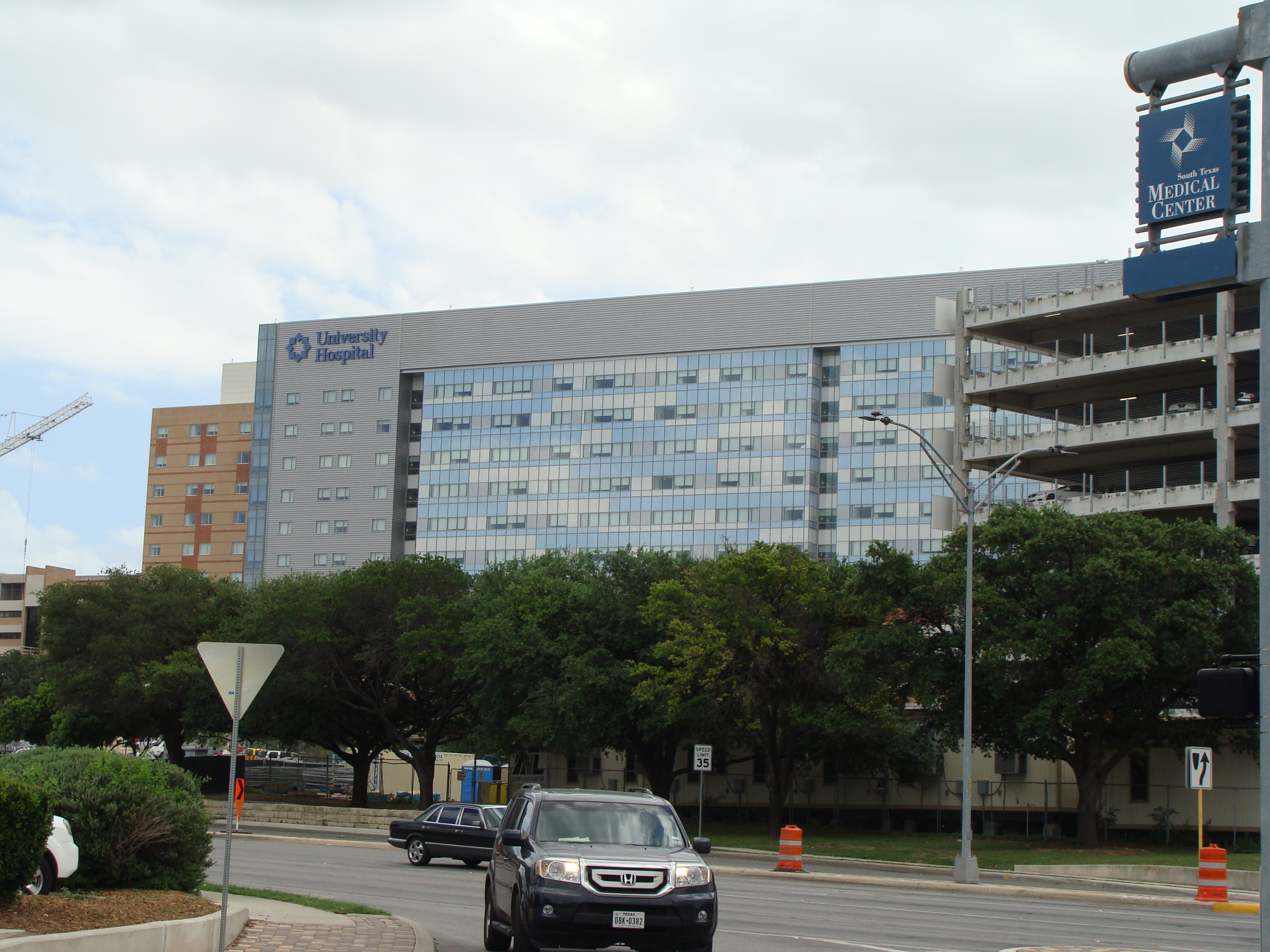
University Health in September 2012; then known as the Bexar County Hospital, where Genene Jones was employed as a nurse between 1978 and 1982

Jones initially worked the 11 p.m.–7 a.m. shift during her first three months at Bexar County Hospital. She later switched to the slot of 3 p.m.–11 p.m., where she was under the mentorship of registered nurse (RN) Cherlyn Pendergraft. At Jones's trial in 1984, Pendergraft testified that during the time she worked with Genene Jones, a six-day-old boy died from complications of necrotizing enterocolitis. Pendergraft, who was used to dealing with such situations, recalled that Jones "went berserk" over the boy's death, sobbing and staring at his body until hospital workers took the baby's corpse away to the facility's morgue.

Pendergraft added that, as time passed, Jones gained confidence and eventually became a strong presence in the nursing staff, also saying that some of her colleagues disliked Jones's condescending attitudes and some conversations where she boasted about her sexual experiences and future life plans. Nurses who worked with Jones said that she liked to tease others about their allegedly lower medical knowledge, often criticizing decisions made by the doctors and exposing what she thought were medical mistakes. Some other personnel reported that Jones held a strong and particular contempt for doctors, enjoying her frequent confrontations with young interns, whom she was known to challenge in their opinions. According to doctors who worked on her shifts, Jones used to question drug dosages and the prescribed medications for the patients, with an intern saying that Jones called him and other physicians so many times over minimal issues that she had become known among doctors to be a "real pain in the ass".

On the morning of May 21, 1981, 15-month-old Christopher James Hogeda died from cardiac arrest. The baby had been hospitalized at Bexar for six months prior to his death due to congenital heart problems, pneumonia and diarrhea. In a similar pattern to several other deaths, Jones showed a strong emotional reaction to the boy's death, crying and holding the child's body in her arms, and reaffirming that Hogeda was "her boy". Four months later, on September 16, 1981, two-year-old Rosemary Vega suffered a sudden decompensation and died after having a massive cardiac arrest while awaiting preparations for a common and unrisky operation in the heart. The girl's mother, Rosemary Cantu, was 18 years old at the time and worked in the housekeeping department of Bexar. She testified that Jones came into the room and injected the girl with an unknown substance as Rosemary sat on her mother's lap. When Cantu asked Jones what the drug was for, she responded that it was a medication for the girl "to [get] rest". Rosemary Vega entered into a sudden and unexplained shock shortly after Jones left the room, displaying symptoms of irregular breathing, which activated the PICU code blue. Confused by the child's abrupt crisis, doctors administered different reverse mechanisms in the emergency resuscitation procedures. These attempts failed and Rosemary Vega died within minutes.

By late 1981, the hospital registered an unusual death rate at the PICU. The facility's authorities had suspicions that Genene Jones could be harming babies, but their investigation proved inconclusive. The report alleged that even though ten baby deaths had occurred under Jones's watch, they could have been the product of a coincidence, while not fully discarding the possibility of negligence or wrongdoings by Jones. Despite the concerns, Jones continued to work at Bexar's PICU as more children suffered unexplained and abrupt health crises. Rumors began to spread among the nursing staff; Jones's colleagues began calling her shift the "Death Shift", though most – except for a nurse named Suzanna Maldonado – believed that it was "bad luck" instead of deliberate acts of harming children. On October 10, 1981, six-month-old Jose Antonio Flores died after suffering from an uncontrollable bleeding. Despite a 52-minute attempt to resuscitate him and the unusually violent nature of the baby's death, no autopsy was conducted on Flores's body. A handwritten record from the day of the boy's death highlighted that Genene Jones was present during the emergency brain scans immediately after the child decompensated, and that his health worsened even further shortly afterwards. On December 22, 1981, Doraelia Rios, a 25-month-old girl, died soon after Jones took up the PICU shift. The baby was recovering from a gastrointestinal surgery when she abruptly decompensated. On the day of the girl's death, Jones left a note on the nursing book, addressing Doraelia directly and wishing her a Merry Christmas.

=== Final months at Bexar Hospital (1982) ===
Four-week old Rolando Santos had been admitted to the PICU at Bexar on December 27, 1981, due to persisting respiratory problems. Three days later, Santos suffered a sudden seizure and nearly died. Ken Copeland, a young pediatric endocrinologist who was aware of the rumors circulating among the staff, ordered multiple tests on the boy to determine the origin of the seizure. As brain scans showed nothing unusual, Copeland refused to authorize the baby's transfer back to PICU and asked for a blood test, specifically requesting the lab to find whether heparin (a blood thinner) was present in the boy's system. The results came that same day, showing abnormal levels of heparin in the blood. Concerned, Copeland asked the administration to take action and investigate the incident, but no measure was taken by the hospital. On January 10, 1982, Santos – who remained at PICU due to his breathing problems – suffered another severe decompensation, but with the doctors who assisted him being aware of Santos's previous heparin poisoning, they quickly administered a dose of protamine sulfate (a drug used to reverse the effects of heparin). Santos responded positively and fully recovered. After stabilizing him in another unit, the boy was returned to PICU on January 12. That morning, Copeland expressed concern that the child remained there and asked the shift's nurses to move him out of PICU and to place him under watch in the general pediatric unit. When Copeland returned in the afternoon and saw that Santos was still at PICU, he angrily reprimanded the nurses and personally transferred the baby out to another unit.

Deaths and unusual health crises kept happening in January 1982, with four-month-old Patrick Zavala dying unexpectedly on January 17 following a successful operation on a pulmonary artery. Zavala did not show signs of any postoperatory complication and began having an irregular heartbeat in the evening shift, suffering a fatal cardiac arrest later in the night. After Zavala's death, medical personnel became angry about the number of infants that had unexpectedly died. Surgeons were particularly furious at the sudden decompensations that their patients had been experiencing following successful operations. Nurses were also upset, with three of them staying until the next morning to witness Zavala's autopsy. Chest surgeon Kent Trinkle and another doctor convened an urgent meeting with administrators and summoned medical school deans and other district officials. Their primary action was locking away supplies of heparin under close supervision. On February 15, the medical committee agreed that Genene Jones was the main target of their speculation, but the opinion on whether to fire her was divided. The committee decided to put Jones under stricter controls and relieve her from taking care of the most critical cases, which was Jones's specialization area at PICU. Two months later, in March 1982, the hospital ultimately decided to scale down the personnel at PICU and replaced all vocational nurses with RNs. The decision not to fire Jones was later reported to be influenced by the administration's fears that a civil lawsuit would be raised against the hospital.

After the dismissal of vocational nurses from PICU, the hospital offered them a place in other medical units at the facility. Jones, who said that she loved pediatric nursing, declined the offer and resigned. Soon after that, she began working at the office of pediatrician Kathleen Holland in Kerrville, Texas. Holland, a native of Albany, New York, had graduated as a doctor from the University of Texas Health Science Center and had previously worked in San Antonio before settling in Kerrville to pursue a career at the Sid Peterson Memorial Hospital. While Holland tried to recruit RNs for her practice, she was told by one of her prospective employees that hiring vocational nurses in the beginning would be far cheaper. In late 1981, Holland had spoken with Genene Jones about her projects in Kerrville, with Holland being one of the few interns that Jones admired and liked. The reason for that dynamic was based on Holland's not objecting to Jones's constant questions and confiding in her judgement about patients, saying that "if [Genene] says that something is going to go wrong [...] it usually does".

When Holland decided that Jones would be among her choices to employ, she was approached by a pediatrician friend who asked her if she was sure about hiring Jones. Holland told the doctor that she did not believe the accusations against Jones, comparing her to an inoffensive puppy. Nonetheless, Holland contacted several physicians who had worked with Jones and asked for advice. While most of the opinions were either favorable or neutral, one stood out as negative: young pediatrician James Robotham, an associate professor at the University of Texas, urged Holland to reconsider incorporating Jones into her staff. Robotham and Jones had initially gotten along at Bexar, but Robotham grew suspicious about her actions in the months leading up to her dismissal. In the meantime, Jones had moved around, working for a nursing agency in San Antonio and a few months at the Christus Santa Rosa Health System in San Marcos, Texas.

By August 1982, Jones was working full time for Holland despite not renewing her license before the state's board of nursing.

== Murder of Chelsea McClellan ==
Chelsea McClellan was the first known murder victim of Genene Jones

Chelsea McClellan was born in June 1981 to Patti and Reid McClellan. The girl was born prematurely and developed infant respiratory distress syndrome as a consequence. In early 1982, Chelsea had spent time at a San Antonio hospital, where she was treated for respiratory problems, making a successful and full recovery. On August 24, 1982, Patti and Reid McClellan took their daughter to doctor Kathleen Holland's office in Kerrville after noticing that the girl had trouble breathing. During the post-evaluation talk with the McClellans, Genene Jones took Chelsea away, saying that she would take the girl to play with her so Holland and the McClellans could talk without interruptions. Less than five minutes later, Jones returned and urgently asked Holland to go with her to the treatment room, where the child was lying on an examination table, suffering from an apparent seizure. Jones placed a respiratory bag on the girl's mouth and began pumping air into her lungs. Holland subsequently ordered her to administer Chelsea with 80 milligrams of phenytoin (an anticonvulsant medication) through a hastily improvised IV line in the girl's scalp. The office's secretary, Gwen Grantner, called an ambulance, which took Chelsea to hospital, where she remained for nine days in the ICU. Upon their daughter's discharge, Patti and Reid McClellan praised Holland and Jones, crediting them with saving Chelsea's life.

On September 17, 1982, Patti McClellan took her daughter to Holland's office to have Chelsea's general health checked following the decompensation the previous month. She claimed Holland had requested it, although Holland denied this. When Patti McClellan arrived, Holland asked Jones to give the girl various inoculations. Jones injected the girl twice with succinylcholine, a strong muscle relaxant. According to Patti, her daughter began showing serious trouble breathing and began violently convulsing. An ambulance was called to the office and Holland ordered that Chelsea be taken to a San Antonio hospital for neurological tests. In the ambulance, the girl was accompanied by a paramedic holding the IV bag and Genene Jones, who was tasked with checking Chelsea's vitals. Kathleen Holland and the McClellans drove behind the ambulance in separate vehicles. On the way to the hospital, Jones gave Chelsea another injection of succinylcholine, severely worsening her condition and causing a flat line on the monitors. Attempts to resuscitate Chelsea proved unsuccessful, and she died at a small medical facility nearby. Due to her previous decompensations, which had not been directly attributed to Jones at the time, no immediate suspicion arose and the cause of death was not determined. Holland signed the death certificate under "origin of [cause of] death unknown". Jones returned that day to Kerrville, working the afternoon shift at Holland's office.

Devastated by their daughter's death, the McClellans posted a two-column advertisement in a Kerrville newspaper, thanking Kathleen Holland and Genene Jones for "their sensitivity while treating Chelsea during [her] final moments".

== Subsequent crimes and relocation to San Angelo ==
After the murder of Chelsea McClellan, Jones became more impulsive, disorganized and deliberate in her attacks. She is suspected of killing a seven-year-old boy named Jimmy Pearson. The boy, who suffered from a severe intellectual disability and was unable to speak, suffered uncontrollable seizures on August 30, 1982, and was rushed to Kerrville hospital. On that same day, four-month-old Christopher Parker was taken to Holland's office, where he suffered a sudden seizure. Parker was rushed to hospital soon after Pearson, with Jones attacking Pearson again there by injecting another dose of what is believed to be succinylcholine. Parker survived and Pearson briefly recovered, only to die from complications of these induced crises on October 21, 1982.

On September 23, 1982, Jones injected a five-month-old baby girl, Rolinda Ruff, with succinylcholine, a medication unprescribed to the girl, causing a severe health crisis and paralysis. The doctors who received Rolinda at the hospital, aware of previous incidents coming from Holland's private practice, decided to hold an emergency meeting and placed the baby under watch. An anaesthesiologist who helped stabilize the girl detected traits of poisoning compatible with succinylcholine and alerted the facility's board.

That afternoon, doctor Duan Packard met with a young surgeon named Joe Vinas. They both agreed to track Jones's background and Vinas called a resident surgeon in the Medical Hospital Center in San Antonio that afternoon. Vinas told the resident about the unusual incidents at a medical office in Kerrville, to which Vinas's colleague responded by informing him of similar cases at the San Antonio hospital PICU the year prior. The resident promised to find out the nurse's name and call back. The man phoned Vinas less than five minutes later; when Vinas asked if the nurse's name was Genene Jones, the resident replied: "[you] have a baby killer on your hands".

Investigations progressed slowly, and Kathleen Holland herself began to question Jones's performances at work. She asked Jones to make it clear why the lid of a bottle of succinylcholine was punctured, and questioned her on whether she had placed a pharmacy order for a third bottle (Holland had requested two) of that same drug. Jones was evasive and, days later, on September 24, she went to work and told Holland that she had just taken an overdose of doxepin (an antidepressant). Holland called an ambulance and Jones was hospitalized, with doctors performing a stomach pumping to clean her system of the drug. When Jones returned to work on September 28, Holland told her that she was no longer required to work with her. The next day, as the investigation advanced, Jones and Holland were taken to Austin to be subjected to a polygraph test, which Jones did not pass. Holland subsequently fired her and Jones moved away to a mobile home on a ranch in San Angelo, Texas.

Jones kept a low profile as detectives investigated her past; different physicians and medical school deans presented evidence to a grand jury in San Antonio accusing Jones of deliberate wrongdoings. Jones was briefly arrested in November 1982 and later released on bail awaiting indictment into more cases. In April 1983, while awaiting trial, Jones married a 19-year-old nursing aide named Garron Ray Turk, who initially believed in her innocence.

== Arrest, trial and incarceration ==
Jones was arrested for a final time at her home in San Angelo on May 24, 1983, formally charged with the murder of Chelsea McClellan, and taken to a county jail in Williamson County, where she awaited her first court appearance. Jones pleaded not guilty on a May 27 arraignment and was remanded in custody on a $225,000 bond ($727,322 in 2025) in Williamson County custody. The judge presiding over Jones's murder case was John Carter (who served since 2013 in the U.S. House of Representatives), granting Jones with a change of venue to Georgetown after defense counsels requested the trial to be taken away from Kerrville. Jones was found guilty by a jury in February 1984 and convicted in the McClellan murder. In May of that year, she was sentenced to 99 years in prison with triple credit. Carter said in a 2013 interview that he was aware that Jones would be released early due to the 1977 amendment to Texas law allowing early release aimed at prison overcrowding relief, but that the jurors were not aware of that law and could not be informed beforehand. Carter added that many of them were angry and upset when they found out that Jones would not spend the rest of her life in prison.

After the McClellan conviction, prosecutors brought new charges against Jones, indicting her in the attempted murder of six children by deliberately injecting them with harmful doses of medications. Subsequent investigations showed that during Jones's shifts, patients had ten times more probability of dying or suffering a decompensation, an algorithm that was not made while she was employed at Bexar County Hospital. She was convicted in June 1984 on one of the counts – the attempted murder of Rolando Santos – to whom she gave an injection of the blood thinner medication heparin on at least three occasions between December 1981 and January 1982. For that count of attempted murder, Jones was sentenced to a concurrent term of 60 years in prison, remaining out of the spotlight in the following years, while incarcerated at the Dr. Lane Murray Unit in Gatesville, Texas. In a 1998 parole hearing and after denying any criminal action for years, Jones confessed to injecting babies with harmful intent and admitted guilt in the McClellan murder case. In a 2011 letter to the Texas Board of Pardons and Paroles, Jones again confessed to killing an unspecified number of babies, writing that what "[I] did was heinous" and alleging that the only explanation she could find to her crimes was that she "was not sound of mind anytime before 1994 [when] I found [God's] wisdom". Author Peter Elkind, who spoke with her on several occasions about the writing of a book, said in 2011, that Jones not only denied the crimes when he visited her in prison in 1987, but that she also adamantly denied suffering from a mental health disorder and that at the time she had conflicting religious beliefs, switching a Cross for a Star of David on her chest and that she reported to be converting to Judaism.

=== 2017 charges and plea deal ===
News about Jones' release began to surface in 2013 and intensified by May 2017, when prosecutors in Bexar County announced that they were investigating cold cases to prevent Jones from leaving prison as scheduled for May 2018. District Attorney Nico LaHood had formed a task force in 2015 to investigate Genene Jones, vowing to keep her in prison. In August 2014, the Texas Board of Pardons and Paroles denied Jones parole and indicated that the panel would not review her case before 2018. In June 2017, the district attorney's office indicted Jones in the murders of Joshua Sawyer, Rosemary Vega, Richard Nelson, Patrick Zavala, and Paul Edward Villareal, all of them committed at the San Antonio PICU. Patti and Reid McClellan personally campaigned against Jones's release, with Patti telling Anderson Cooper during an interview on CNN in August 2013 that Jones would "do it again" and urging families whose babies died or suffered unusual crises at San Antonio's PICU to testify and help build cases against Jones. Patti died in June 2019, before Jones's guilty plea.

Jones was moved from prison in Gatesville to a San Antonio facility in December 2017 to facilitate court appearances on these indictments. She entered a not guilty plea, with Judge Andrew Carruthers ordering, in June 2018, that Jones undergo a psychological evaluation to determine if she was fit to stand trial. Jones' public defender Cornelius Cox argued that due to the long time frame, it was difficult for Jones to "put the puzzle together", but did not comment on whether she was delusional. Jones was held in protective custody at the Bexar County Jail, due to her case being high profile and to avoid interaction with much younger inmates held on unrelated crimes.

Mental health professionals concluded in February 2019 that Jones was competent to stand trial and that she understood reality despite alleging diminished capacity due to having suffered from recent strokes; however, Judge Carruthers granted the defense's motion to have Jones evaluated again by different doctors. Jones revoked her insanity defense and did not attend a competency hearing in September 2019, allowing a potential trial against her to move forward, with Judge Carruthers setting a date for opening statements in January 2020. That month, the prosecution announced that a tentative plea deal had been reached with Jones, who wanted to avoid being subjected to a trial by jury and to have her seized belongings returned to her. Jones finally accepted to plead guilty to one of the counts – the December 1981 murder of Joshua Sawyer – and receive a sentence of life imprisonment in exchange for those benefits. Judge Frank J. Castro approved the deal and set a sentencing hearing for that same day.

On January 16, 2020, an elderly and frail Jones was taken into court in a wheelchair and moved assisted by a walker to stand before Judge Castro, who allowed relatives of the children, including the mother of Rosemary Vega and a sister of Paul Villareal, to give victim impact statements. Both women labelled Jones as "evil" and "cold-blooded", while Connie Weeks, mother of victim Joshua Sawyer, read a statement in court, wishing that Jones "live a long and miserable life behind bars". Jones, clad in a two-piece light blue prison jumpsuit, wearing broken glasses and a surgical mask, did not say anything during the proceedings, only interacting with her appointed public defender.

Castro subsequently sentenced Jones to life in prison with no parole for 20 years during an ordinary court session, delivering a short sentencing statement. She was given two years of credit that she served while awaiting trial, making her eligible for parole when she is 87 years old.

Something [has] to be said. You took God's most precious gift, babies. Defenseless, innocent (babies). Admitting (guilt) doesn't come close to what you did to these families and the tragedies that you caused. I'm going to follow this agreement here that you agreed (to) with your attorney and the state. But I truly believe that your ultimate judgment is in the next life.

— Judge Frank J. Castro

As of 2026, the Texas Department of Criminal Justice reports that Jones continues to serve her sentence at the Murray prison in Gatesville.

== Psychological profile and motives ==
In a work published by the College of Southern Idaho, author Michael Konrad says that Jones' case is particularly significant in forensic psychology. Konrad argues that Jones combines a complex factitious disorder imposed on another with traits of a narcissistic personality disorder, adding that medical oversight allowed her to evade capture for decades. He also compares Jones with other nonmedical serial killers like Dorothea Puente and Aileen Wuornos, who killed for financial gain and claiming self-defense, respectively, contrasting it to Jones's to "insatiable need for control and recognition". Konrad says that Jones took pleasure in the chaos of medical crises that she created for attention, exercising power over life and death, deceiving and manipulating colleagues, the system and putting up a murderous facade behind the trusted image of a nurse. Konrad concludes that Jones has a grandiose belief of self and a complete lack of empathy, never expressing genuine remorse for her actions, pointing to distinctive traits of malignant narcissism and antisocial personality disorder.

During Jones' first trial, District Attorney Ronald Sutton described a pattern in her actions, saying that all cases involved patients who were "youngsters with symptoms of potentially serious medical problems", and who were "too young to talk or [as in Jimmy Pearson's case] unable to". (Note: Pearson was 7 years old when he died after a series of seizures he suffered under the care of Genene Jones. His severe intellectual disability impeded him to communicate.)

In the 1998 book Deadly Medicine, authors Kelly Moore and Dan Reed argue that Jones enjoyed the thrill of inducing code blues, (medical emergencies) in patients to portray herself as a hero in the cases that she attempted to resuscitate.

In her 2011 letter to the state's board of paroles and pardons, Jones admitted that her actions were heinous, but assumed no moral responsibility, alleging that she was mentally ill at the time of her crimes. She had strongly denied being mentally ill on several prior occasions, including in a 1987 interview with author Peter Elkind, to whom she claimed she had never harmed anyone and that she had no psychological problems.

After her sentencing in January 2020, Andy Kahan, who serves as the director of the Houston-based Mayor's Crime Victims Office, applauded District Attorney Nico LaHood's job and chastised Jones, calling her a "psychopathical, egotistical, narcissistic nurse who tried to play God".

== In popular culture ==
Horror writer Stephen King reportedly based Annie Wilkes, the antagonist of his novel Misery, on Jones, with many fans finding similarities between Wilkes and Jones.

In a 1991 made-for-TV movie adaptation of the 1988 book Deadly Medicine, Jones is portrayed by actress Susan Ruttan, while Veronica Hamel and Scott Paulin portray Kathleen Holland and her husband, respectively.

In 2002, Jones is portrayed by Alicia Bartya in the straight-to-video movie "Mass Murder".

In 2008, she was featured in an episode of "Deadly Women" Season 2, Episode 4 entitled "Dark Secrets."

In 2016, she was featured in an episode of "Nurses Who Kill" Season 1, Episode 3 entitled "Genene Jones."

In 2020, she was featured in an episode of "Forensic Files" Season 5, Episode 10 entitled "Nursery Crimes."

In 2021, she was featured in an episode of "World's Most Evil Killers" Season 6, Episode 20 entitled "Genene Jones."

In 2024, she was featured in an episode of "Murder by Medic" Season 2, Episode 5 entitled "Genene Jones."

== Legal proceedings ==
=== Convictions ===
Table of charges
Count	Baby	Charge	Date of death/collapse	Mechanism	Date of conviction	Criminal penalty
1	Chelsea McClellan	Murder	September 17, 1982	Injection of succinylcholine	May 14, 1984	99 years in prison with triple credit. (Note: Under a 1977 provision in Texas law to address prison overcrowding in the state, Jones was benefited with an early release set for 2018.)
2	Rolando Santos	Attempted murder	December 1981 – January 1982 (Note: Jones attempted to kill Santos on three occasions during the boy's stay at PICU.)	Several injections of heparin	October 24, 1984	60 years in prison. (Note: As part of a plea deal at that time, the sentence was set to run concurrently with her 99-year prison term for murder.)
3	Joshua Sawyer	Murder	December 12, 1981	Injection of heparin	January 16, 2020 (pled guilty under a plea deal) (Note: The plea bargain included the dismissal of other four counts of murder and the possibility to avoid a trial by jury.)	Life in prison with a minimum of 20 years before parole eligibility.

=== Dismissed under guilty plea ===
Jones did not face trial for the other four counts of murder brought against her in 2017 under the terms of her plea deal, which dismissed four counts in exchange for a guilty plea on one of the five original counts. The charges are not acquitted.

Table of charges
Count	Baby	Intended charge	Date of death	Mechanism	Date of conviction	Criminal penalty
4	Richard "Rick" Nelson	Murder	July 3, 1981	Undetermined substance	—	—
5	Rosemary Vega	Murder	September 16, 1981	Undetermined substance	—	—
6	Paul Edward Villareal	Murder	September 24, 1981	Undetermined substance	—	—
7	Patrick Zavala	Murder	January 17, 1982	Undetermined substance	—	—

=== Suspected killings ===
Suspected deaths
Baby/Child	Date of death	Cause of death	Notes
Christopher James Hogeda	May 21, 1981	Cardiac arrest	Hogeda had several health problems and his death was not initially suspected as foul play.
Jose Antonio Flores	October 10, 1981	Bleeding	The boy abruptly decompensated during Jones' shift under symptoms compatible with heparin poisoning.
Doraelia Rios	December 22, 1981	Cardiac arrest	The girl was recovering from a successful gastrointestinal surgery when she suddenly decompensated and died on Jones' shift.
Jimmy Pearson	October 21, 1982	Complications from seizures	Pearson was a 7-year-old boy who suffered from severe intellectual disabilities and was unable to talk. He decompensated several times in August 1982, while under Jones' care. The boy ultimately succumbed to complications of these crises on October 21, 1982. District Attorney Sutton said that Pearson was injected with succinylcholine.
