= Hilltop Unit =

Prison in Gatesville, Texas, United States

- Location in Texas
- Location: 1500 State School Road Gatesville, Texas 76598-2996; 31.4753°N 97.7344°W
- Status: Operational
- Security class: G1-G3, Outside Trusty
- Capacity: Unit: 341 Trusty Camp: 212
- Opened: April 1981
- Managed by: TDCJ Correctional Institutions Division
- Warden: Andrea Lozada
- Website: Official website

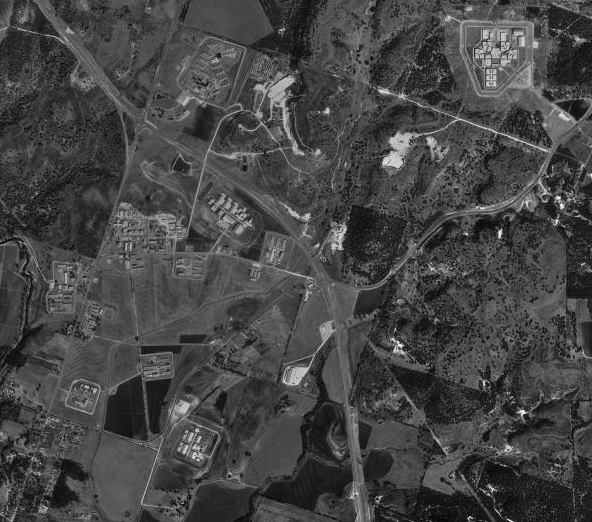
Aerial photograph of the prisons in Gatesville, January 13, 1996, United States Geological Survey

The Hilltop Unit is a Texas Department of Criminal Justice prison for women located in Gatesville, Texas. Originally opened in September of 1981 as a Male first offender Unit, it is headed by Warden Jerry Gunnels. Hackberry School was the first opened then in October Sycamore was opened and housed SAT IV Construction inmates who were working on Gatesville Unit and Hilltop repairing and buildings and facilities. Until May 1982, when the Hilltop Unit proper was opened.

It is located on Business Texas State Highway 36, 3 miles (4.8 km) north of Downtown Gatesville. Hilltop sits on an approximately 1,317-acre (533 ha) plot of land and is co-located with the Crain, Murray, and Woodman units. The Hilltop Unit uses buildings from the former Gatesville State School, making the Hilltop Unit's prison facility the third oldest facility still-used in Texas after the Huntsville Unit and the Jester I Unit.

== History ==
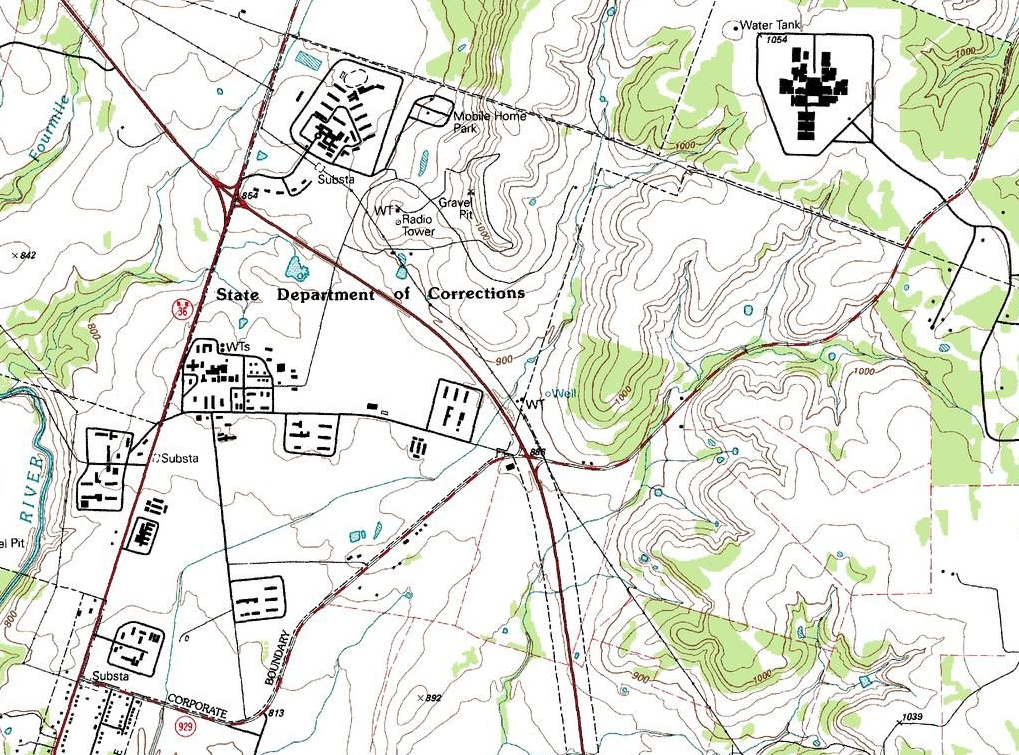
Topographical map of the Gatesville prison units (Hilltop, Christina Crain, Mountain View, and Hughes), U.S. Geological Survey, 1994

The Hilltop Unit was formed from the Hackberry and Hilltop units of the Gatesville State School, a juvenile detention facility that closed in 1979. The Live Oak, Riverside, Sycamore, Riverside, Terrace, and Valley schools of the Gatesville State School became the Gatesville Unit (now the Christina Crain Unit). The unit, which opened in April 1981, originally housed men. The unit was named "Hilltop" because the prison is in the highest point of the surrounding area.

== Facility ==
Hilltop is the hub of the six prisons in Gatesville. The Texas Department of Criminal Justice (TDCJ) described it as "a true prison farm" that "fittingly serves as the headquarters for the area’s agricultural operations." The unit has pigs fed on feeder slabs and sixty horses used by field officers from surrounding prison units. The regional operations and maintenance departments are located at Hilltop. The unit hosts the pre-service and in-service area training facilities. Hilltop is the center of vehicle maintenance and repair work, and it serves as the area fuel depot.

The exteriors of the Hilltop buildings have bright white paint; the TDCJ says that the buildings "sparkle like white diamonds when the light is right." Many building interiors have moldings dating from the 1890s. Some staircases are topped by pressed tin ceilings from era that the former Gatesville State School was built in. The Texas Building of Hilltop Unit was formerly Ferguson Hall; its current name stems from the concrete letters, colored in red, white, and blue, spelling "TEXAS." The Texas Building's first floor has classrooms and a library. The upstairs has an auditorium and a walled-in projection room. A cemetery containing graves of children of the former state school who died there is located across Business Highway 36.

Hilltop houses a program for female young offenders, located in the main Hilltop school. As of 2002 about 15 girls are in the program. The Hackberry Unit houses a Parole Modification and a Substance Abuse Felony Punishment Facility. Hackberry is no longer part of the Hilltop Unit.
