= Alfred D. Hughes Unit =

Prison in Texas

- Location in Texas
- Location: Gatesville, Texas, United States; 31.488056°N 97.704167°W
- Status: Operational
- Security class: G1-G5, Administrative Segregation, Safekeeping
- Capacity: 2,984
- Opened: January 1990
- Managed by: TDCJ Correctional Institutions Division
- Warden: Gene Miller
- Website: Official website

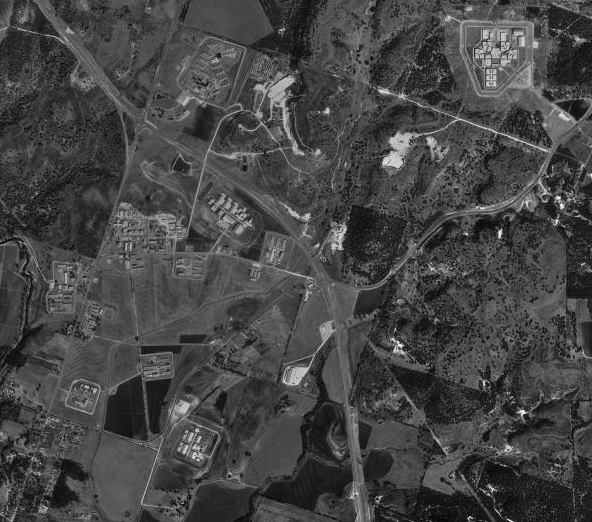
Aerial photograph of the prisons in Gatesville, January 13, 1996, United States Geological Survey

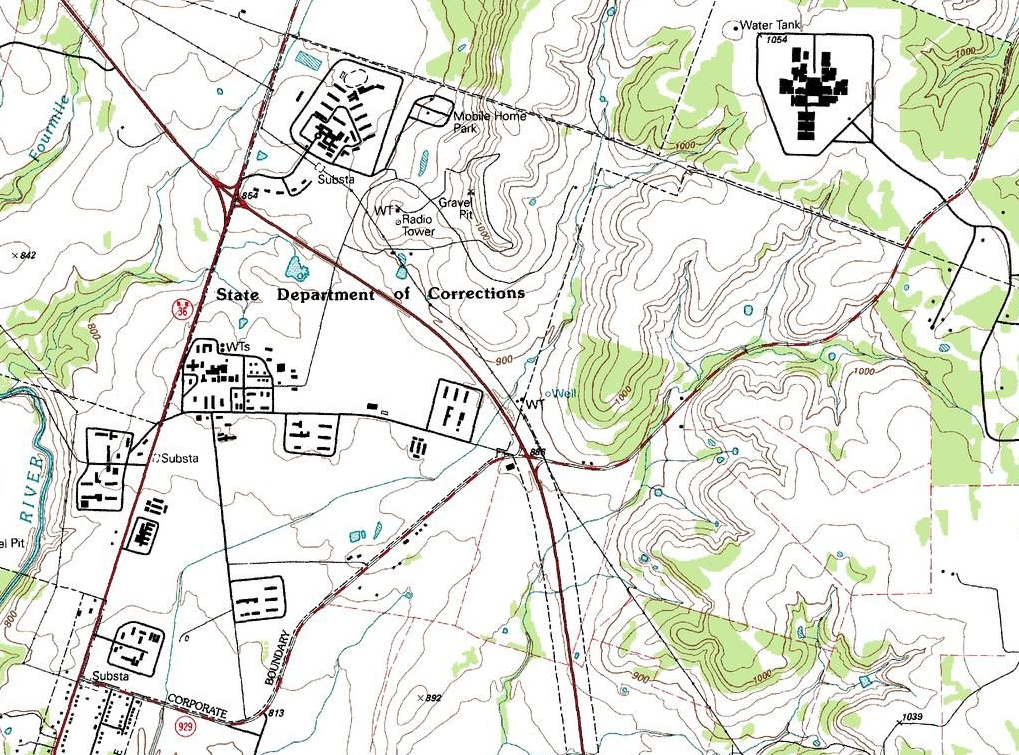
Topographical map of the Gatesville prison units (Hughes, Crain, Mountain View, and Hilltop), U.S. Geological Survey, 1994

Alfred D. Hughes Unit is a prison for men of the Texas Department of Criminal Justice located in Gatesville, Texas. The prison is named after Al Hughes who served as a chairperson on the Texas Board of Corrections from 1985 to 1989.

The 390 acres (160 ha) facility is located along Farm to Market Road 929, 1.5 miles (2.4 km) north of Texas Loop 36.

== Construction ==
In 1987 the Texas State Board of Corrections voted to build two new 2,250 inmate maximum security prisons in Amarillo and Gatesville and several medium security prisons. Charles Brown, who was the chairperson of the Texas Department of Corrections, said that the construction of each maximum security prison would cost $60 million. Al Hughes, who resigned as the Chairperson of the Texas Board of Corrections after the meeting that voted in favor of building the prisons, said that the Amarillo and Gatesville units could be built within 30 months. The Hughes Unit opened in January 1990.

== History ==
In 1991 a 27-year-old prisoner named Henry Rodriguez received multiple stab wounds in the Hughes recreation yard. He died in a hospital in Temple.

In 1995 the Texas Board of Criminal Justice approved installing new units for violent prisoners in several existing facilities, including Hughes.

In 2010 9% of Hughes's prisoners stated that they received sexual assaults from other prisoners; this self-reported rate is four times of the self-reported United States average.

In 2012 an inmate named Allen Wayne Brubaker (aka Allan Wayne Brubaker) was strangled to death at the Hughes Unit. An inmate named Joseph Chargualaf was indicted in 2013 for capital murder. Chargualaf was serving a 45-year sentence for murder at the time. .

== Notable prisoners ==
- Samuel Hadden Gifford, perpetrator of the murders of John Goosey and Stacy Barnett.
- Brian Salter, perpetrator of the murder of Caren Koslow.
- Scott Matthew Marshall, an SMU Law School graduate, drug addict and perpetrator of the murder of Staci Michelle Montgomery, the ex-wife of his law partner Bady Sassin.
- Adam Garibay, former border patrol agent convicted for the shooting death of his estranged wife's lover Keith Martin.
- Joesph Wayne Burnette, perpetrator of the murder of Dana Dodd.
- Alfredo Paez Jr.
