= Christine Paolilla =

American mass murderer (born 1986)

- Born: Christine Marie Paolilla; March 31, 1986 (age 40); Long Island, New York, U.S.
- Spouse: Justin Rott (m. 2005; div. 2009)
- Status: Incarcerated
- Motive: Robbery
- Conviction: Capital murder
- Penalty: Life imprisonment (minimum of 40 years)
- Accomplices: Christopher Snider (charged, died by suicide before apprehension)

Details
- Victims: Rachael Koloroutis; Tiffany Rowell; Marcus Precella; Adelbert Sanchez
- Date: July 18, 2003
- Country: United States
- State: Texas
- Location: Clear Lake City
- Weapons: 9mm semi-automatic pistol 38-caliber revolver
- Date apprehended: July 19, 2006
- Imprisoned at: Christina Melton Crain Unit

Christine Marie Paolilla (born March 31, 1986) is a convicted American mass murderer who is serving a life sentence for fatally shooting four people, including two of her friends, in their home in the Clear Lake City neighborhood of Houston, Texas, United States, on July 18, 2003. The killings, which came to be known as the Clear Lake Murders, made national headlines.

Paolilla, who was 17 years old at the time of the murders, was accompanied by her then-boyfriend, Christopher Snider. On July 19, 2006, three years and one day after the murders were committed, she was arrested. Paolilla was convicted in October 2008 and sentenced to life in prison. Snider, having been alerted that authorities had a warrant for his arrest, died by suicide at some point in July 2006.

== Early life ==
Paolilla was born on Long Island, New York to Lori, a stay-at-home mother, and Charles Paolilla, a construction worker. She has one older brother. When Paolilla was two years old, her father was killed in a construction accident. Following the death of her husband, Lori Paolilla began abusing drugs and eventually lost custody of her children to her parents. When Paolilla was in kindergarten, she was diagnosed with alopecia, which caused her to lose her hair, eyebrows, and eyelashes. As a result of the hair loss, Paolilla was forced to wear wigs. She also had poor vision and wore thick glasses. Paolilla was frequently ridiculed and bullied by her classmates for her appearance, which affected her self-confidence.

Paolilla was eventually reunited with her mother, who had overcome her drug addiction and remarried. The family then moved to Clear Lake City, Texas, a suburb of Houston. Paolilla enrolled at Clear Lake High School. She was befriended by two popular students, Rachael Koloroutis and Tiffany Rowell, who helped her improve her appearance and fit in with the other students. In 2003, at 17, Paolilla was voted "Miss Irresistible" by her school's student body. That year, she also began a relationship with 21-year-old Christopher Lee Snider. Paolilla's mother and stepfather disapproved of Snider, as did Koloroutis and Rowell, because of his frequent drug use and extensive criminal record. These fears would be substantiated, as Paolilla would increasingly use various drugs during the year she and Snider were in a relationship.

Lori Paolilla later recalled that Snider isolated her daughter from her friends and family and indicated that she had been raped and that the relationship was both abusive and dysfunctional. Snider's family also said the relationship was tumultuous and that Paolilla was prone to jealousy. After one particular fight with Snider, Paolilla spent the night on the front lawn of his family's home and threatened to kill his family.

== Murders ==
On July 18, 2003, Paolilla and Snider went to her friend Tiffany Rowell's home in Clear Lake City. Also at the home were Rachael Koloroutis; Rowell's boyfriend, Marcus Precella; and Precella's cousin, Adelbert Sanchez. According to Paolilla, she and Snider planned to steal the drugs that were kept at the house, but Snider reportedly got into an argument with Precella, which led to the shootings of Rowell, Koloroutis, Precella, and Sanchez. All four victims were shot multiple times, with a 9mm semi-automatic pistol and a 38-caliber revolver. Rachael Koloroutis attempted to crawl to a phone to call 911 after she was shot, but Paolilla struck her in the head multiple times with the butt of the revolver, bashing in her skull. Koloroutis and Rowell were both shot in the groin. Snider and Paolilla left little evidence at the crime scene, leading police to suspect that the killings were drug related, as Marcus Precella was said to have sold drugs from the home. Adelbert Sanchez had moved to Clear Lake to get away from violence on the north side to change his life around and he had only been in Clear Lake for about a week or two before losing his life. The only evidence police had were descriptions of the suspects, who were seen walking to and from the home by neighbors. An hour after the murders, Snider drove Paolilla to Walgreens, where she was scheduled to work the makeup counter.

== Apprehension ==
In 2004, Paolilla and Snider ended their relationship after Snider was jailed in Kentucky for car theft. Shortly thereafter, Paolilla entered rehab in Kerrville, Texas. It was there that she met Stanley Justin Rott, a heroin user with whom she began a relationship. The couple married in March 2005. Around that time, Paolilla came into a $360,000 trust fund left to her by her father. Paolilla used a portion of the money to buy a condominium. In July 2005, the second anniversary of the murders, Paolilla saw a newscast on television about the still unsolved case. She became upset after seeing sketches of the suspects given by neighbors and confessed to Rott that she and Snider had committed the murders. The couple then went into hiding. By November 2005, Paolilla and Rott were living in a motel room in San Antonio. For the next eight months, the couple holed up in the room, shooting heroin and cocaine.

On July 8, 2006, police received an anonymous tip via Crimestoppers regarding the murders of Rowell, Koloroutis, Precella, and Sanchez. The male caller told police that he had been in rehab with Paolilla who had admitted to being a participant in the crime (it was later reported that Justin Rott was not the man who called in the tip). Police tracked Paolilla down in San Antonio and arrested her on July 19. Paolilla's husband was also arrested as police found 70 vials of heroin in the couple's room. After their arrests, Rott told police that Paolilla had confessed to him that she had been an active participant in the murders. He stated that Paolilla had gone back into the house and beat Koloroutis to death with a gun, after finding her still clinging to life and attempting to summon help. Paolilla, who initially denied killing her friends, eventually admitted to participating in the murders but placed all the blame on her ex-boyfriend, Christopher Snider. On July 21, 2006, Paolilla and Snider, who had not yet been apprehended, were charged with capital murder. Paolilla's bail was set at $500,000 as she was considered a flight risk.

In June 2006, Snider had moved to Greenville, South Carolina, where he was living with a woman he met online. After Paolilla's arrest that July, one of Snider's family members called to inform him that police had issued a warrant for his arrest in relation to the murders. Acting on a tip that Snider may have died by suicide, police went to Greenville and searched near an area where Snider was reported to have been seen. His decomposing body was found in a heavily wooded area on August 5, 2006. It was later determined that Snider had overdosed on prescription pain medication.

== Conviction ==
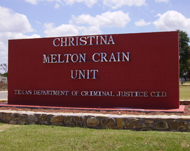
Christina Melton Crain Unit, where Paolilla is imprisoned as of 2023

On October 13, 2008, Paolilla was convicted of four counts of capital murder. As she had been a juvenile offender at the time of the killings, she was spared the death penalty. The following day, she was sentenced to life in prison.

Paolilla filed an appeal on November 29, 2008, on the grounds that "the trial court abused its discretion in setting [Paolilla's] amount of bail at $500,000". An appeals panel decided that the court did not abuse its discretion and affirmed Paolilla's original sentence. By 2011 she had filed additional appeals, which were also denied.

As of October 2025, (Note: incarcerated at Christina Melton Crain Unit since, at least, December 2015) Paolilla is incarcerated at the Christina Melton Crain Unit in Gatesville, Texas, and will be eligible for parole in July 2046, when she will be 60 years old.

== In popular culture ==
The case has been profiled on the documentary crime series 20/20, Snapped, Killer Kids, Forensic Files, Deadly Women, and Redrum.
