= Dr. Lane Murray Unit =

Prison in Texas, U.S.

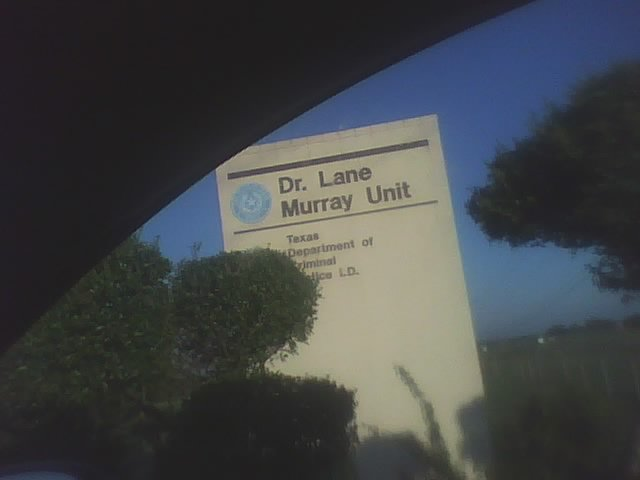

- Location in Texas
- Location: 1916 North Hwy 36 Bypass Gatesville, Texas 76596; 31°28′35″N 97°43′35″W
- Status: Operational
- Security class: G1-G4, Administrative Segregation
- Capacity: 1,341
- Opened: November 1995
- Managed by: TDCJ Correctional Institutions Division
- Warden: Audrey England
- Website: Dr. Lane Murray Unit

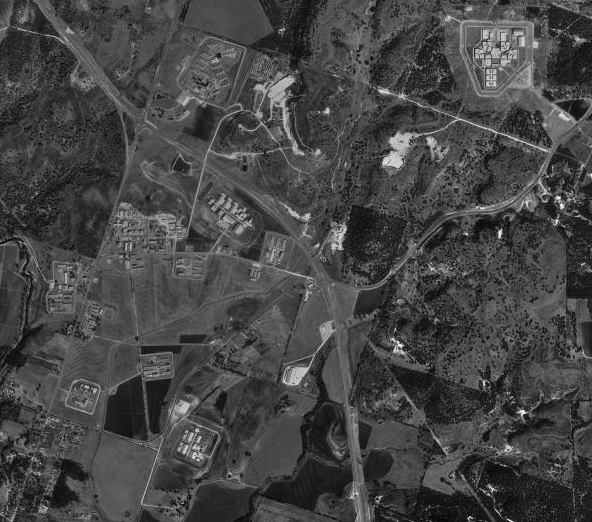
Aerial photograph of the prisons in Gatesville, January 13, 1996, United States Geological Survey

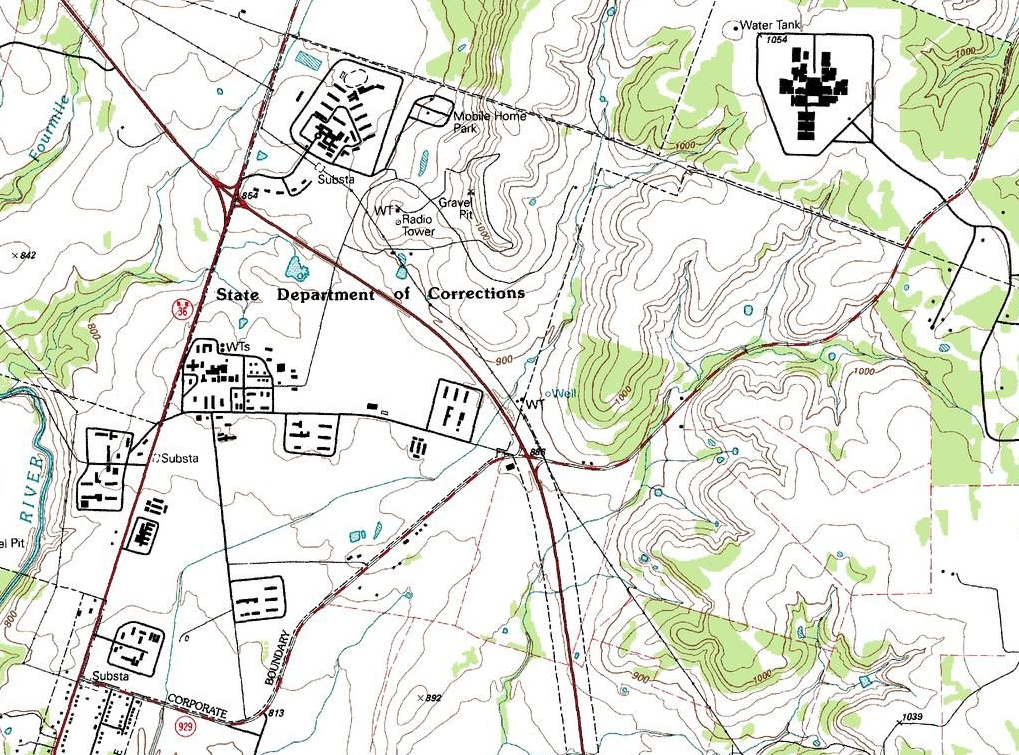
Topographical map of the Gatesville prison units, 1994, USGS - The area now contains the Murray Unit

Dr. Lane Murray Unit is a women's prison of the Texas Department of Criminal Justice located in Gatesville, Texas. The prison is located on Texas State Highway 36, between Farm to Market Road 215 and Farm to Market Road 929. The 1,317 acres (533 ha) unit, which opened in November 1995, is co-located with the Christina Crain Unit, the Hilltop Unit, the Patrick O'Daniel Unit, and the Linda Woodman State Jail. The unit is named after Lane Murray, who was the first superintendent of the Windham School District.

== History ==
In 1997, the State of Texas passed a law criminalizing any sexual relations between a prisoner and prison guard after prosecutors were unable to have a prison guard at Murray convicted for coercing inmates into sexual interactions. The prison guard stated that the sexual interactions were consensual.

In 2010 the Murray Unit began to host a faith-based dormitory rehabilitation program.

== Notable prisoners ==
=== Current ===
Inmate Name	Register Number	Status	Details
Kaitlin Armstrong	19482417 / 02475058	Serving a 90-year sentence; eligible for parole in 2052.	Perpetrator of the 2022 Murder of Moriah Wilson, a professional cyclist.
Elizabeth Denise Escalona	04827696 / 01814924	Serving a 99-year sentence; eligible for parole in 2042.	Elizabeth Escalona savagely beat her 2-year-old daughter Jocelyn Cedillo and super glued her hands to a wall, leaving her in a coma for several days. The child suffered bleeding in the brain, bite marks, and broken ribs. Elizabeth pled guilty to one count of felony injury to a child and was sentenced to 99 years in prison. She will be eligible for parole in 2042.
Chante Jawan Mallard	06849879 / 01183569	Serving a 50-year sentence. Eligible for parole in 2027.	Perpetrator of the 2001 Murder of Gregory Glenn Biggs in which Biggs struck the windshield of Mallard's car and then Mallard left Biggs to die while Biggs was still lodged in the glass pane.
Edith Beebe	06478363 / 01162441	Scheduled for release in 2078; eligible for parole in 2033.	Convicted of physically abusing multiple children.
Genene Jones	03193016 / 02302131	Serving a life sentence; eligible for parole in 2037.	Originally convicted in the 1980s of the murder of infant Chelsea McClellan when she was working as a licensed vocational nurse at the University Health System. The number of deaths Genene is responsible for is likely much higher, and in 2020, was convicted in the murder of infant Joshua Sawyer.
Diane Zamora	05713081 / 00814993	Serving a life sentence. Eligible for parole in 2036	Convicted, along with her boyfriend David Graham, in the 1995 murder of Adrianne Jessica Jones.
Stephanie Nadolny	04187780 / 02604853	Serving 180 Day Sentence, Scheduled for release on November 13, 2026	Property Theft & DWI Third or more. Professional Voice Actress

=== Former ===
- Kimberly Saenz- (Intake) Moved to Mountain View Unit.
- Karla Faye Tucker - American woman executed February 3, 1998, for killing two people with a pickaxe during a burglary. She was the first woman to be executed in the United States since Velma Barfield in 1984, and the first in Texas since Chipita Rodriguez in 1863.
