= City-County Airport =

City–County Airport may refer to:

Two airports formerly known as City–County Airport:

- Gatesville Municipal Airport (FAA: GOP) in Gatesville, Texas, United States
- Madras Municipal Airport (FAA: S33) in Madras, Oregon, United States

Other similarly named airports:

- Atwood–Rawlins County City–County Airport (FAA: ADT) in Atwood, Kansas, United States
- Comanche County–City Airport (FAA: MKN) in Comanche, Texas, United States
- Deer Lodge-City-County Airport (FAA: 38S) in Deer Lodge, Montana, United States
- Havre City–County Airport (FAA: HVR) in Havre, Montana, United States
- Henderson City-County Airport (FAA: EHR) in Henderson, Kentucky, United States
- Minneapolis City County Airport (FAA: 45K) in Minneapolis, Kansas, United States
- Modesto City–County Airport (FAA: MOD) in Modesto, California, United States
- Newton City/County Airport (FAA: EWK) in Newton, Kansas, United States
