= Gatesville Municipal Airport =

Gatesville Municipal Airport (formerly City-County Airport)
- IATA: none; ICAO: KGOP; FAA LID: GOP

Summary
- Airport type: Public
- Owner: City of Gatesville
- Location: Gatesville, Texas
- Elevation AMSL: 905 ft (276 m)
- Coordinates: 31°25′17″N 097°47′49″W

Map
- Location within Texas

Runways
Direction	Length		Surface
Direction	ft	m	Surface
17/35	3,400	1,036	Asphalt

Statistics (2003)
- Aircraft operations: 4,200
- Source: Federal Aviation Administration

Gatesville Municipal Airport (ICAO: KGOP, FAA LID: GOP) is a public airport located three miles (5 km) west of the central business district of Gatesville, a city in Coryell County, Texas, United States. This general aviation airport is owned by the City of Gatesville. It was formerly known as City-County Airport, at which time it was co-owned by Coryell County.

Although most U.S. airports use the same three-letter location identifier for the FAA and IATA, Gatesville Municipal Airport is assigned GOP (formerly 05F) by the FAA but has no designation from the IATA (which assigned GOP to Gorakhpur Airport in Gorakhpur, India).

== Facilities and aircraft ==
Gatesville Municipal Airport covers an area of 51 acres (21 ha) which contains one Asphalt paved runway, 17/35, measuring 3,400 x 60 ft (1,036 x 18 m).

For the 12-month period ending February 19, 2003, the airport had 4,200 aircraft operations, 100% of which were general aviation.

== See also ==
- List of airports in Texas
