= Murder of Dana Dodd =

American murder victim (1985–2006)

Dana Dodd
- Dodd in 2003
- Born: Dana Lynn Dodd; September 6, 1985
- Disappeared: c. 2003
- Status: Identified after 12 years
- Died: October 28, 2006 (aged 21)
- Body discovered: October 29, 2006; Kilgore, Texas, US
- Resting place: White Cemetery, Longview, Texas, US
- Known for: Formerly unidentified victim of homicide

Dana Lynn Dodd was a formerly unidentified American murder victim whose body was found in 2006 in Kilgore, Texas. In 2013, investigators had hoped that a new reconstruction of the victim might uncover more leads. In August 2018, Joseph Wayne Burnette was indicted for her murder, following a confession, stating her name may have been "Ashley." The victim's case was later submitted to the DNA Doe Project, who made an identification in January 2019, 12 years later. While she remained unidentified, she was known by the nickname "Lavender Doe".

== Discovery ==
The body of a white or possibly Hispanic female between 17 and 25 years old was found on October 29, 2006 in Kilgore, Texas, lying face-down on a pile of burning bush. The body was severely burned, but clothing, including a purple sweater and a pair of jeans was recovered. It is believed the body was set on fire merely minutes before it was discovered. A total of forty dollars was found in her pockets. It is believed she died between 8:15 PM and 10:00 PM on the previous day.

Two of her deciduous teeth were still present and were expected to help determine her identity. She had perfect teeth without cavities or fillings. She weighed approximately 100 to 120 pounds, was between 5 feet 3 inches and 5 feet 5 inches tall and was most likely from a middle-class household. The victim's hair color was likely reddish or blond with blond or red highlights, but may have been entirely strawberry-blonde or light brown.

Initially, she was believed to have been as young as 13, and race and sex were considered unknown until further study. Due to the recovery of an empty gasoline can from the scene and the nature of her death, the case was investigated as a homicide. Semen was found upon forensic examination, indicating that she may have been a victim of rape prior to death.

== Investigation ==
2014 NCMEC reconstruction

According to residents of the area, there were many "suspicious people" in the vicinity of the oil field where the body was discovered and some referred to the location as a "killing ground." Because of the condition of the body, the face was reconstructed three times—with clay, in a sketch by a forensic artist, and in January 2014, the National Center for Missing and Exploited Children released a digital composite image produced from a CT scan after the remains were exhumed on October 2, 2013.

Despite comparison with the dental records and DNA of a large number of missing persons, the search for her identity long remained fruitless. After the release of the most recent reconstruction, the mother of missing 23-year-old Brandi Wells, who disappeared after going out to a nightclub in Longview, Texas, in August 2006, contacted authorities, feeling the composite strongly resembled her daughter. DNA testing eliminated the possibility that the unidentified body could be Brandi Wells.

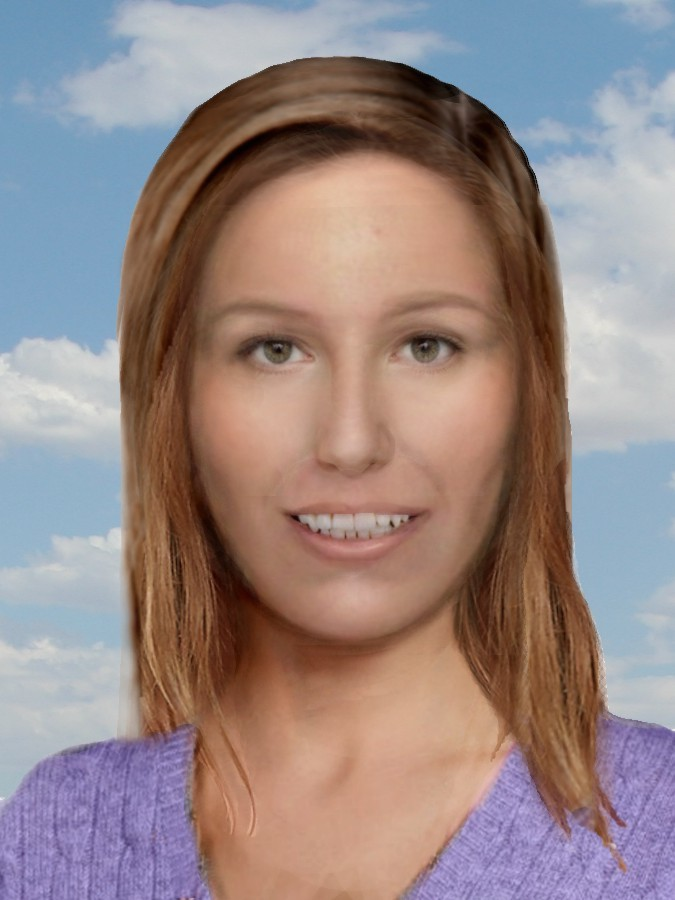
Additional reconstruction of Dodd by Carl Koppelman

In 2007, a suspect in the case emerged, Joseph Wayne Burnette, then 36, who was a convicted sex offender and was in prison for another crime at the time police announced their suspicions that he was the murderer. Burnette previously denied involvement in the murder; however, on August 27, 2018, he confessed to the killing of Lavender Doe, along with the 2018 murder of Felisha Pearson. Burnette claimed he convinced the victim to enter his vehicle when she was selling items from a magazine.

After Dodd's body remained unidentified, she was buried in Longview, Texas. In 2013, an exhumation took place in order to create the digital three-dimensional forensic facial reconstruction by the National Center for Missing and Exploited Children to provide an estimation of her appearance during life, as the state of her body upon discovery prevented visual identification. A three-dimensional clay reconstruction and a sketch had previously been created.

== Aftermath ==
In 2018, the DNA Doe Project took on the case to try to uncover Lavender Doe's identity. The organization raised $1,400 to analyze her DNA profile for genealogy research and estimate her ethnicity. They found Lavender Doe had Czech ancestry and identified a first cousin once removed who lived in East Texas 30 miles from where the body was found. In January 2019, the DNA Doe Project, in collaboration with the Aerodyne and Full Genomes Corporation team, announced they had identified Lavender Doe and that her identity would be released after Burnette's trial. Despite this, her identity was released on February 11, 2019. Her mother had left her when she was a baby and died in 2006; her father was homeless. She lived for a time with her stepmother and was last known to reside in Jacksonville, Florida, where she had lived with her half-siblings.

Dodd left her family in Florida in 2000, but was reportedly last seen in 2003. She had joined a door-to-door magazine sales team known for exploiting runaways under the ruse of travel opportunities. Authorities speculated that Dodd may have been selected by Burnette as a victim as she solicited customers in the parking lot of a Walmart in the area.

It was decided to leave Dodd's body where it was originally buried, as members of the police community spent years visiting and caring for the gravesite.

In December 2020, Burnette pleaded guilty to Dodd and Pearson's murders and was sentenced to 50 years for each murder.

== See also ==
- Lists of solved missing person cases
