= Linda Woodman State Jail =

Prison in Texas, United States

Linda Woodman Unit
- Location in Texas
- Location: Gatesville, Texas; 31°27′36″N 97°43′48″W
- Status: Operational
- Security class: J1, J2, J4, Segregation G1, G2, Transient
- Capacity: 900
- Opened: June 1997
- Managed by: TDCJ Correctional Institutions Division
- Warden: Patricia Walker
- Website: Official website

The Linda Woodman State Jail is a state jail operated by the Texas Department of Criminal Justice. The prison is named after Linda Woodman who served as warden of the Gatesville Unit and a survivor of the 1974 Huntsville Prison siege.

== History ==
The unit opened in June 1997 and serves as the processing center for females who have entered the TDCJ prison system from local county jails after conviction. The unit also serves screening and assessment for those with substance abuse.
