= Gatesville, Texas =

- City
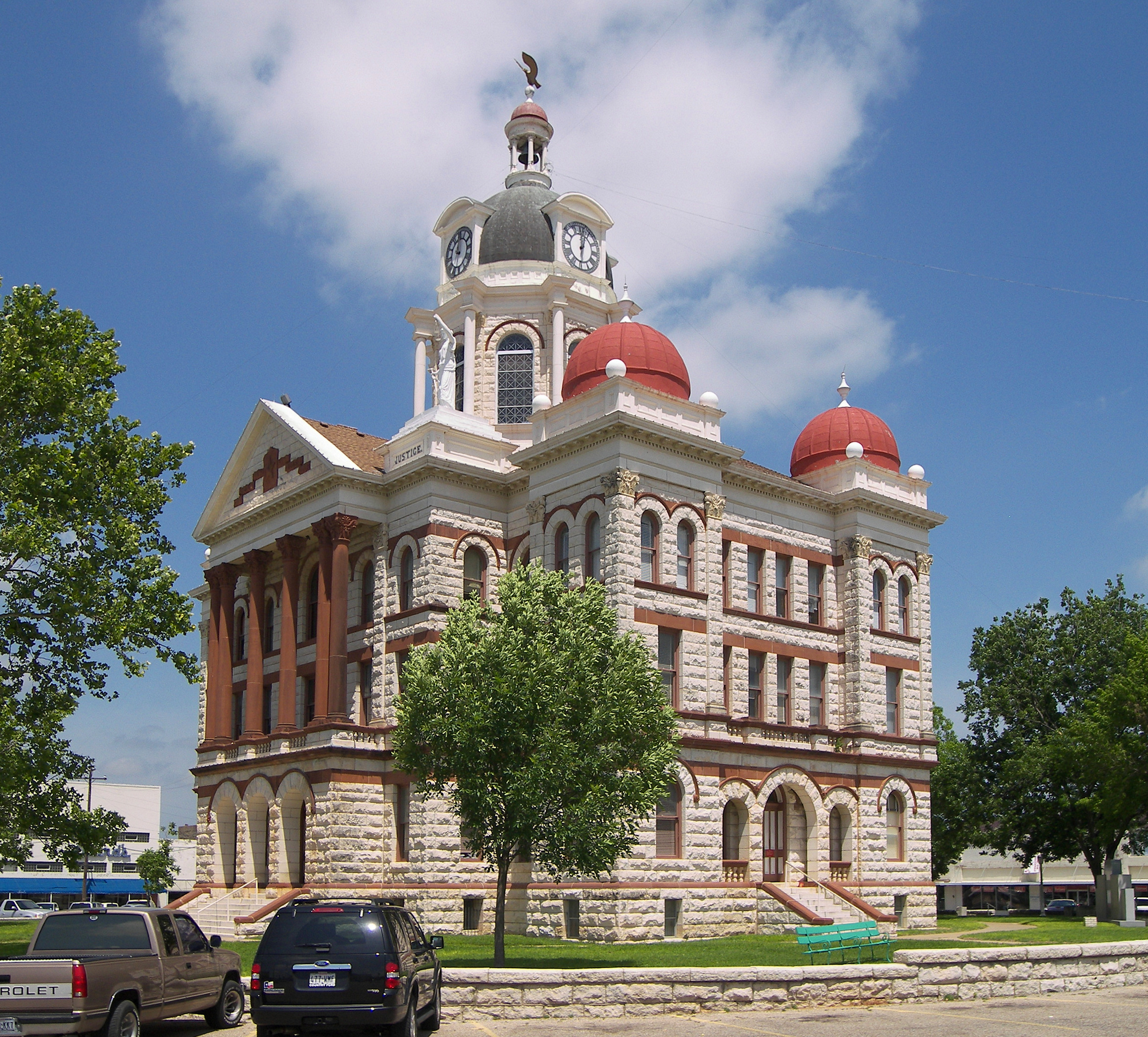
- Coryell County courthouse
- Nickname: Spur Capital of Texas
- Location of Gatesville, Texas
- Coordinates: 31°26′02″N 97°45′30″W
- Country: United States
- State: Texas
- County: Coryell

Government
  - Type: Council-Manager

Area
  - Total: 10.52 sq mi (27.24 km^{2})
  - Land: 10.50 sq mi (27.20 km^{2})
  - Water: 0.015 sq mi (0.04 km^{2})
- Elevation: 817 ft (249 m)

Population (2020)
  - Total: 16,135
  - Density: 1,180/sq mi (456/km^{2})
- Time zone: UTC–6 (CST)
  - Summer (DST): UTC-5 (CDT)
- ZIP codes: 76528
- Area code: 254
- FIPS code: 48-29168
- GNIS feature ID: 2410577
- Website: www.gatesvilletx.com

Gatesville is a city in and the county seat of Coryell County, Texas, United States. Its population was 16,135 at the 2020 census. The city has five of the ten prisons and state jails for women operated by the Texas Department of Criminal Justice. The Patrick O'Daniel Unit (formerly Mountain View Unit), has the state's death row for women.

Gatesville is part of the Killeen–Temple–Fort Hood metropolitan statistical area.

== Geography ==
The city is located northeast of the center of Coryell County on the east side of the Leon River, part of the Brazos River watershed.

The city is 30 miles (48 km) from Waco. It is midway between Austin and Fort Worth.

U.S. Route 84 runs through the city, leading east 37 miles (60 km) to Waco and west 50 miles (80 km) to Goldthwaite. Texas State Highway 36 passes through the eastern side of the city, leading northwest 32 miles (51 km) to Hamilton and southeast 35 miles (56 km) to Temple.

According to the United States Census Bureau, Gatesville has a total area of 10.52 sq mi (27.2 km^{2}), of which 0.015 sq mi (0.04 km^{2}), or 0.15%, is covered by water.

=== Climate ===
Gatesville has a humid subtropical climate (Köppen: Cfa) with long, hot summers and short, mild winters.

Climate data for Gatesville, Texas (1991–2020 normals, extremes 1900–present)
Month	Jan	Feb	Mar	Apr	May	Jun	Jul	Aug	Sep	Oct	Nov	Dec	Year
Record high °F (°C)	95 (35)	100 (38)	98 (37)	102 (39)	102 (39)	108 (42)	112 (44)	112 (44)	112 (44)	104 (40)	93 (34)	90 (32)	112 (44)
Mean maximum °F (°C)	79.0 (26.1)	82.0 (27.8)	86.9 (30.5)	90.5 (32.5)	94.4 (34.7)	98.4 (36.9)	102.4 (39.1)	103.0 (39.4)	99.6 (37.6)	92.5 (33.6)	84.9 (29.4)	79.0 (26.1)	104.5 (40.3)
Mean daily maximum °F (°C)	60.3 (15.7)	64.4 (18.0)	71.2 (21.8)	78.0 (25.6)	84.5 (29.2)	90.8 (32.7)	95.1 (35.1)	96.2 (35.7)	89.6 (32.0)	79.8 (26.6)	69.5 (20.8)	60.9 (16.1)	78.4 (25.8)
Daily mean °F (°C)	48.1 (8.9)	51.7 (10.9)	59.1 (15.1)	66.1 (18.9)	73.9 (23.3)	80.4 (26.9)	83.6 (28.7)	84.0 (28.9)	77.4 (25.2)	67.5 (19.7)	57.1 (13.9)	48.7 (9.3)	66.5 (19.2)
Mean daily minimum °F (°C)	35.8 (2.1)	39.0 (3.9)	47.0 (8.3)	54.2 (12.3)	63.3 (17.4)	70.0 (21.1)	72.1 (22.3)	71.7 (22.1)	65.2 (18.4)	55.2 (12.9)	44.6 (7.0)	36.5 (2.5)	54.6 (12.6)
Mean minimum °F (°C)	18.3 (−7.6)	22.1 (−5.5)	26.3 (−3.2)	34.9 (1.6)	44.9 (7.2)	59.6 (15.3)	66.1 (18.9)	63.4 (17.4)	49.7 (9.8)	35.7 (2.1)	25.2 (−3.8)	20.3 (−6.5)	15.3 (−9.3)
Record low °F (°C)	−6 (−21)	−8 (−22)	13 (−11)	27 (−3)	33 (1)	48 (9)	56 (13)	53 (12)	36 (2)	21 (−6)	13 (−11)	−4 (−20)	−8 (−22)
Average precipitation inches (mm)	2.32 (59)	2.54 (65)	3.22 (82)	3.19 (81)	4.14 (105)	3.39 (86)	2.97 (75)	2.97 (75)	2.94 (75)	4.18 (106)	2.63 (67)	2.53 (64)	37.02 (940)
Average snowfall inches (cm)	0.1 (0.25)	0.0 (0.0)	0.0 (0.0)	0.0 (0.0)	0.0 (0.0)	0.0 (0.0)	0.0 (0.0)	0.0 (0.0)	0.0 (0.0)	0.0 (0.0)	0.0 (0.0)	0.1 (0.25)	0.2 (0.51)
Average precipitation days (≥ 0.01 in)	4.6	4.6	5.6	5.1	7.0	4.7	3.3	4.3	4.3	4.3	4.6	5.1	57.5
Average snowy days (≥ 0.1 in)	0.1	0.0	0.0	0.0	0.0	0.0	0.0	0.0	0.0	0.0	0.0	0.1	0.2
Source: NOAA

== History ==
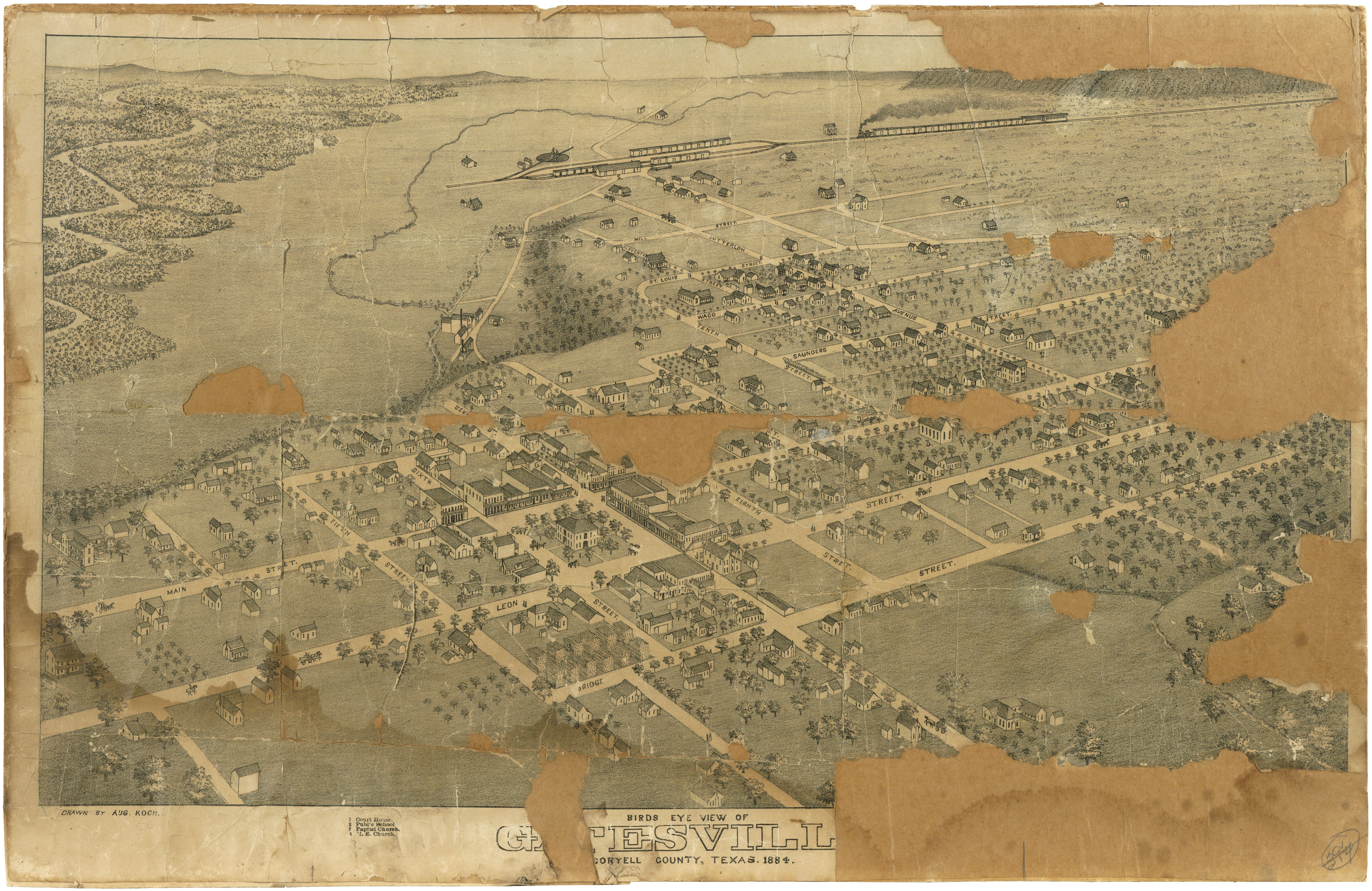
City in 1884

Gatesville was established in 1854 on land donated by Richard G. Grant. The name was taken from Fort Gates, which had been established in 1849 about 5 miles to the west.

Gatesville was the western terminus of the Texas and St. Louis Railway, with the town having been reached in 1882. This line later became the core of the St. Louis Southwestern Railway Company, commonly known as the Cotton Belt.

Over the course of the evening of March 16th and morning of March 17th, 2026, a fire destroyed several wooden buildings, built in the early 20th century, in downtown Gatesville. Among these buildings included the Gatesville Messenger and Star-Forum, the city's only newspaper for over 100 years, as well as a furniture store that has been in operation for even longer. Along with three minor injuries, the fire destroyed decades of undigitized archives held within the newspaper's building.

== Demographics ==
Historical population
Census	Pop.	Note	%±
1880	434		—
1890	1,375		216.8%
1900	1,865		35.6%
1910	1,929		3.4%
1920	2,499		29.5%
1930	2,601		4.1%
1940	3,177		22.1%
1950	3,856		21.4%
1960	4,626		20.0%
1970	4,683		1.2%
1980	6,078		29.8%
1990	11,492		89.1%
2000	15,591		35.7%
2010	15,751		1.0%
2020	16,135		2.4%
U.S. Decennial Census

=== 2020 census ===
As of the 2020 census, Gatesville had a population of 16,135 people, 3,330 households, and 1,151 families. The median age was 38.6 years, 13.7% of residents were under 18, and 9.7% were 65 or older. There were 76.8 males for every 100 females, and 73.1 males for every 100 females 18 and over.

About 92.1% of residents lived in urban areas, while 7.9% lived in rural areas.

Of the 3,330 households in Gatesville, 35.2% had children under 18 living in them, 44.0% were married-couple households, 17.4% were households with a male householder and no spouse or partner present, and 32.3% were households with a female householder and no spouse or partner present. About 30.4% of all households were made up of individuals, and 13.6% had someone living alone who was 65 or older.

The city had 3,783 housing units, of which 12.0% were vacant. The homeowner vacancy rate was 2.5% and the rental vacancy rate was 11.3%.

Racial composition as of the 2020 census
Race	Number	Percent
White	9,894	61.3%
Black or African American	2,605	16.1%
American Indian and Alaska Native	93	0.6%
Asian	105	0.7%
Native Hawaiian and other Pacific Islander	15	0.1%
Some other race	2,477	15.4%
Two or more races	946	5.9%
Hispanic or Latino (of any race)	3,604	22.3%

=== 2000 census ===
As of the census of 2000, 15,591 people, 2,640 households, and 1,752 families resided in the city. The population density was 1,794 inhabitants per square mile (693/km^{2}). The 2,963 housing units had an average density of 341 per square mile (132/km^{2}). The racial makeup of the city was 63.20% White, 27.00% African American, 0.34% Native American, 0.35% Asian, 0.05% Pacific Islander, 8.49% from other races, and 0.56% from two or more races. Hispanics or Latinos of any race were 14.73% of the population.

Of the 2,640 households, 32.5% had children under 18 living with them, 49.2% were married couples living together, 13.3% had a female householder with no husband present, and 33.6% were not families. About 29.9% of all households were made up of individuals, and 15.2% had someone living alone who was 65 or older. The average household size was 2.46, and the average family size was 3.04.

In the city, the age distribution was 11.7% under 18, 10.3% from 18 to 24, 53.9% from 25 to 44, 16.3% from 45 to 64, and 7.7% who were 65 or older. The median age was 35 years. For every 100 females, there were 63.8 males. For every 100 females age 18 and over, there were 59.6 males.

The median income in the city for a household was $29,534 and for a family was $36,543. Males had a median income of $30,625 versus $17,073 for females. The per capita income for the city was $11,152. About 12.4% of families and 14.3% of the population were below the poverty line, including 17.7% of those under 18 and 14.9% of those 65 or over.

The population doubled from 1980 to 2010 with to the establishment of the Texas Department of Criminal Justice prisons. As of 2000, about 9,000 of the 15,591 residents were state prisoners.

== Economy ==
Two manufacturing companies are located in Gatesville:

- Kalyn Siebert is a company that makes heavy-haul trailers and equipment for construction, oilfield and energy, national defense, and other specialized transportation requirements.
- Laerdal Medical Corporation, a division of Laerdal based in Norway, is a manufacturer of plastic medical teaching supplies. The division, formerly known as Medical Plastics Laboratories, Inc., was founded in 1949 by three Gatesville doctors. In January 2000, it was sold to Laerdal.

== Prisons ==
Gatesville is the home of several prisons operated by the Texas Department of Criminal Justice, including the Patrick O'Daniel Unit, which houses the women's death row. Gatesville is located on the northern edge of Fort Hood, and as such is also dependent on the military for a part of its economy (besides Fort Hood, a large military vehicle repair facility is located on the east side of town).

As of 2012, the prisons in the Gatesville area employ 2,600 people. Most of the employees live in Coryell County. Timothy F. Orwig (born 1949) of the Cove Herald said, "Correctional officers in gray uniforms have been a common sight in the town's businesses for years, and the job of a 'prison boss' was once a highly regarded career choice in Gatesville."

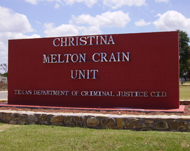
Christina Melton Crain Unit, a women's prison of the Texas Department of Criminal Justice

Of the eight Texas Department of Criminal Justice general correctional facilities for women, which include five prisons and three state jails, four prisons and one state jail are in within the city limits.

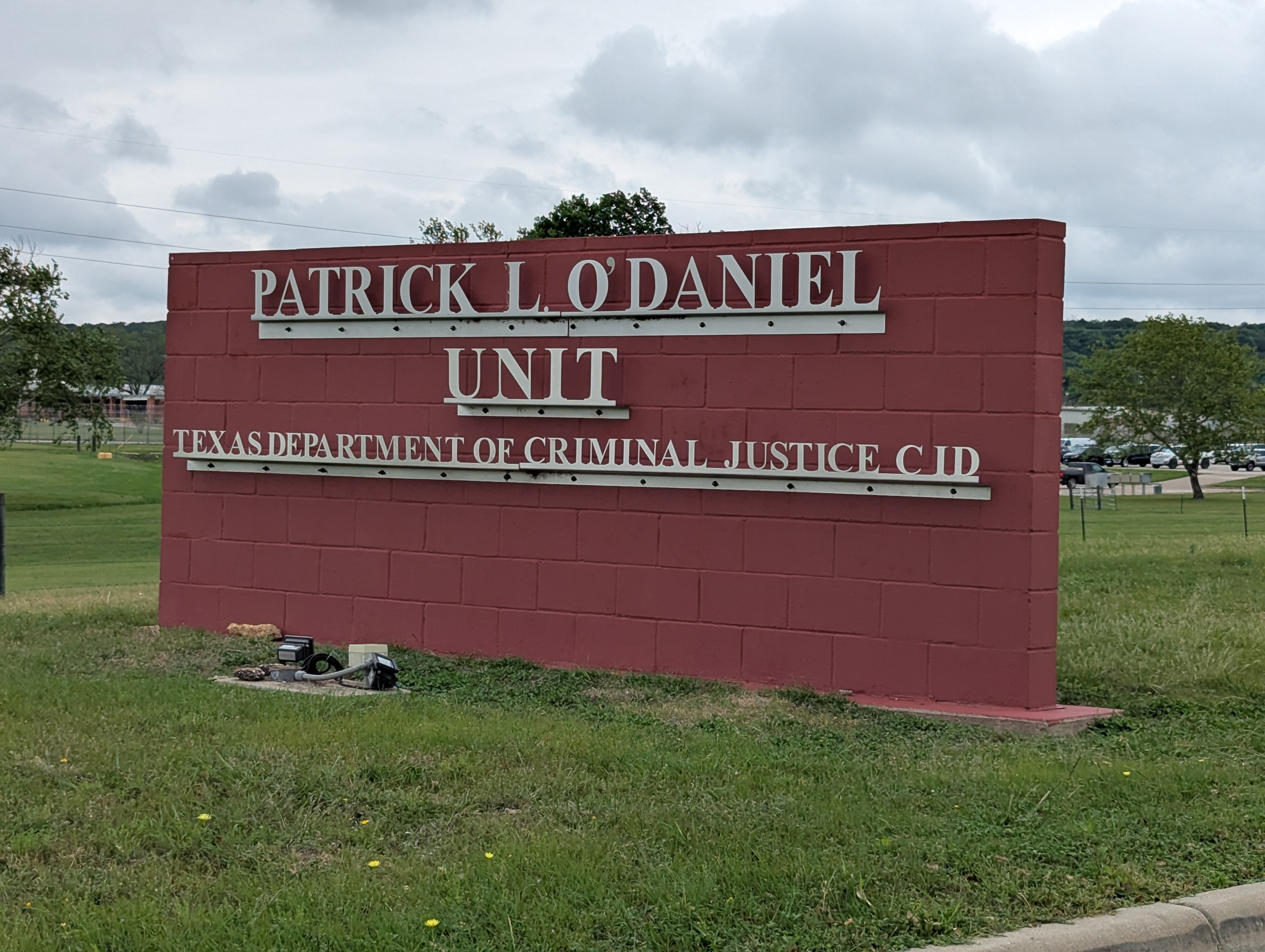
Patrick L. O'Daniel Unit, which houses the state death row for women

The Christina Melton Crain Unit prison (formerly Gatesville Unit), the Hilltop Unit prison, the Dr. Lane Murray Unit prison, and the Linda Woodman Unit state jail are co-located among one another. In addition the Patrick O'Daniel Unit, a prison with the State of Texas female death row, is in Gatesville. One prison for males, the Alfred D. Hughes Unit, is in Gatesville. As of 2012, the 5,552 female prisoners and 2,958 male prisoners were over half of the population of the city.

Patrick O'Daniel Unit (then Mountain View Unit) opened in July 1975, Crain opened in August 1980, Hilltop opened in November 1981, and Hughes opened in January 1990. The Murray Unit opened in November 1995, and the Woodman Unit opened in June 1997.

Gatesville previously hosted the Gatesville State School and the Mountain View State School, juvenile correctional centers of the Texas Youth Commission. The Mountain View State School closed in 1975, and the Gatesville State School closed in 1979. The buildings were transferred to the Texas Department of Corrections and were used as prisons for adults.

== Post office ==
The United States Postal Service operates the Gatesville Post Office.

== Public education and educational resources ==
The Gatesville Independent School District is the area school district.

Gatesville has a public library.

All of the county is in the service area of Central Texas College.

== Parks and recreation ==
Since 2000, the Prison Boss Cookoff, a barbecue competition that serves as a fundraiser for the Correctional Peace Officers Foundation, has been held every year. Orwig described it as "a family gathering of prison workers."

== Other highlights ==
Donated in 1991, the Coryell County Museum in Gatesville is home to the Loyd and Madge Mitchell Collection of about 10,000 pairs of spurs, thought to be the largest such collection in the world. In 2001, the 77th Texas Legislature designated Gatesville the "Spur Capital of Texas".

As of 2014, the Last Drive-In Picture Show in Gatesville, opened by Gene Palmer in 1955 — and, as of 2004, owned by his son, Audie Gene Palmer (1957–2004) — was one of 17 remaining drive-in theaters in Texas; of those 17, it is one of oldest and longest continuously running.

The Gatesville High School Hornets were the 2000 Texas UIL 4A high-school football champions.

== Notable people ==
- William Blankenship (born 1928), opera tenor
- Bart Bryant (born 1962), professional golfer
- Cotton Davidson (1931–2022), former AFL and NFL quarterback
- Dan Edwards (1926–2001), professional football player
- Mary Beth Harrell (born 1956), regional TV talk-show host and former prosecutor for the City of Temple
- Taurean Henderson (born 1983), former NFL football player
- David Holt (born 1946), musician
- Jim Miller (1866–1909), outlaw who lived on the Plum Ranch, outside of Gatesville
- Frank S. Page, pastor
- J. D. Sheffield (born 1960), physician and state legislator
- Benny Thomasson (1909–1984), Texas fiddler
- Bulldog Turner (1919–1998), NFL football player
- Mike Weaver (born 1951), former WBA boxer

== See also ==
- Flat, Texas
- Gatesville Municipal Airport
- KYAR
- List of city nicknames in Texas
- My Ghost Story TV series location
- National Register of Historic Places listings in Coryell County, Texas
- Roman Catholic Diocese of Austin, Waco Deanery
- Scott & White Memorial Hospital
- Stephenville North and South Texas Railway
- Texas locations by per capita income
- Texas State Guard, Army, 2nd Regiment, Gatesville
- Troop 1500, 2005 documentary film
- W.C. Dodson (1829–1914), architect of the Coryell County Courthouse in Gatesville
- 71st Battlefield Surveillance Brigade
