= Jeffery Lee Wood =

American convicted murderer on death row

- Born: August 19, 1973 (age 53)
- Known for: Tried under the Texas law of parties
- Status: On death row
- Conviction: Capital murder
- Penalty: Death (March 2, 1998)

Details
- State: Texas
- Date apprehended: January 2, 1996

Jeffery Lee "Jeff" Wood (born August 19, 1973) is a man on death row in the state of Texas. He was scheduled for execution in 2008 and 2016 before stays of execution were issued. As in the case of Kenneth Foster, Wood's death sentence stems from the Texas law of parties, which is related to the felony murder rule.

== Personal life ==
=== Early life ===
Wood grew up in San Antonio, Texas. During his childhood and adolescence, he was subjected to severe physical and emotional abuse by his father.

From an early age, Wood was identified with a learning disorder and attention deficit hyperactivity disorder. Furthermore, he was diagnosed with severe overanxious disorder with avoidant features due to his problematic behaviors and inferiority complex. It was determined that Wood met the disability criteria for emotional disturbance, and he was placed in special education thereafter.

In 1994, Wood fathered a daughter with his then-girlfriend.

=== Mental health ===
Wood has a long history of mental health issues. In addition to ADHD and overanxious disorder, he has also received diagnoses of delusional disorder, paranoid personality disorder, antisocial personality disorder, conduct disorder, and dysthymic disorder. Furthermore, he has been diagnosed with borderline intellectual functioning due to his subaverage IQ and treated for suicidal ideation and multiple suicide attempts during his incarceration.

== Crime ==
=== Murder of Kriss Keeran ===
Wood and Daniel Earl "Danny" Reneau were frequent customers at their local Texaco convenience store in Kerrville, Texas, where they had befriended the assistant manager, William "Bill" Bunker, and clerk Kriss Lee Keeran. The four of them had discussed staging a robbery after the holiday period to split the proceeds four ways. Bunker had given Reneau and Wood inside information about the store’s safe and surveillance recording equipment and instructions on how to enter the office from the back door. According to a police report, Bunker could have prevented the death of Keeran, yet he was never charged as a party to the crime despite his role in the conspiracy to defraud the store.

In the early hours of January 2, 1996, Reneau and Wood drove to the Texaco station. When they learned that Keeran had backed out and locked the back door, they abandoned the plan and returned home. Later that morning, Reneau and Wood set off for Devine, Texas, to return Wood’s brother’s truck. Before leaving Kerrville, they stopped at the Texaco station, where Wood stayed in the truck. As Reneau entered the store, he pointed a gun at Keeran and told him to go to the back office. When Keeran didn’t cooperate, Reneau fatally shot him in the face. Upon hearing the shot, Wood got out of the truck and entered the store, where Reneau ordered him at gunpoint to assist him. The safe and cash box contained approximately $11,350 in cash and checks (equivalent to $23,300 in 2025).

=== Daniel Reneau ===
Wood met co-defendant, Daniel Earl "Danny" Reneau, in 1995. Reneau had up until that point spent most of his life in psychiatric hospitals and would later be diagnosed with severe personality disorder. Wood had not been engaged in criminal activity before meeting Reneau. At Reneau's trial, the State recognized that his presence was the impetus for Wood's involvement, and two State witnesses who had participated in burglaries with Reneau both testified that they too had been threatened at gunpoint by him.

Reneau admitted to being the shooter in the murder of Kriss Keeran and was executed in 2002.

== Criminal case ==
=== Arrest ===
Wood and Reneau were both arrested on the same day of the murder. Wood led police to the murder weapon, which Reneau had thrown from the truck in Val Verde County. Wood was interrogated by police without counsel present. He gave two statements, which he later revoked, claiming they were involuntary due to being intoxicated and sleep-deprived at the time of questioning. Both uncounseled statements were played for the jury during the guilt/innocence phase of his trial.

=== Pretrial and mental incompetency ===
At Wood’s pretrial, the court heard that he had no prior felonies and no history of violent crime prior to associating with Reneau. Following a competency hearing, the jury found Wood incompetent to stand trial based on the testimony of his counsel and a neuropsychologist, who stated that his delusional and paranoid thought processes affected his ability to grasp the risks of conviction and rationally aid in his defense.

Wood was committed to the Texas Department of Mental Health and Mental Retardation at Vernon State Hospital, where he was assessed on factors unrelated to the issues raised at his competency hearing and thus received no treatment. He was discharged a couple of weeks after being admitted and was found competent at a second competency hearing, despite a neuropsychologist's testimony that Wood’s irrationality and inability to communicate effectively with his counsel had remained unchanged.

=== Trial and conviction ===
At Wood’s trial, his counsel sought to present one expert witness and two supporting witnesses, which the State objected to on relevance and hearsay grounds, despite having previously found the same witness’s testimony to be credible at Reneau’s trial. The court sustained the objections, and thus no defense was presented to the jury, and Wood was subsequently found guilty of capital murder.

Following the guilty verdict, Wood suffered a mental breakdown and requested to discharge his counsel and represent himself, which was denied by the court on mental competency grounds. Wood then directed his counsel not to act on his behalf during the remainder of the trial, which resulted in the absence of cross-examination of the State’s witnesses, oral arguments, and mitigating evidence. Wood’s counsel stated on record that they considered his directives a gesture of suicide but did not request a mid-trial competency determination.

The State took inconsistent positions in Wood’s and Reneau’s respective trials as to who plotted and led the crime. It also presented the expert testimony of discredited psychiatrist Dr. James Grigson, also known as "Dr. Death". Based on a hypothetical question and without having evaluated Wood, he testified that Wood posed a future threat to society. Unbeknownst to the jury, Grigson had been expelled from the American Psychiatric Association and the Texas Society of Psychiatric Physicians three years prior for ethical violations in his court testimonies.

Wood was sentenced to death for capital murder under the Texas law of parties on March 2, 1998.

== Post-conviction ==
=== Scheduled executions ===
Wood was scheduled for execution on August 21, 2008. Chief United States District Judge Orlando Luis Garcia granted Wood a last-minute stay and appointed counsel and a mental health expert to assist Wood in his claim of incompetency on the grounds of his delusional thought processes. Wood's request for assistance had previously been denied by the state trial court. After an evidentiary hearing, Garcia concluded that the evidence presented was insufficient to support Wood’s claim of incompetence, and thus his stay of execution was lifted.

Wood's second execution date was set for August 24, 2016. He was granted a stay by the Texas Court of Criminal Appeals five days before his scheduled execution due to his claims of violation of due process based on the State's use of false testimony and false scientific evidence from Dr. James Grigson. After reviewing Wood's claims, the state trial court recommended that execution relief be granted. However, the Texas Court of Criminal Appeals disregarded the recommendation and upheld Wood's death sentence.

=== Appeals and clemency petitions ===
Wood has filed multiple appeals and habeas applications, all of which have been denied. Wood’s clemency petitions have been supported by thousands of members of the public, media outlets, religious leaders, and Texas legislators.

In 2008, Keeran’s father asked Governor Rick Perry to commute Wood’s sentence and stated that he would prefer Wood to spend the rest of his life in prison. In 2017, Kerr County District Attorney Lucy Wilke, who was the prosecutor in Wood’s case, requested the Texas Board of Pardons and Paroles to recommend that Governor Greg Abbott grant clemency to Wood and commute his sentence to life imprisonment. The Texas Board of Pardons and Paroles refused to consider Wilke’s request as there was no execution warrant pending at the time. Moreover, three jurors from Wood’s trial have submitted affidavits stating that they no longer think Wood is deserving of the death penalty.

=== Media ===
Wood's case was covered on The First Degree Podcast in March 2023.

=== Current status ===
As of 2026, Wood remains on death row with no scheduled execution date.

== See also ==
- Capital punishment in Texas
- Capital punishment in the United States
- List of death row inmates in the United States
