= Trial and conviction of Charles Flores =

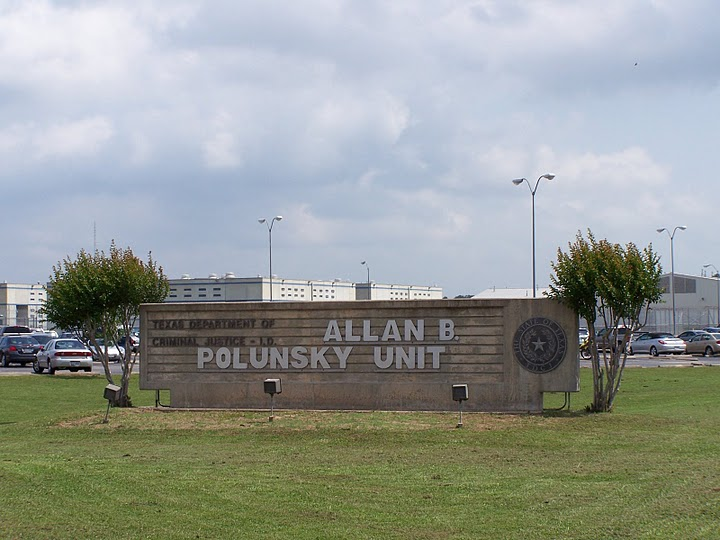
Allan B. Polunsky Unit where Charles Don Flores sits on death row Charles Don Flores in the visitation room at Polunsky Unit in Livingston, Texas

Charles Don Flores was convicted of the 1998 murder of 64-year-old Elizabeth "Betty" Black in Farmers Branch, Texas, United States. Flores didn't shoot Black, but received the death sentence under Texas law for being an accomplice despite not matching the description of the accomplice.

Flores' conviction relied on testimony from Black's neighbor, Jill Barganier, whose account changed after undergoing forensic hypnosis. Testimony obtained by hypnosis was banned in the state of Texas in 2023, however the law did not apply retroactively. Barganier had been unable to identify Flores in a photo lineup before her hypnosis.

In 2000, Richard Lynn Childs confessed to murdering Black and was sentenced to 35 years in prison; he was released on parole in 2016. Flores was never accused of pulling the trigger, but was convicted under the law of parties.

No physical or DNA evidence has tied Flores to the murder, and he has maintained his innocence since his arrest. He currently awaits execution at the Polunsky Unit in Livingston, Texas. Numerous experts and advocacy groups, including the Innocence Project, American Psychological Association and Penn & Teller, are advocating on his behalf.

== Murder ==
On January 29, 1998, William Black returned home to find his home torn apart and his wife, Elizabeth "Betty" Black, murdered. It would later be revealed that Black had been killed in a robbery gone wrong, as the Blacks had been hiding drug money for their son while he was in prison.

== Investigation ==
Soon after the murder, multiple neighbors stated to police that they saw two men get out of a Volkswagen Beetle with a psychedelic paint scheme and go into the Black's home. Within a day, the Black's next-door neighbor easily identified Richard Childs as the car's driver.

At first, none of the witnesses were able to identify the passenger who went into Black's home along with Childs. Five days after the murder, one of the witnesses — Jill Barganier — was brought to the police station in hopes of creating a composite sketch of the passenger. Barganier positively identified Childs as the driver, but was unable to identify the passenger from two photo lineups she was shown, both of which included Flores.

She was hypnotized by a police officer who was trained in forensic hypnosis, but had never performed hypnosis before, in hopes of helping her make an identification. Under hypnosis, she stated that the passenger was a white male, medium build, with "very long" hair. Before the end of the hypnosis session, the officer told her that she would “be able to recall more of the events as time goes on”. The recording of the hypnosis session revealed that not all rules were followed; for example, when the technique was still allowed, Texas law did not allow any officer involved in the investigation to be part of the hypnosis session.

Flores maintains that he was making breakfast with his common-law wife, Myra Wait, in Irving, Texas, at the time of the murder.

== Trial ==
Barganier only identified Flores as the passenger of the VW Beetle over a year later in the courtroom during Flores's trial. Flores' counsel has pointed out that his mug shot was shown frequently on television and in the newspaper, and Barganier acknowledged seeing his photograph before identifying Flores in the courtroom.

Barganier's identification of Flores in court also did not match her original description of the passenger as a tall white man with long hair; Flores is "Hispanic, short, stocky with then shaved hair." Flores' defense team requested a Zani hearing — a judicial review of the hypnosis session to determine whether subsequent testimony could be admitted at trial — and while the judge found at least three of ten guidelines had not been followed, the judge nonetheless allowed Barganier to testify trial.

Flores was never accused of murdering Black, only of being a party to the crime. No fingerprints, DNA, or other physical evidence were presented at trial that tied Flores to the crime or to the scene of the crime.

Flores' defense team called only one witness during the guilt phase of his trial, a firearms expert who testified that a gun recovered by police and belonging to Flores was not the murder weapon. He was found guilty of capital murder on March 30, 1999 under the Texas Law of Parties. During his sentencing, his defense attorneys had intended to call his parents, Lily and Caterino Flores, and his common-law wife, Myra Wait, as mitigating witnesses. However, at the time, Flores's parents were under indictment for allegedly hindering his apprehension, while Wait was the subject of a pending grand jury investigation. Consequently, none of the three testified on his behalf during sentencing. Flores's attorneys contend that prosecutorial actions involving his family interfered with the presentation of mitigating evidence.

=== Richard Childs ===
After confessing to her murder, Richard Childs — whose father was a police officer — signed a guilty plea for the murder of Elizabeth Black on April 5, 2000. When he was arrested, Childs had "a box of cartridges that were the same caliber as the bullets from the crime scene." Childs was also known to own a Volkswagen Beetle with a psychedelic paint scheme that matched witness accounts from the morning of Black's murder.

Childs was sentenced to 35 years in prison; he was released on parole in 2016 after serving 17 years of his sentence.

=== Prosecution witnesses and later disclosures ===
In a June 2025 habeas corpus application, Flores's legal team presented an affidavit from Bradley K. Lollar, his trial attorney, raising concerns about the disclosure of evidence and the credibility of several prosecution witnesses.

Lollar stated that the defense had not been informed of alleged arrangements or benefits involving multiple witnesses. According to the affidavit, Homero Garcia and Judy Haney received favorable treatment in criminal proceedings in connection with their testimony. Lollar also described previously undisclosed interactions between prosecutor Jason January and prosecution witness Jackie Roberts, including alleged pressure related to her probation.

The application argued that the alleged nondisclosure of these matters deprived the defense of potentially significant evidence with which to challenge witness credibility. Lollar also stated that the defense had not been aware of negotiations concerning Richard Childs's eventual plea agreement.

=== Appellate review of circumstantial evidence ===
In reviewing Flores's post-convicting proceedings, the Texas Court of Criminal Appeals and the United States Court of Appeals for the Fifth Circuit summarized the prosecution's circumstantial evidence and denied a certificate of appealability in July 2015 concerning proposed ineffective-assistance-of-counsel claims. The ruling did not constitute a new trial or an independent determination of Flores's guilt based on the evidence presented in his later post-conviction applications.

According to the Fifth Circuit's summary of the trial record, prosecutors presented evidence that:

- Flores admitted he was with co-defendant Richard Childs at Flores's home using narcotics until approximately 3:00 a.m. on the morning of the murder, and witnesses testified the two left together in Childs's multi-colored Volkswagen Beetle.
- Two days after the murder, Flores towed Childs's Volkswagen Beetle to the side of a highway and set it on fire.
- Flores subsequently fled to Mexico, and upon returning to Texas, led police on a high-speed chase, crashed, and later attempted to escape custody from Parkland Memorial Hospital by grabbing a deputy's firearm and spraying the officer with mace.
- Acquaintances and relatives testified or gave statements indicating Flores admitted going to the Black residence with Childs to get money, claiming he shot the household dog while Childs shot Mrs. Black.

=== Subsequent challenges to circumstantial evidence ===
In a June 2025 habeas corpus application, Flores's attorneys challenged the reliability of the circumstantial evidence cited in earlier appellate decisions, presenting additional information regarding prosecution witnesses, investigative procedures, and evidence allegedly withheld from the defense. The application included affidavits from Flores's original trial attorney, Bradley K. Lollar, and former homicide detective James Trainum.

=== Alleged confessions and witness credibility ===
The 2025 application also challenged the reliability of testimony alleging that Flores had confessed to participating in the robbery. One witness, Homero Garcia, signed a statement prepared by law enforcement following a custodial interrogation. According to the defense, Garcia had been awake for several days, was under the influence of drugs, and faced criminal charges at the time of interrogation. The application alleged that prosecutors subsequently arranged favorable treatment in his criminal proceedings in connection with his testimony, without disclosing those benefits to the defense.

In a May 2025 affidavit, Lollar stated that he had not been informed of alleged agreements involving Garcia and other prosecution witnesses. He asserted that the absence of this information prevented the defense from fully challenging their credibility. The defense also questioned testimony involving firearms, noting that the .380-caliber pistol associated with Garcia had been forensically excluded as the murder weapon.

=== Witness testimony and timeline ===
The defense disputed the significance of testimony placing Flores with Richard Childs during the hours preceding Elizabeth Black's murder. Although several witnesses described seeing the two men together earlier that morning, the defense argued that these observations did not establish Flores's presence at the crime scene. Earlier proposed findings submitted by Flores's attorneys also identified discrepancies among the accounts of Vanessa Stovall, Jackie Roberts, and Doug Roberts concerning the movements of Childs and Flores. Doug Roberts testified that he saw Childs leave in the Volkswagen but he did not identify anyone accompanying Childs in the passenger seat.

=== Post-offense conduct and investigative concerns ===
The prosecution had also relied on Flores's actions after the murder, including the destruction of Childs's Volkswagen and Flores's subsequent flight, as circumstantial evidence of guilt. In his 2025 affidavit, Trainum questioned the use of such behavior to infer involvement in the original crime, cautioning against unsupported assumptions about how guilty or innocent suspects respond to criminal accusations. Trainum also identified concerns regarding the investigation's documentation, witness interviews, and handling of physical evidence.

The defense maintained that these problems were particularly significant because no physical evidence connected Flores to the murder scene. The new submissions formed part of Flores's 2025 claims of actual innocence and official misconduct. The Texas Court of Criminal Appeals dismissed the subsequent habeas application on procedural grounds in October 2025 without reaching the merits of those claims.

== Reactions ==
Supporters of Flores have long been calling his conviction and incarceration an injustice for a litany of reasons, including the use of forensic hypnosis, which the Texas Rangers stopped using voluntarily in 2021 and was outlawed in the state in 2023. His supporters further point out what they call another injustice: that his case is what sparked legislative reform that eventually led to the 2023 banning of the practice of forensic hypnosis in Texas, but that the law is not retroactive so it did not apply to his case.

As of February 2026, numerous organizations and experts continue to work on Flores's behalf to overturn his conviction and death sentence. Additionally, The Innocence Project has long sounded an alarm about forensic hypnosis, calling it "deeply unreliable."

Experts point to research demonstrating that "hypnotized subjects remembered less than those who were not hypnotized and omitted more details", and that "hypnosis increases subjects' confidence in their memories, regardless of whether those memories are accurate or not."

One expert on forensic hypnosis, Dr. Steven Lynn — who had, early in his career, been a "true believer" in the use of forensic hypnosis — "testified that the hypnosis in the Flores case had relied on this faulty concept of memory", and described Bargainer's identification of Flores as "astounding" 13 months after the crime.

John Wixted, a memory expert at the University of California, San Diego, said that “the latest memory science suggests Flores is innocent,” consistent with the witness’s initial rejection of a photo lineup that included Flores. He also said that the actual perpetrator likely matched the eyewitness’s original description and composite sketch: a white male with long hair.

In a February 2026 episode of Pablo Torre Finds Out, Innocence Project board member and record executive Jason Flom stated about the use of the law of parties in Flores' case "It's shocking to a lot of people and it should be shocking to everyone: the idea that the state can say 'we know you didn't kill anybody, but we're going to execute you anyway.'"

== Claim of Actual Innocence ==
Charles Don Flores has maintained his innocence in the 1998 murder of Elizabeth Black. His post-conviction legal team, including attorney Gretchen S. Sween of Sween Law and attorneys Chase Baumgartner and Allison Clayton of the Innocence Project of Texas, has pursued habeas corpus relief based on claims of actual innocence, developments in eyewitness-identification science, and alleged official misconduct.

In a June 10, 2025 subsequent application for a writ of habeas corpus, Flores's attorneys formally asserted that he was entitled to relief because he was "actually innocent". The application presented expert opinions and affidavits challenging the reliability of evidence used to secure his conviction, as well as allegations that potentially favorable evidence had been withheld from his trial defense.

=== Eyewitness identification and scientific evidence ===
Flores's actual-innocence claim relies substantially on the analysis of psychologist John Wixted, an expert in eyewitness memory. Wixted examined the initial identification procedures involving eyewitness Jill Barganier, who did not identify Flores in a photographic lineup before subsequently identifying him during the trial following an investigative hypnosis session.

The application presented this scientific evidence both as support for Flores's actual-innocence claim and as the basis for the relief under Article 11.073 of the Texas Code of Criminal Procedure, which permits certain post-conviction challenges based on changed scientific evidence.

=== Disputed testimony and alleged official misconduct ===
Flores's attorneys have also challenged the reliability of prosecution testimony concerning alleged admissions of involvement in the crime. The purported admissions were attributed to Flores by prosecution witnesses rather than established through a recorded confession.

The 2025 habeas application included an affidavit from Bradley K. Lollar, Flores's original trial attorney, discussing information that he stated had not been disclosed to the defense at trial. The application also incorporated an analysis by retired homicide detective James Trainum, who examined aspects of the original investigation.

The defense alleged that prosecutors failed to disclose favorable evidence, including information potentially relevant to impeaching prosecution witnesses. Flores's attorneys argued that these alleged omissions, considered alongside the disputed eyewitness identification and circumstantial evidence, substantially undermined the reliability of the conviction.

=== Actual innocence claim and legal proceedings ===
In his June 2025 application, Flores formally asserted actual innocence as a separate ground for post-conviction relief. His attorneys argued that the cumulative evidentiary record, including contemporary eyewitness-memory research and previously unavailable information about the investigation and prosecution witnesses, demonstrated that no reasonable juror would convict him if presented with the full evidence.

The Texas Court of Criminal Appeals dismissed the application on October 9, 2025, concluding that it did not satisfy the procedural requirements for a subsequent habeas application under Article 11.071, Section 5. The court did not review the merits of Flores's four claims.

In February 2026, Gretchen Sween petitioned the United States Supreme Court for review, arguing that the Texas court's treatment of Flores's innocence claims violated constitutional due process.

== Appeals ==
Flores has appealed his conviction and sentence at least four times. One appeal, which was filed in 2016, was denied in 2020 without weighing the merits of forensic hypnosis.

In 2021, the United States Supreme Court declined to hear Flores' case. The Innocence Project, in an amicus curiae brief, pointed to another flaw in Barganier's identification of Flores; at the time the two suspects got out of the car, "the sun had not risen, and there were no street lights on her block."

In 2025, the Texas Court of Criminal Appeals (CCA) denied Flores' fourth appeal without explanation. Flores' attorney stated, however, that as of October 2025, the CCA is "still considering her suggestion that the court reconsider the claim challenging the use of investigative hypnosis to convict Flores."

In February 2026 Flores' attorney, Gretchen Sween, filed a writ of certiorari petition with the United States Supreme Court on Flores' behalf. Magicians Penn & Teller filed an amicus brief in support of the petition, calling investigative hypnosis "junk science of the worst sort" that uses the same deceptive techniques as stage magicians. The American Psychological Association, also filed an amicus brief, saying "extensive psychological research has made clear, eyewitness identifications are often not accurate—and [m]istaken eyewitness identification is a primary contributor to criminal convictions of the innocent."

== In popular culture ==
Flores' case was featured in three episodes of Pablo Torre Finds Out, two of which featured interviews with Flores from death row; one of the episodes was nominated for a Peabody Award.

Flores's case was also featured in a TEDx Talk The new science of eyewitness memory, given by psychologist and memory researcher John Wixted.

Flores' case is the subject of the fifth season of the Texas Observer podcast, The Unforgotten: Riding Shotgun.
