= Graczyk =

Graczyk is a Polish surname, it may refer to:

- Ed Graczyk (born 1941/1942), American playwright
- Jean Graczyk (1933–2004), French professional bicycle racer
- Jim Graczyk (born 1969), American researcher and author on the subject of ghosts
- Kristen Graczyk (born 1983), American former soccer forward and defender
- Michael Graczyk (born 1950), American journalist
