= James Grigson =

Texan forensic psychiatrist

- Born: James Paul Grigson Jr. January 30, 1932; Texarkana, Texas, U.S.
- Died: June 3, 2004 (aged 72); Dallas, Texas
- Other name: Dr. Death
- Known for: Testifying expert for the prosecution in capital cases
- Scientific career
- Fields: Forensic psychiatry

James Paul Grigson Jr. (January 30, 1932 – June 3, 2004), nicknamed "Dr. Death" by some press accounts, was a Texas forensic psychiatrist who testified in 167 capital trials, nearly all of which resulted in death sentences. He was exposed as a charlatan and expelled by the American Psychiatric Association and the Texas Society of Psychiatric Physicians in 1995 for unethical conduct. He testified in 57 cases after losing his APA accreditation.

== Career ==
In capital crime cases, Grigson, throughout his career, was typically an expert witness for the prosecution. Under Texas law, for death to be imposed, the jury must believe the defendant not only to be guilty of the crime charged but likely to commit additional violent crimes if not put to death. In almost every case, Grigson testified, often after meeting the defendant for just a few minutes or not at all, that the defendant was an incurable sociopath who was one hundred percent certain to kill again.

In the late 1980s, an investigation conducted by the Dallas attorney general's office looked into the post-conviction outcomes of murder convicts whom Grigson had testified against. Contrary to expectations set by Grigson's testimony, those who were still in prison were generally nonviolent and cooperative. Of the twelve paroled convicts they were able to speak to, only one had committed a crime after release.

== Cases ==
=== Randall Dale Adams ===
One of the most notable, at least after the fact, appearances of Grigson in court occurred in the 1977 case of Randall Dale Adams, who was accused of murdering police officer Robert W. Wood. Adams was found guilty and, on the basis of Grigson's testimony, was given the death penalty. Grigson told the jury that Adams would be an ongoing menace if kept alive.

In 1980, Adams' death sentence was commuted to life in prison by Texas Governor Bill Clements, and in 1989, the Texas Court of Criminal Appeals overturned Adams' conviction on the grounds of malfeasance by the prosecutor and inconsistencies in the testimony of a key witness. The prosecution declined to go to a new trial, and Adams was eventually freed after having spent approximately 12 years in prison.

The case was profiled in the 1988 documentary film The Thin Blue Line.

=== Kerry Max Cook ===
In 1978, Kerry Max Cook was found guilty of capital murder and sentenced to death following Grigson's testimony in which he stated that Cook was a severe sociopath and a very serious threat to others. In 1997, the Texas Court of Criminal Appeals overturned Cook's conviction on the grounds of prosecutorial and police misconduct, and he was freed after agreeing to plead no contest to a time-served sentence.

=== Cameron Todd Willingham ===
In 1991, Cameron Todd Willingham was accused of the capital murder of his three children due to arson. Grigson testified that Willingham was an incurable sociopath despite having never met him. His testimony helped prosecutors secure the death penalty, but Willingham's guilt has since been called into question due to modern fire science and a witness recantation. Willingham was executed in 2004 at the age of 36 years old.

=== Jeffery Lee Wood ===
In 1998, Jeffery Lee Wood was tried for capital murder under the Texas law of parties. Based on a hypothetical question and without having evaluated Wood, Grigson testified that Wood posed a future threat to society, which subsequently resulted in a death sentence for Wood.

At the time of Grigson's testimony, he had been expelled from the American Psychiatric Association and the Texas Society of Psychiatric Physicians for ethical violations in his court testimonies. Wood had no prior felonies or history of violent crime prior to his arrest, and evidence excluded in court supports his claim that he was acting under duress during the robbery. As of 2026, Wood remains on death row with no scheduled date of execution.

=== Other defendants ===
Executed defendants whose cases Grigson testified in include Aaron Lee Fuller, Bernard Eugene Amos, David Lee Holland, David Wayne Stoker, Gayland Charles Bradford, Gerald Wayne Tigner, Gregory Lynn Summers, Hai Hai Vuong, Jack Wade Clark, James Edward Clayton, John Glenn Moody, John Russell Thompson, John Thomas Satterwhite, Mack Oran Hill, Noble Mays Jr., Patrick Fitzgerald Rogers, Samuel Christopher Hawkins, Thomas Andy Barefoot, and William Hamilton Little. Michael Dewayne Johnson killed himself around 15 hours before his scheduled execution in 2005.

== Expulsion ==
Grigson was reprimanded on two occasions in the early 1980s by the American Psychiatric Association, and in 1995, he was expelled from both the American Psychiatric Association and the Texas Society of Psychiatric Physicians for unethical conduct. The American Psychiatric Association stated that Grigson had violated the organization's ethics code by "arriving at a psychiatric diagnosis without first having examined the individuals in question and for indicating while testifying in court as an expert witness that he could predict with one hundred percent certainty that the individuals would engage in future violent acts". Grigson unsuccessfully sued the American Psychiatric Association to block his expulsion.

After Grigson's expulsion, the medical director of the American Academy of Psychiatry and the Law said that Grigson "oversteps the bounds of his professional competence" and that he was testifying in court about hypothetical situations containing insufficient detail for a sound professional opinion to be formed.

Grigson officially retired from the psychiatric profession in 2003.

== Death ==
Grigson died in Dallas, Texas, in June 2004 from lung cancer.
