= Randall Dale Adams =

American man wrongfully convicted of murder and anti-death penalty activist (1948–2010)

- Adams after his arrest in 1976
- Born: December 17, 1948; Grove City, Ohio, U.S.
- Died: October 30, 2010 (aged 61); Washington Court House, Ohio, U.S.
- Occupation: U.S. anti-death penalty activist
- Criminal charge: Murder
- Criminal penalty: Death by lethal injection; commuted to life in prison
- Criminal status: Convicted (1977); overturned (1989)
- Spouse: Jill Fratta (m. 1999)

Randall Dale Adams (December 17, 1948 – October 30, 2010) was an American man wrongfully convicted of murder and sentenced to death after the 1976 shooting of Dallas police officer Robert W. Wood. His conviction was overturned in 1989.

Adams staunchly maintained his innocence throughout. He insisted the killer was actually David Ray Harris, who had offered Adams a ride on the day of the shooting after Adams had car troubles. Under an immunity agreement, Harris testified for the prosecution that Adams shot Wood. Based on this testimony and other alleged eyewitnesses, Adams was found guilty and imprisoned on death row. In 1980, his sentence was commuted to life in prison.

While incarcerated for the crime, Adams was the subject of the 1988 documentary film The Thin Blue Line, which was cited as instrumental in his exoneration the following year. Writer-director Errol Morris discovered Harris had repeatedly bragged about shooting a police officer. Additionally, Morris uncovered evidence of prosecutorial misconduct and eyewitness misidentification. Six months after the film's release, Adams's conviction was overturned by the Texas Court of Criminal Appeals and prosecutors declined to retry the case. Adams received no compensation from the state of Texas for the 12 years he spent in prison. He died of a brain tumor in 2010.

== Early life and education ==
Adams was born in Grove City, Ohio, the youngest of five children of Ola Mildred Hamilton Adams (known as Mildred, 1923–2011) and Canso Adams (1905–1960), a miner who died of pneumoconiosis. Adams graduated from high school in 1967, and spent three years as a U.S. Army paratrooper.

== Murder conviction ==
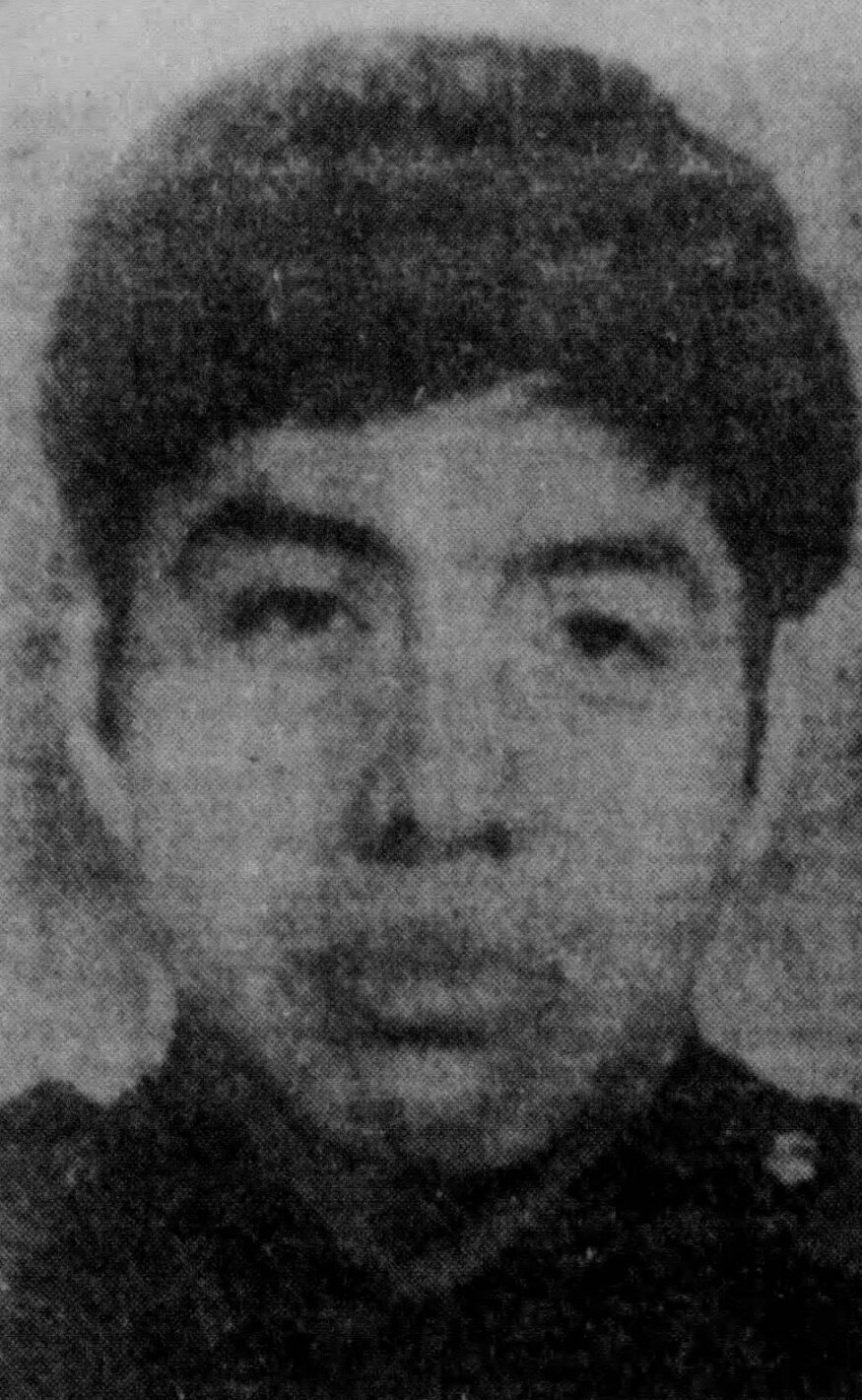
Wood c. 1976

In October 1976, 27-year-old Randall Adams and his brother left Ohio for California. En route, they arrived in Dallas on Thanksgiving night. The next morning, Adams was offered a contracting job. On the following Saturday, November 27, Adams went to start work but no one turned up because it was a weekend. On the way home, his car ran out of fuel.

David Ray Harris, who had just turned sixteen, passed Adams in a car that he had stolen from his neighbor in Vidor, Texas, before driving to Dallas with his father's pistol and a shotgun. Harris offered Adams a ride. The two spent the day together, during which they drank alcohol and smoked marijuana. That evening they went to a movie, where they saw The Student Body and The Swinging Cheerleaders.

That evening, Robert W. Wood, a Dallas police officer, was working the graveyard shift with his partner, Teresa Turko, one of the first female police officers in Dallas to be assigned to patrol duty. Shortly after midnight on November 28, Wood stopped Harris' stolen car in the 3400 block of North Hampton Road because the car's headlights were not on. As Wood approached, he was shot twice in the forearm and chest by someone in the car. The vehicle sped off almost immediately after the shooting, giving Wood's partner little time to react; she later testified that she managed to fire upon the fleeing vehicle but to no avail.

The Dallas Police Department investigation led back to Harris, who, after returning to Vidor, had boasted to friends that he was responsible for the crime. Harris was arrested, but when he was interviewed by police, he accused Adams of the murder. Harris led police to the car driven from the scene of the crime, as well as to a .22 Short caliber revolver he identified as the murder weapon.

=== Trial ===
Dallas prosecutor Douglas D. Mulder charged Adams with the crime, despite the evidence against Harris, apparently because Harris was a juvenile at the time and Adams, as an adult, could be sentenced to death under Texas law. Adams testified that after leaving the drive-in movie, Harris dropped Adams off at his motel, where Adams and his brother watched TV and then went to sleep. He claimed he was not in the car when the shooting happened. Harris testified that Adams was not only in the car, but was the driver, as well as the shooter of Officer Wood.

Testimony by Harris and several questionable eyewitnesses – including Emily Miller and R.L. Miller, who claimed to have driven past Harris' stopped vehicle immediately before the shooting – led to Adams's conviction. Texas forensic psychiatrist James Grigson (who became known as "Dr. Death") was also a witness for the prosecution. Having conducted a psychiatric evaluation of Adams, he told the jury that Adams would be an ongoing menace if kept alive. As a result of this testimony, Adams was given the death penalty. His conviction was unanimously upheld by the Texas Courts of Appeals in 1979.

In 1995, Grigson was expelled from the American Psychiatric Association and the Texas Society of Psychiatric Physicians for unethical conduct relating to expert witness testimony.

=== Commutation of death sentence ===
Adams's execution was originally scheduled for May 8, 1979, but U.S. Supreme Court Justice Lewis F. Powell Jr. ordered a stay three days before the scheduled date. In 1980, the Supreme Court on an 8–1 vote ruled unconstitutional a Texas requirement for jurors to swear an oath that the mandatory imposition of a death sentence or a life sentence would not interfere with their consideration of factual matters, such as guilt or innocence, during a trial. As a result of the decision, Adams' death sentence was reversed and the Texas Court of Criminal Appeals granted him a new trial. Before the trial could begin, however, Texas Governor Bill Clements commuted Adams's sentence to life in prison at the request of the Dallas County District Attorney.

== Exoneration ==
In May 1988, David Ray Harris, by that point himself a prisoner on death row, admitted that Adams was not even in the car on the night of the murder. The August 1988 release of the documentary film The Thin Blue Line, which detailed the many inconsistencies in the prosecution's line of reasoning, further cast doubt on Adams's guilt, but the case remained in legal limbo.

In 1989, the Texas Court of Criminal Appeals in Ex parte Adams overturned Adams's conviction on the grounds of malfeasance by the prosecutor Douglas D. Mulder and inconsistencies in the testimony of a key witness, Emily Miller. The appeals court found that Mulder withheld a statement by Miller to the police that cast doubt on her credibility and also allowed her to give perjured testimony. Furthermore, the court found that after Adams's attorney discovered the statement late in Adams' trial, Mulder falsely told the court that he did not know Miller's whereabouts. The Texas Court of Criminal Appeals stated that "conviction was unfair mainly because of prosecutor Doug Mulder." Mulder had returned to practicing private law in Dallas in 1981. Following the appeals court decision, the case was returned to Dallas County for a retrial, but the district attorney's office decided not to prosecute the case again based on the length of time since the original crime, and Adams was subsequently released.

Despite being wrongly imprisoned for 12 years, Adams received no compensation from the state of Texas. If Adams had been found to be wrongly convicted under present-day Texas law, he would be entitled to receive $80,000 for each year of incarceration. Additionally, at the time his conviction was thrown out, wrongly convicted prisoners could get a lump sum payment of $25,000 if pardoned by the governor. However, since Adams was released because his case was dismissed, and not because he was pardoned, he received no payment from the state after his release.

=== David Ray Harris ===
David Ray Harris

David Ray Harris had testified in the original trial that he was the passenger in the stolen car, that he allowed Adams to drive, and that Adams committed the murder. He recanted this testimony at Adams's habeas corpus hearing, but never admitted guilt in a judicial setting and was never charged in the case. On June 30, 2004, Harris was executed by lethal injection for the unrelated 1985 murder of Mark Mays in Beaumont, Texas, which occurred during an attempted abduction of Mays's girlfriend.

== Lawsuit ==
After his release from prison, Adams ended up in a legal battle with Errol Morris, the director of The Thin Blue Line, concerning the rights to his story. The matter was settled out of court after Adams was granted sole use of anything written or made on the subject of his life. Adams said of the matter: "Mr. Morris felt he had the exclusive rights to my life story. ... I did not sue Errol Morris for any money or any percentages of The Thin Blue Line, though the media portrayed it that way."

Morris, for his part, recalled: "When he got out, he became very angry at the fact that he had signed a release giving me rights to his life story. And he felt as though I had stolen something from him. Maybe I had, maybe I just don't understand what it's like to be in prison for that long, for a crime you hadn't committed. In a certain sense, the whole crazy deal with the release was fueled by my relationship with his attorney. And it's a long, complicated story, but I guess when people are involved, there's always a mess somewhere."

== Activism and personal life ==
While in prison, Adams earned a correspondence-course degree from Lee College in Baytown, Texas. Adams later worked as an anti-death penalty activist. He wrote a book about his story, Adams v. Texas, which was published in June 1992. In 2001, at an anti-death penalty legislative hearing on behalf of the Texas Moratorium Network, Adams said:

The man you see before you is here by the grace of God. The fact that it took 12-and-a-half years and a movie to prove my innocence should scare the hell out of everyone in this room and, if it doesn't, then that scares the hell out of me.

In 1999, Adams married Jill Fratta, the sister of a death-row inmate.

== Death ==
Adams died of a brain tumor in Washington Court House, Ohio on October 30, 2010, at the age of 61. He lived a quiet life divorced from his past. According to his lawyer, Randy Schaffer, the death was at the time reported only locally and was not widely reported until June 25, 2011.

== See also ==
- Capital punishment in Texas
- Capital punishment in the United States
- List of exonerated death row inmates
- List of wrongful convictions in the United States
- Derek Bentley
