= Texas Moratorium Network =

US non-profit organization

Texas Moratorium Network (TMN) is a grassroots non-profit organization with the primary goal of mobilizing statewide support for a moratorium on executions in Texas. It has about 20,000 members, about 85 percent of whom reside in Texas. Founded in 2000, the network advocates for change with local governments and the Texas state legislature, and organizes community awareness events.

== History ==
The Texas Moratorium Network was founded in 2000 by several people who had been involved in organizing a march held in Austin, Texas on October 15, 2000, to protest capital punishment in Texas under then-Governor George W. Bush. The march has since become an annual event regularly attended by anti-death penalty activists from across Texas and other states, and Europe. The Network is funded by donations from individuals as well as grants from foundations, including multiple grants from both the Tides Foundation and Resist, Inc.

In the 2001 session of the Texas Legislature, the Network advocated in favor of legislation that would have enacted a moratorium on executions. The moratorium legislation was favorably reported out of the Senate Committee on Criminal Justice and the House Committee on Criminal Jurisprudence. Randall Dale Adams and Kerry Max Cook, innocent men who had been exonerated after spending years on Texas Death Row, both testified in favor of the moratorium legislation. The committees also heard from Jeanette Popp, whose daughter was murdered in Austin in 1988. She testified that two innocent men, Christopher Ochoa and Richard Danziger, had been wrongfully convicted of her daughter's murder and had spent twelve years in prison before being exonerated and released. The real killer of her daughter, Achim Joseph Marino, was later convicted and sentenced to life in prison after Popp asked the district attorney not to seek the death penalty against him. Popp served as chairperson of the Network from 2001 to 2004, when she resigned for health reasons. In the 2001 session of the Texas Legislature, a bill reached the floor of the Texas House that, if passed, would have enacted a moratorium on executions. The bill received 53 votes in favor of a moratorium.

In 2003, the Network convinced the Travis County Commissioners Court to pass a resolution calling for a moratorium on executions. In the summer of 2004, members of the Network persuaded the Texas Democratic Party to endorse a moratorium in the party platform. The party again endorsed a moratorium in the 2006 and 2008 platforms. After Ernest Willis was exonerated and released from Texas Death Row on October 6, 2004, the Network created the Texas Death Penalty Innocence Freedom Fund and donated US$1,000 to Willis to help him until he received compensation from the State of Texas, which later compensated Willis a total of US$429,166 for the more than seventeen years he spent on death row for a crime he had not committed.

After the September 14, 2005 execution of Frances Newton, the Network conducted a fundraising campaign which raised about US$1,000 to help Newton's family pay the funeral expenses. Newton was the first African-American woman executed in Texas since a slave named Lucy was hanged March 5, 1858, in Galveston County for murder.

In 2007, the Network collected signatures from members of the general public on a judicial complaint with the State Commission on Judicial Conduct against Sharon Keller, presiding Judge of the Texas Court of Criminal Appeals, after she said "We close at 5" and refused to accept an appeal 20 minutes after 5 pm from Michael Richard's attorneys on the day of his execution. Members of the Network held a protest on the sidewalk in front of Keller's home and created the website SharonKiller.com. The U.S. Supreme Court had earlier accepted for consideration Baze v. Rees from Kentucky, in which two death row inmates were challenging the constitutionality of lethal injection as a method of execution. On February 19, 2009, the State Commission on Judicial Conduct charged Keller with five counts of misconduct. The commission charged Keller with dereliction of duty, denying Richard his right to access to the courts and incompetence in office. A trial on the charges was held August 17–20, 2009, in a San Antonio courtroom. the Network held a protest outside the courthouse.

In 2008, the Network created a political action committee to support candidates who oppose the death penalty or support a moratorium.

In 2009, the Network led an advocacy campaign to pass a bill to end the death penalty for people convicted under the law of parties. The bill was approved by the Texas House of Representatives, but did not pass the Senate. The Law of Parties applies when someone takes part in one crime – robbery, for example – and does not kill anyone themselves or intend that anyone be killed but "should have anticipated" a murder by an accomplice.

On June 2, 2009, the Network coordinated protests in several Texas cities, Canada and Europe of the 200th execution in Texas since Rick Perry became governor of Texas in December 2000.

After Anthony Charles Graves was released on October 27, 2010, after 18 years on Texas death for a crime he did not commit, the Network collected $3,000 in donations from its supporters and gave it to Graves on November 20, 2010.

When Alfred Dewayne Brown was released on June 8, 2015, after more than ten years on Texas death row for a crime he did not commit, the Network collected more than $6,000 for Brown in donations using the crowdfunding site Indiegogo Life.

== Death penalty art show ==
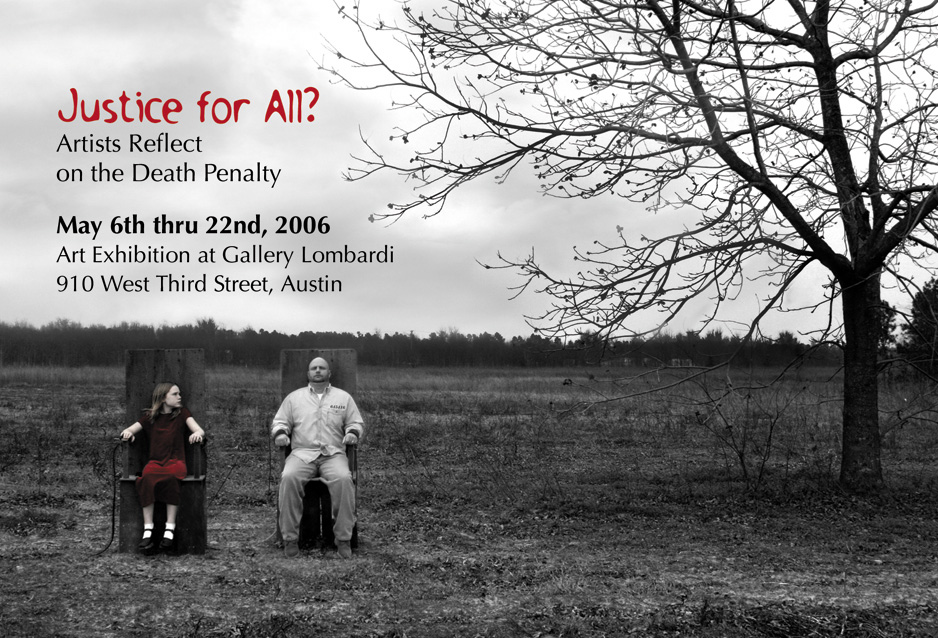
"Justice for All? Artists Reflect on the Death Penalty", May 6–22, 2006

The Network held an international, all-media, juried art show on the death penalty in Austin, Texas, at Gallery Lombardi May 6–22, 2006, entitled "Justice for All?: Artists Reflect on the Death Penalty". The show was juried by Annette Carlozzi, head curator of the Blanton Museum of Art's Contemporary and American Art collection; Lora Reynolds of Lora Reynolds Gallery; and Malaquias Montoya, artist and professor at UC Davis. More than 300 artists from 19 countries submitted more than 700 pieces of art to the show. The jury selected 55 works for the exhibition at Gallery Lombardi. The art show was funded in part by the City of Austin through the Cultural Arts Division and by a grant from the Texas Commission on the Arts. The death penalty art show was investigated under the "Notoriety for Profit" law by the Austin Police Department at the request of Andy Kahan, the City of Houston Mayor's Director of Crime-Victim Services. Kahan opposes the sale of art created by incarcerated people. A Gallery Lombardi spokesperson said they did indeed sell a drawing of a cross by an inmate for $50 – to a nun.

The Austin Chronicle called the art show "nothing short of powerful".

The art show was exhibited at Houston's M^{2} Gallery February 10–18, 2007.

A selection of the artworks from the show were exhibited in the Texas Capitol Building March 12–17, 2007, but a state representative personally removed two pieces of art on display at the Capitol that he found objectionable. State Rep. Borris Miles said the artworks were "extremely inappropriate and highly objectionable."

== Annual events ==
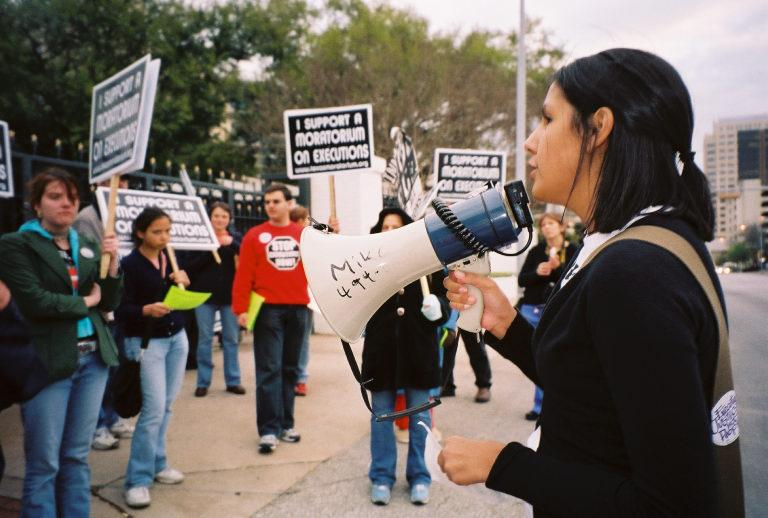
Students rally during the 2005 Anti-Death Penalty Alternative Spring Break.

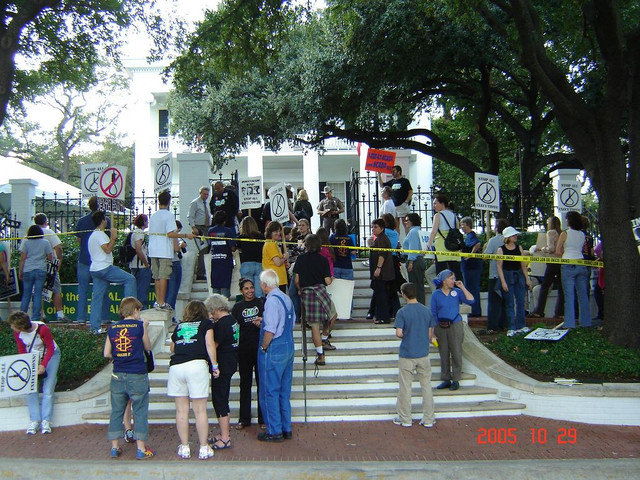
Protesters gather at the front gate of the Texas governor's mansion during the 6th Annual March to Stop Executions.

Anti-Death Penalty Alternative Spring Break brings students to Austin each March for several days of education and activism against the death penalty. The first alternative spring break program was held in 2004. After the 2005 Anti-Death Penalty Alternative Spring Break, several participants founded Texas Students Against the Death Penalty. Students participating in the alternative spring break in 2006 traveled to Huntsville, Texas to take part in a protest of the execution of Tommie Hughes on March 15, 2006. In 2007, MTV featured the alternative spring break in its program The Amazing Break.

March to Abolish the Death Penalty, is the current name of an event held each October since 2000 in cooperation with several Texas and national anti-death penalty organizations, including Texas Moratorium Network, the Austin chapter of the Campaign to End the Death Penalty, the Texas Death Penalty Abolition Movement and Texas Students Against the Death Penalty. The first march was called the "March on the Mansion" and was held on October 15, 2000. The second and third marches were called "March for a Moratorium" and were held on October 27, 2001, and October 12, 2002. In 2003, the march name changed to "March to Stop Executions". Clarence Brandley, who had been exonerated and released from death row in 1990 after spending nine years there, spoke at the 2003 march, saying "I was always wishing and hoping that someone would just look at the evidence and the facts, because the evidence was clear that I did not commit the crime." The "5th Annual March to Stop Executions" was on October 30, 2004. The "6th Annual March to Stop Executions" was held October 29, 2005, in conjunction with the 2005 National Conference of the National Coalition to Abolish the Death Penalty, which came to Austin at the invitation of the march organizers.

The "7th Annual March to Stop Executions", which was sponsored by a record number of 50 organizations, was held October 28, 2006, and included family members of Carlos DeLuna and Cameron Todd Willingham, who both had been the subject of separate investigations by the Chicago Tribune that concluded they could have been wrongfully executed. Standing outside the gates of the Texas Governor's Mansion with hundreds of supporters, the families of Willingham and De Luna delivered separate letters to Governor Perry asking him to stop executions and investigate the cases of Willingham and De Luna to determine if they were wrongfully executed. After DPS troopers refused to take the letters, Mary Arredondo, sister of Carlos De Luna, and Eugenia Willingham, stepmother of Todd, dropped them through the gate of the governor's mansion and left them lying on the walkway leading to the main door. The "8th Annual March to Stop Executions" was held in Houston on October 27, 2007. The "9th Annual March to Stop Executions" was October 25, 2008 in Houston. The "10th Annual March to Abolish the Death Penalty" was attended by hundreds of people on October 24, 2009, in Austin.

== Leadership ==
Jeanette Popp was Chairperson of Texas Moratorium Network from 2001 to 2004. Popp's daughter Nancy was murdered in Austin in 1988. She became intimately familiar with the many flaws of the Texas criminal justice system after two innocent men were wrongfully convicted of her daughter's murder and spent 12 years in prison. They were exonerated and released in 2001. The real killer was convicted in December 2001. Popp successfully pressured the Travis County District Attorney not to seek the death penalty for her daughter's murderer. Her riveting testimony in 2001 helped convince two Texas legislative committees to vote in favor of moratorium legislation. She frequently travels across the nation speaking out against the death penalty. In 2004, Popp was the Democratic nominee for Texas State Representative in District 99. In 2009, Popp published Mortal Justice: A True Story of Murder and Vindication, with co-author Wanda Evans.

Scott Cobb is president of the Network. Cobb originally became actively involved in the anti-death penalty effort in 2000, when he contacted several Texas anti-death penalty organizations by email proposing a march against the death penalty during the campaign in which then-Texas Governor George W. Bush was running for U.S. president. Members of Campaign to End the Death Penalty responded positively to the idea and the "March on the Mansion" was held on October 15, 2000. Cobb served as the Network's political director prior to becoming president in 2004. Cobb was appointed to the Texas Democratic Party Chair's Advisory Committee on the Platform in 2004. He convinced the party to endorse a moratorium on executions in the party platform.
