= Kenneth Foster (criminal) =

American prisoner

- Born: Kenneth Eugene Foster Jr. October 22, 1976 (age 50); Texas, U.S.
- Known for: Controversial conviction and death sentence
- Status: Incarcerated
- Convictions: Capital murder (2 counts); Aggravated assault with a deadly weapon (2 counts)
- Penalty: Death; commuted to life imprisonment with the possibility of parole after 40 years, later sentenced to life without parole

Details
- Locations: San Antonio, Texas, U.S. Bowie County, Texas, Texas, U.S.
- Date apprehended: August 15, 1996

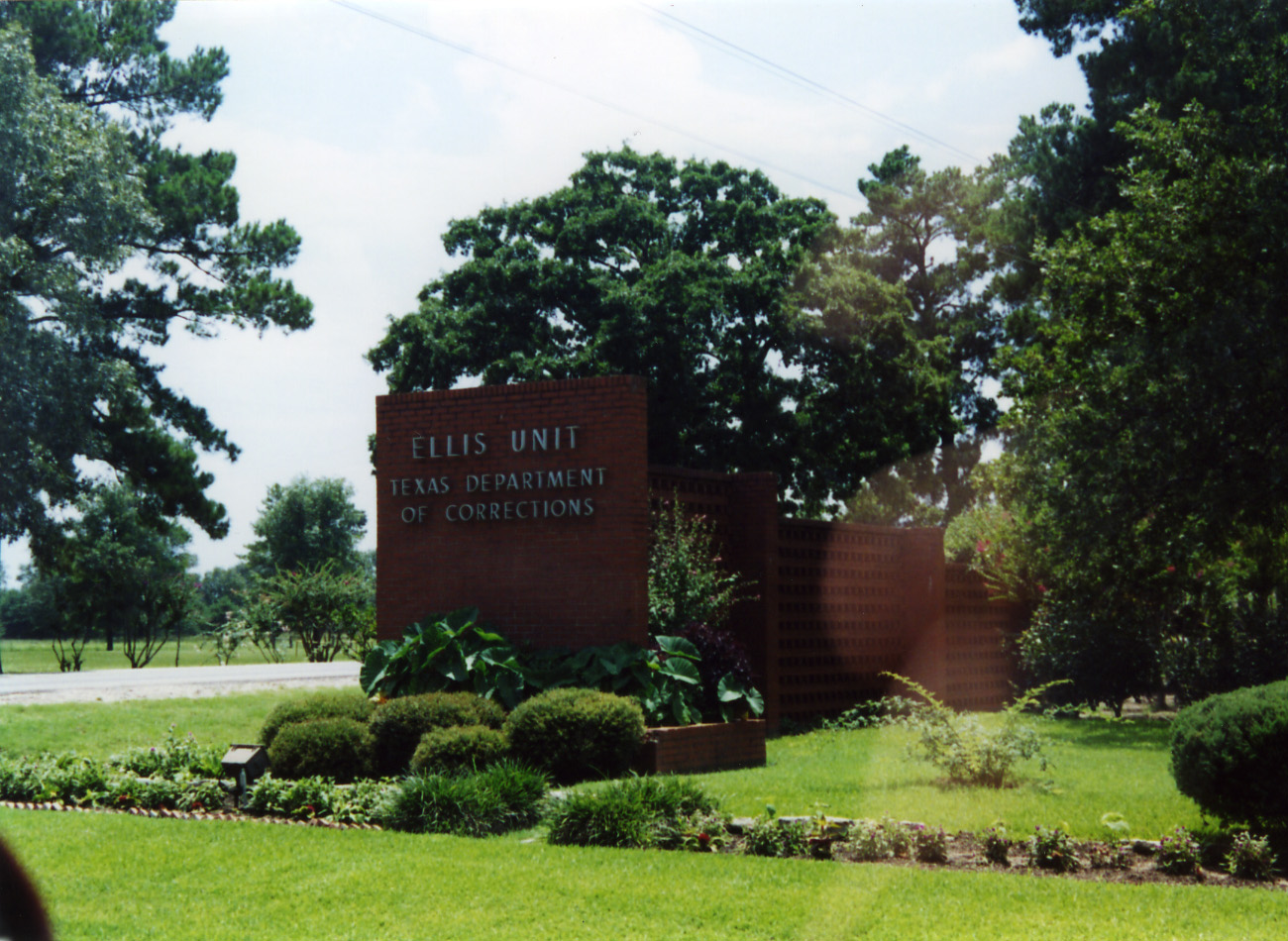
The Ellis Unit housed the State of Texas death row for men until mid-1999.

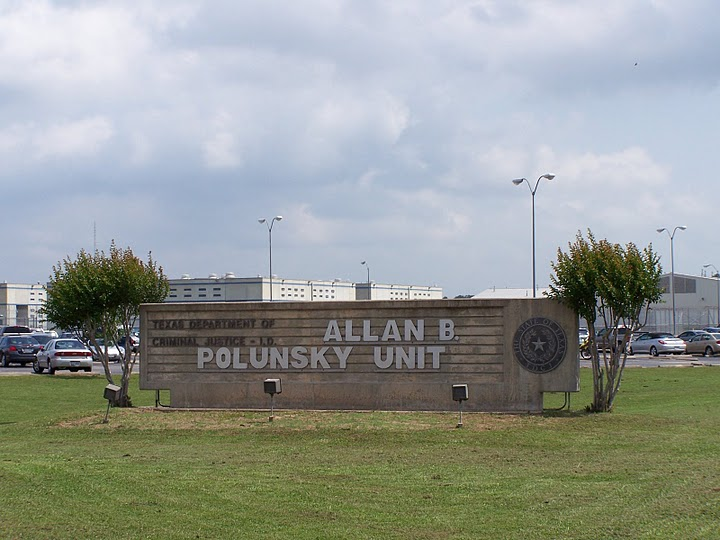
Allan B. Polunsky Unit houses the State of Texas death row for men.

Kenneth Eugene Foster Jr. (born October 22, 1976) is a prisoner formerly on death row in Texas, convicted under the Texas law of parties. He was convicted as an accomplice to the robbery and murder of Michael LaHood Jr. on August 15, 1996, at 2:46 a.m., despite not firing a shot. On that same night, Foster, along with three of his friends, Julius Steen, Mauriceo Brown, and Dwayne Dillard, were driving around San Antonio committing armed robberies. Eventually, the group found LaHood outside his parents' home. From there, Mauriceo Brown exited the car and killed him with a shot to the head. Foster's conviction and death sentence were contested because he was convicted under the law of parties, not for physically committing the crime.

While Texas law uses the phrase, "law of parties," this concept is simply a form of "felony murder," a ubiquitous legal standard well known in both common law and by statute. 43 of the 50 United States have some form of felony murder. Under felony murder, a person may be criminally liable if the accused causes the death of another person in the course of committing a separate felony. Of the 43 states with some form of felony murder, there are at least four approaches related to variables such as degree of negligence, proof of "malice," or in 28 states proof of a related death and the mere act of committing the separate felony are sufficient.

Foster, Texas Department of Criminal Justice (TDCJ) death row #999232, was received on death row on July 1, 1997. He was initially located in the Ellis Unit, but was transferred to the Allan B. Polunsky Unit (formerly the Terrell Unit) in 1999.

== Initial death sentence ==
At the sentencing phase of Foster's murder trial, the prosecution presented evidence of other crimes in which he had been involved. Foster was a member of the Hoover '74 Crips gang, sold a pipe bomb to an undercover officer at a high school, participated in the armed robbery and carjacking of a tourist the day before the murder, and had previously been arrested for selling crack cocaine. Testimony also showed that on October 17, 1994, Foster, without provocation, had shot from a moving vehicle at another vehicle. He pleaded guilty to two counts of aggravated assault with a deadly weapon in that case after his murder conviction.

Texas Governor Rick Perry commuted the death sentence to 40 years to life imprisonment only six hours before the execution was scheduled to take place on August 30, 2007. Foster will be eligible for parole in 2036. He was then incarcerated at the Stiles Facility of the Texas Department of Criminal Justice and subsequently assigned to the facility's administrative segregation. Mauriceo Brown, the man who pulled the trigger on Michael LaHood Jr., was executed on July 19, 2006. Dwayne Dillard was sentenced to life in prison for murdering a taxi driver two weeks before LaHood's murder. Julius Steen was convicted of aggravated robbery and also received a life sentence.

== Second murder conviction ==
On November 6, 2021, while serving his life sentence at the Telford Unit, fellow inmate Anthony Dominguez was killed by injuries consistent with a physical altercation. Video footage identified Foster as the man who killed Dominguez, who was serving a 10-year sentence for aggravated assault on a family member with a deadly weapon. Foster claimed self-defense at his trial. In November 2024, Foster was sentenced to life without parole for a second capital murder conviction in connection with Dominguez's death.

== See also ==
- Capital punishment in Texas
- Capital punishment in the United States
- List of people executed in Texas, 2000–2009
- List of people executed in the United States in 2006
