= Texas Students Against the Death Penalty =

Texas student-led anti-death penalty organization

Texas Students Against the Death Penalty (TSADP) is the first student-run anti-death penalty (non-profit) organization in Texas that works to end the death penalty in Texas through campaigns of public education and the promotion of youth activism.

== History ==
TSADP is an organization of students from high school and college campuses around Texas. TSADP was founded in 2005 by a group of young high school students and with a donation by the Texas Moratorium Network.

One of TSADP's accomplishments has been its involvement in starting more than 15 new anti-death penalty student organizations in Texas, and generating publicity in local media outlets. Some of the newspapers and news channels that have covered TSADP are NPR, MTV, The San Antonio Express News, Austin American-Statesman, The Houston Press, local news channels and many student publications. TSADP is involved in launching new groups or helping other local anti-death penalty groups organize protests and vigils on execution days. TSADP is one of the sponsors of the Annual "March to Stop Executions" in Texas. Currently, TSADP is working with Texas Moratorium Network on a campaign to pass moratorium resolutions in the San Antonio and Austin City Councils and in several student governments, including at The University of Texas at Austin.

== Anti-Death Penalty Spring Break ==
The "Anti-Death Penalty Alternative Spring Break" was started by Texas Moratorium Network in 2004. It is now organized by Texas Students Against the Death Penalty and co-sponsored by TMN, Campus Progress at the Center for American Progress, Campaign to End the Death Penalty, Texas Coalition to Abolish the Death Penalty and Murder Victims' Families for Human Rights. The "2009 Anti-Death Penalty Alternative Spring Break" was March 12–16.

Alternative Spring Breaks are designed to give students something to do during their week off. The specific purpose of the Alternative Spring Break was to bring students to Austin for five days of anti-death penalty activism, education and entertainment. Activities included a Death Penalty Issues Lobby Day and a direct action day.

The majority of the participants were students. The events and workshops were also open to the general public of any age, although the housing was reserved for young people.

== Kinky Friedman and Chris Bell ==
TSADP played an important role in getting support for the innocence commission bill by the Democratic nominee Chris Bell and a moratorium on executions by Texas musician, writer, and unsuccessful independent Gubernatorial candidate Kinky Friedman. During a meeting with TSADP members, Friedman said that his main concern was to focus and to be "Damn sure we won't execute the wrong guy". Friedman went so far as to state he would find an alternative to Texas' "Eject 'em or inject 'em" policy on death row legislature.
