= Forensic hypnosis =

Use of hypnosis in court proceedings

Forensic hypnosis is the use of hypnosis in the investigative process and as evidence in court which became increasingly popular from the 1950s to the early 1980s with its use being debated into the 1990s when its popular use mostly diminished. Forensic hypnosis's uses are hindered by concerns with its reliability and accuracy. The United States Department of Justice states that hypnosis may be occasionally used in investigation, but that the method faces "serious objections" and that information from hypnosis may be considered inadmissible. Forensic hypnosis has been considered for several uses including: hypnotic memory enhancement, evaluating a defendant's mental state, determining if a subject is telling the truth, preparing a witness for trial, determining if one is feigning trauma or a mental injury, and supporting the defense in a criminal case. Some of these uses have found more support than others as academic psychologists have reviewed these. While psychologists may find it appropriate to use memory enhancement to help in finding leads in the investigation process which should lead to uncovering more concrete evidence, its use in determining if a subject is telling the truth has been widely criticized.

The historical use of forensic hypnosis was catalyzed by analogies made between emerging recording technologies and forensic hypnosis techniques such as hypnotic age regression, a technique that supposedly reveals a hypnotized person's experiences and feelings at a certain point in the past. While this comparison was popular with the public, it caused concern for academic psychologists who went on to research hypnosis and attempt to determine its appropriate uses in law enforcement and whether the mind was analogous to a recording device.

== History ==
=== Period of inadmissibility ===
Attempts to admit forensic hypnosis in court were made before World War I and hypnotherapy gained popularity from its uses in treating soldier's trauma in World War II; however, it would not be admitted as evidence until the second half of the 20th century. One of the most referenced rules in determining the admissibility of forensic hypnosis as evidence is the Frye Standard (1923). Frye set the precedent that scientific methods and theories must gain general acceptance to be considered admissible as evidence in court and concerned the use of systolic blood pressure for lie detection, another type of forensic evidence. Prior to State v. Harding in 1968, courts looked at hypnotic testimonies skeptically and often declared that its use had not gained general acceptance, citing the Frye Standard. An example of this stance can be seen in State v. Pusch (1951). August Pusch was accused of poisoning his wife and charged with first-degree murder. A doctor trained in hypnosis who claimed that he could tell when one of his patients was lying, hypnotized Pusch. The recordings and doctor's testimony were both deemed inadmissible under the Frye Standard. The court compared forensic hypnosis to the polygraph test stating that they could both be used in criminal investigation but were not admissible in court.

An additional issue with the admission of forensic hypnosis is that when admitted it would have the status of a witness testimony which the jury would be asked to evaluate. This poses a risk since practitioners and lay supporters of forensic hypnosis claim forensic testimonies to be the unmediated record of events making it difficult for juries to properly evaluate testimonies and leading judges to declare forensic hypnosis inadmissible. This highlights another similarity of forensic hypnosis to the polygraph test as it is difficult for the jury to evaluate the truth value of such evidence. William J. Brian, a psychiatrist who used hypnosis in WW II and an early supporter of forensic hypnosis, offered to evaluate the state of mind of Henry Adolf Busch, an accused serial killer in 1957. Bryan portrayed hypnosis and memory like a recording device in an analogous way to the popular novel The Manchurian Candidate by Richard Condon and claimed that through using hypnosis he discovered that Busch had not been mentally in control of his actions. The jury was not convinced by his argument, but Bryan's push for the use of forensic hypnosis and appeal to popular culture brought forensic hypnosis one step closer to admissibility.

=== Admissibility and challenges ===
The general rule of inadmissibility which courts followed came to an end with State v. Harding (1968). In this case, Mildred Coley, who was raped and left wounded on the side of a road could not recall the events of the attack, but she was able to rehearse a detailed account of the events and identify her witness after a psychiatrist put her into a state of hypnosis. Declaring that forensic hypnosis satisfied the Frye Standard by gaining acceptance in the appropriate psychological fields and practices, the court called Coley as a witness to repeat what hypnosis allowed her to recall under the condition that the jurors give less weight to her hypnotic testimony. However, this was a landmark case for forensic hypnosis and the possibility that forensic hypnosis could be admitted as evidence in future cases led to a great expansion of the public's interest in forensic hypnosis and the method's use, especially in pre-trial work. An example of the method's expanding use is shown in the founding of hypnosis training institutes such as Martin Reiser's Law Enforcement Hypnosis Institution in Los Angeles which trained thousands of police in the 1970s. With the expanded use of forensic hypnosis came claims about the technique's truth-telling capabilities, particularly in popular scientific journals which influenced how the public viewed its dependability.

As a movement developed around support for forensic hypnosis, academic psychologists who were skeptical about the legitimacy of hypnosis's use in court increasingly challenged the admissibility of hypnotic testimonies. Academic psychologist's interest in challenging some of the popular beliefs surrounding hypnosis and memory led to a general increase in psychological experimentation and new procedures for analysis of these experiments. Psychologists studied how hypnosis makes people more susceptible to suggestion to determine if this suggestibility created a risk for the practitioner to influence what they are, perhaps unintentionally, looking for in the subject. Among the psychologists looking to challenge forensic hypnosis's use in the late 1970s was Martin Theodore Orne. Orne concluded in 1979 that while memory could be improved through hypnosis, using the tool also risked the hypnotist introducing outside information and distorting the memory. While popular culture and scientific journals began to hail forensic hypnosis as a method for recovering faultless memories which were stored inside of our minds, psychologists developed counterclaims and a different perspective on how memory and the mind worked under hypnosis.

Forensic Hypnosis faced a series of serious legal challenges in the 1980s with People v. Shirley (1982) standing out as a case which directly attacked the method's reliability. People v. Shirley was a California rape case where the supposed victim Catherine Crump went to the police while intoxicated and vaguely reported a rape. Mr. Farnell, a hypnotist without a formal psychology background, assisted her in retrieving a detailed story from her memory in which she woke in her apartment to find the defendant yielding a large knife and forcing her to have sex with him. However, there were multiple inconsistencies in the story she produced through hypnosis and what she had previously reported leading the court to declare her testimony inadmissible. The court declared witnesses could not testify if they had used forensic hypnosis as it could alter existing memories in unpredictable ways. However, while this may have been a success for the scientific opposition to the use of forensic hypnosis as evidence, this case would not mark the end of forensic hypnosis's use. In Rock v. Arkansas (1987), Mrs. Rock had been in a fight with her husband when the gun in her hand fired, killing her husband. While she could not initially remember the details of the incident, through hypnosis she claimed to remember that the gun misfired when her husband grabbed her arm. The lower court and Arkansas supreme court corroborated the decision in People v. Shirley regarding hypnotic testimonies; however, the Supreme Court overturned these decisions declaring that a total ban on hypnotic testimonies was unconstitutional and in violation of Mrs. Rock's right to due process (14th amendment) and right to call a witness (6th amendment).

=== The memory wars ===
The United States saw another major increase in the use of forensic hypnosis and its use in courts during the memory wars which took place in the 1980s and 1990s. Young adults in the 1980s, often ones who had used hypnotic therapy services, suddenly began recalling memories of childhood sexual abuse, satanic ritual abuse, and even alien abductions. The spike in appearance of these, often false, memories has been attributed to the popular culture and practitioner supported belief that hypnosis could reveal traumatic memories buried within one's mind. A network of therapists and support groups developed around this trend in the late 1980s. One of the greatest contributors to this trend was that the job of therapists is to comfort their patients and encourage them to confront their abuser; however, this does not allow for the rigorous fact-checking of evidence which courts require. An example of these cases can be seen in Borawick v. Shay (1995) where Borawick accused her aunt of multiple instances of childhood sexual assault after recalling the incident months after undergoing hypnotic age regression. The hypnotist, practicing in California, was not licensed as a psychologist and did not have a medical degree. The court determined that the hypnotic testimony was not admissible as there was no corroborative evidence to support Borawick's memories. The rejection of Borawick's testimony may be a consequence of the creation of the False Memory Syndrome Foundation (FMSF) by Peter J. Freyd to support parents, like himself, who were accused of childhood abuse based on returning memories.

The FMSF created a scientific board which was looking to disprove the legitimacy of claims made from hypnotically recovered memories. Elizabeth Loftus, a psychologist and expert on memory, was invited by Orne to join the board to work together on researching false memory. Loftus had previously done experiments which led her to conclude that the fundamental understanding of memory by the supporters of forensic hypnosis as a type of recording device was incorrect. In one experiment she showed subjects films of a traffic accident and later questioned them on what had occurred. When subjects repeated the events there were often errors, and suggestive questioning, as used in hypnosis, often led people to change how they remembered the events. Loftus and other experts testified to the unreliability of memory; however, this created a conflict with the traditional way in which the jury evaluates the credibility of a testimony as the expert is completely discrediting the witness's statement on a scientific basis that the jury does not understand. Nevertheless, this board continued to fight back against false memory throughout the memory wars, and while not unconstitutional, the use of forensic hypnosis has fallen out of heavy use since the 1990s.

== Uses of hypnosis ==
=== Pretrial work ===
There are several issues which arise when a witness undergoes hypnosis before a trial and then potentially uses information from that hypnotic session in their testimony. Subjects are more susceptible to changing how they remember events during hypnosis and from suggestive questioning, nonverbal cuing, and mixing reality with fantasy. Truth seeking methods such as cross examination tends to be less effective after a witness has undergone hypnosis which may lead to them acquiring false beliefs or false confidence in their memories. Similarly, subjects of hypnosis may gain self-assurance while in the relaxed state of hypnosis which may make it easier for them to lie, reshaping their future testimony. Ultimately, the use of hypnosis in pretrial work faces issues with how the accuracy of the future trial may be impacted and is thus discouraged today.

=== Criminal investigation ===
One of the least controversial uses for hypnosis is as a tool to find independent evidence to assist in an investigation. In order for this use of forensic hypnosis to not face the same challenges as hypnotic testimonies, there needs to be certainty that the subject being hypnotized will not need to later testify as a witness. Additionally, everything that the subject says while in a hypnotic trance must be verified or disproved with independent evidence and must not be conceived as factual. This is the case because it is easy for a subject to lie or make mistakes about their memory of an event while in a hypnotic trance. Investigative hypnosis has been proven useful to some police departments including the Los Angeles Police Department which reported in 1980 that in 70 cases where forensic hypnosis was used, it helped the police find important information in 54 of the cases. While this process is known to produce inaccuracies, it has also been shown to help police find leads to other evidence which warrants the cost of verifying or disproving information. This is the only use of forensic hypnosis which the US Department of Justice advises using, and still only in limited cases.

=== Evaluating state of mind ===
Another less controversial use for hypnosis is in evaluating an individual's state of mind. The American Medical Association and the American Psychological Association both consider using forensic hypnosis to assist in determining a subject's sanity or criminal intent to be legitimate. This may be used by the defendant to argue that insanity was what led the defendant to commit the crime and not their criminal intent as they could not control their own actions.

== See also ==
- Trial and Conviction of Charles Flores
