= Capital punishment in Texas =

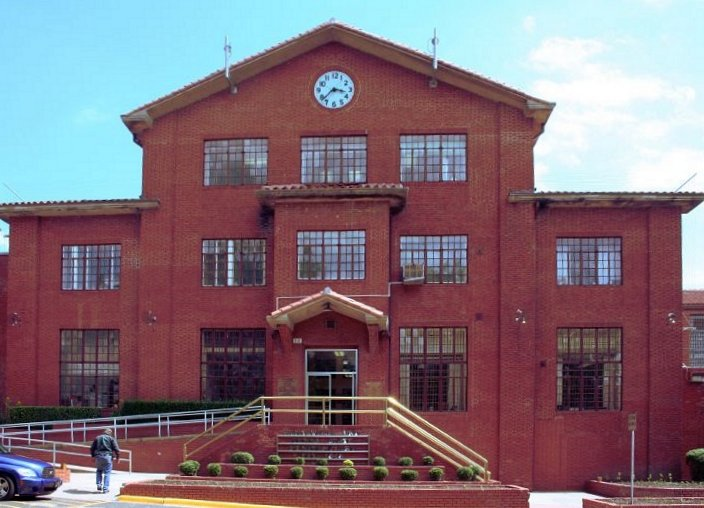
Huntsville Unit, where state executions take place

Capital punishment is a legal penalty in the U.S. state of Texas, for capital murder, and participation in a felony resulting in death if committed by an individual who is at least 18 years old.

In 1982, the state became the first jurisdiction in the world to carry out an execution by lethal injection, when it executed Charles Brooks Jr. It was the first execution in the state since 1964.

Texas, which is the second most populous state in the United States, has executed 605 people since the U.S. capital punishment resumption in 1976 (beginning in 1982 with the Brooks execution) to November 19, 2026 (the execution of Reinaldo Dennes)—more than a third of the national total. Even per capita, Texas has the nation's second-highest execution rate, behind only neighboring Oklahoma.

== History ==
The first execution in Texas occurred in 1819, with the execution of a white male, George Brown, for piracy. In 1840, a free black male, Henry Forbes, was executed for burglary and jail-breaking. Prior to Texas statehood in 1846, eight executions—all by hanging—were carried out.

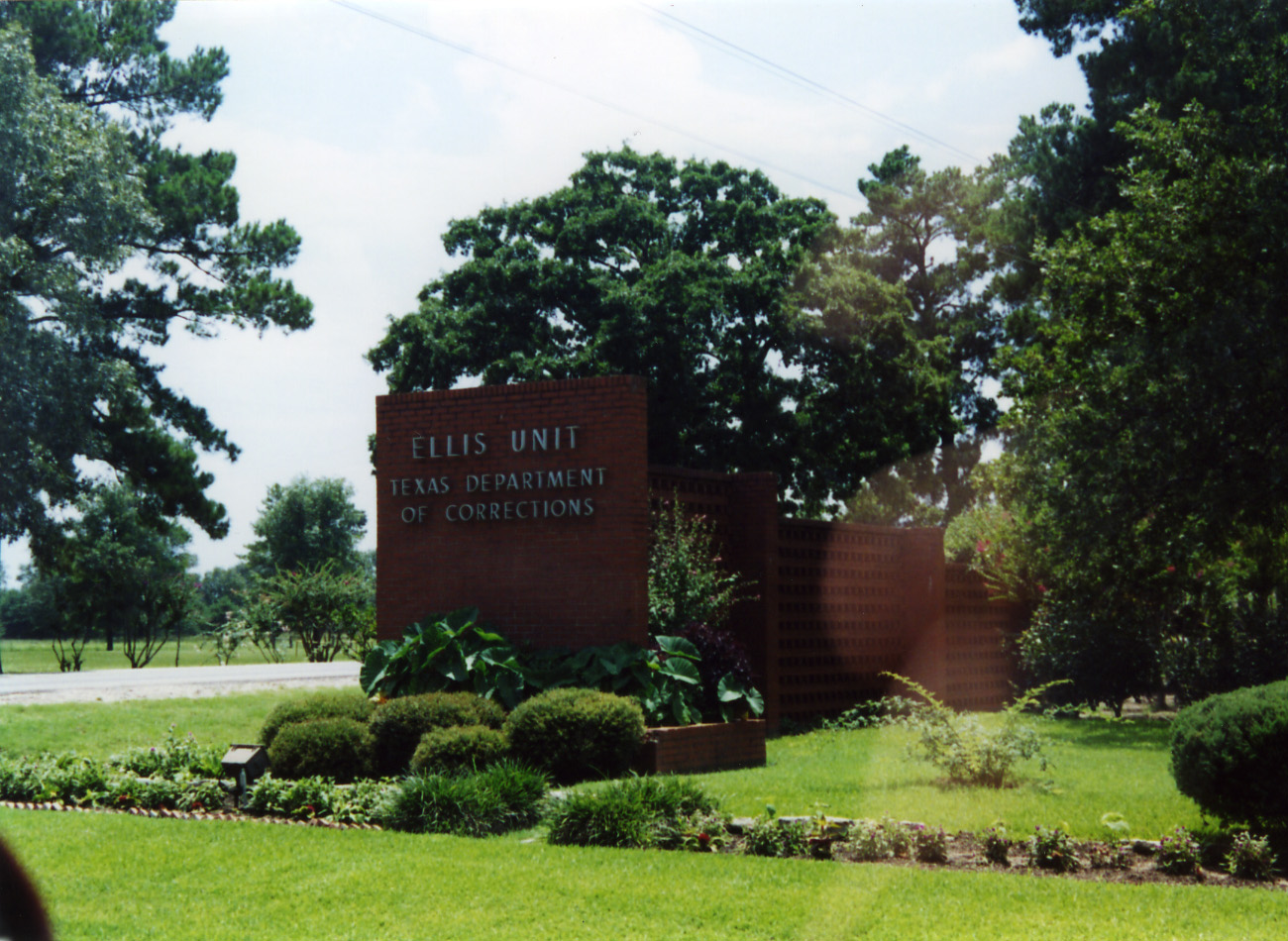
Ellis Unit, which at one time housed the State of Texas male death row

Upon statehood, hanging was the method used for almost all executions until 1924. Hangings were administered by the county where the trial took place. The last hanging in the state was that of Nathan Lee, a man convicted of murder and executed in Angleton, Brazoria County, Texas on August 31, 1923. The only other method used at the time was execution by firing squad, which was used for three Confederate deserters during the American Civil War, as well as a man convicted of attempted rape in 1863. In 1853, the first execution in Houston took place in public at Founder's Cemetery in the Fourth Ward; initially, the cemetery was the execution site, but post-1868 executions took place in the jail facilities.

In 1923, Texas changed its execution laws, which required that executions be carried out on the electric chair, and that they take place at the Texas State Penitentiary at Huntsville (also known as Huntsville Unit). From 1928 until 1965, this was also home to the state's male death row. The first executions on the electric chair were on February 8, 1924, when Charles Reynolds, Ewell Morris, Harris Washington, Haden Cochran, and Melvin Johnson had their death sentences carried out. The five executions were the most carried out on a single day in the state. The state would conduct multiple executions on a single day on several other occasions, the last being on August 9, 2000. Since then, the state has not executed more than one person on a single day, although there are no laws prohibiting it. A total of 361 people were executed by the electric chair in Texas, with the last being Joseph Johnson on July 30, 1964.

The United States Supreme Court decision in Furman v. Georgia (408 U.S. 238 (1972)), which declared Georgia's "unitary trial" procedure (in which the jury was asked to return a verdict of guilt or innocence and, simultaneously, determine whether the defendant would be punished by death or life imprisonment) to be unconstitutional, on the grounds that it was a cruel and unusual punishment in violation of the Eighth Amendment to the United States Constitution, essentially negated all death penalty sentences nationwide.

As result of the Furman decision, the 52 Texas death-row inmates at the time had all of their sentences reduced to life imprisonment. Among them was Kenneth McDuff, who was originally condemned for the murder of three teenagers in 1966. He was paroled in 1989, but subsequently executed in 1998 for a murder he committed while on parole, and is suspected to have been responsible for many other killings.

Furman led to a 1973 revision of the laws, primarily by introducing the bifurcated trial process (where the guilt-innocence and punishment phases are separate), and narrowly limited the legal definition of capital murder (and, thus, those offenses for which the death penalty could be imposed). The first person sentenced to death under the new Texas statute was John Devries on February 15, 1974; Devries hanged himself in his cell on July 1, 1974 (using bedsheets from his bunk), before he could be executed.

In 1976, the Supreme Court decision in Jurek v. Texas once again allowed for the death penalty to be imposed. (Jurek was a companion case in the Gregg decision, and was upheld by the Court; the Court stated that Texas' death penalty scheme could potentially result in fewer death penalty cases, an irony given that post-Gregg Texas has by far executed more inmates than any other state.) However, the first execution in Texas after this decision would not take place until December 7, 1982, with that of Charles Brooks, Jr. Brooks was also the first person to be judicially executed by lethal injection in the world.

In the post-Gregg era, Texas has executed 604 people, making it the state with the highest number of executions.Among the top five states with the highest number of executions, Texas surpasses the combined total of the next four states. There are a variety of proposed legal and cultural explanations as to why Texas has more executions than any other state. One possible reason is due to the federal appellate structure—federal appeals from Texas are made to the United States Court of Appeals for the Fifth Circuit. Michael Sharlot, dean of the University of Texas at Austin Law School, found the Fifth Circuit to be a “much more conservative circuit” than the Ninth Circuit, to which federal appeals from California are made. According to him, the Fifth is “more deferential to the popular will” that is strongly pro-death penalty, and creates few legal obstacles to execution within its jurisdiction. As of 2004, however, Texas may have a lower rate of death sentencing than other states, according to a study by Cornell University.

Texas has executed nine women in its history, the most recent being Lisa Ann Coleman on September 17, 2014.

In 2005, the state of Texas passed a law allowing life imprisonment without parole as an option for capital cases. Maurice Chammah, author of Let the Lord Sort Them: The Rise and Fall of the Death Penalty, stated that governments of smaller counties supported the move, as death penalty cases had increasing costs due to lengthy appeals processes. By 2021, the usage of the death penalty in Texas courts was on the decline. Rose Calahan of Texas Monthly stated that by that year, the death penalty became less of a wedge issue in politics. There were three executions in 2020, the smallest number of executions per year since 1996, which also had 3. In 2020, two persons were sentenced to death, making it the post-1974 year with the lowest number of people sentenced to death.

During the governorship of Rick Perry (2000-2015) Texas saw a record of 279 executions.

== Capital crimes ==
Under Texas statutes, a murder is capital if the offender:

1. Murders a peace officer or fireman who is acting in the lawful discharge of an official duty, and who the person knows is a peace officer or fireman. (There have been bills proposed to add EMT/paramedics to this list.)
2. Intentionally commits the murder in the course of committing or attempting to commit aggravated kidnapping, burglary, robbery, aggravated sexual assault, arson, obstruction or retaliation, or terroristic threat.
3. Commits the murder for remuneration or the promise of remuneration, or employs another to commit the murder for remuneration or the promise of remuneration.
4. Commits the murder while escaping or attempting to escape from a penal institution.
5. Commits the murder, while incarcerated, of a person who is employed in the operation of the penal institution.
6. Commits the murder, while incarcerated, with the intent to establish, maintain, or participate in a combination or in the profits of a combination, with a "combination" defined as "five or more persons who collaborate in carrying on criminal activities."
7. Commits the murder while incarcerated for murder; or while serving a sentence of life imprisonment or a term of 99 years for aggravated kidnapping, aggravated sexual assault, or aggravated robbery.
8. Murders more than one person during the same criminal transaction or during different criminal transactions, but the murders are committed pursuant to the same scheme or course of conduct.
9. Murders an individual under 15 years of age.
10. Murders another person in retaliation for or on account of the service or status of the other person as a judge or justice of the supreme court, the court of criminal appeals, a court of appeals, a district court, a criminal district court, a constitutional county court, a statutory county court, a justice court, or a municipal court.

Texas statute books still provide the death penalty for aggravated sexual assault committed by an offender previously convicted of the same against a child under 14.

In 1943, Texas established a minimum age of 17 for a defendant to be sentenced to death. The last people to be executed for a crime committed while under the age of 17 in Texas were brothers Roscoe and Henderson Young, ages 17 and 15, who were executed on May 6, 1938, for the rape and robbery of a couple. At the time of the crime, Roscoe was 16 and Henderson was 15. In 2005, the US Supreme Court in Roper v. Simmons has ruled capital punishment to be unconstitutional for all juvenile offenders, raising the minimum execution age to 18.

In 2011, the highest age of a child murder victim, which can subject the murderer to the death penalty, was raised from six to ten by the Texas legislature. Under Lauren's Law, this age was raised to 15; however, the death penalty cannot be sought if the basis of the capital murder charge was the death of an individual older than 10 but younger than 15.

== Demographics since 1982 ==
Race
White	265	44%
Black	219	36%
Hispanic	116	19%
Asian	3	0%
Native American	2	0%
Age
20–29	57	9%
30–39	259	43%
40–49	186	31%
50–59	80	13%
60–69	20	3%
70–79	3	0%
Sex
Male	599	99%
Female	6	1%
Date of execution
1980–1989	33	5%
1990–1999	166	27%
2000–2009	248	41%
2010–2019	120	20%
2020–2029	38	6%
Method
Lethal injection	605	100%
Top 10 counties of conviction
Harris	137	23%
Dallas	67	11%
Tarrant	49	8%
Bexar	47	8%
Montgomery	17	3%
Nueces	16	3%
Jefferson	15	2%
Smith	14	2%
Brazos	12	2%
Lubbock	11	2%
Potter	11	2%
Governor (Party)
Bill Clements (R)	18	3%
Mark White (D)	19	3%
Ann Richards (D)	49	8%
George W. Bush (R)	153	25%
Rick Perry (R)	279	46%
Greg Abbott (R)	87	14%
Total	605	100%

== Legal procedure ==
The prosecution may choose not to seek the death penalty. This can be for various reasons, such as the prosecution believing that they could not show the defendant worthy of death, or the family of the victim requesting that the death penalty not be imposed. Additionally, the death penalty cannot be sought at all on a capital murder charge if the aggravating factor was a single victim that was older than 10 but younger than 15.

=== Trial phase ===
When the prosecution seeks the death penalty, the sentence is decided by the jury. A death sentence must be unanimous, while a life sentence requires only 10 votes.

In case of a hung jury during the penalty phase of the trial, a life sentence is issued—even if only a single juror opposed death (there is no retrial).

Jurors in the sentencing phase are first asked to determine whether the defendant represents a “future danger to society.” Only after ruling that “there is a probability that the defendant would commit criminal acts of violence that would constitute a continuing threat to society,” will the jury choose the sentence itself, by deciding whether there is “sufficient mitigating circumstance or circumstances to warrant that a sentence of life imprisonment without parole rather than a death sentence be imposed” or not.

=== Appeals ===
The imposition of a death sentence in Texas results in an automatic direct appeal to the Texas Court of Criminal Appeals, the state's court of last resort for criminal cases (the intermediate Texas Courts of Appeals are bypassed). A person convicted of capital murder may also challenge their convictions or sentences via writs of habeas corpus at both the state and federal levels.

Texas's appeal process has been criticized as too lengthy compared to other states, such as Virginia, by death penalty supporters. In 2016, the legal director for the Criminal Justice Legal Foundation, Kent Scheidegger, asserted: “In Texas, part of the problem is some cases go back for a second review to the trial court, and some trial courts just sit on them for years. That simply shouldn't be allowed.”

=== Clemency ===
In addition to seeking judicial review of the sentence, a defendant may also appeal to the Texas Board of Pardons and Paroles, a separate agency from the Texas Department of Criminal Justice (TDCJ), for commutation of the sentence to life in prison. Clemency is asking for a reduction in sentence or to be set free. In capital cases with approval from the legislature, the governor may grant reprieves, commutations of punishment and pardons in cases of treason.

The Board, after hearing testimony, decides whether or not to recommend commutation to the governor of Texas. If the Board recommends commutation, the governor can accept or reject the recommendation. However, if the board does not recommend commutation, the governor has no power to override the Board's non-recommendation (the law was changed in 1936, due to concerns that pardons were being sold for cash under the administrations of former governor James E. Ferguson, and later his wife and Texas's first female governor, Miriam A. Ferguson).

The only unilateral action which the governor can take is to grant a one-time, 30-day reprieve to the defendant, and can do so regardless of what the Board recommends in a particular case.

Since Texas reinstated the death penalty in 1976, only three defendants who were sentenced to death have been granted clemency by the governor after a recommendation from the Board:

- Henry Lee Lucas in 1998 by George W. Bush.
- Kenneth Foster in 2007 by Rick Perry.
- Thomas Bartlett Whitaker in 2018 by Greg Abbott.

== Death row ==
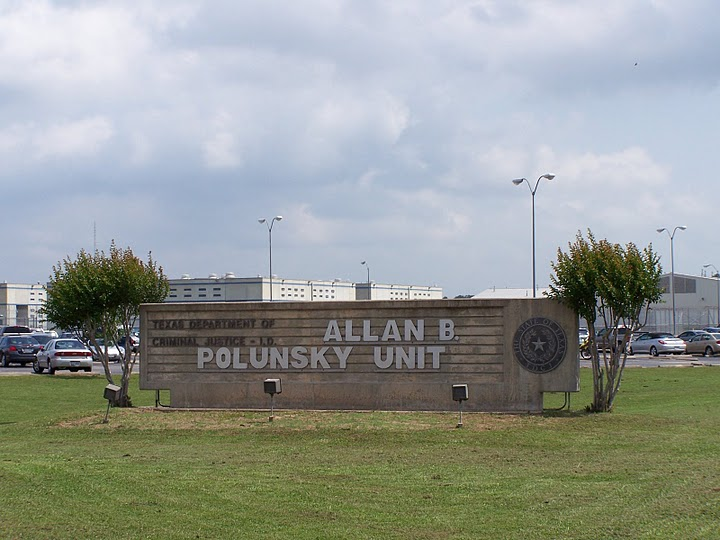
Polunsky Unit, which has the men's death row.

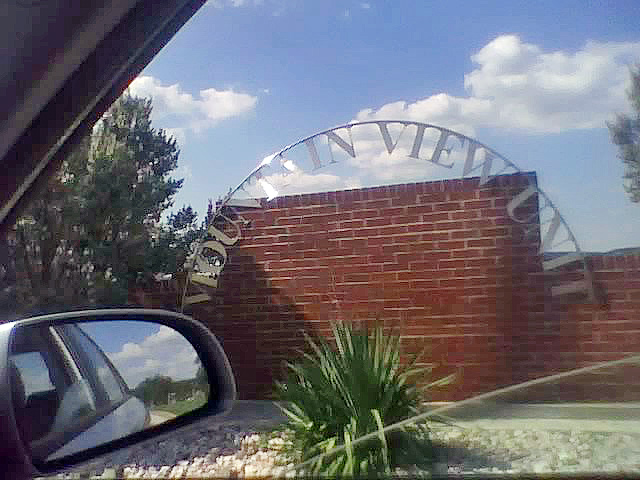
Mountain View Unit, which has the women's death row.

Male death row inmates are housed at the Polunsky Unit in West Livingston; female death row inmates are housed at the Patrick L. O'Daniel Unit in Gatesville. As of 2015 some death row inmates are at the Wayne Scott Unit (formerly Jester IV Unit) to receive psychiatric treatment.

All death row inmates at the Polunsky and O'Daniel units are physically segregated from the general population, are housed in individual cells approximately 60 square feet (5.6 m^{2}) in size, and engage in recreational activities in a cage individually, separate from the general population and other death row inmates. Photographs taken inside the men's death row were provided by the State of Texas in response to a Texas Freedom of Information Act request filed by attorney Yolanda Torres in 2009. Death row inmates receive special death row ID numbers starting with 999 instead of regular TDCJ numbers.

Death row prisoners, along with prisoners in administrative segregation, are seated individually on prison transport vehicles. The TDCJ makes death row prisoners wear various restraints, including belly chains and leg irons, while being transported. Death row offenders and offenders with life imprisonment without parole enter the TDCJ system through two points; men enter through the Byrd Unit in Huntsville, and women enter through the Reception Center in Christina Crain Unit, Gatesville. From there, death row inmates go to their designated death row facilities.

Previously, male death row inmates were permitted to work. In 1998 seven inmates attempted escape, with Martin Gurule succeeding. The prison work program was eliminated in response. In 2024, a new program allowed a limited number of men on death row to test relaxed confinement, allowing more interaction between them.

In 1928, the state of Texas began housing death row inmates in the Huntsville Unit. In 1965, the male death row inmates moved to the Ellis Unit. In 1999, the male death row moved to Polunsky. In the 1923–1973 period, Texas state authorities had three female death row inmates; the first, Emma "Straight Eight" Oliver, was held at Huntsville Unit after her 1949 sentencing, but had her sentence commuted to life imprisonment in 1951. Mary Anderson, sentenced to death in 1978, was held at Goree Unit. Her death sentence was reversed in 1982, and the sentence was changed to life.

== Execution procedure ==
The TDCJ website maintains a list of inmates with scheduled execution dates, which is generally updated within 1–2 days after an execution date is set, an execution takes place, or a stay of execution is granted and the date withdrawn.

=== Date of execution ===
The judge presiding over a capital case sets the execution date once it appears that all the offender's appeals have been exhausted. The initial date of execution cannot be prior to the 91st day after the day the order is entered, and (if the original order is withdrawn) subsequent execution dates cannot be less than the 31st day after the order is entered, provided that no habeas corpus motion has been filed under Article 11.071 of the Code of Criminal Procedure; otherwise, the date cannot be set prior to the court either denying relief, or issuing its mandate. In the event an offender manages to escape confinement, and not be re-arrested until after the set execution date, the revised date of execution shall be not less than 30 days from the date the order is issued.

=== Execution day ===
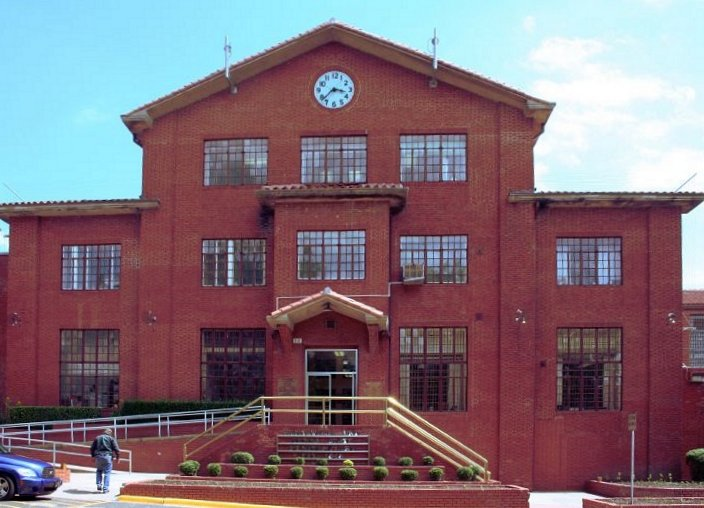
Huntsville Unit, where state executions take place

The law does not prohibit multiple executions in a single day; however, Texas has not executed multiple offenders on a single day since August 9, 2000, on which two offenders were executed.

The law only specifies that “The execution shall take place at a location designated by the Texas Department of Corrections in a room arranged for that purpose.” However, since 1923, all executions have been carried out at the Huntsville Unit, the former location of death row.

On the afternoon of a prisoner's scheduled execution, the prisoner is transported directly from their death row unit to the Huntsville Unit. Men leave the Polunsky Unit in a three-vehicle convoy bound for the Huntsville Unit; women leave from the Mountain View Unit. The only individuals who are informed of the transportation arrangements are the wardens of the affected units. The TDCJ does not make an announcement regarding what routes are used.

Upon arrival at the Huntsville Unit, the condemned is led through a back gate, submits to a cavity search, then is placed in a holding cell adjacent to the execution chamber.

Before 2011, the condemned was given an opportunity to have a last meal based on what the unit's cafeteria could prepare from its stock. Robert Perkinson, author of Texas Tough: The Rise of America's Prison Empire, said in 2010 that most condemned prisoners ordered “standard American fare in heaping portions, the sorts of meals that recall a childhood Sunday.” Many female prisoners under the death sentence did not take a last meal. However, Lawrence Russell Brewer, a white supremacist gang member convicted for the high-profile hate crime dragging death of James Byrd Jr., ordered a large last meal, and did not eat it before his execution in September 2011. Brewer, in fact, was not the first death row inmate to lose his appetite after requesting a large feast as his final meal. Yet in response, John Whitmire, a member of the Texas legislature, asked the TDCJ to stop special meals. Whitmire stated to the press that Brewer's victim, Mr. Byrd, “didn't get to choose his last meal.” The TDCJ complied. Brian Price, a former prison chef, offered to personally cook and pay for any subsequent special last meal, since the TDCJ would not be paying for them anymore. However, Whitmire warned in a letter that he would seek formal state legislation when lawmakers next convened if the "last meal" tradition was not discontinued immediately. Afterwards, the TDCJ stopped serving special last meals, and will only allow execution chamber prisoners to have the same kind of meal served to regular prisoners. Many prisoners requested cigarettes (which were denied, as TDCJ has banned smoking in its facilities).

Under Texas law, executions are carried out at or after 6:00 p.m. Huntsville (Central) time “by intravenous injection of a substance or substances in a lethal quantity sufficient to cause death, and until such convict is dead.” The law does not specify the substance(s) to be used; previously, according to the TDCJ, the chemicals used for the lethal injection were the commonly used three-drug combination of (in order): sodium thiopental (a dose which sedates the offender, but not enough to kill outright), pancuronium bromide (a muscle relaxant which collapses the diaphragm and lungs), and potassium chloride (which stops the heartbeat). The offender is usually pronounced dead approximately seven minutes after start of the injection process. The cost for the three substances is $86.08 per offender. As a result of drug shortages, sodium thiopental was replaced by pentobarbital in 2011. Further shortages of this drug have pushed the cost of the drugs to approximately $1300 per offender. Still, further shortages of pancuronium bromide (and the expiration of the existing stock) forced the state into switching to a single-drug protocol, using solely pentobarbital.

The only persons legally allowed to be present (none of whom can be convicts) at the execution are:

- the executioner “and such persons as may be necessary to assist him in conducting the execution.”
- the Board of Directors of the Department of Corrections.
- two physicians, including the prison physician.
- the spiritual advisor of the condemned.
- the chaplains of the Department of Corrections.
- the county judge and sheriff of the county in which the crime was committed.
- no more than five relatives or friends of the condemned person.

In response to victims rights groups, TDCJ adopted a board rule in January 1996, which allowed five victim witnesses (six for multiple victims). Initially, the witnesses were limited to immediate family and individuals with a close relationship to the victim, but the board rule was modified in 1998 to allow close friends of surviving witnesses. In May 2008, the rule was further modified to allow the victim witnesses to be accompanied by a spiritual advisor, who is a bona fide pastor, or comparable official of the victim's religion.

=== Media coverage ===
Five members of the media are also allowed to witness the execution, divided equally as possible between the rooms containing the offender's and victim's witnesses.

Under current TDCJ guidelines, representatives of the Associated Press and The Huntsville Item (the local newspaper for Huntsville, Texas) are guaranteed two of the five slots to witness an execution. The Associated Press regularly sends a representative to cover executions; Michael Graczyk (formerly of the AP's Houston office; though retired from the AP, he still reports on executions on a freelance basis) is usually the representative sent, having attended over 400 executions in his career. The Item also generally covers all executions, regardless of county of conviction.

Other media members must submit their requests at least three days prior to the execution date; priority will be given to media members representing the area in which the capital crime took place. Generally, other newspapers will only cover executions where the crime was committed within their general circulation area (the Houston Chronicle is often one of them, with Harris County being the state's largest, and having the most number of inmates on death row), and even then will frequently rely on the AP report. College and university media are not permitted to be witnesses.

=== Post-execution ===
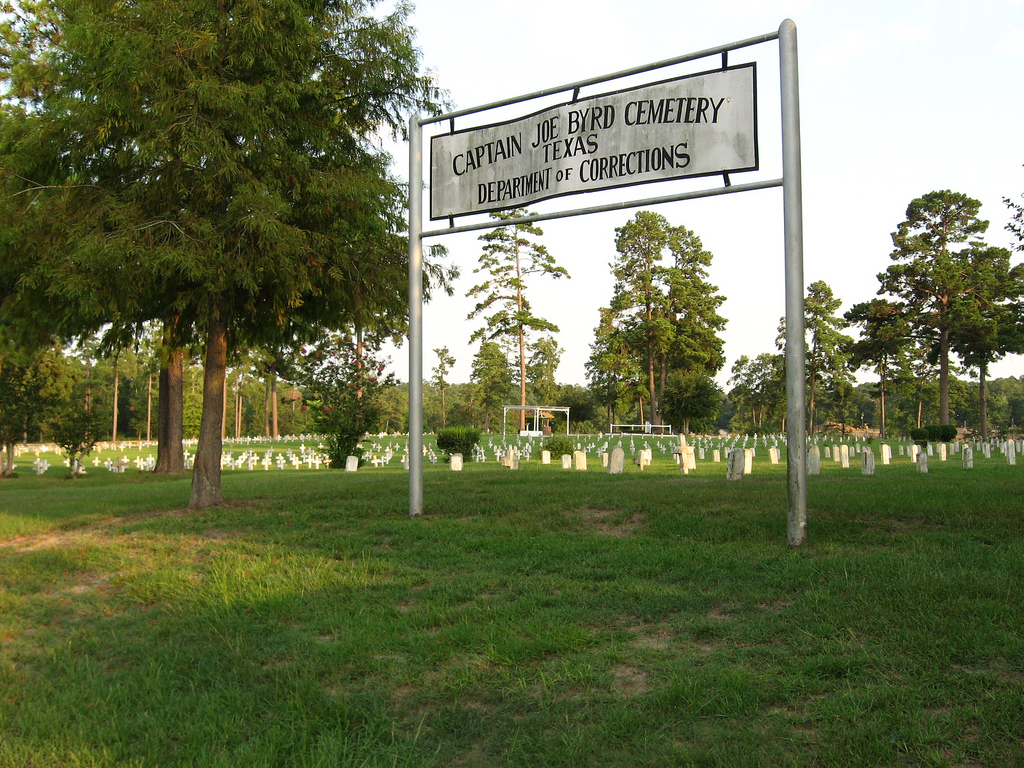
Captain Joe Byrd Cemetery in Huntsville, the Texas Department of Criminal Justice prison cemetery for deceased prisoners, including executed prisoners, who are not reclaimed by their families.

Upon the offender's death, the body shall be immediately embalmed, and shall be disposed of as follows:

- A relative or bona fide friend of the offender may demand or request the body within 48 hours after death, upon payment of a fee not to exceed US$25 for the mortician's services in embalming the deceased; once TDCJ receives the receipt, the body shall be released to the requestor or his/her authorized agent.
- If no relative or bona fide friend requests the body, the Anatomical Board of the State of Texas may request the body, but must also pay the US$25 fee for embalming services, and TDCJ must receive the receipt prior to delivery.
- If no relative, bona fide friend, or the Anatomical Board requests the body, TDCJ shall cause the body to be “decently buried,” with the embalming fee to be paid by the county in which the indictment resulting in the conviction occurred.

The TDCJ keeps an online record of all of its executions, including race, age, county of origin, and last words. The TDCJ is the only corrections agency in the US to extensively catalog the last words of executed inmates, and the only one to post the last words, other than the California Department of Corrections and Rehabilitation (CDCR).

The main TDCJ prison cemetery for prisoners not picked up by their families after death is the Captain Joe Byrd Cemetery in Huntsville. Headstones of death row prisoners have prison numbers with the beginning “999,” a state designation for a death row inmate, or they have the letters "EX" or "X."

Franklin T. "Frank" Wilson, an assistant professor of criminology at Indiana State University, and a former PhD student at Sam Houston State University, stated that about 2% of the people buried at the Byrd Cemetery had been executed, but the public believes that all executed prisoners are buried there because the Huntsville Unit, the site of execution in Texas, is in close proximity. Most executed prisoners are claimed by their families. While most prisoner funerals at Byrd Cemetery are held on Thursdays, in order to allow families of executed prisoners to make a single trip to Huntsville instead of two separate trips, the burial of an executed prisoner not claimed by the family is usually done the day after his or her execution.

== Opposition ==
The Texas Coalition to Abolish the Death Penalty, a 501(c)(3) grassroots membership organization, was founded in 1998. TCADP has members across the state of Texas working to educate their local communities on the problems of the Texas death penalty. TCADP hosts multiple educational and training opportunities each year around the state, including releasing an annual report on December 7, and a day-long annual conference, which includes workshops, panel discussions, networking, and awards. The conference is held in Austin during legislative years, and in other Texas Cities in non-legislative years (for example: the 2012 conference was held in San Antonio). In 2004, TCADP opened a state office in Austin with a paid program coordinator, and subsequently hired an executive director in 2008. TCADP is affiliated with the National Coalition to Abolish the Death Penalty.

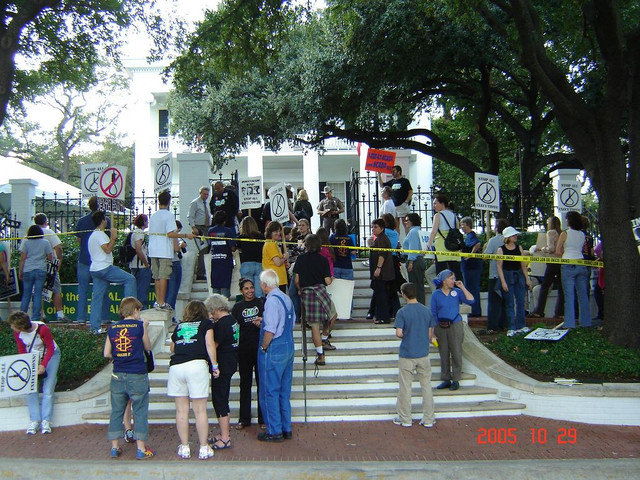
Protesters gather at the front gate of the Texas Governor's Mansion during the 6th Annual March to Stop Executions

The March to Abolish the Death Penalty is the current name of an event organized each October since 2000 by several Texas anti-death penalty organizations, including: Texas Moratorium Network; the Austin chapter of the Campaign to End the Death Penalty; the Texas Death Penalty Abolition Movement; and Texas Students Against the Death Penalty. Anti-Death Penalty Alternative Spring Break is an annual event started by the Texas Moratorium Network in 2004, and is now co-organized by Texas Students Against the Death Penalty. It serves as a training ground for students who oppose the death penalty.

Protests against the death penalty have continued to take place in concern for incarcerated individuals sentenced to death. In 2012, in order to raise awareness for the severity of the death penalty, multiple members of the church began to protest to voice their concern against what was believed to be a violation of human rights. Fortunately, this has been a growing improvement. Texas has begun to have a decline in the number of death sentences and is going in a positive direction compared to past numbers of death penalties.

The Death Row Inner-Communalist Vanguard Engagement (D.R.I.V.E.) consists of several male death row inmates from the Polunsky Unit. Through a variety of non-violent strategies, they have begun launching protests against the perceived bad conditions at Polunsky, in particular, and capital punishment, in general. They actively seek to consistently voice complaints to the administration, in order to organize grievance filing to address problems. They occupy day rooms, non-violently refuse to evacuate their cells, or initiate sit-ins in visiting rooms, hallways, pod runs, and recreation yards when there is the perception of an act of abuse of authority by guards (verbal abuse; physical abuse; meals/recreations or showers being wrongly denied; unsanitary day rooms and showers being allowed to persist; medical being denied; paper work being denied; refusing to contact higher rank to address the problems and complaints), and when alleged retaliation (thefts, denials, destruction of property; food restrictions; wrongful denials of visits; abuse of inmates) is carried out in response to their grievances.

In 2016, Pfizer and other drug manufacturers banned the use of their products for lethal injections. Texas and other states were reported to be finding it difficult to obtain supplies of drugs for executions.

== Execution of allegedly innocent persons ==
=== Cameron Todd Willingham ===
One notable case involves Cameron Todd Willingham, who was executed by lethal injection on February 17, 2004, for murdering his three daughters in 1991 by arson, but where a 2009 article in The New Yorker, and subsequent findings, have cast doubt on the evidence used in his conviction.

In 2009, a report conducted by Dr. Craig Beyler, hired by the Texas Forensic Science Commission to review the case, found that “a finding of arson could not be sustained.” Beyler claimed that key testimony from a fire marshal at Willingham's trial was “hardly consistent with a scientific mind-set, and [was] more characteristic of mystics or psychics.”

Governor Rick Perry expressed skepticism of Beyler's findings. He stated that court records showed evidence of Willingham's guilt in charges that he intentionally killed his daughters in the fire. Perry is quoted in the report remarking of Willingham, “I’m familiar with the latter-day supposed experts on the arson side of it,” and further asserted that court records provided “clear and compelling, overwhelming evidence that he was, in fact, the murderer of his children.” The Corsicana Fire Department also released a 19-page rebuttal of Beyler's report, which stated that the report overlooked several key points that would show Willingham to be guilty.

On July 23, 2010, the Texas Forensic Science Commission released a report which contended that the conviction was based on "flawed science," but that there was no indication that the arson authorities were negligent, or had committed willful misconduct.

=== Tommy Lee Walker ===
On the night of September 30, 1953, Venice Lorraine Parker, a white woman, was raped and murdered under a bridge near the Dallas Love Field. Testimony from a police officer indicated that Parker implicated a young black man in her murder shortly before she died, although other witnesses stated that Parker did not implicate any specific demographics and did not speak much before her death. On the night of January 29, Tommy Lee Walker, a 19-year-old black man, was arrested and charged with the murder. On January 30, he signed a written confession, in which he admitted to cutting Parker's throat while robbing her. Walker quickly recanted his confession.

At Walker's trial, two witnesses testified that they saw a black man at the scene of the murder just minutes before it was committed. However, there was no physical evidence linking Walker to the murder. In addition, Walker's underaged girlfriend, 14-year-old Mary Louise Smith, whom he impregnated when he was 18, testified that he was with her on the night of the murder since she was giving birth. Under state law, Walker would've been guilty of statutory rape, a capital offense at the time. Texas law defined statutory rape as a man having sex with a female under the age of fifteen years and not his wife. Eight other witnesses testified in support of this alibi, saying Walker, who lived five miles away and did not own a car, was with Smith that night. On March 29, 1954, Walker was convicted of murder and sentenced to death. After losing his appeal, he was executed on May 12, 1956. On January 21, 2026, Walker was posthumously exonerated by the Dallas County Commissioners Court; the decision is symbolic and not legally binding, but it acknowledges that Texas violated Walker's constitutional rights regarding his arrest, interrogation, and trial. The declaration ceremony was attended by Tommy Lee Walker's son and Venice Parker's son. The review happened with the help of the Innocence Project.

== See also ==
- Crime in Texas
- Law of Texas
