= Murder in Texas law =

Murder in Texas law constitutes the intentional killing, under circumstances defined by law, of people within or under the jurisdiction of the U.S. state of Texas.

The United States Centers for Disease Control and Prevention reported that in the year 2020, the state had a murder rate slightly above the median for the entire country.

== Felony murder rule ==
The felony murder rule in Texas, codified in Texas Penal Code § 19.02(b)(3), states that a person commits murder if he or she "commits or attempts to commit a felony, other than manslaughter, and in the course of and in furtherance of the commission or attempt, or in immediate flight from the commission or attempt, the person commits or attempts to commit an act clearly dangerous to human life that causes the death of an individual."

The felony murder rule is sometimes confused with the law of parties, which states that a person can be criminally responsible for the actions of another by aiding or abeting, or conspires with the principal.

== Penalties ==
Offense	Mandatory sentencing
Negligent homicide	6 months to 2 years in jail
Manslaughter	2 to 20 years in prison
Murder	5 to 99 years or life (Note: If the defendant can prove with a preponderance of the evidence that the murder occurred "under the immediate influence of sudden passion arising from an adequate cause," then the murder is a second degree felony (rather than first degree felony). The punishment range is reduced to between 2 and 20 years in prison.); Parole possible after 30 years or less (Note: For sentences of less than 60 years, parole is possible after half the sentence. For sentences of 60 years and over, parole is possible after 30 years.)
Capital murder	For adults: Death or life-without-parole For juveniles in adult court: Life with the possibility of parole after 40 years For juveniles in juvenile court: Maximum of 40 years in prison

== See also ==
- Capital punishment in Texas
- Common purpose
- Crime in Texas
- Judiciary of Texas
- Law of Texas
