= Michael Graczyk =

American journalist (born 1950)

- Born: 1950 (age 75–76)
- Occupations: Journalist, reporter
- Years active: 1984–Present

Michael Graczyk (born 1950) is an American journalist.

He was formerly based in the Houston bureau of the Associated Press. Graczyk officially retired from the AP at the end of July 2018, but continues covering executions and other news stories for the agency as a freelancer.

During his career, Graczyk reported on a wide range of topics. However, he is most notable as the AP's designated representative to witness executions in Texas. Since 1984, Graczyk has witnessed more than 450 executions, considered a macabre record for an American.
