= Let the Lord Sort Them =

Book written by Maurice Chammah

Let the Lord Sort Them: The Rise and Fall of the Death Penalty is a book written by Maurice Chammah.

== Background ==
The 368-page book was written by Maurice Chammah and published by Penguin Random House subsidiary Crown Publishing Group on January 26, 2021. Chammah is a staff writer for The Marshall Project. Chammah's first job was at the Texas After Violence Project. In the book, Chammah writes about the Texas Resource Center and Bryan Stevenson.

The book focuses on the death penalty in Texas. The book starts with Furman v. Georgia. The book covers the story of Wilbert Rideau. The book covers the death of Charles Brooks Jr.. The book covers the work of Craig Washington. The book also covers the work of Elsa Alcala.

Chammah, a staff writer for the Marshall Project, conceived the book as a history of the death penalty's rise and decline told through the lives of the people who carried it out and those condemned by it, rather than the abstract, culture-war fight he felt it had become. Much of the narrative is about Texas, whose continued use of the death penalty Chammah credits both to the way repeated executions make each one easier to carry out and to what he calls an "old frontier myth" that Texans invoked to defend it.

== Reception ==
Publishers Weekly called the book "thorough, finely written, and unflinching". Thomas Karel wrote in LibraryJournal that the book was a "well-documented legal history that will appeal to a broad audience." The book was an Earphones Award Winner.
