= Innocence commissions =

An innocence commission is a legal commission set up by a government for post-conviction review of cases, to try to ensure that wrongful convictions do not stand and that no innocent person is executed.

== History ==
In November 2002 Chief Justice I. Beverly Lake Jr. of the North Carolina State Supreme Court established the Criminal Justice Study Commission following several highly publicized exoneration cases in the state. It reviewed police and prosecution procedures for factors that contributed to wrongful convictions. The group recommended reforms, including changes to the procedure for gaining eyewitness testimony. This resulted in a change to state law.

As a result of recommendations of the Justice Study, in 2006 the North Carolina legislature passed a bill to establish a state independent Innocence Inquiry Commission, signed into law by Governor Mike Easley. It was the first U.S. state to do so. The Innocence Commission was developed to review credible post-conviction cases in which the defendants and their advocates claim wrongful conviction; it started operating in 2007 and has exonerated 10 people as of March 2017.

The commission was authorized after some high-profile convictions were overturned. These cases had generated considerable controversy and the exonerations were damaging to trust in the criminal justice system even before their convictions were overturned.

Although several states have created commissions to examine causes of and remedies for wrongful convictions., The North Carolina Innocence Inquiry Commission is the only one of its kind to date in the United States.

The law is modeled after one that established the Innocence Network of the United Kingdom.

== Process ==
=== North Carolina ===
Claimants can apply directly to the commission, and others may refer cases. If a claimant meets certain statutory criteria, including having new, credible, and verifiable evidence of factual innocence, commission staff will investigate the case and may present the case to The eight-member commission to determine whether there is sufficient evidence to have the case reviewed by a three-judge panel for a decision on exoneration.

== Appointment Process ==
=== North Carolina ===
The eight Commission members are appointed by the chief justice of the state Supreme Court and chief judge of the state Court of Appeals.

== Other solutions ==
- Creation of panels to review and improve legal process
