= Law of parties =

Texas criminal legislation

The Texas law of parties states that a person can be criminally responsible for the actions of another in certain circumstances, including "[i]f in the attempt to carry out a conspiracy to commit one felony, another felony is committed by one of the conspirators, all conspirators are guilty of the felony actually committed, though having no intent to commit it, if the offense was committed in furtherance of the unlawful purpose and was one that should have been anticipated as a result of the carrying out of the conspiracy."

In Texas capital cases, a person convicted under the law of parties may not be sentenced to death unless the sentencing jury finds beyond a reasonable doubt that "the defendant actually caused the death of the deceased or did not actually cause the death of the deceased but intended to kill the deceased or another or anticipated that a human life would be taken."

In 2021 and 2023, the Texas House of Representatives voted in favor of bills intended to limit death penalty eligibility under the law of parties, but neither of the bills advanced to the next stage.

== Convictions under the law ==
People sentenced to death under the law include Carlos Santana, Carlos Trevino, Cleve Foster, Clinton Young, Donald Newbury, Doyle Skillern, George Rivas, G.W. Green, Humberto Garza, Jeffery Wood, Jessie Gutierrez, John Adams, Joseph Garcia, Joseph Nichols, Juan Ramirez, Kenneth Foster, Michael Rodriguez, Miguel Martinez, Patrick Murphy, Randy Halprin, Ray Jasper, Robert Garza, Robert Pruett, Robert Thompson, Rodolfo Medrano, Steven Woods, Thomas Whitaker, Ignacio Cuevas, and Charles Don Flores.

Kenneth Foster, Miguel Martinez, and Thomas Whitaker's sentences would later be commuted to life imprisonment. Clinton Young was released on bond in 2022 after his conviction was overturned due to prosecutorial misconduct. He was retried and sentenced to life imprisonment in 2024.

== See also ==
- Collective punishment
- Felony murder rule (Texas)
- Lists of people executed in Texas
