= List of people executed in the United States in 2001 =

Sixty-six people, sixty-three male and three female, (Wanda Jean Allen, Marilyn Kay Plantz, and Lois Nadean Smith) were executed in the United States in 2001, all by lethal injection. The majority of executions carried out in 2001 were carried out in Oklahoma (18 executions) and Texas (17 executions). One notable execution, Timothy McVeigh, was a convicted domestic terrorist who was responsible for carrying out the Oklahoma City bombing in 1995. McVeigh's execution was the first to be carried out by the United States federal government since 1963. Only one execution occurred in September, as several were postponed due to the September 11 attacks. The attack on the Pentagon caused federal offices, including the United States Supreme Court, to shut down. The state of New Mexico carried out its last execution in 2001 before abolishing the death penalty in 2009.

== List of people executed in the United States in 2001 ==
| No. | Date of execution | Name | Age of person | | | Gender | Ethnicity | State | Method | Ref. |
| No. | Date of execution | Name | At execution | At offense | Age difference | Gender | Ethnicity | State | Method | Ref. |
|---|---|---|---|---|---|---|---|---|---|---|
| 1 | January 9, 2001 | Jack Wade Clark | 37 | 26 | 11 | Male | White | Texas | Lethal injection | |
| 2 | January 9, 2001 | Eddie Leroy Trice | 48 | 34 | 14 | Male | Black | Oklahoma | Lethal injection | |
| 3 | January 11, 2001 | Robert Dewey Glock II | 39 | 22 | 17 | Male | White | Florida | Lethal injection | |
| 4 | January 11, 2001 | Wanda Jean Allen | 41 | 29 | 12 | Female | Black | Oklahoma | Lethal injection | |
| 5 | January 16, 2001 | Floyd Allen Medlock | 30 | 20 | 10 | Male | White | Oklahoma | Lethal injection | |
| 6 | January 18, 2001 | Alvin Urial Goodwin III | 37 | 22 | 15 | Male | White | Texas | Lethal injection | |
| 7 | January 18, 2001 | Dion Athanasius Smallwood | 31 | 22 | 9 | Male | Hispanic | Oklahoma | Lethal injection | |
| 8 | January 23, 2001 | Mark Andrew Fowler | 35 | 20 | 15 | Male | White | Oklahoma | Lethal injection | |
| 9 | January 25, 2001 | Billy Ray Fox | 35 | 19 | 16 | Male | White | Oklahoma | Lethal injection | |
| 10 | January 29, 2001 | Caruthers "Gus" Alexander | 52 | 32 | 20 | Male | Black | Texas | Lethal injection | |
| 11 | January 30, 2001 | Loyd Winford Lafevers | 35 | 19 | 16 | Male | White | Oklahoma | Lethal injection | |
| 12 | February 1, 2001 | Dorsie Leslie "Wayne" Jones Jr. | 61 | 39 | 22 | Male | White | Oklahoma | Lethal injection | |
| 13 | February 7, 2001 | Stanley Dewaine Lingar | 37 | 21 | 16 | Male | White | Missouri | Lethal injection | |
| 14 | February 8, 2001 | Adolph Gil Hernandez | 50 | 38 | 12 | Male | Hispanic | Texas | Lethal injection | |
| 15 | March 1, 2001 | Thomas Wayne Akers | 31 | 29 | 2 | Male | White | Virginia | Lethal injection | |
| 16 | March 1, 2001 | Robert William Clayton | 40 | 24 | 16 | Male | White | Oklahoma | Lethal injection | |
| 17 | March 7, 2001 | Dennis Thurl Dowthitt | 55 | 44 | 11 | Male | White | Texas | Lethal injection | |
| 18 | March 9, 2001 | Willie Ervin Fisher | 39 | 30 | 9 | Male | Black | North Carolina | Lethal injection | |
| 19 | March 14, 2001 | Gerald Wayne Bivins | 41 | 31 | 10 | Male | White | Indiana | Lethal injection | |
| 20 | March 27, 2001 | Robert Lee Massie | 59 | 37 | 22 | Male | White | California | Lethal injection | |
| 21 | March 27, 2001 | Ronald Dunaway Fluke | 52 | 48 | 4 | Male | White | Oklahoma | Lethal injection | |
| 22 | March 28, 2001 | Tomas Grant Ervin | 50 | 37 | 13 | Male | White | Missouri | Lethal injection | |
| 23 | April 3, 2001 | Jason Eric Massey | 28 | 20 | 8 | Male | White | Texas | Lethal injection | |
| 24 | April 21, 2001 | Sebastian Stephanous Bridges | 37 | 34 | 3 | Male | White | Nevada | Lethal injection | |
| 25 | April 25, 2001 | Mose Young Jr. | 45 | 27 | 18 | Male | Black | Missouri | Lethal injection | |
| 26 | April 25, 2001 | David Lee Goff | 32 | 21 | 11 | Male | Black | Texas | Lethal injection | |
| 27 | April 26, 2001 | David F. Dawson | 46 | 31 | 15 | Male | White | Delaware | Lethal injection | |
| 28 | May 1, 2001 | Marilyn Kay Plantz | 40 | 27 | 13 | Female | White | Oklahoma | Lethal injection | |
| 29 | May 8, 2001 | Clay King Smith | 30 | 27 | 3 | Male | White | Arkansas | Lethal injection | |
| 30 | May 22, 2001 | Terrance Anthony James | 41 | 22 | 19 | Male | White | Oklahoma | Lethal injection | |
| 31 | May 23, 2001 | Samuel D. Smith | 40 | 26 | 14 | Male | Black | Missouri | Lethal injection | |
| 32 | May 25, 2001 | Abdullah Tanzil Hameen | 37 | 27 | 10 | Male | Black | Delaware | Lethal injection | |
| 33 | May 29, 2001 | Vincent Allen Johnson | 42 | 32 | 10 | Male | Black | Oklahoma | Lethal injection | |
| 34 | June 11, 2001 | Timothy James McVeigh | 33 | 26 | 7 | Male | White | Federal government | Lethal injection | |
| 35 | June 13, 2001 | John Leslie Wheat | 57 | 51 | 6 | Male | White | Texas | Lethal injection | |
| 36 | June 14, 2001 | Jay D. Scott | 48 | 30 | 18 | Male | Black | Ohio | Lethal injection | |
| 37 | June 19, 2001 | Juan Raul Garza | 44 | 33 | 11 | Male | Hispanic | Federal government | Lethal injection | |
| 38 | June 26, 2001 | Miguel Richardson | 46 | 24 | 22 | Male | Black | Texas | Lethal injection | |
| 39 | June 27, 2001 | James Lowery | 54 | 32 | 22 | Male | White | Indiana | Lethal injection | |
| 40 | July 11, 2001 | Jerome Mallett | 42 | 26 | 16 | Male | Black | Missouri | Lethal injection | |
| 41 | July 11, 2001 | James Joseph Wilkens Jr. | 39 | 25 | 14 | Male | White | Texas | Lethal injection | |
| 42 | July 17, 2001 | Jerald Wayne Harjo | 40 | 26 | 14 | Male | Native American | Oklahoma | Lethal injection | |
| 43 | August 8, 2001 | Mack Oran Hill | 47 | 33 | 14 | Male | White | Texas | Lethal injection | |
| 44 | August 16, 2001 | Jeffrey Carlton Doughtie | 39 | 31 | 8 | Male | White | Texas | Lethal injection | |
| 45 | August 24, 2001 | Clifton Allen White | 43 | 30 | 13 | Male | White | North Carolina | Lethal injection | |
| 46 | August 28, 2001 | James Homer Elledge | 58 | 55 | 3 | Male | White | Washington | Lethal injection | |
| 47 | August 28, 2001 | Jack Dale Walker | 35 | 22 | 13 | Male | White | Oklahoma | Lethal injection | |
| 48 | August 31, 2001 | Ronald Wayne Frye | 42 | 34 | 8 | Male | White | North Carolina | Lethal injection | |
| 49 | September 18, 2001 | James Roy Knox | 50 | 31 | 19 | Male | White | Texas | Lethal injection | |
| 50 | October 3, 2001 | Michael S. Roberts | 27 | 19 | 8 | Male | White | Missouri | Lethal injection | |
| 51 | October 12, 2001 | David Junior Ward | 39 | 29 | 10 | Male | Black | North Carolina | Lethal injection | |
| 52 | October 18, 2001 | Christopher James Beck | 26 | 20 | 6 | Male | White | Virginia | Lethal injection | |
| 53 | October 18, 2001 | Alvie James Hale Jr. | 53 | 35 | 18 | Male | White | Oklahoma | Lethal injection | |
| 54 | October 22, 2001 | Gerald Lee Mitchell | 33 | 17 | 16 | Male | Black | Texas | Lethal injection | |
| 55 | October 24, 2001 | Stephen K. Johns | 55 | 35 | 20 | Male | White | Missouri | Lethal injection | |
| 56 | October 25, 2001 | Terry Michael Mincey | 41 | 22 | 19 | Male | White | Georgia | Lethal injection | |
| 57 | November 6, 2001 | Jose Martinez High | 45 | 19 | 26 | Male | Black | Georgia | Lethal injection | |
| 58 | November 6, 2001 | Terry Douglas Clark | 45 | 30 | 15 | Male | White | New Mexico | Lethal injection | |
| 59 | November 14, 2001 | Jeffery Eugene Tucker | 41 | 28 | 13 | Male | White | Texas | Lethal injection | |
| 60 | November 15, 2001 | Fred Marion Gilreath Jr. | 63 | 41 | 22 | Male | White | Georgia | Lethal injection | |
| 61 | November 15, 2001 | Emerson Edward Rudd | 31 | 18 | 13 | Male | Black | Texas | Lethal injection | |
| 62 | November 30, 2001 | John Hardy Rose | 43 | 32 | 11 | Male | White | North Carolina | Lethal injection | |
| 63 | December 4, 2001 | Lois Nadean Smith | 61 | 41 | 20 | Female | White | Oklahoma | Lethal injection | |
| 64 | December 6, 2001 | Sahib Lateef Al-Mosawi | 53 | 44 | 9 | Male | Arab | Oklahoma | Lethal injection | |
| 65 | December 11, 2001 | Byron Ashley Parker | 41 | 23 | 18 | Male | White | Georgia | Lethal injection | |
| 66 | December 12, 2001 | Vincent Edward Cooks | 37 | 23 | 14 | Male | Black | Texas | Lethal injection | |
| | | Average: | 42 years | 29 years | 13 years | | | | | |

== Demographics ==
Gender
| Male | 63 | 95% |
| Female | 3 | 5% |
Ethnicity
| White | 44 | 67% |
| Black | 17 | 26% |
| Hispanic | 3 | 5% |
| Arab | 1 | 2% |
| Native American | 1 | 2% |
State
| Oklahoma | 18 | 27% |
| Texas | 17 | 26% |
| Missouri | 7 | 11% |
| North Carolina | 5 | 8% |
| Georgia | 4 | 6% |
| Delaware | 2 | 3% |
| Federal government | 2 | 3% |
| Indiana | 2 | 3% |
| Virginia | 2 | 3% |
| Arkansas | 1 | 2% |
| California | 1 | 2% |
| Florida | 1 | 2% |
| Nevada | 1 | 2% |
| New Mexico | 1 | 2% |
| Ohio | 1 | 2% |
| Washington | 1 | 2% |
Method
| Lethal injection | 66 | 100% |
Month
| January | 11 | 17% |
| February | 3 | 5% |
| March | 8 | 12% |
| April | 5 | 8% |
| May | 6 | 9% |
| June | 6 | 9% |
| July | 3 | 5% |
| August | 6 | 9% |
| September | 1 | 2% |
| October | 7 | 11% |
| November | 6 | 9% |
| December | 4 | 6% |
Age
| 20–29 | 3 | 5% |
| 30–39 | 23 | 35% |
| 40–49 | 24 | 36% |
| 50–59 | 13 | 20% |
| 60–69 | 3 | 5% |
| Total | 66 | 100% |

== Executions in recent years ==
Number of executions
| 2002 | 71 |
| 2001 | 66 |
| 2000 | 85 |
| Total | 222 |

== See also ==
- List of death row inmates in the United States
- List of most recent executions by jurisdiction
- List of people scheduled to be executed in the United States
- List of women executed in the United States since 1976

| Preceded by 2000 | List of people executed in the United States in 2001 | Succeeded by 2002 |
