= Santiago Garduno =

Executed American serial killer

- Born: December 28, 1884; Truchas, New Mexico, U.S.
- Died: July 21, 1933 (aged 48); Penitentiary of New Mexico, New Mexico, U.S.
- Status: Executed by electrocution
- Convictions: New Mexico; First degree murder Manslaughter; Colorado; Murder
- Penalty: Death

Details
- Victims: 3–4
- Span of crimes: 1900s–1932
- Country: United States
- States: New Mexico and Colorado

Santiago Garduno (December 28, 1884 – July 21, 1933) was an American serial killer who committed at least three murders in Colorado and New Mexico in the early 20th century. Garduno was sentenced to death for his final murder, and became one of the first two inmates to be executed by electric chair in New Mexico.

== Initial murders ==
Garduno served time for a murder committed in Colorado. He was allegedly charged with another murder, but that case did not go to trial after key witnesses against him died.

On January 1, 1925, several men, including Garduno, got into a fight at a dance party in Truchas, New Mexico. During the fight, Garduno pulled out a gun and fired several shots, killing a young man named Paulin Barela and wounding Paulin's brother. The Barela brothers had been members of the American Legion and were well respected in the community. Garduno was convicted of manslaughter and sentenced to 9 to 10 years in prison. He was paroled in 1930.

== Final murder ==
On October 7, 1932, Garduno poisoned his 16-year-old stepson, Filemon Martinez, with whiskey laced with strychnine. Garduno was convicted of first degree murder. The jury did not make a recommendation for mercy, making a death sentence mandatory. Upon passing the sentence, the judge told Garduno "this is the third time you have been tried for taking human life: so far as this court is concerned it will be the last."

After his appeals failed, Garduno was executed in the electric chair at the Penitentiary of New Mexico on July 21, 1933. He was one of the first two inmates executed by electrocution in New Mexico, the other being 43-year-old Thomas Johnson, who had killed a young woman, attacked her mother, and beaten and robbed a garage attendant. The two were executed on the same day, with Johnson being executed first.

Garduno met with his mother and sister before he was executed. His last meal consisted of a chicken dinner. Garduno's last words were "I forgive everyone for whatever has been done. I hold no malice." He was pronounced dead at 1:12 AM.

== See also ==
- List of people executed in New Mexico
- List of serial killers in the United States
