= List of people executed in the United States in 2000 =

Eighty-five people, eighty-three male and two female, Betty Lou Beets and Christina Marie Riggs, were executed in the United States in 2000, eighty by lethal injection and five, four in Alabama and one in Virginia, were carried out by electrocution. Forty of them were in the state of Texas; the most carried out within a single year in Texas state history. The state of Tennessee carried out its first execution since 1960, that of Robert Glen Coe.

== List of people executed in the United States in 2000 ==
No.	Date of execution	Name	Age of person			Gender	Ethnicity	State	Method	Ref.
No.	Date of execution	Name	At execution	At offense	Age difference	Gender	Ethnicity	State	Method	Ref.
1	January 6, 2000	Malcolm Rent Johnson	41	23	18	Male	Black	Oklahoma	Lethal injection	
2	January 7, 2000	David Ray Duren	37	21	16	Male	White	Alabama	Electrocution	
3	January 10, 2000	Douglas Christopher Thomas	26	17	9	Male	White	Virginia	Lethal injection	
4	January 12, 2000	Earl Carl Heiselbetz Jr.	48	40	8	Male	White	Texas	Lethal injection	
5	January 13, 2000	Gary Alan Walker	46	30	16	Male	White	Oklahoma	Lethal injection	
6	January 13, 2000	Steve Edward Roach	23	17	6	Male	White	Virginia	Lethal injection	
7	January 18, 2000	Spencer Corey Goodman	31	22	9	Male	White	Texas	Lethal injection	
8	January 20, 2000	David Hicks	38	26	12	Male	Black	Texas	Lethal injection	
9	January 21, 2000	Larry Keith Robison	42	24	18	Male	White	Texas	Lethal injection	
10	January 24, 2000	Billy George Hughes Jr.	47	24	23	Male	White	Texas	Lethal injection	
11	January 25, 2000	Glen Charles McGinnis	27	17	10	Male	Black	Texas	Lethal injection	
12	January 27, 2000	James Walter Moreland	39	22	17	Male	White	Texas	Lethal injection	
13	February 10, 2000	Michael Donald Roberts	42	30	12	Male	Black	Oklahoma	Lethal injection	
14	February 16, 2000	Anthony Lee Chaney	45	28	17	Male	White	Arizona	Lethal injection	
15	February 23, 2000	Cornelius Alan Goss	38	25	13	Male	Black	Texas	Lethal injection	
16	February 23, 2000	Terry Melvin Sims	58	35	23	Male	White	Florida	Lethal injection	
17	February 24, 2000	Anthony Braden Bryan	40	24	16	Male	White	Florida	Lethal injection	
18	February 24, 2000	Betty Lou Beets	62	46	16	Female	White	Texas	Lethal injection	
19	March 1, 2000	Odell Barnes Jr.	31	21	10	Male	Black	Texas	Lethal injection	
20	March 3, 2000	Freddie Lee Wright	48	26	22	Male	Black	Alabama	Electrocution	
21	March 14, 2000	Ponchai Kamau Wilkerson	28	19	9	Male	Black	Texas	Lethal injection	
22	March 15, 2000	Darrell Keith Rich	45	23	22	Male	Native American	California	Lethal injection	
23	March 15, 2000	Patrick Gene Poland	50	27	23	Male	White	Arizona	Lethal injection	
24	March 15, 2000	Timothy Lane Gribble	36	24	12	Male	White	Texas	Lethal injection	
25	March 16, 2000	Lonnie Weeks Jr.	27	20	7	Male	Black	Virginia	Lethal injection	
26	March 22, 2000	James Henry Hampton	62	54	8	Male	White	Missouri	Lethal injection	
27	March 23, 2000	Kelly Lamont Rogers	31	22	9	Male	Black	Oklahoma	Lethal injection	
28	April 14, 2000	Robert Lee Tarver Jr.	52	37	15	Male	Black	Alabama	Electrocution	
29	April 19, 2000	Robert Glen Coe	44	23	21	Male	White	Tennessee	Lethal injection	
30	April 27, 2000	Ronald Keith Boyd	43	28	15	Male	Black	Oklahoma	Lethal injection	
31	May 2, 2000	Christina Marie Riggs	28	26	2	Female	White	Arkansas	Lethal injection	
32	May 4, 2000	Tommy Ray Jackson	43	27	16	Male	Black	Texas	Lethal injection	
33	May 9, 2000	William Joseph Kitchens	37	23	14	Male	White	Texas	Lethal injection	
34	May 11, 2000	Michael Lee McBride	38	23	15	Male	White	Texas	Lethal injection	
35	May 23, 2000	James Davis Richardson	32	19	13	Male	Black	Texas	Lethal injection	
36	May 24, 2000	Richard Donald Foster	47	31	16	Male	White	Texas	Lethal injection	
37	May 25, 2000	Charles Adrian Foster	51	34	17	Male	Black	Oklahoma	Lethal injection	
38	May 25, 2000	James Edward Clayton	33	20	13	Male	Black	Texas	Lethal injection	
39	May 31, 2000	Robert Earl Carter	34	26	8	Male	Black	Texas	Lethal injection	
40	June 1, 2000	James Glenn Robedeaux	51	36	15	Male	Native American	Oklahoma	Lethal injection	
41	June 2, 2000	Pernell La'sha Ford	35	18	17	Male	Black	Alabama	Electrocution	
42	June 6, 2000	Feltus Taylor Jr.	39	30	9	Male	Black	Louisiana	Lethal injection	
43	June 7, 2000	Bennie Eddie Demps	49	26	23	Male	Black	Florida	Lethal injection	
44	June 8, 2000	Roger James Berget	39	24	15	Male	White	Oklahoma	Lethal injection	
45	June 12, 2000	Thomas Wayne Mason	48	39	9	Male	White	Texas	Lethal injection	
46	June 14, 2000	John Albert Burks	44	33	11	Male	Black	Texas	Lethal injection	
47	June 15, 2000	William Clifford Bryson	29	18	11	Male	Black	Oklahoma	Lethal injection	
48	June 15, 2000	Paul Selso Nuncio	31	25	6	Male	Hispanic	Texas	Lethal injection	
49	June 21, 2000	Thomas Harrison Provenzano	51	34	17	Male	White	Florida	Lethal injection	
50	June 22, 2000	Shaka Sankofa	36	17	19	Male	Black	Texas	Lethal injection	
51	June 28, 2000	Bert Leroy Hunter	47	39	8	Male	White	Missouri	Lethal injection	
52	June 29, 2000	Jessy Carlos San Miguel	28	19	9	Male	Hispanic	Texas	Lethal injection	
53	July 6, 2000	Michael David Clagett	39	33	6	Male	White	Virginia	Electrocution	
54	July 12, 2000	Orien Cecil Joiner	50	37	13	Male	White	Texas	Lethal injection	
55	July 20, 2000	Gregg Francis Braun	39	28	11	Male	White	Oklahoma	Lethal injection	
56	July 26, 2000	Juan Salvez Soria	33	18	15	Male	Hispanic	Texas	Lethal injection	
57	August 9, 2000	Brian Keith Roberson	36	22	14	Male	Black	Texas	Lethal injection	
58	August 9, 2000	David Oliver Cruz	33	21	12	Male	Hispanic	Texas	Lethal injection	
59	August 10, 2000	George Kent Wallace	59	46	13	Male	White	Oklahoma	Lethal injection	
60	August 16, 2000	John Thomas Satterwhite	53	32	21	Male	Black	Texas	Lethal injection	
61	August 22, 2000	Richard Wayne Jones	40	25	15	Male	White	Texas	Lethal injection	
62	August 23, 2000	David Earl Gibbs	39	24	15	Male	White	Texas	Lethal injection	
63	August 25, 2000	Daniel Patrick Hauser	30	25	5	Male	White	Florida	Lethal injection	
64	August 30, 2000	Gary Lee Roll	47	39	8	Male	White	Missouri	Lethal injection	
65	August 30, 2000	Jeffery Henry Caldwell	37	25	12	Male	Black	Texas	Lethal injection	
66	August 30, 2000	Russel William Burket	32	25	7	Male	White	Virginia	Lethal injection	
67	September 13, 2000	George Bernard Harris	41	30	11	Male	Black	Missouri	Lethal injection	
68	September 14, 2000	Derek Rocco Barnabei	33	26	7	Male	White	Virginia	Lethal injection	
69	September 27, 2000	Rickey Nolen McGinn	43	36	7	Male	White	Texas	Lethal injection	
70	October 10, 2000	Bobby Lee Ramdass	29	21	8	Male	Black	Virginia	Lethal injection	
71	November 1, 2000	Jeffrey Dillingham	27	19	8	Male	White	Texas	Lethal injection	
72	November 3, 2000	Kevin Dean Young	32	20	12	Male	Black	South Carolina	Lethal injection	
73	November 8, 2000	Donald Jay Miller	36	27	9	Male	White	Arizona	Lethal injection	
74	November 9, 2000	Michael Earl Sexton	34	23	11	Male	Black	North Carolina	Lethal injection	
75	November 9, 2000	Miguel Angel Flores	31	20	11	Male	Hispanic	Texas	Lethal injection	
76	November 14, 2000	Stacey Lamont Lawton	31	23	8	Male	Black	Texas	Lethal injection	
77	November 15, 2000	James Wilson Chambers	48	30	18	Male	White	Missouri	Lethal injection	
78	November 15, 2000	Tony Neyshea Chambers	32	22	10	Male	Black	Texas	Lethal injection	
79	November 17, 2000	Dwayne L. Weeks	37	28	9	Male	Black	Delaware	Lethal injection	
80	December 5, 2000	Garry Dean Miller	32	21	11	Male	White	Texas	Lethal injection	
81	December 6, 2000	Daniel Joe Hittle	50	39	11	Male	White	Texas	Lethal injection	
82	December 6, 2000	Christopher Cornelius Goins	27	20	7	Male	Black	Virginia	Lethal injection	
83	December 7, 2000	Edward Castro	50	36	14	Male	Hispanic	Florida	Lethal injection	
84	December 7, 2000	Claude Howard Jones	60	49	11	Male	White	Texas	Lethal injection	
85	December 19, 2000	David Dewayne Johnson	37	27	10	Male	Black	Arkansas	Lethal injection	
		Average:	40 years	27 years	13 years					

== Demographics ==
Gender
Male	83	98%
Female	2	2%
Ethnicity
White	42	49%
Black	35	41%
Hispanic	6	7%
Native American	2	2%
State
Texas	40	47%
Oklahoma	11	13%
Virginia	8	9%
Florida	6	7%
Missouri	5	6%
Alabama	4	5%
Arizona	3	4%
Arkansas	2	2%
California	1	1%
Delaware	1	1%
Louisiana	1	1%
North Carolina	1	1%
South Carolina	1	1%
Tennessee	1	1%
Method
Lethal injection	80	94%
Electrocution	5	6%
Month
January	12	14%
February	6	7%
March	9	11%
April	3	4%
May	9	11%
June	13	15%
July	4	5%
August	10	12%
September	3	4%
October	1	1%
November	9	11%
December	6	7%
Age
20–29	11	13%
30–39	37	44%
40–49	23	27%
50–59	11	13%
60–69	3	4%
Total	85	100%

== Executions in recent years ==
Number of executions
2001	66
2000	85
1999	98
Total	249

== See also ==
- List of death row inmates in the United States
- List of most recent executions by jurisdiction
- List of people scheduled to be executed in the United States
- List of women executed in the United States since 1976

Preceded by 1999	List of people executed in the United States in 2000	Succeeded by 2001
