= Murder of Sharilyn Ritchie =

1983 kidnapping and murder of a teacher in Florida

- Sharilyn Ritchie, who was kidnapped and murdered by Glock and Puiatti
- Date: August 16, 1983; 43 years ago
- Location: Bradenton, Florida, United States
- Outcome: Puiatti remains on death row; Glock executed by lethal injection on January 11, 2001
- Deaths: Sharilyn Ritchie (34)
- Convicted: Robert Dewey Glock; Carl Puiatti
- Verdict: Guilty
- Convictions: First-degree murder Kidnapping; Armed robbery
- Sentence: Death

The murder of Sharilyn Ritchie occurred in Dade City, Florida on August 16, 1983. On that day, Ritchie, a home economics teacher of a local high school, was kidnapped by two men, Robert Dewey Glock (May 22, 1961 – January 11, 2001) and Carl Puiatti (born October 3, 1962), from a Bradenton shopping mall, before she was robbed and fatally shot by her abductors. Puiatti and Glock were both arrested and charged with Ritchie's murder. The pair were found guilty of first-degree murder and sentenced to death, and out of the two, Glock was executed by lethal injection on January 11, 2001, while Puiatti remains on death row as of 2026.

== Abduction and murder ==
On August 16, 1983, a 34-year-old home economics teacher was kidnapped, robbed and murdered by two young men in Dade City, Florida.

On that day, the victim, Sharilyn Johnson Ritchie, drove to a Bradenton shopping mall, and when she got out of her automobile, she was confronted at gunpoint by two men, 20-year-old Carl Puiatti and 22-year-old Robert Dewey Glock, who both took $50 from her purse and forced her back inside the car. The pair drove the car away while holding Ritchie hostage, and they reached a bank, where Ritchie withdrew $100 from the bank ATM as demanded by the duo. After retrieving the money, both Glock and Puiatti continued to drive Ritchie's vehicle 60 miles north, until they reached Dade City, and stopped at an orange grove.

After bringing Ritchie to the grove, the two men took Ritchie's wedding ring in spite of her plea to keep both the ring and her husband's catcher's mitt. Although the duo initially abandoned Ritchie and left her alone on the road, they later decided to return and kill her to prevent her from identifying them as the robbers if she reported the crime to the police. Puiatti shot Ritchie twice with a .38 revolver before the pair drove away. However, despite being wounded, Ritchie remained standing. The men then returned a second time, and Glock fired another shot at her. When she still did not fall, they drove back a third time, and Glock fired a final shot, causing Ritchie to collapse to the ground.

Four days after Ritchie's murder, Puiatti and Glock were arrested in New Jersey by State Trooper William Moore after they were stopped for a traffic violation involving an improperly displayed license plate. During a search of the vehicle—identified as Ritchie's car—police discovered two firearms in their possession. Following further investigation, both men were implicated in Ritchie's murder and reportedly confessed to the crime.

The murder was considered one of the most high-profile cases to affect the Palmetto area. During the week of Ritchie's funeral, more than 400 high school students attended her wake.

== Perpetrators ==
=== Robert Glock ===
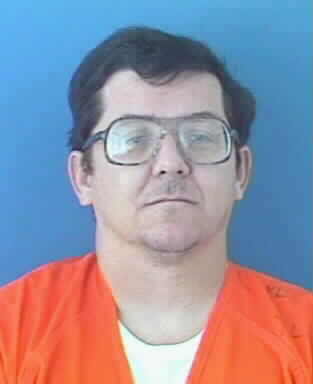
Robert Dewey Glock

Robert Dewey Glock II was born on May 22, 1961, and grew up in South Carolina. He and his sister were physically and emotionally abused by their mother, who raised them alone after Glock's father left the family when he was three. At 13, Glock was sent to an orphanage because his mother could no longer cope with him. He remained there for a year before his biological father, who had remarried, located him with the help of a private investigator and took him in. Glock's stepmother later described him as a "good-hearted" person who had been deprived of maternal love and guidance. However, tensions with his stepmother led him to leave home and enlist in the United States Army. After his discharge, Glock struggled to maintain steady employment, losing one job when his company relocated and another as a tile setter when the business closed. While facing financial hardship, he met Carl Puiatti, and the two became friends over their shared struggles with unemployment and money.

=== Carl Puiatti ===
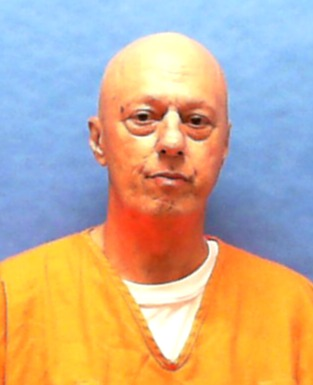
Carl Puiatti

Carl Puiatti was born on October 3, 1962, in Long Island, New York, where he grew up. Although his family life was more stable than Glock's, he faced several personal hardships, including drug addiction, a failed marriage, and the loss of his prematurely born son. A passionate sports fan, particularly of baseball and basketball, Puiatti dreamed of becoming a professional basketball player. However, chronic arthritis in his knees ended those ambitions. At age 16, he fell in with the wrong crowd and became addicted to drugs. He briefly attended counseling, but stopped after his family's meat market closed because of competition from a large supermarket, leaving them unable to afford the sessions. The family later moved to Florida, where Puiatti met his future wife while working at a convenience store. Their marriage was brief and unhappy, and their only child, a son born prematurely in October 1982, died two months later in a Miami hospital. Puiatti was first sent to jail for a stolen check charge, and he was also sentenced to probation and a heavy fine for a burglary case in Orlando, Florida. After his release, Puiatti struggled to find a job and became increasingly depressed.

== Trials of Glock and Puiatti ==
On August 23, 1983, both Carl Puiatti and Robert Glock were extradited back to Florida to face charges, and were detained in the Pasco County Jail. The men were charged with kidnapping, robbery, and first-degree murder.

On October 12, 1983, the two men were formally indicted by a Pasco County grand jury for the murder of Sharilyn Ritchie. Pasco County Assistant State Attorney Robert Cole expressed his intention to seek the death penalty for both men in their upcoming trial. Under Florida state law, a person convicted of first-degree murder faces either the death penalty or life imprisonment. On October 28, 1983, the duo officially pleaded not guilty to the murder charge.

Originally, the duo were scheduled to stand trial on January 23, 1984, but two days before it could take place, the judge granted a motion to delay the trial until March 1984. It was confirmed in March 1984 that both Puiatti and Glock would stand trial together in the same court, after the court denied the defence's application for the pair to receive separate trials.

On March 13, 1984, the defence requested the trial court to suppress the confessions of both men on the basis that their confessions were obtained illegally. Three days later, the trial judge denied the defence's motion to suppress the men's confessions.

Jury selection for the trial began on March 19, 1984, and two days later, a 12-member jury, consisting of seven women and five men, was assembled to hear the case.

On March 23, 1984, the jury found both defendants guilty of premeditated first-degree murder, kidnapping and armed robbery.

A sentencing hearing was conducted on March 23, 1984. Several psychologists were summoned to testify about the troubled lives of the pair before they killed Ritchie. Dr. Gerald Mussenden, a Tampa clinical psychologist, testified that Glock was "extremely sensitive" about his size, full of self-destructive tendencies, and his actions of killing Ritchie were due to him feeling angry and resentful towards women and the failures and rejection in his life. Dr. Mussenden added that Glock would not have killed Ritchie if he did not get involved in a bad and destructive association with his co-defendant Puiatti. Dr. Richard Meadows testified on behalf of Puiatti, stating that his client was suffering from substantial domination of another person, which drove him to commit the murder of Ritchie.

On March 25, 1984, the jury voted 11–1 to recommend the death penalty for both Glock and Puiatti, and the trial judge was scheduled to formally sentence the duo on April 26, 1984. However, on the slated date of sentencing, the judge postponed the hearing until May 4, 1984, because Puiatti applied for more time to allow psychologists to testify on his behalf.

On May 4, 1984, Judge Wayne L. Cobb sentenced both Puiatti and Glock to death by electrocution for the murder of Sharilyn Ritchie, finding that the death penalty was appropriate because the murder was committed in order to avoid arrest and for monetary gain, and it was cold, calculated and premeditated, and there was barely any mitigating circumstances to justify any leniency for the defendants.

== Execution of Glock ==
=== Appeals and execution attempts ===
On December 2, 1985, Robert Glock filed his first appeal to the Florida Supreme Court, seeking a new trial for his case.

On August 21, 1986, the Florida Supreme Court rejected Glock's direct appeal against his death sentence.

On October 29, 1988, then Governor Bob Martinez signed the death warrants of Glock and two more convicts: Amos Lee King Jr. and David Eugene Johnston. Glock and Johnston were both scheduled to be executed by the electric chair on the same date of January 17, 1989, while King was slated to be put to death by electrocution on the earlier date of November 30, 1988.

On January 12, 1989, the Florida Supreme Court dismissed Glock's appeal against his execution. A day later, on January 13, 1989, U.S. District Judge Elizabeth A. Kovachevich issued a stay of execution for Glock.

On November 10, 1999, the 11th Circuit Court of Appeals turned down Glock's appeal and upheld his death sentence.

=== Final death warrant and execution ===
On November 14, 2000, then Governor Jeb Bush signed the death warrants of both Glock and Edward Castro, who were scheduled to be executed one day apart of each other. Glock's execution date was set as December 8, 2000, a day later than Castro's execution (December 7, 2000). Castro was eventually put to death as scheduled.

On December 7, 2000, the eve of Glock's execution, the Florida Supreme Court granted Glock a one-month stay of execution until January 10, 2001, after he applied for time to prepare for a last-minute appeal in which Glock would argue he became a victim of racial profiling by the police. A day after Glock's execution was stayed, a circuit court judge in Dade City dismissed Glock's motion and profiling allegations.

Subsequently, Glock's execution date was rescheduled on January 11, 2001, a day after the expiration date of Glock's execution stay order. He filed another appeal to the Florida Supreme Court to oppose his death sentence. However, on January 5, 2001, the appeal was denied by the Florida Supreme Court. Glock's final appeal was lodged to the U.S. Supreme Court, but in the end, the appeal was turned down on the morning of January 11, 2001, hours before his scheduled execution.

On January 11, 2001, 39-year-old Robert Dewey Glock was put to death by lethal injection at the Florida State Prison. For his last meal, Glock ordered a New York strip steak, fried shrimp, green beans, Coca-Cola and ice cream. In his final statement before the drugs were administered, Glock expressed remorse for the crime and told witnesses that he was deeply sorry for killing and robbing Ritchie 18 years ago. Glock was the 51st inmate to be executed in Florida since the state's 1976 resumption of capital punishment, as well as the first prisoner executed by the state in 2001. Additionally, Glock was the seventh to be executed by lethal injection in Florida since 2000 after the state switched its primary execution method from the electric chair to lethal injection that same year.

Throughout the execution process, Glock's lethal injection was briefly delayed twice: the first was due to the doctors having difficulty locating a suitable vein to inject the drugs, while the second was due to Glock wanting to speak to the prison warden James Crosby and let out his regret for Ritchie's death. Glock was pronounced dead at 6:28pm, 13 minutes after the drugs were administered to him. Glock's wife, whom he married in prison in September 2000 after they first met through the internet, was among a dozen anti-death penalty protestors who gathered outside the prison at the time of her husband's execution, and she stated to the press that her husband felt sorry for murdering Ritchie throughout the 18 years he spent on death row, and she described her husband's death as "premeditated murder" by the state of Florida.

== Appeals of Puiatti ==
On December 2, 1985, Carl Puiatti submitted his first appeal against the death sentence to the Florida Supreme Court, and he also sought a new trial just like his co-defendant Glock.

On August 21, 1986, the Florida Supreme Court rejected Puiatti's direct appeal against his death sentence, the same day when Glock also lost his appeal to the same court.

On April 28, 1987, the U.S. Supreme Court dismissed Puiatti's appeal against the death sentence, and remitted his case back to the Florida Supreme Court to review his conviction another time.

On March 17, 1988, the Florida Supreme Court denied Puiatti's appeal and affirmed both his conviction and sentence.

On October 3, 1988, the U.S. Supreme Court denied the appeals of Puiatti and six other death row convicts from Florida against their respective sentences.

On September 28, 1989, then Governor Bob Martinez scheduled an execution date of December 6, 1989, for Puiatti. However, for legal reasons, Puiatti's execution date was staved off.

On October 3, 1991, Puiatti's petition for a writ of habeas corpus was rejected by the Florida Supreme Court.

As of December 2007, Puiatti was one of seven death row inmates from Pasco County. Since his crime took place in 1983 and he was sentenced in 1984, Puiatti was the longest-serving death row prisoner held for a crime committed in Pasco County.

On January 23, 2018, the Florida Supreme Court rejected Puiatti's re-sentencing petition. Puiatti filed the motion to overturn his death sentence since it was imposed by a non-unanimous vote, after the laws of Florida were changed in 2016 to approve only unanimous jury verdicts to sentence an offender to the death penalty. However, the court refused the plea given that Puiatti's direct appeals were exhausted and his death sentence was finalized before 2002, and hence he was ineligible for re-sentencing due to the new law cannot retroactively apply to his case. The new law was only in effect for five more years before incumbent governor Ron DeSantis signed a bill to enable a minimum of eight jurors to impose the death penalty, partly due to the notorious Parkland mass shooter Nikolas Cruz avoiding the death penalty for the murders of 17 students and school staff members after the jury failed to unanimously vote for capital punishment.

As of May 2019, Puiatti was one of six inmates from Pasco County awaiting execution on Florida's death row. As of 2026, Puiatti remains incarcerated on death row at the Union Correctional Institution.

== See also ==
- Capital punishment in Florida
- List of people executed in Florida
- List of people executed in the United States in 2001
- List of death row inmates in the United States § Florida

Executions carried out in Florida
Preceded by Edward Castro; December 7, 2000	Robert Dewey Glock II; January 11, 2001	Succeeded by Rigoberto Sanchez-Velasco; October 2, 2002
Executions carried out in the United States
Preceded by Eddie Trice – Oklahoma; January 9, 2001	Robert Dewey Glock II – Florida; January 11, 2001	Succeeded by Wanda Jean Allen – Oklahoma; January 11, 2001
