= Robin Meyers =

American minister, activist, and writer

The Reverend Robin Meyers
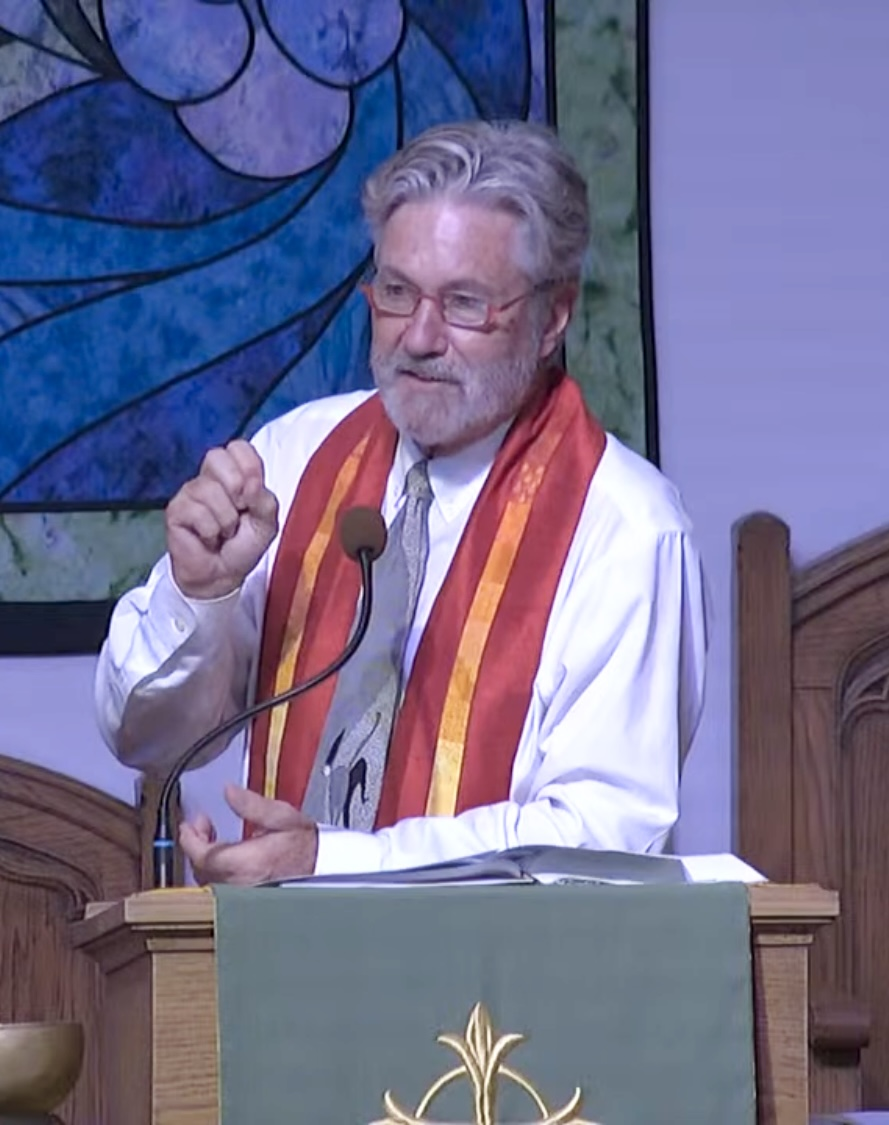
- Meyers preaching at First Congregational Church of Norman UCC in August 2022.
- Born: Robin Rex Meyers; 1952 (age 73–74); Oklahoma City
- Education: Wichita State University (B.A. 1975); Phillips University (M.Div. 1979); Drew University (D.Min. 1981); University of Oklahoma (Ph.D.Rhetoric 1991)
- Occupations: Christian minister, philosophy professor, writer
- Spouse: Shawn Meyers
- Ordained: United Church of Christ

Religious life
- Religion: Christianity (Mainline Protestantism)
- Denomination: United Protestant (of the United Church of Christ)
- Church: First Congregational Church of Norman UCC (2021-present); Mayflower Congregational UCC, Oklahoma City (1985 - 2020)
- Profession: Pastor
- Website: robinmeyers.com

Robin Rex Meyers is an American Mainline Protestant minister, peace activist, philosopher and author of seven books on Liberal and Progressive Christian theology in Western society and the Christian left. He has been a syndicated columnist and a commentator for National Public Radio and was the Senior Minister of the Mayflower Congregational United Church of Christ in Oklahoma City from 1985 to 2020. He is a Distinguished Professor of Social Justice in the Philosophy Department at Oklahoma City University, where he has taught since 1991. Meyers is currently the Teaching Pastor of First Congregational Church of Norman UCC in Norman, Oklahoma, and Distinguished Professor of Social Justice Tenured at Oklahoma City University.

== Early life and education ==
Robin Meyers was born in Oklahoma City, and was raised in Wichita, Kansas. His father, Dr. Robert Meyers, was originally an ordained minister in the Church of Christ and Professor of English Literature at the church-affiliated Harding University; however he lost his job in 1959 for supporting desegregation at the school. His father later left the Church of Christ to become pastor at Plymouth Congregationalist Church in Wichita from 1970 to 1983.

In early 2012, a week after his father died aged 88, Meyers dedicated a sermon to him. He told the Congregation:

I remember vividly the stands my father took on civil rights, his protests of the Vietnam War from his pulpit, and his unshakable faith in the life-saving power of a non-literal interpretation of Scripture. In countless sermons, he insisted that we follow a human Jesus, who is the Christ not because he was God, or Superman, but because his teachings were the answer to the problem of human existence and whose actions were the love of God incarnate. Some things are ridiculously self-evident ... I am my father's son.

After graduating with a Bachelor of Arts from Wichita State University (1975), Meyers received a Masters of Divinity from the Graduate Seminary of Phillips University (1979), a Doctor of Ministry from Drew University in Madison, New Jersey (1981), and a doctorate in rhetoric (persuasion and preaching) from the University of Oklahoma (1991).

== Career ==
Meyers is a fellow of the Westar Institute (home of the Jesus Seminar), and a frequent preacher and speaker at church conferences and communication workshops across the United States. He travels and lectures monthly in the United States on Progressive Christianity, has lectured in North Wales (Gladstone's Library) and toured Australia and New Zealand as the Common Dreams Lecturer in 2016. He has been a finalist for the pulpit of The Riverside Church on two occasions, the Earl Preacher at the Earl Lectures in Berkeley in 2000, and winner of the Angie Debo Civil Libertarian of the Year Award from the ACLU.

Meyers has appeared on Dateline NBC, the PBS NewsHour with Jim Lehrer, and ABC World News. He has also written for the journal The Christian Century. Meyers delivered the Lyman Beecher Lectures at the Yale Divinity School in 2013 with addresses on "Faith as Resistance" to ego, orthodoxy and empire. These lectures form the basis of his second most recent book, Spiritual Defiance: Building a Beloved Community of Resistance.

Meyers credits the late American New Testament scholar, theologian and author Marcus Borg as a major theological influence, as well as his seminary Preaching Professor and mentor Fred Craddock. He is married to Shawn Meyers, an Oklahoma City artist; they are parents to three adult children and have two grandchildren.

== Views ==
=== Theology and Church Reform ===
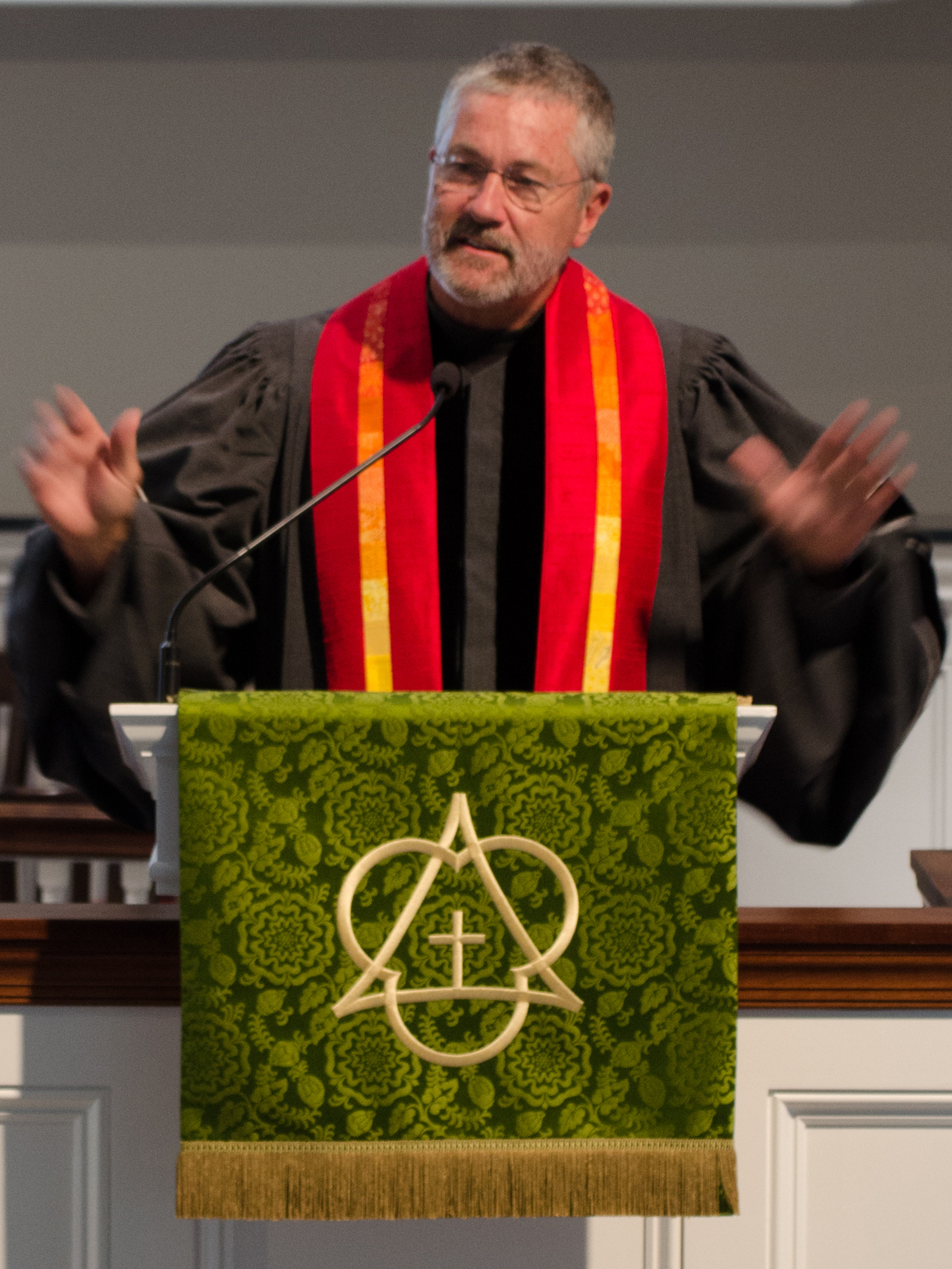
Meyers at Mayflower Congregational UCC in September 2015.

In his writing and preaching Meyers emphasizes the humanness of Jesus and the literary (rather than literal) nature of the Hebrew Scriptures and the New Testament, stating that: "I seek to build, not a collection of 'believers', but a beloved community devoted to embodying peace and justice". Meyers contends that Christianity "was once, and must be again, about following Jesus, not about worshiping Christ". He calls on modern Christianity to return to the core beliefs and practices of the early Church before the Roman Emperor Constantine the Great converted to Christianity; by focusing on orthopraxy (faithful practice) and social justice rather than orthodoxy (right belief). Meyers describes his approach to Christianity as "non-literal, non-dogmatic, and profoundly subversive". His goal to empower Christians to live subversively according to a different way of being has been compared to that of the Old Testament scholar Walter Brueggemann and endorsed by South African Archbishop Emeritus Desmond Tutu. In 2012, Meyers told the Decatur Herald & Review:

What I try to say is that we should be subversive for the cause of love of God and neighbor, which is the essence of the gospel. Saying 'subversive' sounds like a dirty word, like something sneaky or illegal, but I'm talking about being counter-cultural, of changing the things that we value. It's about uniting yourself with your neighbor to do work for the common good.

=== Human Rights and Interfaith Dialogue ===
Meyers opposes the death penalty and attempted to save the life of Wanda Jean Allen, whom the State of Oklahoma executed by lethal injection in January, 2001, for the murder of her girlfriend. He spoke on Allen's behalf at an Oklahoma Pardon and Parole Board clemency hearing and was one of her nominated witnesses at the execution. He appeared in the HBO documentary, The Execution of Wanda Jean, which was screened at the 2002 Sundance Film Festival.

Meyers supports gay rights. He cites the New Testament story of the evangelist Philip baptizing the Ethiopian eunuch in Acts 8: 26–40 as "the most powerful story in the Bible to argue in favor of full inclusion of all people regardless of sexual orientation into the full sacramental hospitality of the Church" because it contradicts the Old Testament law in Deuteronomy 23:1 that rendered a eunuch an outcast. Meyers also contends that the Prophet Isaiah, whom the eunuch was reading while meeting Philip, "is on record as saying even eunuchs will be welcomed into the reign of God because God's love is unconditional ... it is for everyone who is on the outside looking in". In the debate about the place of the LGBT community within the Church he describes this story as "the most important and overlooked story in the New Testament". Mayflower Congregational UCC voted unanimously to become an "open and affirming" congregation in 1999. In October 2014 it celebrated 14 wedding ceremonies between same-sex couples on the same day. Meyers told the congregation that "love is a gender-less thing".

Meyers is also involved in interfaith dialogue and spoke publicly against a Florida church's plans to burn copies of the Quran on the ninth anniversary of the Sept. 11, 2001, terrorist attacks.

=== The Broader Church ===
Meyers eschews evangelical Christianity's emphasis on salvation and does not think that Christians need to believe in conventional marks of the Church, including Jesus' physical resurrection, ascension into heaven, virgin birth or position as the son of God. Rather, he believes that religious leaders should address social issues such as greed, saying that "money is the last taboo in church". He links this issue to social justice and perceptions of inequality in the judicial system, in that "we'll send an African-American teenager off to the slammer who robs a 7-Eleven, but we won't do anything to a banker who helped cause the collapse of the entire banking system".

With respect to the Church as a whole, Meyers once told a book-signing audience that "to put it in the language of 12-step programs, we need to do an intervention on ourselves". He contends that high divorce rates in the "Bible Belt" states of Tennessee, Arkansas, Alabama and Oklahoma are linked to "fairy-tale conceptions of marriage" within fundamentalist Protestant denominations in that "they have that whole dogma of 'This is right, this is wrong' and nothing in between. They don't have the mental dexterity to make the adjustments to a less-than-perfect marriage".

Two of Meyers' former seminary professors responded to the 2009 publication of Saving Jesus from the Church. The first, the former Dean of the Seminary Dr Joe R. Jones, wrote a "decidedly personal and theological" post on his personal blog about Meyers, admitting in the conclusion its "ad hominem" nature and that they must not ever have connected theologically even though he had been invited to preach in Meyers' church in 2002. He lamented Meyers' work, speculating that it might be driven subconsciously by reaction against a fundamentalist upbringing, which led him out of theological agreement with Jones' lectures and systematic theology ("There being no real evidence that Robin ever did hear my lectures or read the Grammar") and contrasted their supposed preferred theological sources by name, albeit without noting those referenced in the book's citations. The second former seminary professor, the late Dr. Fred Craddock, emeritus professor at Emory University, was cited by Meyers as his primary mentor and is quoted and thanked in the book. Craddock endorsed Meyer's writing with the words "The time is right for this book and this book is right for the time." Meyer's book was also endorsed by church scholar Diana Butler Bass and Archbishop Desmond Tutu who wrote the following:

Every once in a while, a book comes along that changes everything. This is the book. It is scholarly, pastoral, prophetic, and eloquent—all in equal measure. Robin Meyers has spoken truth to power, and the church he loves will never be the same.

=== Politics, Peace and the Environment ===
Shortly after George W. Bush was re-elected as US president in November 2004, Meyers became known via the Internet for an anti-war speech he delivered at an Oklahoma University peace rally at which he told the crowd: "This country is bankrupt. The war is morally bankrupt. The claim of this administration to be Christian is bankrupt".

The Bush re-election has been cited as a defining moment in motivating authors such as Meyers to articulate approaches to faith that differ from those of the Religious Right. In this respect Meyers has been read or reviewed alongside writers including Jim Wallis, Rabbi Michael Lerner, Bill Press, Linda Seger, Randall Balmer, Brian McLaren, Peter Laarman, former U.S. president Jimmy Carter, David L. Holmes, Jan G. Linn, Sister Joan Chittister, the Rev. James Forbes Jr., Gregory A. Boyd, Kathleen Kennedy Townsend, David Kuo and Dan Wakefield.

Meyers' support of environmental issues has been seen as part of a wider movement within American Christianity that now includes some members of the traditionally-conservative evangelical branch of the church.

== Books ==
- With Ears to Hear: Preaching as Self-Persuasion (Pilgrim Press, 1993); (Wipf & Stock Pub, 2007); ISBN 978-1556356308.
- Morning Sun on a White Piano: Simple Pleasures and the Sacramental Life (Doubleday, 1998); (Galilee Trade; Reprint edition 2000); ISBN 978-0385498692.
- The Virtue in the Vice: Finding Seven Lively Virtues in the Seven Deadly Sins (HCI, 2004); ISBN 978-0757302213.
- Why the Christian Right is Wrong: A Minister's Manifesto for Taking Back Your Faith, Your Flag, and Your Future (Jossey Bass, 2006); ISBN 978-0470184639.
- Saving Jesus From The Church: How To Stop Worshiping Christ and Start Following Jesus (Harper One, 2009); ISBN 978-0061568220.
- The Underground Church: Reclaiming the Subversive Way of Jesus (Jossey Bass, 2012); ISBN 978-1118061596.
- Spiritual Defiance: Building a Beloved Community of Resistance (Yale University Press, 2015); I ISBN 978-0300203523.
- "Saving God from Religion: A Minister's Search for Faith in a Skeptical Age" (Convergent Penguin Random House, 2020); ISBN 978-1984822512.
