= Stanley Lingar =

American prisoner executed in Missouri in 2001

- Born: April 16, 1963
- Died: February 7, 2001 (aged 37); Potosi Correctional Center, Missouri, U.S.
- Known for: Controversy over allegations that his homosexuality was a factor in his sentencing
- Status: Executed by lethal injection
- Conviction: First degree murder
- Penalty: Death sentence

Details
- Victims: 1
- Date: January 6, 1985

Stanley Dewaine Lingar (April 16, 1963 – February 7, 2001) was a prisoner executed for the January 6, 1985, murder of 16-year-old high school junior Thomas Scott Allen in Ripley County, Missouri. The case generated controversy over allegations that anti-gay bias led to Lingar's death sentence.

== Murder of Thomas Allen ==
On the evening of January 5, 1985, Lingar and his friend, Dave Smith, were drinking alcohol and driving around Doniphan, Missouri. They saw Thomas Allen's jeep, which had run out of gas, parked at the side of the road. They offered to take him to a gas station and he accepted. After driving out of town, Lingar ordered Allen to undress. He then ordered Allen to masturbate, but Allen was too frightened to do so. Lingar then drove to his parents' home to retrieve a Winchester .22-caliber rifle. He then drove to a rural area, pointed the gun at Allen and again ordered him to masturbate. Allen asked to get out of the car to urinate, which Lingar and Smith allowed him to do. All three of them got out of the car, and Lingar shot Allen while Allen was urinating. Allen then got up, got into the car and started the ignition but the car stalled because Allen didn't push in the clutch. Lingar shot Allen three more times then, realizing Allen was still alive, Lingar retrieved a tire iron from the car's trunk and used it to beat Allen. After Lingar and Smith got back into the car they noticed that Allen was still alive. Lingar ran him over with the car and then sped away. Lingar and Smith, after talking to Lingar's brother, then disposed of the body, dumping it over a bridge, and cleaned the car. They later pawned the car and dumped the murder weapon on a country road in Kentucky.

== Conviction and appeals ==
In 1986, Lingar was found guilty of murdering Thomas Allen and was sentenced to death by Judge Kenneth D. Pratte after the jury recommended the death penalty. In 1997, after the Missouri Supreme Court upheld Lingar's conviction and sentence, Lingar told his attorneys that he didn't want any further appeals; he later changed his mind.

Dave Smith, in exchange for testifying against Lingar and pleading guilty to second-degree murder, was sentenced to ten years in prison. He was released after serving six years of his sentence.

The attorneys who worked on Lingar's appeal argued the prosecution presented evidence about Lingar's sexual orientation that was irrelevant and prejudicial, and that his attorney at his first trial was inexperienced and failed to present evidence Dave Smith may have masterminded the murder of Thomas Allen. They also argued Lingar's mental state was a mitigating factor, and that he had mental disorders which were undiagnosed at the time of his trial. While in prison he was diagnosed as having Axis I disorders acute paranoid disorder, generalized anxiety disorder and dysthymic disorder along with an Axis II personality disorder, avoidant personality disorder with dependent traits. The Eighth Circuit of Appeals upheld Lingar's death sentence, and an execution date was set after the U.S. Supreme Court declined to hear Lingar's case.

== Controversy ==
Organizations and publications including Queer Watch, the American Civil Liberties Union, Amnesty International, Village Voice and The Advocate supported Lingar's appeal and suggested that he was a victim of homophobia; they believed that the prosecutors prejudiced jurors against the defendant by introducing evidence of Lingar's homosexuality. The prosecutors denied these accusations and said that testimony about Lingar's sexual orientation was meant to establish motive for the murder, and that he was sentenced to die because of the brutality of his crime.

== Execution ==
Approximately forty demonstrators gathered outside of Potosi Correctional Center on February 6, 2001, to protest Lingar's execution. His last meal was a corned beef sandwich and French fries. He declined to make a final statement, but his family issued a statement on his behalf. Lingar was executed by lethal injection at 12:06 a.m. on February 7, 2001.

== See also ==
- List of people executed in Missouri
- List of people executed in the United States in 2001
