= List of people executed in New Mexico =

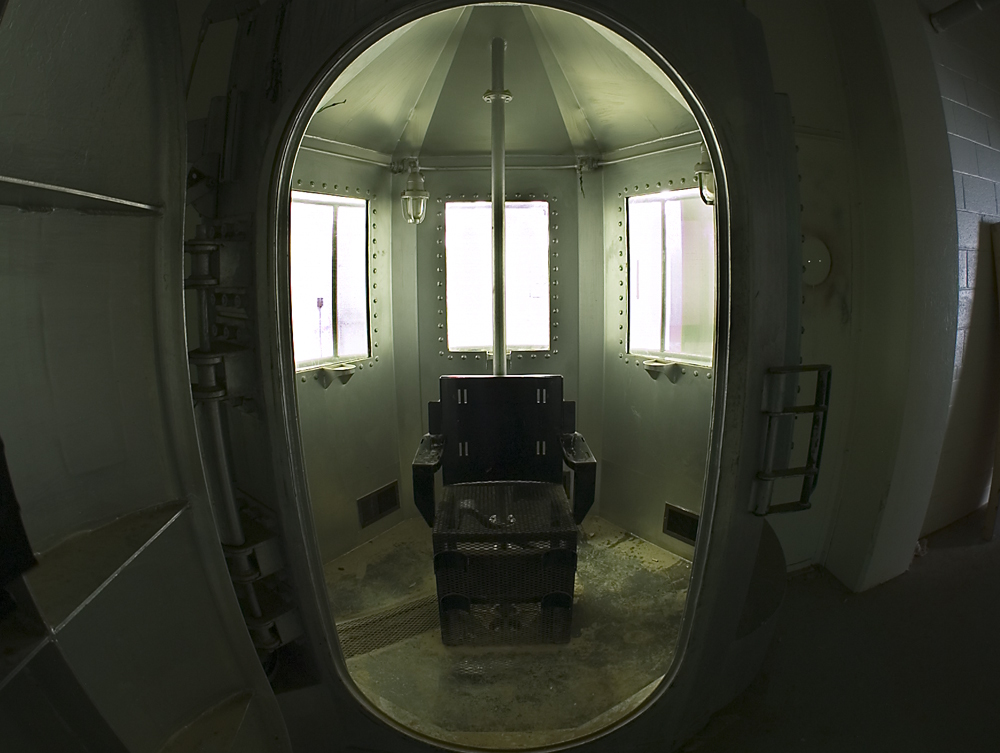
The gas chamber at the Penitentiary of New Mexico

A total of 103 executions have been recorded in New Mexico: four during the Spanish Colonial era (1598–1821), none during the Mexican era (1821–1846), 51 during the Territorial era (1846–1913), 20 by the U.S. Military during the Taos Rebellion (1847), 27 between 1913 and 1960, when the death penalty was removed except for the murder of a police officer, and one since 1976, when the death penalty was reinstated; it remained until March 18, 2009, when Governor Bill Richardson signed a bill abolishing capital punishment into law after many struggles with the issues in previous weeks. Following this repeal, Bernalillo County Sheriff Darren White began a campaign to reinstate the practice by referendum.

Ninety-four of the executions were by hanging, seven by electrocution, one by gas asphyxiation, and one by lethal injection. Two of the hanged, "Black Jack" Ketchum in 1901 and Lucius Hightower in 1916, were accidentally decapitated by the noose due to their weight. Local hangings were replaced by electrocution at the Penitentiary of New Mexico in 1929, which was then further replaced with gas asphyxiation by 1959. The death sentences of five convicts were commuted by Governor Toney Anaya in 1986, on the eve of Thanksgiving.

The following is a list of the 28 executions carried out by the state of New Mexico since 1912. All of those executed were men and all of them were executed for first degree murder.

Name	Race	Age	Date of execution	County	Method	Crime	Victim(s)	Governor
Ivory Frazer	White		April 25, 1913, 4:52 AM	Socorro	Hanging	Murder	Thomas Hall, 47, and A. L. Smithers, white (deputy sheriff and special deputy sheriff)	William C. McDonald
Francisco Granado	Hispanic		April 25, 1913, 4:52 AM	Socorro	Hanging	Murder-Robbery	William S. Clark, white	William C. McDonald
Demecio Delgadillo	Hispanic	32	May 16, 1913, 5:09 AM	Bernalillo	Hanging	Murder-Rape	Soledad Zarrazino de Pino, Hispanic	William C. McDonald
Francisco Alvarez	Hispanic	22	June 9, 1916	Luna	Hanging	Murder	Charles DeWitt Miller, 29, white (Note: Also murdered 17 other white people.)	William C. McDonald
Juan Sanchez	Hispanic	16	June 9, 1916	Luna	Hanging	Murder	James Todd Dean, 61, white (Note: Also murdered 17 other white people.)	William C. McDonald
Taurino Garcia	Hispanic	21	June 30, 1916	Luna	Hanging	Murder	Charles DeWitt Miller, 29, white (Note: Also murdered 17 other white people.)	William C. McDonald
Eusiero Renteria	Hispanic	24	June 30, 1916	Luna	Hanging	Murder	Charles DeWitt Miller, 29, white	William C. McDonald
Juan Castillo	Hispanic	26	June 30, 1916	Luna	Hanging	Murder	Charles DeWitt Miller, 29, white	William C. McDonald
Jose Rangel	Hispanic	23	June 30, 1916	Luna	Hanging	Murder	Charles DeWitt Miller, 29, white	William C. McDonald
Lucius Hightower	White	50	November 13, 1916	Grant	Hanging	Murder	Mrs. Hightower, white (wife)	William C. McDonald
Julian Romero	Hispanic		April 11, 1918	San Miguel	Hanging	Murder	Maria Varela de Jaure, Hispanic	Washington E. Lindsey
Elbert Blancett	White	25	July 9, 1920	Santa Fe	Hanging	Murder	Clyde D. Amour, white	Octaviano Larrazolo
Eleuterio Corral	Hispanic	18	January 20, 1922	Grant	Hanging	Murder	Ventura Bencomo, Hispanic	Merritt C. Mechem
Rumaldo Losano	Hispanic	19	January 20, 1922	Grant	Hanging	Murder	Ventura Bencomo, Hispanic	Merritt C. Mechem
Luis Medrano	Hispanic	27	July 28, 1922	Torrance	Hanging	Murder-Robbery	Anton Coury, white	Merritt C. Mechem
Ysidero Miranda	Hispanic	33	July 28, 1922	Torrance	Hanging	Murder-Robbery	Anton Coury, white	Merritt C. Mechem
Carlos Renteria	Hispanic	24	July 28, 1922	Torrance	Hanging	Murder-Robbery	Anton Coury, white	Merritt C. Mechem
Stephen Katonka	White	40	October 20, 1922	San Juan	Hanging	Murder-Robbery	William Kelly and Sam Groy, white	Merritt C. Mechem
Francisco Vaisa	Hispanic	25	April 6, 1923, 5:30 AM	Torrance	Hanging	Murder-Robbery	Anton Coury, white	James F. Hinkle
Thomas Bishop Jr.	Black	32	July 21, 1933, 12:38-1:12 AM	Bernalillo	Electrocution	Murder-Rape	Angelina Jaramillo, 18, Hispanic	Arthur Seligman
Santiago Garduno	Hispanic	49	July 21, 1933, 12:38-1:12 AM	Rio Arriba	Electrocution	Murder	Filemon Martinez, 16, Hispanic (stepson) (Note: Serial killer, previously convicted of two other murders and suspected of a third murder.)	Arthur Seligman
Pedro Talamante	Hispanic	54	May 10, 1946, 12:10 AM	McKinley	Electrocution	Murder	Antonia Talamante, 25, Hispanic (wife) (Note: Also attempted to murder the victim's 11-year-old brother, Joe Reyes. Reyes was left permanently crippled from his injuries.)	John J. Dempsey
Louis Young	Black	47	June 13, 1947, 12:07 AM	McKinley	Electrocution	Murder-Rape	Eloise Kennedy, 23, white	Thomas J. Mabry
Arthur Fay Johnson	White	57	February 19, 1954, 12:09 AM	Chaves	Electrocution	Murder-Robbery	William Cabrel, 59, white (Note: Had 15 prior felony convictions, including for murder.)	Edwin L. Mechem
Frederick W. Heisler	White	33	October 29, 1954, 12:15 AM	Quay	Electrocution	Murder-Robbery	John Gunnish, 39, white	Edwin L. Mechem
James Larry Upton	White	22	February 12, 1956, 12:09 AM	Bernalillo	Electrocution	Murder-Robbery	Donald Dilley, 18, white	John F. Simms
David Cooper Nelson	White	39	January 8, 1960, 12:20 AM	Valencia	Lethal gas	Murder-Robbery	Ralph Henderson Rainey, 46, white (Note: Possible serial killer, also murdered Kenneth Short in Texas and suspected of the murder of John Valente in Nevada.)	John Burroughs
Terry D. Clark	White	45	November 6, 2001, 7:10 PM	Chaves	Lethal injection	Murder-Rape-Kidnap	Dena Lynn Gore, 9, white (Note: Also kidnapped and raped six-year-old Donita Welch and left her for dead. He was on bail while appealing his conviction for this crime at the time of the murder.)	Gary Johnson

== See also ==
- Capital punishment in New Mexico
