= Edward Castro =

American serial killer (1950–2000)

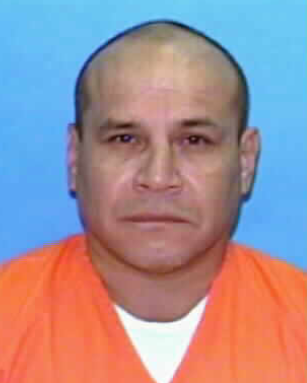
- Born: January 26, 1950; El Cajon, California, U.S.
- Died: December 7, 2000 (aged 50); Florida State Prison, Bradford County, Florida, U.S.
- Cause of death: Lethal injection (execution)
- Status: Executed
- Conviction: First degree murder (2 counts)
- Penalty: Death

Details
- Victims: 3
- Span of crimes: 1986–1987
- Country: United States
- State: Florida
- Date apprehended: January 15, 1987

Edward Castro (January 26, 1950 – December 7, 2000) was an American serial killer. An unemployed drifter from California, Castro fatally stabbed three men in central Florida between 1986 and 1987. Tried for two of the murders, he was given a life sentence for one of them and sentenced to death for the other. He waived all of his appeals and dropped his defense team to advocate for his own execution, which was carried out by lethal injection in 2000 at Florida State Prison.

== Early life ==
Edward Castro was born in El Cajon, California, on January 26, 1950. The exact details of his childhood are not clear; it would come out in later years that when Castro was a child, he was a victim of sexual abuse, but distinct details of the events are not known. He was also diagnosed with a brain disorder. Upon becoming an adult, Castro moved to Florida. As an adult he struggled with alcohol abuse.

== Murders ==
=== Claude Henderson ===
On October 25, 1986, 46-year-old Claude J. Henderson moved into a mobile home in Auburndale, Florida. That same day he was visited by his brother Charles, who said Claude was in good spirits. That was the last time Charles ever spoke to his brother. A few days later, Castro, who recently moved to Polk County, entered Henderson's trailer. He tied Henderson's hands behind his back, tied his feet together, and beat him to death. He left his body face up on his bed. Castro then stole the keys for Henderson's 1973 Chevrolet van and took off with it. On November 4, when acquaintances heard nothing from Henderson, his brother Charles and Charles' friend Roy Allen entered his trailer and found his body.

=== George Hill ===
On January 5, 1987, Castro visited a gay bar in St. Petersburg. He began a conversation with 50-year-old George Larry Hill, an interior designer. Castro told Hill he was interested in going home with him, and after initially declining the offer, Hill agreed and drove Castro to his home. Castro would later tell authorities he was filled with jealousy after walking into Hill's home, which Hill shared with a doctor; the home contained an entertainment center, wall to wall with VCRs and color TVs. Deciding he wanted to kill Hill, Castro entered the kitchen and brandished a knife to Hill's neck. He allegedly told Hill, "Hey, man, you've only got one life to give. Pick a spot". He then tied Hill up and stabbed him four times in the heart area, killing him. Afterwards, Castro scribbled homophobic messages on the walls and then left the home.

=== Austin Scott ===
Only eight days later, Castro paid a motorist $10 to drive him to Tampa, and once there offered him an extra $60 to drive him to Ocala. There, on January 14, 1987, Castro wound up in a gay bar. There, he chatted up with 57-year-old Austin Carter Scott and convinced him to drive him to his apartment. Scott drove Castro back to his one-room apartment, where Castro decided to kill him so he could take his vehicle. From there, he produced a knife and choked Scott, then stabbed him between five and at least fifteen times in the heart area. Afterwards, Castro invited an upstairs neighbor, Robert McKnight, to Scott's apartment. Once inside, Castro ordered him to stab Scott, to which McKnight did. Afterwards, Castro stole his watch, rings, change, and his wallet, then he stole Scott's Ford Maverick and drove off. He later stopped in Lake City to talk to some children about buying crack cocaine, though in later interviews Castro stated that he was joking with them.

== Arrest and trial ==
Castro stole Scott's car and drove to Lake City. When Castro stopped in Columbia County, a sheriff's deputy noticed that his speech was slurred and his breath smelled of alcohol. When confronted, Castro became hostile toward the officers and was arrested. While in a holding cell, Castro confessed to killing all three of his victims. Police were easily able to link him to the last two murders but were stumped at Castro's confession to killing Henderson. Castro told authorities where to find Henderson's van, which he said he abandoned in a parking lot near the Pentecostal Temple Church of God. When police went there, the van was found. Castro was charged with killing Hill and Scott, but not charged in the killing of Henderson.

Castro went on trial for the murder of Scott in 1988. Castro did not try to deny his guilt, and subsequently, he was convicted and sentenced to death. In 1991, he went on trial for the murder of Hill. Prosecutors sought the death sentence in that case, but Castro was ultimately sentenced to life imprisonment. In 1992, the Florida Supreme Court overturned Castro's death sentence and demanded a new sentencing hearing for him. The following year, a jury voted 8–4 for Castro to be sentenced to death.

== Execution ==
In 1994, Castro contacted his attorneys and requested them to drop all of their planned appeals. Two years later, in July 1996, Castro contacted a judge and demanded to drop his defense team and all scheduled appeals. Later that October, Castro changed his mind and stated he wanted to pursue future appeals and representations. Though, that same December, Castro changed his mind yet again and requested to not be represented. The following June, Castro again requested to drop all of his appeals. In 1999, a high court granted Castro's request to drop all of his appeals. In September 2000, with his execution fast approaching, a clemency team was set up to hear Castro's case, though, Castro wrote over 40 letters to them wishing to be executed.

On November 14, 2000, Florida Governor Jeb Bush approved the request to have Castro executed. On December 7, 2000, Castro ate his final meal, which consisted of steak, shrimp, ice cream and cola. Afterwards, he was led to the execution room where he was strapped to a bed. At 6:02 p.m., the lethal injection was administered into his body. After thirteen minutes, at 6:15 p.m., Castro went unresponsive and was declared dead.

The Execution of a Serial Killer is a book about Castro's execution. It was written by Dr. Joseph Diaz, who was a witness to Castro's execution.

== See also ==
- List of people executed in Florida
- List of people executed in the United States in 2000
- List of serial killers in the United States

Executions carried out in Florida
Preceded by Dan Hauser; August 25, 2000	Edward Castro; December 7, 2000	Succeeded by Robert Dewey Glock II; January 11, 2001
Executions carried out in the United States
Preceded by Christopher Goins – Virginia; December 6, 2000	Edward Castro – Florida; December 7, 2000	Succeeded by Claude Jones – Texas; December 7, 2000
