= Timothy Gribble =

Executed American murderer and suspected serial killer

- Born: Timothy Lane Gribble; August 27, 1963; Cook County, Illinois, U.S.
- Died: March 15, 2000 (aged 36); Huntsville Unit, Huntsville, Texas, U.S.
- Cause of death: Execution by lethal injection
- Other name: Timothy Wayne Gribble
- Convictions: Capital murder Rape; False imprisonment
- Penalty: Death

Details
- Victims: 2–3
- Span of crimes: 1985–1987
- Country: United States
- State: Texas
- Date apprehended: September 30, 1987

Timothy Lane Gribble (August 27, 1963 – March 15, 2000) was an American murderer, rapist and self-confessed serial killer who admitted to raping and strangling three women across Texas between 1985 and 1987. Sentenced to death on two occasions for one of the murders, Gribble was executed at the Huntsville Unit in 2000.

== Prior criminal record ==
Gribble's first recorded offense occurred at age 18, when he was arrested for false imprisonment after accosting a woman in Texas City on April 10, 1981. Facing 10 years imprisonment if convicted, he instead accepted a plea deal with the prosecution that mitigated the sentence to 10 years probation and a $750 fine. Two years later, under the alias of 'Timothy Wayne Gribble', he was arrested and sentenced to 5 years imprisonment for raping a 15-year-old girl in Texas City on August 12, 1983.

After spending two years behind bars, Gribble was released. Circa 1985, he married a mother of two named Tammi, with whom he reportedly never was violent. The couple, who were in dire financial straits, attempted to make a living via his father's business in Hitchcock, but he eventually had to take on additional jobs as a carpenter and roofer. He was considered a reliable and helpful person by friends and neighbors, whom he frequently helped with various favors and odd jobs.

== Murders ==
According to Gribble, his first victim was a hitchhiker he had picked up near Dickinson in October or November 1985. The girl, whom he claimed was named "Christina", was in her 20s, had brownish-blondish hair, a medium build and wore blue jeans and a blouse. Gribble told investigators that she had asked for a ride to Austin, and had even paid $10 for gasoline along the way. Instead, Gribble drove towards Fort Bend County, near Highway 95 and the Brazos River, where he raped and choked her to death before dumping the body in the river. Investigators were dispatched to locate the body at the places indicated by him, but as the river had risen several times prior to the officers' arrival, it was never located.

On June 16, 1986, Gribble abducted 23-year-old junior college student Donna Weis from Texas City, and drove her to a wooded lot near Santa Fe, where her father owned a storage business. He took Weis into one of the storage bays before strangling and wrapping her body up in a blue tarp, later burying her body in a shallow grave near Hitchcock.

On September 9, 1987, Gribble was remodelling the roof of 36-year-old Elizabeth "Libby" Jones, an IBM employee who worked at the Johnson Space Center. When Jones failed to appear at work that day, one of her colleagues dropped by her home in Clear Lake Shores to check on her, but found the house locked. Later that day, Gribble returned to the house, ostensibly to retrieve his wallet, but then kidnapped his former employer, driving her around the countryside until he found an isolated area near the FM 646 and the I-45. He then strangled Jones with a cloth sash and left her body near a tree before leaving the area.

== Arrest, investigation and trial ==
A few days after Jones' disappearance, her ex-husband hired a private investigator to interview Gribble, who had already been questioned as a suspect by police. Under pressure, he admitted that a wine bottle and some cigarette butts found at the crime scene were his, but before he could be brought in on charges of sexually assaulting Jones’ ex-wife, Gribble fled the state. On September 30, 1987, he was arrested without incident at a gas station in Newbern, Tennessee, waiving extradition proceedings and voluntarily returning to Texas. In the next few days, Gribble confessed to the Jones murder under questioning, travelling with them to indicate where he had left her body, and the skeletal remains and skull were subsequently found on October 5. Gribble was then remanded to await capital murder charges at a jail in Houston on $200,000 bond.

In November, Gribble contacted his wife and gave her instructions on how to find Weis' body, which she then passed on to police. Not long after, a woman's partially decomposed body was found and positively identified as Weis' via her dental records. Shortly thereafter, Gribble had a recorded interview with Texas Ranger Joe Haralson and Sheriff's Sgt. Wayne Kessler, in which he detailed all three of his murders. These tapes were later played at a hearing on the admissibility of such statements, which Gribble's attorneys sought to have barred from the trial itself.

Eventually, he would be put on trial solely for the murder of Jones - he was never charged in Weis' death. In October 1988, a jury of nine men and three women found Gribble guilty in the murder of Libby Jones. His defense counsel conceded that their client was guilty of the killing, but requested that the conviction be of murder rather than capital murder. Despite this, Gribble was given the death sentence.

== Retrial and death ==
After spending two years on death row, Gribble was given a new trial following a decision by the Supreme Court, Penry v. Lynaugh, which prohibited mentally ill offenders from eligibility for capital punishment. According to his attorney, there were circumstances in Gribble's case that indicated he suffered from mental illness, which had not been presented at his original trial. Nevertheless, Gribble was again convicted and sentenced to death, after the jury deliberated less than two hours.

Gribble would later appeal his sentence to the Supreme Court of Texas in 1995, but his death sentence was again upheld. On March 15, 2000, Gribble was executed by lethal injection at the Huntsville Unit. He was one of three people executed in the United States on that specific day. The others were Darrell Keith Rich in California and Patrick Poland in Arizona. Gribble's last words were:

"I just want you to know from the bottom of my heart that I am truly sorry. I mean it. I'm not saying it."

Prior to his execution, he gave a handwritten statement to the prison chaplain, James Brazzil, in which he apologized for his crimes and criticised the use of the death penalty.

== See also ==
- Capital punishment in Texas
- Capital punishment in the United States
- List of people executed by lethal injection
- List of people executed in Texas, 2000–2009
- List of people executed in the United States in 2000
- List of serial killers in the United States
