= David Dewayne Johnson =

American murderer (1963–2000)

- Born: January 10, 1963
- Died: December 19, 2000 (aged 37); Cummins Unit, Arkansas, U.S.
- Status: Executed by lethal injection
- Conviction: Capital murder
- Penalty: Death

Details
- Victims: Leon Brown, 67
- Date: September 2, 1989

David Dewayne Johnson (January 10, 1963 – December 19, 2000) was an American murderer executed for the 1989 murder of Leon Brown, 67, in Little Rock, Arkansas.

== Murder ==
On September 2, 1989, Johnson entered a warehouse and convinced the night watchman, 67-year-old Leon Brown, that he needed to use the telephone to get his car, a white Oldsmobile, out of a ditch nearby. Dudley Swann, the principal stockholder in Little Rock Crate and Basket identified Johnson as the driver of the white Oldsmobile. Swann had earlier asked Johnson to leave and come back the next day to get his car because he did not want the driver on the premises after dark. Brown was found later beaten to death with a 2x4 in a pool of blood. Johnson's fingerprints were found at the scene and Johnson was in possession of property stolen from the warehouse.

== Trial and appeals ==
On November 30, 1990, Johnson was convicted of capital murder and sentenced to death. He later appealed his sentence by claiming his lawyer was manic-depressive and incapable of defending an accused murderer. His original lawyer's law license had also been suspended in 1993, after Johnson's conviction.

The Eighth Circuit Court of Appeals upheld the denial of Johnson's appeal. The court's March ruling acknowledged that Johnson's first lawyer might have been mentally ill during his trial, that he did not press hard to admit certain testimony, and that he behaved unprofessionally during jury selection. "We nevertheless are convinced that the governing law requires that this conviction and sentence be upheld", the judges wrote. "We deal in specific facts, not abstractions, and the petitioner has failed to show any reasonable likelihood that the outcome of this case would have been different even if his lawyer had conducted himself perfectly", the opinion said.

== Execution ==
Johnson made no final statement. He was executed at 9:11 p.m. on December 19, 2000, by lethal injection.

Brown had two sons, both of whom lived out of state. Neither attended the execution.

Johnson was the 23rd person executed by the state of Arkansas since Furman v. Georgia, after new capital punishment laws were passed in Arkansas and that came into force on March 23, 1973.

Johnson was the last person to be executed in the United States of America in the 20th century.

== See also ==
- List of people executed in Arkansas
- List of people executed in the United States in 2000

Executions carried out in Arkansas
Preceded by Christina Marie Riggs May 2, 2000	David Dewayne Johnson; December 19, 2000	Succeeded by Clay King Smith May 8, 2001
Executions carried out in the United States
Preceded by Claude Jones – Texas December 7, 2000	David Dewayne Johnson – Arkansas; December 19, 2000	Succeeded by Jack Clark – Texas January 9, 2001
