= Robert Fry (murderer) =

American serial killer (b. 1973)

- Born: August 18, 1973 (age 53); Farmington, New Mexico, U.S.
- Convictions: First degree murder (4 counts); First degree kidnapping (2 counts); First degree attempted criminal sexual penetration Attempted armed robbery Tampering with evidence (4 counts); Intimidation of a witness (2 counts); Larceny
- Penalty: Death; commuted to life imprisonment

Details
- Victims: 4
- Span of crimes: 1996–2000
- State: New Mexico
- Imprisoned at: Penitentiary of New Mexico

Robert Fry (born August 18, 1973) is an American serial killer who was sentenced to death for the murder of a woman in 2000. He was also convicted of three additional murders that date back to 1996. In 2019, ten years after New Mexico repealed the death penalty, his death sentence was commuted to life.

== Case details ==
Fry, along with Leslie Engh, were initially arrested for the murder of Betty Lee in 2000, who was found bludgeoned and stabbed to death in San Juan County. The two offered Lee a ride after they saw her at a payphone. From there, they killed her after attempting to rape her. Police were able to connect the pair to the murder through DNA evidence as well as shoe imprints and tire tracks. Sometime after his arrest, Fry was linked to the murders of Donald Tsosie, Matthew Trecker and Joseph Fleming, the latter two of whom were killed at a store in Farmington. In 2002, Fry was convicted of Lee's murder and was sentenced to death. He was also sentenced to life for Tsosie's murder. In 2005, Fry received two more life sentences for the murders of Trecker and Fleming. He was additionally convicted of larceny, tampering with evidence and intimidation of a witness in connection with the double murder. In 2013, a judge upheld Fry's death sentence.

Leslie Engh pleaded guilty to two counts of first degree murder and two counts of first degree kidnapping in the deaths of Lee and Tsosie and was sentenced to life in prison.

== Subsequent developments ==
Despite New Mexico repealing capital punishment in 2009, Robert Fry, along with Timothy Allen remained on death row. However, in June 2019, the New Mexico Supreme Court vacated their death sentences which were then commuted to life without parole. Although New Mexico did not have life without parole prior to the abolition of capital punishment in 2009, Fry will spend the rest of his life in prison as his four consecutive life terms render him ineligible for parole for 120 years. As for Allen, he was given an additional 25 years to his life sentence. At the time, New Mexico state law required inmates with a life sentence to serve at least 30 years before being eligible for parole, therefore Allen will be required to serve at least 55 years before getting a chance at parole. The crime in which Allen was incarcerated for was the 1994 strangling murder of 17-year-old Sandra Phillips. He was also convicted of kidnapping and rape in connection with the killing.

== Victims ==
Robert Fry killed four people over the span of four years.

- Joseph Fleming, 25 - November 28, 1996, Farmington
- Matthew Trecker, 18 - November 28, 1996, Farmington
- Donald Tsosie, 40 - April, 1998, San Juan County
- Betty Lee, 36 - June, 2000, San Juan County

Fry's accomplice, Leslie Engh, was present for the murders of Tsosie and Lee. He was convicted of first degree murder for their deaths and is currently in prison.

== See also ==
- Capital punishment in New Mexico
- List of serial killers in the United States
