= Wanda Jean Allen =

American woman executed in 2001

- Inmate mugshot
- Born: August 17, 1959; United States
- Died: January 11, 2001 (aged 41); Oklahoma State Penitentiary, Oklahoma, U.S.
- Status: Executed by lethal injection
- Convictions: First degree manslaughter (1982); First degree murder (April 18, 1989)
- Penalty: 4 years imprisonment (Pettus murder); Death (Leathers murder)
- Accomplice: Gloria Jean Leathers

Wanda Jean Allen (August 17, 1959 – January 11, 2001) was sentenced to death in 1989 for the murder of Gloria Jean Leathers, 29, her longtime girlfriend, in Oklahoma City. In 2001, Allen was the first black woman to be executed in the United States since 1954. She was the sixth woman to be executed since 1977, after executions resumed in the United States.

Filmmaker Liz Garbus worked with Allen to chronicle her final appeals and the last three months of her life. These were the basis of the documentary, The Execution of Wanda Jean (2002).

== Background ==
Wanda Jean Allen was born on August 17, 1959, the second of eight children. Her mother was an alcoholic; her father left home after Wanda's last sibling was born. The family lived in public housing and scraped by on public assistance.

At the age of 12, Allen was hit by a truck and knocked unconscious. At 14 or 15, she was stabbed in the left temple. Testing after this found that Allen's abilities were markedly impaired and that her IQ was 69. There was consequently blunt force trauma dealt to her brain that resulted in the left hemisphere being rendered dysfunctional: this reportedly impaired her comprehension, her ability to logically express herself, and her ability to analyze cause and effect relationships. Examiners concluded that Allen was more chronically vulnerable than others to becoming disorganized by everyday stresses, and thus more vulnerable to a loss of control under stress.

By age 17, she had dropped out of high school.

== Death of Dedra Pettus ==
In 1981, Allen was sharing an apartment with Dedra Pettus, a childhood friend. They had become involved in a lesbian relationship. On June 29, 1981, they got into an argument, and Allen shot and killed Pettus.

In her 1981 confession, Allen stated that she accidentally shot Pettus from roughly 30 feet away while returning fire from Pettus's boyfriend. However, the forensic evidence was inconsistent with Allen's story. In particular, a police expert believed that bruises and powder burns on Pettus's body indicated that Allen had pistol-whipped her, then shot her at point-blank range. But, prosecutors cut a deal with Allen, and she received a four-year sentence in exchange for a guilty plea to a manslaughter charge. She served two years of the sentence.

Pettus was buried at Trice Hill Cemetery in Oklahoma City, Oklahoma.

== Gloria Jean Leathers ==
By 1988 Allen was living with Gloria Jean Leathers, her girlfriend, in Oklahoma City. The two had met in prison; they had a turbulent and violent relationship.

On December 2, 1988, Leathers and Allen got involved in a dispute at a grocery store. A city police officer escorted the two women to their house and stood by while Leathers collected her belongings. Before Leathers left the house, Allen asked her to "stay and attempt to work out their difficulties." When Allen followed Leathers to her car, Leathers grabbed a garden rake, and struck Allen in the face with it. Leathers and her mother left and drove to the Oklahoma City police station to file a complaint against Allen.

Allen followed them, later claiming that she was trying to get Leathers not to leave her. When Allen approached Leathers in the parking lot, she saw Leathers still had the rake. Allen returned to her car, grabbed a gun, and, when she saw Leathers closely approaching, fired one shot that severely wounded Leathers. Leathers' mother witnessed the shooting. Two police officers and a dispatcher in the station heard the shot fired, but no police department employee witnessed the shooting. Later the police recovered a .38-caliber handgun near the women's home. They believe it was used in the shooting. Leathers died from the injury three days later, on December 5, 1988.

Leathers was buried at Green Acres Memorial Gardens Cemetery, located in Sperry, Oklahoma.

== Trial ==
The state charged Allen with first-degree murder and announced that it would seek the death penalty. Evidence that Leathers had a history of violent conduct, and that she had stabbed a woman to death in Tulsa, Oklahoma in 1979, was central to Allen's self-defense argument at her trial. Allen testified that she feared Leathers because of her boasting about the 1979 killing. The defense sought to corroborate this claim with testimony from Leathers' mother, whom Leathers had told about the fatal stabbing. But, the prosecution objected. The court prohibited the introduction of such testimony because it was considered hearsay.

The prosecutor depicted Allen as a remorseless liar. The jury found her guilty of first-degree murder and sentenced her to death.

During the punishment phase, the prosecutors argued that Allen should be sentenced to death because she had been previously convicted of a felony involving the use or threat of violence; that she was a continuing threat to society; and she committed the murder to avoid arrest or prosecution. The jury found that the first two aggravating circumstances existed in Allen's case.

Her defense presented numerous mitigating circumstance, including a good relationship with her family, good work habits, and her fear of the victim.

In the sentencing phase, the prosecution retrieved details about the circumstances of the death of Dedra Pettus, even comparing that earlier crime to Leathers's death.

In a 1991 affidavit, Allen's defense lawyer David Presson stated that after the trial, he learned that when Allen was 15 years old, her IQ was measured at 69, placing her "just within the upper limit of the classification of mental retardation", according to the psychologist who analyzed her. In addition, an examining doctor had recommended a neurological assessment because she manifested symptoms of brain damage. The lawyer stated, "I did not search for any medical or psychological records or seek expert assistance for use at the trial."

A psychologist conducted a comprehensive evaluation of Allen in 1995 and found clear and convincing evidence of cognitive and sensory-motor deficits and brain dysfunction, possibly linked to an adolescent head injury.

Of the five members of the Oklahoma Pardon and Parole Board, three were appointed by Governor Frank Keating.

Keating considered giving Allen a stay based on the narrow issue of whether the Oklahoma Pardon and Parole Board had enough information regarding her education. Allen's attorneys have pointed to her score, a 69, on an IQ test she took in the 1970s, arguing she was in the range of intellectual disability.

Prosecutors said Allen testified during the penalty phase of her trial that she had graduated from a high school and received a medical assistant certificate from a college. But they said that, in fact, Allen dropped out of high school at 16 and never finished course work in the medical assistant program.

== Execution ==
Allen spent 12 years on death row. Her application for clemency was denied.

While in prison, she became a born-again Christian. The Reverend Robin Meyers, who served as a spiritual adviser to Allen, is quoted as saying,

I always suspected that Wanda's renunciation of lesbianism had more to do with helping to revamp herself in the most palatable way for her clemency and appeal processes. She knew perfectly well that her being a lesbian was a big strike against her and that it's an embarrassment in the black community. She was going to play the best hand that she could play at the very end.

Allen was executed by lethal injection by the State of Oklahoma on Thursday, January 11, 2001 at Oklahoma State Penitentiary in McAlester. Twenty-four relatives of murder victim Gloria Leathers and manslaughter victim Dedra Pettus traveled there for the execution. Many of them watched the execution from behind a tinted window. While lying on the execution gurney, Allen said, "Father, forgive them. They know not what they do." She also stuck her tongue out and smiled at her appeal lawyer, David Presson, who had become her friend. He says she was "dancing on the mattress, while they tried to kill her." She was pronounced dead at 9:21 p.m. Relatives of Leathers expressed the execution gave them "closure".

She was buried at Trice Hill Cemetery in Oklahoma City.

== See also ==
- Capital punishment in Oklahoma
- Capital punishment in the United States
- List of people executed in Oklahoma
- List of people executed in the United States in 2001
- List of women executed in the United States since 1976

Executions carried out in Oklahoma
| Preceded by Eddie Trice January 9, 2001 | Wanda Jean Allen; January 11, 2001 | Succeeded by Floyd Medlock January 16, 2001 |
Executions carried out in the United States
| Preceded by Robert Dewey Glock II – Florida January 11, 2001 | Wanda Jean Allen – Oklahoma; January 11, 2001 | Succeeded by Floyd Medlock – Oklahoma January 16, 2001 |
Women executed in the United States
| Preceded by Christina Marie Riggs – Arkansas May 2, 2000 | Wanda Jean Allen – Oklahoma; January 11, 2001 | Succeeded by Marilyn Kay Plantz – Oklahoma May 1, 2001 |
