= Lois Nadean Smith =

American woman executed in 2001

- Born: Lois Nadean Dodd; September 12, 1940
- Died: December 4, 2001 (aged 61); Oklahoma State Penitentiary, Oklahoma, US
- Status: Executed by lethal injection
- Conviction: First-degree murder
- Penalty: Death (December 29, 1982)
- Accomplices: Greg Smith, Teresa Baker

Details
- Victims: 1
- Date: 4 July 1982
- Location: Gans, Oklahoma

Lois Nadean Smith (September 12, 1940 – December 4, 2001) was an American woman convicted of first-degree murder of her son's ex-girlfriend Cindy Baillie. She was also known as "Mean Nadean" and was the third woman executed in Oklahoma state history.

== Crime ==
The victim, 20-year-old Cindy Baillie, was the ex-girlfriend of Smith's son Greg. On July 4, 1982, Smith, along with her son and associate Teresa Baker, picked Baillie up from a motel in Tahlequah to interrogate her, confronting her about rumors that Baillie threatened to have her son killed. Baillie denied making any arrangements to kill Greg, so Smith choked and stabbed Baillie in the throat with a knife from Baillie's purse. The group drove to Smith's ex-husband's house, where Smith forced Baillie into a recliner and shot her with a pistol several times until she fell from the chair. While Greg reloaded the gun, Smith jumped on top of Baillie's neck while laughing; afterwards, she shot Baillie 4 more times. In total, Baillie suffered five gunshot wounds to the chest, two to the head, and one to the back.

Smith was charged with first-degree murder in the Sequoyah County, as was her son, although their cases were severed for trial. Trial commenced on December 6, 1982, where Smith's lawyers argued that Smith was only trying to protect her son and was under the influence during the incident. The jury found her guilty of first-degree murder and sentenced her to death on December 29. On October 28, 1986, Smith appealed her conviction, but it was affirmed by the Oklahoma Court of Criminal Appeals. Her son Greg was also convicted of first-degree murder but was given a life sentence.

== Execution ==
Smith was executed by lethal injection by the state of Oklahoma on December 4, 2001, at Oklahoma State Penitentiary in McAlester, Oklahoma. While awaiting execution, Smith was housed at the Mabel Bassett Correctional Center.

For her last meal, served the day before her execution, Smith requested barbecue ribs, onion rings, strawberry banana cake, and cherry lemonade. As her last words, Smith thanked her attorneys and said, "To the families, I want to say I'm sorry for the pain and loss I've caused you. I ask that you forgive me. You must forgive to be forgiven... To live is Christ, to die is gain. Thank you, Jesus." She mouthed, "Thank you, Jesus," until she was pronounced dead at 9:13 pm, two minutes after receiving a lethal injection. Cindy Baillie's daughter, Brandy Fields, and her family witnessed the execution.

== See also ==
- Capital punishment in Oklahoma
- Capital punishment in the United States
- List of people executed in Oklahoma
- List of people executed in the United States in 2001
- List of women executed in the United States since 1976

Executions carried out in Oklahoma
Preceded by Alvie Hale Jr. October 18, 2001	Lois Nadean Smith; December 4, 2001	Succeeded by Sahib Lateef Al-Mosawi December 6, 2001
Executions carried out in the United States
Preceded by John Rose – North Carolina November 30, 2001	Lois Nadean Smith – Oklahoma; December 4, 2001	Succeeded by Sahib Lateef Al-Mosawi – Oklahoma December 6, 2001
Women executed in the United States
Preceded by Marilyn Kay Plantz – Oklahoma May 1, 2001	Lois Nadean Smith – Oklahoma; December 4, 2001	Succeeded by Lynda Lyon Block – Alabama May 10, 2002
