= Paula Angel =

American legally executed convicted murderer (1842–1861)

- Born: c. 1842; Las Vegas, New Mexico
- Died: April 26, 1861 (aged 19); Las Vegas, New Mexico
- Status: Executed by hanging
- Conviction: First degree murder
- Penalty: Death

Paula Angel (c. 1842 – April 26, 1861) was an American woman executed for the murder of her lover. She was hanged from a cottonwood tree in Las Vegas, New Mexico, following a brief and somewhat abnormal legal process. She is the only woman to have been legally executed in New Mexico since its incorporation into the United States.

== Background and trial ==
Angel was about 19 years old at the time of her death, and belonged to a "prominent" family in Las Vegas, New Mexico Territory. In March 1861, she was arrested and charged with first-degree murder over the death of her lover, Miguel Martin, who was a married father of five and also came from a prominent family. According to the case put forward by the prosecution, Angel was upset because Martin had told her he was going to end their affair, so she lured him to one final meeting and then stabbed him in the back with a knife she had concealed under her shawl.

The presiding judge, Kirby Benedict, instructed the jury to only consider the charge of first-degree murder; they were prohibited from finding her guilty of a non-capital offence (murder of a lesser degree or manslaughter). Angel pled not guilty, on the grounds that her actions were a crime of passion and thus not premeditated. The jury disagreed with that line of reasoning, finding her guilty, and Benedict then sentenced her to death, the only available sentence under territorial law at that time. A short time later, Angel was granted the right to appeal to the New Mexico Supreme Court. However, no concurrent stay of execution was granted, an action which has been criticised as lacking due process by later writers. Angel's lawyer tried unsuccessfully to delay her execution.

== Execution ==
Angel was hanged in Las Vegas on the morning of April 26. No gallows were available, so she was instead tied to a cottonwood tree and placed on a wagon attached to a team of horses. Antonio Abad Herrera, the county sheriff and executioner, forgot to tie her arms, so when the wagon began moving she was able to grab hold of the noose. Herrera attempted to pull her downward, but the crowd prevented him from doing so and cut her free. There was potential for a riot, as some in the crowd believed that she was entitled to be released, but order was maintained and the second attempt was successful.

== Legacy ==
The case of Paula Angel received little contemporary attention due to the ongoing American Civil War. Angel was virtually forgotten until 1961, when an article was published in The Santa Fe New Mexican to commemorate the 100th anniversary of her execution. Some sources have described Angel as the only woman to have been legally executed in New Mexico. This is in fact only true of New Mexico as a part of the United States – two Puebloan women had been hanged in Santa Fe in 1779, under Spanish colonial rule. Jenn Shapland has noted that her execution took place at a time of lynchings of people of colour, both women and men.

Until 2008, there was no direct evidence that an execution had even been carried out, only folk and oral traditions. Historian Robert Tórrez found the original warrant for Angel's execution in the Huntington Library of California, but it initially appeared to contain nothing to suggest the sentence had been carried out. However, it was subsequently determined that the microfilm of the warrant only included one side. When the original document was examined, Sheriff Herrera's handwritten confirmation of execution was found on the reverse.

Angel's case was featured in an episode of Deadly Women.
