= Terry D. Clark =

American murderer (1956–2001)

- Born: Terry Douglas Clark; May 17, 1956; Roswell, New Mexico, U.S.
- Died: November 6, 2001 (aged 45); Penitentiary of New Mexico, Santa Fe, New Mexico, U.S.
- Cause of death: Execution by lethal injection
- Convictions: First degree murder Kidnapping (2 counts); Criminal sexual penetration
- Penalty: Death

Details
- Victims: Dena Lynn Gore, 9
- Date: July 17, 1986
- Country: United States
- State: New Mexico
- Location: Chaves County

Terry Douglas Clark (May 17, 1956 – November 6, 2001) was an American murderer convicted of the murder of nine-year-old Dena Lynn Gore. He was executed by the state of New Mexico by means of lethal injection. He was the first and only person to be executed in New Mexico between the reinstatement of the death penalty in 1976 and its subsequent abolition within New Mexico in 2009. The previous execution in New Mexico had been the gas chamber death of David Cooper Nelson on August 11, 1960.

== Early life ==
Clark was born on May 17, 1956, in Roswell, New Mexico. His childhood was described as ordinary, until his junior year in high school, when he began drinking and smoking marijuana. He was suspended from Roswell High School for truancy, before dropping out altogether. Around that same time, he began taking methamphetamine, LSD, heroin, and cocaine. He later earned a GED and went to work for a bus building company, but was fired from the job within a year. He then went to work for a construction company before joining the Navy at the age of twenty.

== Crimes ==
In 1986, Clark was convicted of kidnapping and raping a 6-year-old girl from Roswell, New Mexico, and sentenced to 24 years in prison. Pending appeals in that case, he was released on bond. While he was out on bond in that case, 9-year-old Dena Lynn Gore of Artesia, New Mexico, was raped and killed on July 17, 1986. Gore's bound and decomposing body was found partially buried on a nearby ranch on July 22, 1986. Gore had been shot three times in the back of her head. A few days later, Clark was taken into custody and he confessed to a minister while in jail.

== Trial and appeals ==
In 1986, public defenders Sheila Lewis and Steve Aarons were assigned to represent Clark. In a rare legal maneuver, Clark pleaded guilty to first-degree murder in hopes of being sentenced before Governor Toney Anaya completed his term of office. However, District Judge Stanley F. Frost refused to hold a sentencing hearing before Anaya's last day in office. As a result, Clark was not among the five men on death row whose death sentences were commuted by Anaya to life in prison. The following year, a jury in Tucumcari, New Mexico, returned with a death sentence against Clark. In 1994, the New Mexico Supreme Court overturned that sentence, found reversible error related to the first jury's understanding of the meaning of life in prison, and mandated a new sentencing hearing.

In 1996, prominent New Mexico capital defense lawyer Gary Mitchell represented Clark at his retrial in Silver City, New Mexico. Aarons and Anaya were among dozens of witnesses who testified on behalf of Clark. Anaya explained why he would have commuted Clark's sentence if he had the legal authority to do so. The second jury also returned a death sentence.

== Execution ==
Clark waived his appeals in 1999 and was executed on November 6, 2001. Six officers were assigned to 24 hour "death watch" shifts. During these final two weeks, Clark received visits from attorneys, clergy, and his girlfriend. He requested Long John Silver's fish and shrimp as his last meal; he did not want dessert. At exactly 7:00 p.m. on November 6, 2001, he was escorted from his cell to the death chamber, visibly shaken and mildly sobbing. The team assisted him as his whole body was trembling. He was strapped down to the table and an I.V. was inserted. The warden and clergy had brief words with him. Warden Tim LeMaster read the death warrant and asked Clark if he had any last words, to which he replied, "15 minutes". The curtains were opened for the witnesses (20 as per state law) and the drugs were injected. Clark was pronounced dead eight minutes later. The witnesses were escorted out of the facility and the body released to the medical examiner. This made him the first inmate in New Mexico to be executed in 41 years and the only one to be executed by lethal injection.

On March 18, 2009, Governor Bill Richardson signed a death penalty abolition bill into law. He had been a supporter of capital punishment for years, but said that he lacked confidence in the current system to make the final decision on who lives and who dies.

== See also ==
- Capital punishment in New Mexico
- Capital punishment in the United States
- List of most recent executions by jurisdiction
- List of people executed in New Mexico
- List of people executed in the United States in 2001
- Volunteer (capital punishment)

Executions carried out in New Mexico
Preceded by David Cooper Nelson January 8, 1960	Terry Douglas Clark; November 6, 2001	Succeeded by none
Executions carried out in the United States
Preceded by José Martinez High – Georgia November 6, 2001	Terry Douglas Clark – New Mexico; November 6, 2001	Succeeded by Jeffery Eugene Tucker – Texas November 14, 2001
