= Marilyn Kay Plantz =

American woman executed in 2001

- Born: Marilyn Kay Sellers; October 19, 1960
- Died: May 1, 2001 (aged 40); Oklahoma State Penitentiary, Oklahoma, US
- Occupation: Sunday school teacher
- Children: 2
- Status: Executed by lethal injection
- Motive: Life insurance benefits
- Convictions: First-degree murder, third-degree arson, solicitation to commit murder, and conspiracy to commit murder
- Penalty: Death
- Accomplices: William Bryson, Clinton McKimble

Details
- Victims: 1
- Date: August 26, 1988
- State: Oklahoma

Marilyn Kay Plantz (October 19, 1960 – May 1, 2001) was an American woman convicted of the contract killing of her husband James Earl "Jim" Plantz (March 15, 1955 – August 26, 1988) in 1988 for a $300,000 life insurance policy. Plantz was the second woman executed in Oklahoma state history.

== Background ==
Marilyn and Jim Plantz lived in Midwest City, Oklahoma, where Jim worked as a newspaper pressman at the Oklahoma Publishing Company and Plantz worked as a Sunday school teacher. They had two children together: Trina and Christopher Plantz, aged 9 and 6 at the time of the murder.

In 1987 or 1988, Plantz met 16-year-old William Clifford Bryson. That spring, Plantz and Bryson became sexually and romantically involved. Plantz would entertain Bryson by allowing him to drive her car, hosting him at her house, and providing him with money to buy alcohol or crack cocaine. They also met accomplice Clinton Eugene McKimble, who was also a teenager at the time.

Plantz told Bryson and McKimble that her husband was abusive and she wanted him killed. At the time, Jim Plantz had a life insurance policy and was insured for $299,000. She suggested they ambush him when he got home from work, shoot him in his car, or push him off of a boat while fishing. She offered McKimble $45,000 for his assistance in the murder-for-hire plot.

The first two attempts to carry out the killing were unsuccessful. On August 17, 1988, Bryson, McKimble, and associate Rory Jenkins stole a car to follow Jim home and run him off of the road; however, Jim took an unexpected route home and they lost track of his vehicle. Subsequently, Plantz gave Bryson a gun for the purpose of killing Jim, but he pawned it. They offered associate Roderick Farris $7,000 to help with the plot, and when he refused, offered him $40,000 and then $10,000. Distraught due to being physically assaulted by Jim, Plantz spoke with Farris about the plot. Farris asked Bryson why she could not just divorce Jim, to which he explained she wanted the insurance money. However, Farris, Bryson, and McKimble hung around the Plantz home awaiting Jim to "take him out" but he did not appear, and Farris was later arrested for unrelated charges and rendered unable to help further with the scheme.

== Crime ==
On August 25, 1988, Plantz quit her job. Bryson picked her up from work, and she bought crack cocaine and beer for Bryson and McKimble and returned to their home once Jim had left for work. Bryson and McKimble hid in the kitchen with the 6-year-old son's baseball bats, supplied by Plantz.

In the early morning of August 26, Jim returned to their Midwest City home around 4 am while carrying a bag of groceries. Bryson and McKimble jumped Jim and beat him with the bats while Plantz waited in the bedroom; the Plantz' children were asleep in their room. McKimble and Bryson took Jim outside as he moaned and put him in his pickup truck. She complained that because Jim's head was "busted open" it would not look like an accident, and then told both to burn him. Bryson drove the truck to a secluded location in Jim's work route while McKimble followed; they moved still-alive Jim behind the steering wheel, doused him and the pickup in gasoline, and threw a match inside. As they drove away, the pair saw Jim sit up.

McKimble and Bryson returned to the Plantz family home and helped Plantz clean the blood from the home and the bats. Both changed into Jim's clothes and discarded their bloodstained clothes in the nearby river. Plantz bought a new rug to cover up the bloodstained floor.

At 5:15 am, the burnt remains of Jim's body were discovered in the destroyed truck with the driver's side door open. In the few days after the murder, Bryson and McKimble told multiple friends about the murder plot, and Bryson told friends he planned to move and buy a home with Plantz.

== Conviction ==
Plantz was convicted of first-degree murder, third-degree arson, solicitation to commit murder, and conspiracy to commit murder. McKimble and Bryson were also charged with first-degree murder, although McKimble pled guilty in exchange for a life sentence while Bryson also received the death penalty.

Co-defendant Bryson was executed on June 15, 2000.

Plantz appealed her conviction, and her attorneys attempted to introduce further evidence of her dependent personality disorder and low IQ, but were unsuccessful. She petitioned to the U. S. Supreme Court for a writ of certiorari, which was denied on February 21, 1995. After another appeal, she petitioned for certiorari a second time but it was also denied on February 26, 2001, just a few months before her execution. Plantz also attempted a bid for clemency from the Oklahoma Pardon and Parole Board, but they voted unanimously against it on April 17, 2001, two weeks before her execution.

== Execution ==
Plantz was executed on May 1, 2001, by the state of Oklahoma at Oklahoma State Penitentiary in McAlester, Oklahoma.

While on death row, Plantz converted to Christianity. For her last meal, which was served the day prior, she requested two cans of Coke, chicken taco salad, Mexican pizza, two enchiritos, two chicken soft tacos, cinnamon twists, and a piece of pecan pie.

In her final statement, Plantz said, "I want to tell of my family that I love them very much, especially Trina and Chris... What God has given me is love and I have overcome the world. And I just want y'all to know that nothing, absolutely nothing, can separate us from the love of God. And if y'all want to see me again, you must be born again." Plantz was pronounced dead at 9:11 pm on May 1 at age 40. Jim Plantz' family members witnessed the execution on his behalf.

== See also ==
- Capital punishment in Oklahoma
- Capital punishment in the United States
- List of people executed in Oklahoma
- List of people executed in the United States in 2001
- List of women executed in the United States since 1976

Executions carried out in Oklahoma
Preceded by Robert Clayton March 27, 2001	Marilyn Kay Plantz; May 1, 2001	Succeeded by Terrance James May 22, 2001
Executions carried out in the United States
Preceded by David Dawson – Delaware April 26, 2001	Marilyn Kay Plantz – Oklahoma; May 1, 2001	Succeeded by Clay King Smith – Arkansas May 8, 2001
Women executed in the United States
Preceded by Wanda Jean Allen – Oklahoma January 11, 2001	Marilyn Kay Plantz – Oklahoma; May 1, 2001	Succeeded by Lois Nadean Smith – Oklahoma December 4, 2001
