= Capital punishment in New Mexico =

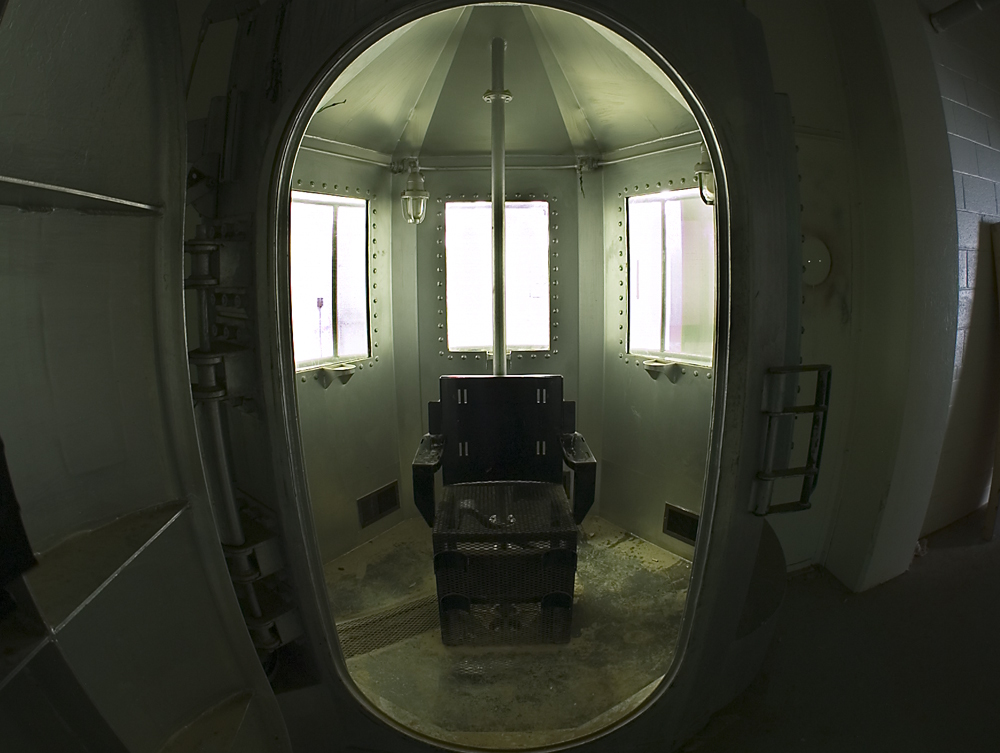
The gas chamber at the Penitentiary of New Mexico

Capital punishment was abolished in the U.S. state of New Mexico in 2009.

The law replaced the death penalty for the most serious crimes with life imprisonment and life imprisonment without the possibility of parole. This makes New Mexico the fifteenth state in the U.S. to abolish capital punishment.

Since the death penalty was reinstated by the U.S. Supreme Court in 1976 (in the case of Gregg v. Georgia), only one person has been executed in New Mexico. This was Terry Clark, who was put to death in 2001, by lethal injection, for the murder of a child. The penalty was abolished by House Bill 2085, which was signed by Governor Bill Richardson on March 18, 2009 and came into force on July 1 of that year. Section 6 of the law states, "The provisions of this act apply to crimes committed on or after July 1, 2009".

== Fate of remaining offenders still on death row ==
Because the legislation is not retroactive, it is still possible for convicts to be executed for crimes committed before July 1, 2009. For ten years after abolition, there were two men on death row in New Mexico whose crimes and trials took place before then:

- Robert Ray Fry, bludgeoning and stabbing of a Shiprock woman in 2000 (he has also three other murder convictions).
- Timothy Allen, for the kidnapping, rape, and murder by strangulation of a teenage girl in 1994

Both Allen and Fry filed petitions for writ of habeas corpus asserting that the death sentences in their cases are unconstitutional, both generally, and as applied to them individually. On June 28, 2019, their death sentences were overturned by the New Mexico Supreme Court, which in a split decision ruled that their sentences were disproportionate to their crimes. This effectively closes down New Mexico's death row unless another prisoner were to be tried, convicted and condemned for a homicide that occurred prior to 2009.

Only one death penalty trial has taken place since 2009 for crimes that were committed beforehand, that of Michael Astorga, and because the jurors in that case were unable to agree on a death sentence, he received life imprisonment.

== Attempts at reinstatement ==
Repeal the repeal is the name of a campaign pushed by Bernalillo County Sheriff Darren White to reinstate the death penalty in the state of New Mexico following the repeal of capital punishment by the state legislature, signed into law by Governor Bill Richardson on March 18, 2009.

RepealTheRepeal is a non-profit, non-partisan organization whose goal is reinstating the death penalty in New Mexico for "the most heinous crimes". RTR will try to achieve this goal through a multi-pronged approach.

RepealTheRepeal opened a website and distributed a movie in favor of reinstating the death penalty.

This campaign had at least three specified objectives:

- "Aggressively combat the misinformation campaign waged by the radical opponents of the death penalty and educate the public on the issue and the circumstances surrounding its repeal";
- Begin a petition drive in order to give voters the opportunity to "repeal the repeal" of the death penalty at the ballot box, pursuant to the New Mexico Constitution;
- Urge voters to support candidates for the legislature and state office who will vote to reinstate the death penalty in New Mexico.

In an interview on the Santa Fe Reporter, Darren White said he was opposed to the death penalty for crimes other than murder.

According to Public Opinion Strategies in 2011, 67% of the voters in New Mexico supported capital punishment for "the most heinous murders".

== Subsequent developments ==
In March 2011, two attempts to reinstate capital punishment failed in the New Mexico legislature. One bill would have reinstated the death penalty by statute; the other proposed an amendment to the state constitution which would have been put to New Mexico voters in 2012. Both proposals were voted down by a state House committee.

Republican Governor Susana Martinez announced on August 17, 2016, that she will introduce legislation to reinstate the death penalty in the 2017 legislative session. On October 14, 2016, the New Mexico House of Representatives approved the bill on a 36-30 vote. The bill provided the death penalty for only three kinds of murder: child murder, murder of an on-duty police officer, and murder of a prison employee by an inmate. The bill died in the Democratic controlled New Mexico Senate.

== See also ==
- Capital punishment in the United States
- Crime in New Mexico
- List of death row inmates in the United States § New Mexico
- List of people executed in New Mexico
- Paula Angel, only woman to be executed in post-colonial New Mexico
