= William Smith (murderer) =

American criminal

- Mugshot of Smith
- Born: October 28, 1957; Ohio, U.S.
- Died: March 8, 2005 (aged 47); Southern Ohio Correctional Facility, Ohio, U.S.
- Status: Executed by lethal injection
- Convictions: Aggravated murder Rape
- Penalty: Death (April 14, 1988)

William Henry Smith (October 28, 1957 – March 8, 2005) was executed by the state of Ohio for the rape and murder of 47-year-old Mary Virginia Bradford of Cincinnati, Ohio, that occurred on September 26, 1987.

Smith and Bradford were seen speaking and dancing together at a local bar where they were both regulars. They both left the bar at different times on the night of September 26. On the following day, Bradford's boyfriend became concerned because he had not seen her that day. He entered her unlocked apartment and found Bradford's body, nude from the waist down, on the bed. Missing from the apartment were Bradford's two television sets and her stereo components.

During the autopsy the coroner located ten stab wounds in her neck and chest. Of these wounds, one penetrated her right lung, two penetrated the liver, and two penetrated the heart. The coroner concluded that although five of the wounds could ultimately have been fatal, the immediate cause of death was the two heart wounds, one in the right atrium and the other in the right ventricle. The autopsy also indicated that despite Bradford having engaged in intercourse before her death, the sex was non-consensual.

When the police executed a search warrant at the residence of Smith's mother, they recovered both television sets, bloody clothing and bloody shoes. Analysis of the blood on the clothing yielded a sample that matched Bradford's blood type.

Smith subsequently confessed to the crime, telling police officers that he had gone to Bradford's apartment sometime after leaving the tavern. When he left her apartment, he remembered that he had forgotten his cigarettes and $2,500 worth of cocaine. Upon his return to the apartment, Bradford told him that she did not have the cocaine, and after further discussion about restitution, she offered to reimburse Smith by having sexual relations with him. After engaging in sexual intercourse, the two argued in the living room, and according to Smith, Bradford threatened him with a kitchen knife. He said that he took the knife from Bradford and stabbed her in the neck and stomach, causing her to fall back into a living room chair, and that the two engaged in intercourse for a second time after Bradford retreated to the bedroom and fell on her bed. Smith admitted that he stole two televisions and the stereo components from Bradford's apartment, but he claimed that they belonged to him. He ended his account of this incident by telling the police that he dropped the knife in a river on the way to his mother's residence.

On October 21, 1987, Smith was indicted for the crimes that resulted in Mary Bradford's death. He entered a plea of not guilty to the four counts and the accompanying specifications. A separate plea of not guilty by reason of insanity was later withdrawn in open court. After Smith waived a jury trial, a three-judge panel heard the evidence and found Smith guilty of all counts and specifications on April 6, 1988. Five days after the guilt phase of the trial, the penalty phase commenced, and on April 14, 1988, the three-judge panel sentenced Smith to death.

Smith spent 16 years, 10 months, and 22 days on death row before he was executed by lethal injection.

== See also ==
- Capital punishment in Ohio
- Capital punishment in the United States
- List of people executed in Ohio
- List of people executed in the United States in 2005

== General references ==
- Clark Prosecutor
- Smith v. Anderson, 104 F. Supp. 2d 773 (2000)
- State v. Smith, 1990 Ohio App. LEXIS 2217
- Smith v. Mitchell, 348 F.3d 177 (2003)
- 2005 Capital Crimes Report (pdf) Office of the Ohio Attorney General.

Executions carried out in Ohio
Preceded by Adremy Dennis October 13, 2004	William Smith; March 8, 2005	Succeeded by Herman Ashworth September 27, 2005
Executions carried out in the United States
Preceded by Stephen Anthony Mobley – Georgia March 1, 2005	William Smith – Ohio; March 8, 2005	Succeeded by George Hopper – Texas March 8, 2005
