= Getsy =

Getsy is a surname. Notable people with the surname include:

- Jason Getsy (1975-2009), American murderer
- Luke Getsy (born 1984), American football player and coach
