= Adremy Dennis =

American murderer (1976–2004)

- Born: January 23, 1976; Ohio, U.S.
- Died: October 13, 2004 (aged 28); Southern Ohio Correctional Facility, Ohio, U.S.
- Status: Executed by lethal injection
- Convictions: Aggravated murder Attempted aggravated murder Aggravated robbery (2 counts); Unlawful possession of dangerous ordnance
- Penalty: Death (February 1995)

Adremy Dennis (January 23, 1976 – October 13, 2004) was a convicted murderer executed by Ohio. He was found guilty of the 1994 murder of Akron, Ohio, resident Kurt Kyle. Dennis was the 15th person executed by the state since it reinstated the death penalty in 1981.

Late on June 4, 1994, and in the early morning hours of June 5, Dennis and Leroy "Lavar" Anderson decided to go to a bar and "meet some chicks." Anderson spoke of "robbing somebody," and the pair armed themselves with weapons: Dennis with a sawed-off shotgun and Anderson with a .25 caliber handgun.

That same night, 29-year-old Kurt Kyle had raced at Barberton Speedway and afterwards hosted several friends and family members at his home for a cookout and socializing. Kyle walked guest Martin Eberhart to his car, where the two continued conversing. About three minutes later, two men approached them in the driveway, out of the view of Kyle's other guests. The man Eberhart identified as Anderson was wearing a green and orange Miami Hurricanes Starter jacket, and demanded money while pointing a gun at Eberhart's neck. Eberhart slowly reached under the car seat for his wallet and handed $15 to Anderson.

At that time, Dennis, whom Eberhart described as wearing a long, three-quarter-length dark coat, asked Kyle for money. However, Kyle searched through his pockets and told Dennis that he had no money with him. Dennis then pulled out a sawed-off shotgun and shot Kyle in the head at point-blank range. Kyle died instantly of hypovolemic shock (loss of blood) due to a gunshot wound that severed both carotid arteries. According to Eberhart, the two assailants ran away together "sprinting very fast."

A few days after the murder, Akron police received an anonymous phone call stating that someone at a home in the 300 block of Grand Avenue in Akron knew about the homicide that past weekend. Two detectives went to the address and met the homeowner, who gave them permission to look around the house and to speak with her son, 17-year-old Lavar Anderson. When the detectives went down to the basement, they noticed a Miami Hurricanes jacket and a long, dark overcoat hanging up in the far corner on a bedrail. At that time, they took Anderson into custody, and he provided detectives information about the location of the murder weapon. After procuring a search warrant, police seized several items from Morgan's basement, including the two coats, a .25 caliber pearl handle handgun, a 20 gauge sawed-off shotgun, and seven shotgun shells.

Shortly afterward, police received another tip about the whereabouts of Adremy Dennis. He was subsequently arrested. In his fourth statement to detectives, Dennis admitted that he and Anderson had planned some robberies that night and admitted holding up Eberhart and Kyle. However, while Dennis admitted aiming the sawed-off shotgun at Kyle, he also claimed the gun went off accidentally. Dennis agreed to allow detectives to tape his statement.

In his taped statement, Dennis said that he and Anderson had smoked marijuana and then drank at a bar before the robberies and murder. While Dennis admitted he fired the sawed-off shotgun three times that night, he asserted that each shot was accidental and that he "could barely focus" when they came upon Kyle and Eberhart.

When speaking on death row and before the Board of Pardons and Paroles, Dennis contended that his victim shared responsibility for his death because he did not cooperate with Dennis's demands. "I ain't saying it's all his fault, but why did he move?" Dennis said from death row. "Every day I think about that. It ain't 'Why did you kill that man?' It's 'Why did you move?'"

Dennis was indicted for murder and attempted murder (for a previous robbery attempt that night) on June 21, 1994, and convicted of aggravated murder for the slaying of Kyle. He spent 9 years and 8 months on death row.

Anderson, who was 17 at the time of the killings, was sentenced to 40 years to life in prison. Ohio law prohibits sentencing defendants younger than 18 to death; had Dennis committed his crimes five months earlier, he would have been ineligible to receive a death sentence.

In 2021, Anderson's sentence was reduced to 25 years to life under a law restricting life sentences for juveniles in Ohio. He was granted parole in August 2022, and released from prison that October.

== See also ==
- Capital punishment in Ohio
- Capital punishment in the United States
- List of people executed in Ohio
- List of people executed in the United States in 2004

== General references ==
- Clark Prosecutor
- 2005 Capital Crimes Report (pdf) Office of the Ohio Attorney General.
- Dennis v. Mitchell, 354 F.3d 511 (2003)
- Dennis v. Mitchell, 68 F. Supp. 2d 863, 1999 U.S. Dist. LEXIS 15339 (N.D. Ohio, 1999)
- "Akron man executed for 1994 shotgun slaying," The Associated Press, October 14, 2004.

Executions carried out in Ohio
Preceded by Scott Andrew Mink July 20, 2004	Adremy Dennis; October 13, 2004	Succeeded by William Smith March 8, 2005
Executions carried out in the United States
Preceded by Donald Aldrich – Texas October 12, 2004	Adremy Dennis – Ohio; October 13, 2004	Succeeded by Ricky Morrow – Texas October 20, 2004
