= Glenn Lee Benner II =

American convicted of murder and executed by lethal injection

- Mugshot of Glenn Lee Benner II
- Born: September 24, 1962; Akron, Ohio, U.S.
- Died: February 7, 2006 (aged 43); Southern Ohio Correctional Facility, Ohio, U.S.
- Status: Executed by lethal injection
- Convictions: Aggravated murder (2 counts); Attempted aggravated murder; Kidnapping (3 counts); Abduction; Rape (6 counts); Attempted rape; Gross sexual imposition; Aggravated burglary
- Penalty: Death (May 14, 1986)

Details
- Victims: 2
- Date: August 6, 1985; January 2, 1986
- Country: United States
- State: Ohio

Glenn Lee Benner II (September 24, 1962 – February 7, 2006) was an American convicted murderer, executed by the State of Ohio.

== Murders ==
On August 6, 1985, Benner abducted 26-year-old Cynthia Sedgwick in the woods surrounding the Blossom Music Center in Summit County, where they both attended a concert. Benner raped Sedgwick and choked her to death.

On January 2, 1986, Benner kidnapped an acquaintance, 21-year-old Trina Bowser, in Akron and raped and killed her. DNA testing, conducted during federal appeals in 2003, identified Benner as the source of semen in Bowser's assault.

== Trial and execution ==
On May 14, 1986, Benner was convicted for kidnapping, rape, and aggravated murder. He was also convicted for the attempted murders and rapes of two other women on two separate occasions.

He spent 19 years, eight months, and 24 days on death row before being executed by lethal injection on February 7, 2006.

Benner's last meal consisted of four bacon cheeseburgers on toasted buns, with green peppers, tomatoes, pickles, ketchup, mustard and mayonnaise; a baked potato with butter and sour cream; french fries; onion rings; macaroni and cheese; chef salad with creamy Italian dressing; blueberry pie with chocolate ice cream; iced tea; and a Coke.

Benner's last words were "I just need you to give me two seconds. I have been going over and over in my head trying to think of the words I can say to you that would ease the unimaginable pain that you have been going through for 20 years because of my actions. I'm sorry. Trina and Cynthia were beautiful girls who didn't deserve what I did to them. They are in a better place. Words seem so futile. All I can say is I'm sorry. May God give you peace."

== See also ==
- List of people executed in Ohio
- List of people executed in the United States in 2006

== General references ==
- Clark Prosecutor

Executions carried out in Ohio
Preceded by John R. Hicks November 29, 2005	Glenn Lee Benner II; February 7, 2006	Succeeded by Joseph Lewis Clark May 2, 2006
Executions carried out in the United States
Preceded by Jaime Elizalde Jr. – Texas January 31, 2006	Glenn Lee Benner II – Ohio; February 7, 2006	Succeeded by Robert Neville Jr. – Texas February 8, 2006
