= List of people executed in the United States in 2009 =

Fifty-two people were executed in the United States in 2009. Twenty-four of them were in the state of Texas. One (Larry Bill Elliott) was executed via electrocution. One notable execution was of convicted murderer John Allen Muhammad, who was responsible for carrying out the D.C. sniper attacks in 2002.

== List of people executed in the United States in 2009 ==
No.	Date of execution	Name	Age of person			Gender	Ethnicity	State	Method	Ref.
No.	Date of execution	Name	At execution	At offense	Age difference	Gender	Ethnicity	State	Method	Ref.
1	January 14, 2009	Curtis Moore	40	27	13	Male	Black	Texas	Lethal injection	
2	January 15, 2009	James Harvey Callahan	62	35	27	Male	White	Alabama	Lethal injection	
3	January 21, 2009	Frank Moore	49	34	15	Male	Black	Texas	Lethal injection	
4	January 22, 2009	Darwin Demond Brown	32	18	14	Male	Black	Oklahoma	Lethal injection	
5	January 22, 2009	Reginald W. Perkins	53	45	8	Male	Black	Texas	Lethal injection	
6	January 28, 2009	Virgil Euristi Martinez	41	28	13	Male	Hispanic	Texas	Lethal injection	
7	January 29, 2009	Ricardo Samaneigo Ortiz	46	34	12	Male	Hispanic	Texas	Lethal injection	
8	February 4, 2009	Steve Morris Henley	55	31	24	Male	White	Tennessee	Lethal injection	
9	February 4, 2009	David Martinez	36	22	14	Male	Hispanic	Texas	Lethal injection	
10	February 10, 2009	Dale Devon Scheanette	35	23	12	Male	Black	Texas	Lethal injection	
11	February 11, 2009	Wayne Tompkins	51	26	25	Male	White	Florida	Lethal injection	
12	February 12, 2009	Danny Joe Bradley	49	23	26	Male	White	Alabama	Lethal injection	
13	February 12, 2009	Johnny Ray Johnson	51	37	14	Male	Black	Texas	Lethal injection	
14	February 19, 2009	Edward Nathaniel Bell	44	35	9	Male	Black	Virginia	Lethal injection	
15	February 20, 2009	Luke Arthur Williams III	56	38	18	Male	White	South Carolina	Lethal injection	
16	March 3, 2009	Willie Earl Pondexter Jr.	34	19	15	Male	Black	Texas	Lethal injection	
17	March 4, 2009	Kenneth Wayne Morris	38	20	18	Male	Black	Texas	Lethal injection	
18	March 10, 2009	James Edward Martinez	34	26	8	Male	Hispanic	Texas	Lethal injection	
19	March 10, 2009	Robert L. Newland	65	43	22	Male	White	Georgia	Lethal injection	
20	March 11, 2009	Luis Cervantes Salazar	38	27	11	Male	Hispanic	Texas	Lethal injection	
21	April 15, 2009	Michael Flores Rosales	35	23	12	Male	Hispanic	Texas	Lethal injection	
22	April 16, 2009	Jimmy Lee Dill	49	27	22	Male	Black	Alabama	Lethal injection	
23	April 29, 2009	William Mark Mize	52	38	14	Male	White	Georgia	Lethal injection	
24	April 30, 2009	Derrick Lamone Johnson	28	18	10	Male	Black	Texas	Lethal injection	
25	May 8, 2009	Thomas Treshawn Ivey	34	18	16	Male	Black	South Carolina	Lethal injection	
26	May 14, 2009	Willie McNair	44	25	19	Male	Black	Alabama	Lethal injection	
27	May 14, 2009	Donald Lee Gilson	48	34	14	Male	White	Oklahoma	Lethal injection	
28	May 19, 2009	Michael Lynn Riley	51	27	24	Male	Black	Texas	Lethal injection	
29	May 20, 2009	Dennis James Skillicorn	49	34	15	Male	White	Missouri	Lethal injection	
30	June 2, 2009	Terry Lee Hankins	34	26	8	Male	White	Texas	Lethal injection	
31	June 3, 2009	Daniel E. Wilson	39	21	18	Male	White	Ohio	Lethal injection	
32	June 11, 2009	Jack Harrison Trawick	62	45	17	Male	White	Alabama	Lethal injection	
33	July 9, 2009	Michael Paul Delozier	32	19	13	Male	White	Oklahoma	Lethal injection	
34	July 14, 2009	John Joseph Fautenberry	46	27	19	Male	White	Ohio	Lethal injection	
35	July 21, 2009	Marvallous Matthew Keene	36	19	17	Male	Black	Ohio	Lethal injection	
36	August 18, 2009	Jason Labuda Getsy	33	19	14	Male	White	Ohio	Lethal injection	
37	August 19, 2009	John Richard Marek	47	21	26	Male	White	Florida	Lethal injection	
38	September 16, 2009	Stephen Lindsey Moody	52	34	18	Male	White	Texas	Lethal injection	
39	September 22, 2009	Christopher Bernard Coleman	37	23	14	Male	Black	Texas	Lethal injection	
40	October 8, 2009	Max Landon Payne	38	21	17	Male	White	Alabama	Lethal injection	
41	October 20, 2009	Mark Howard McClain	42	27	15	Male	White	Georgia	Lethal injection	
42	October 27, 2009	Reginald Winthrop Blanton	28	18	10	Male	Black	Texas	Lethal injection	
43	November 5, 2009	Khristian Phillip Oliver	32	20	12	Male	White	Texas	Lethal injection	
44	November 10, 2009	Yosvanis Valle	34	23	11	Male	Hispanic	Texas	Lethal injection	
45	November 10, 2009	John Allen Muhammad	48	41	7	Male	Black	Virginia	Lethal injection	
46	November 17, 2009	Larry Bill Elliott	60	51	9	Male	White	Virginia	Electrocution	
47	November 18, 2009	Danielle Nathaniel Simpson	30	20	10	Male	Black	Texas	Lethal injection	
48	November 19, 2009	Robert Lee Thompson	34	21	13	Male	Black	Texas	Lethal injection	
49	December 2, 2009	Cecil Cortez Johnson Jr.	53	23	30	Male	Black	Tennessee	Lethal injection	
50	December 3, 2009	Bobby Wayne Woods	44	31	13	Male	White	Texas	Lethal injection	
51	December 8, 2009	Kenneth Biros	51	32	19	Male	White	Ohio	Lethal injection	
52	December 11, 2009	Matthew Eric Wrinkles	49	34	15	Male	White	Indiana	Lethal injection	
		Average:	43 years	28 years	16 years					

== Demographics ==
Gender
Male	52	100%
Female	0	0%
Ethnicity
White	24	46%
Black	21	40%
Hispanic	7	13%
State
Texas	24	46%
Alabama	6	12%
Ohio	5	10%
Georgia	3	6%
Oklahoma	3	6%
Virginia	3	6%
Florida	2	4%
South Carolina	2	4%
Tennessee	2	4%
Indiana	1	2%
Missouri	1	2%
Method
Lethal injection	51	98%
Electrocution	1	2%
Month
January	7	13%
February	8	15%
March	5	10%
April	4	8%
May	5	10%
June	3	6%
July	3	6%
August	2	4%
September	2	4%
October	3	6%
November	6	12%
December	4	8%
Age
20–29	2	4%
30–39	20	38%
40–49	16	31%
50–59	10	19%
60–69	4	8%
Total	52	100%

== Executions in recent years ==
Number of executions
2010	46
2009	52
2008	37
Total	135

== See also ==
- List of death row inmates in the United States
- List of most recent executions by jurisdiction
- List of people scheduled to be executed in the United States
- List of women executed in the United States since 1976

Preceded by 2008	List of people executed in the United States in 2009	Succeeded by 2010
