= 1992 Dayton Christmas murders =

1992 spree murders during Christmas in Dayton, Ohio, U.S.

- Location: Dayton, Ohio, United States
- Date: December 24–26, 1992
- Attack type: Murders by shooting
- Victims: 6 murdered, 2 injured
- Verdict: Guilty
- Convictions: Aggravated murder
- Sentence: Keene; Death; Taylor, Smith and Matthews; Life imprisonment
- Convicted: Marvallous Keene, 19; Heather Nicole Matthews, 20; DeMarcus Maurice Smith, 17; Laura Jeanne Taylor, 16

The 1992 Dayton Christmas murders were a series of murders committed by a four-member gang, during a three-day period around Christmas Day of 1992 in Dayton, Ohio, United States. The four murderers, led by ringleader Marvallous Matthew Keene, had killed a total of six people and injured another two, with varying motives of robbery and to silence potential witnesses, and the deceased victims included two friends of Keene. All four perpetrators, aged between 16 and 20, were arrested and charged with multiple counts of aggravated murder.

The trial of the four ended with Keene sentenced to death for five of the murders, while the rest – Heather Nicole Matthews, Laura Jeanne Taylor and DeMarcus Maurice Smith – were all sentenced to life in prison. Keene was ultimately executed by lethal injection on July 21, 2009, becoming the 1,000th condemned person in the U.S. to undergo a lethal injection execution since 1982.

== Murders ==
Over a three-day period from December 24 to December 26, 1992, a juvenile gang, who called themselves the "Downtown Posse", led by the 19-year-old ringleader Marvallous Matthew Keene, committed a series of six murders and multiple robberies across Dayton, Ohio.

Apart from Keene, the "Downtown Posse" consisted of three other members: Keene's 16-year-old girlfriend, Laura Jeanne Taylor; the gang's oldest member, 20-year-old Heather Nicole Matthews; and Matthews's 17-year-old boyfriend, DeMarcus Maurice Smith.

=== Murder of Joseph Wilkerson ===
On December 24, 1992, three of the co-conspirators – Keene, Taylor and Matthews – teamed up together to rob a man Taylor figured would pay them for sex. The trio targeted 34-year-old Joseph Wilkerson, who was an acquaintance of Taylor, and they met up with Wilkerson under the pretext of wanting to have an orgy with Wilkerson.

After they had a drink, all four went into Wilkerson's bedroom, where they held Wilkerson at gunpoint and tied him to his bed with electrical cords. The girls ransacked the house for items to steal, while Keene kept watch of their hostage. The trio found a .32 caliber Derringer, which Keene used to shoot and kill Wilkerson by discharging the gun at his chest, with blankets covering the body to muffle the noise. Taylor also shot Wilkerson in the head after Keene stopped shooting.

After they murdered Wilkerson, the trio fled the house in one of Wilkerson's two cars.

=== Murder of Danita Gullette ===
After the murder of Wilkerson, the trio, now joined by their fourth member Smith, went to hunt for more victims, and they took the life of 18-year-old Danita Gullette on the same day they killed Wilkerson.

Taylor, Keene and Smith, who were all armed with guns, went walking together and they chanced upon Gullette, who was calling someone on a pay phone. After this, Smith and Keene drew their guns and the former forced Gullette at gunpoint to take her shoes off. After taking the shoes, Smith and Keene shot Gullette to death, before they made off with her shoes and jacket. When they returned to the apartment, Taylor was wearing Gullette's jacket and Smith was carrying Gullette's shoes.

At the time of her death, Gullette was a high school senior and part-time fast food restaurant employee who had a two-year-old daughter.

=== Shooting of Jeffrey Wright ===
After killing Gullette, the group went back to Wilkerson's house to spend the night, but on that same night, the group decided to target a third victim.

The third victim was Jeffrey "Jeff" Wright, who was the ex-boyfriend of Matthews. After he confronted Wright at their apartment and argued with Wright, Smith used a gun to shoot Wright in the legs four times, but Wright was able to escape to a neighbour's house, and he survived the shooting.

=== Murder of Richmond Maddox ===
On December 25, 1992, a day after the murders of Wilkerson and Gullette and the non-fatal shooting of Wright, Keene returned to the house of Wilkerson to steal his second car and other valuables.

After the theft, the youngest member of the gang, Taylor, coaxed her 19-year-old former boyfriend Richmond Maddox from his parents' home and they both drove in Maddox's car, with Keene, Smith and Matthews trailing behind. After Maddox spotted the car of the trio, he became suspicious and sped up his car. While Maddox was driving, Taylor aimed the stolen Derringer pistol at the right temple of Maddox and fired a single shot, killing Maddox. Taylor was able to escape the car before it crashed on Benton Avenue and rejoined her accomplices.

=== Murder of Sarah Abraham and shooting of Jones Pettus ===
On the early morning of December 26, 1992, a day after Maddox's murder, the gang went to rob a grocery store and shot three people, which resulted in the death of 38-year-old Sarah Abraham and the wounding of one man.

On that day itself, after the gang robbed a woman named Kathie Henderson and stole her car, they went to a grocery store with intent to commit armed robbery. Abraham, whose family owned the store, was working behind the cash register when Taylor entered the store to check the interior of the place itself. Abraham and a shop helper named Edward Thompson were the only two staff members present at that time.

After Taylor reported to her accomplices about the number of people inside the store, Keene and Smith went into the store with guns, and they threatened Abraham at gunpoint, ordering her to open her cash register and hand over the money. After Abraham complied and gave Keene $40, Keene shot Abraham in the head and simultaneously, Smith also shot at Thompson and another man named Jones Pettus, who was a customer of the store; Pettus sustained a gunshot wound to his abdomen but Thompson was not hurt due to the bullet missing him. The pair then departed from the store, leaving the three victims behind.

In the aftermath of the shooting, Abraham, who was mortally wounded, was rushed to hospital for treatment, but she died four days later. Pettus survived his injuries. Abraham left behind three children, the oldest of whom was 11 at the time of her murder.

=== Murders of Marvin Washington and Wendy Cottrill ===
After the grocery store robbery, the gang became increasingly fearful that they might get exposed to the police if any of their friends snitched on them. Based on sources, at least two of the gang's friends, 16-year-old Wendy Cottrill and 18-year-old Marvin Washington, had known to a certain extent about the gang's crime spree throughout the last three days.

According to the testimony of Matthews in her trial, she and Taylor discussed about "jumping" Cottrill after believing that she might tell on the group. As for Smith, he thought of getting rid of Washington (as well as Cottrill) for having known about his involvement in the shooting of Jeffrey Wright. The group of four then planned to lure both Cottrill and Washington to another place.

After picking up Washington and Cottrill, the gang drove to a gravel pit in Dayton and forced the pair out of the car. While being threatened at gunpoint, both Washington and Cottrill protested that they had not gone to the police to snitch on them. However, Keene shot and murdered Cottrill, while Washington was shot to death by Smith.

The bodies of the pair were not found until five days later. A friend of Cottrill told the Dayton Daily News that Cottrill was three months' pregnant at the time she was killed.

== Murder trials and sentencing ==
=== Capture and charges ===
On December 26, 1992, the same date when the murders of Sarah Abraham, Wendy Cottrill and Marvin Washington happened, the police arrested the gang some 72 hours after the first killing of Joseph Wilkerson. While the gang returned to a friend's house where they left Wilkerson's car, a police car tailed the group's car (the same one stolen from Henderson) after spotting the group behaving suspiciously. The group got wind of the police car, and Smith fled out of the car, leaving the rest to remain in the vehicle. Keene, Matthews and Taylor were all caught while trying to leave the house, and Smith was arrested thereafter.

After their arrests, the two adult offenders, Heather Matthews and Marvallous Keene, were both arraigned in the Dayton Municipal Court to face charges of aggravated murder and robbery, and they were each ordered to be held on a cash bond of $5 million. Mathias Heck Jr., a prosecutor of Montgomery County, expressed his intention to seek the death penalty for both Keene and Matthews; under Ohio state law, the offence of aggravated murder carries the death penalty or life imprisonment. Keene reportedly confessed to the murders during police interrogation.

DeMarcus Smith and Laura Taylor, who were both juveniles at the time of their arrests and crimes, were charged in the Montgomery County Juvenile Court and held without bond. Heck sought the approval to try both Smith and Taylor as adults, which may carry at least a sentence of 25 years to life in prison. As Smith and Taylor were underaged when the murders were committed, capital punishment was not allowed in their cases. In May 1993, it was confirmed that both Smith and Taylor would be tried as adults, after a judge found that the juveniles could not be rehabilitated within the juvenile system.

In response to the murders, many family members and friends of the victims and killers alike mourned for the deaths of the victims. One of Danita Gullette's brothers, Richard, said that his sister did not deserve to be shot down like a dog, while another brother, Darrell, who shared the same apartment as Gullette, said that a part of him felt empty after his sister died. A friend of Wendy Cottrill said that she did not wish for her friend to be forgotten as she appeared in a bond hearing for Keene and Matthews. Sarah Abraham's brother Solomon told the press that he felt the killers did the crimes for thrill instead of money, since they shot his sister even after she gave them money. Keene's mother said that she understood the feelings of losing a loved one to murder, as her older son Maurice (Keene's older brother) was shot and murdered by another man in 1991.

The first funeral of one of the victims, Gullette, was conducted on December 30, 1992.

=== Trial of Marvallous Keene ===
Marvallous Keene was charged with murdering five of the six victims in the Christmas killings, four of whom he was the triggerman. Keene did not face a sixth murder charge for the death of Richmond Maddox. Keene claimed trial before a three-judge court and waived his right to a jury on September 30, 1993. Prior to his arrest and trial, Keene did not have a criminal record.

A three-judge panel, led by Montgomery County Common Pleas Judge Robert Brown, delivered the verdict on October 12, 1993, finding 20-year-old Marvallous Keene guilty of all 20 counts, including aggravated murder, aggravated burglary, attempted aggravated murder, kidnapping, burglary and aggravated robbery. A sentencing trial was conducted between October 25 and October 27, 1993.

On October 28, 1993, the three judges opted to impose the death penalty for each count of murder but adjourned the sentencing to a later date. Before the court's decision, Keene tearfully apologized during the hearing and attempted to plead for leniency by revealing that his brother died in a shooting case in 1991 and his fall-out with his father, both of which led to him having a troubled emotional state, but the court went ahead with capital punishment in the end.

On December 10, 1993, Keene was sentenced to death during a formal hearing. Keene was also sentenced to consecutive jail terms ranging between 121 and 293 years for the other lesser charges against him. The trial judges found that the aggravating factors in Keene's case outweighed the mitigating factors and it was justified to subject Keene to five death sentences. Montgomery County Assistant Prosecutor Angela Frydman described the death sentences of Keene as a just sentence and it symbolized the judiciary's commitment to protect society.

Five days after he was sentenced to death, on December 15, 1993, Keene was officially transferred to death row under the Ohio Department of Rehabilitation and Correction.

=== Sentencing of the three other accused ===
Unlike Keene, Heather Nicole Matthews, the other adult perpetrator, was granted a plea bargain after some discussions between the defence and prosecution, and the prosecution agreed to take the death penalty off the table as a condition of the plea deal. Matthews was therefore sentenced to two consecutive life terms for two counts of aggravated murder and her jail term amounted to 194 years (including the other jail terms for lesser charges). It was decreed that Matthews would not be eligible for parole for a minimum period of 53 years (for each life term). (Note: Matthews was convicted of aggravated murder for the deaths of Wilkerson and Abraham.)

Both Laura Jeanne Taylor and DeMarcus Maurice Smith, who were ineligible for a death sentence, were tried in January and February 1994 respectively for the murders, and they were sentenced to life imprisonment. Similarly, Smith and Taylor were both ineligible for parole for at least more than 100 years. (Note: Taylor was convicted of aggravated murder for killing Wilkerson and Abraham, while she faced a lesser murder charge for shooting Maddox. Smith was found guilty of aggravated murder on four counts for the deaths of Washington, Cottrill, Abraham and Gullette.) In response to the sentencing of her boyfriend (Smith), Matthews lamented the fact that she never had a chance to marry Smith, whom she loved, and she was reportedly glad to see the legal process coming to a close, although she described life in prison as "no life" at all, as she found nothing in her will to live and she wished to kill herself.

== Appeal processes ==
After the end of the trial, Laura Taylor appealed against her murder convictions and life term. On November 17, 1995, the Ohio Second District Court of Appeals rejected her appeal.

Marvallous Keene, the only member of the gang to be held on death row at the Ohio State Penitentiary, spent more than a decade appealing against his death sentence. On January 21, 1998, Keene filed an appeal to the Ohio Supreme Court, but the appeal was dismissed on May 13, 1998.

On April 25, 2008, the 6th Circuit Court of Appeals rejected Keene's appeal. Keene had earlier argued that the prosecution's decision to pursue the death penalty against him was racially motivated since he was African-American while his other adult co-defendant Heather Williams was White and did not face the death sentence after reaching a plea bargain. (Note: Matthews was the only White member of the "Downtown Posse" while Keene and the two juveniles, Smith and Taylor, were African-American.) Keene cited a precedent case where a series of murders committed under similar circumstances as the Dayton murders did not end with the three accused – all of whom were White – sentenced to death. A case study cited by Keene showed that there were 9% of African Americans in Ohio, yet 49% of the death row population in Ohio were of African American descent, which was used to support Keene's argument of racial discrimination caused by capital punishment. Keene also submitted that the surviving witness Kathie Henderson's pre-trial identification of him as the shooter was unduly suggestive and it violated his due process rights.

However, the 6th Circuit Court of Appeals found that Keene's arguments did not hold much weight in his favour, as the difference between Keene and Matthews was that Matthews did not personally shoot the victims while Keene pulled the trigger in most of these murders, and the evidence to prove Matthew's direct involvement in the murders paled in comparison to the more prominent role Keene played in the deaths of the victims. It was noted that Matthews faced only two counts of murder and while she was involved, the evidence did not affirmatively suggest that she intended to cause the death of these two victims, and Keene himself personally murdered at least four of the victims, and hence the decision to seek the death penalty solely against Keene was not proven to be racially motivated. The precedent case cited by Keene also showed that out of the three white men accused of killing two men, two of them agreed to testify against the third, who was in the end acquitted of one murder while convicted of the other, and the aggravating factors were lesser than the ones proven in Keene's case, which showed that the death penalty against Keene was more appropriate than the precedent capital case.

Furthermore, the court found that Henderson's identification of Keene as the gunman who stole her car before the murder of Sarah Abraham was reliable since she had been held at gunpoint by Keene and had ample opportunity to gain the facial description of Keene and observe distinctive features of the robber. Hence, the use of the identification was admissible and did not breach the fairness of Keene's trial. On these grounds, the 6th Circuit Court of Appeals rejected Keene's appeal. In fact, the Ohio Supreme Court had rejected similar arguments of racial bias and unfair trial practices from Keene back in 1998.

On the other hand, both DeMarcus Smith and Heather Matthews did not appeal with respect to their cases, and remained in prison serving their life sentences.

== Execution of Marvallous Keene ==
=== Death warrant ===
More than 16 years after the murders, on April 9, 2009, state prosecutors filed applications to the Ohio Supreme Court to schedule the execution date of Marvallous Keene, who had exhausted all his avenues of appeal at this point in time.

On May 6, 2009, by a majority decision of 6–1, the Ohio Supreme Court approved and signed a death warrant for Keene, and ordered that his death sentence should be carried out on July 21, 2009.

In response to Keene's death warrant, an appeal was lodged to delay his execution, but the Ohio Supreme Court refused to halt the execution. Apart from this, the Ohio Supreme Court also ruled that for the future executions scheduled beforehand, including Keene's, they would be conducted every three weeks apart of each other.

A clemency hearing was conducted for Keene, even though he did not request for clemency. The hearing convened before a seven-member panel of the Ohio Parole Board, who heard the case to decide whether to recommend clemency. Rhonda Gullette, whose sister Danita was shot and killed by Keene, represented 15 family members of Keene's victims and told the board that she wrote a letter to Keene, asking him why he killed her sister, but Keene never wrote back, and she told the board about the devastating impact of her sister's death to their family. During the hearing, Keene directed his lawyers Kelly Schneider and Rachel Troutman to not submit any evidence in mitigation, so as to not prolong the pain of his victim's surviving kin.

As part of the opposition to clemency, both Carley Ingram, the appellate division chief for the Montgomery County prosecutor's office, and Assistant Attorney General Thomas Madden urged the board to consider the gravity of the crimes, for which Keene's guilt was not put in question and affirmed by the courts. Ingram also said that Keene showed no remorse for his actions, and his sole concern has been for himself and his predicament after the murders. In the end, the parole board unanimously voted 7–0 to recommend that the governor reject clemency for Keene. The board found that Keene had murdered the victims in "a cold and calculated manner" that did not warrant mercy. Ohio Governor Ted Strickland similarly concurred with the board's findings and declined to grant clemency to Keene a week before he was to be executed.

After the loss of his clemency plea, during his final days on death row, Keene did not file any last-minute appeals to stave off his execution. On the eve of his execution, Keene was transferred to the death house, where he would be under 24-hour death watch surveillance before the execution commenced. Reportedly, Keene did not request to meet with family members, and none of them were known to be attending his execution.

=== Execution ===
On July 21, 2009, 36-year-old Marvallous Keene was put to death via lethal injection at the Southern Ohio Correctional Facility. Keene was documented as the 1,000th death row inmate in the U.S. to be executed by lethal injection since its first use in 1982. Keene was also the 1,171st death row convict to be put to death since the 1976 resumption of capital punishment in the U.S.

Prior to his execution, Keene ordered a final meal of one Porterhouse steak with A-1 sauce, one pound of jumbo fried shrimp with cocktail sauce, French fries and onion rings, a tube of Pillsbury dinner rolls and butter, two plums, a mango, one pound of seedless white grapes, German chocolate cake, two bottles of Pepsi and two bottles of A&W Cream Soda. When asked if he had a final statement before his execution, Keene said, "No, I have no words."

It was also noted that Ohio scheduled the execution dates of the condemned at an unusually high rate during that year of 2009 itself, with at least one death warrant per month, and Keene was one of the five executed in Ohio that same year. Keene was the 31st condemned inmate to be executed in Ohio since the state's resumption of executions in 1999.

== Incarceration of Matthews, Taylor and Smith ==
In the aftermath of Keene's execution, his three surviving accomplices – Heather Matthews, Laura Taylor and DeMarcus Smith – remain in prison serving their sentences.

Both Taylor and Matthews were detained at the Ohio Reformatory for Women in Marysville. Matthews remained there as of 2025, while Taylor was incarcerated at the Dayton Correctional Institution, according to the Ohio Department of Corrections website. Smith was serving his life sentence at the Mansfield Correctional Institute, but had moved to the North Central Correctional Institution as of 2025.

In 2024, Matthews was one of the female inmates featured in an article for The Columbus Dispatch, due to her portrait being painted for the Marysville Women's Art Project. She is eligible for parole in 2130.

Taylor was rejected for parole at her initial hearing in 2021. Her next parole hearing is set for October 2026.

Smith's next scheduled parole hearing is in 2034.

== Aftermath ==
In the following years after the killings, families and friends of the victims continued to be plagued with emotion and trauma over the case. In November 2019, Rhonda Gullette, whose sister Danita was shot to death, told the press that due to her sister's death, she could not enjoy the Christmas holidays like in the past, because she would often think of her sister during such festive times.

In 2017, a documentary titled Six Slays of Christmas, which covered the 1992 Christmas murders in Dayton, aired on national television network Oxygen as part of the network's true crime series Homicide for the Holidays. The documentary was aired on-screen again in December 2021.

In 2018, a book covering the real-life details of the 1992 Dayton Christmas murders, titled The Christmas Killings: 40 Hours to Justice: Black and White, was published by the Dayton Police History Foundation and co-authored by Stephen C. Grismer, Judith M. Monseur and Dennis A. Murphy.

== See also ==
- Capital punishment in Ohio
- List of people executed in Ohio
- List of people executed in the United States in 2009
- List of rampage killers in the United States

Executions carried out in Ohio
Preceded by John Fautenberry July 14, 2009	Marvallous Keene; July 21, 2009	Succeeded by Jason Getsy August 18, 2009
Executions carried out in the United States
Preceded by John Fautenberry – Ohio July 14, 2009	Marvallous Keene – Ohio; July 21, 2009	Succeeded by Jason Getsy – Ohio August 18, 2009
