= Christopher Newton (criminal) =

American murderer

Christopher J. Newton
- Born: November 13, 1969; Ohio, U.S.
- Died: May 24, 2007 (aged 37); Southern Ohio Correctional Facility, Ohio, U.S.
- Status: Executed by lethal injection
- Convictions: Aggravated murder Burglary; Attempted aggravated burglary Receiving stolen property Attempted escape Weapon under disability
- Penalty: Death (February 2003)

Christopher J. Newton (November 13, 1969 – May 24, 2007) was an American murderer executed in the state of Ohio in 2007.

Christopher Newton received the death penalty for the 2001 aggravated murder of his cellmate, Jason Brewer, during a dispute over a chess game. At the time of the murder, Newton was imprisoned for attempted aggravated burglary of his father's home, an offense he committed a few weeks after his release from prison for a prior attempted aggravated burglary.

== Personal life ==
Newton was born on November 13, 1969 to parents Jean and Lynn Newton. He was the youngest of five sons and one daughter. Their parents worked opposite shifts, and their mother operated an antique store and was also frequently gone. Their parents communicated with each other only by yelling or arguing. Their father was strict and imposed physical discipline, but their permissive mother did not follow through on punishments that had been imposed. His father had been physically abusive and perhaps sexually abusive. At various times in his life, Newton claimed that his father had sexually abused him, but at other times, he denied it. Newton was also bullied by his older siblings. Newton told Ort that he had been sexually abused by one of his brothers when he was five and by a neighbor when he was 11.

Newton was different from the other children when he was growing up, and he started getting into trouble at a very early age. When the family went on vacation, they left Newton to stay with their grandmother. The other children called Newton “Pyro” because he had set their home on fire when he was five or six years old, causing the family to live elsewhere for six months.

While growing up, Newton developed severe behavioral problems, including sexual acting out, theft, and drug and alcohol abuse. The Berea Children's Home had identified him as a very high-risk youth. Newton told Ort that as a teenager, he devoted himself to satanic groups and activities. In 1988, when Newton was 19, he was arrested in Florida for burglary and grand theft. In 1990, 1991, and 1992, he was arrested again for various offenses. Newton was incarcerated from 1992 until 1999, was briefly out on parole, and was then returned to prison for burglary of his fathers house. He would later explain that he deliberately left evidence at the scene of the burglary because he wanted to go to prison again.

== The Murder of Jason Brewer ==
On October 16, 2001, Newton, claiming that another inmate had threatened to stab him, requested that he be placed in protective custody. He was assigned to cell 115 with Brewer in a section of MANCI (Mansfield Correctional Institution in Mansfield, OH) reserved for inmates who request special protection. Brewer was 27 years old, five feet, 11 inches tall, and weighed 130 pounds. Newton was 32 years old, five feet, 11 inches tall, and weighed between 195 and 225 pounds. Brewer had been serving a three to ten year sentence for attempted burglary.

On November 15, 2001, around 5:10 a.m., correctional officers responded to a disturbance in cell 115. Brewer was lying still on the floor in a puddle of blood with a piece of orange cloth wrapped around his neck. Newton was laughing and had blood smeared all over his face. MANCI nurse Trena Butcher testified that when she examined Newton, he told her that he had “painted himself with the victim's blood and had also ingested the victim's blood as part of the ritual when you kill someone.” MANCI nurses testified that when she responded to cell 115, Brewer was not breathing and had no pulse. Responding paramedics worked diligently, and eventually Brewer's heart began to beat. An officer testified that while medical personnel were trying to save Brewer's life, Newton was laughing and yelling, "'Let him die. I killed him.'" According to paramedics, Newton said, "'Fuck that bitch [Brewer]. You might as well not even work on him. He is already dead.'" Nurses recall Newton periodically shouting to the paramedics, "'Stop, let the fucker die.'" State Highway Patrol Trooper Doug Hamman described Newton as singing, "'There is nothing like the taste of fresh blood in the morning.'"

After paramedics established a heartbeat, Brewer was taken to MedCentral Hospital, then flown to the Ohio State University Medical Center, where he was declared brain dead around 2:30 p.m. After an autopsy, Dr. Dorothy Dean, a forensic pathologist, concluded that Brewer had died from a ligature strangulation. Brewer also suffered other injuries to his head and body consistent with his having been kicked or stomped on. Newton had allowed Brewer to lie dead for an hour in the cell because Newton knew that paramedics would try to save his life. Newton made comments about how prison was more fun than the outside. MANCI Lieutenant Joe Albert recalled that Newton had seemed happy and had repeatedly asked, "'Did I kill him? Is he dead?'" Newton also said, "[I]f he is not dead, I hope he is going to be a vegetable."

Although Albert did not want to interview him, Newton was adamant about making a statement. Albert advised Newton of his Miranda rights, and Newton waived them. Newton described how he had choked and assaulted Brewer starting around 3:45 a.m. Using a razor blade, Newton had cut a strip off an orange jumpsuit and had used that strip to strangle Brewer. In Newton's cell, COs found four letters addressed to various prison officials, dated November 14, in which Newton stated that he had lied to obtain protective custody. He stated that his real reason for requesting protective custody was to “take care of a little problem,” and the job was now done. Newton authenticated the letters by his bloody fingerprints and referred to himself as “Satan's Messenger, 666.”

Newton told Smith that another inmate had hired him to beat up Brewer and that at around 10:00 p.m. the previous evening, while he and Brewer were playing chess, they argued, and then he struck Brewer. They both stayed awake, and Newton spent time making a rope so that he could strangle Brewer. Around 3:30 a.m., as Brewer was going to sleep, Newton pulled Brewer out of bed and hit his head against the floor and stomped on his head twice. Newton then strangled Brewer with the rope he had made, until it broke. Newton punched Brewer in the face a few times and then cut a strip off a prison jumpsuit and strangled Brewer with it. Then Newton stomped on Brewer's head again. Although Brewer begged, “Please don't kill me,” Newton estimates that he stomped Brewer's head with his foot between five and ten times. He also stomped on his throat and chest a few times. After Newton finished assaulting Brewer, he smeared Brewer's blood on his face and licked the blood off his hands. After 30 minutes or so, he called to a CO and said, “Welcome to the house of death!” Newton also stated that he knew he would die in prison and hoped for the death penalty. On November 18, Newton wrote an 11-page letter relating details of the murder.

He explained that he killed Brewer because he repeatedly gave up on a chess game the pair were playing in their cell. He was angered that Brewer would give up in the chess game after getting put in check and ask for a new game. Newton said this angered him and he lost his temper resulting in him murdering Brewer.

== Trial ==
According to the Ohio Supreme Court, numerous psychiatrists and psychologists had examined Newton over the years, resulting in various diagnoses. At the capital trial, a defense psychologist testified that Newton had several mental health disorders, including "mood disorder" and symptoms of post-traumatic stress disorder (PTSD).

Dr. Miles Oden, a board-certified psychiatrist employed at MANCI, evaluated Newton in December 2001, three weeks after the murder. Oden noted that Newton had a history of psychiatric treatment because he had reported auditory hallucinations. But Oden testified that Newton had later admitted that he had fabricated symptoms “so he could obtain psychotropic medications, which made him feel high.” Oden also said that Newton admitted that he has a habit of telling lies and then he starts to believe his lies after a period of time.

In response, a government psychiatrist reviewed the mental health history and rebutted the defense expert. The court denied defense funds for neuropsychiatric tests to explore other types of mental disability. Dr. Oden noted that when he saw Newton in December 2001, Newton seemed proud of the murder that he had committed three weeks earlier and took “a certain amount of gruesome pleasure at his notoriety.” When Dr. Oden saw Newton on the anniversary of the murder, November 15, 2002, Newton had made a party hat and a blowout toy to celebrate the anniversary. Dr. Oden reported that Newton appeared happy and was wearing the hat and making jokes about celebrating the anniversary of the murder.

In Dr. Sorrentino's opinion, Newton was never psychotic, never lost touch with reality, and has no symptoms of psychosis. In fact, psychological testing indicated “no psychotic process, no impaired reality.” Dr. Sorrentino believes that the earlier diagnosis of a bipolar disorder was simply incorrect because Newton made up symptoms. Newton admitted to Dr. Ort that he had read psychology texts and case studies in order to discover how to fake symptoms of mental illness. Further, Dr. Sorrentino said that the way that Newton described hearing voices was simply “not characteristic of what psychotic patients experience.”

Dr. Ort recognized that Newton is not a reliable historian of his past. For example, Newton claimed to have killed 180 people in satanic rituals, he claimed that his father had died (his father is still living), he falsely claimed that while growing up, he had been playing Russian roulette with a revolver when two children were killed, and in 1999, he falsely reported a plot to explode a bomb at Times Square on New Year's. Nonetheless, Dr. Ort concluded that Newton was a malingerer. Her conclusion was based on current psychological test data, the observations of mental-health professionals over seven years, and Newton's own admissions that he had falsely reported hearing voices or other psychotic symptoms.

The trial was before a three-court panel of judges who, after hearing the evidence, imposed the death penalty. After being sentenced to death, he began laughing in the courtroom.

== Execution ==
He was initially scheduled for execution on February 27, 2007 but the governor granted a reprieve, alongside two other inmates, to allow him to review the case. Newton was not happy about this decision and voiced how he wished to be executed. Before this, he had dropped all appeals entirely after a judge ruled he was competent to do so.

Newton was executed on May 24, 2007. A controversy arose regarding the delay in Newton's execution, as at the time he weighed 265 pounds. Subsequently, his veins were difficult to locate which made administration of the injections difficult. It took nearly two hours and 10 attempts before the execution was completed. The execution began at 10:00am with him being formally pronounced dead at 11:53am local time. During this time he would joke with the execution team and even had a bathroom break one hour into the ordeal.

His last meal was steak, asparagus, brussels sprouts, feta cheese, a soft drink, cake and watermelon. He gave a statement to officials, but his last words on the gurney were "I sure could use a beef stew and a chicken bone."

== See also ==
- List of botched executions
- List of people executed in Ohio
- List of people executed in the United States in 2007
- Volunteer (capital punishment)
