= Southern Ohio Correctional Facility =

Maximum security prison in Scioto County, Ohio, U.S.

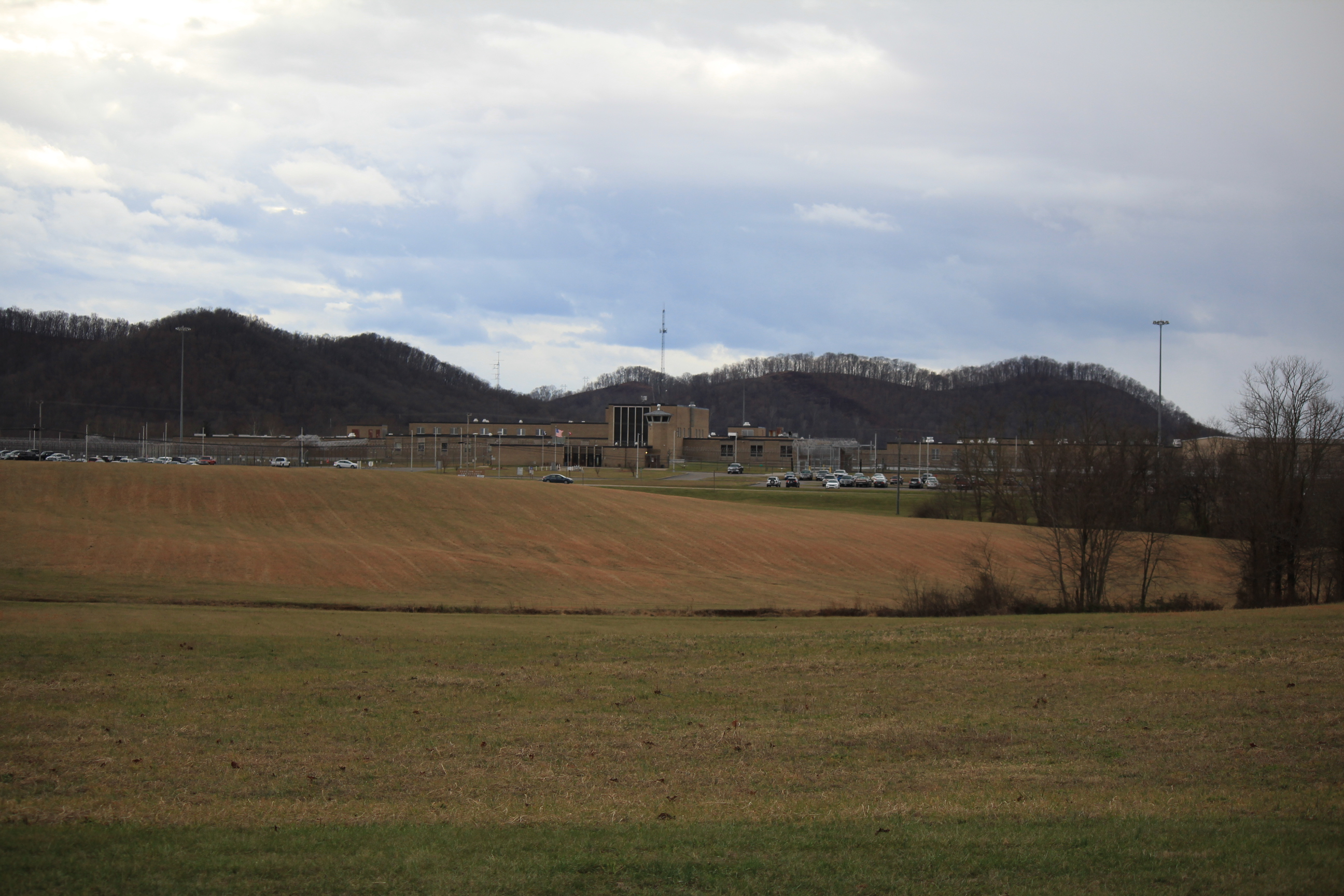
- Southern Ohio Correctional Facility viewed from Valley High School

- Location in Ohio Southern Ohio Correctional Facility (the United States)
- Location: Valley Township / Jefferson Township near Lucasville, Ohio, U.S.; 38°52′28″N 82°58′12″W
- Status: Operational
- Security class: Maximum security
- Population: 1,320 (December 4, 2025)
- Opened: 1972
- Managed by: Ohio Department of Rehabilitation and Correction
- Warden: Cindy Davis

The Southern Ohio Correctional Facility (commonly referred to as Lucasville) is a maximum-security prison located just outside Lucasville in Scioto County, Ohio, United States. The prison was constructed in 1972. As of 2023, the warden is Cindy Davis.

The prison is best known for its April 1993 riot, in which a total of 450 prisoners participated, resulting in an eleven-day standoff between rioters and law enforcement. One corrections officer and nine inmates were killed during the riot. The riot has been described as one of the largest crises in Ohio prison history and one of the longest prison sieges in U.S. history.

== Composition ==
The eastern portion resides in Jefferson Township, while the western portion is in Valley Township.

== 1993 riot ==
On April 11, 1993, 450 Lucasville inmates, including prison gangs (Gangster Disciples, NOI, and the Aryan Brotherhood), rioted and took over the L-Side section of the facility for eleven days. The prisoners' main concerns were serious overcrowding, mismanagement of the facility, and frustration stemming from mandated tuberculosis testing. In the Netflix documentary series Captive, inmate Carlos Sanders claimed that Muslim inmates refused testing because it contained phenol (which went against Islamic restrictions concerning the handling and consumption of alcohol). Investigations conducted after the riot found that gangs were also collaborating to murder inmates accused of being informants. During the riot, one corrections officer and nine inmates were killed. At the riot’s start, inmates believed to have been informants were beaten to death. Two inmates were repeatedly stabbed to death; a third inmate had paper and plastic stuffed into his mouth before he was strangled to death.

During negotiations, the inmates did not feel they were being taken seriously, and there was discussion of killing a corrections officer in retaliation. Though the group never reached a decision on the killing, one of the prisoners decided to act. According to the prosecution, Officer Robert Vallandingham, who had been taken hostage, was handcuffed and strangled with a dumbbell from the prison weight room. However, testimony by Richard Fardal, Franklin County Deputy Coroner, disputed the claim that Officer Vallandingham was killed by a weight, saying that there was "no injury to the voice box or the trachea" and that "Mr. Vallandingham died solely and exclusively as a result of ligature strangulation." Testimonies vary as to which prisoner was responsible for his murder. For a week and a half, gang representatives met daily in an improvised leadership council.

The riot eventually concluded on April 21. Prison officials agreed to review the prisoners' complaints, which resulted in the prisoners' surrender.

Communications issues experienced during the response to the riot contributed to the state's decision to build an interoperable statewide radio system.

=== Lucasville Five ===
Five prisoners described as the riot leaders were sentenced to death for their roles during the riot. They were known as the Lucasville Five:

- Bomani Shakur (Keith LaMar) (born May 31, 1969, in Cleveland, Ohio), on Ohio Death Row at the Ohio State Penitentiary, scheduled for execution on January 16, 2030. LaMar, who was unaffiliated with any of the above-mentioned groups, was sentenced to death in 1995 for his leadership of a group who killed inmates during the riot, including Darrell Depina, Bruce Vitale, Albert Staiano, William Svette, and Dennis Weaver. He was previously convicted of murder in 1989. Lamar denies his leadership and claims the State of Ohio suppressed evidence that could demonstrate his innocence. He was not present in L-6 during the majority of the riot, having been taken off the rec yard the first day by the State authorities and housed in the K block.
- Siddique Abdullah Hasan (Carlos A. Sanders) (born January 4, 1963), on Ohio Death Row at the Ohio State Penitentiary, awaiting execution. Sanders was convicted of killing Correctional Officer Robert Vallandingham.
- Jason Harry Robb (born June 15, 1967), on Ohio Death Row at the Ohio State Penitentiary, awaiting execution. Robb was convicted of killing Correctional Officer Robert Vallandingham and inmate David Sommers.
- George W. Skatzes (born March 29, 1946), on Ohio Death Row at Ross Correctional Institution, awaiting execution. Skatzes was convicted of killing Correctional Officer Robert Vallandingham along with inmates Earl Elder and David Sommers. He had previously been convicted of murdering Arthur Smith in 1979.
- Namir Abdul Mateen (James Were) (born January 20, 1957), on Ohio Death Row at the Ohio State Penitentiary, awaiting execution. Were was convicted of killing Correctional Officer Robert Vallandingham.

Following the riot, a class action was brought against the state officers, administrators, and staff by a legal team headed by civil rights attorney Al Gerhardstein on behalf of the inmate victims of the riot. The state paid $4.1 million to settle the claims of the victims and agreed to a number of non-monetary terms as well, to remedy the overcrowding and mismanagement of the facility.

== 2011 related hunger strike ==
On January 3, 2011, LaMar and Sanders began a twelve-day, liquid-only hunger strike at the Ohio State Penitentiary supermax prison in Youngstown, Ohio. On January 4, 2011, Robb joined the hunger strike. The three death row inmates were living in solitary confinement for 23 hours a day. Additionally, they were restricted from using the internet to access news databases, denied access to the prison stores, and prohibited from physical contact with family. LaMar, Sanders, and Robb desired the same treatment as the other Ohio death row inmates and protested for equal prison conditions. The three death row inmates demanded that they be granted additional time outside their cells, physical contact with family members, and access to the prison stores for additional clothing and food.

At the time of the strike, David Bobby, the prison warden, concluded that he would not meet any of the prisoners' demands. However, by January 14, 2011, Bobby presented the inmates with a signed statement detailing future policy changes. Due to growing public support and pressure from organizations such as human rights and legal scholars, the American Civil Liberties Union, and the Center for Constitutional Rights, the prison was under pressure to change, which Binghamton University sociology professor Denis O'Hearn has credited as playing a decisive role in the hunger strike's success. The three inmates' demands were all granted, including limited physical contact with family, daily one-hour phone calls, and additional time outside the prison cell. By January 15, 2011, LaMar, Sanders, and Robb had ended their hunger strike.

== Death row ==
The Southern Ohio Correctional Facility is where condemned Ohio prisoners are executed; however, prisoners awaiting execution are not housed there on a long-term basis. Since the riots, the men's death row has been relocated four times. The first relocation was to the Mansfield Correctional Institution in Mansfield, with the majority of inmates being moved later to the Ohio State Penitentiary, a supermax facility in Youngstown, while a few remained at Mansfield. Most condemned inmates were moved to the Chillicothe Correctional Institution in Chillicothe in 2012 before being moved in 2024 to a new death row unit at the nearby Ross Correctional Institution. Of the death row inmates, ninety-three are housed at Ross Correctional Institution, eleven are housed at the Ohio State Penitentiary, three are housed at Franklin Medical Center, and one is held at Warren Correctional Institution. Any future cisgender female prisoners sentenced to death will be held at the Ohio Reformatory for Women in Marysville.

== Notable inmates ==
Inmate Name	Inmate Number	Sentence	Details
Romell Broom	A187343	Sentenced to death.	Broom was on death row for the 1984 murder of Tryna Middleton. He survived a failed attempt to execute him in 2009, and later died in 2020 from COVID-19 before a further execution attempt could take place.
Fred "Ahmed" Evans	Unknown	Sentenced to death, commuted to life.	Evans was convicted of seven counts of first degree murder following the 1968 Glenville Shootout in Cleveland, Ohio. He was sentenced to death in 1969 after being found guilty by an all-white jury and it was later commuted to life in 1972 following Furman v. Georgia. He later died in prison in 1978 from cancer.
T.J. Lane	A640654	Sentenced to life without the possibility of parole.	Perpetrator of the 2012 Chardon High School Shooting killing 3 students and injuring 3 more. Lane later escaped from Allen-Oakwood Correctional Institution in Lima, Ohio for several hours before being captured. Following his capture, he was moved to SOCF in Lucasville, Ohio.
Thomas Dillon	A277618	Sentenced to life with the possibility of parole after 165 years.	After being found guilty of five counts of aggravated murder in 1993, Dillon was sentenced to 165 years to life where he served them at SOCF in Lucasville, Ohio. He later died in 2011.
James Ruppert	A169321	Sentenced to life with the possibility of parole after 10 years.	Ruppert was the perpetrator of the 1975 Easter Sunday Massacre in Hamilton, Ohio, where he shot and killed 11 members of his family. He was found guilty of all 11 murders, but due to an error, a mistrial was ruled. A new trial was granted in 1982 and he was later found guilty of the murders of his mother and brother and not guilty by reason of insanity for the 9 other victims. Ruppert later died in prison at the age of 88 in 2022.

== Executed inmates ==
Below is a list of all inmates executed in the state of Ohio since 1976:

No.	Inmate Name	Inmate Number	Execution Date	Details
1	Wilford Berry, Jr	Unlisted	February 19, 1999	Convicted of killing his employer, he was assaulted on death row because of his "volunteer status" after waiving his appeals in order to keep from delaying other inmates' execution dates. He became the first person executed and the first person to volunteer to be executed in Ohio since 1963.
2	Jay D. Scott	Unlisted	June 14, 2001	After being sentenced to death in 1984 for the 1983 murders of two people in Cleveland, Ohio, he became the second person executed in Ohio since 1963 and the first person to be executed involuntarily after two previous halted attempts in April and May of that year.
3	Alton Coleman	A205901	April 26, 2002	Coleman, a serial killer and rapist, was convicted of four counts of murder across three states along with his accomplice, Debra Brown. Brown was sentenced to death row, but this was later commuted to life without parole. He was first charged with sex crimes in Illinois in 1973 and through his life, he raped most of his victims as well as several inmates in jail in 1976. He was sentenced to death in Ohio, Illinois, and Indiana for his murders and 20 years federally for kidnapping.
4	Robert Anthony Buell	A177711	September 25, 2002	Perpetrator of the 1982 rape and murder of 11-year-old Krista Harrison in Marshallville, Ohio, he was sentenced to death in 1984. After his execution, it was discovered he was also the perpetrator of the 1981 rape and murder of 12-year-old Tina Harmon in Lodi, Ohio.
5	William Wickline	A178066	March 30, 2004	Known as "The Butcher," Wickline was convicted of two counts of aggravated murder in Ohio in 1985 after the 1982 murders of a Columbus couple. An investigation also linked him to the 1979 murder of a South Carolina man in Parkersburg, West Virginia, as well as he was suspected of several other murders.
6	John William Byrd, Jr	A175145	February 19, 2002	Byrd was sentenced to death in August 1983 after the April 1983 murder of convenience store clerk, 40-year-old Monte Tewksbury, during a robbery. He stabbed Tewksbury with a five-inch bowie knife to the hilt through his side into the liver. After leaving the scene, Byrd and his accomplice, John Brewer, robbed after store before being apprehended at a Kmart shortly after.
7	Richard Edwin Fox	A227307	February 12, 2003	Convicted of the 1989 murder of 18-year-old Leslie Keckler, Fox lured her into a motel under false pretenses of a job interview. After stabbing and assaulting her, her body was found four days later with a broken clasp on her brassiere, a tear in the crotch of her pantyhose, and it was noted that two dress buttons were missing. He was sentenced to death in 1990. He was also suspected of the 1983 death of his wife in Oregon.
8	David M. Brewer	A187234	April 29, 2003	Brewer was sentenced to death in 1985 for the abduction, rape, and murder of 21-year-old Sherry Byrne earlier in the year. During his execution, he proclaimed his guilt during his last words when he said "[...]there are some that are innocent. I'm not one of them, but there are plenty that are innocent."
9	Ernest Martin	A174878	June 18, 2003	Using a gun he stole off a security guard in 1982, Martin was convicted of the 1983 murder of 71-year-old Robert Robinson, the owner of a local drugstore in Cleveland, Ohio. He was convicted and sentenced to death later that year. He proclaimed his innocence until his death despite multiple witnesses and a letter where he told his accomplice to put the blame onto an individual nicknamed "Slim."
10	Lewis Williams, Jr	A176623	January 14, 2004	In 1983, Williams was convicted and sentenced to death for the theft and murder of 76-year-old Leoma Chmielewski earlier in the year. Chmielewski was the neighbor of his cousin.
11	John Glenn Roe	A183047	February 3, 2004	On October 6, 1984, Roe abducted and murdered 21-year-old Donnette Crawford before dumping her body behind a cement plant in Columbus, Ohio. He was arrested shortly after following the robbery of a RadioShack in Dayton, Ohio. Roe attempted to give information about a "Jerry" that had murdered Crawford before police had connected that the bullet fragment found in Crawford's skull came from Roe's handgun in his possession. He was charged with Crawford's death after and was convicted and sentenced to death in 1985.
12	William G. Zuern, Jr	A181416	June 8, 2004	While awaiting trial for the May 1984 shooting death of 24-year-old Gregory Earls in Hamilton County, Ohio, Zuern assaulted and murdered 26-year-old Sheriff's Deputy and Corrections Officer Phillip Pence with a metal shank in June. He was convicted of both murders in September and sentenced to death in October of 1984 for Pence's death. Despite his sentence being overturned in 2000, it was reinstated in 2003.
13	Stephen Allen Vrabel	A313033	July 14, 2004	On March 3, 1989, Vrabel bought a gun and used it to kill his 29-year-old girlfriend, Susan Clemente, and their 3-year-old daughter, Lisa Clemente. He placed the bodies in the refrigerator of their home while living there. After leaving the city, he later confessed to a priest before going to the police. After initially being found incompetent to stand trial and five years of confinement in a mental hospital, Vrabel was now competent and could participate in his trial. He was convicted and sentenced to death in 1995.
14	Scott Andrew Mink	A413511	July 20, 2004	On September 19, 2000, 37-year-old Mink brutally murdered his parents, 79-year-old William Mink and 72-year-old Sheila Mink, using a hammer and cutting boards that all broke before stabbing both and strangling his mother with an electric cord. Mink stole their credit cards and belongings to purchase crack cocaine. His sister found the bodies four days later. Mink was later convicted and sentenced to death in 2001.
15	Adremy Dennis	A306133	October 13, 2004	On June 4, 1994, 18-year-old Dennis and his co-conspirator, 17-year-old Leroy Anderson, approached a cookout hosted by 29-year-old Kurt Kyle in an attempt to rob the guests. Anderson held a partygoer at gunpoint while he robbed him for $15 while Dennis demanded Kyle handover any money he had. When Kyle showed he had no money on him, Dennis shot him in the facial region with a sawed-off shotgun severing his carotid arteries. He was convicted in 1994 and sentenced to death in 1995 for the murder of Kyle. Anderson was later paroled after serving a sentenced of life with the possibility of parole after 25 years.
16	William Henry Smith	A202636	March 8, 2005	After not hearing from her the whole day, the body of 47-year-old Mary Virginia Bradford had been found in September 1987 by her boyfriend. She had been raped before her death and received ten stab wounds, five of which would have been fatal. The previous day Bradford and Smith were seen at a local bar they frequented often. After police obtained a search warrant for his mother's house, they found two of Bradford's television sets as well as clothing and shoes, both contaminated with blood that was a match to Bradford. He was convicted and sentenced to death in 1988.
17	Herman Ashworth	A348155	September 27, 2005	While going bar hopping in September 1996, Ashworth murdered Daniel Baker, a divorced father of one, after Baker allegedly sexual advances towards him. After the alleged advances, Ashworth took Baker into an alley where he assaulted him with his fists, feet, and a 6-foot board. After returning with his girlfriend and discovering Baker still alive, Ashworth continued the beating to kill Baker. After calling in an anonymous tip about the body, the call was traced leading to the investigation against Ashworth. He was convicted and sentenced to death in 1997.
18	Willie Williams	A256583	October 25, 2005	After being acquitted of a 1981 murder, 34-year-old Williams returned to his neighborhood to find that several other rival drug dealers had taken over. Enlisting the help of his 16-year-old girlfriend Jessica M. Cherry, her brother Dominic M. Cherry, and her 17-year-old "cousin" Broderick Boone, Williams decided to murder the three dealers. In 1991, the co-conspirators lured and trapped the three dealers and a visitor, all aged 20 to 23 years old, in the Youngstown, Ohio. home before Williams strangled two of them and shot all four in the head. Police soon after apprehended the co-conspirators and sent them to the Mahoning County Juvenile Justice Center. Williams later tricked the receptionist into letting him into the facility before holding the receptionist and a sheriff's deputy hostage with the intent to kill the three juveniles. He later surrendered and was charged with the four murders. He was convicted and sentenced to death in 1993.
19	John R. Hicks	A189423	November 29, 2005	On August 2, 1985, Hicks had attempted to use the family VCR to use as a security deposit to obtain cocaine. After realizing he did not have any cash after and his wife would be upset about this, Hicks decided to rob and kill his mother-in-law, 56-year-old Maxine Armstrong. After calling to let her know he was coming over and putting his stepdaughter to bed, he strangled Armstrong to death from behind before ensuring she was dead by strangling her further with a length of clothesline. After he stole $300 and credit cards from her house, Hicks realized his stepdaughter would place him at the scene of the crime. He then attempted to smother and strangle his stepdaughter, 5-year-old Brandy Green. When this failed to work, he applied duct tape to her mouth and nose. He then attempted to dismember Armstrong's corpse, but gave up after failing to amputate her leg. He then returned to Green's body and digital raped her with his finger. After stealing more items from the house, he fled the city of Cincinnati, Ohio, and was found in Knoxville, Tennessee, two days later. He was convicted of both murders and sentenced to death for Green's murder in 1986.
20	Glenn Lee Benner II	A190672	February 7, 2006	On August 6, 1985, Benner abducted 26-year-old Cynthia Sedgwick in Summit County, Ohio, where he raped and choked her to death. On January 2, 1986, Benner kidnapped 21-year-old Trina Bowser in Akron, Ohio, before raping and killing her too. During his 1986 trial, he was convicted of both murders as well as two other previous incidents of attempted murders and rapes similar to Sedgwick and Bowser's deaths. He was sentenced to death in 1986.
21	Joseph Lewis Clark	A183984	May 2, 2006	After robbing a Toledo gas station for $60 in 1984, Clark shot and killed the attendant, 22-year-old David Manning. After being arrested for an assault and robbery at a bank, the arresting officer took possession of the handgun Clark had with him. After being informed he was also being investigated for the Manning murder, Clark attempted suicide. Later on, he also confessed to the murder of another convenience store clerk, Donald Harris, the day before killing Manning. He was convicted and sentenced to death for Manning's murder in 1984. He was later sentenced to life without the possibility of parole for the murder of Harris in 1987.
22	Rocky Barton	A457297	July 12, 2006	After serving time and being paroled in 1999 for the attempted murder of his ex-wife in Kentucky, Barton killed his fourth wife, 43-year-old Kimbirli Jo Barton, on January 16th, 2003 at their home in Waynesville, Ohio. He shot her once in the shoulder and once in the back with a shotgun. While incarcerated, he was known as "Darth Vader" after having to wear a mask while in jail awaiting trial after he had attempted suicide, but only succeeded in blowing off the lower half of his face. He was convicted and sentenced to death in October 2003.
23	Darrell Wayne Ferguson	A456727	August 8, 2006	While serving time in a drug rehab facility, Ferguson was awarded a two-day pass on December 21, 2001. He did not return and instead on Christmas day, he attacked and killed 61-year-old relative Thomas King with a kitchen knife. He stole two TVs and a radio to buy crack cocaine. The next day, he broke into the home of former neighbors, 68-year-old Arlie Fugate and his wife 69-year-old Mae Fugate, before attacking them with a knife, beating them with his fists, and stomping them with his feet. During his trial, he taunted the victims' families and begged for the death penalty. He was convicted and sentenced to death in 2003.
24	Jeffrey Lundgren	A235069	October 24, 2006	In 1989, Lundgren, a leader of a Reorganized Church of Jesus Christ of Latter Day Saints movement-based cult, led his members to lure the Avery family, members of his cult, to a barn where they had previously dug a large pit. Lundgren then shot and killed all five members of the Avery family one-by-one in order of husband, wife, oldest daughter, middle daughter, and youngest daughter. The next day, officers arrived at the Lundgren residence to talk to Lundgren, but he became paranoid and afterwards, moved his entire cult to West Virginia where he left them before taking himself and his family to California. A tip came through in 1990 leading police to search the barn where the bodies were still in the mass grave. After finding members of the Lundgren cult in West Virginia, police used information gathered from them to locate the Lundgren family where they were apprehended. Jeff Lundgren was the only one to receive the death penalty while his family and several other participants received life sentences. Most other members had a sentence shorter than 25 years and two had suspended sentences. Lundgren was convicted and sentenced to death in 1990.
25	James J. Filiaggi	A311180	April 24, 2007	After being divorced from his wife in February 1993, Filiaggi began harassing his ex-wife, Lisa Huff, and her fiance through repeat telephone calls and vandalism. After being charged with intimidation, felony assault, and vandalism, Filiaggi purchased a handgun and received a cash advance through his Visa card. He gave the majority of the cash to his then girlfriend. On the night of January 24, 1994, Filiaggi then broke into his ex-wife's house while she was on the phone with the police. After escaping to a neighbor's house, Filiaggi broke into the neighbor's house, found Huff hiding in a closet, and shot her twice. She attempted to run away before he shot her twice more killing 27-year-old Lisa Huff. Afterwards, Filiaggi attempted to kill Huff's step father after. Filiaggi was convicted of the murder of Lisa Huff in January 1994 before being sentenced to death in August 1995.
26	Christopher Newton	A378452	May 24, 2007	While serving time for attempted aggravated burglary of his father's home, Newton got into a dispute with his cellmate, 27-year-old Jason Brewer, at Mansfield Correctional Institution in Mansfield, Ohio. Newton, weighing between 65 and 95 lbs more than Brewer, assaulted his cellmate by striking his head against the floor, stomping his head twice, and strangling him with an orange cloth ripped from a jumpsuit in the early morning of November 15, 2001 before smearing himself in and consuming the victim's blood. Newton gave two different reasons for the assault: the first version was because another inmate had hired to assault Brewer and the second version was because Brewer had ended a game of chess after being put in check. He was convicted of the murder and sentenced to death in 2003.
27	Richard Cooey	A194016	October 14, 2008	On September 1, 1986, then 19-year-old Cooey and his co-conspirator, then 17-year-old Clinton Dickens, murdered 21-year-old Wendy Offredo and 20-year-old Dawn McCreery in Akron, Ohio, after throwing chunks of concrete onto U.S. Interstate 77. After pretending to rescue the girls, Cooey and Dickens raped, tortured, and stabbed the victims before choking and bludgeoning them to death. Afterwards, they mutilated the bodies with carving an "X" on each body. After being convicted and sentenced to death in 1986, Cooey's case rose to attention when he claimed that his obesity would make it impossible to execute him. This claim was later proven false (See left).
28	Gregory L. Bryant-Bey	A285890	November 19, 2008	In August 1992, Bryant-Bey fatally stabbed 48-year-old Dale Pinkelman, owner of Pinky's Collectibles, in his Toledo store. Three months later, Bryant-Bey fatally stabbed 61-year-old Peter Mihas, owner of The Board Room, in the same manner. Both victims were fatally stabbed in the chest in the businesses they owned in Toledo, both had their pants removed, and both had their shoes lined up next to their bodies. After investigating Bryant-Bey for Mihas' murder, police noted similarities in the crimes as well as fingerprints present at Pinky's Collectibles that matched Bryant-Bey's. Bryant-Bey was convicted and sentenced to death in December 1993.
29	Daniel E. Wilson	A260074	June 3, 2009	After picking him up from a bar in Elyria, Ohio, in 1991, 24-year-old Carol Lutz was forced into the trunk by Wilson. After she promised she'd forget the whole incident if he let her go, he decided to puncture the gas tank and set it on fire. He walked away while she burned to death and later, Wilson claimed he had no memory of the whole incident. He was convicted and sentenced to death in 1992.
30	John Fautenberry	A279989	July 14, 2009	Fautenberry, a long-haul trucker, was alleged to have killed 5 to 6 people across four states in the years 1984, 1990, and 1991. The 1984 murder was a confession another man had already confessed and plead guilty to which investigators later abandoned. The first confirmed murder was in 1990 when he killed 47-year-old Donald Nutley from Texas in Oregon. The fifth and final confirmed victim was in 1991 when he killed 39-year-old Jefferson Diffee in Alaska. The conviction that got Fautenberry executed in Ohio was the third confirmed victim in 1991 when he killed 45-year-old Joseph Daron, Jr in Union Township Ohio. Fautenberry was sentenced to life in New Jersey and 99 years in Alaska, but because Ohio had the most severe punishment for his conviction, he was sentenced to serve his sentence in Ohio. He was convicted and sentenced to death in 1992.
31	Marvallous Matthew Keene	A286363	July 21, 2009	Keene, then 19 years old, was the main perpetrator of the 1992 Dayton Christmas Murders, a spree killing that left six dead over two days in Dayton, Ohio. The primary motivations were robbery and silencing witnesses. His co-conspirators included 20-year-old Heather Nicole Matthews, 17-year-old DeMarcus Maurice Smith, and 16-year-old Laura Jeanne Taylor were all given life sentences. Keene himself was convicted and sentenced to death in 1993. He was the 1,000th person executed by lethal injection in the U.S. since 1982.
32	Jason Getsy	A330121	August 18, 2009	Getsy was a 19-year-old hitman that was paid $5,000 by John Santine to kill Charles Serafino. On July 7, 1995, Getsy shot Charles' mother, 66-year-old Ann Serafino, in Hubbard, Ohio and shot Charles seven times after. His mother died, but Charles lived. Getsy was convicted and sentenced to death in 1996. The Ohio Parole Board voted 5-2 to grant Getsy clemency since other criminals of similar actions and motives were granted life sentences, but Ohio Governor Ted Strickland ultimately rejected the clemency request.
33	Kenneth Biros	A249514	December 8, 2009	After meeting an intoxicated 22-year-old Tami Engstrom in 1991 at a bar called the "Nickelodeon Lounge" in Masury, Ohio, Biros offered to take her out for coffee to sober her up. He later claimed she ran out of the car after freaking out and appeared to accidentally trip and strike her head. Biros had dismembered and disseminated her body parts across a broad area of Ohio and Pennsylvania. He made different conflicting statements about what happened and how Engstrom had died. He did admit to removing her vagina and rectum later on during trial, but stated he did not kill her. The medical examiner testified that there were 91 separate cutting or slashing wounds on what recovered body parts that were found. Biros was convicted and sentenced to death in October of the same year. When he was executed in 2009, Biros was the first condemned person to die from a single drug, sodium thiopental, confirmed by Guinness World Records.
34	Vernon Lamont Smith	A288960	January 7, 2010	On May 26, 1993, Smith was involved in a robbery where he placed a forty ounce beer on the counter before pulling a gun and telling the owner, 28-year-old Palestinian immigrant Sohail Darwish, to "open the cash register, motherfucker." After robbing the cash register, Darwish, and a previous coworker visiting Darwish, Osand Tahboub, Smith shot Darwish once in the chest before fleeing. Darwish bled out soon after. Smith's co-conspirators, a getaway driver and another burglar, later testified against Smith ultimately resulting in a conviction and death sentence in March of 1994.
35	Mark Aaron Brown	A320827	February 4, 2010	In January 1994, Brown and a juvenile co-conspirator, Allen Thomas, were intoxicated from the effects of marijuana and wine laced with Valium where they got the idea to recreate a scene in the movie "Menace II Society," where a convenience store owned by Asian immigrants in a predominantly black neighborhood is robbed. They recreated this by robbing a convenience store owned by an Arab man. During the robbery, Brown shot and killed 32-year-old Isam Salman, son of the store owner, and 30-year-old Hayder Al Tuyrk. After police arrested Brown and found the handgun nearby that matched shell casings at the scene, Brown confessed to the murder of Tuyrk, but denied killing Salman. He was convicted and sentenced to death in 1996.
36	Lawrence Raymond Reynolds, Jr	A296121	March 16, 2010	In January 1994, 27-year-old Reynolds, an alcoholic out of work, wanted money to buy alcohol. For several weeks prior, he had been harassing 67-year-old Loretta Mae Foster about $200 she allegedly owed him for painting the basement. After making his way into the Cuyahoga Falls home, Reynolds strangled Foster and stole $40 and a blank check from her home. When she was discovered, she had been beaten, tied up, and was almost naked in the living room of her home. Reynolds had been bragging about killing her to multiple people. He was convicted and sentenced to death five months after the murder.
37	Darryl M. Durr	A207889	April 20, 2010	On February 1st, 1988, 24-year-old Durr kidnapped 16-year-old Angel Vincent from her parents' home. He raped her before deciding to strangle her with a dog chain. Durr hid the corpse in two orange traffic barrels put together in a park in Cleveland, Ohio. Later, his teenage girlfriend, Deborah Mullins, gave birth to a daughter he named Angel and he made his girlfriend model the jeans he stole from Vincent's body. Durr was connected to Vincent's murder after he was arrested on two unrelated rapes in September 1988. His girlfriend later testified she was in the car with Vincent, but feared saying anything for months believing Durr would harm her if she told anyone. He was convicted and sentenced to death in December 1988.
38	Michael Francis Beuke	A176128	May 13, 2010	On May 14, 1983, Beuke, a 21-year-old hitchhiker, shot Gregory Wahoff in Hamilton County, Ohio, leaving him for dead. Wahoff was paralyzed and died from the shooting four years later. On June 1 of the same year, Beuke later shot and killed 27-year-old Robert Craig before leaving his body in a roadside ditch near Clermont County, Ohio. Two days later, Bruce Graham offered Beuke a ride. After getting in the car, Beuke forced Graham to drive to an area in rural Indiana before shooting him as well. All three victims were shot with the same .38 revolver, but only Craig died. Beuke earned the nickname "The Mad Hitchhiker." He was latered convicted and sentenced to death in 1983.
39	William L. Garner	A264900	July 13, 2010	On a night in January 1992, 19-year-old Garner stole a purse from Addie Mack, a mother in a hospital emergency room seeking treatment. Realizing Mack would be pre-occupied, Garner found her address in her purse before taking a taxi to her house. While inside, one of her six children woke up and ask for water. Garner brought her the glass of water and allowed her to watch TV explaining that he was simply checking on the kids by request of their mother. After she went back to bed, Garner stole several items and place them into a taxi explaining he was moving out of his girlfriend's place. Realizing that the daughter would identify him, Garner set the apartment on fire believing the children would escape. Five of the six kids, aged 8 to 12 years old, died in the fire, with the only survivor being 13-year-old Rod Mack. Garner was convicted and sentenced to death in November of the same year.
40	Roderick Davie	A253718	August 10, 2010	In June 1991, Davie went to the Veterinary Companies of America warehouse in Warren, Ohio. Armed with a revolver, he ordered three employees to lay face down. He shot and instantly killed 38-year-old John Ira Coleman before turning the gun on William John Everett who survived being shot in the head, shoulder, and left arm. After running out of ammunition, Davie chased down 21-year-old Tracey Jeffries before beating her to death with a metal folding chair. Seeing Everett had escaped, Davie attempted to run him down with a truck, beat him with a stick, and then attempted to gouge his eyes out, but he still survived. Davie confessed to the crime saying he flipped out at the VCA. He was convicted and sentenced to death in 1992.
41	Michael W. Benge	A276821	October 6, 2010	Benge, a crack addict, was involved in an argument with his girlfriend, 38-year-old Judith Gabbard in January 1993. He began to beat her in the head with a tire iron until she was dead. Afterwards, he weighed her body down with concrete and threw her body into the Great Miami River while leaving her car in the nearby mud. After swimming across the river, Benge gave her credit to two black men with the intent of having them use it to manufacture evidence that two black men assaulted her. He later confessed he beat her with a tire iron, but claimed that she attempted to run him over. He as convicted and sentenced to death five months later.
42	Frank Spisak	A175472	February 17, 2011	Spisak was an American neo-Nazi serial killer that was convicted of killing three people in hopes of inciting a race war. He had a fixation with Nazism early on in life. Three years into his marriage, he sustained a head injury from a car accident where his wife testified that desired to transition into a woman named "Frankie Ann," a reference to Anne Frank, a victim of the Holocaust. During this time, Spisak had sex with men and desired to undergo hormone replacement therapy and gender reassignment surgery. After his wife left him during this period in time, Spisak would re-identify as a cisgender male. In 1982 on the campus of Cleveland State University, Spisak shot and killed two black men and one white man he believed was Jewish in three separate incidents. After being indicted, Spisak grew a toothbrush mustache, dressed like Adolf Hitler, threw Sieg Heil salutes, and carried the book Mein Kampf. His defense attorney attempted to demonstrate Spisak incompetent and move for a motion of not guilty by reason of insanity ruling. However, Spisak was demonstrated to be competent and stood trial. Spisak was convicted and sentenced to death in 1983.
43	Johnnie Roy Baston	A308174	March 10, 2011	In March 1994, 20-year-old Baston robbed and killed 53-year-old Chong-Hoon Mah, a former South Korean journalist turned business owner of Continental Wigs 'n Things in Toledo, Ohio. The body of Mah was found in the backroom with a single shot to the head by his wife later in the day after he failed to return home. Baston was in possession of several Starter jackets and several hats from the store. Upon arrest, Baston admitting to robbing the store, but claimed someone named "Ray-ray" killed Mah. Baston was convicted and sentenced to death in 1995.
44	Clarence Carter	A213146	April 12, 2011	On January 11, 1989, 26-year-old Carter, while awaiting sentencing for a previous aggravated murder charge in the Hamilton County Jail Annex, assaulted 33-year-old Johnny Allen who was being held on theft charges. The assault carried on for twenty-five minutes with Carter stopping periodically to wipe the blood from his sneakers. Allen would succumb to his injuries two weeks later. Carter would later be convicted and sentenced to death in 1989 for the murder of Allen and a life sentence with the possibility of parole after twenty years for the original aggravated murder charge.
45	Daniel Lee Bedford	A181997	May 17, 2011	On April 24, 1984, 36-year-old Bedford, who still had feelings for his ex-girlfriend, broke into 25-year-old Gwen Toepfert's apartment where her and her new boyfriend, 27-year-old John Smith, were sleeping. Bedford shop both with a handgun and when Toepfert ran to her roommate's room saying she had been shot, Bedford shot her again, but with a shotgun this time. Both her and Smith died from their injuries while Bedford ran to Tennessee where he was later apprehended. He was convicted and sentenced to death in 1984.
46	Reginald Brooks, Sr	A179740	November 15, 2011	In February 1982, Brooks, Sr had quit his job after years of tension of tension within the family leaving his wife, Beverly Brooks, to support the family. Ten days before he did, he plotted the murders of his three sons as revenge towards his wife. Brooks, Sr had purchased a handgun and obtained an advance on his credit card. Two days before, his wife served him divorce papers. The day of March 6, 1982 after Beverly had left for work, Brooks, Sr shot and killed 17-year-old Reginald Brooks, Jr, 15-year-old Vaughn Brooks, and 11-year-old Niarchos Brooks. He then fled to Las Vegas before being apprehended in Utah with the murder weapon in his possession. Brooks, Sr was convicted and sentenced to death in 1983. When asked if he had any final words, he said none, but flipped off the witness area with both hands.
47	Mark Wayne Wiles	A189200	April 18, 2012	Wiles was employed as a part-time laborer for the Klimas on their farm in Rootstown Township, Ohio. Suspected of stealing $200 from the family, Wiles disappeared and did not return to collect his final paycheck. After most of the family left the house in 1985, Wiles broke in to rob them of valuables when he was confronted by 15-year-old Mark Klima. A scuffle ensued and Wiles stabbed Klima 24 times with a knife. He fled to Savannah, Georgia, with $260 he stole from the house. He would later confess and turn himself in. Wiles was convicted and sentenced to death in 1986.
48	Donald L. Palmer, Jr	A215600	September 20, 2012	In May of 1989, Palmer and his accomplice, Edward Hill, were stalking the house of a man that had once dated Palmer's ex-wife. While doing so, Hill struck the car of 43-year-old Charles W. Sponhaltz before Palmer shot him in the head twice. A passing motorist, 41-year-old Steven R. Vargo, asked what happened before Palmer shot him twice in the head as well. Sponhaltz's body was dumped in a field after, but Vargo's corpse remained in the street. After being arrested, Palmer confessed. He was convicted and sentenced to death in October of that year. Hill was sentenced to life with the possibility of parole after 35 years.
49	Brett Xavier Hartman	A357869	November 13, 2012	On September 9, 1997, 23-year-old Hartman met with 46-year-old Wanda Snipes at a bar in Akron, Ohio. They went back to Snipes' apartment where they engaged in sexual intercourse. After making several anonymous 911 calls, Hartman stood across the road and watched police find Snipes' body. She was found to have been stabbed and assaulted with a knife 138 times including having had her throat slit and hands removed of which they were never recovered. When police approached him, Hartman said that Snipes was a "psycho bitch" that deserved what she got and she had refused anal sex with him. Hartman was convicted and sentenced to death in 1998.
50	Frederick Treesh	A307703	March 6, 2013	In August of 1994, 30-year-old Treesh had been driving with his co-conspirators, Keisha Harth, Anthony Washington, and Benjamin Brooks, in hopes of finding a business to rob to purchase more crack cocaine as they had smoked their supply earlier in the day. Washington had directed them to the Vine Street News, an adult bookstore, in Eastlake, Ohio. While robbing the store, Treesh had attempted to restrain the security guard, 58-year-old Henry Dupree, with his own handcuffs, but a struggle had ensued and Treesh shot Dupree twice in the chest. While running from the store with the money from the cash register, Treesh had shot at the cashier, Louis Lauver striking him twice, but non-fatally. Lauver managed to call for emergency services, but Dupree died at the scene from blood loss. At the time, Treesh and Brooks were on the run for robbery, theft, sexual assault, and another homicide during a bank robbery in Michigan that lead them through several states. Treesh was convicted and sentenced to death in 1995.
51	Steven T. Smith	A369054	May 1, 2013	On September 29, 1998, while residing with his girlfriend, Kesha Frye, and her two children, 31-year-old Smith, naked and intoxicated, layed the naked and lifeless corpse of 6-month-old Autumn Breeze Carter onto her mother's chest. Frye took Carter and her 2-year-old child to a neighbor's house before calling 911. When police arrived, they arrived Smith who claimed he didn't assault the child and he wasn't "sick like that." He was convicted and sentenced to death in 1999.
52	Harris Mitts, Jr	A305433	September 25, 2013	Mitts was the perpetrator of the 1994 Garfield Heights double murders where he killed his neighbor's black boyfriend, 28-year-old John Bryant, in a racially motivated attack. Soon after when police arrived, Mitts engaged in a gunfight with them resulting in the death of 40-year-old Sergeant Dennis Glivar, a white police officer with the Garfield Heights Police Department. Mitts also shot two additional responding officers, but they survived their injuries. Mitts was convicted and sentenced to death later that same year.
53	Dennis McGuire	A305892	January 16, 2014	McGuire had been a death row inmate for over nineteen years for the 1989 rape and murder of 22-year-old Joy Stewart in West Alexandria, Ohio. After running out of sodium thiopental, the Ohio Department of Rehabilitation and Correction had approved the use of a new drug combination for executions: midazolam and hydromorphone. After an Ohio state prosecutor said that McGuire was not necessarily and automatically entitled to a painless execution, a judge allowed the execution to proceed. After being injected with the drug combination, McGuire was reportedly seen and heard snorting, choking, and gasping for air. The execution took approximately twenty-six minutes, over three times longer than the standard eight minutes it took for previous inmates condemned to lethal injection to die. After the execution was finished, the state did not execute another inmate for three years and abandoned the two-drug combination in favor of a new three-drug combination: midazolam, rocuronium bromide, and potassium chloride.
54	Ronald Phillips	A279109	July 26, 2017	On January 18, 1993, after a history of prolonged child abuse physically and sexually, 19-year-old Phillips raped and murdered the 3-year-old daughter, Sheila Evans, of his girlfriend, Fae Amanda Evans. He was convicted and sentenced to death later that year meanwhile she was sentenced to a maximum of thirty years for her involvement and later died in prison. Phillips was the first inmate after McGuire to be executed in the state following complications from the two-drug combination. After multiple delays including asking if he could donate his organs post-mortem, Phillips was executed on July 26, 2017 with the new three-drug combination with no further complications.
55	Gary Otte	A264667	September 13, 2017	Otte was the perpetrator of the February 1992 murders of 61-year-old Robert Wasikowski and 45-year-old Sharon Kostura in which he killed both in back-to-back robberies in Parma, Ohio. After being convicted and sentenced to death in 1992, he attempted a stay-of-execution similar to Phillips. Otte joined in a lawsuit with him as well as another inmate, Raymond Tibbetts. After the failed stay of execution in June 2017 and the successful execution of Phillips in July 2017, Otte was executed in September 2017.
56	Robert Van Hook	A186347	July 18, 2018	After visiting a bar in Cincinnati, Ohio, popular among gay men in February 1985, 25-year-old Van Hook met 25-year-old David Self. They ending up leaving together and going towards Self's apartment in Hyde Park. After arriving, Van Hook strangled and stabbed Self before mutilating his body, ransacking the apartment, stealing jewelry, and fleeing to Fort Lauderdale, Florida. Van Hook's case claimed notoriety after claiming the gay panic defense which failed. He was convicted and sentenced to death in July 1985 after being apprehended. Van Hook was the last death row inmate executed in the state of Ohio and the last inmate executed with the three-drug combination.

== See also ==
- Capital punishment in Ohio
