= Reginald Perkins =

Executed American serial killer (1955–2009)

- Perkins shortly before his execution
- Born: April 29, 1955; Woodruff County, Arkansas, U.S.
- Died: January 22, 2009 (aged 53); Huntsville Unit, Texas, U.S.
- Status: Executed by lethal injection
- Convictions: Ohio: Rape; Attempted rape; Gross sexual imposition; Texas: Capital murder (1 count)
- Penalty: Ohio: Life imprisonment; Texas: Death (March 22, 2002)

Details
- Victims: 3–6
- Span of crimes: 1980–2000
- Country: United States
- States: Ohio (confirmed rapes, alleged murders) and Texas

Reginald Perkins (April 29, 1955 – January 22, 2009) was an American serial killer and sex offender who was executed in Texas for the December 2000 murder of his stepmother. He was also linked with DNA to the murders of two women in Fort Worth in 1991, and he is suspected of killing a further three women in Ohio in the early 1980s.

== Early life ==
Perkins was born on April 29, 1955, in Woodruff County, Arkansas. He left Arkansas at a young age and grew up in Texas. In the 1970s, he moved to Cleveland, Ohio to be closer to his mother. He worked several jobs as a laborer, plumber, and truck driver.

== Murders ==
=== Ohio ===
In 1979, Perkins began dating Ramola Nelson Washington, who moved out of her home to live with him in 1980. On April 4, 1980, Perkins raped a 12-year-old girl in an abandoned house located on the East Side of Cleveland. The girl was a friend of his younger sister. Months later, Washington asked Perkins to return a set of keys to her sister, 21-year-old Paula Nelson. Five days later, on October 23, 1980, Nelson was found strangled to death in her bedroom in Cleveland. According to Washington, a few days before Nelson's body was found, she had overheard Perkins talking to his brother about Nelson and that something had happened to her.

On December 13, 1980, Perkins attempted to rape another 12-year-old girl, who was the daughter of a neighbor of his. Perkins was stopped before carrying out the attack but warned that he would kill anyone who learned about the assault. On January 4, 1981, the body of 43-year-old Jennie Morman was found in her apartment. She had been strangled to death with a scarf, and her face was covered with two pillows. Perkins had been dating Morman's daughter with whom he later had a child. On January 23, 1981, Jerry Dean Thomas, Perkins's neighbor and the mother of the 12-year-old girl he had attempted to rape, was found strangled to death. Her body was located in her basement, and she had been strangled to death with a hairdryer cord. Days before her murder, she had learned about the attempted rape of her daughter by Perkins.

Perkins was questioned about the murders by Cleveland police. On November 12, 1981, Perkins was convicted of the April 1980 rape and December 1980 attempted rape of both 12-year-old girls in Cleveland. He was sentenced to life in prison. There was not enough evidence at the time, however, to link him to the three murders.

=== Texas ===
In 1990, Perkins was paroled and moved to Fort Worth, Texas. On May 6, 1991, the bodies of 79-year-old Hattie Wilson and her niece, 44-year-old Shirley Douglas, were found inside Wilson's apartment in Fort Worth. Both had been strangled to death. At the time, Perkins had been dating the granddaughter of Wilson. In 1993, Perkins returned to prison in Ohio for failing to attend classes for sex offenders. In 1999, an Ohio court classified him as a sexual predator. In 2000, Perkins was paroled and went back to Texas to work as a truck driver for his father and stepmother's company.

On December 4, 2000, 64-year-old Gertie Mae Perkins, Reginald's stepmother, failed to collect her grandson from school. As such, she was reported missing. Her home was searched, and police discovered a disconnected phone, carpet removed from the floor, and several missing sheets. The same day, Perkins pawned a wedding ring that belonged to her. Perkins was arrested for failing to register as a sex offender a day later. Perkins was questioned by police due to his history and led authorities to Gertie's car, where her body was found in the vehicle's trunk.

== Trial and revelation ==
Perkins was indicted and tried in Tarrant County. Because of his history, the prosecution attempted to seek the death penalty. They brought in witnesses to testify about the three unsolved murder cases in Cleveland and how Perkins was the likely perpetrator. According to Ramola Washington, Perkins called her from jail and admitted to murdering her sister, Paula Nelson, back in 1980. She claimed he had begged for her forgiveness. While awaiting trial, Perkins allegedly confessed to another inmate that he killed Gertie and beat her to death before robbing her.

Ultimately, Perkins was found guilty of murder. On March 4, 2002, Perkins was convicted of the capital murder of Gertie Mae Perkins. On March 22, 2002, he was sentenced to death.

In November 2008, DNA tests linked Perkins to the May 1991 murders of Wilson and Douglas in Fort Worth, proving his guilt in those killings.

== Execution ==
On January 22, 2009, Perkins was executed via lethal injection at the Huntsville Unit in Huntsville, Texas. He was pronounced dead at 6:24 p.m. About an hour before his execution was due, he called a prison official to his cell and gave him a statement in which he proclaimed his innocence. Kevin Rousseau, the attorney who prosecuted Perkins, said he was nothing more than "a consummate liar and a con artist."

== See also ==
- Capital punishment in Texas
- Capital punishment in the United States
- List of people executed in Texas, 2000–2009
- List of people executed in the United States in 2009
- List of serial killers in the United States
