= List of people executed in Ohio =

The following is a list of people executed by the U.S. state of Ohio since capital punishment was resumed in the United States in 1976.

A total 56 people have been executed for murder since the Gregg v. Georgia decision. All of them were executed by lethal injection. However, any future execution will no longer be performed using this method, due to a ruling by Governor Mike DeWine in December 2020. Notable persons executed in Ohio before the Gregg decision include Anna Marie Hahn.

== List of people executed in Ohio since 1976 ==
No.	Name	Inmate Number	Race	Age	Sex	Date of execution	County	Method	Victim(s)	Governor
1	Wilford Lee Berry Jr.	Unlisted	White	36	M	February 19, 1999	Cuyahoga	Lethal injection	Charles Mitroff	Bob Taft
2	Jay D. Scott	Unlisted	Black	48	M	June 14, 2001	Cuyahoga	Lethal injection	Vinnie M. Price	Bob Taft
3	John William Byrd Jr.	A205901	White	38	M	February 19, 2002	Hamilton	Lethal injection	Monte Tewksbury	Bob Taft
4	Alton Coleman	A177711	Black	46	M	April 26, 2002	Hamilton	Lethal injection	Tonnie Storey and Marlene Walters	Bob Taft
5	Robert Anthony Buell	A178066	White	62	M	September 25, 2002	Wayne	Lethal injection	Krista Lea Harrison (Note: Buell was also responsible for the murder of Tina Harmon.)	Bob Taft
6	Richard Edwin Fox	A175145	White	47	M	February 12, 2003	Wood	Lethal injection	Leslie Renae Keckler	Bob Taft
7	David M. Brewer	A227307	White	44	M	April 29, 2003	Greene	Lethal injection	Sherry Byrne	Bob Taft
8	Ernest Martin	A187234	Black	42	M	June 18, 2003	Cuyahoga	Lethal injection	Robert Robinson	Bob Taft
9	Lewis Williams Jr.	A174878	Black	45	M	January 14, 2004	Cuyahoga	Lethal injection	Leoma Chmielewski	Bob Taft
10	John Glenn Roe	A176623	White	41	M	February 3, 2004	Franklin	Lethal injection	Donette Crawford	Bob Taft
11	William Dean Wickline Jr.	A183047	White	52	M	March 30, 2004	Franklin	Lethal injection	Peggy Lerch and Christopher Lerch	Bob Taft
12	William Gerald Zuern Jr.	A181416	White	45	M	June 8, 2004	Hamilton	Lethal injection	Hamilton County Deputy Sheriff Phillip Pence	Bob Taft
13	Stephen Allen Vrabel	A313033	White	47	M	July 14, 2004	Mahoning	Lethal injection	Susan Clemente and Lisa Clemente	Bob Taft
14	Scott Andrew Mink	A413511	White	40	M	July 20, 2004	Montgomery	Lethal injection	William Mink and Sheila Mink	Bob Taft
15	Adremy Dennis	A306133	Black	28	M	October 13, 2004	Summit	Lethal injection	Kurt Kyle	Bob Taft
16	William Henry Smith	A202636	Black	47	M	March 8, 2005	Hamilton	Lethal injection	Mary Bradford	Bob Taft
17	Herman Dale Ashworth	A348155	White	32	M	September 27, 2005	Licking	Lethal injection	Daniel L. Baker	Bob Taft
18	William James "Flip" Williams Jr.	A256583	Black	48	M	October 25, 2005	Summit	Lethal injection	4 murder victims (Note: The 4 victims were: William Dent, Alfonda R. Madison Sr., Eric Howard, and Theodore Wynn Jr.)	Bob Taft
19	John R. Hicks	A189423	Black	49	M	November 29, 2005	Hamilton	Lethal injection	Brandy Green and Maxine Armstrong	Bob Taft
20	Glenn Lee Benner II	A190672	White	43	M	February 7, 2006	Summit	Lethal injection	Trina Bowser and Cynthia Sedgwick	Bob Taft
21	Joseph Lewis Clark	A183984	Black	57	M	May 2, 2006	Lucas	Lethal injection	David A. Manning and Donald B. Harris	Bob Taft
22	Rocky Lee Barton	A457297	White	49	M	July 12, 2006	Warren	Lethal injection	Kimbirli Jo Barton	Bob Taft
23	Darrell Wayne Ferguson	A456727	White	28	M	August 8, 2006	Montgomery	Lethal injection	Thomas King, Arlie Fugate, and Mae Fugate	Bob Taft
24	Jeffrey Don Lundgren	A235069	White	56	M	October 24, 2006	Lake	Lethal injection	5 murder victims (Note: The 5 victims were: Dennis Avery, Cheryl Avery, Trina Avery, Rebecca Avery, and Karen Avery.)	Bob Taft
25	James J. Filiaggi	A311180	White	41	M	April 24, 2007	Lorain	Lethal injection	Lisa Huff Filiaggi	Ted Strickland
26	Christopher J. Newton	A378452	White	37	M	May 24, 2007	Richland	Lethal injection	Jason Brewer	Ted Strickland
27	Richard Wade Cooey II	A194016	White	41	M	October 14, 2008	Summit	Lethal injection	Wendy Offredo and Dawn McCreery	Ted Strickland
28	Gregory Bryant-Bey	A285890	Black	53	M	November 19, 2008	Summit	Lethal injection	Dale Pinkelman and Pete Mihas	Ted Strickland
29	Daniel E. Wilson	A260074	White	39	M	June 3, 2009	Lorain	Lethal injection	Carol Lutz	Ted Strickland
30	John Joseph Fautenberry	A279989	White	46	M	July 14, 2009	Hamilton	Lethal injection	5 murder victims (Note: The 5 victims were: Joseph Daron Jr., Jefferson Difee, Gary Farmer, Christine Guthrie, and Donald Nutley. Fautenberry was executed for Daron's murder in Ohio, the other victims were killed in Alaska, New Jersey, and Oregon.)	Ted Strickland
31	Marvallous Matthew Keene	A286363	Black	36	M	July 21, 2009	Montgomery	Lethal injection	6 murder victims (Note: The 6 victims were: Sarah Abraham, Wendy Cottrill, Danita Gullette, Marvin Washington, Richmond Maddox, and Joseph Wilkerson. Keene was convicted of five of the murders, but not the murder of Maddox.)	Ted Strickland
32	Jason Getsy	A330121	White	33	M	August 18, 2009	Trumbull	Lethal injection	Ann Serafino	Ted Strickland
33	Kenneth Biros	A249514	White	51	M	December 8, 2009	Trumbull	Lethal injection	Tami Engstrom	Ted Strickland
34	Vernon Lamont Smith	A288960	Black	37	M	January 7, 2010	Lucas	Lethal injection	Sohail Darwish	Ted Strickland
35	Mark Aaron Brown	A320827	Black	37	M	February 4, 2010	Mahoning	Lethal injection	Hayder Al-Turk and Isam Salman	Ted Strickland
36	Lawrence Raymond Reynolds	A296121	White	43	M	March 16, 2010	Summit	Lethal injection	Loretta Foster	Ted Strickland
37	Darryl M. Durr	A207889	Black	46	M	April 20, 2010	Cuyahoga	Lethal injection	Angel Vincent	Ted Strickland
38	Michael Francis Beuke	A176128	White	48	M	May 13, 2010	Hamilton	Lethal injection	Robert Craig	Ted Strickland
39	William L. Garner	A264900	Black	37	M	July 13, 2010	Hamilton	Lethal injection	5 murder victims (Note: The 5 victims were: Deondra Freeman, Richard Gaines, Markeca Mason, Mykkila Mason, and Denitra Satterwhite.)	Ted Strickland
40	Roderick Davie	A253718	Black	38	M	August 10, 2010	Trumbull	Lethal injection	John Ira Coleman and Tracey Jeffreys	Ted Strickland
41	Michael W. Benge	A276821	White	49	M	October 6, 2010	Butler	Lethal injection	Judith Gabbard	Ted Strickland
42	Frank G. Spisak Jr.	A175472	White	59	M	February 17, 2011	Cuyahoga	Lethal injection	Rev. Horace Rickerson, Brian Warford, and Timothy Sheehan	John Kasich
43	Johnnie Roy Baston	A308174	Black	37	M	March 10, 2011	Lucas	Lethal injection	Chong-Hoon Mah	John Kasich
44	Clarence Carter	A213146	Black	49	M	April 12, 2011	Hamilton	Lethal injection	Johnny Allen	John Kasich
45	Daniel Lee Bedford	A181997	White	63	M	May 17, 2011	Hamilton	Lethal injection	Gwen Toepfert and John Smith	John Kasich
46	Reginald Brooks Sr.	A179740	Black	66	M	November 15, 2011	Cuyahoga	Lethal injection	Reginald Brooks Jr., Vaughn Brooks, and Niarchos Brooks	John Kasich
47	Mark Wayne Wiles	A189200	White	49	M	April 18, 2012	Portage	Lethal injection	Mark Klima	John Kasich
48	Donald L. Palmer	A215600	White	47	M	September 20, 2012	Belmont	Lethal injection	Charles Sponhaltz and Steven Vargo	John Kasich
49	Brett Xavier Hartman	A357869	White	38	M	November 13, 2012	Summit	Lethal injection	Winda Snipes	John Kasich
50	Frederick Treesh	A307703	White	48	M	March 6, 2013	Lake	Lethal injection	Henry Dupree	John Kasich
51	Steven T. Smith	A369054	White	46	M	May 1, 2013	Richland	Lethal injection	Autumn Carter	John Kasich
52	Harry D. Mitts Jr.	A305433	White	61	M	September 25, 2013	Cuyahoga	Lethal injection	Garfield Heights police Sgt. Dennis Glivar and John Bryant	John Kasich
53	Dennis B. McGuire	A305892	White	53	M	January 16, 2014	Preble	Lethal injection	Joy Stewart	John Kasich
54	Ronald Ray Phillips	A279109	White	43	M	July 26, 2017	Summit	Lethal injection	Sheila Marie Evans	John Kasich
55	Gary Wayne Otte	A264667	White	45	M	September 13, 2017	Cuyahoga	Lethal injection	Robert Wasikowski and Sharon Kostura	John Kasich
56	Robert J. Van Hook	A186347	White	58	M	July 18, 2018	Hamilton	Lethal injection	David Lyman Self	John Kasich

== Demographics ==
Race
White	37	66%
Black	19	34%
Age
20–29	2	4%
30–39	13	23%
40–49	29	52%
50–59	8	14%
60–69	4	7%
Sex
Male	56	100%
Date of execution
1976–1979	0	0%
1980–1989	0	0%
1990–1999	1	2%
2000–2009	32	57%
2010–2019	23	41%
2020–2029	0	0%
Method
Lethal injection	56	100%
Governor (Party)
Jim Rhodes (R)	0	0%
Dick Celeste (D)	0	0%
George Voinovich (R)	0	0%
Nancy Hollister (R)	0	0%
Bob Taft (R)	24	43%
Ted Strickland (D)	17	30%
John Kasich (R)	15	27%
Mike DeWine (R)	0	0%
Total	56	100%

== See also ==
- Capital punishment in Ohio
- Capital punishment in the United States
