= Kenneth Biros =

American murderer

- Born: June 24, 1958; U.S.
- Died: December 8, 2009 (aged 51); Southern Ohio Correctional Facility, Ohio, U.S.
- Status: Executed by lethal injection
- Motive: Rage
- Convictions: Aggravated murder Attempted rape Aggravated robbery Felonious sexual penetration
- Penalty: Death (October 29, 1991)

Kenneth Biros (June 24, 1958 – December 8, 2009) was an American convicted murderer who was sentenced to death and executed for the aggravated murder, attempted rape, aggravated robbery and felonious sexual penetration of a young woman. Biros was the first condemned person to be executed by lethal injection in the United States with the use of a single drug, setting a Guinness World Record.

== Murder ==
Biros admitted to killing 22-year-old Tami Engstrom during February 1991 in a fit of rage. Biros then cut up the body and spread numerous parts over a wide territory encompassing portions of northeast Ohio and northwest Pennsylvania.

== Conviction ==
Biros was convicted of aggravated murder, attempted rape, aggravated robbery and felonious sexual penetration and sentenced to death. He was originally sentenced to die by means of lethal injection at 10:00 a.m. on March 20, 2007. This would have been the first execution during Governor Ted Strickland's administration. Governor Strickland denied Biros clemency on March 16, 2007. However, on that day the Supreme Court of the United States upheld the ruling of the 6th U.S. Circuit Court of Appeals that Biros' execution should be stayed to allow him to continue to argue his case that Ohio's lethal injection is cruel and unusual punishment. He was then transferred from Ohio's death row at the Ohio State Penitentiary in Mansfield to the Southern Ohio Correctional Facility in Lucasville. On April 24, 2009, Trumbull County Prosecutor Dennis Watkins requested the Ohio Supreme Court to set an execution date after a federal judge decided on Tuesday, April 21, 2009, that Ohio's execution method was flawed, but not unconstitutional. The Supreme Court of Ohio later set a new execution date for December 8, 2009.

== Execution ==
Biros was executed by lethal injection on December 8, 2009, at 11:00 a.m. at the Southern Ohio Correctional Facility in Lucasville, Ohio. His execution was originally scheduled for 10:00 a.m., but was later delayed until 11:00 a.m. He was pronounced dead at 11:47 a.m. Biros was the first person on death row in America to be executed with a lethal dose of a single drug — in this case, sodium thiopental.

== See also ==
- List of people executed in Ohio
- List of people executed in the United States in 2009

Executions carried out in Ohio
Preceded by Jason Getsy August 18, 2009	Kenneth Biros; December 8, 2009	Succeeded by Vernon Smith January 7, 2010
Executions carried out in the United States
Preceded by Bobby Wayne Woods – Texas December 3, 2009	Kenneth Biros – Ohio; December 8, 2009	Succeeded by Matthew Wrinkles – Indiana December 11, 2009
