= Jason Getsy =

American murderer (1975–2009)

- Born: October 3, 1975
- Died: August 18, 2009 (aged 33); Southern Ohio Correctional Facility, Ohio, U.S.
- Status: Executed by lethal injection
- Convictions: Aggravated murder Attempted aggravated murder burglary
- Penalty: Death (September 12, 1996)

Jason Getsy (October 3, 1975 – August 18, 2009) was a convicted murder-for-hire triggerman in the American state of Ohio. He was executed at the age of 33 for a murder committed when he was 19.

== Murder ==
Getsy was hired by John Santine for US $5,000 to kill Charles Serafino, as well as any and all potential witnesses to the crime, in an argument over a lawn care business. On July 7, 1995, Getsy killed Charles Serafino's mother, 66-year-old Ann Serafino, in Hubbard, Ohio, and shot Charles seven times, including once in the face at point-blank range. Charles Serafino, however, survived the shooting. Getsy was 19 years old at the time of the murder.

== Conviction ==
Getsy was convicted of aggravated murder and attempted aggravated murder in 1996 and sentenced to death. Santine was convicted of the same charges the following year and received a 43-year-to-life sentence. The Ohio Parole Board voted 5–2 in favor of clemency because other people convicted in the same slaying were not sentenced to die. Ohio Governor Ted Strickland rejected the finding of the Parole Board after appeals to the Supreme Court of Ohio and the Supreme Court of the United States failed.

== Execution ==
Getsy was executed by lethal injection on Tuesday August 18, 2009, at 10:00 a.m. in the death chamber of the Southern Ohio Correctional Facility in Lucasville, Ohio. He was pronounced dead at 10:29 a.m. In an apology made prior to his execution, Getsy stated, "To Chuck and Nancy Serafino and your loved ones, for all the pain I have caused you it is my earnest prayer that God grants you peace. I am sorry. It is a little word, I know, but it is true. For everyone else, God is so great that He gave His only son that I may be forgiven of all my sins. Even today I can say how blessed I am that the Holy Spirit lives in me."

== See also ==
- Capital punishment in Ohio
- Capital punishment in the United States
- List of people executed in Ohio
- List of people executed in the United States in 2009

Executions carried out in Ohio
| Preceded by Marvallous Keene July 21, 2009 | Jason Getsy; August 18, 2009 | Succeeded by Kenneth Biros December 8, 2009 |
Executions carried out in the United States
| Preceded by Marvallous Keene – Ohio July 21, 2009 | Jason Getsy – Ohio; August 18, 2009 | Succeeded by John Marek – Florida August 19, 2009 |
