= John Fautenberry =

American serial killer

- Born: July 4, 1963; New London, Connecticut, U.S.
- Died: July 14, 2009 (aged 46); Southern Ohio Correctional Facility, Ohio, U.S.
- Status: Executed by lethal injection
- Convictions: Ohio; Aggravated murder New Jersey; Murder; Alaska; First degree murder
- Penalty: Ohio; Death; New Jersey; Life imprisonment Alaska; 99 years imprisonment

Details
- Victims: 5–6
- Span of crimes: 1990 – 1991 (possibly 1984)
- Country: United States
- States: Oregon, New Jersey, Ohio, Alaska
- Date apprehended: March 17, 1991

John Joseph Fautenberry (July 4, 1963 – July 14, 2009) was an American serial killer. A long-haul trucker, Fautenberry befriended and subsequently murdered five people across four states between 1990 and 1991, and after his arrest, confessed to an additional 1984 murder for which another man was convicted. He was sentenced to death for one of his killings, and subsequently executed at the Southern Ohio Correctional Facility in 2009.

== Early life ==
Born on July 4, 1963, in New London, Connecticut, (Note: One source claims that he was born in Groton) Fautenberry's father was a former Marine and former police officer. Fautenberry's parents divorced shortly after John's sister was born. Rejected by his father and grandparents, young John was placed in the care of his mother, who went on to marry twice more. He was ignored by his stepfathers, suffering beatings for the smallest of mistakes, once for confusing a potato salad with tomato salad. According to Fautenberry, he would use an imaginary hammer to nail his and his sister's blankets to the beds, in an effort to not get taken away by malicious forces. The family often changed residences, shifting between Ohio and Hawaii before moving to North Kingstown, Rhode Island, in 1983. By that time, Fautenberry had already had run-ins with the law: he had stolen a 1968 Chrysler in Atlanta, but was later captured in Heflin, Alabama, after leaving a gas station without paying for gas.

In 1985, his mother died of cancer, leading Fautenberry to become even more disillusioned and untrusting of people, with him developing a growing addiction to drugs and alcohol. In order to support himself, he held several short-term jobs as a long-haul trucker, travelling all across the United States, but was often fired for poor performance and negligence. By the time his murders began, he acquired several more convictions for minor offenses, including carrying a concealed weapon in Ohio and a public disturbance charge in Ledyard, Connecticut.

With the help of his birth father he moved to Portland, Oregon in 1986. Shortly after arriving in Portland John Jr's father moved out of the house, taking John Jr's two half brothers to southern Oregon. At that time, John Jr. started having an affair with his stepmother, Olivia Herndon. John Sr. and Olivia finally divorced; John Jr. and Olivia continued their relationship for many years. While they never married, they were together for nearly 15 years, even while he was incarcerated.

== Murders ==
Fautenberry's first confirmed victim was 47-year-old Donald 'Don' Nutley, from Waco, Texas. The pair crossed paths in November 1990 at a truck stop in Troutdale, Oregon, and upon learning that Nutley was going to Mount Hood for target practice, Fautenberry offered to accompany him. Don agreed, and the two men traveled to the area, where Nutley promptly vanished. His disappearance remained a mystery until April 21, 1991, when his teeth and skull, complete with a bullet hole, were found in a wooded area northeast of rural Zigzag.

On February 1, 1991, Fautenberry encountered 27-year-old fellow trucker Gary Farmer, from Springfield, Tennessee, at the Pilot Truck Stop in Bloomsbury, New Jersey, not far from the I-78. According to Fautenberry, Farmer supposedly made unwanted sexual advances on him, because of which he killed him in retaliation, robbing Farmer of a knife, watch and $40, before leaving his body in the truck's sleeping compartment. Farmer's body was found on February 5 and remained unidentified for a few days, and after his identity was recovered, authorities released a sketch of a man wanted for questioning in his death. According to his employers, CPA America, Farmer was on a cross-country route bound for Hunterdon County at the time of his death. At the time of the murder, Fautenberry was travelling towards Zion, Illinois, and had stopped at the truck stop to have breakfast.

Sixteen days later, 45-year-old Joseph Daron Jr., a divorced father and data supervisor at the Community Mutual Blue Cross Blue Shield, went missing from his Miami Township home in Ohio, after dropping off his two daughters at their mothers' home in Union Township. Two days after, a co-worker filed a missing persons report. After some time passed, Daron still hadn't been located, but, strangely enough, his white 1988 Subaru had been spotted in Portland, Oregon, and Idaho, in addition to that his credit cards had been used a total of 25 times by none other than Fautenberry himself. On March 20, a motorist pulled off the road near River Downs in Anderson Township, finding the body of a man. Judging by the man's clothing and physical description, it was quickly concluded that the deceased was Joseph Daron. Posing as a hitchhiker, Fautenberry was picked up by the good-natured Daron, proceeding to kill and rob him afterwards.

Using Daron's car, Fautenberry criss-crossed through several states before finding himself at a party in Portland on February 23, where he met 32-year-old local bank teller Christine Anne Guthrie. She agreed to accompany John to the coastal Silver Sands Motel in Rockaway Beach, where the pair were seen by hotel owner Anna Modrell. Following their meet-up, Guthrie vanished, with her body found on April 1 near the remote logging community of Timber. She had died from gunshot wounds to the head.

From there, Fautenberry drove to the Seattle–Tacoma International Airport, abandoning Daron's car at the parking lot. He bought a one-way ticket to Juneau, Alaska, arriving there on March 2 or 3rd, finding work on a fishing boat and moving into the downtown Bergman Hotel. On March 14, he was hanging out at a rural bar, having been fired from his job at the fishing boat, when he came across 39-year-old Jefferson "Jeff" Diffee, a miner who worked at the Greens Creek silver mine. The two struck up a conversation, and Diffee, feeling sorry for the newcomer who wasn't accustomed to the Alaskan wilderness, invited Fautenberry to his condominium. There, Fautenberry proceeded to beat and stab him 17–18 times, before stealing Diffee's wallet, ATM card and 9mm handgun. The following day, he withdrew $400 from Diffee's account, a move noted by authorities. In the meantime, co-workers had filed a missing persons report for Diffee, who hadn't gone to work in two days.

== Arrest, trial and imprisonment ==
Three days after killing Diffee, Fautenberry, who had been under surveillance since his linkage to Joseph Daron's stolen car, was arrested at his hotel room in Juneau. Jeff's bank card was found in his hotel room as well. During the course of his interrogations, Fautenberry confessed a total of six murders, including the 1984 stabbing death of 25-year-old homeless man Richard F. Combs in Roseburg, Oregon. According to Fautenberry, the two met in a park and began drinking, and as John drank more, he got angrier at the fact that he had recently been fired from his job. In a fit of rage, he supposedly stabbed Combs in the throat and dumped his body on the freeway. However, another man was already serving a sentence for that crime: 28-year-old Michael T. Collier had confessed and pleaded guilty to manslaughter in the Combs case, but had since recanted. The lead concerning Fautenberry was investigated, but in the end, it was abandoned. He was also briefly considered a suspect in the Dr. No murders due to his job as a long-haul trucker, and even questioned about the slaying of a fellow truck driver in New York, but was eventually cleared of suspicion. After a tape-recorded telephone interview with WKRC-TV, in which he confessed to four of his murders, Fautenberry attempted suicide by cutting his wrist with a razor, but was found in time and saved.

During his imprisonment, Fautenberry was profiled as a serial killer according to the FBI's definition, with newspapers drawing comparisons to other murderers, such as Ted Bundy, Richard Biegenwald and the recently captured Eric Napoletano. Fautenberry himself denied being one, as he believed he didn't fit the criteria, as he murdered for money, not for sexual or personal satisfaction.

Fautenberry was held at the Lemon Creek Correctional Center in Juneau, initially on a $1 million bail, which was increased to $3 million following additional charges. He was indicted for the murders of Diffee, Farmer and Daron, and remained in Alaska for his first trial. In exchange for the other charges being dropped, he pleaded guilty to killing Diffee and was given a 99-year prison term in Alaska. He was then extradited to Ohio, where he was sentenced to death for the murder of Joseph Daron, and sent off to await execution at the Southern Ohio Correctional Facility. In September of that year, he was extradited to New Jersey, where he pleaded guilty to murder in the Farmer case, and was given a life sentence.

=== Execution ===
Following his death sentence, as per Ohio law, Fautenberry automatically filed for appeal on several occasions, but every time, he was unsuccessful. By 2008, when Fautenberry had exhausted all of his state and federal appeals, prosecutor Joe Deters formally requested his execution. His bids for clemency were also denied, as a result of protest from family members of his victims.

On July 14, 2009, he was executed by lethal injection at the Southern Ohio Correctional Facility, about two hours after the Supreme Court denied a final request to delay the procedure.

== See also ==
- Dr. No
- List of people executed in Ohio
- List of people executed in the United States in 2009
- List of serial killers in the United States
