= Alva Campbell =

American convicted of murder

- Campbell in 1998
- Born: Alva Earl Campbell Jr. April 30, 1948; Ohio, U.S.
- Died: March 3, 2018 (aged 69); Chillicothe, Ohio, US
- Status: Deceased
- Convictions: Aggravated murder First degree murder Shooting with intent to kill Kidnapping (2 counts); Felonious assault (3 counts); Aggravated robbery (11 counts); Aggravated burglary Armed robbery (3 counts); Grand larceny Escape; Having weapons while under disability
- Penalty: Life imprisonment (November 2, 1972); Death (April 10, 1998)

Details
- Victims: William Dovalosky; Charles Dials
- Date: April 21, 1972; April 2, 1997

Alva Earl Campbell Jr. (April 30, 1948 – March 3, 2018) was an American murderer from Ohio at the Chillicothe Correctional Institution in Chillicothe, Ohio. He was convicted of the 1997 carjacking, kidnapping, and murder of 18-year-old Charles Dials in Franklin County. Campbell was on parole for a previous murder conviction at the time.

== Background ==
Campbell was born on April 30, 1948, one of six siblings. He suffered an abusive home life. From 1959 to 1965, Campbell was placed in "two different residential treatment facilities in Pennsylvania, nine separate detention center placements [and] two different foster homes." His father was committed to the Lima State Hospital for raping one of Campbell's sisters. Campbell's mother was complicit in prostituting Campbell's sisters in exchange for money and alcohol when the girls were teenagers, and one of Campbell's sisters became pregnant at age 15. Campbell and his sisters were finally removed from their mother's care after the children entered a bar and begged for food.

Campbell's earliest recorded offenses, according to the Ohio Department of Rehabilitation and Correction, were three counts of armed robbery, one of grand larceny, and one of shooting with the intent to kill. All of the charges originated in three different counties. He was sentenced to an unspecified amount of prison time in June 1968, aged 20. Campbell was convicted of the murder of an adult male in the course of a robbery in November 1972 and served 20 years in prison before being paroled in 1992. As a result of his prior criminal history, Campbell was regarded by Franklin County Prosecutor Ron O'Brien as "the poster child for the death penalty".

== Murder of Charles Dials ==
On April 2, 1997, Campbell, feigning paralysis and thus in a wheelchair, was transported to court on an aggravated robbery charge. Upon arrival, he overpowered the sheriff's deputy responsible for transporting him, stole her gun, and fled the courthouse loading dock. Campbell then carjacked 18-year-old Charles Dials, forcing him to drive for three hours. During that time, several mentions of the pursuit of Campbell by police were made over the radio, prompting Dials to ask Campbell if the person being pursued was him. After three hours, Campbell demanded that Dials get on the floor of his truck. Dials refused, prompting Campbell to shoot him twice, killing him. Campbell fled the vehicle before being caught by police shortly after.

== Legal proceedings and aborted execution ==
Campbell was convicted of the aggravated robbery charge for which he was initially in court on October 7, 1997, six months after the death of Dials. He was convicted of Dials' murder and sentenced to death on April 10, 1998, just over a year after the killing.

In an order published by Ohio Governor John Kasich on May 1, 2017, Campbell's execution was rescheduled from September 13, 2017, to November 15, 2017, at the prescribed execution time of 10:00 a.m. EST. His clemency hearing was scheduled for October 12, 2017. The parole board returned a 11-1 vote against clemency on October 20, 2017.

After being sent to the execution room on the morning of November 15, 2017, Campbell's execution was called off due to the nature of his health problems preventing the lethal injection from occurring. Executioners were unable to successfully find a vein in which to insert the IV which would contain the lethal drugs. His execution was rescheduled for June 5, 2019.

== Death ==
On March 3, 2018, Franklin County prosecutor Ron O'Brien announced that Campbell had died of natural causes. He was 69 years old, and had cancer, lung disease, asthma, and heart problems.

== See also ==
- Capital punishment in Ohio
