= Capital punishment in Ohio =

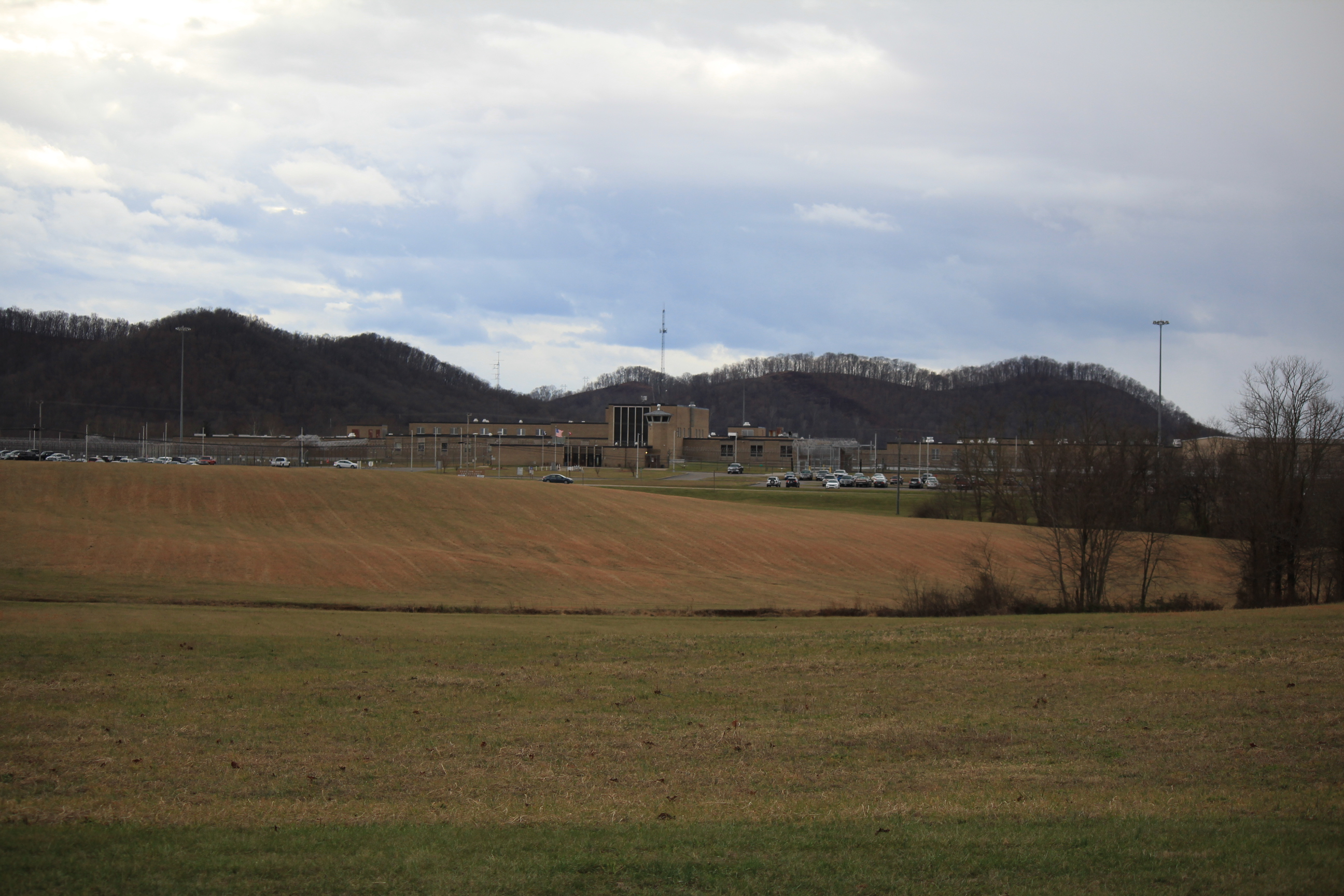
The Southern Ohio Correctional Facility is where condemned individuals in Ohio are executed.

Capital punishment is a legal penalty in the U.S. state of Ohio, although executions have been suspended indefinitely by Governor Mike DeWine until a replacement for lethal injection is chosen by the Ohio General Assembly. The last execution in the state was on July 18, 2018, when Robert J. Van Hook was executed via lethal injection for murder.

== History ==
As of March 2026, there have been 494 executions in Ohio's history.

Before 1897, executions were carried out by hanging in the county where the crime was committed. The Northwest Territory's first criminal statutes, also known as Marietta Code, date from 1788, 15 years before Ohio's statehood in 1803. These statutes did not ensure yet any uniform means of execution, nor did they designate where the executions were to take place. The statutory change from 1815 had executions to be carried out locally and required the local sheriff to be the local executioner, and in his absence or in any case of him being impeded, the local coroner would have to substitute him. That ordeal appears to be the first statewide attempt to ensure uniform means of execution and to designate where such executions were to take place, however, it also appears to confirm legally a practice which had become institutionalized even before Ohio's statehood in 1803.

In 1885, the legislature enacted a law that required executions to be carried out at the Ohio Penitentiary in Columbus by hanging, and law handed the executioner's job to the penitentiary's warden. This practice of naming the State Prison's warden executioner seems to have continued well into the 20th Century, as can be learned from the 1938 death sentence against Anna Marie Hahn.

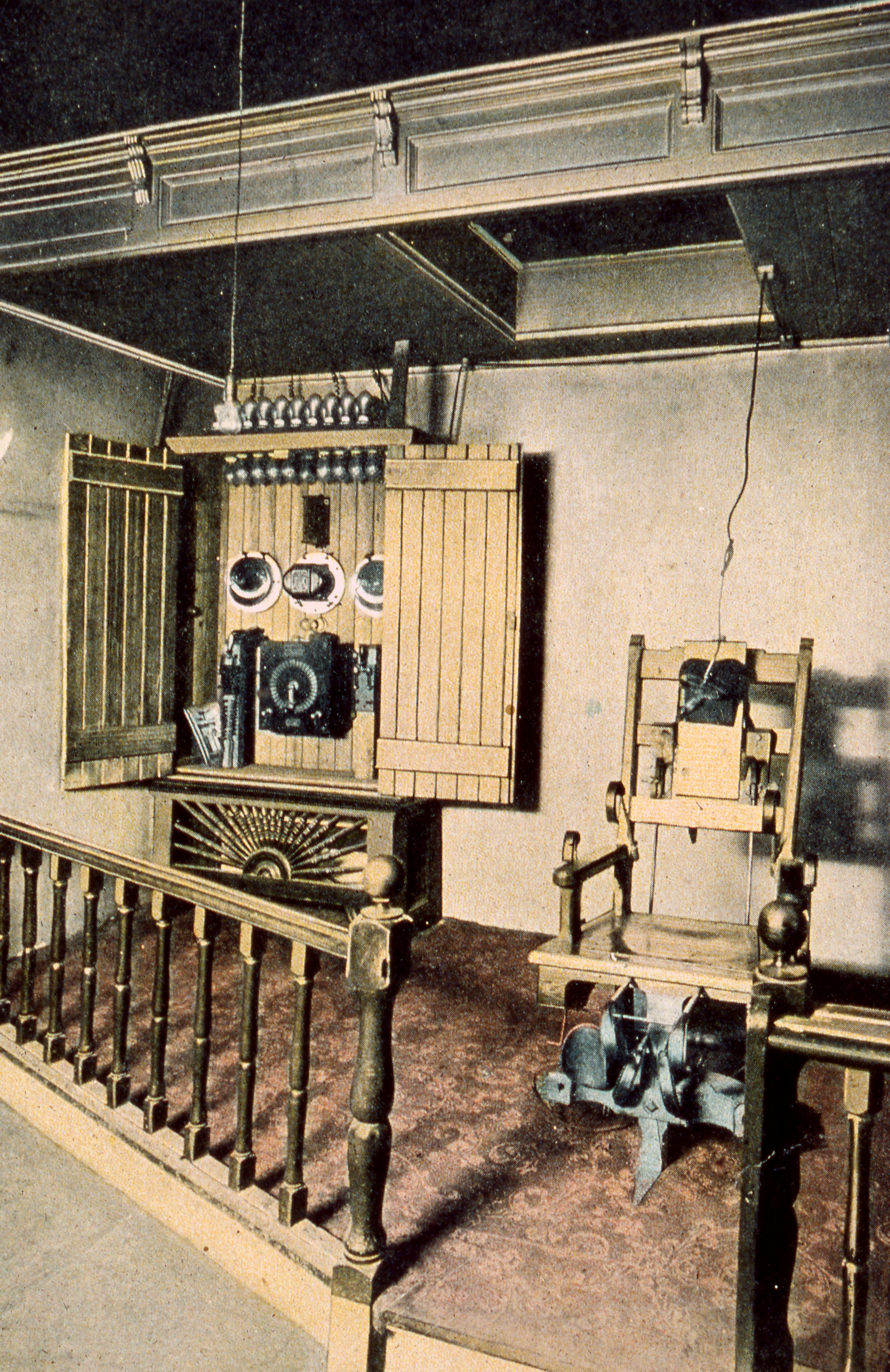
Ohio's first electric chair, otherwise known as "Old Sparky", alongside its console.

In 1897, the gallows were replaced by electrocution, which was considered to be a more technologically advanced and humane method of execution. After New York, Ohio also became the second state to use the electric chair. 28 hangings and 315 electrocutions were carried out at the now-defunct Ohio Penitentiary in Columbus from 1885 to 1963. On October 27, 1911, 43 years old Charles Justice was electrocuted for the murder of John Shoup, a farmer from Xenia who, on September 26, 1910, had caught Justice while he tried to steal from the Shoups' chicken house and was subsequently shot three times. Ironically, Justice had previously been an inmate of the Ohio Penitentiary and he had worked in the prison tin shop, where he built iron clamps to replace the leather straps that Ohio's electric chair was originally fitted with. He was therefore executed in the very same chair he had helped improve.

In 1913, the Death House was specifically curated to house the electric chair ("Old Sparky"), alongside other death row inmates. Under this invention and establishment, many botched executions still occurred using the new, fatal method.

The 31st inmate executed in Ohio since 1999, Marvallous Keene, was the 1000th person to be executed by lethal injection since its first use for executions by the U.S. in 1982.

On November 21, 2001, Ohio revised and amended the code of criminal prosecution by abolishing the use of electrocution as an authorized method of execution. This would leave lethal injection as the only remaining method of execution in the state. Similar statutory provisions to the death penalty were also taken by 10 other states at the time. As of December 31, 2001, Ohio, along with 36 states, utilized lethal injection as the predominant form of execution across the country.

On July 1, 2011, Lundbeck, the Danish pharmaceutical company that holds the sole licence to manufacture pentobarbital in the United States, announced that its distributors would deny distribution of pentobarbital to U.S. prisons that carry out the death penalty by lethal injection. The state's last dose of pentobarbital was used on September 25, 2013, to carry out the execution of Harry Mitts Jr., who was condemned for the murders of his white neighbor's African-American boyfriend, John Bryant and a white police officer, Sergeant Dennis Glivar. On January 16, 2014, Ohio executed Dennis McGuire at the Southern Correctional facility in Lucasville. McGuire was convicted of raping and then murdering 22-year-old Joy Stewart who was 30 weeks pregnant, becoming the first U.S. inmate to be executed with a combination of the drugs midazolam and hydromorphone. The effects of this combination of drugs on the body are controversial and not well understood. McGuire took 25 minutes to die, an unusually long time for an execution, being among the longest since Ohio resumed capital punishment in 1999.

In January 2015, the Ohio Department of Rehabilitation and Correction announced that all executions scheduled for the remainder of that year would be postponed due to the lack of availability of required drugs. In October 2015, the department further announced that Governor John Kasich had granted additional reprieves to all inmates due to be executed in 2016 for the same reason. Executions resumed in Ohio on July 26, 2017, when the state executed murderer Ronald Phillips.

The most recent execution in Ohio was in July 2018, when Robert J. Van Hook was executed via lethal injection for murder. The execution was carried out at the Southern Ohio Correctional Facility in unincorporated Scioto County, just outside the community of Lucasville. Since January 2024, death row for the majority of male inmates is located at the Ross Correctional Institution (RCI) in unincorporated Ross County, just outside of Chillicothe. A few high-security male death row inmates are held at the Ohio State Penitentiary (OSP) in Youngstown. Condemned female inmates are housed at the Ohio Reformatory for Women in Marysville and death row inmates with serious medical conditions are held at the Franklin Medical Center in Columbus. Before this, most male death row inmates were held at Chillicothe Correctional Institution, located near RCI.

On December 8, 2020, Governor Mike DeWine placed what he called an "unofficial moratorium" on capital punishment in the state, as a result of the impossibility to acquire drugs needed to carry out a lethal injection. DeWine indicated no executions would be carried out until the Ohio General Assembly approves another method, as lethal injection is the only currently approved method.

In January 2024, after Alabama authorized the execution of Kenneth Eugene Smith with nitrogen hypoxia, Ohio lawmakers were considering to legalize nitrogen gas as a new method of execution aside from lethal injection, and the new method was supported by the attorney general of Ohio.

As of April 6, 2026, Ohio has 108 inmates on death row. Notable inmates on Ohio's death row include serial killers Stanley Theodore Adams, Richard Beasley, Shawn Grate, Anthony Kirkland, and Michael Madison. There are no women on Ohio's death row following the commutation of Donna Roberts' sentence to life without parole on May 9, 2025. However, two male death row inmates, Timothy Hoffner (Taci Vixen) and Joel Drain (Victoria Drain), have transitioned while incarcerated.

The future of capital punishment in Ohio may be uncertain at the moment. On June 16, 2026, Governor Mike DeWine called for the Ohio legislature to abolish it, claiming that capital punishment is not an effective deterrent to violent crime. Several Ohio lawmakers and candidates reacted to DeWine's proposal to end the death penalty in Ohio.

== Methods ==
=== Hanging ===
124 people were executed by the state of Ohio via hanging before the state switched to the electric chair in 1897.

"That the mode of inflicting the punishment of death in all cases under this act, shall be by hanging by the neck, until the person so to be punished shall be dead; & the sheriff, or the coroner in the case of the death, inability or absence of the sheriff of the proper county, in which the sentence of death shall be pronounced by force of this act, shall be the executioner".

=== Electric chair ===
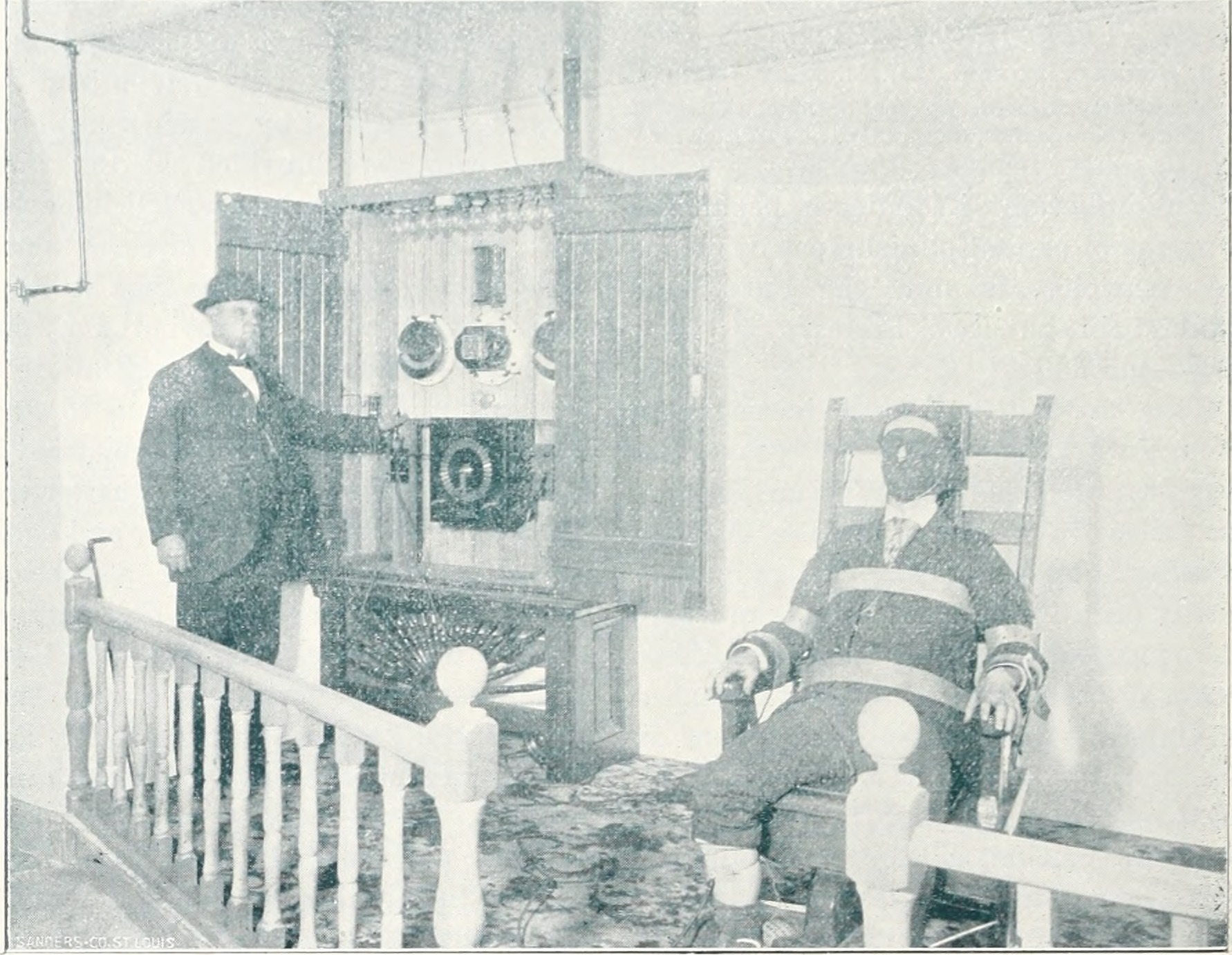
American_X-ray_journal_(1897)_(14756856855)

Ohio switched its method of execution from hanging to electrocution in 1897.

Thomas Edison, a resident of Akron, Ohio, as well as New York, New Jersey, and Michigan, directed his employees to develop the electric chair. Edison felt that the electric chair would be less cruel than hanging. However, on August 6, 1980, William Kemmler, a prisoner at Auburn Prison, was executed as his bones were set on fire during Edison's prison demonstration.

"[O]n the 10th day of March 1938, the said Warden shall cause a current of electricity of sufficient intensity to cause death to pass through the body of the said defendant, the application of such current to be continued until the said defendant is dead, and may God have mercy on your soul".

Ohio executed 175 people via electrocution until 1963 before it switched over to lethal injection in the 1990s.

=== Lethal injection ===
As of February 1999, Lethal injection became the current method of execution in Ohio.

Over the years, the state of Ohio has used several methods of lethal injection, culminating in the two-drug combination of midazolam and hydromorphone, frequently used in medical settings too.

The dose of midazolam starts at triple the dose used for sedation for office procedures, and the hydromorphone dose is a 150-to-500-fold overdose for parenteral analgesia in opioid-naïve patients.

== Legal process ==
When the prosecution seeks the death penalty, the sentence is decided by the jury and must be unanimous.

In the case of a hung jury during the penalty phase of the trial, a life sentence is issued, even if only a single juror opposed death (there is no retrial).

The power of executive clemency belongs to the governor of Ohio, after receiving a non-binding recommendation from the Ohio Parole Board. Despite opposing the death penalty, Michael DiSalle allowed six of the 12 cases he reviewed as governor to proceed, stating that he would have otherwise violated his oath of office.

=== Capital crimes ===
A charge of aggravated murder with death penalty specifications may occur with at least one of the following special circumstances:

1. The murder was the assassination of the president of the United States or person in the line of succession to the presidency, or of the governor or lieutenant governor of Ohio, or of the president-elect or vice president-elect of the United States, or of the governor-elect or lieutenant governor-elect of Ohio, or of a candidate for any of the foregoing offices.
2. The murder was committed for hire.
3. The murder was committed for the purpose of escaping detection, apprehension, trial, or punishment for another offense committed by the offender.
4. The murder was committed while the offender was under detention or while the offender was at large after having broken detention.
5. Prior to the murder, the offender was convicted of a previous offense having as an essential element the purposeful killing of or attempt to kill another, or the current offense was part of a course of conduct involving the offender's purposeful killing of or attempt to kill two or more persons.
6. The victim was a Law enforcement officer, and the offender knew or reasonably should have known that fact, and the officer was either performing duties or the offender acted with the specific purpose of killing such officer.
7. The murder was committed while the offender was committing, attempting to commit, or fleeing immediately after committing or attempting to commit kidnapping, rape, aggravated arson, aggravated robbery, or aggravated burglary, and either the offender was the principal offender in the commission of the aggravated murder or, if not the principal offender, committed the aggravated murder with prior planning.
8. The victim was a witness who was purposely killed by the offender either to prevent the victim from testifying, or in retaliation for prior testimony.
9. The offender, in the commission of the murder, purposefully caused the death of another who was under 13 years of age at the time of the commission of the offense, and either the offender was the principal offender in the commission of the offense or, if not the principal offender, committed the offense with prior planning.
10. The offense was committed while the offender was committing, attempting to commit, or fleeing immediately after committing or attempting to commit terrorism.

== Opposition and controversy ==
There is a movement in the state to end abolish capital punishment. According to the Associated Press, Republicans such as former Ohio Governor Bob Taft, great-grandson of President William Howard Taft, and former Ohio Attorney General Jim Petro have publicly opposed capital punishment. Taft questioned its effectiveness as well as geographic and racial disparities. The former Speaker of the House in Ohio, also Republican, Larry Householder, wants the legislature to revise the law due to the cost of executions and difficulty in obtaining drugs.

The BBC reported that The European Commission - the executive arm of the European Union - wished to ensure that no drugs were being exported from the Union for use in "capital punishment, torture or other cruel, inhuman or degrading treatment or punishment". The EU is part of a worldwide movement against the death penalty. Amnesty International's annual report found that in 2024, prisoners were executed in only 15 of the 193 UN member states.

Members of many religious faiths in Ohio have also officially opposed capital punishment.

=== Botched executions ===
The Los Angeles Times noted in October 2009 that Ohio had had three botched executions by lethal injection since 2006: Joseph Lewis Clark, Christopher Newton and Romell Broom. In November 2009, Ohio announced that it would only use a single drug for lethal injections, consisting of a single dose of sodium thiopental, the first state to do so. The first single drug execution was that of Kenneth Biros, 51, on December 8, 2009. Biros was convicted of murdering 22-year-old Tami Engstrom near Masury, Ohio in 1991. Biros' counsel indicated to the U.S. Court of Appeals for the Sixth Circuit that Biros' execution, given that it is the first of its kind, may amount to "human experimentation." Various appeals for clemency were ultimately denied. Ohio announced in January 2011 that it will change the drug used from sodium thiopental to pentobarbital, as the availability of sodium thiopental had become quite scarce. The first execution using pentobarbital, was that of Johnnie Baston, on March 10, 2011.

The Atlantic magazine wrote that on January 14, 2014, Dennis McGuire took over 11 minutes to die and was unable to breathe, during a lethal injection in Ohio's death chamber. "Over those 11 minutes or more he was fighting for breath, and I could see both of his fists were clenched the entire time," recounted Father Lawrence Hummer, an execution witness. "There is no question in my mind that Dennis McGuire suffered greatly over many minutes."

=== Failed executions ===
Ohio has failed twice in its efforts to execute an inmate by lethal injection. Romell Broom in September 2009 and Alva Campbell in November 2017 had their executions aborted due to the execution teams not being able to find a usable vein. Both later died on death row while awaiting new execution dates.

=== Notable exonerations ===
Ricky Jackson was exonerated in 2014 after serving 39 years for his conviction in the 1975 murder of Harold Franks in Cleveland. The conviction was almost solely based on the testimony of 12-year-old Eddie Vernon, who claimed that, while looking out of his school bus window, he saw 18-year-old Jackson shoot Franks and escape with brothers Ronnie and Wiley Bridgeman. Vernon eventually fully recanted his statement, admitting that he thought he had seen the incident, but that he had been pressured by police and told that his parents would be arrested if he did not testify. Jackson holds the record for the longest time served before exoneration in the United States.

Elwood Jones was exonerated in December 2025. Jones became the 12th person to be exonerated from the death penalty in Ohio. Jones was convicted of murder and robbery of an elderly woman, Rhoda Nathan, in 1996 and spent 29 years on death row until he was released due to withheld evidence and lack of evidence of guilt.

== See also ==
- Crime in Ohio
- Law of Ohio
- List of death row inmates in the United States § Ohio
- List of people executed in Ohio

== Bibliography ==
- Laws Passed in the Territory of the United States North-West of the River Ohio. Philadelphia, PA: Printed by F. Childs and J. Swaine, 1788.; microfiche Buffalo, NY: Hein, 1986.
- Davis, Harry: Death by Law. Columbus, OH: Federal Printing, 1922. (Reprinted from Outlook Magazine).
- DeBeck, William: Murder Will Out: The Murders and Executions of Cincinnati. Cincinnati, OH: 1867.
- DiSalle, Michael: The Power of Life or Death. New York, NY: Random House, 1965.
- Wanger, Eugene G.: "Capital Punishment in Ohio: A Brief History", Ohio Lawyer, November–December 2002, 8, 11, 30.
- Fogle, H. M.: The Palace of Death, or, The Ohio Penitentiary Annex. Columbus, OH: 1908.
- Fornshell, Marvin E.: The Historical and Illustrated Ohio Penitentiary Annex. Columbus, OH: Arthur, W. McGraw, 1997 (reprint of the 1903 original)
- Hixon, Mary, and Frances Hixon: The Last Hangings: Jackson, Ohio 1883-1884. Mary Hixon and Frances Hixon, 1989
- Maynard, Rosina: Ohio's Other Lottery System: The Death Penalty. Columbus, OH: Rosina Maynard, 1980.
- Morgan, Dan: Historical Lights and Shadows of the Ohio State Penitentiary. Columbus, OH: Ohio Penitentiary Printing, 1893.
- Welsh-Huggins, Andrew: No Winners Here Tonight: Race, Politics, and Geography in One of the Country's Busiest Death Penalty States. Columbus, OH: Ohio University Press, 2008
- Streib, Victor L.: The Fairer Death: Executing Women in Ohio. Columbus, OH: Ohio University Press, 2006
