= Chillicothe Correctional Institution =

American medium security prison

- Interactive map of Chillicothe Correctional Institution
- Location: Scioto Township, Ross County, near Chillicothe, Ohio; 39°22′16.79″N 83°0′24.60″W
- Status: Operational
- Security class: Minimum to medium
- Capacity: 2,950
- Opened: 1966
- Managed by: Ohio Department of Rehabilitation and Correction
- Director: Warden Gary Galloway

Chillicothe Correction Institution, or CCI, is a state-run medium security prison on the west bank of the Scioto River just outside Chillicothe, Ohio. It is located adjacent to Ross Correctional Institution and Hopewell Culture National Historical Park. The prison is a former military camp, named for Civil War general William Tecumseh Sherman. It later became a federal penitentiary and has housed several high-profile prisoners including Charles Manson in 1952, bootlegger and future NASCAR driver Junior Johnson, and serial killer Anthony Sowell.

Country music legend Johnny Paycheck also served a 22-month stint in CCI for shooting a man in a Hillsboro bar. During Paycheck's time there, his friend and fellow musician Merle Haggard performed for the inmates.

== Composition ==
The prison lies in Scioto Township.

== Death row relocation ==
On October 3, 2011, the Ohio Department of Rehabilitation and Corrections announced that the majority of Ohio's male death row would be relocated to CCI from the Ohio State Penitentiary (OSP) in Youngstown and Mansfield Correctional Institution in Mansfield, with some high security death row cells being maintained at OSP and inmates with medical issues being held at the Franklin Medical Center in Columbus. This was done to free up cells at OSP and Mansfield to be used to separate violent inmates from the general population as well as the increased security and reduced costs of transporting condemned inmates from CCI to both the execution chamber at the Southern Ohio Correctional Facility (SOCF) in Lucasville and to the Franklin Medical Center for medical treatment. The transfer of death row inmates was completed on January 19, 2012.

In January 2024, the Ohio Department of Rehabilitation and Correction announced it would be moving the main men's death row from Chillicothe Correctional Institution to Ross Correctional Institution.

== Notable inmates ==
=== Current ===
- Anthony Cook – Serial killer who along with his brother Nathaniel raped and murdered nine people between 1973 and 1981.
- Quisi Bryan – Convicted murderer who killed police officer Wayne Leon in 2000 and was sentenced to death.
- Shawn Grate – Serial killer with five known victims. Will be transferred to Lucasville when the execution date is set.
- Anthony Kirkland – Serial killer who strangled, raped and burned the bodies of four females. Will be transferred to Lucasville when the execution date is set.
- George Skatzes – One of the leaders of the Lucasville prison riot at the Southern Ohio Correctional Facility. Will be transferred back to Lucasville when the execution date is set.
- James D. Worley – Perpetrator of the murder of Sierah Joughin. Will be transferred to Lucasville when the execution date is set.
- David Lance Bruce – Sentenced to 33-years-to-life for the murder of Tawana Beane, Melonie Carr, and Robin Brown.
- William Sapp – Sentenced to death for the murders and rape of three girls in Springfield, Ohio.
- Eugene Blake - Serial killer who murdered two people in Ohio and West Virginia from 1982 to 1984, shortly after being paroled from a life term for the 1967 murder of a young woman
- Michael Shane Shuster – Former mayor of Stockport, Ohio who was convicted of multiple counts of statutory rape of a minor.

=== Former ===
- Romell Broom – Murderer who kidnapped, raped and strangled a teenage girl. He survived an execution attempt in 2009. Died in 2020.
- Richard Finch – He served a 7-year sentence for having sexual contact with multiple teens.
- Charles Manson – Leader of the Manson Family.
- Johnny Paycheck – Country music singer.
- Anthony Sowell – Serial killer who committed 11 murders between 2007 and 2009. Died in 2021.
- Michael Madison – Serial killer who raped and strangled three women. Will be transferred to Lucasville when the execution date is set.
- Gregory McKnight – Serial killer who murdered two people in 2000.
- Austin Myers – Perpetrator of the murder of Justin Back. Will be transferred to Lucasville when the execution date is set.
- Danny Lee Hill – convicted of raping and murdering a 12-year-old boy in 1985. Sentenced to death, and currently scheduled to be executed on July 22, 2026.
