= Murder of Christopher Hammer =

1993 murder and kidnapping of a man in Lucas County, Ohio

- Location: Lucas County, Ohio, United States
- Date: September 22, 1993
- Attack type: Murder; Robbery; Kidnapping
- Victim: Christopher Hammer
- Verdict: Guilty
- Convictions: Hoffner and Dixon; Aggravated murder Kidnapping; Aggravated robbery Forgery (3 counts); Wilkerson; Kidnapping
- Sentence: Hoffner and Dixon; Death; Wilkerson; Six to 25 years' imprisonment
- Convicted: Timothy Hoffner; Archie Dixon; Kirsten Wilkerson

On September 22, 1993, in Lucas County, Ohio, 22-year-old Christopher A. Hammer (1971 – September 22, 1993) was robbed and beaten by his former roommate Archie James Dixon (born May 30, 1973) and a second man named Timothy Lee Hoffner (born June 6, 1972), who both took him to a remote wooded area and buried him alive in a shallow grave. The two men also stole Hammer's car in order to sell it and even made use of Hammer's birth certificate and social security card to receive state identification papers to facilitate the sale of Hammer's car, and they were subsequently arrested and charged with murdering Hammer.

The two men were found guilty of multiple counts of aggravated murder, kidnapping, robbery and forgery, and sentenced to death after separate trials. Dixon's girlfriend, Kirsten Wilkerson, who helped drive the killers and victim to the shallow grave, was sentenced to six to 25 years in prison for kidnapping. Both Dixon and Hoffner are currently scheduled to be executed a month apart of each other in June and July 2027 respectively.

== Murder ==
On the early morning of September 22, 1993, 21-year-old Timothy Lee Hoffner and 20-year-old Archie James Dixon, who both planned to kill the latter's 22-year-old former roommate Christopher Hammer in order to steal his car, took him to the house of Dixon's girlfriend Kirsten Wilkerson in Toledo, Ohio. At the residence itself, both Dixon and Hoffner sprung upon Hammer and assaulted him, with Dixon inflicting the blows on Hammer, who was restrained by Hoffner with a headlock. After the beatings, the men tied Hammer to a bunk-bed ladder and stole his money, birth certificate, and Social Security card.

Afterwards, the men left the house to dig a shallow grave in Lucas County, Ohio, and they returned to the house to bring Hammer, who was tied up and blindfolded, to the grave, with Wilkerson driving the men and Hammer to the area. Wilkerson stayed in the car while both Hoffner and Dixon took Hammer to the woods, where they allowed him to smoke a cigarette, before they placed him inside the grave. Despite Hammer's attempt to get out and calls for help, the men persisted and fully buried Hammer in the grave. According to the medical examiner who performed an autopsy on Hammer's remains, discovered two months after his death, Hammer likely died within five minutes of being buried alive and may have remained conscious for the first two to three minutes.

After murdering Hammer, the two men used the victim's social security card and birth certificate and applied for a identity card bearing Hammer's name and Dixon's photograph, which was issued three days later. With this identification, Dixon fraudulently sold off Hammer's car for $2,800. Two months later, on November 8, 1993, while investigating the disappearance of Hammer, the police uncovered the sale of Hammer's car and traced its location to a Toledo used car lot.

As a result of this breakthrough, Dixon was linked to the disappearance of Hammer, and he was arrested on a charge of forgery. Initially, Dixon admitted to only falsifying identification documents but denied any involvement in the victim's disappearance. However, after the body of Hammer was discovered, the murder was brought to light and Dixon confessed to the crime, and both Hoffner and Wilkerson were also implicated in the murder and arrested thereafter.

== Main perpetrators ==
=== Timothy Hoffner ===
Timothy Hoffner

Timothy Lee Hoffner, born Timothy Cade on June 6, 1972, was abandoned by his biological mother, Karen Kay Mueller Dillinger, shortly after birth. In 1973, he was adopted by Sally and Paul Hoffner, relatives who gave him their surname. His childhood was troubled by behavioral problems, mood swings, frequent conflicts with his half-brother, and persistent rocking behavior. He also suffered from disabling headaches and was subjected to corporal punishment by his adoptive parents, which his brother later described as excessive and abusive.

Hoffner reportedly displayed cruelty toward animals during childhood, including incidents involving the deaths of cats. His family maintained an unusually restrictive, survivalist lifestyle, with loaded firearms, extensive security measures, and limited opportunities for social interaction. Following his adoptive father’s death from cancer in 1987, Hoffner’s behavioral difficulties reportedly worsened, and he allegedly attempted suicide. Despite psychological counseling, his problems persisted. During adolescence, he began abusing alcohol and later marijuana. He eventually obtained his GED while incarcerated for Hammer’s murder. Psychological evaluations later identified antisocial and schizotypal personality disorders, as well as major depression, which experts partly attributed to his troubled upbringing and dysfunctional family environment.

Prior to the murder of Christopher Hammer, Hoffner was convicted of delinquency in connection with petty theft in June 1992. Two months later, in August 1992, Hoffner was convicted of failure to keep peace.

=== Archie Dixon ===
Archie Dixon

Archie James Dixon was born on May 30, 1973, in Lucas County, Ohio. Dixon was raised in a dysfunctional family environment marked by widespread alcoholism and physical abuse. His parents, uncle, paternal grandfather, and both maternal grandparents struggled with alcohol abuse. According to records, Dixon’s father was arrested between seven and ten times for driving under the influence and was subsequently required to undergo alcohol treatment programs. Dixon and his brother were frequently subjected to physical abuse by their parents, particularly their father, whose violence intensified when he was intoxicated. On multiple occasions, Dixon was kicked or beaten with a baseball bat.

These traumatic childhood experiences were followed by significant struggles with alcohol abuse, polysubstance abuse, anxiety, and depression later in his life, and Dixon was only 13 when he began to abuse drugs. Additionally, there were also instances of sexual abuse and incest in the family; Dixon's younger sister was being molested by their maternal grandfather as a child, and there were evidence of possible incest between Dixon's father and sister, as well as amongst the three Dixon siblings.

Dixon had a lengthy history of run-ins with the law as both a juvenile and adult offender, and culminated convictions for varied offences like delinquency in connection with assault, drug trafficking, gross sexual imposition, unruly behaviour and robbery. He was first convicted in 1987 and sent to a juvenile facility for two years. Six months after his 1989 release, Dixon was again held in another juvenile facility until March 1990. A month later, Dixon was found guilty of robbery, petty theft and possessing a concealed weapon, and sent to the Training Institution of Central Ohio, where he was confined until March 1991. After reaching adulthood, Dixon was convicted of failure to keep the peace, trespassing and shoplifting.

== Charges and pre-trial developments ==
On November 10, 1993, two months after the murder of Christopher Hammer, both Archie Dixon and Timothy Hoffner were charged with aggravated murder. Kirsten Wilkerson was not yet charged for her involvement, although the authorities contended she helped drive the two men to where they killed and buried the victim. A grand jury was expected to make their decision on November 16, 1993.

On November 16, 1993, a Lucas County grand jury indicted the trio for multiple charges pertaining to Hammer's death. The men were each indicted for three counts each of aggravated murder and forgery, and one count each of kidnapping and robbery, while Wilkerson was indicted for two counts of aggravated murder and one count each of robbery and kidnapping. If found guilty of the most serious charges of aggravated murder, the men potentially faced the death penalty. Wilkerson faced a potential sentence of 20 years to life since her charges were non-capital. Both Hoffner and Dixon officially pleaded not guilty to the charges a day after their indictment.

In January 1994, the judge, prosecution and defence agreed to consider an arrangement for both male defendants to stand trial before two separate juries in a simultaneous setting.

In August 1994, Judge William Skow of the Lucas County Common Pleas Court allowed Dixon's appeal to toss out his confession after accepting that the police never read out his Miranda Rights. The prosecution appealed against this decision, and in March 1995, the 6th District Court of Appeals overturned the ruling of Judge Skow, stating that Dixon's rights were not violated when his confession was obtained, and therefore allowed the confession to be re-admitted as evidence. In July 1995, the Ohio Supreme Court upheld the lower court's ruling and dismissed Dixon's appeal. His lawyers revealed their plan to bring the case further to the U.S. Supreme Court.

In October 1994, Wilkerson's murder trial was postponed to January 30, 1995. Later that same month, the trials of both Hoffner and Dixon were similarly postponed until January 30, 1995.

On January 4, 1995, Judge Skow dismissed Hoffner's motion to suppress the evidence of his bloodstained tennis shoes in his upcoming trial.

In February 1995, a judge ordered the DNA testing of the tennis shoes and blood samples from the two men to determine whether the blood belonged to either one of the men, or the victim.

On June 6, 1995, the trial of Dixon was postponed until October 16, 1995.

In July 1995, Dixon was charged with witness intimidation after he allegedly sent death threats to Wilkerson, threatening to kill her and her children and family if she ever came to court to testify against him.

In August 1995, Judge William Skow, the trial judge assigned to the cases of both Hoffner and Dixon, voluntarily decided to withdraw himself from the trial of Dixon, explaining that he was too deeply involved in the case for two years and had been exposed to the evidence too much, and it therefore affected his ability to approach the case impartially. A new judge was set to preside over the trial of Dixon, although Judge Skow remained as the trial judge for the case of the female co-defendant Kirsten Wilkerson.

== Trials ==
=== Trial of Timothy Hoffner ===
Before his trial started, through his lawyers, Timothy Hoffner offered to plead guilty and testify against his co-defendant Archie Dixon if the death penalty was taken off the table, and the defence proposed a life sentence that would keep Hoffner in prison for at least 40 years until he became eligible for parole. However, the prosecution refused to accept the offer.

On May 15, 1995, a 12-member jury was selected to hear Hoffner's trial, which was set to begin two days later on May 17, 1995. The prosecution sought the death penalty against Hoffner for the most serious charges of aggravated murder. During the trial, Dixon's girlfriend Kirsten Wilkerson testified against Hoffner and recounted the details of Christopher Hammer's death to the court.

On May 19, 1995, Hoffner was found guilty of all six counts of aggravated murder, kidnapping, aggravated robbery and forgery.

On May 24, 1995, the jury unanimously recommended the death penalty for Hoffner.

On June 1, 1995, Hoffner was formally sentenced to death by Judge William Skow. Hoffner also received prison terms of ten to 25 years each for kidnapping and robbery, plus one year for each of the three forgery counts.

=== Trial of Archie Dixon ===
On October 30, 1995, Archie Dixon officially stood trial for the murder of Hammer, and jury selection happened on the same day. Like in the trial of Hoffner, Dixon's girlfriend Kirsten Wilkerson showed up in court as the prosecution's key witness to testify. The prosecution contended during the proceedings that Dixon was the mastermind who "directed, planned, and organized the crime".

On November 7, 1995, after eight hours of deliberation, the jury found Dixon guilty of all eight counts of forgery, kidnapping, aggravated robbery and aggravated murder. The jury reconvened the next day to deliberate on the sentence, and the defence argued against the death penalty and sought life imprisonment instead.

On November 9, 1995, the jury swiftly returned with their decision after seven minutes of deliberation, voting to impose the death penalty for Dixon.

On November 22, 1995, Judge James Jensen formally sentenced Dixon to death, plus ten to 25 years each for kidnapping and robbery, and 1 1/2 years for each of the three forgery counts. An execution date of March 22, 1996, was scheduled for Dixon, but it would be stayed while Dixon's case was automatically appealed to the higher courts.

=== Trial of Kirsten Wilkerson ===
Kirsten Wilkerson was the final member of the trio to be tried for the murder of Hammer. She was originally offered to plead guilty to only the charge of kidnapping in exchange for her testimony against the two men. Despite the fact that she testified against Dixon and Hoffner in their trials, Wilkerson ultimately chose to not accept the plea deal on November 16, 1995, and as a result, she would be put on trial for the original charges of abducting, robbing and murdering Hammer.

Eventually, Wilkerson was scheduled to go on trial on February 12, 1996, for the killing. Unlike her male co-defendants, Wilkerson would not face the death penalty because the prosecution did not seek it. Before her trial begain, Wilkerson filed a motion seeking to use the defence of duress, in which she argued that she was acting out of fear that Hoffner and Dixon would do something to her if she did not follow their instructions. On February 8, 1996, the prosecution successfully persuaded the judge to reject the motion, and the judge ruled that the defence was ought to not stand because when the men left her alone with the victim, she did not take the opportunity to either self-help or escape, and she was already aware by then that their plan was to kill Hammer.

On February 12, 1996, the first day of her trial, Wilkerson admitted to one count of kidnapping under an "Alford plea", a form of guilty plea that allowed a defendant to proclaim innocence but accepted the conviction and sentence. In exchange for her plea, the other charges of aggravated murder and robbery were dismissed.

On March 25, 1996, Wilkerson was sentenced to six to 25 years in prison by Judge William Skow. During sentencing, Judge Skow stated that it was "morally deficient" for Wilkerson to not save Hammer when she could have intervened, but he conceded that she did not share the same level of culpability as both Hoffner and Dixon. Wilkerson would become eligible to receive shock probation after completing a minimum of six months into her sentence.

For the following two years, Wilkerson served her sentence at the Ohio Reformatory for Women in Marysville, Ohio, and on May 21, 1998, Wilkerson was granted shock probation by Judge Skow, and in accordance with her order, Wilkerson was to serve probation for the next five years, and she was required to find employment, receive regular drug tests and bear the costs of her trial.

== Appeals of Dixon and Hoffner ==
=== Hoffner ===
On March 23, 2001, the 6th District Court of Appeals of Ohio rejected Timothy Hoffner's appeal against his death sentence and murder conviction.

In April 2004, Hoffner petitioned to the Ohio Supreme Court for a re-trial. Three months later, in July 2004, the Ohio Supreme Court denied Hoffner's re-trial application.

On February 14, 2007, the Ohio Supreme Court dismissed Hoffner's appeal to reopen his case.

On April 18, 2011, Hoffner's final petition for a writ of certiorari was denied by the U.S. Supreme Court.

=== Dixon ===
In October 2003, Archie Dixon filed an appeal to the Ohio Supreme Court, stating that his conviction was not valid since his confession was obtained improperly after the police withheld the Miranda rights. In April 2004, the Ohio Supreme Court upheld Dixon's death sentence and rejected his appeal.

On September 9, 2010, by a 2–1 majority ruling, the 6th Circuit Court of Appeals overturned the conviction and sentence of Dixon, and ordered that he should receive a re-trial for the murder of Hammer within the next six months. The court found that the police intentionally did not advise Dixon of his rights to remain silent and speak to an attorney when they questioned him over the forgery charge before they probed him for the murder of Hammer, as they believed he would invoke his right to counsel if they informed him of the Miranda rights.

On November 7, 2011, the U.S. Supreme Court allowed the prosecution's appeal and reinstated Dixon's death sentence and murder conviction, after they found that the police did not violate his Miranda rights when they conducted the first interview and obtained Dixon's confession.

On September 10, 2013, the 6th Circuit Court of Appeals dismissed Dixon's appeal and affirmed his conviction and sentence.

On October 6, 2014, Dixon's final petition for a writ of certiorari was denied by the U.S. Supreme Court.

== Death row and scheduled executions ==
While on death row, Timothy Hoffner transitioned into a female, and began using the name Taci Vixen. As of 2026, Hoffner, alongside Joel Drain, who uses the name Victoria Drain, was one of two transgender women incarcerated on Ohio's death row. However, the Ohio Department of Rehabilitation and Correction continued to list Hoffner as a male named Timothy Hoffner.

On June 8, 2015, the Ohio Supreme Court signed the death warrants of five death row inmates, including Archie Dixon and Timothy Hoffner, whose executions were scheduled on March 20, 2019, and May 29, 2019, respectively. As of October 2016, Hoffner and Dixon were among 26 condemned inmates in Ohio who received execution dates between 2017 and 2019.

On August 31, 2016, Hoffner appealed to the Ohio Supreme Court to delay his execution, in light of a recent ruling by the Marion County Common Pleas Court to overturn another inmate's death sentence, which determined that Ohio's 1981 capital punishment law was unconstitutional due to the jury weighing the factors to decide between death or life in prison while the judge independently evaluated the factors before making the final call on sentence. On October 27, 2016, the Ohio Supreme Court denied Hoffner's plea to delay his execution.

As of April 2018, the execution dates of Dixon and Hoffner were delayed until June 23, 2021, and August 11, 2021, respectively.

On December 18, 2020, Governor Mike DeWine granted a temporary reprieve for three inmates, including Dixon, whose execution date was reset for April 17, 2024.

On April 8, 2021, Hoffner's execution date was delayed until June 18, 2024, after Governor DeWine granted him a three-year reprieve as well.

On October 13, 2023, Dixon's execution date was delayed for another three years until June 16, 2027.

On February 16, 2024, Hoffner received another stay of execution and his date was delayed until July 14, 2027.

In September 2025, the family of Christopher Hammer publicly appealed to the governor and sought acknowledgement and updates regarding the scheduled executions of the pair, whom they hoped that the governor may either order their executions or commute their sentences to life in prison, as they hoped to get closure after more than three decades of waiting for a resolution.

As of 2026, both Hoffner and Dixon remains incarcerated on death row at the Ross Correctional Institution. The duo were previously held at the Chillicothe Correctional Institution, where a majority of Ohio's death row was formerly located before the state decided to relocate the death row to Ross Correctional Institution from 2024 onwards.

== See also ==
- Capital punishment in Ohio
- List of death row inmates in the United States § Ohio
- List of people scheduled to be executed in the United States
