= Madison Correctional Institution =

Madison Correctional Institution may refer to:

- Madison Correctional Institution (Florida), a state prison for men in Madison, Madison County, Florida
- Madison Correctional Institution (Ohio), a state prison for men located in London, Madison County, Ohio
