= Stanley Theodore Adams =

American convicted serial killer (born 1966)

Stanley Adams
- Mugshot of Adams
- Born: Stanley Theodore Adams; August 23, 1966 (age 60); Ohio, U.S.
- Status: Incarcerated
- Convictions: Murder; Rape (x3); Aggravated murder (x2); Kidnapping; Aggravated burglary
- Penalty: 2000; 25 years to life imprisonment (Taylor); 2001; Death (the Cooks)

Details
- Victims: 3
- Date: August – November 1999
- Location: Ohio
- Imprisoned at: Ross Correctional Institution

Stanley Theodore Adams (born August 23, 1966) is an American serial killer convicted of three murders in Ohio. In August 1999, Adams raped and murdered 40-year-old Roslyn Taylor in Hubbard, Ohio, and her body was discovered two days later inside a partially burnt car. Three months later, in November 1999, Adams killed a mother-daughter pair, 43-year-old Esther Cook and 12-year-old Ashley Cook, in Warren, Ohio. Adams was also a suspect behind several unsolved killings.

Adams was arrested and charged for these murders, and after two trials, Adams was sentenced to 25 years to life in prison for Taylor's murder while he was sentenced to death for the murders of Esther and Ashley Cook and his execution date is set for February 16, 2028.

== Murders ==
=== Roslyn Taylor ===
On the early morning of August 5, 1999, after returning from a party the night before, 40-year-old Roslyn Taylor first encountered Stanley Adams, who first arrived at the house of her ex-husband, whom she had recently divorced. At their first meeting, Adams and Taylor became intimate and the latter told her friend that she found Adams "cute" and wanted to have sex with him on her ex-husband's bed. When Taylor's ex-husband returned home half an hour later, he quarreled with his ex-wife before he left, and both Adams and Taylor left the house about 15 minutes later. That was the last time Taylor was seen alive.

A day later, on August 6, 1999, Taylor's corpse was found inside a burnt car in Hubbard, Ohio. Taylor's body was found seated on the car's passenger side, and the car was severely damaged by the fire and smoke, and it originated from behind the driver's seat.

Dr. Humphrey D. Germaniuk, the forensic pathologist who performed an autopsy on the victim, found that Taylor suffered from multiple wounds to her head and body, defensive wounds on the back of her hands, and she also had a blackened left eye, and a fractured hyoid bone. Germaniuk also stated that there were signs of strangulation, but confirmed that the cause of death was due to fatal carbon monoxide poisoning. He also found a high alcohol level in the blood of the victim.

Based on the evidence, the prosecution contended was after she left her ex-husband's house, Taylor had been beaten, raped and strangled by Adams, who left her body inside the car and set fire to cover up the murder. At the time of his arrest and trial for Taylor's murder, further forensic tests matched the traces of sperms in a rectal smear of Taylor's body to Adams.

=== Ashley and Esther Cook ===
On October 11, 1999, Adams would kill a mother-daughter pair in Warren, Ohio.

Before the double murder, Adams and his girlfriend had previously stayed together with the latter's half-sister, 43-year-old Esther Cook, and her 12-year-old daughter, Ashley Cook, before he moved out in March 1999. On the evening of October 11, 1999, Adams went to a drug party at his friend's apartment, but he left the party at about 11 pm to get more money.

After he left the party, Adams went to the house of both Esther and Ashley Cook, where he murdered both of them. Esther was killed as a result of a relentless assault and stabbing that left multiple wounds on her, while Ashley was raped and strangled to death inside her bedroom by Adams. He left the house after stealing a roll of money, and when he returned to the party at about 1 am, Adams was noted to have blood all over his clothes and the roll of cash.

An hour later, Adams was stopped by the police while driving, and the police saw that he was shirtless and had blood on his pants. Adams told the police that he cut his hand. Afterwards, Adams was released and never taken into custody. The bodies of both Ashley and Esther were found at noon the following day after the murders.

Autopsy results showed that Esther died of "multiple blunt force traumatic injuries and multiple sharp force traumatic injuries", and four of these stab wounds were inflicted on the neck and head. Ashley was found with an electrical cord tied around her neck, and the pathologist certified that the cause of Ashley's death was "strangulation associated with blunt force trauma to the head". There were also bruises around the vaginal area of Ashley, brain swelling, and lacerations to her mouth. The forensic experts also conducted rectal, vaginal, and oral swabs on Ashley's body, and the test results for semen returned positive.

=== Suspected murders ===
Aside from the murders of the Cooks and Taylor, Adams was also named a suspect in several other murders.

Adams was named a suspect behind the unsolved death of 37-year-old Robin Morrow, whose body was found in a ditch in Warren on November 19, 1998, and she was only wearing one sock and a sweater, which was pulled over her head when the body was discovered. Morrow's death was classified as a homicide by the police. The cause of death was later certified to be drug overdose by the coroner's office, but the police continued to proceed with a murder investigation as the report suggested that Morrow would have survived with timely medical attention.

In another Ohio case, Adams was suspected to have killed 37-year-old Justine Lorraine Catrucco. Her body was found near the railroad tracks on September 13, 1999, and she was reportedly wearing only her shirt, with her pants and shoes found ten feet away from her body. An autopsy report revealed that Catrucco died as a result of strangulation. At the time of her death, Catrucco left behind three sons, her father, two brothers and one sister.

Apart from the murders in Ohio, Adams was also considered a possible suspect behind two unsolved murders in Pennsylvania, which shared similarities with the confirmed killings of Taylor and the Cooks, but the police did not specify the type of similarities found in these cases. Joyce Ann Heskett-Washington, a sex worker, was found murdered in Mahoning Township on August 12, 1999, while Danita Jo Landres was found murdered in a field near Linesville on May 27, 1999.

== First murder trial ==
On October 20, 1999, Stanley Adams was arrested for unrelated charges of receiving stolen property, firearms and being a felon in possession of a firearm. He was sentenced to 18 months in prison for these charges and served the sentence at Lorain Correctional Institution. During the investigations, Adams's involvement in the murders of Roslyn Taylor and both Esther and Ashley Cook were gradually brought to light, and as a result, in March 2000, Adams was first indicted by a grand jury for one count of aggravated murder in the death of Taylor.

Adams was first put on trial in October 2000 for the rape and murder of Taylor. During the trial itself, the court received an autopsy report from the county coroner's office, which revealed that the cause of death was carbon monoxide poisoning. The defence also argued that Adams was innocent in this case, claiming that the victim agreed to have sex with Adams when they were together on the day of her murder. A third charge of arson was also dismissed in Adam's case after the judge found insufficient evidence to proceed with this charge.

On November 8, 2000, the jury found Adams guilty of the rape and aggravated murder of Taylor. Adams faced a potential sentence of death, life without parole or life with the possibility of parole after 25 years or 30 years.

After Adams's conviction, the defence filed a request for a new trial and to reduce Adams's aggravated murder conviction to a lesser conviction of murder. Judge John Stuard granted the defence's motion, and lowered the conviction from aggravated murder to murder, allowing Adams to avoid the death penalty for murdering Taylor. Afterwards, Adams was sentenced to 25 years to life imprisonment for murder, and an additional ten years for the other charge of rape.

== Second murder trial ==
After Stanley Adams was sentenced to life for Taylor's rape and murder, a second grand jury formally indicted him for two counts of aggravated murder in the deaths of Ashley and Esther Cook on November 16, 2000. Like in the case of Taylor, Adams similarly denied that he was involved in the murders of the Cooks.

On November 27, 2000, Adams appealed for his trial to be moved out from Trumbull County to a different county, and asked for a different judge, stating that he might not receive a fair trial in Trumbull County due to the pre-trial publicity surrounding the case. In December 2000, two lawyers were assigned to defend Adams in his upcoming trial for the double murder.

On September 5, 2001, the second murder trial of Adams began in a local trial court in Warren County, and jury selection began on the first day of trial. The jury was assembled on September 11, 2001, and opening statements were made the next day.

During the trial, the defence argued that Adams was innocent of the double murder, and attempted to impeach the credibility of some of the trial witnesses, who were self-confessed prostitutes and drug addicts. However, the prosecution argued that there were crucial evidence pointing to the guilt of the defendant, including the DNA tests that matched the sperm found on the body and bedsheet of Ashley to Adams's DNA, and Adams being seen wearing a pair of bloodstained shorts by a police detective during a routine traffic stop. The prosecution also noted that Adams testified to coming back from a party only to discover the bodies, and yet he did not call the police about the discovery, and the forensic pathologist also testified that the victims were being hit by a type of tool.

On September 25, 2001, the jury found Adams guilty of both counts of aggravated murder for the deaths of the Cooks. The jury was scheduled to return to court on October 2, 2001, to decide between the death penalty or imprisonment for life with or without parole.

On October 3, 2001, the jury unanimously recommended two death sentences for the most serious charges of aggravated murder.

On October 9, 2001, Judge Peter Kontos formally sentenced Adams to death for both counts of murdering Esther and Ashley Cook, and ordered an execution date of October 11, 2002, although the execution itself would be stayed while pending a mandatory appellate review by the higher courts. Adams reportedly expressed his intention to appeal against the sentence.

After he was condemned to death row, Adams was admitted to the Chillicothe Correctional Institution.

== Appeals ==
On June 30, 2004, the Ohio Court of Appeals rejected Stanley Adams's appeal against his conviction and life sentence for the murder of Roslyn Taylor.

In August 2004, Adams appealed against his death sentence at the Ohio Supreme Court.

On November 17, 2004, the Ohio Supreme Court dismissed Adams's direct appeal against the death sentence for the murder of the Cooks.

On January 28, 2005, the Ohio Court of Appeals rejected Adams's post-conviction appeal against the death penalty.

On July 19, 2016, Adams lost his appeal to the 6th Circuit Court of Appeals.

== Scheduled execution ==
On January 25, 2017, Trumbull County Prosecutor Dennis Watkins filed a motion to the Ohio Supreme Court, seeking to schedule an execution date for Stanley Adams, who had exhausted all avenues of appeal at this point in time.

On April 21, 2017, the Ohio Supreme Court signed a death warrant for Adams, scheduling him to be executed three years later on April 16, 2020. Subsequently, in April 2018, Adams's execution date was rescheduled on February 16, 2022.

On September 10, 2021, Governor Mike DeWine postponed the execution dates of Adams and three other inmates, and Adams's death sentence was rescheduled to be carried out on February 19, 2025. At that time, an unofficial moratorium was imposed on all pending executions in Ohio since December 2020 due to the state's inability to procure the drugs required for lethal injection (the state's only method of execution), and DeWine also stated that lethal injection was no longer an option for capital punishment in Ohio, and the state must replace it with a different execution method in order to resume executions. Prior to the moratorium, Robert Van Hook was the last person executed in Ohio on July 18, 2018.

In March 2024, Trumbull County Prosecutor Dennis Watkins submitted an appeal to the Ohio Attorney-General's Office, asking for the state to resume executions and carry out the death sentence of Adams, citing that he was among the worst of the worst sexual predators and serial killers on Ohio's death row and he deserved to be executed sooner, and justice should be served for the families of his victims.

On October 18, 2024, DeWine issued another stay of execution for Adams and another two inmates, pushing the trio's execution dates back to 2028. The tentative execution date of Adams was reset as February 16, 2028.

In February 2025, Watkins penned two letters to both the U.S. Attorney General Pam Bondi and Ohio Attorney General Dave Yost, urging the both of them to ensure the restoration of capital punishment in Ohio and resumption of executions in the state. Adams was one of the cases cited among the report of Watkins's appeal.

As of 2026, Adams remains incarcerated on death row at the Ross Correctional Institution.

== See also ==
- Capital punishment in Ohio
- List of serial killers in the United States
- List of death row inmates in the United States § Ohio
- List of people scheduled to be executed in the United States
