= Murder of Damico Watkins =

1996 murder of an African-American prisoner in Ohio

Damico Watkins
- 1996 mugshot of Damico Watkins
- Born: Damico D. Watkins; July 20, 1978; Ohio, U.S.
- Died: April 25, 1996 (aged 17); Madison Correctional Institution, Ohio, U.S.
- Cause of death: Homicide by stabbing
- Status: Murdered in prison
- Conviction: Aggravated robbery
- Penalty: Five to 25 years' imprisonment

Details
- Victims: 1
- Date: 1994
- Location: Ohio
- Imprisoned at: Madison Correctional Institution (Ohio)

On April 25, 1996, at the Madison Correctional Institution in Ohio, 17-year-old Damico Watkins (July 20, 1978 – April 25, 1996), an African-American inmate and juvenile offender, was attacked and murdered by a group of six white prisoners who were part of the prison's Aryan Brotherhood gang. The motive behind the attack was due to their displeasure with sharing the same prison as the African-American prisoners, coupled with their wish to be transferred to other prisons. Five of the inmates were convicted and given life sentences for the murder, while the ringleader of the attack, John Stojetz (born February 13, 1956), was found guilty of aggravated murder and sentenced to death, and he is currently scheduled to be executed on May 19, 2027.

== Attack and murder ==
On April 25, 1996, at the Madison Correctional Institution in Ohio, 17-year-old Damico Watkins, an African-American juvenile offender, was fatally attacked by six members of a white supremacist gang. At the time of his death, Watkins had been serving five to 25 years' imprisonment since 1994 for acting as a lookout during a failed robbery at a pizza shop. Although he was underage at the time of the offense, Watkins was tried and convicted as an adult. He had been transferred to the Madison Correctional Institution in January 1996 — just three months before he was killed.

That day, six members of the Aryan Brotherhood gang, who were each armed with knives, ran across the prison yard and entered the Adams Alpha Unit, which housed most of the facility's juvenile inmates who had been tried as adults. Based on investigations, the gang was displeased with sharing the same prison and cells as the African-American prisoners, and thus decided to conduct the attack in order to earn themselves a transfer to other prisons. The gang reached the control desk, where the gang leader, 40-year-old John C. Stojetz, held the corrections officer Michael Browning hostage by pointing the weapon to his neck, forcing Browning to hand over the keys before letting him go. Upon Browning's release, the prison authorities were alerted to the attack.

After gaining entry into the unit, Stojetz and his five cohorts went to Cell 144, where Watkins was confined, and attacked him. Watkins was able to elude the attack and escape his cell, and the gang chased after Watkins, who kept running throughout the unit. During the pursuit, Watkins was repeatedly attacked, cornered, and stabbed by his six attackers only to escape again each time. Watkins was cornered by the gang for the final time on the second floor. Despite pleading with his assailants for mercy, Watkins was stabbed and killed by both Stojetz and 39-year-old Jerry W. Bishop.

During the attack on Watkins, the unit was surrounded by correction officers, and Deputy Warden Mark Saunders began to converse with the inmates, who were ordered to surrender themselves. During the stand-off, the gang declared that they had killed Watkins, whom they addressed with a racial slur, and they stated they took care of what the officers had not done. Ultimately, the gang gave themselves up and handed over their weapons. The incident itself lasted for about 15 minutes.

=== Participants ===
- John C. Stojetz, 40, serving 13 to 30 years' imprisonment for aggravated robbery, forgery, weapon under disability and drug abuse.
- Jerry Bishop, 39, serving 15.5 to 70 years' imprisonment for burglary, aggravated burglary and aggravated assault.
- James Bowling, 30, serving 15 to 70 years' imprisonment for aggravated burglary.
- David Ray Lovejoy, 53, serving life imprisonment for aggravated murder.
- William Vandersommen, 30, serving ten to 50 years' imprisonment for both aggravated robbery and burglary.
- Phillip Wierzgac (also spelt Phillip Weirzack), 20, serving ten to 25 years' imprisonment for attempted murder.

== Murder trials ==
=== Trials of Stojetz and Bishop ===
John Stojetz

Of the suspects, John Stojetz and Jerry Bishop were the first to be charged with the murder of Damico Watkins. On October 17, 1996, a Madison County grand jury formally indicted Stojetz and Bishop for one count of aggravated murder. Tentative trial dates were also scheduled for the pair, with Stojetz standing trial first on March 10, 1997, and Bishop on May 12, 1997.

Stotejz was the first to stand trial in April 1997. During the trial, 18-year-old Andre Wright, a fellow prisoner of Watkins, testified that he tried to help Watkins and told him to jump over the railing through an open door at the other end of the dorm, before the gang members caught up with him. When the defense alleged that Watkins was part of the prison gang Folks Nation during cross-examination, Wright denied that Watkins was a gang member while in prison; Deputy Warden Mark Saunders similarly testified that Watkins was never identified as a member of any prison gangs.

On April 8, 1997, Stojetz was found guilty of aggravated murder by the jury, the first of the six defendants to be convicted of Watkins's murder. Nine days later, on April 17, 1997, Stojetz was sentenced to death by Madison County Common Pleas Judge Robert Nichols upon the jury's unanimous recommendation for capital punishment.

On July 14, 1997, Bishop was the second of the men to be tried for the aggravated murder of Watkins at the Madison County Court of Common Pleas. In the end, Bishop was convicted of a lesser offence of murder and sentenced to 15 years to life in prison on July 23, 1997.

=== Trials of Lovejoy, Bowling, Wierzgac and Vandersommen ===
On July 4, 1997, the remaining four members – David Lovejoy, James Bowling, Phillip Wierzgac and William Vandersommen – were formally indicted for aggravated murder. Three of these – Lovejoy, Vandersommen and Wierzgac – each pleaded guilty to the murder of Watkins. Vandersommen was sentenced to 20 years to life in prison, while Wierzgac's exact sentence was not specified (presumed to be life). Bowling was put on trial on August 10, 1998, for aggravated murder. He was found guilty on August 21, 1998, and sentenced to 30 years to life ten days later. On January 12, 1999, Lovejoy was sentenced to 20 years to life.

== Appeals ==
=== Stojetz ===
- On February 17, 1999, John Stojetz's appeal was denied by the Ohio Supreme Court.
- On December 2, 2002, the Ohio Court of Appeals rejected Stojetz's appeal.
- On June 7, 2010, Stojetz's post-conviction appeal was dismissed by the Ohio Court of Appeals.
- On June 5, 2018, the 6th Circuit Court of Appeals dismissed Stojetz's appeal, ruling that his claims of ineffective counsel and prosecutorial misconduct were without merit.

=== Bishop and Bowling ===
- On October 5, 1998, the Ohio Court of Appeals dismissed the appeal of Jerry Bishop against his conviction and sentence.
- On November 22, 1999, the Ohio Court of Appeals rejected an appeal from James Bowling against his conviction and life sentence.

== Scheduled execution of Stojetz ==
On March 25, 2019, Madison County Prosecutor Stephen Pronai filed a motion to seek an execution date for John Stojetz, who had exhausted all his avenues of appeal against the death sentence. In response, Stojetz's lawyers argued that it served no meaningful purpose to schedule Stojetz's execution when there was a pause on capital punishment while the state was seeking a new lethal injection method to carry out all pending death sentences.

On May 24, 2019, the Ohio Supreme Court signed a death warrant for Stojetz, scheduling him to be executed on March 14, 2024.

On October 13, 2023, Governor Mike DeWine granted a three-year execution reprieve for three inmates facing execution, including Stojetz, whose execution date was rescheduled for May 19, 2027. At that time, there was an informal moratorium on capital punishment in Ohio since December 2020 due to the state's inability to procure the drugs required for lethal injection (the state's only method of execution). DeWine also stated that a different method should be legalized to replace lethal injection, which he declared to be no longer an option. Since the pause on executions in the state, Robert Van Hook remains the last person executed in Ohio on July 18, 2018.

As of 2026, John Stojetz remains incarcerated at the Ross Correctional Institution. Stojetz was previously held at the Chillicothe Correctional Institution, where a majority of Ohio's death row was formerly located before the state decided to relocate the death row to Ross Correctional Institution.

== Current status of Stojetz's accomplices ==
As of 2018, Lovejoy and Wierzgac were no longer under the custody of the Ohio Department of Rehabilitation and Correction. Wierzgac was no longer listed as an inmate in Ohio state custody. Official prison records showed that Lovejoy and Bishop had since died in prison on unknown dates.

As of 2026, Bowling remains incarcerated at the Pickaway Correctional Institution. His first parole hearing is scheduled to begin in July 2028, and his earliest possible release date was listed as August 22, 2028. Vandersommen is still imprisoned at the Grafton Correctional Institution, and his next parole hearing date is tentatively in August 2031, with his earliest projected release date being October 1, 2031.

== Aftermath ==
The murder of Damico Watkins was regarded as one of the most infamous crimes to happen in Ohio.

In May 1996, Watkins's mother filed a US$100 million wrongful death lawsuit, claiming that the authorities did not put in adequate efforts to ensure the safety of her son and avoid his death.

The murder of Watkins also brought attention to the United States' nationwide move to toughen laws against juveniles and the increasing rates of prosecution of juveniles as adults for certain offences. Watkins's death brought public concerns that trying juveniles as adults and their confinement in adult prisons may pose a threat to the safety of youth prisoners in such facilities, in addition to the existing concern that juvenile offenders may receive less support (including psychological counseling or job training programs) in these environments.

== See also ==
- Capital punishment in Ohio
- List of death row inmates in the United States § Ohio
- List of people scheduled to be executed in the United States
