= 2002 Lima, Ohio, apartment shooting =

2002 double murder in Lima, Ohio

- Location: Lima, Ohio, United States
- Date: January 3, 2002
- Attack type: Murder by shooting Robbery
- Weapon: Gun
- Deaths: 2
- Injuries: 6
- Verdict: Guilty
- Convictions: Jackson; Aggravated murder Attempted aggravated murder Aggravated robbery Cunningham; Aggravated murder Attempted aggravated murder Aggravated robbery
- Sentence: Jackson; Death (August 5, 2002); Cunningham; Death (June 26, 2002)
- Convicted: Jeronique Cunningham; Cleveland Jackson

On January 3, 2002, in Lima, Ohio, United States, a pair of brothers, Jeronique Dwayne Cunningham (born August 13, 1972) and Cleveland Ramon Jackson (born June 26, 1978), committed a robbery at a home in order to steal money and drugs. During the robbery itself, both Cunningham and Jackson rounded up the eight people present at the house, and shot all of them.

Of all the eight occupants in the house, 17-year-old Leneshia Williams and three-year-old Jayla Grant died of fatal gunshot wounds while the remaining six were wounded but survived. Jackson and Cunningham were both arrested, tried and convicted of aggravated murder, and sentenced to death. As of 2026, the brothers still remain on death row, and Jackson's death sentence is scheduled to be carried out on June 13, 2029.

== Murders ==
On January 3, 2002, 23-year-old Cleveland Ramon Jackson Jr. and 29-year-old Jeronique D. Cunningham, who were half-brothers, planned to commit robbery at the home of a 28-year-old drug dealer named LaShane Liles. That evening, the brothers armed themselves with guns and went to Liles's apartment in Lima, Ohio. At that time, Liles was not at home, but seven relatives and friends of his were inside the apartment. Liles himself later returned to the apartment, and engaged in a discussion about a drug transaction with Jackson, while Cunningham stayed at the living room and watched the television with three of the occupants: 18-year-old Coron Liles, 15-year-old Dwight D. Goodlowe and 17-year-old Leneshia Williams.

After some time, Cunningham made his move. Brandishing his gun, he ordered Coron, Goodlowe and Williams into the kitchen, and struck Coron in the jaw with his gun barrel when the boy did not immediately comply with his orders. Jackson also whipped out his gun and held Liles at gunpoint, forcing him to hand over money and drugs. The remaining four occupants, three-year-old Jayla Grant and her 27-year-old father James Grant, Liles' 24-year-old fiancée Tomeaka J. Grant, and 26-year-old Armetta Robinson were also ordered into the kitchen.

After he gave Jackson the money and drugs, Liles was herded into the kitchen like the other seven victims, and the brothers demanded he give them more cash, but Liles insisted he already gave them all he had. As a result, Liles was shot in the back by Jackson. Subsequently, both Cunningham and Jackson fired more shots at the other seven people, including three-year-old Jayla Grant, who was shot in spite of the others' pleas to have her life spared. After the shooting, the two men departed from the residence, leaving behind the eight victims. In spite of his wounds, Liles was able to contact the police regarding the shooting.

Of the eight victims, Grant and Williams were killed in the shooting. The other six — including Grant’s father — were hospitalized and survived after receiving medical care; Tomeaka and Robinson were taken to the St. Rita's Medical Center while the rest were taken to Lima Memorial Hospital. Among them, Robinson remained in a coma for several weeks due to a gunshot wound to the head. Tomeaka lost her left eye after being shot in the head and also suffered a gunshot wound to her arm. James sustained five gunshot wounds affecting his head, arm, and hand. Goodlowe suffered a fractured rib when a bullet grazed his chest. Coron was shot in the face, resulting in the loss of some teeth and injuries to his mouth.

According to the deputy coroner, Williams died from a single gunshot wound to the back of her head. Grant, meanwhile, sustained two gunshot wounds to the head—one above her right ear and another behind it—both of which penetrated her skull and proved fatal.

== Trials of Cunningham and Jackson ==
=== Charges ===
On January 6, 2002, three days after the shooting, the brothers' whereabouts were traced to a motel in Dayton after Lima Police traced them using cell phone data and after the police surrounded the motel, both Jeronique Cunningham and Cleveland Jackson surrendered themselves to the police and were thus arrested for the murders.

After their arrests, on January 8, 2002, both Jackson and Cunningham were first charged with felonious assault for the shooting of one of the surviving victims.

On January 11, 2002, a special Allen County grand jury formally indicted both Jackson and Cunningham for two counts of aggravated murder with firearm and death-penalty specifications, one count of aggravated robbery with a firearm specification, and six counts of attempted aggravated murder with a firearm specification. Additionally, Cunningham's charges also carried repeat violent offender specifications, which could lead to an additional ten-year prison term if found guilty.

=== Cunningham ===
Jeronique Cunningham

On June 10, 2002, Cunningham became the first of the two brothers to stand trial before the Allen County Common Pleas Court, and jury selection began on the same day. Opening statements were made on June 14, 2002, after a jury was convened to hear the case.

On June 19, 2002, the jury found Cunningham guilty of all nine criminal charges: one count of aggravated robbery, six counts of attempted aggravated murder, and two counts of aggravated murder.

On June 21, 2002, the jury unanimously recommended two death sentences for both the murders of Grant and Williams.

On June 26, 2002, Allen County Common Pleas Judge Richard Warren formally sentenced Cunningham to death for the double murder, setting a tentative execution date of January 3, 2003 for the defendant, although the execution would be stayed while pending a mandatory appellate review by the state higher courts.

=== Jackson ===
Cleveland Jackson

On July 16, 2002, Jackson was officially put on trial for the murders of Grant and Williams, and jury selection commenced that same day.

On July 23, 2002, the opening day of Jackson's trial, Jackson's defence counsel argued that their client only fired a single shot at one of the six surviving victims with his 380-caliber semi-automatic pistol, but never fired any further shots at the rest of the victims, and pinpointed Cunningham as the person who fired most of the shots at all the eight victims and hence killed both Grant and Williams. However, at one point during his trial, Grant's father (one of the six survivors in the shooting) testified that he tried to shield his daughter from the shots, and described that the shorter of the two killers, who was identified as Jackson, turned to Cunningham and nodded his head before the both of them began to continuously shoot the victims.

On July 26, 2002, the jury found Jackson guilty of two counts of aggravated murder, one count of aggravated robbery, and six counts of attempted aggravated murder.

On July 30, 2002, the jury recommended the death penalty for Jackson on both counts of aggravated murder.

On August 5, 2002, Jackson was formally sentenced to death for murdering Williams and Grant. During sentencing, Allen County Common Pleas Judge Jeffrey Reed remarked that the heinous actions of Jackson placed him "in that narrow class of murderers who deserve society's ultimate punishment."

== Appeals ==
=== Cunningham's appeals ===
On October 26, 2004, Jeronique Cunningham appealed to the Ohio Supreme Court to overturn his conviction and grant him a re-trial.

On December 30, 2004, the Ohio Supreme Court upheld Cunningham's death sentences and dismissed his appeals.

On June 25, 2014, the 6th Circuit Court of Appeals allowed Cunningham's appeal and permitted him to request for a new trial.

On May 22, 2015, Cunningham appeared at the Allen County Common Pleas Court and filed a motion seeking a new trial.

On September 10, 2015, Cunningham's application for a new trial was rejected by Allen County Common Pleas Court Judge David Cheney.

On August 24, 2020, the 6th Circuit Court of Appeals rejected Cunningham's application for an expanded certificate of appealability (COA).

On January 13, 2022, the 6th Circuit Court of Appeals ordered a new hearing into Cunningham's claims of alleged juror bias.

On April 16, 2022, Cunningham filed a new appeal, seeking to have his death sentence commuted to life without parole on the basis that he suffered from a serious mental illness at the time of the murders.

On November 14, 2022, by a majority vote, the Supreme Court of the United States upheld the ruling of the 6th Circuit Court of Appeals to review the juror bias allegations raised by Cunningham. Justice Clarence Thomas, one of the three dissenting judges, criticized the ruling and stated that the lower court had violated the Supreme Court's precedents in "continually granting relief to death row prisoners".

=== Jackson's appeals ===
On October 4, 2004, Cleveland Jackson's appeal was denied by the Ohio Court of Appeals.

On March 30, 2005, Jackson filed a direct appeal to the Ohio Supreme Court, and his lawyers argued that Jackson was denied a fair trial.

On November 23, 2005, after hearing Jackson's appeal, the Ohio Supreme Court overturned one of Jackson's death sentences for the murder of Grant, but at the same time, they unanimously affirmed Jackson's other death sentence for the murder of Williams. Subsequently, Jackson was re-sentenced to life imprisonment for Grant's murder, although he remained on death row for Williams's murder.

On July 24, 2012, Jackson's appeal against his remaining death sentence was rejected by the 6th Circuit Court of Appeals.

On August 10, 2020, Jackson's post-conviction petition was turned down by the Ohio Court of Appeals.

== Scheduled execution of Jackson ==
On August 13, 2013, the Ohio Supreme Court signed a death warrant for Cleveland Jackson, scheduling his execution to take place on November 17, 2015.

Subsequently, in October 2015, Jackson's execution date was postponed and changed to September 13, 2018. By October 2016, Jackson was one of 26 death row inmates whose executions were scheduled in Ohio between January 2017 and October 2019.

On July 20, 2018, Governor John Kasich granted a temporary stay of execution for Jackson and reset a new execution date of May 29, 2019, while at the same time, Governor Kasich commuted the death sentence of Raymond Tibbetts to life without parole; Tibbetts was originally set to be executed on October 17, 2018, before he was granted clemency upon the state parole board's recommendation.

On March 7, 2019, Jackson and two other inmates were each granted a six-month reprieve by Governor Mike DeWine (who succeeded Kasich as governor), and Jackson's execution date was postponed from May 29 until November 13, 2019.

On September 30, 2019, Jackson's execution date was postponed to two years later on January 13, 2021, in light of a disciplinary misconduct complaint he filed against his lawyers for alleged negligence in handling his case.

On September 4, 2020, the date of Jackson's execution was re-scheduled on June 15, 2023, after Governor DeWine granted a three-year execution reprieve for Jackson and another two inmates facing execution in early 2021.

On November 10, 2022, Governor DeWine granted a three-year stay of execution for three inmates, including Jackson, whose execution date was postponed to July 15, 2026.

On January 30, 2026, Governor DeWine issued another stay of execution for Jackson, Danny Lee Hill and Gerald Hand, and their execution dates were pushed back to 2029. Jackson's execution date was reset as June 13, 2029.

== Aftermath ==
As of 2026, both Cleveland Jackson and Jeronique Cunningham remain incarcerated on death row at the Ross Correctional Institution.

The 2002 Lima apartment shooting was regarded as one of the most notorious crimes to happen in Ohio.

In March 2004, two years after the shooting, one of the six surviving victims, LaShane Liles, was arrested and charged with cocaine trafficking, and sentenced to 16 years in prison.

== See also ==
- Capital punishment in Ohio
- List of death row inmates in the United States § Ohio
- List of people scheduled to be executed in the United States
- List of mass shootings in the United States
