= Eugene Blake =

Eugene Blake may refer to:

- Eugene Carson Blake (1906–1985), American Presbyterian Church leader
- Eugene Blake (serial killer) (born 1945), American serial killer
