= Anthony Sowell =

American serial killer (1959–2021)

- Sowell in the wanted flyer issued by the Cuyahoga County Sheriff's Office, October 2009
- Born: Anthony Edward Sowell; August 19, 1959; East Cleveland, Ohio, U.S.
- Died: February 8, 2021 (aged 61); Franklin Medical Center, Columbus, Ohio, U.S.
- Status: Deceased
- Convictions: Aggravated murder (11 counts); Attempted murder (4 counts); Kidnapping (2 counts); Rape (5 counts); Attempted rape (5 counts); Abuse of a corpse (11 counts); Tampering with evidence (11 counts)
- Penalty: Death

Details
- Victims: 11
- Span of crimes: May 2007 – September 2009
- Country: United States
- State: Ohio
- Date apprehended: October 31, 2009

Anthony Edward Sowell (August 19, 1959 – February 8, 2021) was an American serial killer and rapist known as The Cleveland Strangler. He was convicted in 2011 of murdering 11 women whose bodies were discovered at his Cleveland, Ohio, home in 2009. After being sentenced to death for the murders, Sowell died in prison from a terminal illness.

== Early life ==
Anthony Edward Sowell was born and raised in East Cleveland, Ohio, one of seven children born to single parent Claudia "Gertrude" Garrison. Seven other children belonging to Sowell's sister also lived in the household, having moved in after her death following a chronic illness. Sowell had an extremely abusive and traumatic upbringing due largely to Garrison; according to Sowell's niece, Leona Davis, Garrison subjected them to physical abuse while her own children watched from adjacent rooms. In one incident, Garrison forced Davis to strip naked in front of the other children, then whipped her with electrical cords until she bled. Sowell himself began raping his niece on an almost daily basis for two years, starting when she was 10. It was reported by Davis that the other males in the household also committed the rapes.

== Military service ==
On January 24, 1978, at the age of 18, Sowell entered the United States Marine Corps. He attended recruit training at Marine Corps Recruit Depot Parris Island in South Carolina, then was further trained as an electrician at Camp Lejeune in North Carolina. On July 13, 1978, he was assigned to the 2nd Marine Aircraft Wing at Marine Corps Air Station Cherry Point, also in North Carolina. In 1980, he spent a year overseas in Japan with the 3rd Force Service Support Group, then returned to Cherry Point.

Sowell was ordered to Marine Corps Base Camp Butler in Okinawa Prefecture, Japan on January 20, 1984. A year later, he transferred to Camp Pendleton in California for three days until his discharge on January 18, 1985. During his seven-year Marine Corps career, he received a Good Conduct Medal with one service star, a Sea Service Deployment Ribbon, a Certificate of Commendation, a Meritorious Mast, and two Letters of Appreciation.

== 1989 attack, incarceration, and release ==
In 1989, a woman who was three months pregnant attempted to leave Sowell's home. He bound her hands and feet with a tie and belt, then gagged her with a rag. She told police: "He choked me real hard because my body started tingling. I thought I was going to die." In 1990 he was charged with kidnapping, rape and attempted rape. He pled guilty to attempted rape, and served 15 years in prison. He was released in 2005.

Sowell worked in a factory until 2007 when he began collecting unemployment benefits. Neighbors said he earned a living selling scrap metal. They complained to the health department of a foul smell in the neighborhood. He was a member of an online dating service, where he said he was a "master" looking for a submissive person to train.

Lori Frazier, a niece of Cleveland Mayor Frank G. Jackson, began a relationship with Sowell shortly after his release from prison and resided in his home. She said she smelled decaying bodies and was told the smell was coming from Sowell's stepmother, who lived downstairs, or from Ray's Sausage Shop, located next door. A friend said Frazier stopped spending time at the home in 2008.

== Discovery of bodies and arrest ==
In September 2009, Sowell invited Latundra Billups to his home to smoke crack cocaine. On September 22, she told police that after a few drinks, he became angry and hit, choked, and raped her as she passed out. On October 29, police arrived at his home with an arrest warrant. He was not there, but he was located and arrested two days later.

During a search of the home, the bodies of two women were found buried in a shallow grave in the basement and four other women were found on the third floor of the home, and in crawlspaces. After digging in the backyard, investigators found three more bodies and partial remains of a fourth. A human skull in a bucket inside the house brought the body count to 11. Most of the victims were killed by manual strangulation and others were gagged or had ligatures on their bodies when they were discovered.

Sowell also raped three other women, luring them to his property with an invitation to smoke crack with him.

At the time of his arrest, Sowell was 50 years old. He had been living at that location for four years. He was held on $5 million bond. His trial was originally supposed to start on June 2, 2010, but was repeatedly delayed: first to September 7 to give his attorneys more time to prepare, then to February 14, 2011, then to May 2 at the request of his attorneys who needed more time to examine thousands of records and hours of surveillance video footage shot from the property next door to Sowell's, and later to June 6 at the request of the prosecution due to scheduling conflicts. The trial began on June 6, 2011.

== Conviction, sentencing, appeals, and death ==
Sowell was charged with 11 counts of aggravated murder and 74 counts of rape, kidnapping, tampering with evidence, and abuse of a corpse. He pled not guilty by reason of insanity but later changed his plea to simply "not guilty." On July 22, 2011, he was convicted on all but two counts, including the murders of the eleven women whose bodies were found in his house in 2009. On August 10, jurors recommended the death penalty. On August 12, Judge Dick Ambrose upheld the jury's recommendation. On September 14, he was placed on death row and imprisoned at Chillicothe Correctional Institution.

That November, Sowell's lawyers, Jeffry F. Kelleher and Thomas Rein, filed a Notice of Appeal with the Supreme Court of Ohio. Sowell's execution was set for October 29, 2012, but that March, a Motion for Stay of Execution was filed; the motion was granted in April, pending final disposition of the appeal. In October, his new lawyers, Jeffrey M. Gamso and Erika Cunliffe of the Cuyahoga County Public Defender's office, appealed to have his conviction and death sentence overturned on 21 points, with the main three being:

- that he did not receive a fair trial because of the extensive media coverage. The "media attention was overwhelming, generating thousands of news stories, and…local coverage was 'both frenzied and sustained.'"
- that the courtroom had been closed to the public "during an evidentiary hearing and while a jury was picked."
- and that he had received "lousy legal representation." "Sowell's trial attorneys should have had their client plead guilty to killing the women and then focus their efforts on preventing Sowell from getting the death penalty."

In September 2014, the court asked both parties to address three issues.

On April 5, 2016, the Ohio Supreme Court heard arguments from Sowell's appellant attorneys and the Cuyahoga County assistant Prosecutor representing the State of Ohio regarding the merits of the closed pre-trial Suppression Hearing prior to trial, and the defendant's right to a fair and public trial. His lawyers argued that his Sixth Amendment right was violated by closing the Suppression Hearing to the press, and that the Court should commute his death sentence to life imprisonment as a remedy to the structural error that resulted in the violation. They also argued that counsel had made errors, and "urged the Ohio Supreme Court to send the case back to Cuyahoga County for a retrial. 'Frankly we blew it,' attorney Jeffrey Gamso told the Ohio Supreme Court."

The State argued that if Sowell's Sixth Amendment right was violated via the closed pre-trial suppression hearing, it would not have affected the outcome of the trial, as the evidence was overwhelming, and that "Sowell's attorneys were the ones who asked multiple times in his presence for the jury selection to be done privately, without cameras in the courtroom." The State also asserted that Sowell has never denied his guilt, and that the heinous nature of his crimes—coupled with little mitigating evidence to deny imposing the death penalty—warrants affirming the death sentence.

On December 8, 2016, the Ohio Supreme Court rejected an appeal from Sowell, affirming his aggravated murder convictions and death sentence. In May 2017, he appealed to the U.S. Supreme Court. In October, it chose to not hear him. In February 2018, the Ohio Supreme Court denied his request to reopen his appeal. In May 2020, the State of Ohio's 8th District Appellate court denied his appeal.

On February 8, 2021, Anthony Sowell died at an Ohio prison hospital of an unspecified terminal illness.

== Victims ==
On November 5, 2009, two of the eleven victims were identified. All of Sowell's known victims were African-American women of an either slender or morbidly obese build, 10 of the 11 women were mothers. Of these victims, seven of them were between the age of 44 to 53, three in their 30's and the third was 25. The first two were in their 30s.

Kim Yvette Smith, a 44-year-old, was the first victim tied to Sowell to be reported missing in 2009. She was reported missing by her family. Her body was discovered in Sowell's backyard.

Leshanda Long, 25, went missing in August 2008; she was the youngest of Sowell's victims. Her skull was found wrapped inside a bucket in Sowell's basement.

Tonia Carmichael, 53, had disappeared more than a year earlier. Her body was found buried in his backyard. She appeared to have been strangled and was identified through the use of DNA evidence. Her mother had reported her missing in December 2008.

Telacia Fortson, 31, had disappeared five months earlier. Although she had been missing since June, her mother did not report her missing until she heard the news coverage regarding the dead bodies discovered in Sowell's home.

On November 8, 2009, three more bodies were identified. Crystal Dozier was a 38-year-old who went missing in May 2007. The mother of seven children, she lived in the area where her body was discovered. Her family reported her missing to the Cleveland Division of Police. This was not the first time she had gone missing, and the family accused the police of failing to investigate. The family took it upon themselves to post fliers and call hospitals.

Amelda "Amy" Hunter, 47, was a beautician and mother of three. Amy did not live in the area where her body was found, but did visit frequently. Her family did not report her missing until after police began removing bodies from Sowell's house.

Michelle Mason, 45, was last seen in October 2008. She lived in the area where her body was found. According to records, the police conducted a full investigation when her family reported her missing.

Records of missing people going back to Sowell's June 2005 release from prison were searched and DNA testing was conducted on the bodies found at Sowell's house. Protesters holding posters of missing loved ones gathered outside his home at the time.

East Cleveland police also reopened several cold cases from the late 1980s. The murders by strangulation used a similar modus operandi and had stopped around 1989, the same time that Sowell was arrested. The FBI at the time was gathering information to see if Sowell may have been linked to unsolved cases in cities where he once lived.

=== List ===
Victim	Name	Age	Disappearance
1	Crystal Dozier	38	May 17, 2007
2	Tishana Culver	31	June 2008
3	Leshanda Long	25	August 2008
4	Michelle Mason	45	October 8, 2008
5	Tonia Carmichael	53	November 10, 2008
6	Kim Yvette Smith	44	January 17, 2009
7	Amelda Hunter	47	April 2009
8	Nancy Cobbs	45	April 24, 2009
9	Telacia Fortson	33	June 3, 2009
10	Janice Webb	48	June 2009
11	Diane Turner	48	Late September 2009

== Aftermath ==
After Sowell's conviction, in December 2011, his former residence on 12205 Imperial Avenue was demolished by order of the city's leaders. He was incarcerated in the Chillicothe Correctional Institution. On January 21, 2021, Sowell was transferred to The Franklin Medical Center in Columbus, so he could begin to receive end-of-life care for an unspecified terminal illness. Sowell remained in The Franklin Medical Center until his death on February 8, 2021.

The case was profiled on the series premiere of the Investigation Discovery show Killer Instinct.

Unseen, a documentary film about the victims and survivors of Sowell's crimes, was produced and released in 2016 by Laura Paglin.

In November 2012, Sowell released a letter through the website Serial Killers Ink. The letter was to the people of Cleveland. He railed against former trial judge and newly elected Cuyahoga County prosecutor Tim McGinty and addressed the issue of artwork which he had recently sent to the owner of the website.

On July 16, 2021, ground was broken for the Garden of 11 Angels memorial on the former Sowell property; it was dedicated November 6, 2021.

On July 24, 2021, five women who survived kidnappings by Sowell told their stories on Oxygen's Snapped episode "Notorious The Cleveland Strangler".

== See also ==
- List of serial killers in the United States
- List of serial killers by number of victims
