= Shawn Grate =

American serial killer on death row

- Ashland County Sheriff's Office mugshot
- Born: Shawn Michael Grate; August 8, 1976 (age 50); Marion, Ohio, U.S.
- Spouse: Amber Nicole Bowman (m. 2011; div. 2012)
- Children: 3
- Status: Incarcerated
- Convictions: Aggravated murder (three counts); Murder; Kidnapping (four counts); Rape (four counts); Abuse of a corpse (four counts); Aggravated robbery (two counts); Burglary (four counts); Breaking and entering; Tampering with evidence; Unauthorized use of a vehicle
- Penalty: Death

Details
- Victims: 5+
- Span of crimes: 2006 – September 13, 2016
- Country: United States
- State: Ohio
- Locations: Ashland County, Marion County, Richland County
- Date apprehended: September 13, 2016
- Imprisoned at: Ross Correctional Institution

Shawn Michael Grate (born August 8, 1976) is an American serial killer and rapist who was sentenced to death for the murders of five young women in and around northern Ohio from 2006 to 2016. Grate was convicted on two counts of aggravated murder on May 7, 2018, in Ashland County, pleaded guilty to two additional murders on March 1, 2019, in Richland County, and pleaded guilty to an additional murder on September 11, 2019, in Marion County.

Grate was sentenced to death and is on death row awaiting execution.

== Early life ==
Shawn Michael Grate was born in Marion, Ohio, on August 8, 1976. He was said to have lived a normal early life, playing softball and football in his backyard and socializing with neighborhood children.

In school, Grate was said to have had many problems and was held back for kindergarten and the first grade of his education. Despite these problems, he was said to be very charming and amicable, with a former female friend of his stating that "all the girls liked Shawn." His parents divorced on August 6, 1982, two days before his 6th birthday.

When Grate was 11, his mother abandoned the family in Ohio to live with a man in Kentucky. Grate was upset with this affair and did not like Theresa's boyfriends, continuing to live with his father for the next four years. Living with his father, he attended River Valley High School, where he excelled as a baseball player but never played again after breaking his arm, which required surgery following the discovery of a tumor. Harboring murderous fantasies toward his mother from a young age, his half-sister would state that "it was a battle in the household, and that was apparent at a young age between the two of them."

According to a high school girlfriend, Grate would lie on the couch "for days" at a time before returning to normal. A court psychiatrist described Grate as "kind of a depressed kid" despite his reputation as a happy youth, stating that his condition hailed from "neglect and emotional detachment" faced in childhood. Custody of Grate and his brother was transferred to their father on June 28, 1994. Grate was arrested for grabbing his girlfriend's throat on November 24, 1994. After graduating from River Valley High School in 1995, he broke into a house in Marion County with a juvenile accomplice on October 23, 1996, to steal jewelry and money. Grate was given a felony burglary charge in January 1997 and sentenced to four years in prison before being released early in October 1997.

== Trials ==
A grand jury indicted Grate on two counts of aggravated murder in the deaths of two women, Stacey Stanley and Elizabeth Griffith, and the kidnapping and multiple sexual assaults of an unidentified woman whose 911 call to Ashland police led to Grate's arrest on September 13, 2016. In court documents, her name was redacted and she was referred to as "Jane Doe." Grate was indicted on 23 counts, all first, second, or third-degree felonies; lesser charges include breaking and entering, burglary, and tampering with evidence.

Grate was represented in court by court-appointed attorney Rolf Whitney, who entered a plea of not guilty on all charges on his behalf. In a press interview Grate confessed to five murders. Grate's attorneys later filed a plea of not guilty by reason of insanity. His trial date was set for November 6, 2017, and was later delayed to April 9, 2018.

Ashland County prosecutor Christopher R. Tunnell said that given the "...depraved actions and the gruesome evidence", he would seek the death penalty.

Shawn Grate was also charged in the deaths of his former girlfriends Candice Cunningham and Rebekah Leicy in neighboring Richland County, and was also charged in the death of Dana Nicole Lowrey, 23, who died in 2006 and was found in 2007 in Marion County. In the second of two letters he sent to Cleveland news station WEWS (News 5 Cleveland) reporter Megan Hickey, Grate attributed his motives to "government assistance", writing that it took his victims' minds. "They were already dead, just their bodies were flopping wherever it can flop but their minds were already dead! The state took their minds. Once they started receiving their monthly checks." Grate claimed he once received a $197 food card and that he "never was able to receive any encouragement, though many bodies received 700".

After Grate gave details of the murders to two news organizations while in custody, attorneys for the defense and prosecution jointly requested and obtained a gag order preventing Grate from communicating any further with the media. On January 6, 2017, a competency hearing determined Grate fit to stand trial. An evaluation released March 6, based on a January 17 assessment to evaluate Grate's claim of insanity, declared that he was not insane at the time the crimes were committed. Grate's counsel then withdrew the plea of not guilty by reason of insanity on April 7, 2017.

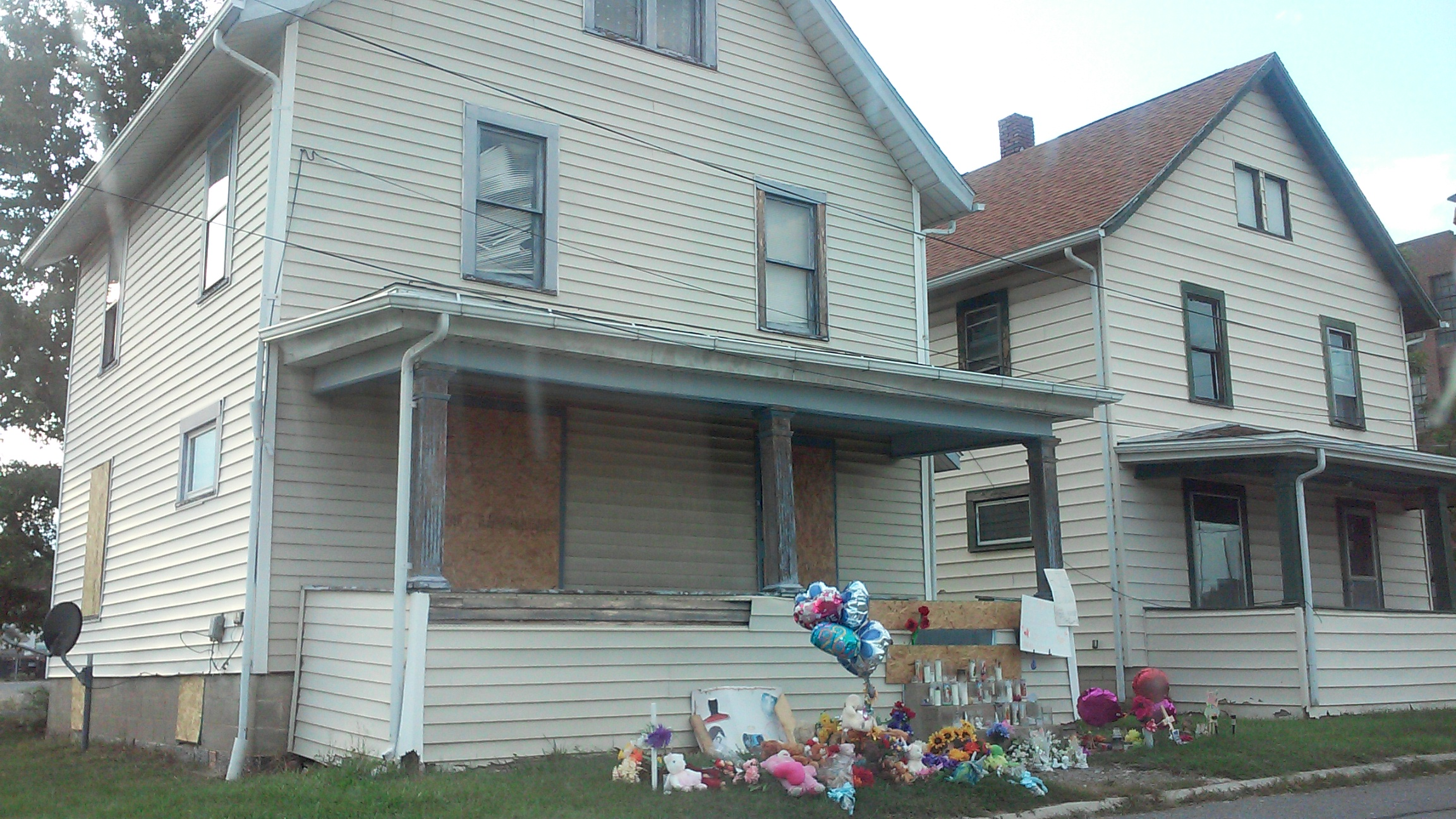
363 Covert Court in Ashland, Ohio, where Grate was arrested. A public memorial is in front of the house. The house has since been demolished.

In a settlement with the owner, the City of Ashland obtained ownership of the house where Grate was apprehended, two bodies were discovered, and police rescued a kidnapped woman. The city pursued a federal grant intending to demolish the house. According to Andrew Bush, assistant law director for the city of Ashland:

"There is a settlement agreement among the parties that essentially obligates the Pump House to transfer all property that is the subject of this action to the city of Ashland and transfer their title thereto, provided that the city pays off the sums owed to the county for delinquent taxes and to the Muskingum Watershed District."

Grate's trial for the Ashland crimes began with two weeks of jury selection on April 9, 2018. The trial began with opening statements on April 23. On May 2, Grate, who showed no remorse pleaded guilty to 15 of the charges against him. On May 7, Grate was found guilty of murdering Stacey Stanley and Elizabeth Griffith. On June 1, Grate was sentenced to death. An initial execution date was set upon conviction for September 13, 2018, but the execution was stayed due to a pending appeal to the Ohio Supreme Court.

The defense counsel in the trial was Robert Whitney and Rolf Whitney. The prosecution team was Ashland Prosecutor Chris Tunnell, Medina County Assistant Prosecutor Michael McNamara, and Special Prosecutor Mark Weaver.

On March 1, 2019, Grate pleaded guilty to the murders of Rebekah Leicy and Candice Cunningham and was sentenced to life in prison without parole for the murder of Leicy and 17 years to life for the other charges, with the sentences running consecutively.

On September 11, 2019, Grate pleaded guilty to the murder of Dana Lowrey and was sentenced to life in prison without parole plus 16 years.

On December 10, 2020, it was reported that Grate lost his appeal against the death sentence, with the Ohio Supreme Court upholding the sentence by stating there is no mitigation or "reversible error" in Grate's case on the grounds of dismissing the appeal. Grate was scheduled to be executed on March 19, 2025 but the date was delayed due to ongoing appeals. The method of execution is to be determined; Ohio no longer uses lethal injection as of 2020, but state law does not currently permit any other method.

== Victims ==
=== Survived Jane Doe ===
While Grate slept, the victim identified by the indictment only as "Jane Doe" called 911 from the Ashland house where Grate had bound her to a bed and held her for three days, during which time he sexually assaulted her. She was safely rescued by the Ashland police. Since she was the victim of a sexual assault, police declined to reveal her identity. Grate claims he did not plan to kill her and that they were going to get married.

Having seen Shawn as something of an "older brother," the 38-year-old Doe had first met Grate in the summer of 2016 at the Ashland Salvation Army Ray & Joan Kroc Corps Community Center. There they would share lunch and go on long walks, frequently discussing the Bible and occasionally playing tennis at Brookside Park in Ashland. Despite Grate's attempts to sexually engage her, her relationship with him was described as completely platonic, refusing to exchange phone numbers.

On September 11, 2016, Grate persuaded Doe to walk with him to the Ashland house on 363 Covert Court to receive some clothes he had in his possession. As Doe read the Bible in Grate's room, his friendly demeanor changed as he returned from the house's kitchen; Grate pulled the Bible out of her hand, telling her that she was not "going anywhere." Doe resisted Grate, after which he beat and strangled her.

Grate then proceeded to bind her in various "weird positions", including one that would allegedly strangle her to death as she attempted to break free. During the three-day assault, she had sustained extensive bruising and head and sexual orifice traumas and was bleeding from the vagina; she said she had been sexually assaulted by Grate in "every way imaginable." During the assault, Grate had also shaved a heart shape into her pubic hair, which was removed following an examination by a sexual assault forensic examiner.

=== Stacey Stanley a.k.a. Stacey Hicks ===
Stanley's family had reported her missing the week before Grate was arrested. Her body was found at the Ashland house where Grate was arrested. She is also known as Stacy Hicks. An autopsy concluded she was strangled to death.

=== Elizabeth Griffith ===
Elizabeth Griffith had been missing for about a month before Grate was arrested. Her body was found at the Ashland house where Grate was arrested. An autopsy concluded she was strangled to death.

=== Candice Cunningham ===
Candice Cunningham was 29 years old and believed she had found the perfect guy when she met Grate. They had a 5-year on-and-off relationship. Grate led police to what he said was Cunningham's body in neighboring Richland County on the day of his arrest. Police found the body behind a house that had burned down. He had confessed to killing her in June 2016, but not before she endured around 3 days of torture. Grate described her as "a problem." The Richland County Sheriff's office officially confirmed on November 1, 2016, that the body found was Cunningham's.

=== Rebekah Leicy ===
Based on information supplied by Grate, police reopened the investigation into Leicy's death. Her body was found in March 2015, and her death was originally ruled a drug overdose. Grate says he strangled her after she stole $4 from him in his place of work.

=== Dana Lowrey ===
Grate claims to have killed another woman who was found dead in Marion County, Ohio in 2006 and remained unidentified for 13 years. Grate stated he believed her name was Dana. In January 2018, isotope analysis indicated she was likely from the Southern United States. The victim was identified in June 2019 by the DNA Doe Project as Dana Nicole Lowrey, 23, of Minden, Louisiana. At the time of her death Lowrey had two daughters aged 1 and 5 and was separated from their father.

According to his confession, he met Dana when she came to the house he was living at in Marion, Ohio. She pitched a sale of magazines to Grate's mother, and after his mother picked out a magazine, she paid by check. One of such magazines was The Cat in the Hat series. The magazines never arrived. After months of his mother complaining and cursing Dana for the scam, he tracked her down. By his confession, she tried selling him a magazine so he led her back to the house when he was home alone, and strangled her to death after a confrontation about the scam. He then dragged her down to the basement where he stabbed her in the neck. The next day the body was dumped in a wooded area. Three months later, he returned and set the body on fire. The knife he used to stab was also put into the fire as well with the intention of ruining fingerprints. By his accounts, the flies were "working on it" by the time he returned.

== See also ==
- List of death row inmates in the United States § Ohio
- List of people scheduled to be executed in the United States
- List of serial killers in the United States
