= William Sapp (serial killer) =

American serial killer on death row

- Born: William Kessler Lilly; March 22, 1962 (age 64); Springfield, Ohio, U.S.
- Other names: Bob Sapp; Robert Lancaster; Bill Sapp
- Convictions: Aggravated murder (3 counts); Kidnapping (5 counts); Rape (4 counts); Attempted murder (2 counts); Felonious assault Attempted rape Tampering with evidence (3 counts); Abuse of corpse (3 counts)
- Penalty: Death (October 21, 1999)

Details
- Victims: 3+
- Span of crimes: 1981(?) 1992 – 1993
- Country: United States
- States: Ohio, Florida
- Date apprehended: October 10, 1996
- Imprisoned at: Ross Correctional Institution

William Kessler Sapp (born William Kessler Lilly; March 22, 1962) is an American serial killer and rapist who committed the murders of three women and girls in Springfield, Ohio, in 1992 and 1993, the attempted murder of another, and a possible fourth murder in Florida. Sapp was detained for the murders in 1996, while he was imprisoned for an earlier rape. He was sentenced to death on October 21, 1999, and is currently awaiting execution at the Ross Correctional Institution.

== Criminal activity ==
William Kessler Lilly was born on March 22, 1962, in Springfield, Ohio. He had one younger brother, and according to Children's services, young William had "hostility toward all women he [came] in contact with." When he was nine, his parents divorced, and he and his brother went to live with his father and step-mother, who they later claimed physically and mentally abused them.

Lilly committed his first crime on March 20, 1980, when he was arrested on charges of animal cruelty. The next year, he moved to Jacksonville, Florida, where he was legally adopted by a man named Al Sapp, which caused Lilly to change his last name to Sapp. In 1988, Sapp married a woman named Karen, and together they moved back to Ohio, settling in Sapp's hometown of Springfield and having three children. (born 1988, 1994, and 1995). In 1991, Sapp set fire to a log cabin close in proximity to his father's home.

On August 23, 1992, the bodies of 12-year-old Phree Morrow and 11-year-old Martha Leach were discovered near a pond behind Penn Street. The girls were described as “best friends,” and they were determined to have been killed the previous day when the two were returning to Martha's home from a bakery.

On July 8, 1995, a couple found the body of 30-year-old Belinda Fay Anderson under their garage in Springfield. Anderson was found to have been killed back in September 1993 after she went missing on her way to her parents' house.

== Revelation ==
On February 27, 1996, Sapp was arrested on charges of attempting to kill Una Timmons, who, on February 5, was beaten and stabbed by Sapp after he offered her a ride and smoked cocaine with her. On September 9, he went on trial, pleading not guilty by reason of insanity. During the trial, investigators from Jacksonville, Florida, visited Sapp in his jail cell. At the time, they were investigating his possible involvement in unsolved cases that occurred while he was living there. Sapp gave information but blamed crimes on a man named Robert Lancaster, who he claimed killed 56-year-old Shirley Ogden on West Main Street in April 1981. At the same time, a Sample of Sapp's DNA was seized and collected by the FBI, who were able to confirm his role in the murders of Phree Morrow and Martha Leach.

Detectives sought to interview Sapp after the tests were complete. In the interview, Sapp confessed to the murders, as well as to the murder of Anderson. By the time Sapp was connected to the crimes, two men, David Marciszewski (born June 3, 1959) and John Balser (born December 21, 1969) were already serving time for their role in the murders of Marrow and Leach. Despite this, investigators proved that both men were involved as accomplices, while Sapp was the ringleader, and their convictions were upheld. Another man, Jamie Turner (born November 11, 1971), was also convicted for his role in Morrow and Leach murders, and he was sentenced to life imprisonment on November 13, 1998. On October 13, 1999, Sapp was convicted of the murders of Phree Morrow, Martha Leach, and Belinda Anderson; days later, he was sentenced to death. Sapp signed over parental rights of his children to his wife, though she later relinquished custody as well. They became state wards until 2001, when they were placed with a local family.

== See also ==
- List of serial killers in the United States
- List of death row inmates in the United States

== Bibliography ==
- Carol J. Rothgeb (June 2011). Hometown Killer. Pinnacle Books. ISBN 9780786026883.
