= Murder of Justin Back =

American murder victim

Justin Back
- Born: February 13, 1995
- Died: January 28, 2014 (aged 18); Waynesville, Ohio, U.S.
- Cause of death: Stab wounds
- Known for: Murder case

On January 28, 2014, 18-year-old Justin Michael Back (February 13, 1995 – January 28, 2014) was murdered in Waynesville, Ohio, United States. Austin Gregory Myers (born January 4, 1995) and Timothy E. Mosley (born October 11, 1994) were convicted of murdering Back at his family home in order to steal a safe from the house. The case received national media attention because of the discrepancy in the sentencing of the two young offenders.

== Background ==
Myers and Back had attended the same middle school together and were childhood friends in seventh and eighth grade. Back was a 2013 Waynesville High School graduate, and before his murder, he was about to enter the Navy. According to Mosley's statement, Myers had asked Mosley if he wanted to make some money. Mosley was interested, and the pair discussed whether to rob a drug dealer or the stepfather of Back, Mark Cates. Myers knew that Cates had a safe containing money and a gun left in the family home. Myers believed Cates kept a total of $20,000 in his safe. The two drove to Back's home in Waynesville planning to burgle the safe, but they realized Back was home and decided against it. The two left and discussed how they could acquire the money. Myers allegedly came up with the idea of killing Back. Eventually, Myers decided to strangle Back with a wire and then declared he and Mosley could take the safe, planning on making it look like Back had stolen the safe and run away from home. Myers bought a three-foot length steel cable and two metal rope cleats. He intended to fashion a garrote, or "choke wire," as Mosley referred to it. They assembled the garrote and planned to carry out the murder the following day.

== Murder ==
On the morning of January 28, 2014, Myers and Mosley purchased septic enzymes, ammonia, septic tank cleaner, and rubber gloves. They then drove to Back's home and arrived around 1:00 p.m. The plan was for Myers to distract Back while Mosley strangled him with the garrote. Mosley armed himself with the garrote as well as a six-inch pocketknife. Myers knocked on the door of the family home, and Back let the pair inside. The three men talked for a while, and afterward, Back went to the kitchen. Seeing the opportunity, Mosley attacked Back from behind and attempted to strangle him, while Myers held Back from the front. Back fought against them, and the three men struggled, resulting in all of them falling onto the kitchen floor. Myers notified Mosley that the wire was across Back's chin instead of around his neck. A panicked Mosley then pulled out his knife and stabbed Back from behind. Afterward, Myers placed the garrote around Back's throat while Mosley stabbed Back in the chest, killing him. Back was stabbed a total of 21 times.

After Back died, Mosley and Myers searched for the safe and found it in a closet. The safe, however, was locked. Myers also found a handgun in the home belonging to Cates, which he loaded. The pair returned to the kitchen, where they attempted to clean up the crime scene using ammonia. They wrapped Back's body in a blanket and put it in the trunk of Mosley's car. They then ransacked the house, taking the safe and some jewelry and credit cards. Myers also filled some bags with Back's clothing. They loaded everything into Mosley's car and left the house around 2:00 p.m.

== Aftermath ==
While driving, Mosley became paranoid about being followed, so he took side roads to a remote area, where he parked and checked outside the car for blood. Myers searched for Back's wallet, which he located in one of the bags. The wallet contained more than $100, which Myers took. The two then drove back to Mosley's house, where they unloaded items from the car to Mosley's bedroom. Together, they dragged the safe up the stairs and changed their clothes. Mosley proposed dumping the body near West Alexandria, as he knew the area well. They decided to hide the body behind a log in a field near the village of Gratis in Preble County. Mosley drove into the field, stopping about 20 feet from the log. The pair carried the body to the log and laid it on the ground. Myers then poured ammonia and septic enzymes onto the corpse, which was still clothed and partly wrapped in the blanket. According to Mosley, Myers wanted to shoot the body, so Mosley got the stolen gun from the car and handed it to Myers, who fired two shots into Back's body. The gun jammed on the third shot. Myers cleared the jam, ejecting the bullet to the ground, where the police later found it.

After they hid the body, Myers suggested they kill Cates to make it look like he had killed Back and disappeared. Deciding against it, the men drove to a park in Brookville, where Mosley tossed Back's laptop into a dumpster. They bought a crowbar in Englewood and went back to Mosley's house to crack open the safe. Instead of the $20,000 that Myers had promised, the safe contained some paperwork, loose change, bullets, gun accessories, and other random items. Myers and Mosley separated items that they thought they could sell. Afterward, they burned the papers, several trash bags containing evidence of the crime, and their bloody clothes in a fire pit in the backyard. Myers and Mosley put everything that looked valuable from the house and safe into a bag. They then drove to Tipp City, where they threw Cates's safe into a river.

== Investigation ==
Cates came home from work around 3:30 p.m. realizing that a table had been moved and some rugs were missing. Later, he and his wife found his safe and his handgun missing. They called the police and tried to contact Back, but discovered his cell phone had been left inside the house. During the investigation, officers described a car that had been seen outside Back's home (with a distinctive missing back window, covered in plastic and red tape). Cates told police that Myers had visited their home the day before in that same car. Warren County sheriff's detectives searched for Myers and the suspicious vehicle. The car was located by Clayton police, who detained Myers at Mosley's house and notified the Warren County detectives. Detectives interviewed Myers at Clayton police station on January 29. Myers denied knowing anything about Back's disappearance or the burglary at Back's home. After the interview, Myers was taken back to Mosley's house, and Mosley was taken to the station for questioning. When the detectives finished talking with Mosley, he was returned to his house also. Based on what they learned, the detectives had Clayton police officers arrest Mosley and Myers and return them to the station. The detectives again interviewed Mosley and then Myers.

Myers eventually admitted that he had been present when Mosley stabbed Back. He said that when he had gone to hang out with Back on January 28, he did not know that Mosley was going to kill Back, nor did he know why Mosley had killed Back. Myers denied shooting Back's body, claiming that Mosley had done that instead. In adjacent holding cells, Mosley overheard Myers implicating him alone for the murder. When the detectives interviewed Mosley, he confessed to the crime but implicated Myers in planning the burglary. Following Mosley's confession, the detectives interviewed Myers again, who changed his story. This time, he admitted shooting the body (in a foolish attempt at misdirection) and acknowledged buying the materials to make the garrote (+ septic tank enzymes & gloves). He continued to deny that he had restrained Back during the murder, insisting he was not even aware he was being stabbed at the time but merely punched, claiming he was left in a state of shock and disbelief on seeing all the blood.

The same day, Preble County sheriff's deputies found Back's body (after approximate directions from Myers). A Montgomery County coroner autopsy determined that Back had died of multiple stab wounds.

== Trial ==
Austin Gregory Myers

Timothy E. Mosley

The case received attention because Mosley, who used the knife to murder Back, received a sentence of life without parole because of a plea bargain, while Myers received a death sentence. Myers became the youngest inmate on death row in Ohio at the time. The murder caused proposed changes in Ohio state law to increase penalties for murder, named "Justin's Law" after Back.

Myers was sentenced to death at 19 on October 16, 2014. He is currently on death row awaiting execution and is imprisoned in Ross Correctional Institution. Mosley was sentenced to life in prison on November 14, 2014. He is imprisoned in London Correctional Institution.

== Media coverage ==
The case also received international coverage with the BBC covering it as part of a BBC Three documentary series on capital punishment in the United States - Life and Death Row - (series 2, episode 3).

== See also ==
- List of death row inmates in the United States
- List of people scheduled to be executed in the United States
