= Anthony Kirkland =

American serial killer on death row

- c. 2020 mugshot
- Born: September 13, 1968 (age 58); Cincinnati, Ohio, U.S.
- Convictions: Aggravated murder (four counts); Murder (two counts); Attempted rape (two counts); Aggravated robbery (two counts); Abuse of a corpse (four counts); Voluntary Manslaughter (one count); Aggravated arson (one count); Importuning (one count)
- Penalty: Death

Details
- Victims: 5
- Span of crimes: 1987–2009
- Country: United States
- State: Ohio
- Date apprehended: March 8, 2009 (for the final time)
- Imprisoned at: Ohio State Penitentiary

Anthony Wayne Kirkland (born September 13, 1968) is an American serial killer. Between 2006 and 2009, Kirkland murdered two women and two girls in the Cincinnati area, following a 16-year prison term for the 1987 killing of his girlfriend.

== Early life ==
Kirkland was born in Cincinnati, Ohio, on September 13, 1968, to Carol Yvonne Kirkland, an unwed 17-year-old mother. His birth certificate lists his biological father as Donald Pettijohn. When Kirkland was 18, his mother married Clarence Spencer. His defense attorneys have claimed that he experienced physical and mental abuse during his childhood.

== 1987 killing ==
On May 20, 1987, Kirkland raped and murdered his girlfriend, Leola Douglas, after she refused to have sex with him. He then set her body on fire to conceal evidence of the rape. Kirkland pleaded guilty to voluntary manslaughter and was sentenced to 10 to 25 years in prison.

Kirkland obtained his GED and an associate degree in prison. However, he had multiple infractions in prison. Between 1998 and 2003, Kirkland was placed in solitary confinement 21 times for "disciplinary control." In the last nine months of his time in prison, he was sent to solitary four times for breaking the rules or fighting other inmates.

Kirkland was initially denied parole due to the severity of his crimes. However, he benefited from a ruling by the Ohio Supreme Court declaring that parole-eligible inmates had to be judged by their conviction and not just the crime. Therefore, Kirkland was subject to more lenient guidelines for a voluntary manslaughter conviction. Kirkland was paroled in 2004, having served 16 years of his sentence.

== 2006–2009 murders ==
From May 4, 2006, through March 7, 2009, Kirkland murdered four females (two women and two teenagers), three of them by strangulation. In each case, he had burned his victim's body to conceal evidence of rape. Kirkland was arrested near the scene of his last murder victim in possession of her watch and iPod.

== Victims ==
Kirkland's five victims were:

- Leola Douglas, age 27, killed May 20, 1987;
- Casonya Crawford, age 14, murdered May 4, 2006;
- Mary Jo Newton, age 45, murdered June 14, 2006;
- Kimya Rolison, age 25, murdered December 22, 2006; and
- Esme Kenney, age 13, murdered March 7, 2009.

== Trial ==
On the morning of his trial, Kirkland entered a plea guilty to the murder and abuse-of-a-corpse charges relating to Mary Jo Newton and Kimya Rolison. On March 12, 2010, the jury found Kirkland guilty on all the remaining counts, including all the death-penalty specifications. The jury recommended a sentence of death. He was sentenced to death on March 31, 2010.

The court sentenced Kirkland to death for the aggravated murder of Esme Kenney (while committing or attempting to commit rape) and for the aggravated murder of Casonya Crawford (while committing or attempting to commit a robbery). The court also sentenced Kirkland to 70 years to life for the murders of Mary Jo Newton and Kimya Rolison.

== Appeals ==
On May 13, 2014, the Supreme Court of Ohio upheld Kirkland's conviction and death sentence.

On October 16, 2014, the Supreme Court of Ohio granted a motion by Kirkland for a stay of execution.

On April 6, 2015, the U.S. Supreme Court refused to hear Kirkland's appeal.

In May 2016, the Supreme Court of Ohio granted a motion for a new sentencing hearing for Kirkland.

On November 9, 2017, Perry Ancona and Norm Aubin, Kirkland's most recent attorneys, successfully requested to Judge Patrick Dinkelacker of the Hamilton County Court of Common Pleas that they be removed from the case. According to them and prosecutor Mark Piepmeier, an attorney with the state public defender's office who is not Kirkland's attorney of record has been discussing the case and his sentencing with him.

Kirkland's resentencing hearing began with opening statements on July 25, 2018. On August 6, 2018, the jury recommended that Kirkland should be sentenced to death.

On August 28, 2018, a Hamilton County judge agreed with the jury's recommendation and sentenced Kirkland to death. Kirkland is presently incarcerated at Ohio State Penitentiary in Youngstown, Ohio.

== See also ==
- List of death row inmates in the United States
- List of serial killers in the United States
