= Gregory McKnight =

American serial killer on death row

- McKnight on death row
- Born: Gregory B. McKnight; November 14, 1976 (age 49); United States
- Convictions: Aggravated murder; Murder; Kidnapping; Receiving stolen property; Aggravated robbery; Complicity to burglary
- Penalty: Death

Details
- Victims: 3
- Span of crimes: 1992–2000
- Country: United States
- State: Ohio
- Date apprehended: December 9, 2000
- Imprisoned at: Ross Correctional Institution

Gregory B. McKnight (born November 14, 1976) is an American serial killer who murdered two people and hid their bodies on his property in Vinton County, Ohio, from May to November 2000. This followed his release from prison after killing a man in Columbus in 1992 when he was a teenager. McKnight was sentenced to death in 2002 and is currently awaiting execution.

== Early life ==
Gregory McKnight was born November 14, 1976. He was raised in Queens, New York.

== Murders ==
In 1992, McKnight, then 15, robbed and fatally shot a man in Columbus, Ohio. He was arrested and convicted under a juvenile court and sentenced to serve a short sentence at the Circleville Youth Center. He was released in 1997 and later married a woman named Kathryn, who had worked at the Youth Center.

On May 13, 2000, McKnight abducted 20-year-old Gregory Julious, an acquaintance of his, and killed him. He then dismembered his body and hid it in his yard. Six months later, on October 11, McKnight and two acquaintances broke into a home and stole several firearms. On November 3, McKnight abducted 20-year-old Kenyon College student Emily Murray, a co-worker of his at a restaurant. He discreetly followed Murray as she walked home and kidnapped her, taking her to his house, and fatally shot her once in the head. He wrapped her body in a carpet and hid it in his trailer.

A month later, Gregory McKnight was arrested when Murray's car was found in the driveway of a property he owned. In a further search of the property, Murray's decomposed body was found in McKnight's trailer. Bones matching Julious were also found.

== Trial ==
McKnight's wife, Kathryn, was released from custody once police ruled out her involvement in the homicides. Shortly before Gregory McKnight's trial, three locals trespassed on his former property and reportedly stole a few items. The trespassers, Rosalee Jackson, Kenneth R. Jackson, and Jeffrey A. Jackson, were each indicted on a misdemeanor count of criminal trespassing and theft.

Since McKnight's trial was due to occur in Vinton County, which held around 13,000 residents, Ohio judge Jeffrey Simmons briefly ruled out the death penalty in the trial due to Vinton County lacking enough money to guarantee McKnight a fair trial. The trial nevertheless proceeded on October 1, 2002. Despite the argument about the cost of a fair trial, McKnight still faced a death sentence if convicted. To convince the jury of McKnight's guilt, prosecutors collected items previously seized from his residence; a shovel, a brush cutter, an axe, and a hunting knife were compared to marks of Julious' bones, but the shovel was ruled out, and the other items were inconclusive. Due to uncertainty over how Julious was killed, prosecutors decided not to seek the death penalty for his murder. They did seek the death penalty for Murray's murder since they knew he had shot her once in the head.

At the end of the trial, after less than an hour of deliberating, McKnight was convicted of all charges: murder, aggravated murder, kidnapping, aggravated robbery, receiving stolen property, and complicity. The jury sentenced him to death for the aggravated murder charge, life imprisonment for the murder charge, ten years for the kidnapping charge, eight years for the complicity charge, and 1 1/2 years for receiving stolen property.

McKnight arrived on Ohio's death row following his sentencing. In 2015, McKnight volunteered for execution, saying he wanted to die for his crimes. He later recanted that statement.

=== Allegations of racial bias ===
During a hearing in 2005, McKnight's attorney, a state public defender named Robert Lowe, argued that there was racial bias in the state's decision to not charge McKnight with kidnapping Julious, who was black. The justification the state gave for charging McKnight with kidnapping Murray, who was white, was that McKnight "did not release [Murray] in a safe place unharmed." Attaching kidnapping charges to Murray's murder allowed the state to seek the death penalty against McKnight, as kidnapping served as an aggravating circumstance that justified capital murder charges. Despite elements in Julious's case being nearly identical, the state chose not to seek the death penalty for Julious's murder. Judge Paul Pfeifer oversaw the hearing and questioned the state's decision to not only charge McKnight with only kidnapping his white victim and not his black victim, given that the elements in Julious's case were similar to the elements in Murray's case, but to also charge McKnight with kidnapping at all, given that both victims were last seen alive outside of Vinton County. However, eight months later, the Supreme Court of Ohio upheld McKnight's conviction by a 6–1 vote, with Pfeifer dissenting.

In 2020, McKnight alleged racism during his trial and claimed white jurors had been heard making racial slurs.

McKnight is awaiting execution at Chillicothe Correctional Institution.

== See also ==
- List of death row inmates in the United States
- List of serial killers in the United States
