= Madison Correctional Institution (Ohio) =

Prison in Ohio, United States

Coordinates: 39°54′36″N 83°28′13″W

- Interactive map of Madison Correctional Institution
- Location: 1851 OH-56 London, Ohio
- Status: open
- Security class: mixed
- Capacity: 2258
- Opened: 1987
- Managed by: Ohio Department of Rehabilitation and Correction

not to be confused with the Madison Correctional Institution, Madison, Florida

The Madison Correctional Institution (MaCI) is a state prison for men located in London, Madison County, Ohio. First opened in 1987, the facility has a working population of 2258 inmates, with a mix of security levels (minimum, medium, close, and a few max and super max).

The facility is less than a mile from another Ohio state prison, London Correctional Institution.

== Notable inmates ==
Inmate Name	Inmate Number	Status	Details
Chad South	A684079	Died in prison while serving a sentence of life with the possibility of parole after 28 years.	South was hired to kill a "Daniel Ott" and proceeded to do so except he killed the wrong Daniel Ott in 2006.
Damico Watkins	A299646	Died in prison while serving a sentence of 5 to 25 years for aggravated robbery.	Watkins was killed by a group of white inmates who were part of the prison's Aryan Brotherhood gang.
David Carroll	A546573	Serving a sentence of life with the possibility of parole after 15 years.	Assisted in the murder of 3-year-old Marcus Fiesel while he was in his foster custody.
Stephen Beightler	A748937	Present at facility from February 2019 to November 2019	Former model convicted of felonious assault, sentenced to 8 years
