= Quisi Bryan =

American rapist & murderer (born 1970)

- Mug shot of Bryan
- Born: October 2, 1970 (age 56)
- Status: Incarcerated on death row
- Motive: To avoid arrest
- Convictions: Aggravated murder (x2); Attempted murder (x2); Attempted robbery; Carrying a concealed weapon; Weapon under disability; Tampering with evidence; Theft; Sexual battery (x3); Abduction (x3); Impersonating a police officer; Rape; Kidnapping
- Penalty: Death (December 6, 2000)

Details
- Victims: Wayne Leon
- Date apprehended: June 25, 2000
- Imprisoned at: Ross Correctional Institution

Quisi Bryan (born October 2, 1970) is an American man convicted of murdering Cleveland police officer Wayne Allan Leon (June 21, 1968 – June 25, 2000) during a traffic stop in 2000. Bryan is on death row in Ohio and is currently scheduled to be executed on November 15, 2028.

Bryan was additionally convicted of several sexual assaults prior to murdering Leon for which he received additional prison sentences. He remains incarcerated at the Ross Correctional Institution.

== Murder of Wayne Leon ==
Wayne Leon

On June 25, 2000, 32-year-old Cleveland police officer Wayne Leon was fatally shot while conducting a traffic stop in Cleveland, Ohio. Leon who was on routine patrol when he noticed irregularities with the temporary license tag displayed on a white Pontiac Grand Prix driven by Bryan who was wanted at the time on outstanding warrants related to a parole violation. At approximately 11:00 a.m., Bryan pulled into a Sunoco gas station with Leon pulling up behind him.

Leon examined the temporary tag and determined that it had been altered. He then obtained Bryan's driver's license and began using his police radio to conduct a records check. While Leon was standing beside his cruiser, Bryan drew a .45-caliber Glock semiautomatic handgun from his coat and shot Bryan in the face at close range. Bryan retrieved his driver's license from the fallen officer and fled the scene.

Kenneth Niedhammer, a private security agent witnessed the shooting after hearing the gunshot and seeing Leon on the ground. Niedhammer pursued Bryan in his vehicle where Bryan fired several shots toward Niedhammer. One bullet struck a spotlight on Niedhammer's vehicle approximately six to eight inches from his head, while a ricochet injured his forearm. Another bullet struck the window of a nearby residence. Niedhammer returned fire, and Bryan subsequently drove away before stopping and exchanging gunfire with him a second time.

Bryan eventually lost control of the vehicle and crashed into several vehicles . He abandoned the vehicle and fled on foot with his handgun and backpack. He later discarded the Glock in a trash bin, obtained another vehicle and traveled with his girlfriend to Columbus where he discussed plans to leave Ohio and eventually the United States. Cleveland investigators identified Bryan as the principal suspect after tracing the temporary license tag on the abandoned Pontiac and circulated information about the vehicle he was subsequently driving. Later on the same day of the shooting, Columbus police located Bryan and arrested him without incident.

== Trial ==
On July 5, 2000, a Cuyahoga County grand jury indicted Quisi Bryan in connection with the killing of Cleveland police officer Wayne Leon and the subsequent shooting at private security officer Kenneth Niedhammer. Bryan was initially charged with three counts of aggravated murder. The counts alleged that he purposely killed a law-enforcement officer engaged in his duties, specifically intended to kill a police officer, and committed the killing with prior calculation and design. Each aggravated-murder count carried several death-penalty specifications, including killing a police officer, killing to avoid apprehension or punishment for another offense, and engaging in a course of conduct involving the killing or attempted killing of two or more people. He was also charged with two counts of attempted murder and several weapons-related offenses. Several other firearm-related counts were dismissed before trial.

Bryan officially stood trial on October 23, 2000. His attorneys had requested a continuance, arguing that they needed additional time to investigate the prosecution's extensive witness list and locate potential defense witnesses. The trial court denied the request. The Supreme Court of Ohio later ruled that the denial did not constitute an abuse of discretion, noting that the defense had been supplied discovery material and had access to an investigator, mitigation specialist, and psychologist.

Prosecutors argued that Bryan deliberately shot Leon to prevent the officer from discovering outstanding warrants and taking him into custody. Kenneth Niedhammer testified that he witnessed Leon's shooting at a Cleveland gas station and pursued Bryan's Pontiac Grand Prix. According to Niedhammer, Bryan stopped during the pursuit and fired at him. Prosecutors also presented testimony from Bryan's girlfriend, Janie Winston, who said Bryan admitted during their flight from Cleveland that he had shot a police officer in the face and expressed concern that he would spend the rest of his life in prison if Leon died.

Physical and forensic evidence supported the prosecution's account. Investigators recovered a .45-caliber cartridge case at the scene of Leon's shooting and additional .45-caliber casings and bullet evidence from the location where Niedhammer was fired upon. A firearms examiner testified that the bullet recovered from Leon's body and evidence from the later shooting had been fired from the same type of Glock handgun and that the recovered cartridge cases had been ejected by the same weapon. Gunshot-residue particles were also detected on Bryan's right hand. DNA testing of an inhaler and cigar butts recovered from Bryan's abandoned Grand Prix connected him to the vehicle. The medical examiner testified that Leon died from a single gunshot to the head and neck, fired from approximately two and a half feet away.

Bryan testified in his own defense and admitted shooting Leon but disputed the prosecution's contention that the killing was planned or that he specifically intended to kill the officer. Bryan acknowledged that he knew he faced arrest because of problems involving his parole and a pending criminal investigation. He testified that when Leon began using his police radio, Bryan drew his Glock and pointed it toward the officer's microphone in an attempt to stop him from calling for assistance. According to Bryan, Leon suddenly moved and reached toward his weapon, causing Bryan to pull the trigger as a reflex. Bryan maintained that he had not intended to kill Leon.

During the penalty phase, Bryan's mother, Cassandra Bryan, testified on his behalf and asked that his life be spared. Bryan made an unsworn statement apologizing for Leon's death, describing the shooting as an impulsive act and expressing remorse for the effect his actions had on Leon's family and his own family. The defense also submitted documents concerning Bryan's relationship with his stepchildren and goals he had developed while participating in a community reentry program.

On November 7, 2000, a jury convicted Bryan of murdering Leon and recommended that he be sentenced to death on November 9. The trial court merged duplicative death-penalty specifications and accepted the jury's recommendation. However, the jury acquitted him of the aggravated-murder count alleging prior calculation and design, as well as one count of improperly discharging a firearm. On December 6, 2000, Bryan was sentenced to death for Leon's murder.

=== Sexual assault convictions ===
On January 3, 2007, Bryan pled guilty to several sexual assaults that happened prior to his 2000 crime and was sentenced to up to 48 years in prison. On April 5, 2017, he was resentenced to 22 years in prison for the assaults after the Ohio Supreme Court ruled that judges in five Cuyahoga County rape cases wrongly applied sentences to the law at the time the crime occurred.

On February 27, 2014, Bryan was convicted of raping and kidnapping a woman on March 15, 1994, by the Cuyahoga County Court of Common Pleas. The jury found Bryan not guilty on a second count of rape against the same woman that stemmed from the same incident. Judge David Matia sentenced Bryan to a maximum of 50 years in prison. Bryan was charged with the crime after the woman's rape kit was tested and Bryan's DNA matched. The victim testified at trial that Bryan led her at knife point behind a vacant home on East 93rd Street in Cleveland into an abandoned car and raped her twice. She stated that Bryan threatened to kill her if she did not cooperate.

== Appeals ==
Bryan appealed his conviction and death sentence to the Ohio Supreme Court. In his direct appeal, Bryan raised 19 propositions of law challenging various aspects of his trial and sentencing. On March 17, 2004, the court rejected his claims and affirmed both his convictions and death sentence. His motion for reconsideration was subsequently denied on May 12, 2004.

On November 18, 2005, the Cuyahoga County Court of Common Pleas denied Bryan post-conviction relief after Bryan argued that his trial attorneys had provided ineffective assistance during the guilt and penalty phases of his trial On October 10, 2006, Ohio Court of Appeals dismissed Bryan's appeal because the trial court had failed to rule on two of the claims, meaning there was not yet a final appealable order. Bryan was denied post-conviction relief again on May 11, 2009.

On May 13, 2010, the Eighth District Court of Appeals affirmed the denial of post-conviction relief, rejecting his claims concerning ineffective assistance of counsel, the denial of discovery, and his request for funding for a neuropsychologist. The Supreme Court of Ohio declined further review on December 15, 2010.

Bryan then sought a federal Habeas corpus in the U.S. District Court for the Northern District of Ohio. On July 16, 2015, Senior U.S. District Judge James G. Carr granted Bryan relief on one of his claims, concluding that the prosecution had violated Batson v. Kentucky by using a peremptory challenge to remove an African-American prospective juror. The court ordered Ohio to release Bryan unless it began proceedings for a new trial within 120 days.

On December 15, 2016, a divided panel of the U.S. Court of Appeals for the Sixth Circuit reversed the portion of the district court's ruling granting habeas relief. The majority concluded that, under the deferential standard governing federal habeas review, the Ohio courts had not acted unreasonably in accepting the prosecution's race-neutral explanations for striking the juror. The Sixth Circuit therefore vacated the grant of habeas corpus and remanded the case for dismissal of Bryan's petition, while affirming the rejection of his remaining claims. On October 2, 2017, Bryan's petition for a writ of certiorari was denied.

On March 29, 2018, Bryan sought permission for a new mitigation-phase trial, arguing that Ohio's capital-sentencing procedures violated his Sixth and Fourteenth Amendment rights. The trial court denied the motion and the Eighth District Court of Appeals affirmed, holding that Bryan had waited too long to file the motion.

On February 19, 2019, the U.S. Court of Appeals for the Sixth Circuit denied Bryan permission to file a second habeas petition rejecting his request to return to the district court to argue that the Ohio Supreme Court's independent reweighing of aggravating and mitigating circumstances was unconstitutional under Hurst v. Florida. On October 7, 2019, the U.S. Supreme Court denied Bryan's petition for certiorari.

== Scheduled execution ==
Bryan was scheduled to be executed on October 26, 2022, at the Southern Ohio Correctional Facility. On June 24, 2022, Bryan's execution was delayed to January 7, 2026. On June 20, 2025, his execution was once again delayed to November 15, 2028.

== See also ==
- Capital punishment in Ohio
- List of death row inmates in the United States
- List of people scheduled to be executed in the United States
- List of death row inmates in the United States § Ohio
