= Michael Madison =

American serial killer and sex offender

- Madison in an East Cleveland Police Dept. Booking Photo
- Born: October 15, 1977 (age 49); East Cleveland, Ohio, U.S.
- Status: Incarcerated
- Motive: Sexual gratification
- Convictions: Sexually motivated aggravated murder (three counts); Kidnapping (three counts); Rape; Attempted rape; Abuse of a corpse (three counts); Having a weapon under a disability
- Penalty: Death

Details
- Victims: 3+
- Span of crimes: 2012–2013
- Country: United States
- State: Ohio
- Date apprehended: July 19, 2013
- Imprisoned at: Ross Correctional Institution

Michael Madison (born October 15, 1977) is an American serial killer and rapist from East Cleveland, Ohio who is known to have committed the murders of at least three women over a nine-month period in 2012 and 2013. He was arrested and charged with the crimes in 2013 and was sentenced to death in 2016.

== Early life ==
Madison was born on October 15, 1977, to Diane Madison and John Baldwin, the result of an accidental pregnancy. Baldwin denied that he was the father and had no contact with Madison.

Growing up, Madison was allegedly severely abused by his mother, as well as her boyfriends.

== Arrest ==
On July 19, 2013, police responding to reports of a foul odor discovered the decomposing corpse of a woman lying inside a garage leased to Madison. The next day, two more bodies were found nearby: one in a backyard and the other in the basement of a vacant house. Each was wrapped in plastic bags. After obtaining a search warrant, police entered Madison's apartment and found "further evidence of decomposition". After a brief standoff with police at his mother's house, Madison was taken into custody without incident.

The victims were identified as:

- Shetisha Sheeley, 28, who had been missing since September 2012.
- Angela Deskins, 38, a resident of Cleveland who was reported missing in June 2013.
- Shirellda Helen Terry, 18, was last seen July 10, 2013, leaving a Cleveland Elementary School where she had a summer job.

On July 22, 2013, Madison was charged with three counts of aggravated murder. His bail was set at $6 million, and he also waived his right to a preliminary hearing.

== Trial and conviction ==
On October 31, 2013, Madison's attorney David Grant entered a not guilty plea to an updated indictment that included sexually motivated aggravated murder charges; prosecutors had announced that they were now seeking the death penalty, a move his attorney had tried to prevent but had expected. The 14-count updated indictment includes three counts each of aggravated murder for each victim, three counts of kidnapping, three counts of gross abuse of a corpse, one count of rape, and one count of weapons possession by an ex-convict. He had originally been registered as a sex offender in 2002 after serving four years for an attempted rape conviction, having had previous drug convictions in 2000 and 2001.

Madison's trial began on April 4, 2016. On May 5, 2016, Madison was found guilty in the murders of Shirellda Terry, Shetisha Sheeley and Angela Deskins. The jury spent less than one day deliberating before returning a guilty verdict on all 13 counts. Madison told the court he planned to appeal to the Ohio Supreme Court. On May 20, 2016, the jury recommended that Madison should be sentenced to death. On June 2, 2016, Cuyahoga Common Pleas Judge Nancy R. McDonnell sentenced Madison to death. During the sentencing, Madison was seen smirking, which caused Van Terry, Shirellda's father, to lunge at Madison in anger. Terry was released without charges.

The Ohio Supreme Court voted unanimously to uphold the death sentence for Madison on July 21, 2020.

Madison was scheduled to be executed on May 15, 2024, but Ohio Supreme Court Chief Justice Sharon Kennedy granted a stay until all of his appeals were exhausted.

== Mother's killing ==
On June 22, 2019, Diane Madison was stabbed multiple times by her grandson, 18-year-old Jalen Plummer. She died in her home, three years after her son's conviction. Three of her grandchildren were also injured in the attack. Plummer was charged with her murder and three counts of attempted murder. He pleaded guilty to all charges and was sentenced in June 2021 to life in prison with the possibility of parole after 30 years.

== See also ==
- List of death row inmates in the United States
- List of serial killers in the United States
