= Murder of Raymond Fife =

1985 murder and rape of a boy in Ohio

Raymond Fife
- Born: Raymond Charles Fife; January 27, 1973; Trumbull County, Ohio, U.S.
- Died: September 12, 1985 (aged 12); Warren, Ohio, U.S.
- Cause of death: Death by assault and suffocation
- Occupation: Student
- Known for: Victim of a rape-murder case
- Parent(s): Isaac Benjamin Fife (father); Miriam Fife (mother)
- Family: Michael Fife (brother), Paula Lazzari (sister), Yvonne Landis (sister), Regina Manson (sister), Debe Fife (sister-in-law), unnamed nephew

On September 10, 1985, in Warren, Ohio, United States, 12-year-old Boy Scout Raymond Fife (January 27, 1973 – September 12, 1985) disappeared after he was seen going outside to meet a friend. When Fife's family discovered that he had not arrived at his friend's house, they began searching for him. The search lasted more than four hours before Fife's father, Isaac, discovered his body in a wooded field behind a supermarket on Palmyra Road. Fife died two days later from his injuries, which were presumed to have resulted from a physical assault. An autopsy ruled that Fife's death was a homicide and confirmed that he had been raped before he died.

The investigation led to the arrests of two men, Timothy A. Combs (December 21, 1967 – November 9, 2018) and Danny Lee Hill (born January 6, 1967). Both were convicted of raping and murdering Fife. Hill, who was 18 at the time of the crime, was sentenced to death, while Combs, who was 17 at the time of the murder, was spared the death penalty and sentenced to life imprisonment.

Combs died in prison in 2018 at the age of 50. Hill, whose appeals against his death sentence failed, is scheduled for execution on July 18, 2029. He was initially scheduled for execution on July 22, 2026, but the date was postponed by Governor Mike DeWine in January 2026 due to ongoing difficulties experienced by the Ohio Department of Rehabilitation and Correction in obtaining drugs for lethal injections.

== Murder investigation ==
On September 10, 1985, in Warren, Ohio, a 12-year-old boy, Raymond Fife, was last seen leaving his home on a bicycle at approximately 5:15 p.m. Fife was expected to visit his friend Billy Simmons, but by 5:50 p.m., he had not arrived at Simmons's house. Concerned, Fife's family began searching for him.

More than four hours later, Fife's father located him in a wooded field behind a supermarket on Palmyra Road. Fife was found naked and had sustained multiple injuries consistent with a severe physical assault, including burn wounds to his face and extensive bruising to his groin area. His underwear was tied around his neck and appeared to have been burned. Fife was transported to a hospital, where he died two days later as a result of his injuries.

An autopsy determined the cause of death to be "cardiorespiratory arrest secondary to asphyxiation, subdural hematoma, and multiple trauma." The coroner's report indicated that Fife had been strangled and had suffered a brain hemorrhage caused by traumatic injury. The examination also documented multiple burns, injuries to the rectal and bladder areas, and bite marks. The autopsy physician noted numerous external injuries and abrasions, as well as a ligature mark around the victim's neck. Significant rectal bleeding was observed, indicating that a foreign object had been forcibly inserted, causing internal injuries.

On September 12, 1985, the day of Fife's death, an 18-year-old man named Danny Lee Hill went to the Warren Police Station to inquire about a $5,000 reward being offered for information related to the case. Hill told Police Sergeant Thomas Stewart that he had seen several individuals riding a bicycle belonging to Fife. Sergeant Stewart found the statement suspicious, believing that Hill appeared to possess knowledge about specific details of the crime, including the bicycle and the victim's underwear, beyond what had been publicly disclosed.

On September 16, 1985, Hill returned to the police station accompanied by his uncle, Warren Police Detective Morris Hill. During questioning, Hill admitted that he had been present when Fife was assaulted by another individual, whom he identified as 17-year-old Timothy Combs. Combs was subsequently arrested and charged with the rape and murder of Raymond Fife. Hill was also arrested and charged as an accomplice.

== Trials of Danny Lee Hill and Timothy Combs ==
=== Criminal charges and prosecution's stand ===
After their arrests, Hill and Combs were charged with kidnapping, rape, aggravated arson, felonious sexual penetration, aggravated robbery, and aggravated murder. For the most serious charge of aggravated murder, the punishment under Ohio state law was either the death penalty or life imprisonment. It was reported that both Hill and Combs had criminal records for petty offenses under the juvenile system of Ohio.

Based on the evidence presented by the prosecution, it was argued at trial that Hill and Combs abducted Fife while he was riding his bicycle and subsequently sexually abused and violently assaulted him, resulting in fatal injuries. Hill and Combs were tried in different courts for their roles in Fife's killing.

=== Trial and conviction of Danny Lee Hill ===
Danny Lee Hill
- Mug shot of Hill
- Born: January 6, 1967 (age 59); Ohio, U.S.
- Status: Incarcerated on death row
- Convictions: Aggravated murder Aggravated arson Kidnapping; Rape; Felonious sexual penetration
- Penalty: Death penalty (aggravated murder); Two consecutive terms of ten to 25 years' imprisonment (aggravated arson and kidnapping); Two consecutive terms of life imprisonment (felonious sexual penetration and rape)

Details
- Victims: Raymond Fife, 12
- Date: September 10, 1985
- Country: United States
- State: Warren, Ohio
- Imprisoned at: Ross Correctional Institution

On January 7, 1986, Hill waived his right to a jury trial, and on January 21, 1986, Hill stood trial before a court of three judges for the rape and murder of Raymond Fife.

In Hill's confession, he pinpointed Combs as the principal offender, stating that Combs had first knocked Fife off his bicycle, held him in a headlock, and thrown him onto the bike. Hill also stated that Combs was responsible for various acts of violence, including hitting Fife, choking him, and burning him with lighter fluid. While Hill did not admit to direct participation in the assault, he acknowledged staying with the victim while Combs left to retrieve items used in the attack.

However, at trial, Hill's involvement in the sexual assault and murder was found to be greater than he had admitted in his statement. Curtis Mertz, a forensic odontologist, testified that bite marks were found on Fife's genitals and that the marks matched Hill's teeth. An eyewitness, Donald Allgood, testified that he saw both Hill and Combs coming out of the wooded field where Fife's body was found and witnessed Hill tossing "something" into the woods. Detective Sergeant William Carnahan of the Warren Police Department corroborated Allgood's testimony and said that he found a broken stick, allegedly used by the killers to sexually abuse Fife, at the place where Allgood had seen the two men. The pathologist who conducted the autopsy testified that the stick found by Detective Carnahan closely matched the size and shape of the opening in the victim's rectum. He compared the stick's shape to a key fitting into a lock. Three Warren Western Reserve High School students testified that they witnessed Combs and Hill at the area where Fife disappeared; one had seen Combs pulling up the zipper of his blue jeans and another heard a child's scream.

After being on trial for 11 days, Hill was found guilty of kidnapping, rape, aggravated arson, felonious sexual penetration, and aggravated murder. On February 26, 1986, a mitigation hearing was held to determine whether Hill should receive the death penalty, and the panel agreed to issue the death sentence.

On March 5, 1986, the court sentenced Hill to death for the most serious charge of aggravated murder. On top of the death sentence, the court imposed custodial sentences of ten to twenty-five years' imprisonment for both aggravated arson and kidnapping, as well as life imprisonment for both rape and felonious sexual penetration. The judges cited the brutality and cold-blooded nature of the murder as factors that made it appropriate to subject Hill to capital punishment.

=== Trial and conviction of Timothy Combs ===
Timothy A. Combs
- Mug shot of Combs
- Born: December 21, 1967; Ohio, U.S.
- Died: November 9, 2018 (aged 50); Select Specialty Hospital, Franklin County, Ohio, U.S.
- Cause of death: Natural causes (presumed)
- Status: Died in prison
- Convictions: Aggravated murder Aggravated arson Kidnapping; Rape; Felonious sexual penetration
- Penalty: Three consecutive terms of life imprisonment (aggravated murder, felonious sexual penetration and rape); Two consecutive terms of ten to 25 years' imprisonment (aggravated arson and kidnapping)

Details
- Victims: Raymond Fife, 12
- Date: September 10, 1985
- Country: United States
- State: Warren, Ohio
- Imprisoned at: Grafton Correctional Institution

Combs stood trial after Hill, but Combs was tried before a 12-member jury at the Portage County Court of Common Pleas. On May 5, 1986, the jury found Combs guilty on all five counts: kidnapping, rape, aggravated arson, felonious sexual penetration, and aggravated murder.

On May 13, 1986, the court confirmed the jury's verdict. Under the law, Combs was ineligible for the death penalty because he was three months shy of his 18th birthday at the time he committed the murder of Fife; therefore, the only possible sentence for the murder charge was life imprisonment. Judge Joseph Kainrad sentenced Combs to three consecutive life sentences for aggravated murder, rape, and felonious sexual penetration. In addition, sentences of 10 to 25 years were added for the remaining offenses of aggravated arson and kidnapping, respectively.

== Combs's imprisonment and death ==
After his trial and sentencing, Combs was transferred to the Grafton Correctional Institution, where he was incarcerated from 1986 to 2018 while serving his life sentences.

On December 2, 1988, Combs's appeal was rejected by the Ohio Eleventh District Court of Appeals. On August 12, 2005, the same court rejected another appeal from Combs, whose attempt to seek post-conviction DNA testing to overturn his conviction was not accepted, after they found that there would have been sufficient evidence to convict Combs of murdering Raymond Fife in the absence of forensic evidence linking Combs to the murder. On April 19, 2018, Combs's legal motion to vacate his conviction was dismissed by the U.S. District Court for the Northern District of Ohio.

On November 9, 2018, Combs died at the age of 50 at the Select Specialty Hospital. The cause of his death was not immediately known to the public.

== Appeal processes of Hill ==
After he was sentenced to death, Danny Lee Hill was incarcerated on death row at the Chillicothe Correctional Institution in March 1986.

Hill appealed his death sentence and conviction more than 30 times. On more than one occasion, Hill's death sentence was overturned before it was reinstated. In recent years, the major grounds of appeal by Hill was that he was not supposed to be executed due to mental incapacity or intellectual disabilities, which were factors that would prevent a condemned inmate from undergoing execution.

=== 1980s and 1990s ===
On November 27, 1989, Hill's appeal against his conviction was rejected by the Ohio 11th District Court of Appeals. On August 12, 1992, the Supreme Court of Ohio dismissed Hill's appeal against his conviction and sentence.

Hill's second appeal to the 11th District Court of Appeals was rejected on June 20, 1995. On November 28, 1995, the Supreme Court of Ohio rejected Hill's second appeal to overturn his death sentence and murder conviction.

=== 2000s ===
On February 23, 2000, the Ohio Eleventh District Court of Appeals rejected Hill's appeal to vacate his conviction.

On February 15, 2006, Hill was found to be not mentally or intellectually disabled and his appeal was therefore rejected by Visiting Judge Thomas P. Curran.

On July 11, 2008, the Ohio Eleventh District Court of Appeals rejected the appeal of Hill.

=== 2010s ===
On April 17, 2014, Hill appealed to the federal appellate courts to grant him a new trial. On June 26, 2014, Federal Judge John R. Adams ruled that Hill was mentally fit to be executed and upheld the death sentence.

On June 8, 2016, Visiting Judge Patricia A. Cosgrove allowed Hill to petition for a new trial; Hill had questioned the reliability of bite mark evidence used against him in his original trial and therefore asked for a new trial to assess the validity of his conviction, which the prosecution opposed. The petition for a new trial was denied on October 4, 2016.

On February 5, 2018, the 6th Circuit Court of Appeals ruled that Hill should not be executed. The prosecution appealed against this decision to the U.S. Supreme Court, and on January 7, 2019, the U.S. Supreme Court restored the death penalty in Hill's case and sent the case back to the 6th Circuit Court of Appeals for re-hearing. A separate appeal for a new trial in 2018 was rejected on December 4, 2018.

On June 13, 2019, the Ohio Supreme Court again declined to hear another appeal from Hill.

=== 2020s ===
On May 21, 2020, the 6th Circuit Court of Appeals allowed Hill's appeal and overturned Hill's death sentence. The decision, however, was vacated in favor of a rehearing on July 16, 2020.

On August 20, 2021, by a 9-7 vote, the 6th Circuit Court of Appeals upheld the death penalty for Hill and threw out his appeal.

On July 1, 2022, the U.S. Supreme Court rejected Hill's appeal. This was the final regular avenue of appeal in Hill's case and with this outcome, Trumbull County Prosecutor Dennis Watkins applied to the Ohio Supreme Court to schedule an execution date for Hill that same month, and eventually secured a tentative execution date of July 22, 2026.

On November 8, 2023, Hill appealed to the 11th Circuit Court of Appeals to conduct a new hearing to assess whether his execution should be overturned on account of intellectual disability or mental incompetency.

On December 12, 2023, Hill's appeal was allowed by the 11th Circuit Court of Appeals, for which the judges agreed that Hill should not be executed and a new hearing was warranted to determine whether he was mentally incompetent to face the death sentence.

On December 27, 2023, Ohio Assistant Attorney General Stephen Maher filed two separate appeals to the 11th Circuit Court of Appeals, seeking to have Hill executed and to disprove his claims of mental incompetency to face execution.

On May 14, 2024, the U.S. Supreme Court declined to approve Hill's petition for a new hearing to review the bite mark evidence used to convict him of Fife's murder.

On November 26, 2024, the Ohio Supreme Court agreed to hear an appeal filed by Ohio Solicitor General Thomas Elliot Gaiser to review a decision from the 11th District Court of Appeals.

On October 29, 2025, the Ohio Supreme Court heard another appeal from Hill regarding his intellectual disability claims. On April 23, 2026, the Ohio Supreme Court rejected Hill's appeal and ruled that the lower court had erred in allowing Hill to rely on the Ohio Rules of Civil Procedure to appeal his death sentence on the grounds of intellectual disability.

On August 17, 2026, the 11th District Court of Appeals ruled that Hill's sentencing was proper, and rejected his intellectual disability claim.

== Tentative execution date of Hill ==
In July 2022, Trumbull County Prosecutor Dennis Watkins petitioned to the Ohio Supreme Court, seeking an execution date for Hill, whose regular appeals were exhausted before the courts. On September 21, 2022, Hill's death warrant was approved by the Ohio Supreme Court, and his death sentence was scheduled to be carried out on July 22, 2026.

At that time, capital punishment in Ohio was indefinitely suspended, and the state had carried out its last execution in 2018. Governor Mike DeWine had ordered the state to stop conducting executions via lethal injection, the state's sole legal method of execution, and the moratorium on future executions was to remain in effect unless the Ohio General Assembly approved an execution method to replace lethal injection.

On January 30, 2026, it was announced that Hill's execution had been postponed because the state had been unable to find a suitable method of execution. The execution was rescheduled for July 18, 2029.

In April 2026, Attorney General Dave Yost addressed the murder of Fife in the 2025 Capital Crimes report by his office. Yost described the murder and its brutality to be haunting and expressed his disappointment in the lack of efforts to lift the moratorium and resume executions in Ohio. Both Watkins and Fife's 86-year-old mother expressed their gratitude towards Yost for his efforts to maintain capital punishment for Hill and many other inmates on Ohio's death row.

== Aftermath ==
In the aftermath of her son's death, Fife's mother, Miriam Fife, became an advocate for crime victims' rights and later worked for the state prosecution's office. She remained in that role for 25 years before retiring at the age of 74 in 2015. Fife's father, Isaac Fife, died at the age of 79 on September 11, 2006.

Following the death of Combs in 2018, Tribune Chronicle reporters Mike Semple, Burton Cole, and Andy Gray revisited the murder of Raymond Fife and reflected on the case, noting the lasting impact and severity of the crime on their professional careers.

In 2019, Miriam Fife spoke publicly about her son, describing him as a "very ornery child" who enjoyed bowling and baseball and was known for his sense of humor. She stated that her late husband had been unable to witness the execution of their son's killer and that she continued to support the execution of Danny Lee Hill for her son's murder, despite stating that she had long since relinquished feelings of hatred.

== See also ==
- Capital punishment in Ohio
- List of death row inmates in the United States § Ohio
- List of kidnappings (1980–1989)
- List of people scheduled to be executed in the United States
- List of solved missing person cases (1980s)
