= Eugene Blake (serial killer) =

American serial killer

- 1966 mugshot following his arrest for burglary
- Born: February 11, 1945 (age 81); Huntington, West Virginia, U.S.
- Convictions: West Virginia; First degree murder (2 counts); Statutory rape (2 counts); Burglary; Ohio; Aggravated murder
- Penalty: West Virginia; Life imprisonment without parole; commuted to permit parole eligibility (1984); Ohio; 20 years to life in prison

Details
- Victims: 3
- Span of crimes: 1967–1984
- Country: United States
- States: West Virginia; Ohio
- Date apprehended: 1984

Eugene Blake (born February 11, 1945) is an American serial killer who murdered two people in Ohio and West Virginia from 1982 to 1984, shortly after being paroled from a life term for the 1967 murder of a young woman.

Initially linked to only one of these crimes, he was later linked to the 1982 killing and given another life term with parole eligibility, stirring controversy among locals who wished that he remain incarcerated for the rest of his natural life.

== Murders ==
=== Donna Jean Ball ===
On January 16, 1967, 18-year-old Donna Jean Ball, a telephone operator for C&P Telephone, was driving along the West Virginia Route 75 near Ceredo when she was suddenly forced off the road by a man driving a 1958 model Chevrolet. The assailant then stopped his car, approached her and demanded money, and after Ball gave some to him, he proceeded to stab her eight times in the chest and face.

Ball managed to survive the initial attack and ran down the road, where she was spotted by neighbors Kenny Ward and Dallas Campbell, who picked her up and informed the police. The two men then went to her car and attempted to confront her attacker, but he sped away before they could do so. After informing her family of what had happened, they drove to the Cabell Huntington Hospital, where Ball was pronounced dead on arrival.

On the following day, the 21-year-old Blake, a truck driver who had just recently been released on a 1-to-10-year suspended sentence for burglary, was arrested and later charged with Ball's murder. His trial began a year later, with the state presenting strong evidence that implicated him in the seemingly unprovoked attack. Blake was eventually convicted and sentenced to life imprisonment without parole, to which he soon launched an appeal to the Supreme Court of Appeals, arguing that he had not received a fair trial. His appeal was rejected, and he remained incarcerated at the West Virginia Penitentiary in Moundsville.

=== Mark Withers ===
During his time in prison, Blake was described as a model inmate who had managed to gain trust with the guards to the extent that he was eventually allowed to visit the prison warden's house. In 1976, Governor of West Virginia Arch A. Moore Jr. commuted his sentence to life with parole for his good conduct while incarcerated, and in February 1979, Blake was paroled. He moved to Morgantown, where he reportedly violated his parole on at least one occasion but was never arrested. In March 1982, he moved to Wheeling, where he eventually obtained a license to run a local bar despite being a felon.

Approximately one week later after his arrival, on March 19, Blake went to Gould Park in Bridgeport, Ohio, where he came across the car of 21-year-old Mark Withers, who was making out with a 17-year-old girl whose name has not been disclosed. He went up to them, knocked on the window and started screaming at Withers to open the door and give him their money. When he rolled down the window, Blake ended up shooting Withers and later threw his body over a fence, then raped the girl and left. Despite the female victim surviving the ordeal and informing the police, they were unable to arrest a suspect and the case went cold. As part of police procedure, officers obtained semen samples from the attacker after the girl received treatment at a hospital in Martins Ferry.

=== Maryann Helmbright ===
On October 26, 1984, the body of 13-year-old Maryann Hope Helmbright was found in Osage, West Virginia after disappearing three days earlier. She had evidently been raped and shot to death. In June 1985, Blake was indicted for the murder and two counts of statutory rape.

In 1997, he pleaded guilty on all charges relating to the Helmbright murder and was sentenced to a 15-years-to-life term, which he was ordered to serve at the Huttonsville Correctional Center in Huttonsville.

== New charges ==
In 2008, Blake was charged with the Withers murder after his DNA was linked to the crime scene. He was soon extradited to Ohio, where prosecutors sought the death penalty against him for three counts of aggravated murder. In order to avoid a potential death sentence, Blake pleaded guilty to all charges in 2010, and was thus given a 20-year-to-life sentence. As per sentencing guidelines at the time, he is eligible for parole after serving at least 70% of his sentence.

=== Parole applications ===
In May 2022, Blake applied for parole before the Ohio Parole Board, sparking protests from prosecutors and family members of his victims. In response to this, Belmont County Prosecutor Kevin Flanagan wrote a response to the Parole Board, pointing out that Blake committed further violent crimes after his first parole, calling him a "monster".

Blake's bid for parole was eventually rejected, and his next scheduled date is for April 2032.

== See also ==
- List of serial killers in the United States
