= Madison Correctional Institution (Florida) =

State prison for men in Madison, Florida, United States

Coordinates: 30°26′27″N 83°25′16″W

- Interactive map of Madison Correctional Institution
- Location: 382 Southwest MCI Way Madison, Florida
- Status: Operational
- Security class: Minimum, medium, and close
- Capacity: 1,582 = 1,287 (main) + 295 (work camp)
- Population: 1,524 = 1,229 (main) + 295 (work camp) (August 2025)
- Opened: 1989
- Managed by: Florida Department of Corrections
- Warden: David Allen

Madison Correctional Institution (MADCI) is a state prison for men in Madison County, Florida, owned and operated by the Florida Department of Corrections. The facility houses a maximum of 1,582 inmates at a mix of security levels.

== Incidents ==
The death of inmate Justin Campos on October 1, 2013, raised questions about safety in the facility. After Campos was killed by another inmate, officials offered his family contradictory versions of his whereabouts at the time, withheld basic information from his mother, and sent her invoices for more than $4000 for providing heavily redacted public records she requested.

In October 2018, a Madison correctional officer was stabbed multiple times by inmate Ilisiah Williams, who was serving time for second-degree murder.
