= List of people scheduled to be executed in the United States =

As of November 19, 2026, a total of 33 people are scheduled to be executed in the United States. All of these executions are scheduled over five calendar years in three U.S. states and the United States military. Additionally, there are 14 pending requests to set an execution date in six U.S. states. (Note: Of those 14 total pending requests, 1 is in Arizona, 1 is in Louisiana, 2 are in Mississippi, 1 is in Oklahoma, 6 are in Tennessee, and 3 are in Texas.)

== Summary of scheduled executions ==
Year	Executions
2026	3
2027	9
2028	8
2029	10
2030	3
Total	33

State	Executions
Ohio	27
Texas	3
Florida	2
U.S. military	1
Total	33

== List of people scheduled to be executed ==
=== 2026 ===
No.	Scheduled date of execution	Name	Age of person			Gender	Race	State	Method	Ref.
No.	Scheduled date of execution	Name	At execution	At offense	Age difference	Gender	Race	State	Method	Ref.
1	December 1, 2026	Ricardo Maldonado Gonzalez	56	21	35	Male	Hispanic	Florida	Lethal injection	Profile:
2	December 3, 2026	Nidal Malik Hasan	56	39	17	Male	White	U.S. military	Firing squad	
3	December 10, 2026	Willie Seth Crain Jr.	80	52	28	Male	White	Florida	Lethal injection	Profile:

=== 2027 ===
No.	Scheduled date of execution	Name	Age of person			Gender	Race	State	Method	Ref.
No.	Scheduled date of execution	Name	At execution	At offense	Age difference	Gender	Race	State	Method	Ref.
1	April 6, 2027	Carlos Trevino	52	21	31	Male	Hispanic	Texas	Lethal injection	Profile:
2	April 7, 2027	Patrick Henry Murphy Jr.	65	39	26	Male	White	Texas	Lethal injection	Profile:
3	May 3, 2027	Joe Michael Luna	47	25	22	Male	Hispanic	Texas	Lethal injection	Profile:
4	May 19, 2027	John C. Stojetz	71	40	31	Male	White	Ohio	Lethal injection	Profile:
5	June 16, 2027	Archie James Dixon	54	20	34	Male	White	Ohio	Lethal injection	Profile:
6	July 14, 2027	Timothy Lee Hoffner	55	21	34	Male	White	Ohio	Lethal injection	Profile:
7	August 18, 2027	John David Stumpf	66	23	43	Male	White	Ohio	Lethal injection	Profile:
8	October 13, 2027	Lawrence Alfred Landrum	66	23	43	Male	White	Ohio	Lethal injection	Profile:
9	December 15, 2027	Warren Keith Henness	64	28	36	Male	White	Ohio	Lethal injection	Profile:

=== 2028 ===
No.	Scheduled date of execution	Name	Age of person			Gender	Race	State	Method	Ref.
No.	Scheduled date of execution	Name	At execution	At offense	Age difference	Gender	Race	State	Method	Ref.
1	February 16, 2028	Stanley Theodore Adams	61	33	28	Male	White	Ohio	Lethal injection	Profile:
2	March 15, 2028	John E. Drummond	50	25	25	Male	Black	Ohio	Lethal injection	Profile:
3	April 19, 2028	James Galen Hanna	78	48	30	Male	White	Ohio	Lethal injection	Profile:
4	June 21, 2028	Percy Hutton	74	31	43	Male	Black	Ohio	Lethal injection	Profile:
5	August 15, 2028	Douglas Lamont Coley	52	21	31	Male	Black	Ohio	Lethal injection	Profile:
6	September 13, 2028	Timothy L. Coleman	59	26	33	Male	Black	Ohio	Lethal injection	Profile:
7	October 11, 2028	Kareem M. Jackson	54	23	31	Male	Black	Ohio	Lethal injection	Profile:
8	November 15, 2028	Quisi Bryan	58	29	29	Male	Black	Ohio	Lethal injection	Profile:

=== 2029 ===
No.	Scheduled date of execution	Name	Age of person			Gender	Race	State	Method	Ref.
No.	Scheduled date of execution	Name	At execution	At offense	Age difference	Gender	Race	State	Method	Ref.
1	January 9, 2029	Von Clark Davis	82	37	45	Male	Black	Ohio	Lethal injection	Profile:
2	February 15, 2029	Antonio Sanchez Franklin	50	18	32	Male	Black	Ohio	Lethal injection	Profile:
3	March 14, 2029	James Earl Trimble	68	44	24	Male	White	Ohio	Lethal injection	Profile:
4	April 18, 2029	Gerald Robert Hand	80	52	28	Male	White	Ohio	Lethal injection	Profile:
5	June 13, 2029	Cleveland Ramon Jackson	50	23	27	Male	Black	Ohio	Lethal injection	Profile:
6	July 18, 2029	Danny Lee Hill	62	18	44	Male	Black	Ohio	Lethal injection	Profile:
7	August 14, 2029	James Derrick O'Neal	75	39	36	Male	Black	Ohio	Lethal injection	Profile:
8	September 18, 2029	Jerome Henderson	70	26	44	Male	Black	Ohio	Lethal injection	Profile:
9	October 18, 2029	Melvin D. Bonnell Jr.	72	30	42	Male	White	Ohio	Lethal injection	Profile:
10	November 14, 2029	Clarence Fry Jr.	70	45	25	Male	Black	Ohio	Lethal injection	Profile:

=== 2030 ===
No.	Scheduled date of execution	Name	Age of person			Gender	Race	State	Method	Ref.
No.	Scheduled date of execution	Name	At execution	At offense	Age difference	Gender	Race	State	Method	Ref.
1	January 16, 2030	Keith LaMar	60	23	37	Male	Black	Ohio	Lethal injection	Profile:
2	February 13, 2030	Scott A. Group	65	32	33	Male	White	Ohio	Lethal injection	Profile:
3	March 13, 2030	Davel Von Tress Chinn	72	31	41	Male	Black	Ohio	Lethal injection	Profile:

== See also ==
- List of death row inmates in the United States
- List of most recent executions by jurisdiction
- List of people executed in the United States in 2026
- List of death row inmates in the United States who have exhausted their appeals
