= Ohio State Penitentiary =

Supermax prison in Youngstown, Ohio

Coordinates: 41°06′34.85″N 80°34′39.36″W

- Interactive map of Ohio State Penitentiary
- Location: 878 Coitsville-Hubbard Road Youngstown, Ohio, U.S.
- Status: Open
- Security class: Security Level E (highest security designation for Ohio)
- Capacity: 502
- Opened: 1998
- Managed by: Ohio Department of Rehabilitation and Correction

The Ohio State Penitentiary (OSP) is a maximum-security prison in Youngstown, Ohio, United States. It opened in 1998 and is operated by the Ohio Department of Rehabilitation and Correction. It shares its name with the former Ohio Penitentiary in Columbus, which operated from 1834 to 1984.

Ohio State Penitentiary currently holds level E, 4, 3 and 1 inmates. Level 1 inmates are housed outside of the institutional fence in their own building. Inmates placed in restricted housing for disciplinary rules infractions are locked down with the exception of showers, restrooms, and one recreation period of one hour, 5 days per week.

== History ==
The state of Ohio opened the Ohio State Penitentiary as its supermax facility in 1998 after a riot in one of its maximum security prisons. In 2005, the United States Supreme Court heard the case of Wilkinson v. Austin, 545 U.S. 209 (2005), over the procedure for determining which inmates will be placed at the prison. The Court held that Ohio's procedures for determining which prisoners should be placed there satisfied the requirements of the Due Process Clause.

In January 2011, three men on Ohio's death row, Keith LaMar, Jason Robb and Carlos Sanders, held a twelve-day long hunger strike. The reason for the strike was that they were not receiving equal treatment and privileges as the other death row prisoners, which LaMar, Robb and Sanders believed was because they were placed on death row due to their involvement in a 1993 prison riot at the Southern Ohio Correctional Facility. The prisoners drew influence for their strike from the 1981 Irish hunger strike, which lasted for 53 days.

The prisoners' requests were that they wanted more time out of their cells, access to sunlight, access to more food and warm-weather clothing through commissary. They also requested semi-contact visits and access to news and legal databases in order to help their attorneys file appeals to their sentences, all privileges that were accessible to the other death row inmates. Throughout the strike the three men met with the Warden to negotiate a signed agreement to their demands, which they received on January 14, 2011. Robb ended his hunger strike the same day they received the agreement; however, LaMar and Sanders did not end their strike until the following day, when they also received a letter of support for the strike containing 1,200 signatures from around the world.

Formerly, the majority of Ohio's death row inmates were held at OSP. In January 2012, the majority of death row inmates were transferred to the Chillicothe Correctional Institution. OSP does retain death row cells for inmates who are considered the highest security risk. As of 2019, six high security death row inmates remain at OSP, four of whom were involved in the 1993 Lucasville prison riot at the Southern Ohio Correctional Facility.

== Notable inmates ==
Inmate Name	Offender Number	Status	Details
Brian L. Golsby	A743409	Serving a life sentence without parole.	Perpetrator of the 2017 Murder of Reagan Tokes in which Golsby kidnapped and raped an Ohio State University student before killing her.
Thomas M. (T.J.) Lane, III	A640654	Serving three consecutive life sentences without parole.	Perpetrator of the 2012 Chardon High School shooting. Transferred here after escaping from Allen Correctional Institution. Has since been moved to Southern Ohio Correctional Facility.
Casey Pigge	A617546	Serving a life sentence without parole.	Pigge originally killed his ex-girlfriend's mother and burned her apartment with her body in it, but while in prison, Pigge wanted to become the first serial killer inside prison and ultimately killed one inmate while at Lebanon Correctional Institution and choked another one to death while being transported to the Southern Ohio Correctional Facility where he later helped attempt to murder a correctional officer.
