= Ross Correctional Institution =

Prison in Ohio, United States

Coordinates: 39°22′05″N 83°00′06″W

Ross Correctional Institution (RCI)
- Interactive map of Ross Correctional Institution (RCI)
- Location: 16149 State Route 104, Chillicothe, Ohio
- Security class: Close to Maximum; Death Row
- Capacity: 2037
- Opened: 1987
- Managed by: Ohio Department of Rehabilitation and Correction
- Warden: Tim Shoop

Ross Correctional Institution (RCI) is an Ohio Department of Rehabilitation and Correction (ODRC) close security state prison for men located in Union Township, Ross County, Ohio, near Chillicothe, Ohio, adjacent to the medium-security Chillicothe Correctional Institution and the Hopewell Culture National Historical Park. First opened in 1987, Ross houses 2,037 inmates. The institution covers 1,707 acres and employed over 350 security staff. As of January 6, 2016, there are 2085 inmates at the institution. Around 56% of the inmate population are classified as African American, 43% classified as Caucasian, and 0.01% classified as other. As of 2016, ODRC estimates that the daily cost for each inmate is $51.77. In January, 2024, the Ohio Department of Rehabilitation and Correction announced it would be moving men's death row from Chillicothe Correctional Institution to Ross Correctional Institution.

== History ==
On Christmas day 2024, correctional officer Andrew Lansing was killed in the line of duty. The alleged attacker was Rashawn Cannon, an inmate at the prison, who had a long history of disciplinary incidents. At the time, Cannon had been serving an eight year sentence for felonious assault in connection with an attack on a woman he pistol whipped multiple times in 2022. Cannon was moved to the Southern Ohio Correctional Facility in Lucasville, Ohio immediately afterwards and currently resides at the Ohio State Penitentiary in Youngstown, Ohio. In March 2025, Cannon was indicted on aggravated murder charges for Lansing's death. If convicted, Cannon could be sentenced to death under Ohio law designating the crime as a capital crime.

== Staff ==
Gary C. Mohr has been appointed to be director of the Ohio Department of Rehabilitation and Correction From 2011 to 2018. Mohr had past experience in leadership as a corrections officer and a warden, including in Ohio Department of Youth Services and Ross Correctional Institutional.

Roger Wilson is the chief inspector of the Ohio Department of Rehabilitation and Correction. The chief inspector is responsible for maintaining order within the institution by addressing issues with investigation and inspection.

== Composition ==
The prison lies in Union Township.

== Healthcare ==
Ross Correctional Institution provides inmates with primary, secondary, and third level health care. Intensive care is supported by Frazier Health Center and Franklin Medical Center. The Ohio State University Medical Center also works with the institution for emergencies and long term hospitalization. Inmates are charged with a $3 co-pay from their personal accounts.

Telemedicine was introduced to the institution in March 1995, which helped increase communication between primary care physicians and inmates. Over 19,000 consultations have been done through telemedicine.

== Death Row ==
In January 2024, the Ohio Department of Rehabilitation and Correction announced they would be moving death row inmates housed at Chillicothe Correctional Institution to Ross Correctional Institution. As of March 2025, the majority of Ohio's death row inmates reside at Ross Correctional Institution.

=== Current inmates ===
- Richard Beasley, also known as the "Craigslist Killer", a serial killer convicted of murdering three men
- Stanley Theodore Adams, who was sentenced to death for killing a mother-daughter pair, plus 25 years to life for the rape-murder of a woman
- Shawn Grate, who was convicted of killing five women between 2006 and 2016
- Danny Lee Hill, who was convicted of the 1985 rape and murder of Raymond Fife
- Cleveland Jackson and Jeronique Cunningham, a pair of half-brothers convicted of the 2002 Lima, Ohio, apartment shooting
- Michael Madison, a serial killer involved in at least three murders
- Gregory McKnight, a serial killer condemned for a 2002 double murder after his release from a previous 1992 murder conviction
- Austin Myers, convicted of the 2014 murder of Justin Back
- John Stojetz, convicted of the 1996 racially-motivated murder of Damico Watkins

== Inmate programs ==
Community Service

- Crayons to Computers
- Job and Family Services – sewing teddy bears
- Job and Family Services – wrapping holiday presents
- Habitat for Humanity
- Canine for Companies

Academic

- Adult Basic Education
- GED

Vocational

- Carpentry
- Barbering
- Administrative office technology

Religious Services

- Bible Study
- Worship Service
- Jehovah Witness
- Taaleem
- Seventh Day Adventist

== Policies ==
- Prison Rape Elimination
- Prison Sexual Misconduct – Reporting, Response, Investigation and Prevention of Retaliation
- Sexual Abuse Review Team
- PREA Risk Assessment and Accommodation Strategy
- Lesbian, Gay, Bisexual, Transgender and Intersex
