= Belcastro (surname) =

Belcastro is an Italian surname. Notable people with the surname include:

- James Belcastro (1895–1945), American mobster
- Lisa Belcastro (born 1988), American politician
- Luca Belcastro (born 1964), Italian classical composer
- Marie Belcastro (1920–2015), American murder victim
- Pete Belcastro, American television and radio personality
- Sarah-Marie Belcastro (born 1970), American mathematician known for mathematical knitting
