= AOCI =

- Accumulated other comprehensive income
- Allen-Oakwood Correctional Institution, a prison in Ohio
- Anglican Orthodox Church International
- Airports Operators Council International, the American regional office of Airports Council International (ACI).
