= Gunfire locator =

System that detects and conveys the location of gunfire or other weapon fire

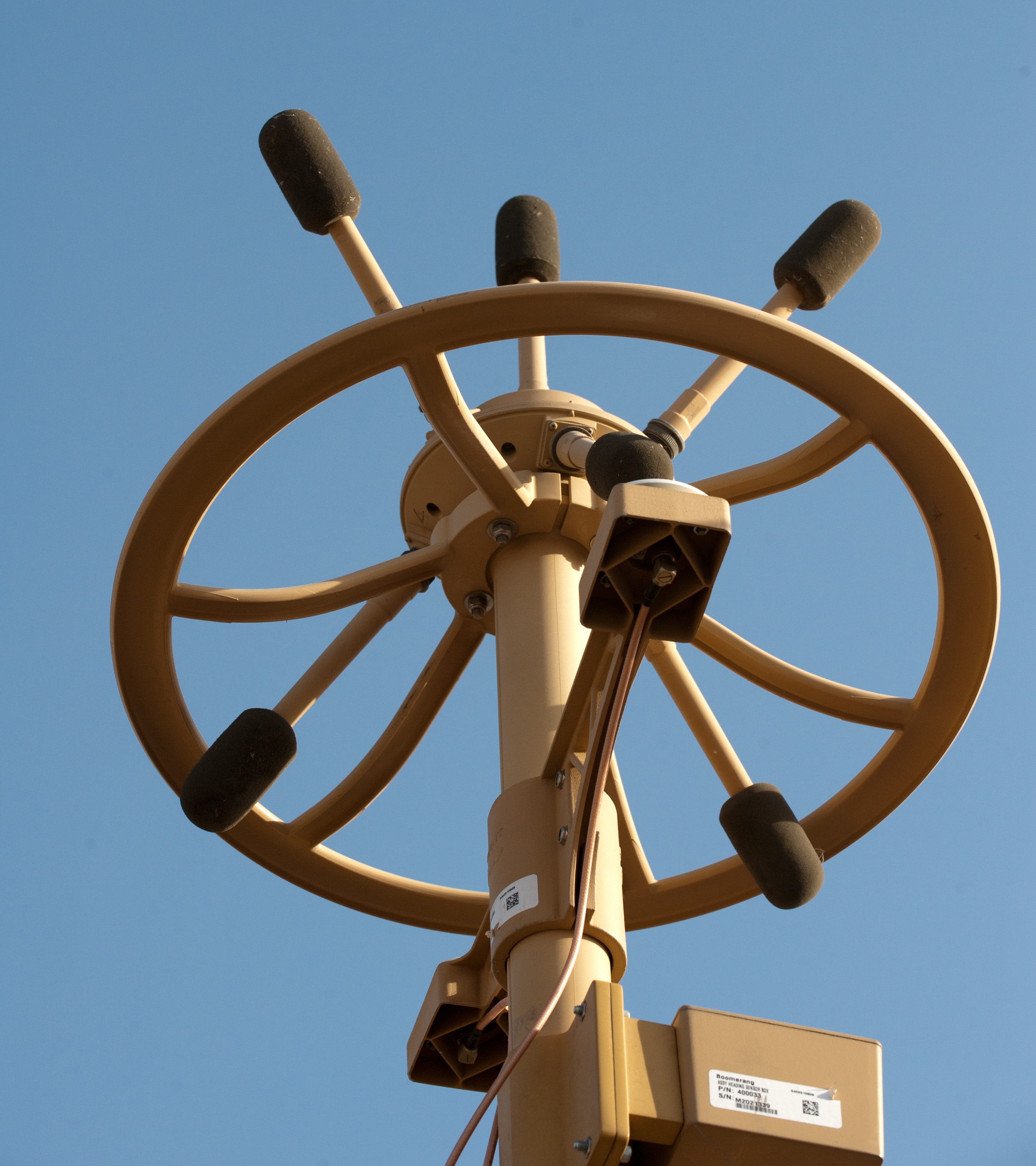
Boomerang, a gunfire locator, being used by British forces in Afghanistan

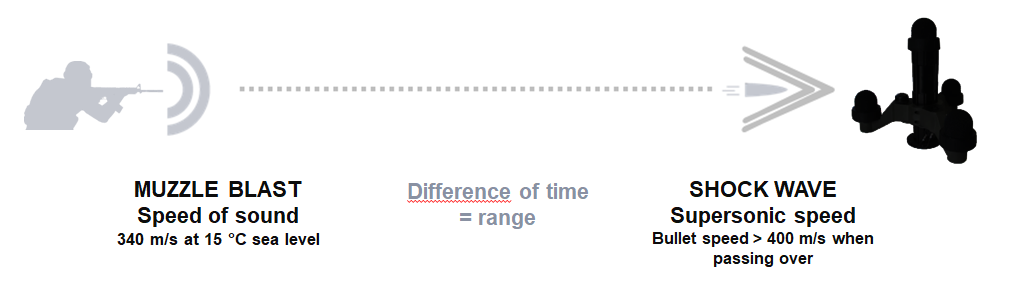
Shooting Detector Diagram

A gunfire locator or gunshot detection system is a system that detects and conveys the location of gunfire or other weapon fire using acoustic, vibration, optical, or potentially other types of sensors, as well as a combination of such sensors. These systems are used by law enforcement, security, military, government offices, schools and businesses to identify the source and, in some cases, the direction of gunfire and/or the type of weapon fired.

Most systems possess three main components:

- An array of microphones or sensors (accelerometers, infrared detectors, etc.), either co-located or geographically dispersed;
- A processing unit;
- A user-interface that displays gunfire alerts.

In general categories, there are environmental packaged systems for primarily outdoor use (both military and civilian/urban) which are high cost and then also lower cost consumer/industrial packaged systems for primarily indoor use. Systems used in urban settings integrate a geographic information system so the display includes a map and address location of each incident. Some indoor gunfire detection systems utilize detailed floor plans with detector location overlay to show shooter locations on an app or web based interface.

== History ==
Determination of the origin of gunfire by sound was conceived before World War I where it was first used operationally (see: Artillery sound ranging).

In 1990, a unique algorithm was used as a starting point : Metravib defence, working with Délégation Générale pour l’Armement (DGA) – the French defence procurement agency – studied the acoustic signature of submarines. The DGA & Section Technique de l’Armée de Terre (STAT), the French Army’s engineering section subsequently commissioned Metravib D. to find a solution for shot detection, a way to assist soldiers and peacekeepers who come under fire from snipers without knowing precisely where the shots were coming from.

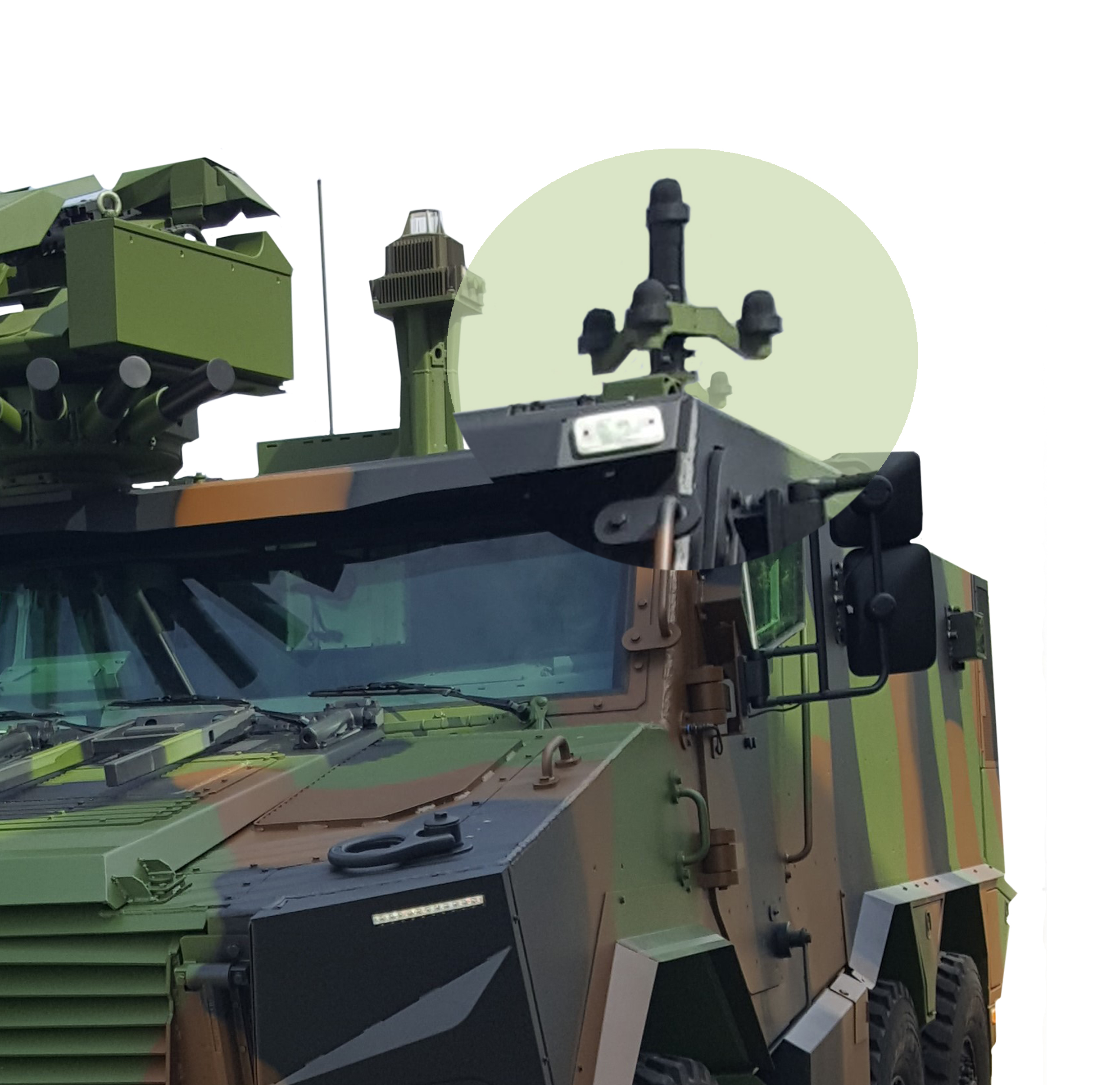
Acoustic Gunshot Detector mounted on vehicle

In the early 1990s, the areas of East Palo Alto and eastern Menlo Park, California, were besieged with crime. During 1992 there were 42 homicides in East Palo Alto, which resulted in East Palo Alto becoming the murder capital of the United States. The Menlo Park police department was often called upon to investigate when residents reported gunshots; however there was no way to determine their source from scattered 911 calls.

In late 1992, John C. Lahr, a PhD seismologist at the nearby United States Geological Survey, approached the Menlo Park police department to ask if they would be interested in applying seismological techniques to locate gunshots. Others had also approached the Menlo Park police department suggesting ways to help the police by means of gunshot location systems. The police chief arranged a meeting with local inventors and entrepreneurs who had expressed an interest in the problem. At that time there were no solutions to tracking gunshots, only a desire to do so. One key attendee was Robert Showen, a Stanford Research Institute employee and expert in acoustics.

Lahr decided to go ahead with his plans to demonstrate the feasibility of locating the gunshots, relying on his background in the earthquake location techniques and monitoring in Alaska. A network consisting of one wired and four radio-telemetered microphones was established, with his home in eastern Menlo Park becoming the command center. Lahr modified the software typically used for locating earthquakes and recorded the data at a higher sample rate than is used for regional seismology. After gunshots were heard, Lahr would determine their location while his wife monitored the police radio for independent confirmation of their source.

Using this system, Lahr was able to demonstrate to the police and others that this technique was highly effective, as the system was able to locate gunshots occurring within the array to within a few tens of meters. Although additional techniques from the seismic world were known that could better automate the system and increase its reliability, those improvements were outside the scope of this feasibility study.

== Gunfire characteristics ==
There are three primary attributes that characterize gunfire and hence enable the detection and location of gunfire and similar weapon discharges:

- An optical flash that occurs when an explosive charge is ignited to propel a projectile from the chamber of the weapon
- A typical muzzle blast generates an impulse sound wave with a sound pressure level (SPL) that ranges from 120 dB to 160 dB
- A shock wave that occurs as a projectile moves through the air at supersonic speed. Note, this does not apply to subsonic ammunition, whose bullet projectiles do not exceed 1120 feet per second (i.e. the speed of sound in air).

Optical flashes can be detected using optical and/or infrared sensing techniques; however there must be a line of sight from the sensor to the weapon, otherwise the flash will not be seen. Indirect flashes that bounce off nearby structures such as walls, trees, and rocks assist in exposing concealed or limited line-of-sight detections between the weapon and the sensor. Because only optical flashes are detected, such systems are typically capable of determining only the bearing of a discharge relative to sensor unless multiple systems triangulate the shot range. Multiple gunshots, fired from multiple locations at nearly the same time, are easily discriminated as separate gunshots because the sensors generally utilize a focal plane array consisting of many sensitive pixels. Each pixel in the entire focal plane (e.g. 640×480 pixels) is constantly evaluated.

The projectile generally must travel within 50 to 100 meters of a sensor in order for the sensor to hear the shockwave. The combination of a muzzle blast and a shockwave provides additional information that can be used along with the physics of acoustics and sound propagation to determine the range of a discharge to the sensor, especially if the round or type of projectile is known. Assault rifles are more commonly used in battle scenarios where it is important for potential targets to be immediately alerted to the position of enemy fire. A system that can hear minute differences in the arrival time of the muzzle blast and also hear a projectile's shockwave "snap" can calculate the origin of the discharge. Multiple gunshots, fired from multiple locations at nearly the same time, such as those found in an ambush, can provide ambiguous signals resulting in location ambiguities.

Gunfire acoustics must be distinguished reliably from noises that can sound similar, such as firework explosions and cars backfiring.

Urban areas typically exhibit diurnal noise patterns where background noise is higher during the daytime and lower at night, where the noise floor directly correlates to urban activity (e.g., automobile traffic, airplane traffic, construction, and so on). During the day, when the noise floor is higher, a typical handgun muzzle blast may propagate as much as a mile. During the night, when the noise floor is lower, a typical handgun muzzle blast may propagate as much as 2 miles. Therefore, a co-located array of microphones or a distributed array of acoustic sensors that hear a muzzle blast at different times can contribute to calculating the location of the origin of the discharge provided that each microphone/sensor can specify to within a millisecond when it detected the impulse. Using this information, it is possible to discriminate between gunfire and normal community noises by placing acoustic sensors at wide distances so that only extremely loud sounds (i.e., gunfire) can reach several sensors.

Infrared detection systems have a similar advantage at night because the sensor does not have to contend with any solar contributions to the background signal. At night, the signature of the gunshot will not be partially hidden within the background of solar infrared contributions. Most flash suppressors are designed to minimize the visible signature of the gunfire. Flash suppressors break up the expanding gases into focused cones, thereby minimizing the blossoming effect of the exploding gasses. These focused cones contain more of the signature in a smaller volume. The added signal strength helps to increase detection range.

Because both the optical flash and muzzle blast are muffled by flash suppressors and muzzle blast suppressors (also known as "silencers"), the efficacy of gunshot detection systems may be reduced for suppressed weapons. The FBI estimates that 1% or fewer of crimes that involve gunfire are committed with suppressed guns.

== Design ==
=== Sensing method ===
Gunshot location systems generally require one or more sensing modalities to detect either the fact that a weapon has been fired or to detect the projectile fired by the weapon. To date, sound, vibration and visual or infrared light have successfully been used as sensing technologies. Both applications can be implemented to detect gunfire under static and dynamic conditions. Most police-related systems can be permanently mounted, mapped and correlated as the sensors remain in place for long periods. Military and SWAT actions, on the other hand, operate in more dynamic environments requiring a fast setup time or a capability to operate while the sensors are on move.

==== Acoustic ====
Acoustic systems "listen" for either the bullet bow shockwave (the sound either of the projectile or bullet as it passes through the air), the sound of the muzzle blast of the weapon when it fires the projectile, or a combination of both.

Due to their ability to sense at great distances, to sense in a non line-of-sight manner, and the relatively low bandwidth required for transmitting sensor telemetry data, systems deployed for law enforcement, public safety and homeland security in the United States have primarily been based on acoustic techniques.

Acoustic-only based systems typically generate their alerts a few seconds slower than optical sensing systems because they rely on the propagation of sound waves. For example, the sound reaching a sensor 1 mile from its origin will take almost 5 seconds. A few seconds to accommodate pickup from distant sensors and to discern the number of rounds fired, often an indicator of incident severity, are both tolerable and a drastic improvement for typical police dispatching scenarios when compared against the several minutes that elapse from when an actual discharge occurs to the cumulative time of several minutes that pass when a person decides to place a 9-1-1 call and that information is captured, processed, and dispatched to patrol officers.

Because such systems have arrays of highly sensitive microphones that are continuously active, there have been concerns over privacy with this broad ability to record conversations without the knowledge of those being recorded (this is "collateral eavesdropping", because capturing conversations is only an inadvertent capability of the system's design, and law enforcement agencies have stated that the recording happens only after shots have been detected.)

==== Optical ====
Optical or electro-optical systems detect either the physical phenomenon of the muzzle flash of a bullet being fired or the heat caused by the friction of the bullet as it moves through the air. Such systems require a line of sight to the area where the weapon is being fired or the projectile while it is in motion. Although a general line of sight to the shot event is required, detections are sometimes available as the infrared flash event bounces off surrounding structures. Just like acoustic-based systems, electro-optical systems can generally be degraded by specialized suppression devices that minimize their sound or optical signatures.

Optical and electro-optical systems have seen success in military environments where immediacy of response is critical and because they generally do not need careful location registration as is generally the case for more permanently installed "civil" crime fighting systems. Just as acoustic systems require more than one microphone to locate gunshots, most electro-optical systems require more than one sensor when covering 360 degrees. Acoustic and optical sensors can be co-located and their data can be fused thereby enabling the gunshot location processing to have a more exact discharge time that can be used to calculate the distance of the discharge to the sensors with the greatest possible precision. Optical systems are (essentially) not limited to the number of individual shots being fired or the number of different shooters shooting simultaneously, allowing optical-based sensing to easily declare and locate shooters conducting ambushes that employ multiple shooters, shooting from multiple locations during the same time period.

The combination of both approaches (acoustic and infrared) assists in overcoming each system's own limitations while improving the overall capability to eliminate false declarations of gunshots and/or ambiguous declaration locations. Even when these combined systems are employed, shots fired from far enough away will not be detected because the amount of gunshot signal (both acoustic and Infrared) eventually fades into the background signals. For acoustic systems that require the supersonic shock wave for location determination, the bullet must still be traveling at supersonic speed when it passes the sensor, and it must pass the sensor within the lateral span of the shock wave. For infrared sensing of the flash upon a weapon's discharge, the bullet path is not determined. Combining these two approaches improves the capability under various conditions anticipated in a combat scenario.

Both optical and acoustic sensors have been used from vehicles while on the move in urban and rural environments. These sensors have been tested on airborne and waterborne platforms as well.

Electro-optical detection systems currently tested (2011) can process the incoming shot signatures at very fast speeds, providing an excellent method not only to discriminate between weapon firings and other non-gunshot events but also to identify categories, characteristics, and sometimes specific weapon types automatically.

=== Discriminating gunfire ===
Many techniques can be used to discriminate gunfire (also referred to as "classifying gunfire") from similar noises such as cars backfiring, fireworks, or the sound of a helicopter passing overhead. Analysis of the spectral content of the sound, its envelope, and other heuristics are also commonly used methods to classify whether loud, sudden sounds are gunfire. Identifying the source of the sounds can be subjective, and companies such as ShotSpotter revise their records based upon information they receive from police agencies, so that a sound originally classified by the automated system as the beat of helicopter rotors has been reported first as three, then four, and finally as the sound of five separate gunshots. As a result, this technology has been rejected in court cases as non-scientific for the purpose of legal evidence. It is meant to be an investigative tool rather than a source of primary legal evidence.

Another method of classifying gunfire uses "temporal pattern recognition," as referred by its developer, that employs artificial neural networks that are trained and then listen for a sound signature in acoustic events. Like other acoustic sensing systems, they are fundamentally based on the physics of acoustics, but they analyze the physical acoustic data using a neural network. Information in the network is coded in terms of variation in the sequence of all-or-none (spike) events, or temporal patterns, transmitted between artificial "neurons". Identifying the nonlinear input/output properties of neurons involved in forming memories for new patterns and developing mathematical models of those nonlinear properties enable the identification of specific types of sounds. These neural networks can then be trained as "recognizers" of a target sound, like a gunshot, even in the presence of high noise.

Regardless of the methods used to isolate gunfire from other impulsive sounds or infrared sensing, standard triangulation methods can be used to locate the source of the gunshot once it has been recognized as a gunshot.

Optical discriminating had previously consisted of methods, among them spatial, spectral, and creative temporal filters, to eliminate solar glint as a false alarm. Earlier sensors could not operate at speeds fast enough to allow for the incorporation of matched temporal filters that now eliminate solar glint as a false alarm contributor.

=== Architectures ===
Different system architectures have different capabilities and are used for specific applications. In general there are 2 architectures: stand-alone systems with local microphone arrays, and distributed sensor arrays ("wide-area acoustic surveillance"). The former are generally used for immediate detection and alerting to a nearby shooter in the vicinity of the system; such uses are typically used to help protect soldiers, military vehicles and craft, and also to protect small open-space areas (e.g., parking lot, park). The latter are used for protecting large areas such as cities, municipalities, critical infrastructure, transportation hubs, and military operating bases.

Most stand-alone systems have been designed for military use where the goal is immediately alerting human targets so they may take evasive and/or neutralization action. Such systems generally consist of a small array of microphones separated by a precise small distance. Each microphone hears the sounds of gunfire at minute differences in time, allowing the system to calculate the range and bearing of the origin of the gunfire relative to the system. Military systems generally rely on both the muzzle blast and projectile shockwave "snap" sounds to validate their classification of gunfire and to calculate the range to the origin.

Distributed sensor arrays have a distinct advantage over stand-alone systems in that they can successfully classify gunfire with and without hearing a projectile "snap" sound, even amid heavy background noise and echoes. Such systems are the accepted norm for urban public safety as they allow law enforcement agencies to hear gunfire discharges across a broad urban landscape of many square miles. In addition to urban cityscapes, the distributed-array approach is intended for area protection applications, such as critical infrastructure, transportation hubs, and campuses.

Using common data-networking methods, alerts of the discharges can be conveyed to dispatch centers, commanders, and field-based personnel, allowing them to make an immediate assessment of severity and initiate appropriate and decisive force response. Some systems have the capability of capturing and conveying audio clips of the discharges with the alert information that provides additional invaluable information regarding the situation and its severity. Similarly for the protection of critical infrastructure, where the information is clearly and unambiguously conveyed in real-time to regional crisis command and control centers, enabling security personnel to cut through often inaccurate and delayed reports so they may react immediately to thwart attacks and minimize subsequent activity.

== Applications ==
Gunshot location systems are used by public safety agencies as well as military/defense agencies. They have been used primarily in dispatch centers for rapid reaction to gunfire incidents. In military/defense, they are variously known as counter-sniper systems, weapons detection and location systems, or other similar terms. Uses include alerting potential human targets to take evasive action, to direct force response to neutralize threats, including automated weapon cuing.

In addition to using gunshot location systems to convey incident alerts, they also can relay their alert data to video surveillance systems in real-time, enabling them to automatically slew cameras to the scene of an incident. Real-time incident location data makes the video surveillance smart; once cameras have slewed to the scene, the information can be viewed to assess the situation and further plan necessary response; the combined audio and video information can be tagged and stored for subsequent use as forensic evidence.

Infrared-based detection systems can detect not only ordnance blast signatures but also large caliber weapons such as mortars, artillery, Rocket-Propelled munitions, machine guns as well as small arms. These systems can also detect bomb impact explosions, thereby locating the impacts of indirect fire weapons like artillery and mortars. The detector can be used as an automated shot correction sensor for close arms support.

=== Public safety ===
In public safety and law enforcement, gunshot location systems are often used in high-crime areas for rapid alerts and awareness into the communications and dispatch center where the alerts are used to direct first responders to the scene of the gunfire, thus increasing arrest rates, improving officer safety, securing witnesses and evidence, and enhancing investigations, as well as in the long run deterring gun crimes, shootings and especially "celebratory gunfire" (the practice of shooting weapons in the air for fun). Gunshot location systems based upon wide-area acoustic surveillance coupled with persistent incident data storage transcends dispatch-only uses because reporting of urban gunfire (via calls to 9-1-1) can be as low as 25%, which means that law enforcement agencies and their crime analysts have incomplete data regarding true activity levels and patterns. With a wide-area acoustic-surveillance-based approach combined with a persistent repository of gunfire activity (i.e., a database), agencies have closer to 100% activity data that can be analyzed for patterns and trends to drive directed patrols and intelligence-led policing. Additional benefits include aiding investigators to find more forensic evidence to solve crimes and provide to prosecutors to strengthen court cases resulting in a higher conviction rate. With the accuracy of a gunshot location system and the ability to geo-reference to a specific street address, versus a dearth of information that typically is the case when citizens report gunfire incidents to 9-1-1, agencies can also infer shooters by comparing with known criminal locations, including those on parole and probation; investigators can also at times infer intended victims and hence predict and prevent reprisals.

Gunshot location systems have been used domestically in urban areas since the mid-1990s by a growing list of cities and municipalities that are embracing gunshot location systems as a mission-essential tool in their arsenal for fighting violent crime. Federal and homeland security agencies too have embraced gunshot location systems and their benefits; notably the FBI successfully used a ShotSpotter gunshot location system during the 2003–2004 Ohio highway sniper attacks, in conjunction with the Franklin County Sheriff.

The technology was tested in Redwood Village, a neighborhood of Redwood City, CA, in April 1996. Through 2007, the manufacturer touted the device as having benefits, but local officials were split as to its effectiveness. It is effective in reducing random gunfire. Surveys conducted for the DOJ showed it was most effective as a "perception" of action.

A ShotSpotter system installed in Washington, DC, has been successfully relied upon to locate gunfire in the area of coverage. The Washington, DC Police Department reported in 2008 that it had helped locate 62 victims of violent crime and aided in 9 arrests. In addition to assaults, the system detected a large amount of "random" gunfire, all totaling 50 gunshots a week in 2007. Based on the system's success, the police department decided to expand the program to cover nearly a quarter of the city.

As of 2016, detection systems were deployed to a number of cities, including Baltimore, Maryland Bellwood, Illinois; Birmingham, Alabama; Boston; Canton, Ohio; Cambridge, Massachusetts; Chicago; Hartford; Kansas City; Los Angeles; Milwaukee; Minneapolis; New Bedford, Massachusetts; Oakland; Omaha; San Francisco; Springfield, Massachusetts; Washington, D.C.; Wilmington, North Carolina; New York City; Integration with cameras that point in the direction of gunfire when detected is also implemented. As of 2014, utility sites in the USA use 110 systems. San Antonio, Texas discontinued its $500,000 ShotSpotter service, after finding it had only resulted in four arrests and seven weapons confiscated in the 15 months it has been in operation.

In August 2017, the United States Secret Service began testing the use of gunshot detection technology to protect the White House and the United States Naval Observatory.

=== Military and defense ===
Determination of the origin of gunfire by sound was conceived before World War I where it was first used operationally. Early sound-based systems were used primarily for large weapons. Weapons detection and location systems and counter-sniper systems have been deployed by the US Department of Defense as well as by the militaries of other countries.

Acoustic threat-detection systems include the Unattended Transient Acoustic MASINT Sensor (UTAMS), Serenity Payload and FireFly, which were developed by the Army Research Laboratory.

=== Wildlife poaching ===
In South Africa's Kruger National Park, gunfire locators are being used to prevent rhino poaching.

== See also ==
- Gun control
- Boomerang (countermeasure) – gunfire locator by BBN and DARPA
- Counter-sniper tactics
- Counter-insurgency
- Gun violence
