= Counter-sniper tactics =

Counteracting a threat from a sniper

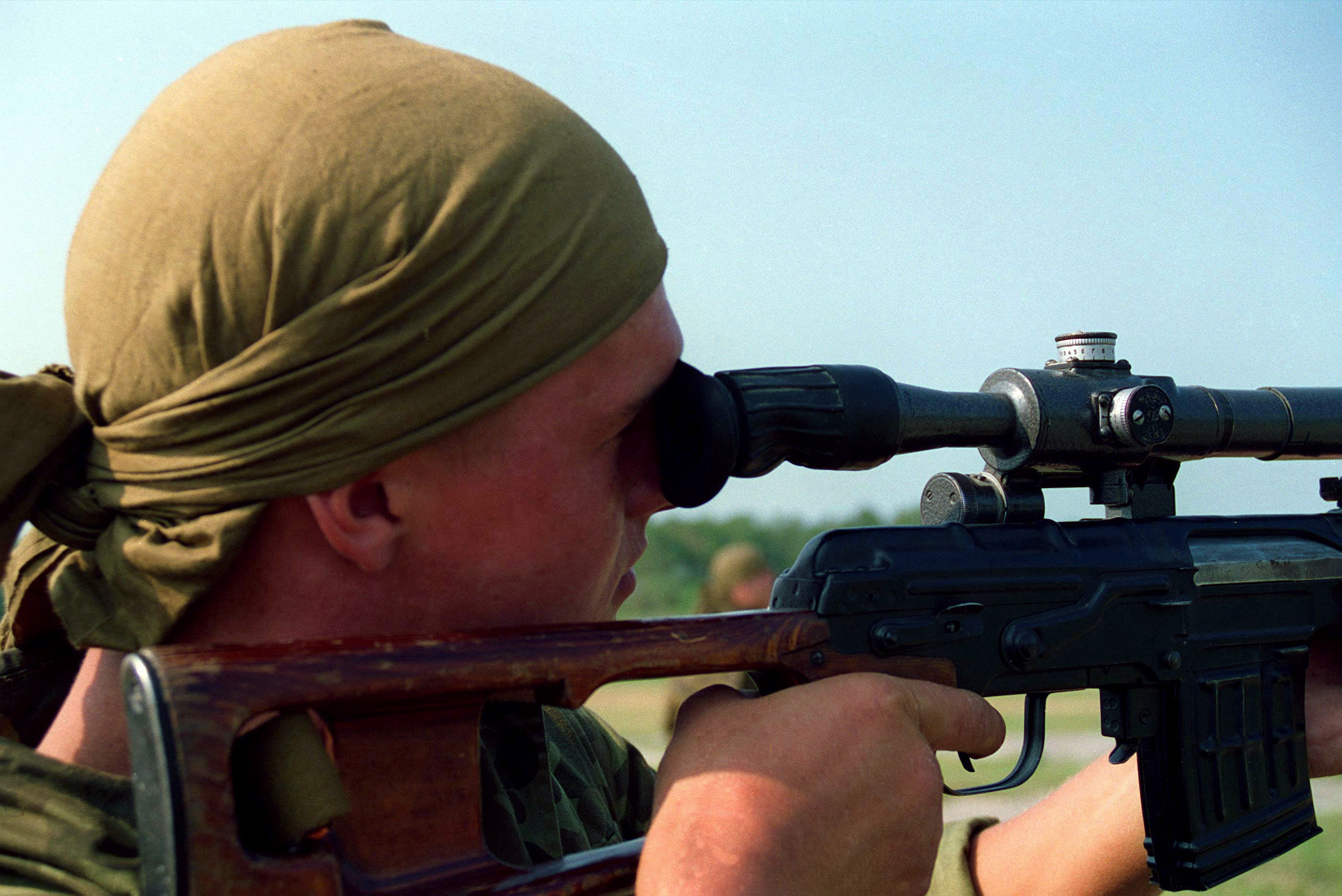
A Kazakh soldier using a sniper rifle in a counter-sniping exercise

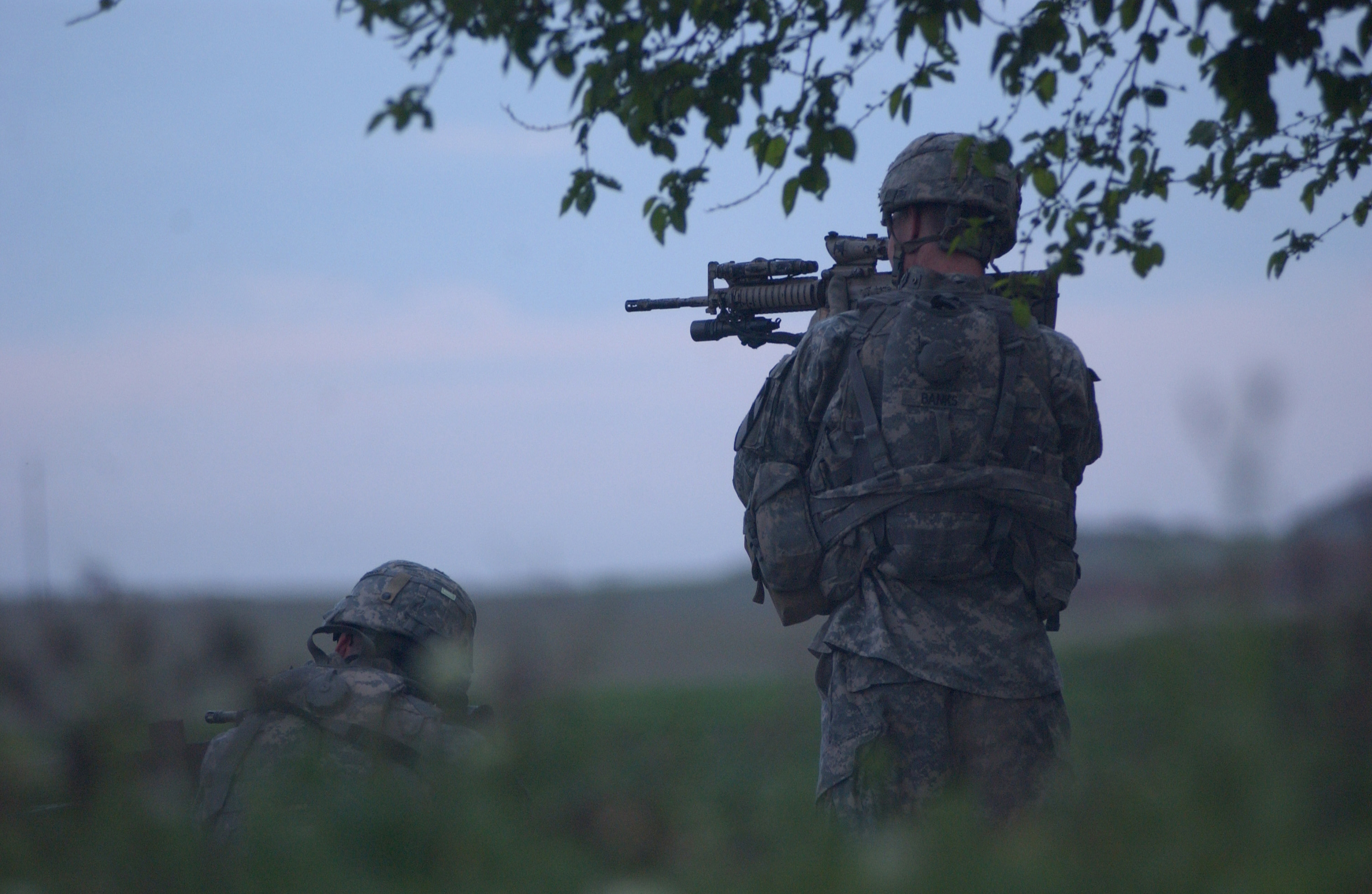
A squad marksman of the 1st Cavalry Division looks for enemy snipers in Nineveh

Counter-sniper tactics are military tactics and countermeasures used to avoid, neutralize, or reduce the effectiveness of hostile snipers.

== Reducing the risk of damage ==
During the stalking phase of their attack, a sniper will, if time allows, try to identify high-value targets, such as other snipers, spotters, heavy weapon operators, medics and engineers, or senior officers and NCOs. They will do this by closely observing the behavior of the people in front of them. The intention is to identify who is in charge and then prepare to fire at them. It naturally follows that leaders should attempt to blend into the background by avoiding anything that distinguishes them from the most junior soldiers and attracts the interest of a sniper.

To reduce a sniper's ability to disrupt the chain of command, doctrine and equipment need to prevent any observable "leadership" behaviors and signs. Identification symbols, e.g. rank insignia, should be subdued (i.e. dark or black as opposed to bright colors), camouflage colors on battledress, battledress identical for all ranks, military servants and rank-based luxuries (like saluting) avoided in forward areas, and commands and instruction should be given discreetly. Other acts such as looking at maps, using a radio, pointing authoritatively, abstaining from menial tasks, and other forms of body language can betray an officer's rank.

== Locating an attacking sniper ==
Because snipers use camouflage, choose their firing positions carefully, and often attack from long distances, they are difficult to locate. Gunfire locators have been developed to do this. These may sense a variety of signatures, including:

- the shock wave from a supersonic bullet
- the muzzle flash and sound
- the heat of the bullet in flight
- reflections from the telescopic sight

When the trajectory of the bullet can be sensed, backtracking can be done to calculate the sniper's location. Sensor techniques are often used in combination to improve detection and eliminate false alarms.

=== Sniper vs. sniper ===
A friendly sniper is generally the most effective counter-sniper tool. With similar training, knowledge of the surroundings, and equipment, the friendly sniper can offer advice to the squad, enhance searching capability, and combat the enemy sniper directly. When told what to watch for, the squad can also act as additional eyes and ears for the friendly sniper. Aside from watching over the squad, the friendly sniper also has the option to detach and engage the enemy sniper. With no outside help from the squad, the respective skills of each sniper play a significant role in determining victory. The enemy sniper's skill can also be determined by the precision of their shots.

- Triangulation: technique at two or more locations can more accurately identify the position of a sniper at the time of firing.
- Sound delay ("crack-bang"): The enemy's supersonic bullets produce a sonic boom, creating a "crack" sound as they pass by. If the enemy's bullet speed is known, their range can be estimated by measuring the delay between the bullet's passing and the sound of the rifle shot, then comparing it to a table of values. This is effective at distances of up to only 450 metres; beyond this, the delay continues to increase, but at a rate too small for humans to distinguish accurately. Also, in urban areas, the sound can give inaccurate results because the buildings in the area can relay false sound directions.
- Detector: A 'sniper detector' system, named Boomerang, was developed through DARPA and can determine the bullet type, trajectory, and point of fire of unknown shooter locations. The system uses microphone sensors to detect both the muzzle blast and the sonic shock wave that emanate from a high-speed bullet. Sensors detect, classify, localize and display the results on a map immediately after the shot. The system sensors are usually mounted on a vehicle. The United States military is also funding a project known as RedOwl, which uses laser and acoustic sensors to determine the exact direction from which a sniper round has been fired. The RedOwl system has been tested on the PackBot robot from iRobot Corporation.

== Counter-attacking the sniper ==
Once a sniper's position is known or suspected, other options follow:

- Fire support: If the sniper's general position can be determined by other means, the area can be bombarded by mortars, artillery, or close air support. Rockets, guided missiles, anti-armor/anti-fortification weapons, and other direct fire options may also be used by the forces in contact as well.
- Smoke screen: In urban settings or other environments with limited movement and fields of view, smoke can be an effective means to screen friendly movement. This can be used either to pass through and escape, or to close in on and eliminate the enemy sniper. Ordinary soldiers can still do damage through smoke by firing randomly or on intuition, but snipers lose their precision advantage and are far less likely to hit anything with their much lower possible shot volume. A determined enemy, such as an emplaced heavy machine gun, will fire randomly through smoke, so this is a dangerous tactic. Weapons of opportunity may also provide a smoke screen, anything from igniting a car's gas tank, oil drum, or using fragmentation grenades to throw up debris and quickly break line of sight and concentration.
- Rush: Also known as "Close With And Destroy." If the squad is pinned down by sniper fire and taking casualties, the order may be given to rush the sniper's position. If the sniper is too far away for a direct rush, a "rush to cover" can also be used. The squad may take casualties, but with many moving targets and a slow-firing rifle, the losses are usually small compared to holding position and being slowly picked off.
- Pincer movement: If the sniper's position is known but direct retaliation is not possible, a pair of squads can move through concealment (preferably cover) and drive the sniper toward the group containing the targets. This decreases the chances that the sniper will find a stealthy, quick escape route. A pincer movement attack can be combined with artillery or mortar fire, so long as this is tightly coordinated, i.e. the target area covered by bombardment does not overlap with the movement of the counter-attacking troops. Even if bombardment does not kill or wound the sniper, it may flush them from cover.
- Basic sniper identification method
1. The defenders monitor the contact. As soon as contact is made, the defenders take cover. If the defenders are dismounted, they make sure cover is the closest and most secure cover possible. If the defenders are mounted, they try to ensure all gunners reduce to "Chin strap defilade" where nothing is showing out of the vehicle but the chin and above. The defenders try to ensure the gunner has proper shielding.
2. The defenders scan the area to locate the sniper's position.
3. The defenders deploy smoke grenades to cover and conceal their position.
4. The defenders designate the element, close in with the element and destroy the enemy.

== See also ==
- Loophole (firearm)

== Bibliography ==
- Plaster, John (1993). The Ultimate Sniper: An Advanced Training Manual for Military & Police Snipers. Paladin. ISBN 0-87364-704-1.
