= 2003 West Virginia sniper attacks =

Sniper attacks in Kanawha County, United States

- Location: Kanawha County, West Virginia, US
- Date: August 10, 2003 – August 14, 2003
- Weapon: .22 WMR Marlin rifle
- Deaths: 3
- Perpetrator: Shawn Lester
- Convictions: Federal; Being a felon in possession of a firearm (18 U.S.C. 922); Being a habitual drug user in possession of a firearm (18 U.S.C. 922); West Virginia; Second degree murder

Between August 10 and 14, 2003, a series of sniper-style shootings took place in Kanawha County, West Virginia, United States. Three people were murdered at various outdoor locations, killed by a single bullet from long distances as they stopped at shops or gas stations.

In July 2012, Shawn Lester, who had been indicted for all three murders in 2011, pleaded guilty to second degree murder in the death of one of the victims. The charges with respect to the other two murders were dropped as part of a plea bargain. He received a prison sentence of 40 years for second-degree murder as well as a consecutive 6-year sentence on federal firearm charges.

The shootings were reminiscent of the D.C. sniper attacks that took place in Maryland, Virginia, and Washington, D.C. in October 2002.

== Shootings ==
On August 10, 2003, Gary Carrier Jr., 44, of South Charleston, was fatally shot in the head while talking on a payphone outside a Charleston GoMart.

On August 14, 2003, Jeanie Patton, 31, was killed at a Speedway filling station around 10:30. She was fatally struck by a bullet to the back of her head as she was about to pay for gas she pumped.

90 minutes after Patton's killing, Okey Meadows Jr., 26, was fatally shot in the neck while purchasing milk at a security window at the GoMart on U.S. Route 60, 10 miles away from Patton. Both Patton and Meadows were residents of Campbells Creek.

== Investigation ==
All three victims were killed late at night by the same kind of small-caliber rifle, although police did not determine whether the same weapon was used to kill all three. Ballistic tests showed that a .22 Magnum Marlin rifle was used to kill the second and third victims. The first bullet could not be completely checked due to damage, but appeared to have similar characteristics to the other two bullets. Police said that they were looking for a dark-colored full-size pickup truck. Eyewitnesses believed the driver was a large white male, but could not identify the suspect further due to the darkness. A man was eventually arrested who matched this profile and who had implied to witnesses he was the sniper, but no charges related to the shootings were ever brought against him.

Police considered the possibility that the shootings were drug-related, as Patton and Meadows had drug connections. However, police were not aware of any drug connections for the first victim.

About five months earlier, while exiting a local Kroger supermarket, Randy Burgess was shot twice in the chest from a long distance and died the next day. Although no hard evidence connected this murder with the three that would follow, investigators did not dismiss the possibility. In October 2003, a joint task force investigating the shootings announced a $50,000 reward for information leading to the killer. This reward would later be increased to $100,000.

A key witness identified a local area resident, Shawn Thomas Lester (born June 2, 1975), as the shooter shortly after the murder. At some time before the three successive murders, the witness's younger brother had stolen an automobile engine belonging to Lester that had a large quantity of methamphetamine hidden inside. Lester later confided in the witness that "he had taken something important to me, so I'll take something important to him", and told him to "keep an eye on the news". Jeanie Patton was the longtime girlfriend of the witness's younger brother.

When the Kanawha County Sheriff's Department failed to act on the witness's information. The witness agreed to be a guest (anonymously) on a local public-access television program titled "West Virginia's Most Wanted". The show aired in January 2007. The show's host, Andrew Palmer, presented a theory that a gang called the "Charleston Five" had carried out the shootings. He suggested that two victims were chosen randomly to throw suspicion off the gang for killing its intended target, Jeanie Patton.

Seven and a half years later, on March 31, 2011, Shawn Lester was arrested and charged with the murder of Jeanie Patton. The property of a woman believed to have sheltered Lester and his gang was excavated to search for the pickup truck used in at least two of the murders and for bodies of possible further victims.

== Conviction ==
Lester was indicted for all three murders in August 2011. At the outset of his trial a year later, he pleaded guilty to the second-degree murder of Jeanie Patton. However, the murder charges with respect to Gary Carrier Jr. and Okey Meadows Jr. were dropped as part of the plea bargain. Lester was sentenced to 40 years in prison. He was later sentenced to an additional 6 years in federal prison after he pleaded guilty to firearms possession charges.

== See also ==
- 2003 Ohio highway sniper attacks
