= 2003 Ohio highway sniper attacks =

Series of shootings in Ohio, US

Charles A. McCoy Jr.
- Born: September 1, 1975 (age 51); United States
- Other name: The Ohio Sniper
- Convictions: Involuntary manslaughter Attempted murder (8 counts); Felonious assault Improperly discharging a firearm
- Penalty: 27 years' imprisonment

Details
- Imprisoned at: Allen Correctional Institution

The Ohio highway sniper attacks were a series of 24 sniper attacks along Interstate 270 and other nearby highways in the central part of the U.S. state of Ohio (mostly around Columbus) against traffic, homes, and a school building in the Hamilton Local School district in Columbus, Ohio. The shootings began in May 2003 and continued for several months. One person was killed (62-year-old Gail Knisley, killed on November 25, 2003), and the shootings caused widespread fear.

== Manhunt ==
Prior to the Knisley killing, local law enforcement was not aware that a sniper had been operating in the area. A number of vehicles had been hit by gunfire, but the reports were taken by different law enforcement agencies which had failed to connect the dots. After the killing, police began investigating in earnest and media attention brought the shootings to the forefront of the public consciousness.

During the investigation, police officials tried to avoid the term “sniper” so as not to draw any connection with the recent DC Sniper attacks, and because the shooter was using a 9mm pistol rather than a scoped rifle. Still, nearly 80,000 vehicles traveled the Columbus outer belt (I-270) every day in 2003, and many frightened commuters changed their routes to spend as little time as possible in the area. Many of the attacks occurred on weekends, so some residents avoided I-270 and the south side of Columbus altogether Thursday through Sunday.

In many cases, McCoy made little effort to even conceal himself while firing at traffic, standing in view and shooting down from bridges and nearby hills. Investigators formed a taskforce that included the Columbus Division of Police, the Franklin County Sheriff’s Office, the FBI, ATF, Ohio State Highway Patrol, and the Ohio Bureau of Criminal Investigation. The taskforce installed shot-spotting sound equipment on overpasses, hoping to respond to any new incidents more quickly, and set up a tip line that ultimately received about 6,000 tips.

On March 11, 2004, the tip line received a call that directed investigators to look at 29 year-old Charles McCoy Jr. of Columbus. The tipster said that members of his family believed that McCoy might be the sniper, and suggested that law enforcement should speak to Charles McCoy Sr. about his son.

Charles McCoy Jr. gave his father permission over the phone to turn his guns over to the police for testing, and then watched from a parked car down the street as investigators interviewed his parents. He then drove 36 hours straight to Las Vegas in his own car, and using his own credit card and name at hotels despite his information being broadcast nationwide as a suspect wanted in the shootings.

== Arrest of McCoy ==
The suspect, Charles A. McCoy Jr., was arrested in Las Vegas on March 17, 2004. McCoy, who had been diagnosed with paranoid schizophrenia in 1996, stood trial in 2005.

Psychiatrists for both the prosecution and defense agreed that McCoy had severe delusions, including that people on television were mocking him. He told them that he had previously thrown wood and bags of concrete mix from overpasses to quiet the voices in his head that called him a wimp, and that he believed that shooting at cars would put an end to news coverage of Michael Jackson.

The first trial with death penalty charges resulted in a hung jury on May 9, 2005, most likely due to McCoy's severe mental illness. Rather than face a retrial, McCoy accepted a plea arrangement where he avoided the death sentence. After pleading guilty to involuntary manslaughter and ten other counts, he was sentenced to 27 years in prison on August 9, 2005. Charles McCoy's prison sentence is expected to end March 10, 2031.

== See also ==
- 2003 West Virginia sniper
- D.C. sniper attacks
- Phoenix freeway shootings
