= Easter Sunday massacre =

1975 mass shooting in Ohio, U.S.

- Location: 39.3678°N 84.5567°W; Hamilton, Ohio, U.S.
- Date: March 30, 1975; 51 years ago
- Attack type: Mass shooting; mass murder; familicide; matricide; fratricide; pedicide
- Weapons: .357 Magnum Ruger Speed-Six revolver; .22-caliber Astra Cadix revolver; .22-caliber High Standard Sentinel Deluxe R-107 revolver; .22-caliber Marlin Model 60 semi-automatic rifle
- Deaths: 11
- Perpetrator: James Urban Ruppert
- Motive: Resentment towards his mother and brother; Psychosis and paranoia; Possible greed and monetary gain (claim by prosecution)
- Charges: Aggravated murder (11 counts)
- Verdict: Guilty on two counts of aggravated murder Not guilty on nine counts of aggravated murder by reason of insanity
- Sentence: Two consecutive life sentences (died before parole opportunity in 2025)

The Easter Sunday massacre was a mass shooting that occurred on Easter Sunday, March 30, 1975, when 41-year-old James U. Ruppert fatally shot eleven members of his own family in his mother's house at 635 Minor Avenue in Hamilton, Ohio.

Ruppert was tried and found guilty on two counts of aggravated murder, but not guilty on the other nine counts by reason of insanity. He received two life sentences, to be served consecutively at Allen Correctional Institution in Lima, and the Southern Ohio Correctional Facility in Lucasville. He was moved to Franklin Medical Center in Columbus in 2019 because of his declining health.

Ruppert died from natural causes on June 4, 2022, while incarcerated at the Franklin Medical Center. He was 88 years old at the time of his death. It is the deadliest mass shooting by a lone gunman in Ohio’s history.

== Background ==
2020 mugshot of Ruppert

James Urban Ruppert (March 29, 1934 – June 4, 2022) was reported to have had a troubled life. His mother, Charity, had told him that she would have preferred to have a daughter as her second child; his father, Leonard, also had a violent temper and held little affection for his two sons. Leonard died in 1946 from tuberculosis at the age of 37, when James and his brother Leonard Jr. were aged 12 and 14 respectively.

Leonard Jr. became the father figure of the family and constantly picked on James during their upbringing, often taunting him. At 16, James was so dissatisfied with his home life that he ran away and attempted to commit suicide by hanging himself with a sheet. He was unsuccessful and returned home.

As an adult, Ruppert was 5 ft 6 in (1.68 m) tall and weighed 135 pounds (61 kg). He was described as a modest, bookish, and helpful man who was unremarkable and quiet; and had no police record.

By 1975, Ruppert was envious of his older brother's successful job and family. Ruppert himself had dropped out of college after two years, then trained as a draftsman, although by 1975, he was unemployed, was unmarried, and was still living at home with his mother. In contrast, his older brother, Leonard Jr., had earned a degree in electrical engineering, had married one of the few girlfriends James had ever had, owned his own home in the city of Fairfield, and had eight children. Charity was frustrated with James' inability to hold a steady job and his constant drinking; she had threatened to evict him from her home on more than one occasion. James also owed his mother and brother money, having lost much of what little cash he had in the 1973–1974 stock market crash.

== Prior events ==
A month before the killings, James inquired about silencers for his weapons while purchasing ammunition. His behavior deteriorated, caused by a deep depression as he neared the breaking point. On March 29, 1975 (his 41st birthday), witnesses had seen him engaging in target practice shooting tin cans with his .22-caliber pistol and rifle along the banks of the Great Miami River in Hamilton.

The night before the murders, James went out as he did nearly every night. At the 19th Hole Cocktail Lounge, he talked with an employee, 28-year-old Wanda Bishop. She would later state that James told her he was frustrated with his mother's demands on him and his impending eviction and that "he needed to solve the problem". According to Bishop, Ruppert stated that his mother had complained that if he could afford to buy beer seven nights a week, he could afford to pay the rent. Ruppert left the bar at 11:00 p.m. that night and later returned. When Bishop asked him if he had solved the problem, he replied, "No, not yet." James stayed at the bar until it closed at 2:30 a.m.

== Shootings ==
On Easter Sunday, March 30, 1975, Ruppert's brother Leonard Jr. and his wife, Alma, brought their eight children ranging in age from 4 to 17 for Easter dinner at their house located at 635 Minor Avenue. Ruppert stayed upstairs, sleeping off a night of drinking, while the other family members participated in an Easter egg hunt on the front lawn.

At around 4:00 p.m., James woke up, loaded a .357 Magnum, two .22 caliber handguns, and a .22 caliber rifle, then went downstairs. Charity was preparing sloppy joes in the kitchen, in the company of Leonard Jr. and Alma. Most of the children were playing in the living room.

He killed Leonard Jr. when he shot him in the head in the kitchen, then he shot his sister-in-law, Alma. Then, as his mother lunged at him, he shot her once in the head and twice in the chest. He then killed David, Teresa, and Carol.

James turned the corner into the living room. One by one, James shot his remaining niece and nephews: Ann, Leonard III, Michael, Thomas, and John. Charity had been shot once in the chest; the remaining victims were shot in the head and shot again, to ensure they had died. The only sign of a struggle at the crime scene was one overturned wastepaper bin.

The Butler County coroner theorized that Ruppert had likely shot some victims more than once to prevent anyone escaping. The massacre was over in less than five minutes.

After spending three hours in the house, James finally called police and said, "There's been a shooting." He then waited just inside the front door for authorities to arrive.

Ruppert fired 44 shots in total, 40 of which struck their targets.

=== Victims ===
- Charity Ruppert, 65, mother
- Leonard Ruppert Jr., 42, brother
- Alma Ruppert, 38, sister-in-law
- Leonard Ruppert III, 17, nephew
- Michael Ruppert, 16, nephew
- Thomas Ruppert, 15, nephew
- Carol Ruppert, 13, niece
- Ann Ruppert, 12, niece
- David Ruppert, 11, nephew
- Teresa Ruppert, 9, niece
- John Ruppert, 4, nephew

== Aftermath ==
The murders shocked the town of Hamilton. Those who knew James did not think he was capable of violence, especially at the magnitude of this particular massacre. By all accounts, neighbors considered the Rupperts a nice family.

James was arrested and charged that day with 11 counts of aggravated homicide. He refused to answer questions asked by the police and was very uncooperative. He made it clear he would plead insanity.

County prosecutor John Holcomb viewed the crime scene and stated that there was so much blood on the first floor, it was dripping through the floorboards into the basement.

At 4:30 a.m., on March 30th 1978, the father of Alma Ruppert, grandfather to 8 of the victims, committed suicide by shooting himself in the head.

== Legal proceedings ==
The original trial was held in Hamilton, Ohio, in June 1975. The three-judge panel found Ruppert guilty on 11 counts of murder and sentenced him to life in prison on July 3. A mistrial was declared because the panel did not know if the ruling had to be unanimous or majority rule. It was decided that the retrial would be held in Findlay, 125 miles (201 km) north, because it was believed he could not receive a fair trial in the city of Hamilton.

The second trial began on July 23, 1975, and prosecutors revealed evidence involving the witnesses who had seen Ruppert engaging in target practice, asking about silencers for his gun collection and admitting that his mother's expectations were a problem that he needed to solve. In July 1975, Ruppert received 11 consecutive life sentences.

On appeal, a new trial was granted in 1982. Defense attorney Hugh D. Holbrock, convinced his client was insane, personally funded the hiring of expert psychiatrists and psychologists from all over the country.

During the second trial, one of the jurors collapsed and died from a heart attack.

On July 23, 1982, another three-judge panel found Ruppert guilty on two counts first degree murder (his mother and brother), but found him not guilty on the other nine counts of murder, by reason of insanity. He received one life sentence for each count, to be served consecutively.

Capital punishment had been suspended in the United States from 1972 to 1976 as a result of the Supreme Court's decision in Furman v. Georgia; the mass murders on Minor Avenue had occurred in 1975 and Ruppert could not receive the death penalty for his crimes.

On July 30, 1982, at the age of 48, Ruppert was incarcerated with the Ohio Department of Rehabilitation and Correction (ODRC), at the Franklin Medical Center in Columbus, Ohio. His assigned inmate number was A169321.

In June 1995, at the age of 61, Ruppert was granted a hearing before the state Parole Board, but his release was denied. He received subsequent parole board hearings in 2005 (age 71) and April 2015 (age 81), both of which he was denied release.

In 2015, the Allen Oakwood Correctional Institution parole board released a statement: "The board has determined that the inmate is not suitable for release at this time. The inmate has not completed any recommended programming and does not appear to be willing to do so. The inmate's record notes negative institutional conduct. The inmate took the lives of multiple victims. There has been strong community objections to his release ... the release of this inmate would not be in the best interest of justice."

Ruppert's next parole consideration hearing was set to occur April 2025 when he would have been 91.

=== Death ===
On June 4, 2022, at the age of 88, Ruppert died from natural causes while incarcerated at the Franklin Medical Center in Columbus, Ohio, a unit of the Ohio Department of Rehabilitation and Correction.

== See also ==
- Russell family shooting, another familicide that occurred fifty years prior also in Hamilton.
