= Lake Academy =

The Lake Academy Alternative School
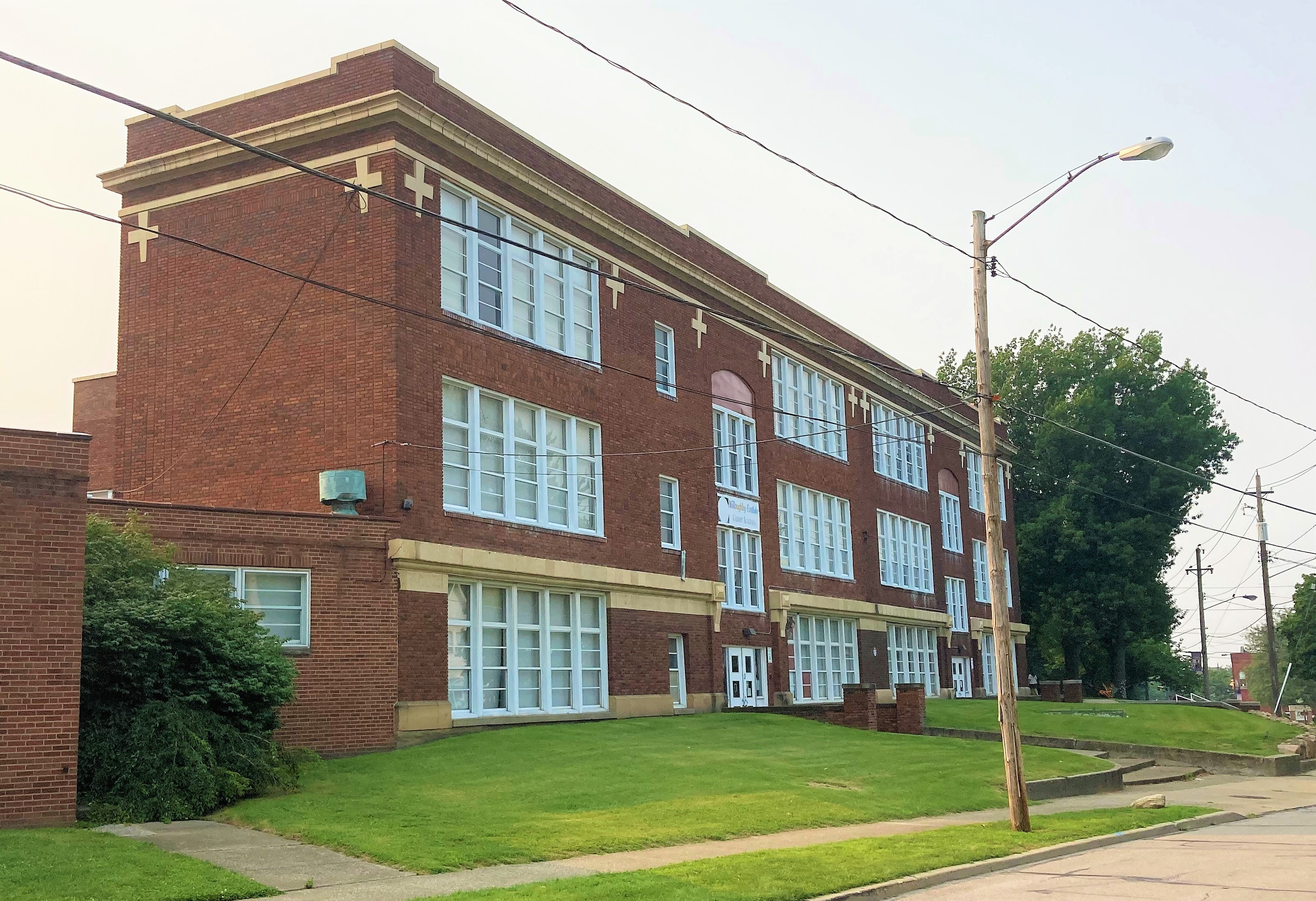

Location
- 25 Public Square; Willoughby, Ohio, 44094; United States
- Coordinates: 41.638°N 81.407°W

Information
- Type: High school
- School district: Multiple; as Lake County Educational Service Center
- Superintendent: Brian Bontempo
- Grades: 7–12
- Enrollment: 60
- Website: Program website

The Lake Academy Alternative School (usually referred to as Lake Academy) was a public alternative high school located in Willoughby, Ohio in Lake County. It was founded in 1997.

== History ==
Classes for students needing help for academic or behavioral issues began in December 1997 at a facility in Painesville, Ohio. Within a year, two facilities were used: one in Grand River on the eastern side of Lake County, and one in Willoughby on the western side of the county. By 1999 the operations merged in one location, at 25 Public Square in Willoughby.

== Description ==
The school educates students in 7th through 12th grades. It serves students in the eight school districts of Lake County (Auburn Joint Vocational School District, Fairport Harbor Exempted Village School District, Kirtland Local School District, Madison Local City School District, Mentor Exempted Village School District, Painesville City Local School District, Riverside Local School District, Perry Local School District, Wickliffe City School District, Willoughby Eastlake City School District) and Chardon School District, which is in Geauga County. Total student enrollment is 60.

The school describes its student population as composed in part of "reluctant learners," who may also be dealing with substance abuse or chemical dependency, mental or emotional health issues, truancy, delinquency, attention or organization difficulties, and/or academic deficiencies.

The school strongly encourages parental involvement with their student's progress.

== Faculty and staff ==
The high school's director is John Weiss. The student-to-teacher ratio is 6 to 1. The faculty had 10 teachers.

== Curriculum ==
Classroom subjects include mathematics, English grammar and literature, and the sciences. Computer science is also taught.

== Notable alumni ==
Thomas M. "T.J." Lane III, a 17-year-old student who pleaded guilty in 2013 to the 2012 Chardon High School shooting, was a sophomore at the time at Lake Academy. Tried as an adult, he was sentenced to three life sentences without parole.
