= Murder of Marie Belcastro =

Murder of a 94-year-old Ohio woman by her neighbor

- Date: March 31, 2015
- Location: Niles, Ohio, U.S.
- Deaths: 1
- Convicted: Jacob Larosa
- Convictions: Aggravated burglary, aggravated robbery, attempted rape, and aggravated murder
- Sentence: Life in prison without parole later reduced by Senate Bill 256 to life in prison with parole eligibility after 25 years

On March 31, 2015, Marie Belcastro, aged 94, was murdered in her Niles, Ohio home by Jacob Larosa, her 15-year-old neighbor. Larosa, who had numerous prior cases in juvenile court, had been released from a juvenile detention facility hours before. He broke into Belcastro’s residence, and, using a MAG flashlight, beat her to death. Larosa also attempted to rape Belcastro. In 2018, Larosa pleaded no contest to charges of aggravated burglary, aggravated robbery, attempted rape, and aggravated murder. Later that year, he was sentenced to life in prison without the possibility of parole. In 2021, a new Ohio law, Senate Bill 256, retroactively reduced his sentence, making him eligible for parole after 25 years. The change to Larosa’s sentence has led to controversy and calls for changes to Senate Bill 256. As of 2022, Larosa’s parole hearing is scheduled for 2040.

== Background ==
=== Marie Belcastro ===
Marie Rose Belcastro
- Born: September 9, 1920
- Died: March 31, 2015 (aged 94); Niles, Ohio, U.S.
- Cause of death: Murder with MAG flashlight
- Education: Niles McKinley High School

Marie Rose Belcastro (nee Conti) was born on September 9, 1920, in Niles, Ohio. She graduated from Niles McKinley High School in 1939 and married her husband Fred on May 10, 1941. Belcastro worked at Packard Electric during World War II, and as a Trumbull County School Bus driver and aide. She had two daughters and several grandchildren and great-grandchildren and had lived alone since her husband's death in 1989. Belcastro enjoyed house plants, playing cards, fly fishing, spending time with her grandchildren and great-grandchildren, and traveling with her daughters.

At the time of her death, Belcastro was approximately ~4 ft 8 in (1.42 m) tall and weighed around 80–85 lb (36–39 kg).

=== Jacob Larosa ===
Jacob Larosa was born on July 27, 1999. He was diagnosed with low-average to below-average intelligence, as well as attention deficit disorder, and was identified as having bipolar with cannabis dependence. He did not have a good relationship with his birth father and had a strained relationship with his stepfather.

Prior to murdering Belcastro, Larosa had a history of behavior problems and dealings with the Trumbull County Juvenile Court. Complaints against him had been filed on several occasions. In one instance, he threw a mason jar candle at his seven-year-old sister. The jar struck the girl’s eye, requiring 18 stitches. Before the murder of Belcastro, Larosa had stayed in juvenile detention on five occasions. He also had stayed at multiple facilities aimed at treating addiction and substance abuse, though none proved successful for him. While at one such facility, he committed multiple infractions. These included: threatening violence against another resident; masturbating and not cleaning up after himself; punching another youth in the jaw, and using another youth’s computer to send sexually explicit emails to a teacher. Additionally, he was found with a school computer in his room and admitted that he liked to look at women while masturbating. Larosa’s behavior was so deviant, that his parents locked the doors within their house at night to keep him from stealing from family members and his stepfather began sleeping with a gun under his pillow due to concerns about his violent tendencies.

Larosa’s residence was directly across Belcastro’s, separated by an alleyway. Before her death, Belcastro knew Larosa and had reportedly always been kind to him.

== Murder ==
On the morning of March 31, 2015, Larosa was released from the Juvenile Justice Center after being detained for a probation violation. Shortly after 5:00 pm, he broke into Belcastro’s home and murdered her.

There were effectively three separate and distinct crime scenes in Belcastro’s home. In the living room, Larosa grabbed a MAG flashlight and struck Belcastro. He then dragged her to the dining room area, where he continued to beat her and rifled through her purse, emptying its contents onto the floor. Next, Larosa dragged Belcastro to a bedroom, placed her onto the bed, and attempted to rape her bleeding, battered, yet still-alive body. Belcastro ultimately died of blunt craniocerebral trauma.

At some point during the crimes, Larosa entered Belcastro’s basement and stole items, including alcohol. There is no known motive for Larosa’s murder of Belcastro. Larosa would later brag to other inmates at the Juvenile Justice Center that he wanted to “hide her body and save her for later” and that he “saw her brains”.

An autopsy would later reveal the extent of Belcastro’s injuries. She was beaten so severely, that the coroner could not even make a determination as to how many times Larosa had struck her in the head. Bones in Belcastro’s face and the top of her skull were not merely broken, but crushed. Additionally, Belcastro’s eyes had ruptured inside her head and a fragmented hearing aid was compacted into one of her ear canals. Parts of her brain were visible through her crushed skull.

== Investigation and criminal proceedings ==
=== Investigation and charges ===
After murdering Belcastro, Larosa arrived at his home with blood on his shirt, shoes, and glasses. He was in a nearly incoherent state and told multiple family members that he had been attacked by other juveniles. These other juveniles, he claimed, had forced him to consume alcohol and other substances at gunpoint. Larosa’s mother called for help and Niles Police Officer Todd Mobley and EMT personnel arrived to assist them. Larosa wore only socks and underwear, and repeatedly made statements such as “they’re going to kill me for this.” As Larosa was being placed into an ambulance, Officer Mobley was alerted to the commotion at Belcastro’s residence. Belcastro’s daughter waved down the paramedics at Larosa’s home after discovering a break-in through the side door of Belcastro's residence. Officer Mobley and Belcastro’s daughter would then discover Belcastro’s deceased body.

There was a blood trail throughout Belcastro’s house from the living room through the hallway. A massive amount of blood was found in Belcastro’s living room, on her couch and floor, and sprayed on the walls and on a lamp. On the living room floor were Belcastro’s sweatpants and undergarments. The hallway between the living room and bedroom also contained a large amount of blood, as well as a broken hearing aid and a piece of Belcastro’s skull. Belcastro’s brain matter was also visible on the floor and was sprayed across the wall.

Officer Mobley and Belcastro’s daughter found her deceased, severely beaten body on the floor in the bedroom. She was naked from the waist down and twisted awkwardly into a fetal position.

Meanwhile, Larosa was taken to St. Joseph Hospital. There, his blood-alcohol level was found to be almost three times the legal limit for an adult. He had no discernible injuries to explain the blood on him. At the hospital, police seized Larosa’s socks and underwear, which had Belcastro’s blood on them. They also seized a washcloth used by hospital staff to wash his groin area. This washcloth also contained Belcastro’s blood, as did Larosa’s shirt and shoes. Additionally, swabs done on Larosa's penis yielded Belcastro's DNA.

Larosa was charged with the aggravated burglary, aggravated robbery, attempted rape, and aggravated murder of Marie Belcastro. In November 2015, Family Court Judge Sandra Stabile Harwood granted the state’s motion to transfer him to adult court, where Judge W. Wyatt McKay presided over his case. On December 16, Larosa was indicted by a grand jury on charges of aggravated murder, aggravated burglary, aggravated robbery, and attempted rape.

=== No contest plea and sentencing ===
The case moved towards trial. Voir dire began on February 12, 2018, but ceased after Larosa pleaded no contest to all charges on February 13, 2018.

After Larosa’s no contest plea, Judge W. Wyatt McKay was tasked with sentencing him. Prosecutors asked him to give Larosa the maximum sentence possible—life in prison without the possibility of parole. In court documents, prosecutors said Larosa’s crimes were “straight out of a slasher film” and that it was evident he had no motive other than “murder and mayhem for the sake of murder and mayhem.” Defense attorneys argued that he should receive life in prison with the possibility of parole after 20 years. Defense attorneys asked the judge to give Larosa "an opportunity to earn a release some day. If he does not take advantage of that opportunity, he will ultimately serve the balance of his life in prison because he will never be released."

When determining a sentence, Judge McKay reviewed: extensive psychological assessments and medical information provided for Larosa; Larosa’s allocution statement; the Miller factors for sentencing juveniles; a presentence report from the Department of Adult Probation, which stated that Larosa had struggled to express true remorse and had repeatedly bragged about his crimes to other inmates while in Juvenile Justice Center and contained an Ohio Risk Assessment System rating of "very high" with regard to his recidivism risk; the transcript of the juvenile amenability hearing; victim impact statements; and other material. In October 2018, three and a half years after the murder of Belcastro, Larosa was sentenced by Judge McKay. For the aggravated murder of Belcastro, Judge McKay selected a sentence of life imprisonment without the possibility of parole. Judge McKay also sentenced Larosa to 11 years for aggravated burglary, 11 years for aggravated robbery, and eight years for attempted rape.

In his sentencing judgment, Judge McKay wrote that Larosa “murdered a frail 94-year-old woman who was known to be kind to him.” He further wrote that “There was no known motive for the crime” and that Larosa “brutally beat the victim repeatedly with a MAG flashlight.” During the sentencing hearing, Judge McKay explained his effort to balance Larosa’s age and possible mental deficits to the severity of his crimes. He also said that there was evidence Larosa would likely commit future crimes if ever released from prison. After Larosa was sentenced, Trumbull County First Assistant Prosecutor Chris Becker stated: “There’s no question that if he had been over 18 he would have gotten from any jury the death penalty.” Becker also said, “We couldn’t give him the death penalty, but Judge McKay thoughtfully, carefully and professionally examined all of the factors and gave the only sentence that he could make.” Additionally, Larosa was classified as a Tier 3 sex offender.

In 2021, Larosa’s sentence was reduced by Ohio Senate Bill 256, which grants parole eligibility to inmates serving time for crimes committed as minors. Specifically, it sets parole eligibility at 18 years for juvenile non-homicide offenders and at 25 or 30 years for juvenile homicide offenders. It also bans life without parole sentences for juvenile offenders, except those who murder three or more people. The provision allowing life without parole for juveniles who commit three or more murders was added to prevent the bill from making T.J. Lane, the perpetrator of the 2012 Chardon High School shooting, eligible for parole. Under the new law, Larosa will be eligible for parole after 25 years.

After the enactment of Senate Bill 256, Trumbull County Prosecutor Dennis Watkins stated: “This office will continue to vigorously oppose Jacob LaRosa’s release and take all necessary steps, including any potential appeals if warranted, to ensure Jacob LaRosa serves the maximum sentence permissible.” He also said that Senate Bill 256 “nullifies the hard work and judgments of judges throughout the state who have previously, in their discretion and after careful consideration of the facts and background of juvenile offenders such as LaRosa, determined that life without parole sentences were necessary to protect the public from these offenders.” Belcastro’s family also opposes the change. Her grandson Brian Kirk stated “God can and does forgive. I can forgive. But this wonderful fact does not absolve LaRosa of the consequences for his actions. Only God (and S.B. 256 apparently) can do that.” In the summer of 2021, Kirk and other family members held several protests around the state expressing opposition to Senate Bill 256.

Larosa is currently incarcerated at the Allen-Oakwood Correctional Institution in Lima, Ohio. His first parole hearing will be in February of 2040.

=== Appeals ===
Before his no contest plea, Larosa had filed a motion to suppress the evidence from his hospital room, which included his socks and underwear, the washcloth used to clean his groin area, and his fingernail scrapings. After a hearing, the trial court had denied the motion to suppress the evidence, finding that the fingernail scrapings fell within the scope of the search warrant and that Larosa had no expectation of privacy in regards to the clothing items, which were removed from him when he voluntarily presented himself for treatment while claiming to be a victim. The court also ruled that Larosa had no expectation of privacy in regard to the hospital-owned washcloth and no expectation of privacy in someone else’s blood.

Larosa appealed to the Eleventh District Court of Appeals, arguing that the trial court had failed to prohibit items seized by the police from his hospital room, in violation of his Fourth Amendment and Fourteenth Amendment rights under the U.S. Constitution, and his rights under Article I, Section 14 of the Ohio Constitution. In 2020, the appeals court unanimously affirmed Larosa’s conviction and sentence. Because Larosa’s socks, underwear, and the washcloth were seized by a private person (a nurse) and not by a police officer, there was no governmental action. They further ruled that because Larosa had come to the hospital claiming to be a victim, he had no reasonable expectation of privacy. Additionally, Larosa had no expectation of privacy in regards to the washcloth, which was the hospital's property. Finally, the appeals court agreed with the trial court’s decision not to suppress fingernail scrapings.

Larosa then appealed to the Supreme Court of Ohio, which upheld his convictions in November 2021. The Court ruled that the trial court erred in admitting the socks and underwear, but did not err in admitting the washcloth because it was the hospital’s property, not Larosa’s. The Court further ruled that the trial court’s failure to suppress the socks and underwear was “harmless” and did not impact the case or Larosa’s decision to plead no contest.
