= Anthony and Nathaniel Cook =

American criminal brothers

Anthony Cook
- ODRC Mugshot
- Born: Anthony H. Cook; March 9, 1949 (age 77); Mobile, Alabama, U.S.
- Status: Incarcerated
- Convictions: Aggravated murder (2 counts); Murder; Attempted murder Attempted rape Aggravated robbery
- Penalty: 15 years to life

Details
- Victims: 9+
- Span of crimes: 1973–1981
- Country: United States
- State: Ohio
- Date apprehended: October 14, 1981
- Imprisoned at: Chillicothe Correctional Institution, Union Township, Ross County, Ohio

Nathaniel Cook
- ODRC Mugshot
- Born: October 25, 1958 (age 67); Mobile, Alabama, U.S.
- Status: Released
- Convictions: Attempted aggravated murder Kidnapping (2 counts)
- Penalty: 15–75 years

Details
- Victims: 3–9+
- Span of crimes: 1980–1981
- Country: United States
- State: Ohio
- Date apprehended: February 13, 1998
- Imprisoned at: Allen-Oakwood Correctional Institution, Lima, Ohio

Anthony Cook (born March 9, 1949) and Nathaniel Cook (born October 25, 1958) are American brothers and serial killers who murdered at least nine people in northwestern Ohio between 1973 and 1981, primarily in Toledo. Anthony was arrested and convicted for the final murder, but his and Nathaniel's guilt in the other killings would not be uncovered until he was detained for a misdemeanor in 1998, after which DNA profiling exposed their involvement. Both brothers were later convicted and sentenced to long terms of imprisonment; Anthony received multiple life sentences, while Nathaniel was sentenced to 75 years with a minimum of fifteen years served, and he was paroled after eighteen years in 2018.

== Early life ==
Anthony Cook was born in Mobile, Alabama, on March 9, 1949, as the third child to Hayes and Marjorie (née Bonds) Cook. The year after his birth, the family moved to Ohio and produced six further children, including Nathaniel, who was born on October 25, 1958. Hayes and Marjorie divorced in 1959 and she struggled to financially support her children with her job as a hairdresser. Her older children found part-time jobs to maintain a stable income; Anthony made money repairing household appliances and cars for family members and neighbors.

Anthony attended a Northern Toledo boys-only school for academically challenged students, where he received only mediocre grades. In his adolescence, he garnered a reputation as a delinquent for purse-snatching, drag racing, and groping a neighborhood girl. In 1965, his older brother, Hayes III, was convicted of rape and sentenced to 7-to-25 years imprisonment, and around this time Anthony shot himself in the chest but recovered. In 1968, he was arrested for robbing a pedestrian of $100 and a $10 check. He was admitted to a mental hospital where he was diagnosed with schizophrenia. Just eight days after his release, he was arrested again for assaulting and robbing a 61-year-old woman of $250, and he was sentenced to 10-to-20 years imprisonment.

Nathaniel grew up with Anthony mostly absent from his life. He mentored his younger sisters after the family relocated to Southern California in the early 1970s. Three years later they moved back to Ohio and initially settled in Dayton before moving to Columbus. Nathaniel was described as a loner who made few friends while a student at Linden-McKinley High School and eventually dropped out. He expressed interest in joining the United States Air Force but never enlisted.

== Early adulthood ==
=== First murder ===
In mid-1973, Anthony was paroled. On December 20, during a snowstorm in Toledo, he cruised around the city looking for someone to abduct. At around 1:40 a.m. he offered a ride to 21-year-old Vicki Lynn Small, a University of Toledo graduate and karate enthusiast, who accepted his offer. Small asked Anthony to drive her to her apartment that was only one block away, but he drove to Ottawa Park in central Toledo, where he raped, beat, and fatally shot her six times with a .25 caliber pistol. He left her body behind a golf club unit at Bancroft Street and Parkside Boulevard.

Her body was discovered about four hours later. During the initial investigation, police did not impound Small's vehicle for several weeks and did not seal the premises of her apartment, meaning during that time anyone, including possibly the murderer, had access to it for at least a week. Small's father told the Toledo City Council he was upset with authorities for mishandling the case and demanded further action. As many as 100 persons of interest were looked into during the following weeks and several firearms were seized and compared to the bullets found near Small's body, but no arrests were made.

=== Acquaintance ===
In 1974, Anthony robbed two people at gunpoint in Toledo, a crime for which he returned to prison for five years. After his parole in 1979, he found a job hauling scrap metal and married a young elementary school teacher. Around this time, Nathaniel reached out to Anthony and the two began spending time together. Prior to this, Nathaniel's only run-ins with police were being issued traffic tickets.

== Murder series ==
The killings began in May 1980, when the brothers attacked 24-year-old Thomas Gordon and his 18-year-old girlfriend in north Toledo. They threatened the couple with guns, seized control of their car and held them hostage. The Cooks drove the couple to the woodlands in western Lucas County, where they shot Gordon. The brothers then raped the woman, after which they stabbed her and fled the crime scene. The girl survived, but Gordon died.

On January 3, 1981, Anthony and Nathaniel picked up a 19-year-old hitchhiker and Michigan-native named Connie Sue Thompson. They drove Thompson out to western Lucas County, where they raped and subsequently killed her. The Cooks threw her body off a bridge into a culvert where it was discovered on January 17.

In February 1981, Anthony lured 12-year-old Dawn Rene Backes into his car. Nathaniel soon joined his brother. The two men took Backes to the abandoned State Theater on Collingwood Boulevard, where they raped and tortured the young girl for the next several hours. The brothers ultimately killed Backes, crushing her skull by hitting her several times on the head with a brick block.

On March 27, Anthony attacked Scott Moulton and Denise Siotkowski, both 21, near a supermarket located in the city center. He took them to Oregon, Ohio, an eastern suburb, where he shot both after raping Siotkowski. In this instance, he acted without help from his younger brother.

On Sunday August 2, 1981 after 2am, Anthony, again acting alone, attacked Daryl Cole and Stacy Lynn Balonek, both 21. The couple were returning from a night out with Stacy's brother and his wife. After raping Balonek, Cook used a baseball bat he had found in her car to beat Cole, inflicting fatal brain injuries. He then killed Balonek in the same manner. Anthony hid both bodies in the trunk of the car.

In September of that year, Anthony committed a crime in the western part of the city, just two blocks away from the Ottawa Hills police station. Early in the morning, Cook confronted the passengers of a parked van, 21-year-old Todd Sabo and 20-year-old Leslie Sawicki. He tried to rape Sawicki, but she escaped and ran to call police. Although the attempted rape took place only two blocks from the Ottawa Hills police station, the call had to be routed through Toledo. Sawicki then called her father Peter, a well-known businessman and developer in Toledo, for help. Peter Sawicki arrived before police and was fatally shot by Anthony.

Cook's fingerprints were found at the crime scene. Street informants told about him, and soon after, authorities found and arrested Anthony on October 14, 1981.

== Exposure ==
No evidence was found that could incriminate Anthony Cook in other murders, and so, in 1982, he was found guilty of killing Peter Sawicki and sentenced to life imprisonment. After his brother's conviction, Nathaniel decided to cease his criminal lifestyle, and in the following years was arrested only for minor offences. In the mid-1990s, during one of these arrests, a blood sample was taken from him. Since both brothers left biological traces while committing the crimes, in 1998, DNA testing of the samples was carried out, which showed correspondence between the killers' profiles and that of the brothers. On February 13, 1998, Nathaniel was arrested and charged with the murder of Thomas Gordon and the attempted murder of his girlfriend.

In 2000, the brothers accepted a plea bargain, pleading guilty to the murder of Gordon and describing in detail the other murders, in exchange that they wouldn't be charged with them. Ultimately, Nathaniel pleaded guilty to killing Thomas Gordon and to being complicit in the murders of Dawn Backes and Connie Thompson. Anthony pleaded guilty to eight murders, in addition to confessing to the 1973 murder of Vickie Small, which had never been considered connected to the Toledo series. As was the deal, Anthony received a second life imprisonment term in April 2000, while his brother Nathaniel received a sentence of 75 years in prison, with the possibility of parole after 20 years.

Retired Toledo Police Department Detective Tom Ross said he believed the murders were racially motivated, adding that several of the victims were stalked. All of the victims were white, and the Cook brothers are black.

== Aftermath ==
After spending 34 years behind bars, Anthony Cook filed a motion for parole in 2015, but was denied and forbidden to file another one until 2025. Nathaniel, having served 20 years, also filed a parole application in 2018. Despite protests from the victims' relatives, the court, given the terms of agreement and the deal with the judge made in 2000, found no legal basis to prevent his release and granted the request.

Nathaniel Cook was released on August 10, 2018, but his freedom is extremely limited: he is obliged to participate in rehabilitation programs for sex offenders, to wear a GPS bracelet, and is forbidden to approach places crowded by children. In 2019, information surfaced that he was living 200 meters from a school in Toledo, but after an investigation by police, it was found that Cook hadn't violated the rules and regulations, and was let off.

== See also ==
- List of serial killers in the United States
