= Boomerang (countermeasure) =

Type of gunfire locator

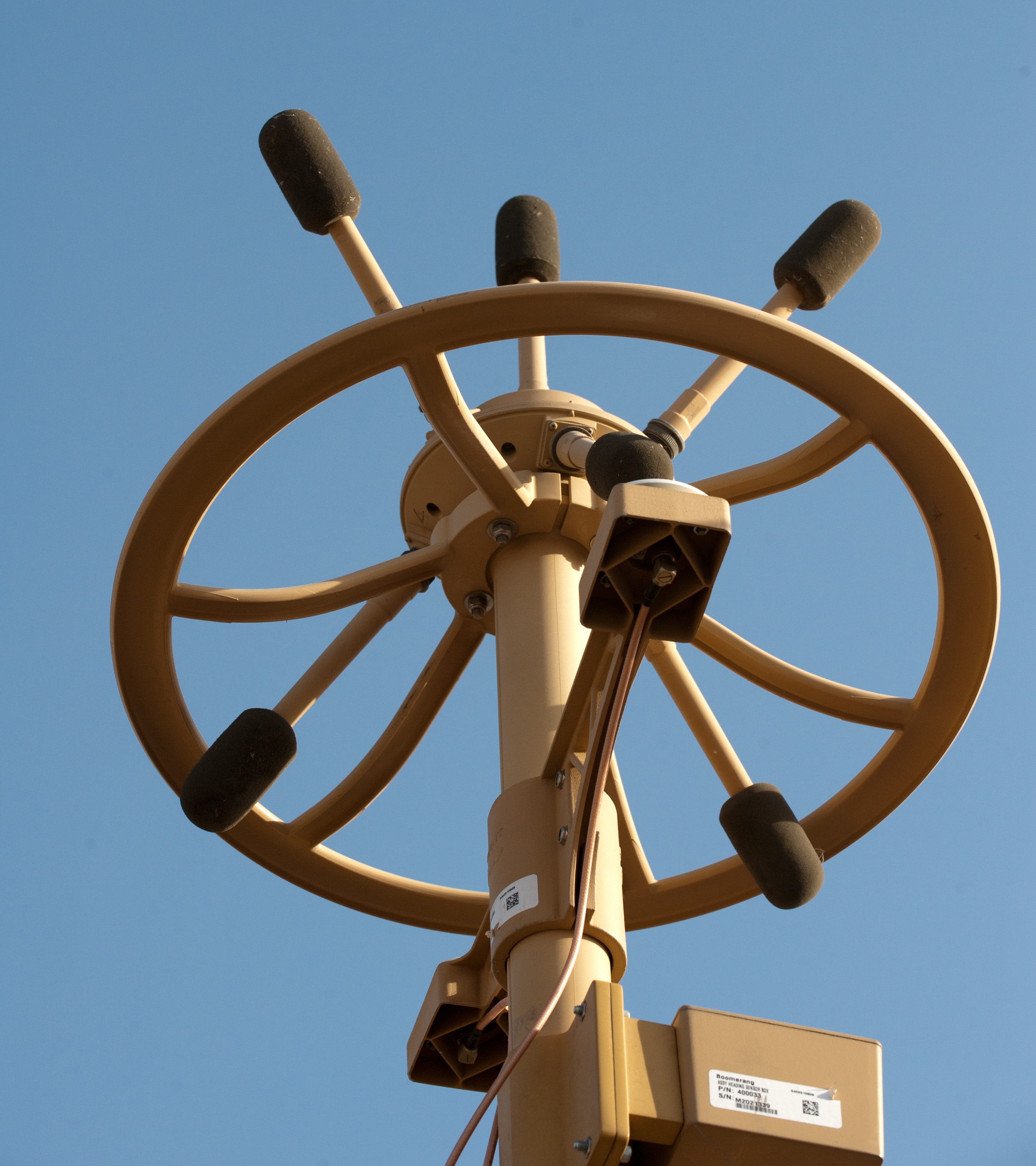
"Boomerang 3" being used by British forces in Afghanistan

Boomerang is a gunfire locator developed by DARPA and BBN Technologies primarily for use against snipers. Boomerang is mounted on mobile vehicles such as the Humvee, Stryker, and MRAP combat vehicles. There were plans to integrate it into the Land Warrior system.

== Development ==
Boomerang grew out of a program conceived by the U.S. Department of Defense in late 2003, months after the traditional combat phase of the Iraq War had ended on 1 May, at a time when it was clear that U.S. troops were increasingly at risk from a growing and aggressive insurgency. Often, troops in noisy Humvees did not know they were being shot at until someone was hit. U.S. Defense Secretary Donald Rumsfeld approached DARPA and asked for near-term solutions that could be applied to the conflict in Iraq. Rumsfeld was looking for something that did not have to be a perfect solution, but was at least better than nothing.

The U.S. Army and Special Operations Command began using a limited number of French-made PILAR anti-sniper systems in 2003. DARPA developed an American system. Karen Wood, a program manager at DARPA, said BBN's previous work was the most impressive that was examined. BBN had previously developed a less sophisticated counter sniper system named "Bullet Ears" under DARPA sponsorship in 1997.

The new requirements included:

- Shooter localization to plus or minus 15-degree accuracy, and within one second of the shot
- Reliability for shot miss distances of one to 30 meters
- Ability to detect and localize fire from AK-47s and other small arms at ranges from 50 to 150 meters
- Reliable performance in urban environments with low buildings
- Operable when mounted on a vehicle moving up to 60 miles per hour (100 km/h) on either rough terrain or highways
- Ability to withstand sand, pebbles, rain, and light foliage impacts
- Ability to deliver alert information in both a voice announcement and on an LED display
- Microphone array and electronics box must be replaceable in the field

The first prototype was developed in 65 days. Challenges that it faced were filtering out noise from the vehicle on which it is mounted (such as loud engines and static sounds from the radio), ignoring sounds similar to that of a gunshot (such as fireworks or a car back-firing), factoring in bullet ricochets, and ignoring outgoing fire from friendly troops. Small quantities of Boomerang were battle tested in Iraq and further improvements led to 2nd and 3rd generation versions called the Boomerang II and Boomerang III. In June 2008 a $73.8 million firm fixed price contract was awarded by the U.S. Army to BBN for 8,131 Boomerang Systems, spares and training services.

In 2005 Boomerang won both the DARPA "Significant Technical Achievement Award" and the Massachusetts Innovation and Technology Exchange (MITX) "Technology Influencer of the Year Award."

Boomerang does not claim to be able to detect shots fired from firearms with sound suppressors.

== Operation ==
The Boomerang unit attaches on a mast to the rear of a vehicle and uses an array of seven small microphone sensors. The sensors detect and measure both the muzzle blast and the supersonic shock wave from a supersonic bullet traveling through the air (and so is less effective against subsonic ammunition). Each microphone detects the sound at slightly different times. Boomerang then computes the direction a bullet is coming from, distance above the ground and range to the shooter in less than one second. Users receive simultaneous visual and auditory information on the point of fire from an LED 12-hour clock image display panel and speaker mounted inside the vehicle. For example, if someone is firing from the rear, the system announces "Shot, 6 o'clock", an LED illuminates at the 6 o'clock position, and the computer tells the user the shooter's range, elevation and azimuth.

Boomerang works in extreme weather, in open field and in urban environments, whether static or moving. BBN states that false shot detections are less than one per thousand hours of system operation at vehicle speeds under 50 miles per hour (80 km/h).

== Related development ==
Starting in 2011, the US Army began issuing the Individual Gunshot Detector (IGD) which is similar to the Boomerang in function and purpose, but is worn by dismounted soldiers.

== The 118th Boston Marathon (2014) ==
Stationary Boomerang III units were utilized in the "Athletes' Village", at the starting line, and finish line areas of the 118th running of The Boston Marathon as a result of the 2013 bombings that took place at the finish line. The Boomerang units were mounted to telephone poles and setup on tripods and networked together so all could be monitored from any of the mobile command units. Some were also deployed on mobile vehicles.

== See also ==
- Sound ranging
