= FireFly Acoustic Threat Detection System =

Fire detection system used by the US army

The FireFly Acoustic Threat Detection System is a system for detecting hostile fire. It has been developed jointly by the US Army Aviation and Missile Research Development and Engineering Command (AMRDEC), the U.S. Army Research Laboratory (ARL) and industry partners. The FireFly acoustic and electro-optical (EO) sensor can operate with Serenity Payload or be deployed as a stand-alone unit. FireFly was designed for support of small installations, independent of installation power.

The $45,000 cost of the FireFly sensor is small enough that systems are considered disposable if a failure occurs, yet its algorithms are capable of grouping threats into classifications of small arms fire, heavy machine gun, rockets artillery and mortar, geolocating the threat with a high degree of spatial accuracy. The FireFly system was initially deployed to Afghanistan in May 2012, to support a threat detection requirement.

== Reusing Existing Natural Energy, Wind & Solar system (RENEWS) ==
Reusing Existing Natural Energy, Wind & Solar system (RENEWS) was a microgrid solution providing alternative power sources to soldiers in combat. RENEWS was developed to address logistical challenges associated with Firefly. Originally deployed in Afghanistan in May 2012, maintaining FireFly’s power supply became a risk for soldiers. RENEWS remedied this problem by producing self-sustaining solar and wind energy for combat technology.

Through harvest of wind and solar power, RENEWS was intended to produce up to 300 watts to remote operations where the power and fuel resupply was difficult or risky. The U.S. Army’s Communications-Electronics Research, Development and Engineering Center started work on RENEWS in 2009 under an American Reinvestment and Recovery Act program for photovoltaics, partnering with ARL and Natick Soldier Research, Development and Engineering Center. RENEWS was first deployed in April 2013.

The RENEWS system consisted of a wind turbine, three 124-watt flexible solar panels, a power conditioner, an AC inverter, and a battery storage/charging unit that contained six BB-2590 rechargeable batteries. RENEWS was designed to power two or three laptops continuously. The storage component provided power at peak demand for about five hours when energy was not being generated by the renewable components. RENEWS components weighed about 100 pounds, and was stored in two cases weighing about 70 pounds each.
