= 2012 Chardon High School shooting =

Mass shooting in Ohio, U.S.

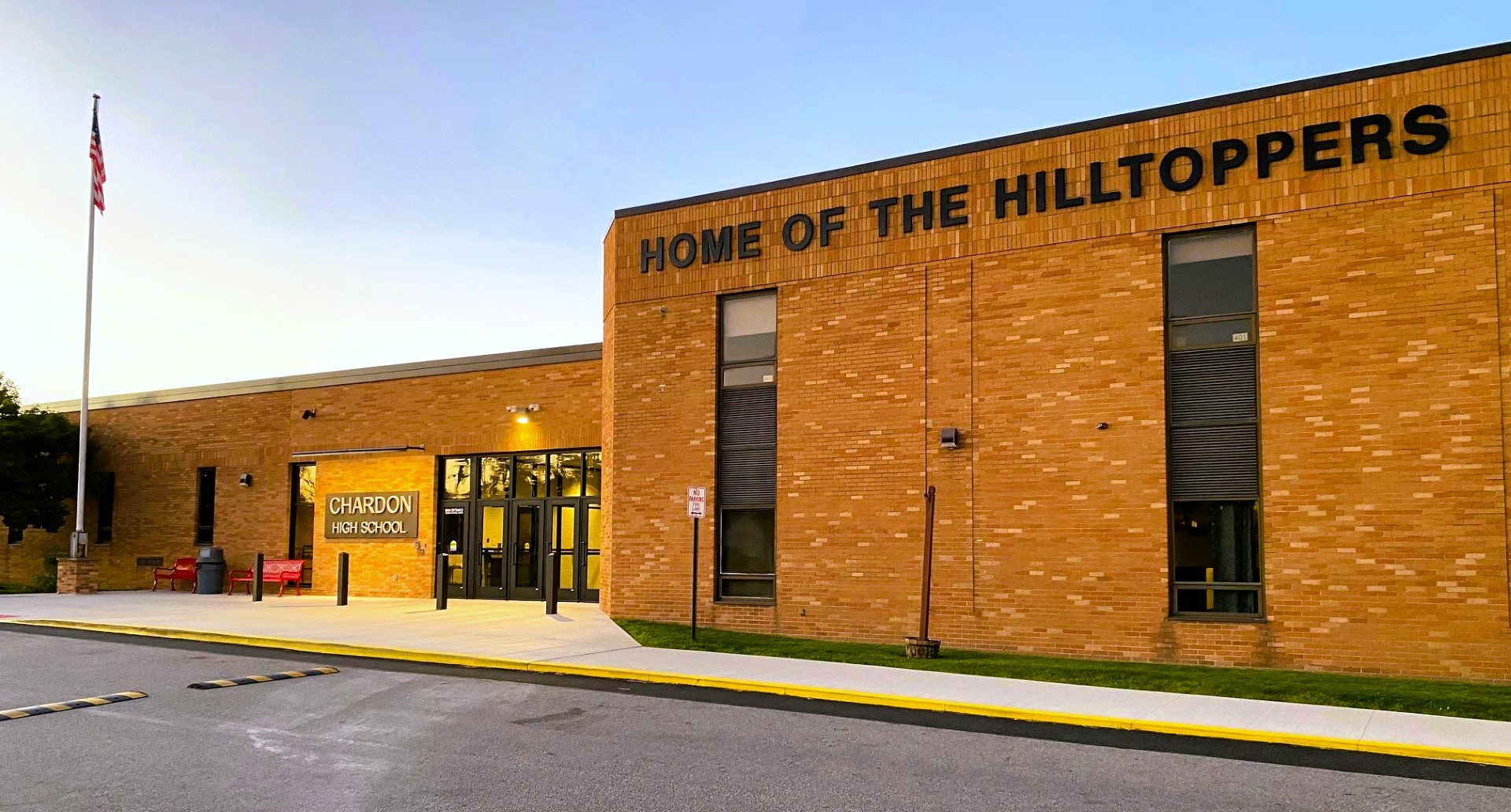
- Chardon High School in 2024

- Location of Chardon, Ohio
- Location: 41°35′28″N 81°12′1″W; Chardon High School; Chardon, Ohio, U.S.
- Date: February 27, 2012; 14 years ago c. 7:30 a.m. (EST; UTC-5)
- Target: Students and staff at Chardon High School
- Attack type: School shooting; mass shooting; triple-murder; mass murder
- Weapons: .22 caliber Ruger MK III semi-automatic pistol; Knife
- Deaths: 3
- Injuries: 3
- Perpetrator: Thomas Lane III
- Defenders: Frank Hall; Joseph Ricci
- Motive: Inconclusive, personal rivalry appeared to account for part
- Verdict: Pleaded guilty
- Convictions: Aggravated murder (3 counts); Attempted aggravated murder (2 counts); Felonious assault
- Sentence: Three consecutive life sentences without the possibility of parole, plus 37 years

On the morning of February 27, 2012, six students were shot at Chardon High School in Chardon, Ohio, United States, three of whom were killed. Witnesses said that the shooter, Thomas Michael "T. J." Lane III, had a personal rivalry with one of his victims. Two other wounded students were also hospitalized, one of whom sustained several serious injuries that have resulted in permanent paralysis. The fifth student suffered a minor injury, and the sixth a superficial wound. It is the deadliest school shooting by a lone shooter in Ohio.

On the evening of February 27, authorities confirmed that the suspect was Thomas Michael "T. J." Lane III, a 17-year-old male former student of Chardon, who was a sophomore at Lake Academy Alternative School and used a bus in common with several victims. Lane used a .22 caliber handgun. Lane was arrested by police near his car parked outside the school shortly thereafter. Lane was ultimately indicted on three counts of aggravated murder, two counts of aggravated attempted murder, and one count of felonious assault. Because of his age, he was detained as a juvenile pending a decision by the prosecution and court as to whether he would be tried as an adult.

Following a competency hearing, in May 2012, a judge determined that Lane was competent to stand trial. Later that month the decision was made to charge Lane as an adult. He pleaded guilty and received three consecutive life sentences without parole on March 19, 2013.

In February 2014 the families of the three deceased students and Nick Walczak filed a wrongful death suit in Lake County against the Chardon School District and Lake Academy Alternative School. The Lake County judge dismissed the District and Lake Academy as parties, retaining only five former and current employees of the Chardon School District and high school as defendants. The families appealed to the Ohio Supreme Court, which declined to hear the case in July 2016. It was returned to the Lake County Common Pleas court.

In addition, attorneys representing the estates of the three deceased students filed federal and state wrongful death suits against the family of T.J. Lane, which was settled in May 2014, including settlement of suits against his father, maternal grandfather, and paternal uncle (and their associated insurance companies). The Lane family agreed to pay nearly $2.7 million.

On September 11, 2014, Lane, along with two older inmates, escaped from Allen Correctional Institution in Lima, Ohio. He was captured the following day, and the three men were transferred to a maximum security prison.

== Details ==
Casualties
1. Daniel Parmertor, 16 (deceased)
2. Russell King Jr., 17 (deceased)
3. Demetrius Hewlin, 16 (deceased)
4. Nate Mueller, 16 (minor injury to ear)
5. Nick Walczak, 17 (shot multiple times in his neck, arm, and back; a bullet also lodged in his cheek; resulted in permanent paralysis)
6. Joy Rickers, 18 (injured in buttocks; released from hospital after approximately 24 hours)

=== Incident ===
Chardon High School was open in the morning before classes, and many students typically gathered in the cafeteria, some to get breakfast. Others waited there for a bus to classes at the related Auburn Career Center, a vocational school offering computer and other classes, and Lake Academy, a regional school for at-risk students referred for help with academic or behavioral issues.

According to reports, a boy stood up in the cafeteria and began shooting at approximately 7:30 a.m. (EST), causing chaos.

The surveillance video showed a shooter, later identified as Thomas "T. J." Lane, shooting four male students at one table with a handgun; he wounded another. Fleeing the school, Lane shot a female student; he was chased out of the school by teacher Joseph Ricci and football coach Frank Hall. Lane was later arrested by police outside the school near his car parked on Woodin Road.

Five students were hospitalized; three died of their injuries within two days. The severely injured Daniel Parmertor, Russell King, and Demetrius Hewlin were flown by helicopter to MetroHealth Medical Center in Cleveland, Ohio, approximately 31 miles by road. Joy Rickers and Nick Walczak were taken to local Hillcrest Hospital. A sixth student, Nate Mueller, was superficially injured by a bullet grazing his right ear and did not require hospital treatment.

=== Murders ===
At noon on February 27, 2012, Chardon Police Chief Tim McKenna announced in a news conference that one of the victims had died. A spokeswoman for Cleveland's MetroHealth Medical Center identified him as 16-year-old Daniel Parmertor, a high school junior. His family issued a statement requesting that their privacy be respected. Parmertor had been in the cafeteria to wait for a bus to the Auburn Career Center vocational school in nearby Concord Township, where he studied computer science. He intended to work with computers.

At 12:42 a.m. the next day, Russell King Jr., 17, was pronounced brain dead at MetroHealth Medical Center. King, a junior, studied alternative energy technologies. He was enrolled at both Chardon High School and at the Auburn Career Center, and was also waiting for the bus. King's family released a statement thanking the public for support and offering sympathy to the families of other victims. They said that King's organs would be donated, as he had wished.

On February 28, 2012, Demetrius Hewlin, 16, the third student transferred to MetroHealth, was reported to have died. His family expressed their sorrow in a statement to the press. Friends of Hewlin said that he liked to work out and wanted to be on the football team. Hewlin's mother, Phyllis Ferguson, in an interview with ABC News, said of her son, "He wasn't a morning person and he was late for school. But that one day he wasn't late. We were running a little late, but we weren't late enough. But it's okay. It's in God's hands. Let His will be done." When questioned about what she would say to the assailant, she said that she would forgive him, because most school shooters did not know what they were doing. She said that her son's organs would be donated, and that she had learned one recipient was a child who was within days of death without a transplant.

=== Other victims ===
Seventeen-year-old Nick Walczak was shot four times, in the arm, neck, cheek, and back. He was taken to Hillcrest Hospital. Joy Rickers, 18, was released from Hillcrest Hospital on February 28 after being treated for a gunshot wound to the buttocks. Nate Mueller, who was not hospitalized, was nicked in his right ear by a bullet. Students Nate Mueller and Nick Walczak were waiting in the cafeteria with King and Parmertor for the bus to their school.

=== Teacher actions ===
After the shooting, students praised two teachers, Frank Hall and Joseph Ricci, as heroes. Students expressed thanks to them for their "courageous actions" on Twitter. Hall was said to have charged at the shooter, who was aiming his gun at him. A student said that Hall frequently spoke of his caring for the students, which was shown by his actions.

Ricci had just started his math class when he heard shots and ordered his students to "lock down". Hearing moaning outside the classroom, Ricci put on a bulletproof vest, opened the door, and dragged wounded student Nick Walczak into the classroom, where he administered first aid. Walczak's family credits Ricci with saving their son's life. A student described these teachers as "two of the greatest leaders in our school."

== Perpetrator ==
Thomas Michael "T. J." Lane III (born September 19, 1994) was identified as the suspect by authorities late on February 27. Because he was a juvenile, authorities were reluctant to release his name; however, CBS News had reported in the afternoon that law enforcement officials had surrounded a house belonging to Thomas Michael Lane Jr., the suspect's father.

In their investigation, police also searched the home of Lane's maternal grandparents, Jack Nolan and his wife, in Chardon Township. Lane did not live there but frequently visited on weekends. The residence, along with other properties owned by the Lane family, was searched extensively on the day of the shooting. A nearby forest, which neighbors said the Lane children used for target practice, was also combed.

At the time of the shooting, Lane was taking classes as a sophomore at Lake Academy, an alternative school in nearby Willoughby. The school, which is also known as the Lake County Educational Service Center, had 55 students in February 2012. They were referred there from public schools in the region because of academic or behavioral needs. Students who complete their educations at Lake Academy graduate with their classmates at the sending schools.

According to student witnesses, Lane had a personal rivalry with King, one of his victims. Other student witnesses said that Lane appeared to aim specifically at King that morning, indicating that he was the first to be shot of the students at his table. The students said that King had previously threatened to beat Lane up, and that Lane had taken up weightlifting in the previous year to prepare to fight King.

Four of the five victims at King's table were students at the Auburn Career Center, a vocational school. Lane and the Auburn students regularly took the same bus from Chardon to their other schools; Lake Academy was the farthest from the home school of Chardon. Lane had known some of the victims from middle school.

There were rumors that a warning about the shooting had been posted on Twitter but this was not verified. News agencies published excerpts from the Facebook profile of a boy named "T. J. Lane". The profile did not give a location, but several of the user's friends were listed as being from Chardon. One entry in particular, dated December 30, 2011, caught attention: the last line read: "Die, all of you." According to a comment posted by Lane on January 20, 2012, he wrote that text as a class assignment.

=== Friend's reactions ===
A friend of Lane described him as "just a very normal teenage boy". She told CNN that she was in "complete shock" from the incident. She said that Lane often seemed sad, but appeared to be completely normal. Another friend said that Lane was regularly teased at school, which made Lane "put a wall around himself" and refuse to divulge personal information. A third student told reporters that Lane had come from "a really broken-down home". He was said to be a quiet person who could be nice to others if he felt comfortable with them.

Students at Lake Academy denied that he had been bullied. They described him as friendly and nice, but not very talkative.

=== Weapon ===
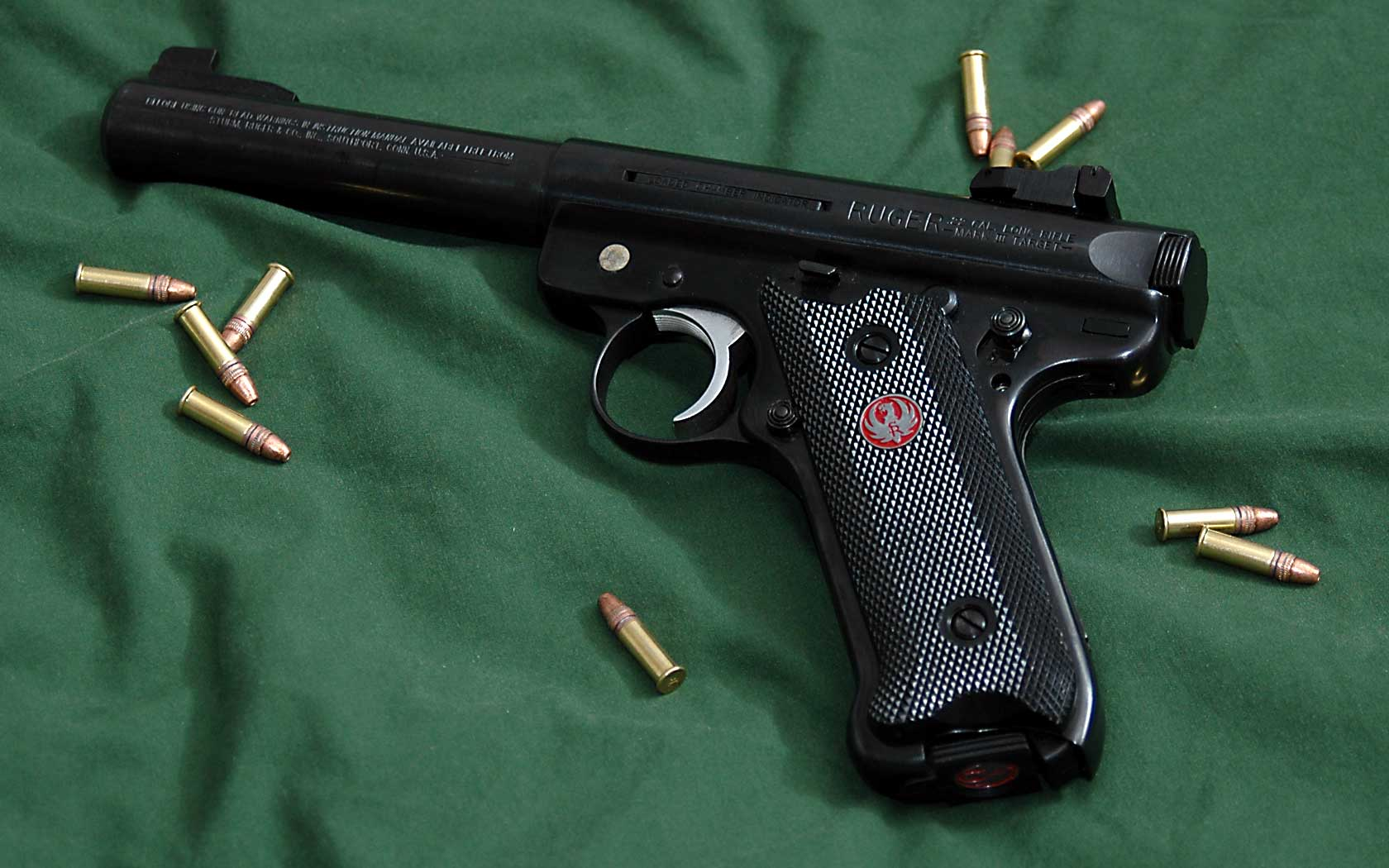
Sturm Ruger MK III

After Lane's arrest, law enforcement determined that the gun used in the shooting had been purchased legally by his uncle. Lane stole the .22-caliber handgun from him. The press reported that it was a Ruger MK III Target .22 caliber semi-automatic handgun. Reports were that the shooter dropped the gun as he fled from the scene, but it was found on the ground along with a knife near the shooter on Woodin Road when he was arrested. (Note: Accompanying cited source is photo evidence and statements on ID impact of murder.)

=== Suspect's prior offenses ===
On February 29, 2012, Timothy J. Grendell, the juvenile court judge presiding over Lane's case, allowed the release of the suspect's juvenile records to the press, which are generally kept sealed. According to these, Lane was arrested twice in December 2009. The first time, Lane restrained his uncle while his cousin hit him. In the second case, Lane hit another boy in the face. To the second charge, Lane pleaded guilty to a count of disorderly conduct.

== Community reaction ==
In the wake of the event, school district officials closed all Chardon schools on February 28. The School Department provided counseling and scheduled a gradual return to school for the students, teachers and staff, with school resuming in full on March 2, 2012. On the night of February 27, several vigils were held, including one at Assembly of God Church. A suggestion by a student on Facebook, resulted in tens of thousands of residents wearing red, one of Chardon High School's school colors, on February 28 in support of the school. The United Way set up The Chardon Healing Fund to help those traumatized by the shooting. Donations of $150,000 had already been made when the new fund was announced on February 28.

In the evening of the day following the attack, thousands of people attended a vigil at St. Mary's Catholic Church in Chardon, where a funeral mass was scheduled for victim Daniel Parmertor, to take place the following weekend. As on February 28, people in attendance wore red. Chardon High School Principal Andy Fetchik spoke to rally the student body and encourage them to help each other during the healing process, while Kasich encouraged Chardon residents to support those who had lost loved ones.

== Political response ==
On the morning of the shooting, Ohio Governor John Kasich issued a statement praising the Chardon Police and Geauga County Sheriff's office for their handling of the incident and pledging support to the community. The following day, Kasich ordered that the flag at the Ohio Statehouse, as well as all flags in Geauga County, be flown at half-staff in honor of the victims.

The following day, President Barack Obama telephoned the school principal, expressing his condolences for the student victims, and saying that both he and First Lady Michelle Obama were praying for the high school community.

=== Students return to school ===
On March 2, 2012, students began to return to school. A student from West Geauga High School, her mother, and a neighbor organized a "Line Up At Chardon" event via Facebook to welcome students back to Chardon High School. They had a sign saying "I'll Stand By You" (referring to the song by The Pretenders). More than 100 youth and children from surrounding school districts, including West Geauga, came to show support. Students of Chardon High School and their parents were given a "walk through" of the school. The senior class officers organized a procession for solidarity from Chardon Square to the school that morning.

Classes resumed the next day. The cafeteria and crime scene had been repainted and reorganized. The table where most of the victims had been sitting was covered with flowers and stuffed animals.

=== Funerals ===
On March 2, 2012, Fred Phelps Jr. was reported to announce that the Westboro Baptist Church (WBC) was planning to "street-preach" about the Ohio shooting at the funeral of Parmertor. Chardon resident Alex Pavlick organized a response via Facebook for people to form a barricade around St. Mary's Church, to protect Parmertor's family and funeral on March 3. By the day of the funeral, a human barricade consisting of thousands had readied, but the WBC protestors did not come.

Three days later Demetrius Hewlin's funeral was held at St. Mary's. Members of four motorcycle clubs, including the Patriot Guard Riders, participated as part of the honor guard. The Patriot Guard had formed to provide a protective barrier for families of fallen soldiers at funerals that have been protested by the Westboro Baptist Church.

== Hearings and trial ==
On February 28, 2012, at 3:50 p.m. (EST), a detention hearing was held for the suspect at Geauga County Juvenile Court in Chardon. According to the LA Times, in the United States teenage suspects under the age of 18 are considered juveniles and treated as such, unless and until prosecutors decide to charge them as adults. Thus, they are held in juvenile rather than adult facilities during detention until trial.

Judge Tim Grendell began the proceeding by asking the media not to take photographs of the defendant until the court determined whether or not he would be tried as an adult. At the prosecutor's request, the judge directed that the attorneys refrain from speaking to the media regarding the proceeding. He outlined conditions under which the media could participate, including not taking any facial photographs of the defendant or his family. After hearing the prosecutor's argument for continuing the detention and receiving no objection, the judge ruled that detention, at the Portage-Geauga Juvenile Detention Center in Ravenna, Ohio, should continue for 15 days. The issues of arraignment and possible transfer to adult court were put off to future dates. The judge stated that the prosecution had until March 1, 2012, to file charges.

After the hearing, prosecutor Dave Joyce indicated that he would attempt to try Lane as an adult and file three counts of aggravated murder, among other charges, for the incident. At the hearing, the prosecutor said that Lane admitted to shooting 10 rounds of ammunition during the incident. Lane told police that he did not know the victims and that they were selected randomly. But student witnesses attested to Lane knowing the victims from school.

Outside defense attorneys observing the hearing raised concerns related to whether Lane's attorney was protecting his client's rights. First, a concern was raised that Lane's attorney agreed with the judge that the gag order would not go into effect until after the press conference that prosecutor Joyce held following the hearing. This exception to the order gave the prosecution the opportunity to announce the defendant's confession publicly, thus influencing the jury pool. A second concern regarded prosecutor Joyce's statement at the conference that Lane "is someone who's not well." Ian Friedman, a criminal attorney and past president of the Ohio Association of Criminal Defense Lawyers, said that such things are generally said by defense attorneys. Another attorney said that, in this case, he would have filed a motion to ensure that the juvenile's mental health would be evaluated before the case was brought to the adult court. As of March 1, 2012, Lane's defense had filed no motions. On March 1, 2012, prosecutors formally charged Lane with three counts of aggravated murder, two counts of aggravated attempted murder, and one count of felonious assault. Lane did not enter a plea when he was arraigned on March 6.

Two additional defense attorneys were assigned to the case in March. The judge postponed the decision as to whether to try Lane as an adult until after a mental competency evaluation was completed. On April 9, Lane again appeared before Judge Grendell, who set the date for a competency hearing for May 2. He also scheduled a hearing for May 12 to determine whether the defendant would be tried as an adult.

The competency evaluation could have been requested by either the prosecution or the defense. One observing attorney said the judge might have made the decision himself. According to Ohio law, "a child may be found competent only if able to grasp the seriousness of the charges, if able to understand the court proceedings, if able to aid in the defense and if able to understand potential consequences. The law says a child with a mental illness or an intellectual or developmental disability may not be found competent."

=== Competency hearing ===
The competency hearing was held on May 2, 2012. Testimony was given by psychiatrist Phillip Resnick, who testified that Lane was mentally ill. He said the defendant was suffering from psychosis that caused hallucinations and loss of contact with reality, but it "does not interfere with Lane's ability to understand the charges against him." Judge Grendell determined at this hearing that Lane was competent to stand trial.

In June, the prosecutor determined to try Lane as an adult. He was indicted on the six charges that were filed earlier in March: three counts of aggravated murder, two counts of attempted murder, and one count of felonious assault. On June 8, he pleaded not guilty to those charges. His bail was set at US$1 million, and he was scheduled to be transferred from the juvenile detention center to county jail (for adults) on June 18. However, on June 20, a motion was filed with the Geauga County Court of Common Pleas stating that if someone were to pay a daily US$120 fee, Lane could remain in the Portage-Geauga County Juvenile Detention Center.

=== Guilty plea ===
On February 26, 2013, Lane pleaded guilty to the charges for which he had been indicted. On March 19, 2013, he was sentenced to three consecutive life sentences without parole.

After entering the courtroom for the sentencing hearing, Lane removed his dress shirt to reveal a white T-shirt which had the word "KILLER" handwritten across the front. He smiled and smirked throughout the hearing. After being sentenced, Lane said to the victims' families and the courtroom, "This hand that pulled the trigger that killed your sons now masturbates to the memory. Fuck all of you," while giving the middle finger to attendees.

== Wrongful death suits, 2014 ==
The families of the three deceased students filed wrongful death suits against T. J. Lane's family: his parents Thomas and Sarah, maternal grandparents Jack Nolan and his wife, and paternal uncle Daniel Lane, the latter having replaced original defendant John Bruening in the suit. The last part was finally settled in May 2014. A federal lawsuit was settled in 2013 with members of the Lane family and Liberty Mutual Insurance. Earlier in 2014, Nolan and his insurer, Nationwide Property & Casualty, Inc., settled. The final settlement brought the total to nearly $2.7 million, given that each of the three families received $890,000 (with each family paying 40% of their settlement to their respective attorneys). Judge Timothy Grendell of the Geauga County Probate/Juvenile Court, who handled the estates of the three deceased students, chose to make the settlement terms public because of the high interest in the case and to warn families of consequences if "youth are allowed access to firearms."

On the second anniversary of the shooting, February 27, 2014, the families of the three deceased students, plus that of Nick Walczak as plaintiff, filed a wrongful death suit against the Chardon School District and Lake Academy Alternative School in Lake County Common Pleas court. Ruling that only Lane was responsible for the harm to these victims, Judge Joe Gibson dismissed the school districts and individual employees as parties to the suit, but retained five defendants who were current or former employees of the Chardon School District: "Schools Superintendent Joseph Bergant, Manager of Operations Dana Stearns, High School Principal Andy Fetchik, and Drew Trimble and Michael Sedlak, who were both assistant principals at the high school." The plaintiffs had argued that more could have been done to prevent the shooting. Gibson's decision was upheld on appeal by the 11th Ohio District Court of Appeals. The defendants appealed to the state supreme court, which in July 2016 declined to hear the case. It was returned to the lower court for resolution, with Judge John P. O’Donnell presiding.

Also on the second anniversary of the shooting, February 27, 2014, the father of Russell King Jr., Russell King Sr., was found dead in his home from a drug overdose.

== 2014 escape from prison ==
At 7:38 p.m on September 11, 2014, Lane escaped from Allen Correctional Institution in Lima, Ohio, along with two older inmates. They used a makeshift ladder to scale a fence during recreation hours. 33-year-old Lindsey Bruce was quickly captured afterward. Lane and the other inmate, identified as 45-year-old Clifford Opperud of Carlisle, Ohio, who was serving a 12-year sentence for aggravated robbery, aggravated burglary, and kidnapping, remained at large. Police conducted searches at a wooded area and a residential neighborhood near the prison.

At 1:20 a.m. the following day, Lane was captured near the woods, and Opperud was apprehended about three hours later.

Chardon High School was closed that same day, and counselors were made available to students and staff. Later in the day, Lane, Opperud, and Bruce were transferred to the Ohio State Penitentiary, a supermax prison in Youngstown, Ohio. In the Youngstown prison, Lane was restricted to his cell for 23 hours a day, with one hour of recreation daily. As of March 2016, Lane was transferred to the Southern Ohio Correctional Facility, a maximum-security prison in Lucasville.

== See also ==
- List of attacks related to secondary schools
- List of school shootings in the United States
- List of school shootings in the United States by death toll
