= GoMart =

Convenience store chain in West Virginia

- Industry: Retail (Convenience stores)
- Founded: 1971 in Gassaway, West Virginia, US
- Founders: John D. Heater
- Headquarters: Gassaway, West Virginia, United States
- Areas served: West Virginia, Ohio, Virginia
- Key people: David Barnette (Chairman) Phil Shuman (President) Kyle Warner (Treasurer) Terry Smith (Corporate Secretary)
- Products: coffee; candy; prepared foods; gasoline; oil products; dairy; snacks; various assortment of beverages
- Number of employees: 1,400
- Website: www.gomart.com

Go-Mart, Inc. (or stylized as GoMart) is a convenience store and gas station chain based in Gassaway, West Virginia. The company currently operates over 120 stores, primarily in West Virginia, with locations also in the border areas of Virginia and Ohio. Go-Mart is the 58th-largest convenience store chain in the United States.^{[1]}

== History ==
=== 1914–1970s: Precursor ===
Go-Mart traces its history to 1914 when brothers Fred, Charles and Rod Heater, operating as the Heater Oil Company, began selling axle grease, kerosene and other petroleum products to farms and businesses in central West Virginia, using flat-bottomed boats on the Little Kanawha River.

By the early 1920s, the Heater brothers were operating bulk plants along railroad lines. After the Great Depression and Charles Heater's death, Fred Heater decided to centralize the business in Gassaway, where it is headquartered today. In the early 1960s, Fred Heater's health was failing, and he sold the business to his sons, John, William and James.

=== 1970s: Founding ===
When West Virginia legalized self-service gasoline pumps in 1970, the Heaters installed the state's first self-service gas station in Shinnston and named it "Go-Tron." Six months later in 1971, the Heaters renovated their Gassaway store into a two-bay garage with four gas pumps and a small convenience store with various grocery items. Manager Karen Sattler named the new store “Go-Mart” after winning an employee contest. By 1977, Go-Mart had 16 stores.

Although it sourced its gasoline privately, Go-Mart originally used Chevron branding, as Chevron did not operate in the area at the time. When Chevron moved into the region as a part of the collapse of Gulf Oil (Chevron ultimately withdrew from West Virginia in 2010),[2] Go-Mart switched to unbranded products and later converted some stations to Shell.

=== 1980-2000s: Innovation ===
During the 1980s, Go-Mart was the first convenience store in West Virginia to add in-store cooking facilities and to provide proprietary-blend beans freshly ground on-site. Go-Mart introduced pay-at-the-pump options and computerized registers in the 1990s, then began incorporating beer caves to its stores in the 2000s.

=== 2010s-Present: Expansion ===
In the 2010s, Go-Mart reintroduced Marty the Gopher as its mascot and launched a new Rewards Program and app. Through the app and integrated Rewards Program, customers have access to monthly coupons, member pricing, contest giveaways and more.

In November 2022, Go-Mart purchased the naming rights of the home field for the Charleston Dirty Birds, now known as GoMart Ballpark.[3] Go-Mart is currently the Official Convenience Store of WVU Athletics, Marshall University Athletics, Fairmont State University Athletics and the Charleston Coliseum & Convention Center.[4] Through its sponsorship with the West Virginia Secondary School Activities Commission (WVSSAC), Go-Mart supports student-athletes throughout West Virginia.

In 2026, Go-Mart launched the Fueling Our Future initiative designed to inspire young readers, support student-athletes, strengthen families and help build brighter futures in communities throughout West Virginia.

Go-Mart continues to expand in West Virginia, Virginia and Ohio. The company now employs approximately 1,400 people and is West Virginia’s 28th largest private employer.[5]
