= Allen-Oakwood Correctional Institution =

Prison in Ohio, United States

Coordinates: 40°46′30″N 84°06′00″W

- Interactive map of Allen-Oakwood Correctional Institution
- Location: Lima, Ohio
- Security class: mixed security
- Capacity: 1,645
- Opened: 1987
- Managed by: Ohio Department of Rehabilitation and Correction
- Director: Warden Angela Hunsinger-Stuff

The Allen-Oakwood Correctional Institution (AOCI), also known as the Allen Correctional Institution, is a prison located in Lima, Ohio, a facility of the Ohio Department of Rehabilitation and Correction.

== History ==
Allen-Oakwood Correctional Institution was built in 1987 in Allen County, Ohio on a 78-acre (32 ha) site 3 miles (4.8 km) northeast of Lima, Ohio that shared land with the Lima Correctional Institution, a medium-security prison that closed in 2004.

Hope Taft, wife of Bob Taft who was the Governor of Ohio from 1999 to 2007, approached the administration at Pickaway Correctional Institution in 2000 regarding the establishment of a reading room for children who visit the prison. The idea spread statewide and the room has been built in all 32 institutions that comprise the Department of Rehabilitation and Correction including the Allen-Oakwood Correctional Institution. Each room has an inmate narrator who reads to visiting children twice a day.

=== 2014 prison escape ===
On the evening of September 11, 2014, 19-year-old T.J. Lane, the perpetrator of the 2012 Chardon High School shooting, escaped from the prison along with two other inmates. Lane had been a difficult inmate, being disciplined seven times during the 18 months he spent in prison since being sentenced to three life sentences for the shooting deaths of his victims. Escapee Lindsey Bruce, who had been serving a life sentence for the 2004 murder of 5-year-old Emily Rimel, was quickly recaptured. Soon after, Lane was also taken back into custody. The third fugitive, Clifford E. Opperud, 45, who was serving time for aggravated robbery, burglary, and kidnapping was the last to be recaptured, being found in the early morning hours of September 12.

=== 2023 prison escape ===
On May 22, 2023, two inmates, Bradley Gillespie and James Lee escaped the prison. Lee was captured two days later after police found him driving a stolen car, which he later crashed. Gillespie's body was later found in the Ohio River during Memorial Day weekend. An autopsy ruled that he had died from drowning. At the time of escape, Gillespie had been in prison for the 2016 murders of Frank Tracy and Hannah Fisher. Lee had been in prison for burglary and safe cracking and was later given additional time for escaping.

== The prison ==
The population of the facility is 1,645 male inmates, most of whom are housed under minimum or medium security. A few prisoners are held under close or maximum security. All Maximum Security inmates are held at the Oakwood compound. The facility employs roughly 439 staff members of which 284 are classified as security. The cost of maintaining each inmate at the facility is approximately $62 per day.

Prisoners can participate in programs that will allow them to earn their GED or even an associates degree from Sinclair College, located 70 miles (110 km) south of the prison. In addition, special classes are offered in turf management, carpentry, masonry and plumbing.

== Special programs ==
Bonds Beyond Bars is a program that allows fathers housed at Allen-Oakwood Correctional Institution to participate in girl scout activities with their daughters in the visiting room on a biweekly basis.

My Child and I is a program that educates inmates on issues regarding family responsibility, relationship building and behavior cycles to promote positive fatherhood.

Angels for Animals is an organization that brings abandoned kittens to Allen-Oakwood Correctional Institution where selected inmates care for the animals 24 hours a day until a home can be found for them. As of 2007, 40 kittens had been brought to the prison.

The Sugar Creek Development Unit (SCDU) is a 60-bed residential facility on the prison grounds that provides psychiatric and psycho-social services for mentally ill inmates. For some, this program is only temporary during their incarceration while for others, the SCDU serves as their living quarters for the duration of their sentence.

The Residential Treatment Unit (RTU) is a special facility that also provides psychiatric assistance for inmates who have difficulty living in the general prison population and are admitted to this program not only from within the Allen-Oakwood Correctional Institution but from other correctional institutions in Ohio as well.

Healing Through Music and Drumming up Hope are two programs that the Lima Symphony Orchestra brings to the Allen-Oakwood Correctional Institution. Through these programs symphony musicians present concerts and facilitate drum circles with inmates.

== Notable inmates ==
Inmate Name	Inmate Number	Sentence	Details
James Ruppert	A169321	Serving 2 consecutive life sentences, died in prison in 2022.	Perpetrator of the Easter Sunday Massacre where he fatally shot 11 members of his own family. He was found guilty of two murders and not guilty of nine of the murders by reason of insanity.
Donald Harvey	A199449	Serving 28 consecutive life sentences plus $270,000 in fines, murdered in prison in 2017.	Known as the "Angel of Death," Harvey was confirmed to have killed at least 37 people with a confession of 87 while working as a hospital orderly. He was murdered by fellow inmates James Elliott (A537867) in 2017.
T.J. Lane	A640654	Serving a sentence of life without the possibility of parole.	Perpetrator of the 2012 Chardon High School Shooting killing 3 students and injuring 3 more. Lane later escaped AOCI for several hours before being captured. Following his capture, he was moved to the Southern Ohio Correctional Facility in Lucasville, Ohio.
Jacob Larosa	A753938	Serving a life sentence with the possibility of parole after 25 years.	Murdered and attempted to rape 94-year-old Marie Belcastro.
Nathaniel Cook	Unknown	Served a 20 to 75 year sentence, currently on parole.	Murdered at least 9 people alongside his brother.
Charles A. McCoy Jr.	A499760	Serving a 27 year sentence.	Perpetrator of the Ohio Highway Sniper Attacks over several months.
Stephen Beightler	A665343	Served 53 month sentence, at facility from 2012 to 2016	Former model who firebombed a church in Marysville, Ohio in 2012, convicted of arson. He was also sentenced to 18 months for assault on a corrections officer and peace officer while being held at the Tri-County Jail in Mechanicsburg awaiting sentencing for the arson.
