= Laverne Pavlinac =

American woman who falsely confessed to assisting in a 1990 murder

- Born: Laverne Arlyce Johnson; December 19, 1932; Marshland, Oregon, U.S.
- Died: March 4, 2003 (aged 70); West Linn, Oregon, U.S.
- Known for: False confession to a murder and service of a prison sentence for it
- Spouses: Warren Brown (m. 1950; died 1978) Rudy Pavlinac (m. 1978; died 1979)
- Children: 4

Laverne Arlyce Pavlinac (née Johnson; December 19, 1932 – March 4, 2003) was an American woman who falsely confessed to assisting in the 1990 murder of 23-year-old Taunja Bennett of Portland, Oregon; she also implicated her boyfriend, John Sosnovske, in Bennett's murder. Both Pavlinac and Sosnovske were convicted, with Pavlinac receiving a life sentence. They served almost 6 years before both were exonerated after serial killer Keith Jesperson confessed to Bennett's murder.

== Background ==
Pavlinac was born Laverne Johnson on December 19, 1932 (Note: While the obituary in the Clatskanie Chief lists her birthdate as December 12, her obituary in The Oregonian lists December 19, which is corroborated by numerous public records.) in Marshland, Oregon. She was raised in Clatskanie, where she graduated from Clatskanie High School in 1950. She worked as an aide at Dammasch State Hospital in Wilsonville, and resided in West Linn. In 1950, she married Warren Brown, who died in 1978. She subsequently married Rudy Pavlinac that year, but the marriage was short-lived, as he died in 1979.

== Murder of Taunja Bennett ==
=== Implication of John Sosnovske ===
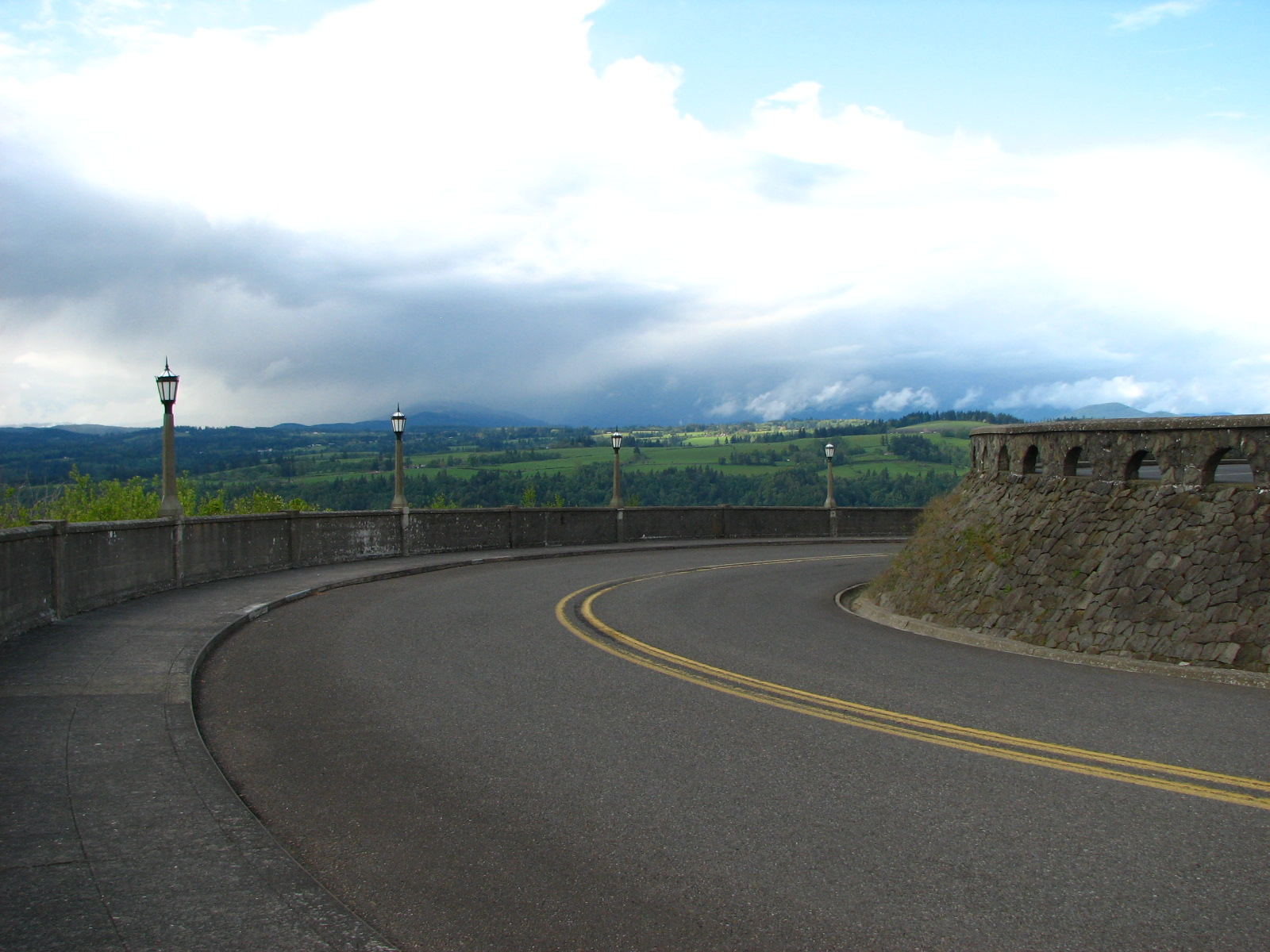
A switchback along the Old Columbia River Highway, near where Bennett's body was found

On February 5, 1990, the Multnomah County Police Department received an anonymous phone call from a woman claiming she overheard a man in a bar bragging about committing the murder of 23-year-old Taunja Bennett, of Portland, Oregon. Bennett had gone missing on January 21, and was found deceased on January 22, lying on the side of an embankment along the Old Columbia River Highway in the Columbia River Gorge, east of Portland. She had been beaten, sexually assaulted, and strangled to death. The anonymous caller identified the braggart as 39-year-old John Sosnovske, but his name was misspelled in the report, which prevented a follow-up from the sheriff's office. The following week, another call was placed to Clackamas County police; in this report, Sosnovske's name was correctly transcribed, and law enforcement began investigating him as a potential suspect. At the time, Sosnovske was a parolee who had previous DUI offenses. Through police correspondence with Sosnovske's parole officer, it was determined that the caller who implicated him was Laverne Pavlinac, Sosnovske's 58-year-old girlfriend.

Both Pavlinac and Sosnovske were separately interviewed by law enforcement, and Pavlinac was sent home with a recording wire, which police hoped would record Sosnovske implicating himself in conversation; however, Sosnovske failed to implicate himself. In subsequent interviews, Pavlinac told law enforcement that on the night of January 21, she had received a phone call from Sosnovske, who told her he was "in trouble" and asked her to meet him at a truck stop in Troutdale. Upon her arrival, she claimed that Sosnovske was hiding between two large trailers, and that the body of Bennett lay wrapped in a blanket at his feet. Pavlinac initially thought she was ill, but was told by Sosnovske that she was in fact dead. Pavlinac claimed the two rolled Bennett's body into a shower curtain that she had brought, and disposed of her body along the Old Columbia River Highway, around 32 km (20 mi) east in the Columbia River Gorge. She also stated that before disposing of Bennett's body, Sosnovske cut a piece of fabric from her jeans to keep as a souvenir.

Pavlinac accompanied law enforcement to the truck stop, where she identified the specific location she claimed to have seen Sosnovske standing with Bennett's body; she also accompanied them to the location where Bennett's body had been found, accurately identifying it. Based on Pavlinac's interviews with law enforcement, Sosnovske was arrested.

=== Subsequent confession ===
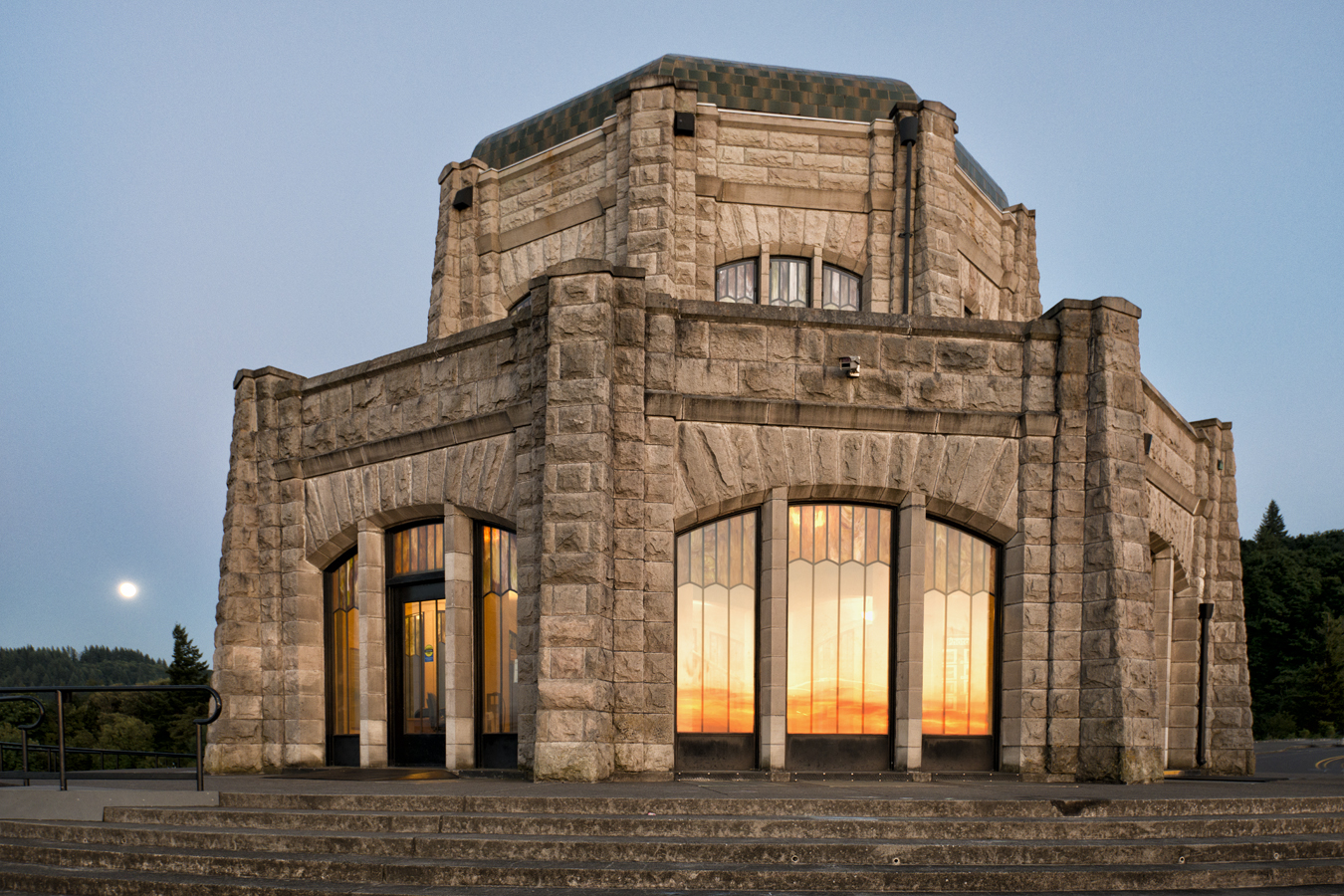
Pavlinac falsely claimed to have helped Sosnovske murder Bennett inside the Vista House on Crown Point; Jesperson, Bennett's actual killer, later admitted to dumping her body off the embankment near Crown Point

Following Sosnovske's arrest, a forensic analysis of Pavlinac's vehicle was completed, but no evidence indicating a body had been transported in it was found. The shower curtain, which Pavlinac claimed was thrown out of the car along the side of Interstate 84, was also not located. Pavlinac's story was also at odds with several eyewitness accounts which placed Bennett at a bar approximately 40 km (25 mi) from where Pavlinac claimed Sosnovske met Bennett. These eyewitnesses stated that they saw Bennett playing pool with two unidentified men, neither of whom was Sosnovske.

In a subsequent interview with police, Pavlinac altered her story significantly: she now claimed that when she arrived at the truck stop on the night of January 21, Bennett was alive and willingly got into her car with Sosnovske. Pavlinac claimed she began to drive toward northeast Portland, where Bennett said she lived with her mother, but Sosnovske forced her to drive east on Interstate 84 instead, before punching Bennett in the face and rendering her unconscious. Pavlinac said she drove to Crown Point, where the three entered the Vista House, an historic building which serves as a rest stop. Inside the Vista House, Pavlinac stated she held a rope around Bennett's neck while Sosnovske raped her, eventually strangling her to death.

After Pavlinac relayed this account of events, she was arrested, and both she and Sosnovske were indicted in Bennett's murder.

== Trial and conviction ==
Pavlinac's trial began on January 24, 1991. During the trial, she recanted her confession, claiming that she had lied to police in an attempt to escape her relationship with Sosnovske, who she said was physically abusive to her throughout their ten-year relationship. She testified in court: "I started a lie, and it snowballed on me." In the midst of Pavlinac's trial, a graffito was found inside a rest stop bathroom in Livingston, Montana, which read: "I killed Tanya [sic] Bennett Jan. 21, 1990 in Portland, Oregon. I beat her to death, raped her, and I loved it. Yes, I'm sick, but I enjoy myself too. People took the blame and I'm free."

Another graffito of a similar nature was found in a rest stop in Umatilla, Oregon; however, they were dismissed of having evidentiary value, and not introduced in Pavlinac's trial. Pavlinac was ultimately convicted of Bennett's murder, and sentenced to life imprisonment on January 31, 1991. A key piece of evidence was her taped confession. Sosnovske pleaded no contest to murder in order to avoid the death penalty, and was also given a sentence of life imprisonment.

== Conviction of Keith Jesperson ==
Keith Hunter Jesperson, also known as the "Happy Face Killer", a serial killer who frequented the Pacific Northwest, was arrested in March 1995 for another murder, and subsequently confessed to the murders of eight total women, including Bennett. Three years prior to his arrest, Jesperson wrote a series of letters to The Oregonian detailing his killing spree, including specific details of Bennett's murder. He pleaded guilty and was convicted of Bennett's murder on November 2, 1995, after formally confessing to police in September. In his confession, Jesperson recounted how he had picked up Bennett at a bar in Portland on the evening of January 21, 1990. Jesperson took her back to his residence, where he beat and strangled her to death. That night, Jesperson drove to Crown Point, and dumped her body over a ravine along the switchbacks on the Old Columbia River Highway. He subsequently disposed of his shoes along the interstate, and threw Bennett's Walkman cassette player into the Sandy River from a bridge in Troutdale. James McIntyre, the deputy district attorney who tried the case against Pavlinac in 1991, stated that Jesperson's claims were completely corroborated by law enforcement.

== Exoneration and later life ==
Following Jesperson's conviction, the prosecutors in Pavlinac and Sosnovske's cases urged Judge Paul Lipscomb of the Third Circuit Court to exonerate them, and began petitioning his court on October 26; he initially refused to free them, stating that Jesperson's involvement "didn't necessarily absolve Pavlinac and Sosnovske". Jesperson himself also began writing letters to news and media outlets following his arrest and conviction, urging the courts to free Pavlinac and Sosnovske. On November 27, 1995, Lipscomb exonerated both, with Sosnovske's conviction being set aside due to Pavlinac's violation of his civil rights. Lipscomb said: "There's no longer any doubt that these two individuals are innocent. The evidence is compelling." Despite this, Lipscomb chastised Pavlinac during the exoneration hearing for her abuse of the judicial system.

Pavlinac, along with Sosnovske, was released from prison on November 28, 1995. She died of heart failure in Wilsonville on March 4, 2003, aged 70.

== Cultural portrayals ==
Lorraine Petrovich, a character based on Pavlinac, was portrayed by Ann-Margret in the 1999 television film Happy Face Murders, inspired by her confession to Taunja Bennett's murder and subsequent exoneration.

The "Happy Face Killer" murders were also covered in a two-part episode of the crime docuseries Catching Killers, Season 1.

== Sources ==
- Berry-Dee, Christopher (2011). Dead Men Talking: The World's Worst Killers in Their Own Words. London: John Blake. ISBN 978-1-843-58381-3.
- Newton, Michael (2006). The Encyclopedia of Serial Killers. New York: Infobase Publishing. ISBN 978-0-816-06987-3.
- Olsen, Jack (2002). I: The Creation of a Serial Killer. New York: Macmillan. ISBN 978-0-312-98384-0.
- Stanford, Phil (2009). "Laverne Pavlinac". In Warden, Rob; Drizin, Steven A. (eds.). True Stories of False Confessions. Evanston, Illinois: Northwestern University Press. pp. 367–375. ISBN 978-0-810-12603-9.
