= Vi Gale =

American poet (1917–2007)

- Born: Viola Håkansson; 1917; Noret, Dalarna County, Sweden
- Died: 2007 (aged 89–90); Portland, Oregon, United States
- Citizenship: United States
- Education: Clatskanie High School
- Alma mater: University of Colorado Boulder; Portland State University; Lewis & Clark College; University of Oregon
- Occupations: Poet; Publisher
- Spouse: Jim Gale (m. 1942)

Viola M. Gale (née Håkansson; 1917–2007) was a Swedish-born American poet and publisher, who worked in Oregon. She began writing poems and short stories that were published in minor magazines and reviews in the 1950s. Gale's first book was published in 1959, and released five more throughout her life. In 1974, she established the small printing house Prescott Street Press in Portland to promote unknown authors and produce well-designed affordable books. One of Gale's works was selected by the Oregon Cultural Heritage Commission as one of 100 Oregon books from 1800 to 2000 "best representing the state's literary heritage" in 2003.

== Early life ==
Gale was born Viola Håkansson in 1917, in a rural village called Noret along Central Sweden's Västerdal River in Dalarna County. She was the daughter of Erland G. Håkansson and Maria Håkansson. Gale had one brother. The family moved to the United States in the final year of mass immigration from Sweden in 1923, when Gale was six years old. They came to the country via Ellis Island, and settled in the Swedish community of Clatskanie, Oregon, where her father worked as a wood logger for Simon Benson. Following graduation from Clatskanie High School in 1934, she worked as the Clatskanie librarian, and sold bread. Gale left Clatskanie in 1940 and moved to Portland. She became a naturalized United States citizen that same year, and began to attend literature and writing courses at the University of Colorado Boulder, Portland State University, Lewis & Clark College, and the University of Oregon in the late 1940s.

== Career ==
Following the end of World War II, she found employment authoring product promotions and started writing poems and short stories in the 1950s. Gale's work was published in minor magazines and reviews, and she won the Oregon Poetry Prize in 1954. In 1955, she met poet May Sarton at a writer's conference at the University of Colorado Boulder, and was encouraged by Sarton to continue writing poetry. Gale won the 1958 Swallow Press New Poetry Series Award. In 1959, she sent a poetry collection to publisher Alan Swallow, who became her mentor and brought out her first book, Several Houses, that year. Gale's second book, Love Always, followed six years later. Throughout the 1960s, she connected with contemporary Swedish poetry. Gale began teaching as director of creative writing workshops at the Young Women's Christian Association in 1962, was the writer-in-residence for Eastern Oregon College in 1968, and lectured at Clatsop Community College in 1969.

She authored Nineteen Ing Poems in 1970, then Clouded Sea in 1974. In 1974, Gale established the small publishing house Prescott Street Press, to promote unknown authors and produce affordable books that were well-designed. The publishing house received initial support from grants by the National Endowment for the Arts and had national distribution and helped to begin the career of several writers. Her final writing of poems, Odd Flowers & Short-Eared Owls, was self-published in 1984. Gale contributed to Colorado Quarterly, December, Kansas Magazine, Midwest Quarterly Review, Northwest Review, Poetry Northwest, Poetry (Chicago), Pacific Spectator among other publications. Her work was featured in the books Oregon Signatures in 1959, Golden Year: The Poetry Society of American Anthology in 1960, and NW Manuscript Poems in 1966.

== Personal life ==
Gale married Jim Gale in 1942. She died in 2007, having lived the whole of her adult life in Oregon and having never gone back to Sweden.

== Method and legacy ==
Gale's poems came from personal experiences and memories, with some featuring Scandinavian recollections, and several displaying "a keen sense of place". She said she was highly encouraged by opening up American poetry by the Beat Generation. Through Gale's career, she wrote in a more experimental and relaxed away from "the slightly formal feel of the strict stanzaic patterns in her early work".

Her work, Several Houses, was selected as one of 100 Oregon books from 1800 to 2000 by the Oregon Cultural Heritage Commission as "best representing the state's literary heritage" in 2003. In February 2008, a celebration of the life and career of Gale took place in Portland. The Lewis & Clark College Special Collections and Archives holds a collection relating to Gale, including her biographical information, personal correspondence, photographs, poetry manuscripts, and teaching materials connected to her life and other materials about Prescott Street Press.
