= Catching Killers =

2021 Netflix docuseries

- Genre: Docu-series
- Country of origin: United States
- Original language: English
- No. of seasons: 3
- No. of episodes: 12

Production
- Editors: Richard Granberry; Wesley Poole
- Production company: Netflix

Original release
- Network: Netflix
- Release: December 8, 2021 – June 23, 2023

Catching Killers is a true crime television docuseries produced by RAW, released on Netflix on November 4, 2021. The series follows police and prosecutors as they investigate, arrest and convict the world's most violent killers.

== Summary ==
Each episode focuses on some infamous serial killer cases, from the detectives' perspectives. The investigators tell their own struggles, mistakes and efforts to catch the elusive perpetrators, and how it affected both their personal and professional lives.

== Episodes ==
Series overview
Season	Episodes	Originally released
1	4	November 4, 2021
2	4	February 9, 2022
3	4	June 23, 2023

=== Season 1 (2021) ===
No. overall	No. in season	Title	Location	Original release date
1	1	Body Count: The Green River Killer	Seattle, Washington	November 4, 2021
The unsolved murders around the Green River haunt investigators for decades, until crime scene science finally catches up with the perpetrator.
2	2	Manhunter: Aileen Wuornos	Daytona Beach, Florida	November 4, 2021
A serial killer deadly trip in 1990 leaves several men dead and spurs investigators to go undercover to find an unlikely suspect in Port Orange, Florida.
3	3	True Lies, Part 1: The Happy Face Killer	Portland, Oregon	November 4, 2021
Part 1 : Odd suspects, questionable confessions and ever-shifting stories confuse detectives in the hunt for an Oregon woman's killer in the early 1990s.
4	4	True Lies, Part 2: The Happy Face killer	Portland, Oregon	November 4, 2021
Part 2 : A consequential letter surfaces with stirring claims and upends the seemingly closed case, calling into question the guilt of the convicted criminals.

=== Season 2 (2022) ===
No. overall	No. in season	Title	Location	Original release date
5	1	Bind, Torture, Kill: BTK	Wichita, Kansas	February 9, 2022
A Kansas serial killer reemerges after 30 years; using DNA technology and media help, investigators race to prevent another murder.
6	2	Thrill Kills: The Phoenix Serial Shooter	Phoenix, Arizona	February 9, 2022
A serial shooter targets random pedestrians on the streets, leading detectives on a hunt for a criminal driven to kill for sport.
7	3	Missing Men Part 1: The Toronto Village Killer	Toronto, Canada	February 9, 2022
Part 1: After multiple gay men go missing, detectives follow a tip from Bern, Switzerland with horrific claims of cannibalism.
8	4	Missing Men Part 2: The Toronto Village Killer	Toronto, Canada	February 9, 2022
Part 2: As more men go missing, a task force assembles. New surveillance footage and recovered computer files provide a final chance to identify the killer.

=== Season 3 (2023) ===
No. overall	No. in season	Title	Location	Original release date
9	1	End of the Line: The Railroad Killer	Texas	June 23, 2023
Dubbed "The Railroad Killer", a man hops trains to his victims' homes, bludgeoning them, helping himself to their food – and evading police for years.
10	2	Night Terror: New York Zodiac Killer	New York City	June 23, 2023
In the '90s, a killer in New York selects his victims based on their birth signs. Can the cops catch him before he attacks all 12 symbols of the zodiac?
11	3	Manhunt: The Olympic Park Bomber	Atlanta, Georgia	June 23, 2023
A deadly bomb explodes at the 1996 Olympic Games. But as FBI agents investigate subsequent attacks, they realize they've also become targets. After years of investigation, they finally tracked down a suspect in Asheville, North Carolina.
12	4	Trained to Kill: The DC Sniper	Washington, D.C.	June 23, 2023
In 2002, a sniper shoots six victims in a Washington suburb, linking him to a spree that resulted in one of the largest manhunts in American history.

== Audience viewership ==
According to weekly streaming data reported by Media Play News, based on metrics from research firm PlumResearch, Catching Killers reached 3.8 million unique viewers on Netflix during the week of 26 June – 2 July 2023.
