= Ángel Maturino Reséndiz =

Cross-border Mexican serial killer and rapist (1959–2006)

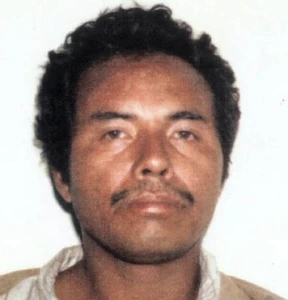

FBI Ten Most Wanted Fugitive
- Charges: Serial murder, sexual assault
- Alias: Rafael Resendez-Ramirez, Ángel Reyes Reséndiz

Description
- Born: Ángel Leoncio Reyes Reséndiz; August 1, 1959; Izúcar de Matamoros, Puebla, Mexico
- Died: June 27, 2006 (aged 46); Huntsville Unit, Huntsville, Texas, U.S.
- Cause of death: Execution by lethal injection

Status
- Convictions: Florida; Burglary; Vehicle theft Aggravated assault Federal; Illegal re-entry False representation of citizenship False statements to federal authorities Using an alias to induce a passport New Mexico; Burglary; Texas; Capital murder
- Penalty: Death
- Executed: June 27, 2006 (aged 46)
- Executed

Angel Maturino Reséndiz (August 1, 1959 – June 27, 2006), known as The Railroad Killer, was a Mexican serial killer suspected in as many as 23 murders across the United States and Mexico during the 1990s, some of which involved sexual assault. He had become known as "The Railroad Killer", as most of his crimes were committed near railroads, where he had jumped off the trains which he was using to travel.

On June 21, 1999, he briefly became the 457th fugitive listed by the FBI on its Ten Most Wanted Fugitives list, before he surrendered to the Texas authorities on July 13, 1999. He was convicted of capital murder in Texas, and executed by lethal injection in 2006.

== Personal life ==
Ángel Leoncio Reyes Reséndiz was born in Izúcar de Matamoros, Puebla, Mexico, but he had taken his mother's and stepfather's surnames calling himself Ángel Maturino Reséndiz.

== Murders and methodology ==
By illegally jumping on and off trains within and across Mexico, Canada, and the United States, generally crossing borders illegally, Reséndiz was able to evade authorities for a considerable time. He used many aliases, but was chiefly known and sought after as Rafael Resendez-Ramirez. His birth name was Ángel Leoncio Reyes Recendis. United States government records show that he had been deported to Mexico at least four times since first entering the U.S. in 1973.

Reséndiz killed at least 15 people with rocks, a pickaxe, and other blunt objects, mainly in their homes. He was sometimes referred to as The Railway Killer or The Railcar Killer. After each murder, he would linger in the homes for a while, mainly to eat. Reséndiz took sentimental items, and also laid out the victims' driver's licenses to learn about their lives. He stole jewelry and other items, and gave them to his wife and mother, who lived in Rodeo, Durango, Mexico. Much of the jewelry was sold or melted down. After Reséndiz's surrender, some of the stolen items that had been removed from his victims' homes were returned by his wife and mother. Money was sometimes left at the scene. He raped some of his female victims; however, rape was probably a secondary intent. As Reséndiz himself was of small stature, he did not attack large victims, who could have overpowered him. Most of his victims were found covered with a blanket, or otherwise obscured from immediate view.

== Victims ==
Number	Name	Sex	Age	Date of Murder	Location	Notes
1	Unidentified woman	F	Unknown	Unknown date in 1986	Bexar County, Texas	Shot four times with a .38-caliber weapon, with her body dumped in an abandoned farmhouse. Reséndiz stated that he met the woman at a homeless shelter. They took a motorcycle trip together, bringing a gun along to fire for target practice. Reséndiz said that he shot and killed the woman for disrespecting him. Remains of Jane Doe found March 23, 1986.
2	Unidentified man	M	Unknown	Unknown date in 1986	Bexar County, Texas	Supposedly the boyfriend of the previous victim. Reséndiz said he shot and killed him, and dumped his body in a creek somewhere between San Antonio and Uvalde. Reséndiz said that he killed the man because the man was involved in black magic. This man's body has never been found, and nothing is known about him, except what Reséndiz told authorities. Reséndiz confessed to these first two murders in September 2001, in hopes that doing so would hasten his execution.
3	Michael White	M	22	July 19, 1991	San Antonio, Texas	Bludgeoned to death with a brick. His body was found in the front yard of an abandoned downtown house. Reséndiz also confessed to this murder in September 2001. During this confession, he drew a map of the crime scene, and claimed that he killed White because he was homosexual.
4	Jesse Howell	M	19	March 23, 1997	Ocala, Florida	Bludgeoned to death with a railcar air brake hose coupling, and left beside the railroad tracks that ran through Belleview. Howell had travelled to Florida from Illinois with his fiancé, Wendy Von Huben, who was also murdered by Reséndiz shortly after Howell's death. Reséndiz claimed to investigators that he killed the couple because he believed they were "anti-Christians".
5	Wendy Von Huben	F	16	March 23, 1997	Ocala, Florida	Raped, strangled, suffocated both manually and with duct tape, and buried in a shallow grave in Sumter County, Florida. Von Huben and her fiancé, Jesse Howell, had met Reséndiz near Jacksonville. Hoping to find work picking oranges, the teenaged couple had caught a ride aboard a train's grain car that was also occupied by Reséndiz. He claimed that his motive for their murders was his assumption of Von Huben and Howell being "anti-Christians".
6	Roberto Castro	M	54	July 5, 1997	Colton, California	A drifter beaten to death with a piece of plywood in a rail yard. Though not officially charged, Reséndiz is considered the prime suspect in this case.
7	Christopher Maier	M	21	August 29, 1997	Lexington, Kentucky	A University of Kentucky student walking along nearby railroad tracks with his girlfriend, 20-year-old Holly Dunn Pendleton, when the two were attacked by Reséndiz, who bludgeoned Maier to death with a 52-pound rock. Reséndiz raped and severely beat Pendleton, who nearly died. Pendleton, the only known survivor of Resèndiz's killings, went on to appear on the Biography channel television programs I Survived..., 48 Hours: Live to Tell, and the ID channel series Dates from Hell ("A Killer Night") and People Magazine Investigates: Surviving a Serial Killer; her story was also told in the UK newspaper The Guardian.
8	Leafie Mason	F	87	October 4, 1998	Hughes Springs, Texas	Beaten to death with an antique fire iron after entering her house through a window.
9	Fannie Whitney Byers	F	81	December 10, 1998	Carl, Georgia	Bludgeoned to death with a tire rim in her home, which was located near CSX Transportation railroad tracks. A Lexington couple was charged with Byers' murder, but according to authorities, Reséndiz admitted to an FBI agent that he killed her.
10	Claudia Benton	F	39	December 17, 1998	West University Place, Texas	A pediatric neurologist at the Baylor College of Medicine who was raped, stabbed, and bludgeoned repeatedly with a statue after Reséndiz entered her home near the Union Pacific railroad tracks. Police found Benton's Jeep Cherokee in San Antonio and found Reséndiz's fingerprints on the steering column. At the time of the murder, Reséndiz had a warrant for his arrest for burglary, but not yet for murder.
11	Norman J. Sirnic	M	46	May 2, 1999	Weimar, Texas	Norman J. Sirnic and his wife Karen Sirnic were bludgeoned to death with a sledgehammer in the parsonage of the United Church of Christ. The Sirnics' red Mazda was found in San Antonio three weeks later, and fingerprints linked their case with Claudia Benton's murder.
12	Karen Sirnic	F	47	May 2, 1999	Weimar, Texas	Norman J. Sirnic and his wife Karen Sirnic were bludgeoned to death with a sledgehammer in the parsonage of the United Church of Christ. The Sirnics' red Mazda was found in San Antonio three weeks later, and fingerprints linked their case with Claudia Benton's murder.
13	Noemi Dominguez	F	26	June 4, 1999	Houston, Texas	Bludgeoned to death with a pickaxe in her apartment. Dominguez was a schoolteacher at Houston Independent School District's Benjamin Franklin Elementary School. Seven days later, her white Honda Civic was discovered by state troopers on the International Bridge in Del Rio, Texas.
14	Josephine Konvicka	F	73	June 4, 1999	Dubina, Texas	Bludgeoned with the same pickaxe used to kill Dominguez in her farmhouse near Weimar, which is also where the Sirnics were murdered. Reséndiz tried to steal Konvicka's car but could not find the car keys.
15	George Morber Sr.	M	80	June 15, 1999	Gorham, Illinois	Shot in the head with a shotgun. The house was located only 100 yards (90 m) away from a railroad track. Later police found Morber's red pickup truck in Cairo, Illinois, located 60 miles south of Gorham. In addition, the Jackson County Sheriff's Office found fingerprints in the Morbers' ransacked home, positively identifying Reséndiz as the killer.
16	Carolyn Frederick	F	52	June 15, 1999	Gorham, Illinois	George Morber's daughter, she was bludgeoned to death with the same shotgun used to kill her father.

Reséndiz was tried and sentenced to death for the Benton murder.

== Arrest and trial ==
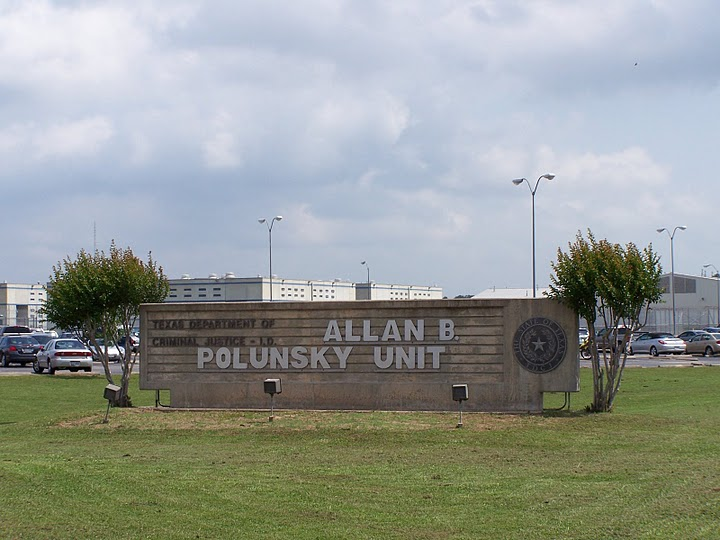
The Allan B. Polunsky Unit houses the State of Texas death row for men

Prior to his surrender at the El Paso bridge, Reséndiz had been arrested by the U.S. Border Patrol and deported back to Mexico. Reséndiz's sister, Manuela, had seen her brother's FBI's Most Wanted Poster and feared that her brother might kill someone else, or be killed by Mexican bounty hunters, so she contacted the police. On July 12, 1999, a Texas Ranger, Drew Carter, accompanied by Kimberley Barkhausen (FBI), Manuela and a spiritual guide, met up with Reséndiz on a bridge connecting El Paso, Texas with Ciudad Juárez, Chihuahua. Reséndiz surrendered to Carter.

During a court appearance, Reséndiz accused Carter of lying under oath because Reséndiz's family was under the impression that he would be spared the death penalty. Reséndiz's ultimate fate, however, was decided by a jury, not Carter. In 1999, former Texas Attorney General Jim Mattox, wary of the controversy miring the many confessions and recantations by serial killer Henry Lee Lucas, remarked of Reséndiz, "I hope they don't start pinning on him every crime that happens near a railroad track." (Note: He received the Texas Department of Criminal Justice ID#999356.)

=== Mexican government response ===
Reséndiz's defense attorney along with the assistance of Mexican consul-general in Houston Rodulfo Figueroa Aramoni (consul general, 1998–1999) and other Mexican government officials combined efforts to negotiate with the state of Texas for an extradition to Mexico in hopes to spare Reséndiz's life from the death penalty.

In 2006, Mexican presidential spokesman Ruben Aguilar said at a press conference that Mexican Foreign Relations Secretary Luis Ernesto Derbez had contacted then Texas Governor Rick Perry to ask for clemency for Maturino Reséndiz.

"We will continue fighting (for the condemned man) because we believe that the death penalty does not solve absolutely anything," Mexican presidential spokesman Ruben Aguilar said.

He was sentenced to death on May 22, 2000, by a Texas court.

== Mental health ==
On June 21, 2006, a Houston judge ruled that Reséndiz was mentally competent to be executed. Upon hearing the judge's ruling, Reséndiz said, "I don't believe in death. I know the body is going to go to waste. But me, as a person, I'm eternal. I'm going to be alive forever." He also described himself as half-man and half-angel and told psychiatrists he could not be executed because he did not believe he could die. These and similar statements led Dr. Pablo Stewart, a bilingual psychiatrist who evaluated Reséndiz on two occasions in 2006, to conclude that Reséndiz was not then competent to be executed as "...delusions had completely taken over [Reséndiz's] thought processes..."

== Execution ==
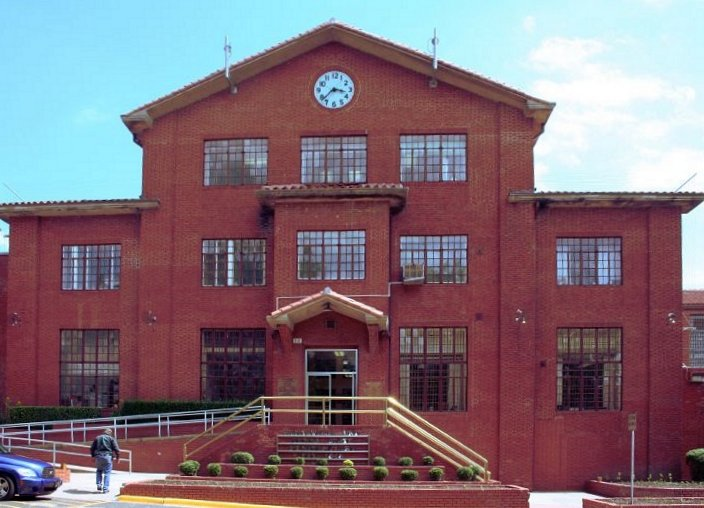
Huntsville Unit, where Reséndiz died

Despite an appeal pending with the 5th U.S. Circuit Court of Appeals, Reséndiz's death warrant was signed for the murder of Claudia Benton. He was housed in the Polunsky Unit in West Livingston, Texas awaiting execution. He was executed in the Huntsville Unit in Huntsville, Texas, on June 27, 2006, by lethal injection.

In his final statement, Reséndiz said, "I want to ask if it is in your heart to forgive me. You don't have to. I know I allowed the Devil to rule my life. I just ask you to forgive me and ask the Lord to forgive me for allowing the devil to deceive me. I thank God for having patience in me. I don't deserve to cause you pain. You do not deserve this. I deserve what I am getting." Reséndiz was pronounced dead at 8:05 p.m. CDT (01:05 UTC) on June 27, 2006. Claudia Benton's husband, George, was present at the execution and said Reséndiz was "evil contained in human form, a creature without a soul, no conscience, no sense of remorse, no regard for the sanctity of human life."

== Media ==
The Reséndiz case was featured in:

- People Magazine Presents… Surviving a serial killer, Season 1 Episode 2 (2024). Survivor Holly Dunn shares the story of her attack and the murder of Christopher Mainer.
- Catching Killers, "End of the Line: The Railroad Killer", Season 3 Episode 1 (2023).
- Texas True Crime, "The Railroad Killer: Inside massive manhunt for Angel Maturino Resendiz", ABC13 Houston (2022).
- Morbid: A True Crime Podcast, "The Unbelievable Survival Story of Holly K Dunn", Episode 266, and "The Railroad Killer", Episode 268 (2021).
- Dead Man Talking. A series of 16 podcasts released between October 2018 and February 2019 by British journalist Alex Hannaford and produced by Peter Sale for AudioBoom. Hannaford interviewed Reséndiz on tape in 2003 when Reséndiz said he had committed many more murders than those mentioned in his trial and that innocent people were in jail for his crimes.
- Murder She Solved, "Railway Killer", Season 2 Episode 5 (2011). The episode focuses on the murders of Wendy Von Huben and Jesse Howell.
- 48 Hours Mystery (CBS), "Live to Tell: The Railroad Killer", December 11, 2010 episode. Reséndiz was the focus of the episode in which Holly Dunn shared the story of her attack and the murder of Christopher Maier.
- I Survived, Season 1 Episode 6, LMN (2008). Survivor Holly Dunn shared the story of her attack and the murder of Christopher Maier.
- The FBI Files, "Tracks of a Killer", Biography Channel (2003).

== See also ==
- List of people executed in Texas, 2000–2009
- List of people executed in the United States in 2006
- List of serial killers by number of victims
- List of serial killers in the United States
