= Monster in My Family =

2015 television series

- Genre: Documentary
- Country of origin: United States
- Original language: English
- No. of seasons: 2
- No. of episodes: 10

Original release
- Network: Lifetime Movie Network
- Release: July 1, 2015 – January 24, 2017

Monster in My Family is a TV series produced by the Lifetime Movie Network that focuses on relatives of serial killers and their victims. The series has had two seasons.

== Production and release ==
The show's executive producers are Jennifer Wagman, Laura Fleury, Paninee Theeranuntawat, and Gary Tarpinian. Season 1 premiered on July 1, 2015 and had six episodes. Season 2 debuted in 2017 and ran for four episodes.

== Episodes ==
=== Season 1 ===
No.	Title	Original release date	U.S. viewers (millions)
1	"Happy Face Killer: Keith Jesperson"	July 1, 2015	N/A
2	"Spokane Serial Killer: Robert Lee Yates"	July 8, 2015	N/A
3	"Phoenix Serial Shooter: Dale Hausner"	July 15, 2015	N/A
4	"DC Sniper: John Allen Muhammad"	July 22, 2015	N/A
5	"Classified Ad Rapist: Bobby Joe Long"	July 29, 2015	N/A
6	"Killer Clown: John Wayne Gacy"	August 5, 2015	N/A

=== Season 2 ===
No.	Title	Original release date	U.S. viewers (millions)
1	"Drew Peterson"	January 3, 2017	N/A
2	"The Nightstalker: Richard Ramirez"	January 10, 2017	N/A
3	"Omar Mateen"	January 17, 2017	N/A
4	"Richard Beasley"	January 24, 2017	N/A
