= Clatskanie School District =

School district in Oregon, United States

Address
- 660 Southwest Bryant Street Clatskanie, Oregon, 97016; United States

District information
- Type: Public
- Grades: PreK–12
- NCES District ID: 4103260

Students and staff
- Students: 651 (2020–2021)
- Teachers: 35.06 (on an FTE basis)
- Staff: 68.01 (on an FTE basis)
- Student–teacher ratio: 18.57:1

Other information
- Website: www.csd.k12.or.us

The Clatskanie School District (6J) is a two-school public school district in Columbia County, Oregon, United States. It serves the city of Clatskanie and the surrounding area.

Within Columbia County, it includes Clatskanie. Within Clatsop County the district includes Westport.

== Demographics ==
In the 2009 school year, the district had six students classified as homeless by the Department of Education, or 0.7% of students in the district.

== Schools ==
- Clatskanie Elementary School (CES) serves kindergarten through sixth grade students
- Clatskanie Middle/High School (CMHS) combines middle school and high school and serves seventh grade through twelfth grade.

At one time, there was a middle school and a high school, but they have merged into one school. The mascot for CMHS is the tigers, CES's mascot is the cougars, the former CMS mascot was the eagles.
