= Richard Beasley (serial killer) =

American convicted serial killer on death row in Ohio

Richard James Beasley
- Undated mugshot of Beasley
- Born: June 15, 1959 (age 67); Washington, D.C., U.S.
- Status: Incarcerated on death row in Ohio
- Convictions: Aggravated murder (x3); Attempted murder Aggravated robbery Kidnapping; Weapon under disability (x5); Taking identity of another
- Penalty: Death

Details
- Victims: 3
- Date: August–November 2011
- Country: United States
- Location: Ohio
- Imprisoned at: Ross Correctional Institution

Richard James Beasley (born June 15, 1959), dubbed the Craigslist Killer, is an American convicted serial killer who was sentenced to death for the murders of three men in Ohio. From August to November 2011, Beasley and his teenage accomplice Brogan Rafferty conspired with each other to lure victims with fake promises of job offers advertised online in Craigslist, which led to the deaths of three men: David Pauley, Timothy Kern and Ralph Geiger. A fourth victim was wounded but managed to escape, which brought the murders to light.

Beasley, who was deemed the mastermind of the murders, was found guilty of three counts of aggravated murder and one count of attempted murder, and was sentenced to death on April 4, 2013. Rafferty, who was 16 at the time of the killings, was spared the death sentence and instead sentenced to life in prison in November 2012. Beasley is currently on death row awaiting execution at the Ross Correctional Institution.

== Early life ==
Richard James Beasley was born in Washington, D.C. on June 15, 1959. Several weeks after he was born, Beasley's family relocated to Akron, Ohio, where Beasley grew up. Beasley's parents divorced when he was young, and his mother, a secretary working at a local high school, remarried to a truck driver in 1963. According to his mother, Beasley's stepfather was an alcoholic who often physically abused his stepson, and sometimes, Beasley and his two half-sisters (fathered by his stepfather) were sent to live with relatives to avoid the abuse. Apart from this, Beasley was also frequently a victim of sexual assaults by neighbourhood youngsters in his childhood.

Beasley graduated from Buchtel High School in 1976 and enrolled in trade-school courses to become a machinist. Beasley was married at one point and had a daughter, but his marriage ended with a divorce. Prior to his 2011 murder spree, Beasley had several run-ins with the law. He was first convicted of daytime burglary in Texas in 1983, and spent four years in prison before he was released on parole. In 1998, Beasley was convicted of federal charges of firearm possession, and served a six-year sentence in federal prison before he was paroled in 2004.

== Murders ==
From August to November 2011, Richard Beasley committed a total of three murders, which were dubbed the "Craigslist murders" by the media.

Together with his 16-year-old accomplice Brogan Rafferty (born December 24, 1994), Beasley hatched a plan to lure men with fake promises of job offers advertised online through Craigslist, and to kill them. Rafferty and Beasley would go on to post a fake job offer, seeking to hire farmhands or caretakers to work on a 680-acre ranch owned by Beasley in rural Ohio. The first victim, 56-year-old Ralph Geiger, a resident of Akron who was homeless and used to own a construction business, was the first to respond to the job calling, and contacted Beasley in August 2011. Geiger met up with both Rafferty and Beasley that same month, and after leaving a motel and arriving at the purported farm property, Geiger was shot to death by Beasley and buried in a shallow grave. Geiger's identity was also stolen by Beasley in order to commit more murders under his fake job offer scheme.

Two months after Geiger's murder, in October 2011, 51-year-old David Pauley became the second victim to be killed by Beasley and Rafferty. Pauley, who lived in Norfolk, Virginia, responded to the fake job offer to be a farm caretaker, and 13 days later, he packed his bags and left for Ohio in his personal pickup truck for his new job. Pauley met both Rafferty and Beasley for breakfast before he followed the two men to the same forest where Geiger was killed. After parting ways with Rafferty, Beasley murdered Pauley by shooting and buried the body in a shallow grave dug earlier by Rafferty (who joined in the disposal of Pauley's corpse).

A month later, on November 6, 2011, 48-year-old Scott Davis, a self-employed landscaper, travelled from South Carolina to Ohio after agreeing to Beasley's job offer, which included the promise of a $300 weekly salary and free housing as a farm caretaker; Davis reportedly took up the offer due to his desire to return to Ohio and live nearer to his mother. After meeting up with Rafferty and Beasley (who used the fake alias "Jack"), Davis was brought to his reputed new workplace, but as he walked in front of Beasley in the area, Davis heard the click of a gun and witnessed Beasley trying to shoot him. Despite being shot in the arm once, Davis escaped and went into hiding, and managed to survive. He later sought help from a nearby house and was taken to a hospital for treatment.

Several days after the attempted murder of Davis and his escape, both Beasley and Rafferty continued their killing spree and thus claimed their third victim that same month. The victim in question was 47-year-old Timothy Kern, a divorced father of three sons. Kern, who used to work part time at a gas station and often lived in his car or a friend's house, responded to the online job offer and on November 9, 2011, Kern was driven for an interview with Beasley by his son, and he was last seen by his son on November 13, 2011. According to the confession of Rafferty to the police, Kern met up with Beasley and Rafferty in the parking lot of a pizza shop in Canton and Kern was lured to a shallow grave dug by Rafferty in the nearby woods, where he was shot to death and buried in the same grave.

== Trial and sentencing ==
=== Arrest and charges ===
Through the investigations of Scott Davis's attempted murder, as well as receiving a missing persons report from David Pauley's twin sister (who had not seen her brother since October 22, 2011), the police were able to uncover the serial murders committed by Brogan Rafferty and Richard Beasley, who were both arrested for the homicides.

Beasley, alongside Rafferty, was charged with multiple counts of aggravated murder, kidnapping and aggravated robbery and other offences related to the serial killings. Beasley was formally indicted by a grand jury on January 20, 2012. Five days after his indictment, Beasley officially entered a plea of not guilty to all the charges against him.

=== Conviction and sentence of Beasley ===
More than a year after his arrest, Richard Beasley stood trial on February 26, 2013, for the murders of Ralph Geiger, David Pauley and Timothy Kern. During the trial itself, the prosecution sought to prove that Beasley intentionally hatched the murder plot by luring victims who were down on their luck and desperate to turn their lives around with the fake promise of new jobs. In her opening address to court, special prosecutor Emily Pelphrey admonished Beasley as a "false prophet" for falsely giving his victims "a message of hope and change and a new start in life" and took advantage of their situation in his killing spree. The sole survivor, Scott Davis, also testified against Beasley, recounting how he was attacked by Beasley and how he'd escaped.

On March 12, 2013, the jury found Beasley guilty of 26 counts, including aggravated murder, kidnapping, aggravated robbery, and other charges. For the most serious charge of aggravated murder, the punishment was either life imprisonment or the death penalty under Ohio state law.

During submissions on sentence, the prosecution, led by Jonathan Baumoel, sought the death penalty, stating that the crimes committed by Beasley was "the worst of the worst," and urged the jury to consider the "enormous" magnitude and weight of the crimes based on its aggravating factors. On the other hand, the defense sought life imprisonment, and called on a psychiatrist, John Fabian, to support the notion that due to Beasley's troubled childhood, he suffered from depression, low self-esteem, and feelings of isolation, and also resorted to alcohol abuse. Beasley's mother also made an emotional plea in court for her son's life to be spared, and stated that her son had suffered from both abuse from her second husband and sexual abuse from older children in their neighborhood when he was young.

On March 21, 2013, the jury unanimously recommended the death penalty for the deaths of all the three Craigslist murder victims. An official sentencing hearing was originally scheduled to take place on March 26, 2013, before it was postponed to April 4, 2013.

On April 4, 2013, Beasley was formally sentenced to death by Summit County Common Pleas Judge Lynne Callahan. In her comment on Beasley's three death sentences, Prosecutor Sherri Bevan Walsh stated that Beasley was a "cold-blooded manipulator with zero regard for human life", and he also never showed remorse for his actions. She added that while it was never a happy occasion to condemn a person to death row, it was the "most appropriate sentence" for Beasley.

During the sentencing hearing, victim impact statements were made by the victims' families and the surviving victim Scott Davis. Davis told the court that he was grateful to be alive and thanked the judge for sentencing Beasley to death, denouncing Beasley as a beast and addressed the families of the murder victims that none of the three men deserved to meet such brutal ends. The twin sister of one of the deceased victims, David Pauley, told the defendant that he had taken away her "best friend, confidant and (her) twin", and expressed rebuff at Beasley's own claims as a preacher or chaplain, stating that "no true man of God would take lives".

=== Fate of Brogan Rafferty ===
The murder trial of Beasley's accomplice, Brogan Rafferty, was held before Beasley's. Rafferty was found guilty of three counts of aggravated murder and one count of attempted murder on October 31, 2012.

The following month, on November 9, 2012, Rafferty was sentenced to life without parole by Summit County Common Pleas Judge Lynne Callahan. Given the fact that Rafferty was below 18 at the time of the murders, he was ineligible for the death sentence and the only possible sentence was life imprisonment. Prior to his sentencing, the defence and Rafferty had twice corresponded with the prosecution to make a sentencing deal to allow Rafferty seek parole after 26 years (first attempt) or 30 years (second attempt), but the agreement fell through for unknown reasons.

In April 2015, the Ohio 9th District Court of Appeals rejected Rafferty's appeal for a lower sentence, after the court rejected the defence's arguments that it was unconstitutional and contrary to law to impose a life sentence without parole for Rafferty.

In November 2021, after new changes to the law, it was reported that Rafferty will become eligible for parole after a minimum of 25 years, with his earliest parole hearing set to be in November 2036. As of 2025, Rafferty is incarcerated at the Northeast Ohio Correctional Center.

== Death row and appeals ==
Since his sentencing, Richard Beasley is incarcerated on death row at the Ross Correctional Institution. His execution date is yet to be set as of 2026.

Throughout his incarceration, Beasley appealed against his death sentence several times.

On September 20, 2017, Beasley appealed to the Ohio Supreme Court, seeking to overturn his death sentence on the basis that he was denied a fair trial. On February 9, 2018, the Ohio Supreme Court rejected Beasley's appeal. On May 9, 2018, another appeal to the Ohio Supreme Court was also rejected, and Beasley's lawyers confirmed they would appeal to the U.S. Supreme Court.

On January 7, 2019, the U.S. Supreme Court dismissed Beasley's appeal.

On January 6, 2020, the Ohio Supreme Court once again upheld Beasley's death sentences and rejected his second appeal. However, the court vacated his jail sentences for the lesser charges and remanded the case back to the lower courts for re-sentencing, after they found that the trial judge committed a procedural error when he imposed multiple consecutive jail sentences for Beasley's non-capital charges.

On September 23, 2020, at the end of his re-sentencing hearing, Beasley was again sentenced to the same jail terms, all to be served consecutively, for the non-capital charges against him.

== In popular media ==
The case of Richard Beasley was featured in several true crime documentaries. One of them was the 2017 documentary Monster in My Family, and the series's last episode featured an interview of Beasley's daughter, who talked about the struggles of coming to terms with her father's murderous acts. Another was the 2022 docuseries I Survived a Serial Killer, which featured an episode of Beasley's crimes, with the sole survivor of the Craigslist killings, Scott Davis, recounting how he survived his encounter with Beasley.

== See also ==
- Internet homicide
- Capital punishment in Ohio
- List of death row inmates in the United States § Ohio
- List of serial killers in the United States
