= Keith Hunter Jesperson =

Canadian-American serial killer (born 1955)

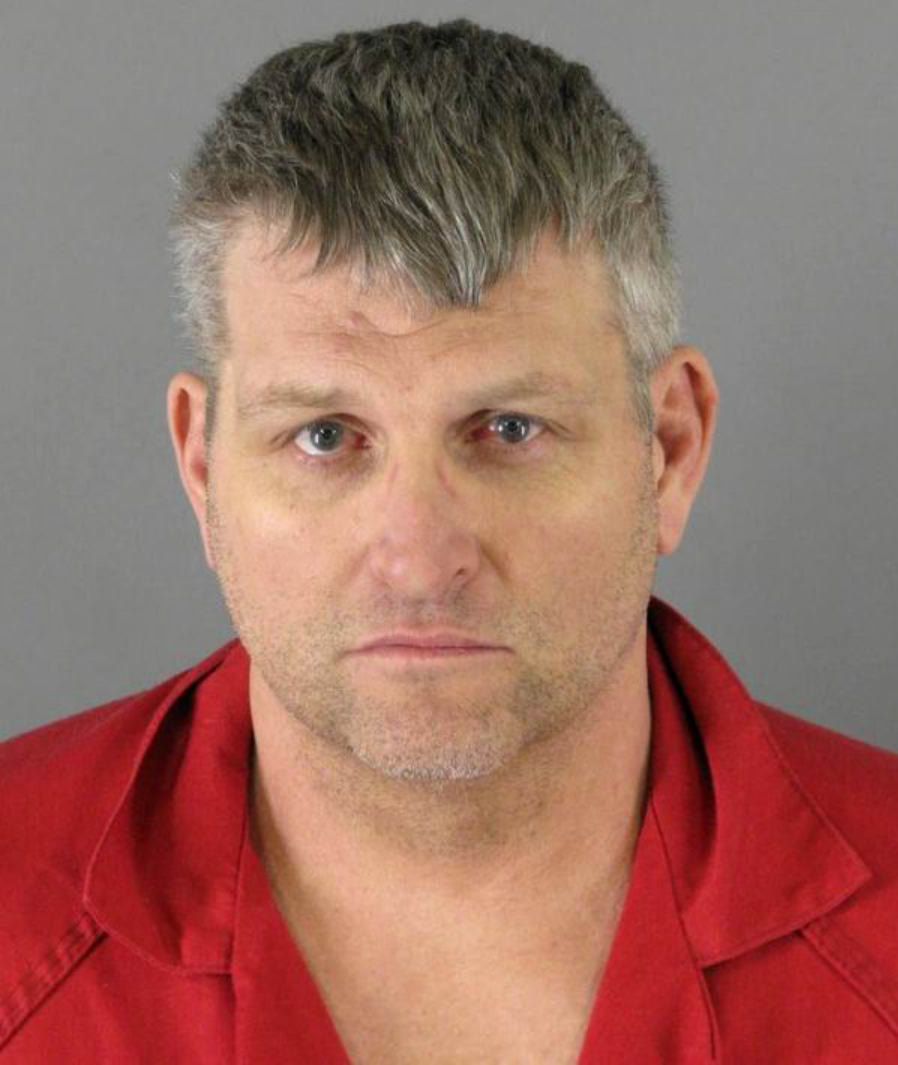
- Mug shot of Jesperson in 2009
- Born: 6 April 1955 (age 71); Chilliwack, British Columbia, Canada
- Other name: The Happy Face Killer
- Height: 1.98 m (6 ft 6 in)
- Spouse: Rose Hucke (m. 1975; div. 1990)
- Children: 3, including Melissa Moore
- Convictions: Aggravated murder Murder
- Penalty: Life imprisonment

Details
- Victims: 8 confirmed (confessed to as many as 160)
- Span of crimes: 21 January 1990 – 16 March 1995
- Country: U.S., Canada
- States: California, Florida, Nebraska, Oregon, Washington, Wyoming
- Date apprehended: 30 March 1995
- Imprisoned at: Oregon State Penitentiary

Keith Hunter Jesperson (born 6 April 1955) is an American-Canadian serial killer known as the Happy Face Killer. He worked as a truck driver and murdered at least eight women between January 1990 and March 1995, later mailing many taunting letters to the media and authorities that he marked with smiley faces. Many of Jesperson's victims were sex workers and transients, whom he preferred to kill via strangulation.

After the body of Jesperson's first victim, Taunja Bennett, was found, media attention surrounded Laverne Pavlinac, a woman who falsely confessed to Bennett's murder with the help of her abusive boyfriend, John Sosnovske. Upset that he was not getting any media attention, Jesperson drew a smiley face on a bathroom wall a significant distance from the scene of the Bennett killing, and wrote an anonymous letter confessing to the murder, providing proof. When that did not elicit a response, he began writing letters to the media and authorities.

Jesperson's last murder was the crime that ultimately led to his capture. While he has claimed to have killed as many as 160 people, only eight murders have been confirmed. Jesperson is currently serving a life sentence at the Oregon State Penitentiary. He will not be eligible for parole until 2063.

Jesperson's daughter, Melissa, wrote a 2009 memoir, Shattered Silence, about growing up with a serial killer as a father. In 2018, she adapted her book into a podcast entitled Happy Face: A Family of Monsters, which formed the basis of a TV adaptation.

== Early life ==
Keith Jesperson was born on April 6, 1955, to Leslie "Les" Samuel and Gladys Lorraine Jesperson (née Bellamy) in Chilliwack, British Columbia, Canada, the middle child with two older brothers and two younger sisters. His father was a domineering alcoholic; according to Jesperson, his paternal grandfather was prone to violence. Jesperson's father denied being an abusive parent; however, other family members corroborated the abuse claims to author Jack Olsen.

Jesperson was the black sheep of his family, and he was teased by other children for his large size. After moving to Selah, Washington, he had trouble fitting in and making friends, again because of his large size. Jesperson's brothers did not help or sympathize with him; instead they nicknamed him "Igor" or "Ig", a name that stuck throughout his school years. Because of this, Jesperson was a shy child, content to play by himself much of the time. He would often get into trouble for misbehaving, sometimes violently, and would be severely punished by his father. This included beatings, sometimes with a belt in front of others, and in one case he received an electric shock.

At a very early age—as young as five—Jesperson would capture and torture animals. He enjoyed watching animals kill each other as well as the feeling he got from taking their lives. This continued as he grew older. Jesperson would capture birds and strays around the trailer park where he lived with his family, severely beating the animals and then strangling them to death, something for which he claims his father was proud of him. In the years following, Jesperson said he often thought about what it would be like to do the same to a human being.

That desire manifested in three attempted murders. The first occurred when Jesperson was around age 10, when he was friends with a boy named Martin. The two would often get into trouble together, and Jesperson claimed he was often punished many times for things Martin had done. This led Jesperson to violently attack Martin until his father pulled him away. He later claimed his intention was to kill the boy. Approximately one year later, Jesperson was swimming in a lake when another boy held him underwater until he blacked out. Sometime later, at a public pool, Jesperson attempted to drown the boy by holding his head under the water until a lifeguard pulled him away.

Jesperson reported that he was raped at age 14. He graduated from high school in 1973, but did not attend college because his father did not believe he could do it. Although Jesperson was unsuccessful with girls in high school, having never even attended a school dance or his prom, he did enter into a relationship after graduating. In 1975, when Jesperson was aged 20, he married Rose Hucke, and the couple had three children, two daughters and a son. Jesperson worked as a truck driver to support his family.

Several years later, Hucke began to suspect Jesperson was having affairs when strange women would call. Tension in the marriage increased, and after 14 years, while Jesperson was on the road, Hucke packed up her children and belongings and drove 320 km (200 mi) to live with her parents in Spokane, Washington. Jesperson continued to spend time with his children when he was in town. The couple divorced in 1990.

At age 35, standing 2.02 m (6 ft 8 in) and weighing approximately 115 kg (255 lb), Jesperson began working toward the goal of joining the Royal Canadian Mounted Police (RCMP), but an injury suffered while training ended this endeavor. He then sought work again as a truck driver after relocating to Cheney, Washington. Jesperson soon realized that this job afforded him the opportunity to kill without being suspected.

== Victims ==
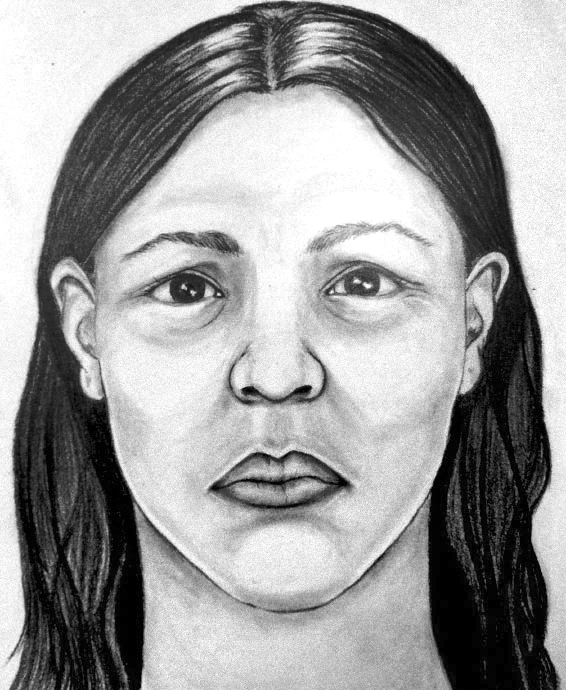
Facial reconstruction of the unidentified woman found in 1993, who, Jesperson stated, was named "Carla". She was identified as 45-year-old Patricia Skiple in 2022.

Jesperson's first known victim was Taunja Bennett on 21 January 1990, near Portland, Oregon, United States. He introduced himself to Bennett at a bar and invited her to a house he was renting. After getting into an argument with Bennett, he strangled her to death with his hands and disposed of her body.

On 30 August 1992, the body of a woman Jesperson had raped and strangled was found near Blythe, California, United States. Jesperson gave the Jane Doe's name as Claudia. Later genetic genealogical research eventually identified her as Lydia Jane Wade McWhorter, who was missing from Texas.

A month later, in Turlock, California, the body of Cynthia Lyn Rose was discovered. Jesperson claims Rose was a sex worker who entered his truck at a truck stop while he slept. His fourth victim was another sex worker, Laurie Ann Pentland of Salem, Oregon, whose body was found in November 1992. According to Jesperson, Pentland attempted to double the fee she charged for the sex he had been engaged in with her. She threatened to call the police, and he strangled her.

Jesperson killed his next victim in June 1993 in Santa Nella, California. She was a previously unidentified woman named Patricia Skiple, who, he claimed, was named "Carla" or "Cindy". Police originally considered her death a drug overdose. In September 1994, another Jane Doe was found in Crestview, Florida. Jesperson had previously said that her name was Suzanne, and she was identified as Suzanne L. Kjellenberg on 3 October 2023. Jesperson's seventh victim was Angela Subrize, 21, who was killed in Cheyenne, Wyoming, on 27 January 1995.

Jesperson was arrested on 30 March 1995 for the murder of Julie Winningham, who was killed near Washougal, Washington. He had been questioned by police a week before, but they had no grounds to arrest him after he refused to talk. In the days following, Jesperson decided that he was certainly going to be arrested, and after two suicide attempts turned himself in hoping it would result in leniency during his sentencing. While in custody, Jesperson began revealing details of his killings and making claims of many others, most of which he later recanted. A few days before his arrest, he wrote a letter to his brother in which he confessed to having killed eight people over the course of five years. This led police agencies in several states to reopen old cases, many of which were found to be possible victims of Jesperson.

Although Jesperson at one point claimed to have had as many as 160 victims, only the eight women killed in the US-states of Washington, Oregon, California, Florida, Nebraska, and Wyoming have been confirmed. He is serving three consecutive life sentences at the Oregon State Penitentiary in Salem. In September 2009, Jesperson was indicted in Riverside County, California, on murder charges; he was extradited in December 2009. He was convicted of another murder and received a fourth life sentence in January 2010.

== Laverne Pavlinac ==
Early in the investigation of Bennett's murder, Laverne Pavlinac read the news reports surrounding Bennett's death, and saw it as an opportunity to force an end to the long-term abusive relationship she had been in with her live-in boyfriend, John Sosnovske. Pavlinac set up a meeting with investigators and gave a false confession, using the details she had read in the newspaper to give a detailed story of how Sosnovske forced her to help him rape, murder, and dispose of Bennett's body. Pavlinac and Sosnovske were both arrested on 5 March 1990 and both were convicted of the murder on 8 February 1991. To avoid the possibility of facing the death penalty, Sosnovske pleaded no contest. He was sentenced to life in prison, while Pavlinac was sentenced to no less than ten years, much more than she had anticipated. Pavlinac soon admitted to making up her entire story, but her claims were ignored.

On 7 January 1996, almost five years after their conviction, Pavlinac and Sosnovske were released from prison after Jesperson and his attorney offered his confession with convincing evidence of his guilt. He had given police officers the location of the victim's purse. The purse had not been found at the crime scene, and its location was considered information only the killer would know.

== "Happy Face Killer" ==
Following Bennett's murder, as all the attention was going to Pavlinac and Sosnovske, Jesperson wrote a confession on the bathroom wall of a truck stop and signed it with a smiley face. When that did not create the attention he desired, he wrote letters to media outlets and police departments confessing to his murders, starting with a six-page letter to The Oregonian in which he revealed the details of his killings. Jesperson signed each letter with a smiley face. This led Phil Stanford, the journalist working the story for The Oregonian, to dub Jesperson "The Happy Face Killer".

== Jesperson's daughter ==
In November 2008, Jesperson's daughter, Melissa G. Moore, appeared on the Dr. Phil show to talk about her father. In March 2018, she was featured in an episode, titled "Put on a Happy Face", of the Investigation Discovery true crime series Evil Lives Here. She was also featured on an episode of The Oprah Winfrey Show, in the Lifetime Movies network series Monster in My Family, and in a 20/20 special on ABC.

In 2008, Moore published a book titled Shattered Silence: The Untold Story of a Serial Killer's Daughter. She recounts living with Jesperson until her parents' 1990 divorce, and noticing how her father was different when she was in elementary school. Their house bordered an apple orchard, and Jesperson killed stray cats and gophers that wandered nearby. One day, she watched, horrified, as he hanged stray kittens from the family's clothesline. She ran to get her mother, and when they returned, the kittens were dead on the ground. He had watched and laughed as the kittens clawed each other to escape, and then he killed them. In November 2014, she wrote an article about her father for the BBC. She was also a correspondent for Crime Watch Daily.

In September 2018, podcast network HowStuffWorks began releasing a show called Happy Face featuring interviews with Moore about her childhood and her father. The series had 12 episodes. In June 2021, a trailer appeared on iTunes for a new true crime podcast called Life After Happy Face, to be hosted by Moore and forensic criminologist Laura Pettler. The episode was released on 9 July 2021. An eight episode TV series, Happy Face, based on Moore's podcast, premiered on Paramount+ on 20 March 2025, starring Dennis Quaid as Jesperson.

== See also ==
- List of serial killers in the United States
- List of serial killers by number of victims
