= Oregon Cultural Heritage Commission =

U.S. nonprofit heritage organization

- Founded: 1988
- Type: Non-profit organization
- Legal status: 501(c)(3)
- Purpose: Literary and cultural history
- Location: Portland, Oregon
- Region served: Oregon
- Method: Publications and public events
- Key people: David Milholland (president)
- Website: ochcom.org

The Oregon Cultural Heritage Commission (OCHC) is a non-profit organization based in the U.S. state of Oregon. The commission was formed in 1988 in order to discover and commemorate important literary and cultural contributions to Oregon's history. The group does this through publications and other media, memorials, and public events.

== History ==
The Oregon Cultural Heritage Commission was founded in 1988 by Brian Booth and David Milholland. In July 1990, Portland mayor Bud Clark gave the group a boost by announcing the commission in a formal declaration. The organization was granted non-profit status in 1993.

The commission's first project was announced in October 1990. The project raised money for a statue dedicated to poet and journalist, John Reed, to be erected in Portland.

In 1998, three volunteers from the commission went to Paris to find the grave of former Portland resident Louise Bryant, which they discovered was crumbling, undated, and scheduled for removal. Through the commission's efforts as well as donations, including some from relatives of Bryant and her last husband, William Christian Bullitt, Jr., the grave was restored.

Among the projects the group has helped sponsor is The Oregon Encyclopedia.

== The 100 Oregon Books ==
In 2005, OCHC compiled "The 100 Oregon Books", a list of books published between 1800 and 2000 that exemplify Oregon's literary heritage. The list was created as part of the centennial celebration of the Oregon State Library.
