= Marshland, Oregon =

Unincorporated community in the state of Oregon, United States

- Unincorporated community
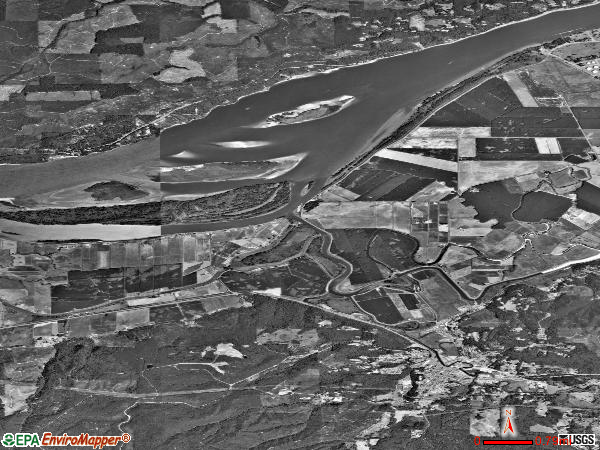
- An aerial view of Marshland

- Location within Oregon Location within the United States
- Coordinates: 46.111°N 123.286°W
- Country: United States
- State: Oregon
- County: Columbia
- Elevation: 53 ft (16 m)
- Time zone: UTC-8 (Pacific (PST))
  - Summer (DST): UTC-7 (PDT)

Marshland, formerly known as Skunk Cabbage Flat, is an unincorporated community in Columbia County, Oregon, United States. It was settled by Z.B. Bryant in 1862. Its post office was established around 1873. It closed in 1960.
