= Clatskanie Middle/High School =

Public school in Clatskanie, Oregon, United States

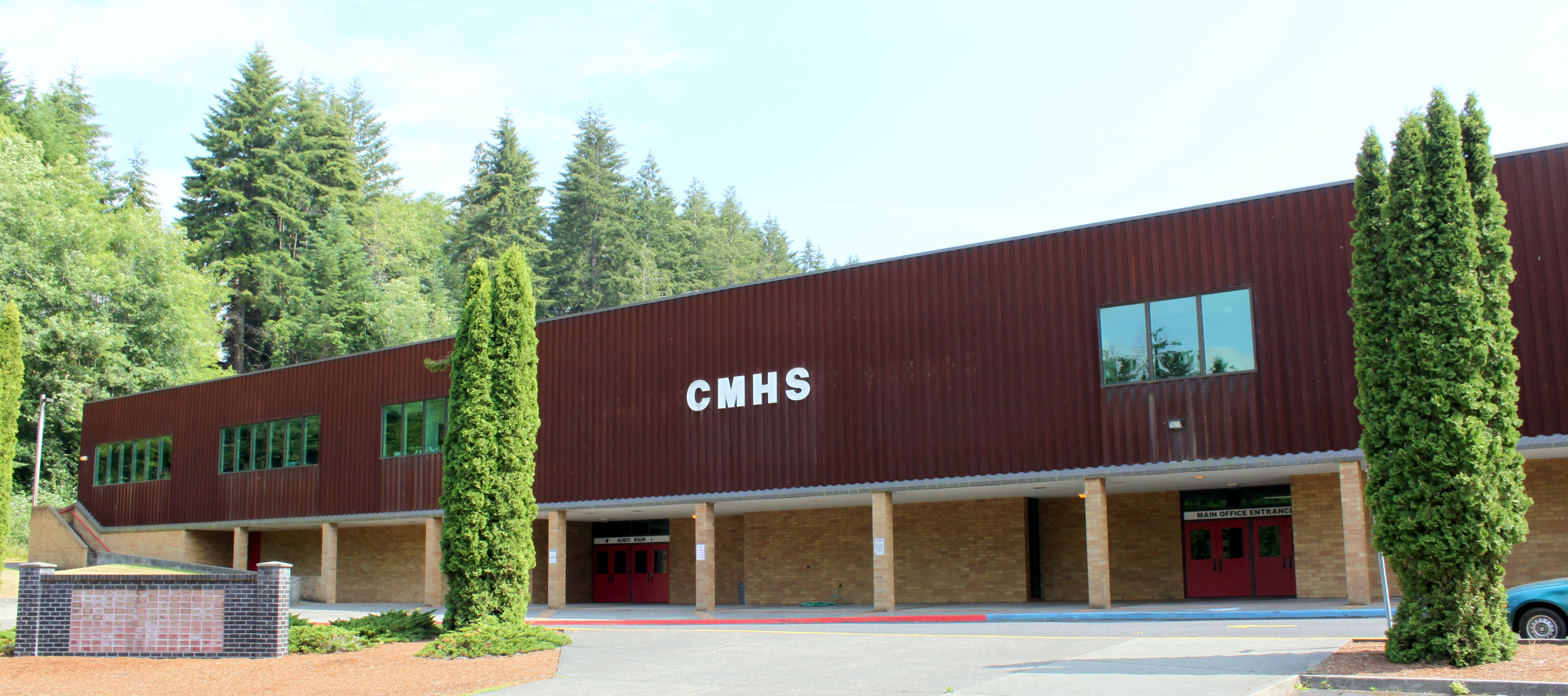

Location
- 471 SW Bel Air Drive; Clatskanie, (Columbia), Oregon 97016; United States; 46.101°N 123.211°W

Information
- Type: Public
- School district: Clatskanie School District
- Principal: Jim Helmen
- Grades: 7-12
- Enrollment: 279 (2023-2024)
- Colors: Red, white, and black
- Athletics conference: OSAA Lewis & Clark League 3A-1
- Mascot: Tiger
- Website: Clatskanie Middle/High School

Clatskanie Middle/High School is a public school in Clatskanie, Oregon, United States that serves both middle school- and high school-age students. It is a part of the Clatskanie School District.

The district's boundary includes Clatskanie in Columbia County, and Westport in Clatsop County.

The current building opened in 1978 and now houses 462 students. Known as the Tigers, teams from the school compete at the 3A level in the Lewis & Clark League of the Oregon School Activities Association (OSAA).

== History ==
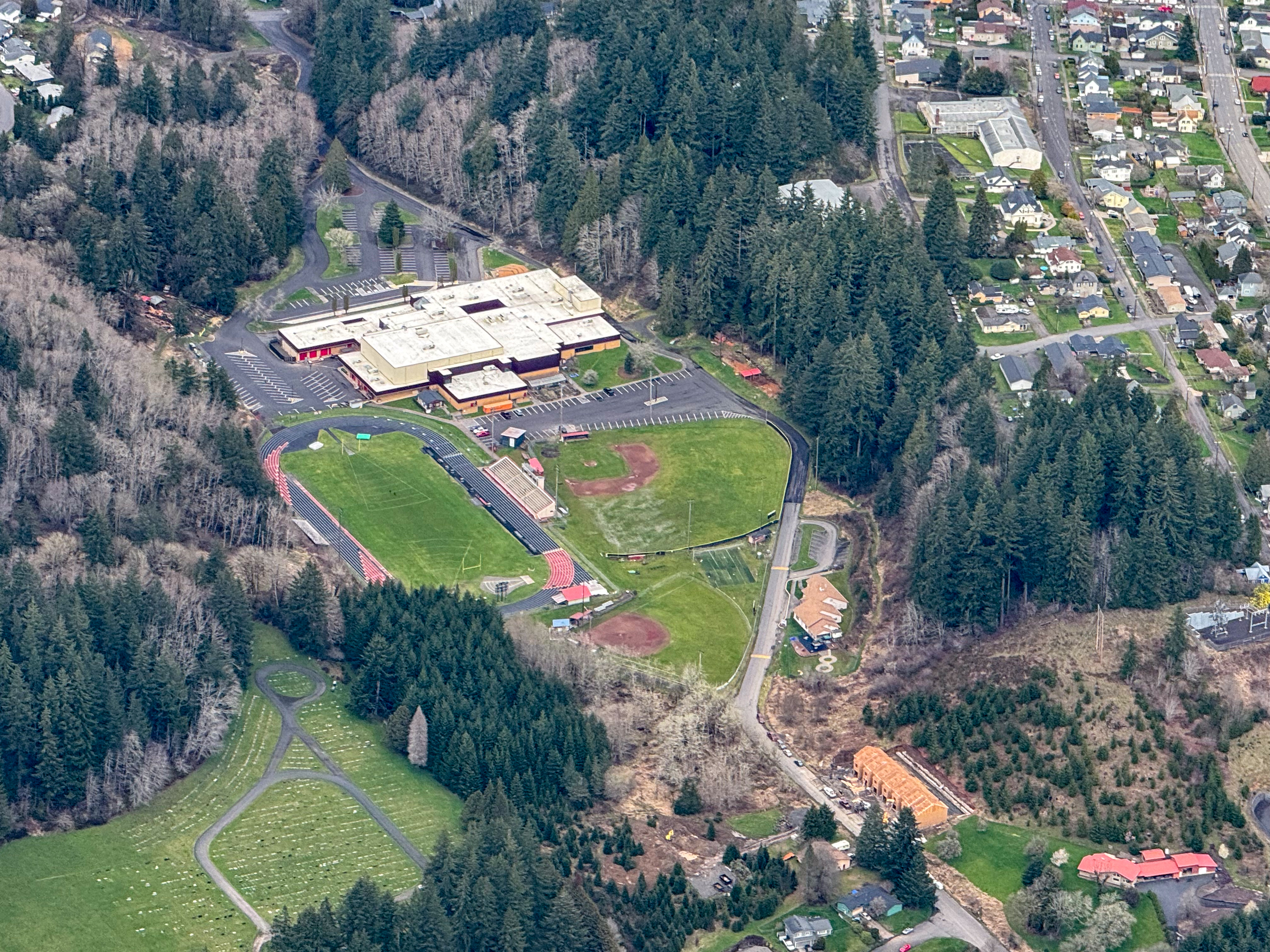
Aerial view of the school

The high school has been used as a Red Cross shelter during floods.

The building was originally used to house grades 9 through 12 only. In 1998, Clatskanie Middle School was closed and the school was renamed Clatskanie Middle/High School and contained grades 6 through 12.

=== Food drive ===
In 1991, a student created the "Help Hungry Kids – Clatskanie High School Challenge" which organized all high schools in Oregon in a food drive. Awards to the top high schools were presented at the spring Oregon Student Council Convention, and over 58,300 pounds (26,400 kg) of food were collected. The student was awarded the Young American Medal for Service in 1991, which was awarded by President Bill Clinton in the East Room of the White House. She also received the "Stone Soup Award" from the Oregon Food Bank and the Tom McCall Great Kids Award.

The school was recognized by The New York Times in 1997 for participation in the National Association of Secondary School Principals "Help Hungry Students" food drive, part of an effort to include civil education in schools.

=== First Amendment lawsuit ===
In 2001, the majority of players on the varsity boys' basketball team requested via a petition that their coach quit the team. The coach refused to resign, eight players refused to take the bus to an away game that day, and the coach then suspended those players who had signed the petition. Eight players filed a lawsuit in 2003 against the basketball coach, the school district, the athletic director, the district superintendent, and the school principal, claiming the coach had infringed on their First Amendment right to free speech by "suspending them in retaliation for speaking out against the coach." The players sued under the Civil Rights Act of 1871 and lost on summary judgment at the trial court in 2004.

On appeal in 2006, the Ninth Circuit Court of Appeals affirmed the summary judgment in favor of the school district for the actions related to the refusal to get onto the bus, as this disruptive action was not protected speech. The court reversed the judgment that had been in favor of the school district concerning the actions in response to the student's petition, as the trial court had used the wrong standard to analyze the speech, remanding that part of the case back to the trial court. On remand, the trial court determined that the district was not entitled to summary judgment and allowed the case to proceed to trial on the actions surrounding the petition. The coach in question, Jeff Baughman, now serves as the school's principal.

=== Civil rights and "sextortion" lawsuit ===
In 2013, three female former students of the school sued the district and principal Jeff Baughman for violations of their civil right to an education by creating a culture of "sextortion," bullying, and sexual discrimination. The suit claimed that school officials were aware of activities by male students to coerce female students into providing nude photos of themselves to the boys, that they allowed male students to access the girl's locker room, and that they did not respond to complaints of harassment by the girls and their parents. The lawsuit was settled in April 2015.

== Academics ==
In the 2007-2008 school year, Clatskanie did not meet the Adequate Yearly Progress rating on standardized testing. It received an "exceptional" testing participation rating, a "satisfactory" academic achievement rating, a "declined" rating for improvement assessments, attendance, and dropout, and a "low" rating for attendance and dropout rates, with a 2007-2008 attendance rate of 89.4% and a 2006-2007 dropout rate of 9.6%.

The Oregon Department of Education's annual report card for 2008 rated the school as "satisfactory" for student performance, "low" for student behavior, "declined" for improvement rating, and "satisfactory" for overall performance.

In 2008, 56% of the school's seniors received a high school diploma. Of 77 students, 43 graduated, 28 dropped out, one received a modified diploma, and five were still in high school the following year.

Clatskanie Middle/High School offers four opportunities for college credit through Clatsop Community College.

== Athletics ==
Clatskanie's high school athletic teams compete at the 3A level in the Oregon School Activities Association. Named as the Tigers with the colors of red, white and black, teams are in the Lewis & Clark League for most sports. The school fields teams in boys' and girls' cross country, basketball, and track and field. Other sports include football, baseball, softball, girls' soccer, volleyball, and wrestling.

Clatskanie also participates in solo, band, and choir with the OSAA.
