= Clatskanie, Oregon =

- City
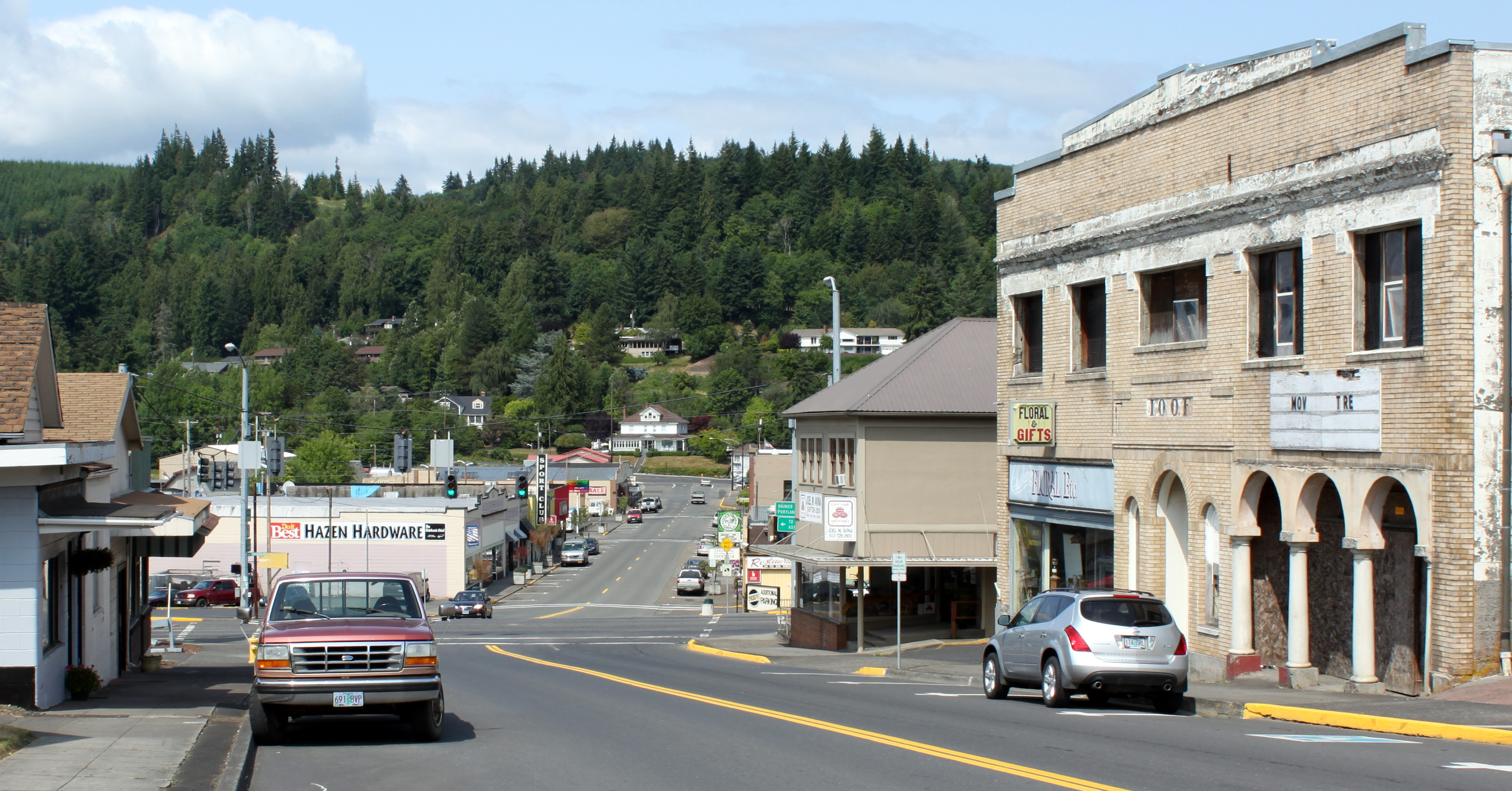
- Downtown Clatskanie

- Location in Oregon
- Coordinates: 46°06′17″N 123°12′16″W
- Country: United States
- State: Oregon
- County: Columbia
- Incorporated: 1891

Government
  - Mayor: Bob Brajcich

Area
  - Total: 1.30 sq mi (3.36 km^{2})
  - Land: 1.30 sq mi (3.36 km^{2})
  - Water: 0 sq mi (0.00 km^{2})
- Elevation: 23 ft (7.0 m)

Population (2020)
  - Total: 1,716
  - Density: 1,324.3/sq mi (511.32/km^{2})
- Time zone: UTC-8 (Pacific)
  - Summer (DST): UTC-7 (Pacific)
- ZIP code: 97016
- Area codes: 503 and 971
- FIPS code: 41-13750
- GNIS feature ID: 2409472
- Website: www.cityofclatskanie.com

Clatskanie (/ˈklætskɪnaɪ/) is a city in Columbia County, Oregon, United States. It was named for the Tlatskanai Native American people, and the Clatskanie River which flows through the town and empties into the Columbia River about four miles to the north. As of the 2020 census, Clatskanie had a population of 1,716.

== History ==
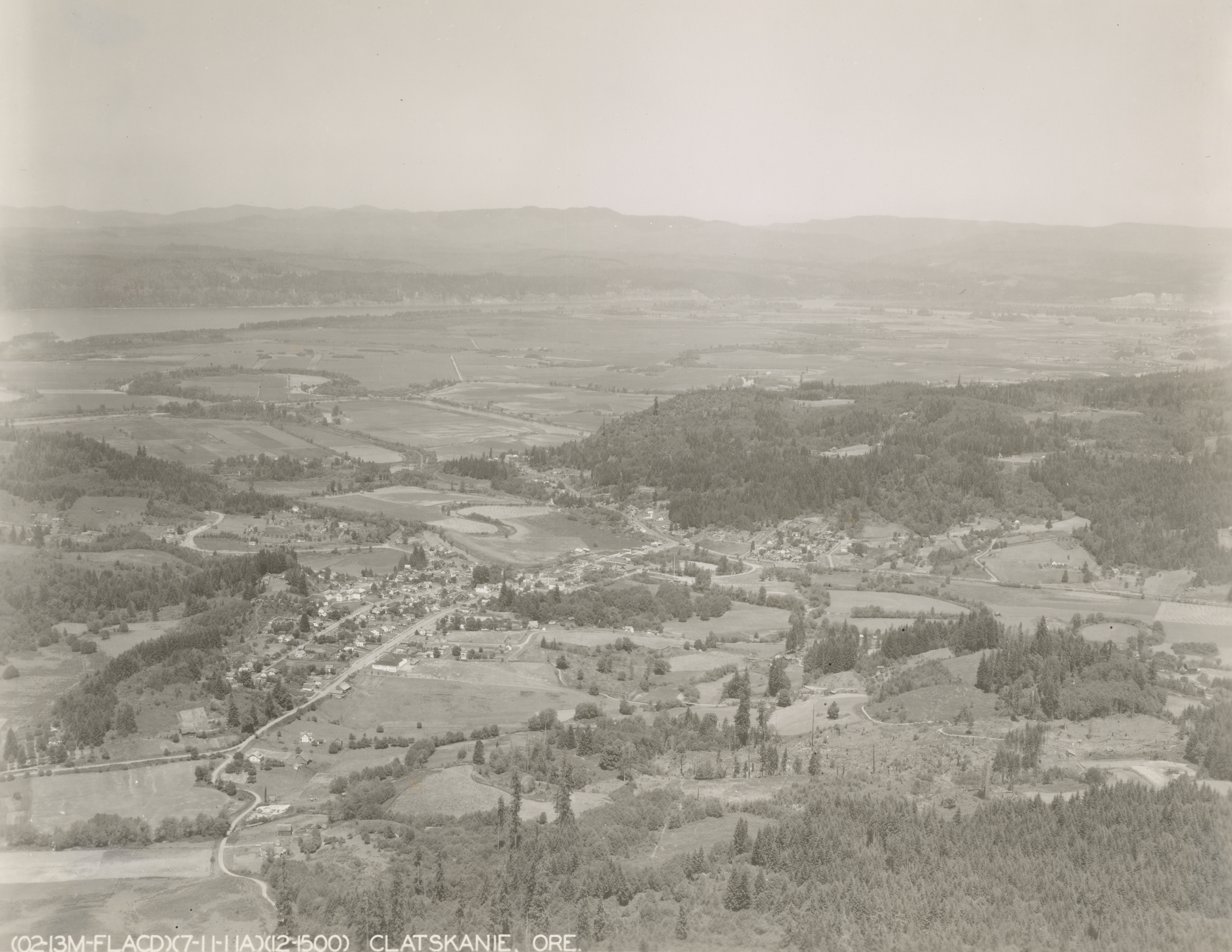
Clatskanie in 1933

The town was originally called Bryantville after the large family who were among the first filers of Donation Land Claims in the area in 1852–1853. However, the first postmaster, Enoch Conyers, who was married to one of the Bryant daughters, changed the name to Clatskanie after the Tlatskanai Native American tribe.

According to the Clatsop County pioneer Silas B. Smith, Tlatskanai was a point in the Nehalem River that was reached from the Columbia River by way of the Youngs River or by way of the Clatskanie River. The native inhabitants, who were not in the habit of naming streams, did not use the word Tlatskanai for the streams they would follow in order to get to that point, but the white men who settled here later did apply the name to the streams.

Many of Clatskanie's inhabitants are of Nordic heritage, specifically Finnish, Swedish, and Norwegian.

== Geography ==
According to the United States Census Bureau, the city has a total area of 1.19 square miles (3.08 km^{2}), all of it land.

=== Climate ===
According to the Köppen Climate Classification system, Clatskanie has a warm-summer Mediterranean climate, abbreviated "Csb" on climate maps.

Climate data for Clatskanie (1991–2020 normals, extremes 1935–present)
Month	Jan	Feb	Mar	Apr	May	Jun	Jul	Aug	Sep	Oct	Nov	Dec	Year
Record high °F (°C)	62 (17)	72 (22)	81 (27)	89 (32)	94 (34)	103 (39)	103 (39)	103 (39)	100 (38)	88 (31)	72 (22)	64 (18)	103 (39)
Mean daily maximum °F (°C)	46.6 (8.1)	50.3 (10.2)	54.5 (12.5)	58.8 (14.9)	64.8 (18.2)	68.8 (20.4)	74.7 (23.7)	75.8 (24.3)	72.0 (22.2)	61.6 (16.4)	51.7 (10.9)	45.7 (7.6)	60.4 (15.8)
Daily mean °F (°C)	39.8 (4.3)	41.5 (5.3)	44.9 (7.2)	48.6 (9.2)	54.4 (12.4)	58.6 (14.8)	63.5 (17.5)	64.0 (17.8)	59.8 (15.4)	51.3 (10.7)	43.9 (6.6)	39.3 (4.1)	50.8 (10.4)
Mean daily minimum °F (°C)	33.0 (0.6)	32.8 (0.4)	35.3 (1.8)	38.3 (3.5)	44.0 (6.7)	48.5 (9.2)	52.2 (11.2)	52.2 (11.2)	47.6 (8.7)	41.1 (5.1)	36.1 (2.3)	32.8 (0.4)	41.2 (5.1)
Record low °F (°C)	4 (−16)	1 (−17)	18 (−8)	25 (−4)	28 (−2)	35 (2)	35 (2)	40 (4)	30 (−1)	17 (−8)	8 (−13)	1 (−17)	1 (−17)
Average precipitation inches (mm)	8.31 (211)	5.72 (145)	6.09 (155)	4.28 (109)	2.68 (68)	1.73 (44)	0.59 (15)	0.67 (17)	2.06 (52)	4.54 (115)	8.61 (219)	9.38 (238)	54.66 (1,388)
Average snowfall inches (cm)	0.5 (1.3)	0.7 (1.8)	0.2 (0.51)	0.0 (0.0)	0.0 (0.0)	0.0 (0.0)	0.0 (0.0)	0.0 (0.0)	0.0 (0.0)	0.0 (0.0)	0.1 (0.25)	0.8 (2.0)	2.3 (5.8)
Average precipitation days (≥ 0.01 in)	22.4	18.8	22.2	19.9	14.4	11.5	5.6	5.1	8.7	17.5	22.8	23.3	192.2
Average snowy days (≥ 0.1 in)	0.7	0.5	0.3	0.0	0.0	0.0	0.0	0.0	0.0	0.0	0.1	0.7	2.3
Source: NOAA

== Demographics ==
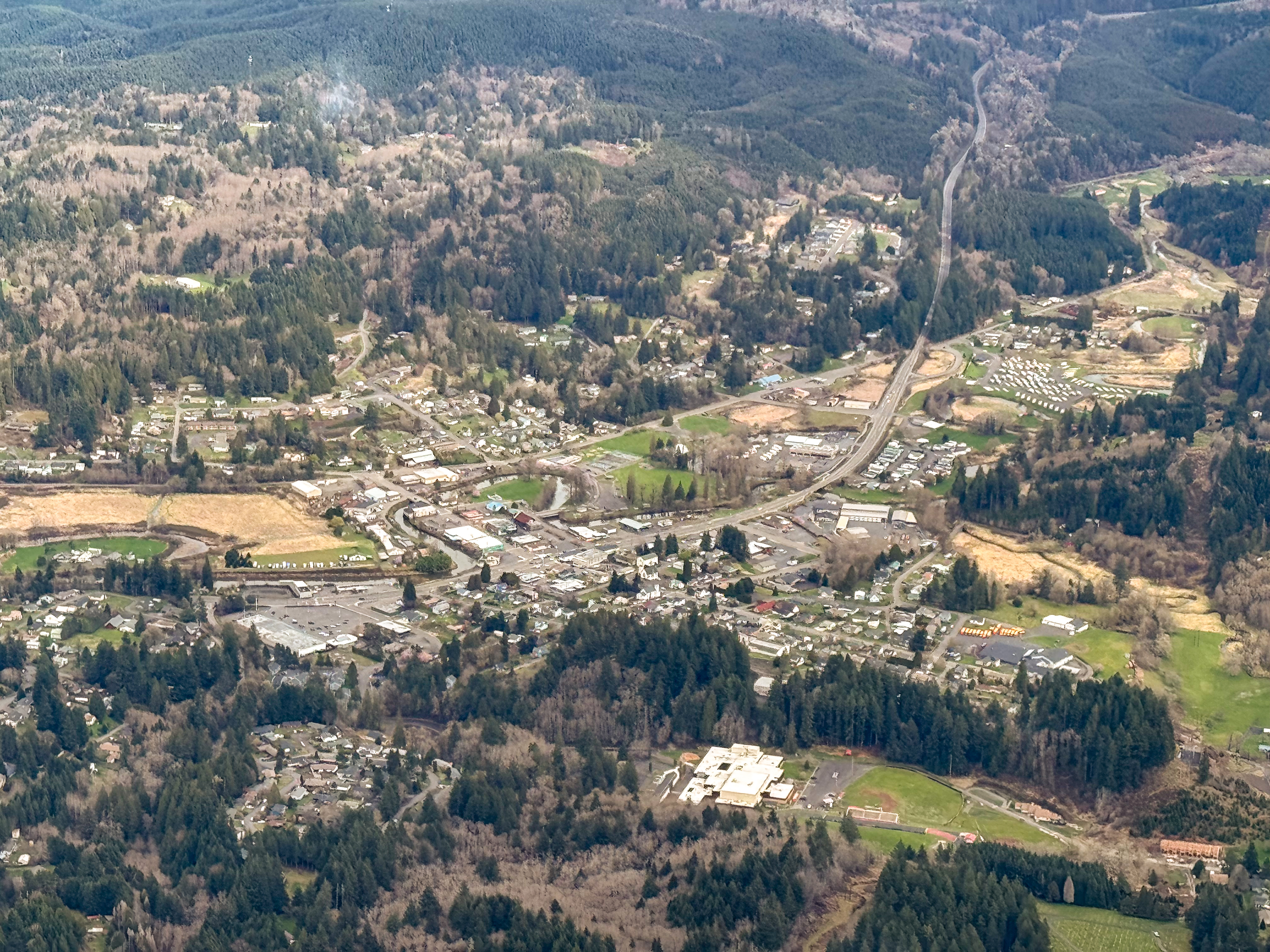
Aerial view looking east

Historical population
Census	Pop.	Note	%±
1890	212		—
1900	311		46.7%
1910	747		140.2%
1920	1,171		56.8%
1930	739		−36.9%
1940	708		−4.2%
1950	901		27.3%
1960	797		−11.5%
1970	1,286		61.4%
1980	1,648		28.1%
1990	1,629		−1.2%
2000	1,528		−6.2%
2010	1,737		13.7%
2020	1,716		−1.2%
U.S. Decennial Census

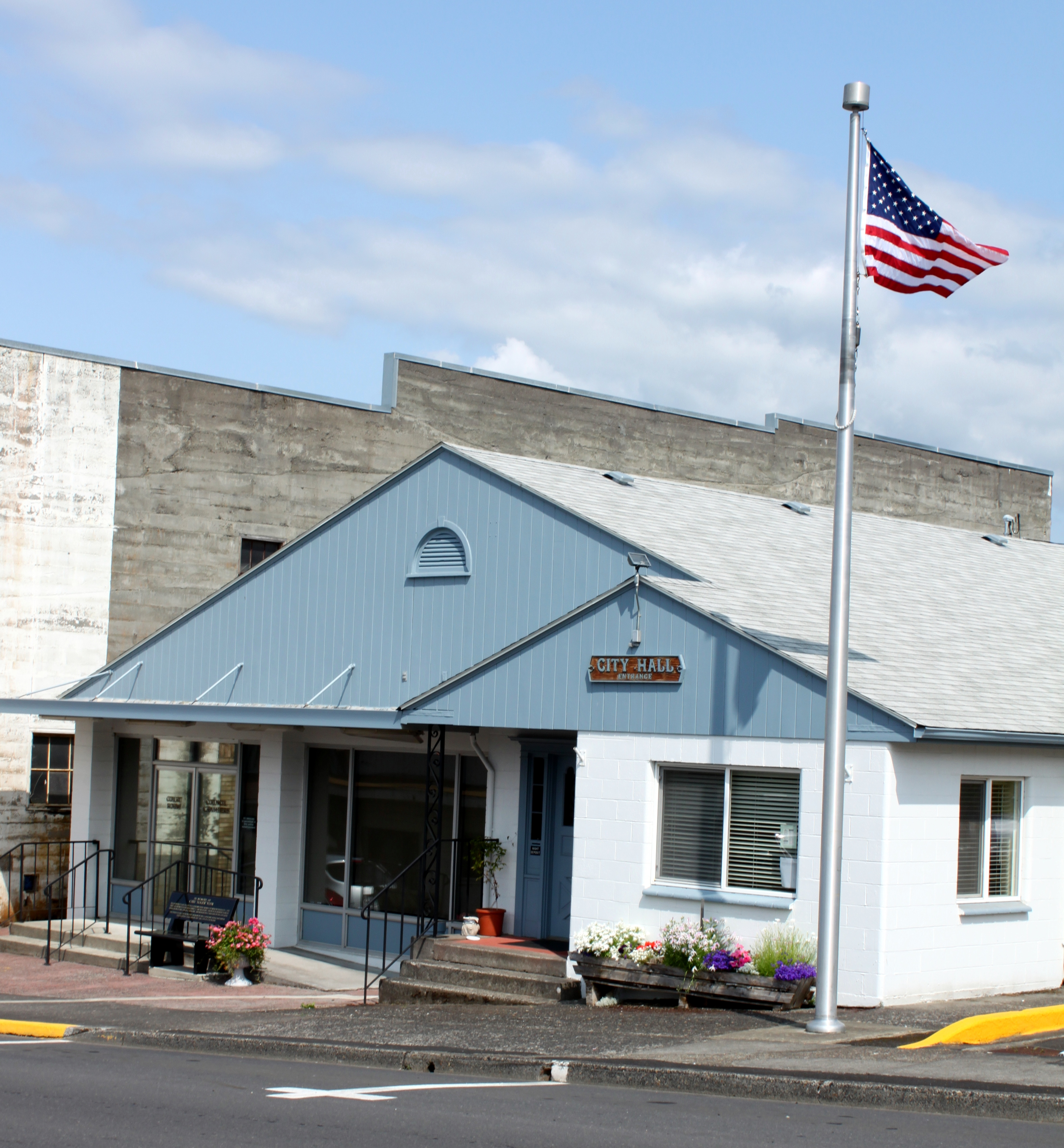
City Hall

=== 2020 census ===
As of the 2020 census, Clatskanie had a population of 1,716. The median age was 39.0 years. 21.4% of residents were under the age of 18 and 20.0% of residents were 65 years of age or older. For every 100 females there were 94.8 males, and for every 100 females age 18 and over there were 92.7 males age 18 and over.

0% of residents lived in urban areas, while 100.0% lived in rural areas.

There were 692 households in Clatskanie, of which 28.0% had children under the age of 18 living in them. Of all households, 42.8% were married-couple households, 20.5% were households with a male householder and no spouse or partner present, and 29.2% were households with a female householder and no spouse or partner present. About 30.8% of all households were made up of individuals and 16.1% had someone living alone who was 65 years of age or older.

There were 778 housing units, of which 11.1% were vacant. Among occupied housing units, 61.8% were owner-occupied and 38.2% were renter-occupied. The homeowner vacancy rate was 2.9% and the rental vacancy rate was 8.7%.

Racial composition as of the 2020 census
Race	Number	Percent
White	1,479	86.2%
Black or African American	8	0.5%
American Indian and Alaska Native	40	2.3%
Asian	4	0.2%
Native Hawaiian and Other Pacific Islander	2	0.1%
Some other race	20	1.2%
Two or more races	163	9.5%
Hispanic or Latino (of any race)	84	4.9%

=== 2010 census ===
As of the census of 2010, there were 1,737 people, 729 households, and 469 families living in the city. The population density was 1,459.7 inhabitants per square mile (563.6/km^{2}). There were 806 housing units at an average density of 677.3 per square mile (261.5/km^{2}). The racial makeup of the city was 92.9% White, 0.4% African American, 2.0% Native American, 0.5% Asian, 0.1% Pacific Islander, 0.9% from other races, and 3.3% from two or more races. Hispanic or Latino of any race were 3.7% of the population.

There were 729 households, of which 32.4% had children under the age of 18 living with them, 46.8% were married couples living together, 12.1% had a female householder with no husband present, 5.5% had a male householder with no wife present, and 35.7% were non-families. 30.9% of all households were made up of individuals, and 16.3% had someone living alone who was 65 years of age or older. The average household size was 2.36 and the average family size was 2.91.

The median age in the city was 38.9 years. 24.8% of residents were under the age of 18; 8.6% were between the ages of 18 and 24; 22.6% were from 25 to 44; 27.8% were from 45 to 64; and 16.1% were 65 years of age or older. The gender makeup of the city was 47.8% male and 52.2% female.

=== 2000 census ===
As of the census of 2000, there were 1,528 people, 608 households, and 406 families living in the city. The population density was 1,274.1 inhabitants per square mile (491.9/km^{2}). There were 659 housing units at an average density of 549.5 per square mile (212.2/km^{2}). The racial makeup of the city was 93.91% White, 0.07% African American, 1.24% Native American, 0.65% Asian, 0.26% Pacific Islander, 1.05% from other races, and 2.81% from two or more races. Hispanic or Latino of any race were 3.34% of the population. 22.6% were of German, 10.3% Norwegian, 9.4% Finnish, 9.1% Irish, 8.2% English and 6.8% American ancestry according to Census 2000. 94.0% spoke English, 4.1% Spanish and 1.6% Finnish as their first language.

There were 608 households, out of which 35.0% had children under the age of 18 living with them, 51.6% were married couples living together, 12.7% had a female householder with no husband present, and 33.1% were non-families. 27.8% of all households were made up of individuals, and 15.3% had someone living alone who was 65 years of age or older. The average household size was 2.47 and the average family size was 3.07.

In the city, the population was spread out, with 29.6% under the age of 18, 7.3% from 18 to 24, 26.0% from 25 to 44, 21.0% from 45 to 64, and 16.0% who were 65 years of age or older. The median age was 36 years. For every 100 females, there were 90.5 males. For every 100 females age 18 and over, there were 81.3 males.

The median income for a household in the city was $35,833, and the median income for a family was $48,056. Males had a median income of $41,550 versus $24,286 for females. The per capita income for the city was $16,717. About 11.1% of families and 11.5% of the population were below the poverty line, including 11.4% of those under age 18 and 12.1% of those age 65 or over.

== Education ==
Clatskanie is served by the two public schools of Clatskanie School District, namely the combined Clatskanie Middle/High School, and Clatskanie Elementary School, as well as Piercing Arrow Private School.

== Politics ==
Presidential election results
Year	DEM	GOP	Others
2020	39.5% 367	57.2% 531	3.3% 31
2016	34.3% 265	52.8% 408	12.9% 100
2012	46.3% 348	50.0% 376	3.7% 28
2008	51.3% 382	45.1% 336	3.6% 27
2004	48.4% 382	50.5% 399	1.1% 9

Clatskanie has generally voted Republican in recent years in presidential elections, with the notable exception being Barack Obama in 2008.

== Notable people ==
- Raymond Carver (1938–1988), short story writer and poet
- Cole Escola (1986–), comedian and actor
- Harvey Karman (1924–2008), psychologist and abortion rights activist
- Merlin F. Schneider (1901–1970), Brigadier General, USMC, recipient of the Navy Cross.

== See also ==
- Thomas J. Flippin House
- The Chief (Oregon newspaper), a paper long based in Clatskanie, founded in 1891
